= Use with Headphones Late at Night (Best of 1990–2000) =

Use With Headphones Late At Night (Best of 1990–2000)

Compilation album by Tadpoles
- Released: 2001
- Recorded: 1993–1999
- Genre: Psychedelic rock
- Length: 1:18:23
- Label: Bakery Records
- Producer: Tadpoles

Tadpoles chronology
Whirlaway (1999)	Use With Headphones Late At Night (Best of 1990–2000) (2001)

Professional ratings
Review scores
Source	Rating
Allmusic	3.0/5 stars
Pitchfork Media	7.5/10 stars

Use With Headphones Late At Night (Best of 1990–2000) (2001) is the first career spanning compilation CD by Tadpoles. The record features tracks from each studio album, plus four previously rare or unreleased tracks. Tracks 1–8 feature remastered works from He Fell Into The Sky and Far Out. Tracks 9–12 are identical to the versions on Smoke Ghost and Track 13 is taken directly from the Know Your Ghosts E.P. The final four songs are previously unreleased alternate mixes of Whirlaway tracks. "Crash Of The Bug (Super Beetle Radio Mix)" and "Whirlaway (Mp3 Single Mix)" were edited and mixed by Gene Holder (the dB's).

== Track listing ==
1. "Snapper" (Parker) – 3:41
2. "Umbrella Smile" (Parker) – 3:18
3. "Blossom" (Parker) – 2:53
4. "The Ride" (Parker) – 4:20
5. "Race You To The Mustard Patch" (Parker/Max)) – 4:41
6. "Nazareth (Parker)" – 5:35
7. "Ride The World Around The Sun" (Parker) – 3:20
8. "At Least I'm Not Like Jonathan Carver" (Max/Kramer/Parker) – 5:46
9. "Know Your Ghosts" (Kramer/Max) – 4:21
10. "Jaded Jean" (Parker/Max) – 3:49
11. "Rainbowmaker" (Kramer) – 5:46
12. "Firecracker" (Kramer) – 4:44
13. "Judas, This Is Jesus" (Parker) – 3:03
14. "Crash Of The Bug (Super Beetle Radio Mix)" (Parker/Max) – 4:15
15. "Whirlaway (MP3 Single Mix)" (Kramer/Parker/Max)) – 4:28
16. "Sunrise Ocean Bender (Ampreon Mix) (Parker)" – 6:52
17. "Smile If You've Crossed Over (Orgmonica Mix)" (Max/Boyette) – 7:31

== Personnel ==
- Todd Parker – vocals on 1–5, 7, 8, 10, 14, 16 and guitars, keyboards
- Nick Kramer – vocals on 6, 9, 11, 12, 15 and guitars
- David Max – bass and additional guitar on 14, effects on 17
- Adam Boyette – drums and percussion on 9–17, effects on 17

With

- Michael Kite Audino – drums and percussion on 1, 2, 3, 4
- Edward Odowd – drums and percussion on 5
- Steve Savoca – drums and percussion on 6, 7, 8
- Andrew Jackson Shapiro – guitar on 1–4
- Jeff Passifiume – lap steel guitar on 6, 8 and additional guitar on 7
- John Ian Davis – vocal sample on 13

=== Production ===
Use with Headphones Late at Night (Best of 1990–2000) was compiled and mastered by Todd Parker at DBS Digital in Hoboken, New Jersey. Additional mastering was provided by Pablo Martin. Album artwork and design were created by Ann Manca.
