= List of cult films: T =

This is a list of cult films organized alphabetically by name. See List of cult films for main list.

Film	Year	Director	Source
The Tailor of Panama	2001	John Boorman	
The Taking of Pelham One Two Three	1974	Joseph Sargent	
The Taking of Power by Louis XIV	1966	Roberto Rossellini	
The Tale of the White Serpent (also known as Panda and the Magic Serpent and The Great White Snake)	1958	Taiji Yabushita	
Tales from the Crypt	1972	Freddie Francis	
Tales of Ordinary Madness	1981	Marco Ferreri	
Talk Radio	1988	Oliver Stone	
The Tall T	1957	Budd Boetticher	
Tampopo	1985	Juzo Itami	
Tank Girl	1995	Rachel Talalay	
Tarantula	1955	Jack Arnold	
Targets	1968	Peter Bogdanovich	
The Tarnished Angels	1957	Douglas Sirk	
Tarzan and His Mate	1934	Cedric Gibbons	
Tarzan the Ape Man	1932	W. S. Van Dyke	
Tarzan's New York Adventure	1942	Richard Thorpe	
The Tattooed Hitman	1974	Kōsaku Yamashita	
Taxi	1998	Gérard Pirès	
Taxi Driver	1976	Martin Scorsese	
Taza, Son of Cochise	1954	Douglas Sirk	
Team America: World Police	2004	Trey Parker	
Teaserama	1955	Irving Klaw	
Teenagers from Outer Space	1959	Tom Graeff	
Teen Wolf	1985	Rod Daniel	
Teeth	2007	Mitchell Lichtenstein	
Tell No One	2007	Guillaume Canet	
Tell Your Children (also known as Reefer Madness)	1936	Louis J. Gasnier	
Ten	2002	Abbas Kiarostami	
The Ten Commandments	1956	Cecil B. DeMille	
The Tenderness of Wolves	1973	Ulli Lommel	
Tenebrae	1982	Dario Argento	
Tentacles	1977	Ovidio G. Assonitis	
Terminal Island	1973	Stephanie Rothman	
The Terminator	1984	James Cameron	
Terminator 2: Judgment Day	1991	James Cameron	
The Terror	1963	Roger Corman	
The Terror of Tiny Town	1938	Sam Newfield	
Terror Circus (also known as The Barn of the Naked Dead and Nightmare Circus)	1973	Alan Rudolph	
The Terrornauts	1967	Montgomery Tully	
Tetsu no tsume (also known as Claws of Iron and Claws of Steel)	1951	Nobuo Adachi	
Tetsuo: The Iron Man	1989	Shinya Tsukamoto	
Tetsuro Tamba’s Great Spirit World	1989	Teru Ishida	
The Texas Chain Saw Massacre	1974	Tobe Hooper	
Thank God It's Friday	1978	Robert Klane	
Thank You for Smoking	2005	Jason Reitman	
Thank You, Life (also known as Merci la vie)	1991	Bertrand Blier	
That Sinking Feeling	1979	Bill Forsyth	
Theatre of Blood	1973	Douglas Hickox	
Thelma & Louise	1991	Ridley Scott	
Them!	1954	Gordon Douglas	
There Will Be Blood	2007	Paul Thomas Anderson	
There's Something About Mary	1998	Peter Farrelly and Bobby Farrelly	
Thesis (also known as Tesis)	1996	Alejandro Amenábar	
They Live	1988	John Carpenter	
They Might Be Giants	1971	Anthony Harvey	
The Thief of Bagdad	1924	Raoul Walsh	
The Thief of Bagdad	1940	Michael Powell, Ludwig Berger, and Tim Whelan	
The Thin Blue Line	1988	Errol Morris	
The Thin Man	1934	W. S. Van Dyke	
The Thing	1982	John Carpenter	
The Thing from Another World	1951	Christian Nyby	
The Thing With Two Heads	1972	Lee Frost	
The Third Man	1949	Carol Reed	
Thirteen	2003	Catherine Hardwicke	
This Filthy Earth	2001	Andrew Kötting	
This Filthy World	2006	Jeff Garlin	
This Is Spinal Tap	1984	Rob Reiner	
This Island Earth	1955	Joseph M. Newman	
This Sporting Life	1963	Lindsay Anderson	
The Thomas Crown Affair	1968	Norman Jewison	
Thomasine & Bushrod	1974	Gordon Parks Jr.	
The Three Burials of Melquiades Estrada	2005	Tommy Lee Jones	
Three Colours: Blue	1993	Krzysztof Kieślowski	
Three Colours: Red	1994	Krzysztof Kieślowski	
Three Colours: White	1994	Krzysztof Kieślowski	
Three Days of the Condor	1975	Sydney Pollack	
Three... Extremes	2004	Fruit Chan, Park Chan-wook, Takashi Miike	
Thriller – A Cruel Picture	1973	Bo Arne Vibenius under the pseudonym Alex Fridolinski	
Through a Glass Darkly	1961	Ingmar Bergman	
Thundercrack!	1975	Curt McDowell	
THX 1138	1971	George Lucas	
Tie Me Up! Tie Me Down! (also known as ¡Átame!)	1989	Pedro Almodóvar	
Time Bandits	1981	Terry Gilliam	
The Time to Live and the Time to Die	1985	Hou Hsiao-hsien	
A Time to Love and a Time to Die	1958	Douglas Sirk	
The Time Travelers	1964	Ib Melchior	
Tin Men	1987	Barry Levinson	
The Tingler	1959	William Castle	
Titanic	1997	James Cameron	
TNT Jackson	1974	Cirio Santiago	
To Be and to Have	2002	Nicolas Philibert	
To Be or Not to Be	1942	Ernst Lubitsch	
To Die For	1995	Gus Van Sant	
To Kill a Mockingbird	1962	Robert Mulligan	
To Sleep with Anger	1990	Charles Burnett	
Together	2000	Lukas Moodysson	
Tokyo Decadence	1992	Ryū Murakami	
Tokyo Drifter	1966	Seijun Suzuki	
Tokyo Story	1953	Yasujirō Ozu	
Tokyo: The Last Megalopolis	1988	Akio Jissoji	
Tom Brown's Schooldays	1951	Gordon Parry	
Tombs of the Blind Dead	1972	Amando de Ossorio	
Tommy	1975	Ken Russell	
Tongues Untied	1989	Marlon T. Riggs	
Tony Rome	1967	Gordon Douglas	
Too Late the Hero	1970	Robert Aldrich	
The Toolbox Murders	1978	Dennis Donnelly	
Top Gun	1986	Tony Scott	
Top Hat	1935	Mark Sandrich	
Top Secret!	1984	Jim Abrahams, David Zucker and Jerry Zucker	
Topkapi	1964	Jules Dassin	
El Topo	1970	Alejandro Jodorowsky	
Topsy-Turvy	1999	Mike Leigh	
Torch Song Trilogy	1988	Paul Bogart	
Torremolinos 73	2003	Pablo Berger	
Torrente, the Dumb Arm of the Law	1998	Santiago Segura	
Torso	1973	Sergio Martino	
Torture Dungeon	1969	Andy Milligan	
Torture Garden	1967	Freddie Francis	
Totally F***ed Up (also known as Totally Fucked Up)	1993	Gregg Araki	
Touch of Evil	1958	Orson Welles	
A Touch of Zen	1971	King Hu	
Touchez pas au grisbi (also known as Grisbi and Honour Among Thieves)	1954	Jacques Becker	
Touching the Void	2003	Kevin Macdonald	
The Tough Ones (also known as Rome, Armed to the Teeth)	1976	Umberto Lenzi	
Tout va bien	1972	Jean-Luc Godard and Jean-Pierre Gorin	
The Towering Inferno	1974	John Guillermin	
The Toxic Avenger	1984	Michael Herz, Lloyd Kaufman	
Toy Story	1995	John Lasseter	
Tracks	1976	Henry Jaglom	
Traffic	2000	Steven Soderbergh	
The Train	1964	John Frankenheimer	
Trainspotting	1996	Danny Boyle	
The Transformers: The Movie	1986	Nelson Shin	
The Transgressor (also known as Convent of the Sacred Beast and School of the Holy Beast)	1974	Norifumi Suzuki	
Transylvania 6-5000	1985	Rudy De Luca	
Trap Them and Kill Them (also known as Emanuelle and the Last Cannibals)	1977	Joe D'Amato	
Trash	1970	Paul Morrissey	
The Treasure of the Sierra Madre	1948	John Huston	
Trees Lounge	1996	Steve Buscemi	
Tremors	1990	Ron Underwood	
The Trial	1962	Orson Welles	
Trick 'r Treat	2007	Michael Dougherty	
The Trip	1967	Roger Corman	
A Trip to the Moon	1902	Georges Méliès	
The Triplets of Belleville	2003	Sylvain Chomet	
Triumph of the Will	1935	Leni Riefenstahl	
Trog	1970	Freddie Francis	
Troll 2	1990	Claudio Fragasso	
Tron	1982	Steven Lisberger	
Troops	1997	Kevin Rubio	
Tropic Thunder	2008	Ben Stiller	
Trouble Every Day	2001	Claire Denis	
Trouble Man	1972	Ivan Dixon	
True Romance	1993	Tony Scott	
True Stories	1986	David Byrne	
The Truman Show	1998	Peter Weir	
Tucker: The Man and His Dream	1988	Francis Ford Coppola	
Turkey Shoot (also known as Escape 2000 and Blood Camp Thatcher)	1982	Brian Trenchard-Smith	
Turkish Delight	1973	Paul Verhoeven	
Tusk	1980	Alejandro Jodorowsky	
The Twelve Chairs	1970	Mel Brooks	
Twelve Monkeys (also known as 12 Monkeys)	1995	Terry Gilliam	
Twilight	2008	Catherine Hardwicke	
Twilight of the Ice Nymphs	1997	Guy Maddin	
Twilight's Last Gleaming	1977	Robert Aldrich	
Twin Peaks: Fire Walk with Me	1992	David Lynch	
Two for the Road	1967	Stanley Donen	
Two Mules for Sister Sara	1970	Don Siegel	
Two Thousand Maniacs! (also known as 2000 Maniacs)	1964	Herschell Gordon Lewis	
Two-Lane Blacktop	1971	Monte Hellman	
The Typewriter, the Rifle and the Movie Camera	1996	Adam Simon	
