= List of cult films: S =

This is a list of cult films organized alphabetically by name. See List of cult films for main list.

Film	Year	Director	Source
The Sadistic Hypnotist (also known as Wanda, the Sadistic Hypnotist)	1969	Greg Corarito	
Salò, or the 120 Days of Sodom	1975	Pier Paolo Pasolini	
Salon Kitty	1976	Tinto Brass	
Salt of the Earth	1954	Herbert J. Biberman	
Salvador	1986	Oliver Stone	
Salvatore Giuliano	1962	Francesco Rosi	
Le Samouraï	1967	Jean-Pierre Melville	
San Francisco	1936	W. S. Van Dyke	
O Sangue (also known as Blood)	1989	Pedro Costa	
Sans Soleil	1983	Chris Marker	
Santa Claus Conquers the Martians	1964	Nicholas Webster	
Santa Fe Satan (also known as Catch My Soul)	1974	Patrick McGoohan	
Santa Sangre	1989	Alejandro Jodorowsky	
Santo vs. las Mujeres Vampiro	1962	Alfonso Corona Blake	
The Saragossa Manuscript	1965	Wojciech Jerzy Has	
Satan's Cheerleaders	1977	Greydon Clark	
Satan's Sabbath (also known as Le diable est parmi nous and The Possession of Virginia)	1972	Jean Beaudin	
The Satanic Rites of Dracula	1973	Alan Gibson	
Satanis: The Devil's Mass	1970	Ray Laurent	
Saturday Night Fever	1977	John Badham	
Satya	1998	Ram Gopal Varma	
Savage Beast Goes Mad (also known as Crazed Beast and Kurutta yaju)	1976	Sadao Nakajima	
Savage Grace	2007	Tom Kalin	
Savage Nights (also known as Les Nuits Fauves)	1992	Cyril Collard	
Saw	2004	James Wan	
A Scanner Darkly	2006	Richard Linklater	
Scanners	1981	David Cronenberg	
Scarecrow	1973	Jerry Schatzberg	
Scarface	1932	Howard Hawks	
Scarface	1983	Brian De Palma	
The Scarlet Empress	1934	Josef von Sternberg	
Schindler's List	1993	Steven Spielberg	
Schizopolis	1996	Steven Soderbergh	
Schlock	1973	John Landis	
School of the Holy Beast (also known as Convent of the SacredBeast and The Transgressor)	1974	Norifumi Suzuki	
Schramm	1993	Jörg Buttgereit	
Schulmädchen-Report (also known as Schoolgirl Report)	1970	Ernst Hofbauer	
Scorned	1993	Andrew Stevens	
Scorpio Rising	1964	Kenneth Anger	
Scott Pilgrim vs. the World	2010	Edgar Wright	
Scott Walker: 30 Century Man	2006	Stephen Kijak	
Scream	1996	Wes Craven	
Scream and Scream Again	1970	Gordon Hessler	
Scream Blacula Scream	1973	Bob Kelljan	
Screamers	1995	Christian Duguay	
Scum	1979	Alan Clarke	
SCUM Manifesto	1976	Carole Roussopoulos and Delphine Seyrig	
The Sea Hawk	1940	Michael Curtiz	
Séance on a Wet Afternoon	1964	Bryan Forbes	
The Searchers	1956	John Ford	
Searching for Bobby Fischer	1993	Steven Zaillian	
Sebastiane	1976	Derek Jarman and Paul Humfress	
Second Fiddle	1939	Sidney Lanfield	
Seconds	1966	John Frankenheimer	
Secret Ceremony	1968	Joseph Losey	
The Secret Garden	1993	Agnieszka Holland	
The Secret of Roan Inish	1994	John Sayles	
Seducing Doctor Lewis	2003	Jean-François Pouliot	
See Spot Run	2001	John Whitesell	
Sekal Has to Die	1998	Vladimír Michálek	
Seizure	1974	Oliver Stone	
The Sensuous Three (also known as Harlis)	1972	Robert van Ackeren	
Séraphine	2008	Martin Provost	
A Serbian Film	2010	Srđan Spasojević	
Serial Mom	1994	John Waters	
The Serpent and the Rainbow	1988	Wes Craven	
Serpico	1973	Sidney Lumet	
The Servant	1963	Joseph Losey	
The Set-Up	1949	Robert Wise	
Seven (also stylized as Se7en)	1995	David Fincher	
Seven Samurai	1954	Akira Kurosawa	
Seventh Heaven	1997	Benoît Jacquot	
The Seventh Seal	1957	Ingmar Bergman	
Sex and Zen	1991	Michael Mak	
Sex and Zen III	1998	Aman Chang	
Sex: The Annabel Chong Story	1999	Gough Lewis	
Sex, Lies, and Videotape	1989	Steven Soderbergh	
The Sexorcist (also known as The Eerie Midnight Horror Show and Enter the Devil)	1974	Mario Gariazzo	
Sexy Beast	2000	Jonathan Glazer	
Sgt. Pepper's Lonely Hearts Club Band	1978	Michael Schultz	
Shack Out on 101	1955	Edward Dein	
Shadow of a Doubt	1943	Alfred Hitchcock	
Shadow of the Vampire	2000	E. Elias Merhige	
Shadows	1959	John Cassavetes	
Shadows of Forgotten Ancestors	1965	Sergei Parajanov	
Shaft	1971	Gordon Parks	
Shaft in Africa	1973	John Guillermin	
Shahenshah	1988	Tinnu Anand	
Shake, Rattle & Rock!	1956	Edward L. Cahn	
Shakes the Clown	1991	Bobcat Goldthwait	
Shakespeare in Love	1998	John Madden	
Shallow Grave	1994	Danny Boyle	
Shane	1953	George Stevens	
Shanghai Noon	2000	Tom Dey	
Shanks	1974	William Castle	
Shaun of the Dead	2004	Edgar Wright	
The Shawshank Redemption	1994	Frank Darabont	
She Killed in Ecstasy	1971	Jesús Franco	
Sherlock Jr.	1924	Buster Keaton	
The Shining	1980	Stanley Kubrick	
Shivers	1975	David Cronenberg	
Shoah	1985	Claude Lanzmann	
Shock	1946	Alfred L. Werker	
Shock Corridor	1963	Samuel Fuller	
Shock Waves	1977	Ken Wiederhorn	
Shogun Assassin	1980	Robert Houston	
Sholay	1975	Ramesh Sippy	
Shoot the Piano Player	1960	François Truffaut	
Shoot to Kill	1990	Peter Kosminsky	
The Shooting	1966	Monte Hellman	
The Shop on Main Street	1965	Ján Kadár and Elmar Klos	
A Short Film About Killing	1988	Krzysztof Kieślowski	
Shortbus	2006	John Cameron Mitchell	
A Shot in the Dark	1964	Blake Edwards	
Show Me Love	1998	Lukas Moodysson	
Showgirls	1995	Paul Verhoeven	
The Sicilian Clan	1969	Henri Verneuil	
Sick: The Life and Death of Bob Flanagan, Supermasochist	1997	Kirby Dick	
Sid & Nancy	1986	Alex Cox	
The Sign of the Cross	1932	Cecil B. DeMille	
The Silence of the Lambs	1991	Jonathan Demme	
Silent Movie	1976	Mel Brooks	
The Silent Partner	1978	Daryl Duke	
Silent Running	1972	Douglas Trumbull	
The Silent Star (also known as First Spaceship on Venus)	1960	Kurt Maetzig	
The Silent Village	1943	Humphrey Jennings	
The Silver Chalice	1954	Victor Saville	
Silsila	1981	Yash Chopra	
Sin City	2005	Frank Miller, Robert Rodriguez, and Quentin Tarantino	
Sin nombre	2009	Cary Joji Fukunaga	
Singin' in the Rain	1952	Gene Kelly and Stanley Donen	
The Sinners of Hell (also known as Jigoku)	1960	Nobuo Nakagawa	
Sins of the Fleshapoids	1965	Mike Kuchar	
Sissi	1955	Ernst Marischka	
Sissi – Fateful Years of an Empress	1957	Ernst Marischka	
Sissi – The Young Empress	1956	Ernst Marischka	
Sisters	1972	Brian De Palma	
Sisters in Law	2005	Florence Ayisi and Kim Longinotto	
Skidoo	1968	Otto Preminger	
Skinamarink	2022	Kyle Edward Ball	
Slacker	1990	Richard Linklater	
Slap Shot	1977	George Roy Hill	
Sleep	1964	Andy Warhol	
Sleep Furiously	2008	Gideon Koppel	
Sleep with Me	1994	Rory Kelly	
Sleepaway Camp	1983	Robert Hiltzik	
Sleeper	1973	Woody Allen	
Sleepy Hollow	1999	Tim Burton	
Slithis (also known as Spawn of the Slithis)	1978	Stephen Traxler	
Smithereens	1982	Susan Seidelman	
Smokey and the Bandit	1977	Hal Needham	
Snakes on a Plane	2006	David R. Ellis	
Snakes on a Train	2006	Peter Mervis	
Sneakers	1992	Phil Alden Robinson	
Snow White and the Seven Dwarfs	1937	Multiple	
Snuff	1976	Michael Findlay and Horacio Fredriksson	
So Close	2002	Corey Yuen	
Society	1989	Brian Yuzna	
Solaris	1972	Andrei Tarkovsky	
Soldier Blue	1970	Ralph Nelson	
Solomon and Sheba	1959	King Vidor	
Some Like It Hot	1959	Billy Wilder	
Something Wicked This Way Comes	1983	Jack Clayton	
Something Wild	1986	Jonathan Demme	
Sometimes Aunt Martha Does Dreadful Things	1971	Thomas Casey	
Son of Paleface	1952	Frank Tashlin	
Sonatine	1993	Takeshi Kitano	
The Song Remains the Same (also known as Led Zeppelin: The Song Remains the Same)	1976	Peter Clifton and Joe Massot	
Sons of the Desert	1933	William A. Seiter	
Sorcerer	1977	William Friedkin	
La Sorcière (also known as The Sorceress)	1956	André Michel	
Soul Vengeance (also known as Welcome Home Brother Charles)	1975	Jamaa Fanaka	
La Soufrière	1977	Werner Herzog	
The Sound of Music	1965	Robert Wise	
The Sound of One Hand Clapping	1998	Richard Flanagan	
South Park: Bigger, Longer & Uncut	1999	Trey Parker	
Southern Comfort	1981	Walter Hill	
Soylent Green	1973	Richard Fleischer	
Space Amoeba (also known as Yog: Monster from Space)	1970	Ishirō Honda	
Space Is the Place	1974	John Coney	
Space Sweepers	2021	Jo Sung-hee	
Spaceballs	1987	Mel Brooks	
Spanking the Monkey	1994	David O. Russell	
Spartacus	1960	Stanley Kubrick	
Spawn of the Slithis (also known as Slithis)	1978	Stephen Traxler	
Speed	1994	Jan de Bont	
Speed Racer	2008	The Wachowskis	
Spellbound	1945	Alfred Hitchcock	
Spellbound	2002	Jeffrey Blitz	
Spider	2002	David Cronenberg	
Spider Baby	1967	Jack Hill	
The Spider's Stratagem	1970	Bernardo Bertolucci	
SpiderBabe	2003	Johnny Crash	
Spies (Spione)	1928	Fritz Lang	
Spirit of the Dead (also known as The Asphyx and The Horror of Death)	1972	Peter Newbrook	
Spirited Away	2001	Hayao Miyazaki	
Spirits of the Dead	1968	Roger Vadim, Louis Malle, Federico Fellini	
Splendor in the Grass	1961	Elia Kazan	
Splice	2009	Vincenzo Natali	
Spring, Summer, Fall, Winter... and Spring	2003	Kim Ki-duk	
The Spy Who Came In from the Cold	1965	Martin Ritt	
The Squeeze	1977	Michael Apted	
Squirm	1976	Jeff Lieberman	
Stalker	1979	Andrei Tarkovsky	
The Stand	1994	Mick Garris	
Stand by Me	1986	Rob Reiner	
A Star Is Born	1954	George Cukor	
Star Trek	2009	J. J. Abrams	
Star Trek II: The Wrath of Khan	1982	Nicholas Meyer	
Star Wars: Episode I – The Phantom Menace	1999	George Lucas	
Star Wars: Episode II – Attack of the Clones	2002	George Lucas	
Star Wars: Episode III – Revenge of the Sith	2005	George Lucas	
Star Wars Episode IV – A New Hope	1977	George Lucas	
Star Wars Episode V – The Empire Strikes Back	1980	Irvin Kershner	
Star Wars Episode VI – Return of the Jedi	1983	Richard Marquand	
Stardust	1974	Michael Apted	
Stardust Memories	1980	Woody Allen	
Starship Troopers	1997	Paul Verhoeven	
Starship Troopers 2: Hero of the Federation	2004	Phil Tippett	
Startup.com	2001	Jehane Noujaim and Chris Hegedus	
State of Grace	1990	Phil Joanou	
Staying Alive	1983	Sylvester Stallone	
Steamboy	2004	Katsuhiro Otomo	
The Steel Helmet	1951	Samuel Fuller	
The Stepford Wives	1975	Bryan Forbes	
The Stink of Flesh	2005	Scott Phillips	
Stop Making Sense	1984	Jonathan Demme	
The Story of a Cheat (also known as Confessions of a Cheat and Le Roman d'un tricheur)	1936	Sacha Guitry	
The Story of Louis Pasteur	1936	William Dieterle	
The Story of Mankind	1957	Irwin Allen	
Story of O (also known as Histoire d'O)	1975	Just Jaeckin	
La Strada	1954	Federico Fellini	
Straight and Narrow	1970	Beverly Grant and Tom Conrad	
The Straight Story	1999	David Lynch	
Straight Time	1978	Ulu Grosbard	
Strange Brew	1983	Rick Moranis and Dave Thomas	
Strange Days	1995	Kathryn Bigelow	
The Strange Love of Martha Ivers	1946	Lewis Milestone	
The Stranger	1946	Orson Welles	
Stranger Than Paradise	1984	Jim Jarmusch	
Straw Dogs	1971	Sam Peckinpah	
Stray Dog	1949	Akira Kurosawa	
The Street Fighter	1974	Shigehiro Ozawa	
Street Mobster	1972	Kinji Fukasaku	
Street of Crocodiles	1986	Brothers Quay	
Street Without a Name	1934	Pierre Chenal	
A Streetcar Named Desire	1951	Elia Kazan	
The Streetfighter (also known as Hard Times)	1975	Walter Hill	
Streets of Fire	1984	Walter Hill	
Strictly Ballroom	1992	Baz Luhrmann	
Stripes	1981	Ivan Reitman	
Stuck on You	2003	Peter Farrelly and Bobby Farrelly	
Student Bodies	1981	Mickey Rose	
Submersion of Japan	1973	Shiro Moritani	
Subway	1985	Luc Besson	
Successive Slidings of Pleasure	1974	Alain Robbe-Grillet	
Suddenly	1954	Lewis Allen	
Suddenly, Last Summer	1959	Joseph L. Mankiewicz	
Suicide Club	2001	Sion Sono	
Sullivan's Travels	1941	Preston Sturges	
The Sum of Us	1994	Geoff Burton and Kevin Dowling	
Sunrise: A Song of Two Humans	1927	F. W. Murnau	
Sunset Boulevard	1950	Billy Wilder	
Super Fly	1972	Gordon Parks, Jr.	
Super Fly T.N.T.	1973	Ron O'Neal	
Superman	1978	Richard Donner	
Superman	1987	B. Gupta	
Superman and the Mole Men	1951	Lee Sholem	
Superstar: The Karen Carpenter Story	1987	Todd Haynes	
Surakksha	1979	Raveekant Nagaich	
Suspiria	1977	Dario Argento	
Suspiria	2018	Luca Guadagnino	
Suture	1993	Scott McGehee and David Siegel	
Swamp Thing	1982	Wes Craven	
The Swarm	1978	Irwin Allen	
Sweeney 2	1978	Tom Clegg	
Sweeney!	1977	David Wickes	
Sweet Charity	1969	Bob Fosse	
The Sweet Hereafter	1997	Atom Egoyan	
Sweet Movie	1974	Dušan Makavejev	
Sweet Smell of Success	1957	Alexander Mackendrick	
Sweet Sweetback's Baadasssss Song	1971	Melvin Van Peebles	
Swept Away	2002	Guy Ritchie	
The Swimmer	1968	Frank Perry	
Switchblade Sisters	1975	Jack Hill	
Swoon	1992	Tom Kalin	
Sylvia Scarlett	1935	George Cukor	
Symbiopsychotaxiplasm	1968	William Greaves	
Sympathy for Mr. Vengeance	2002	Park Chan-wook	
Sympathy for the Underdog	1971	Kinji Fukasaku	
Synecdoche, New York	2008	Charlie Kaufman	
