= Tadpoles (band) =

American band

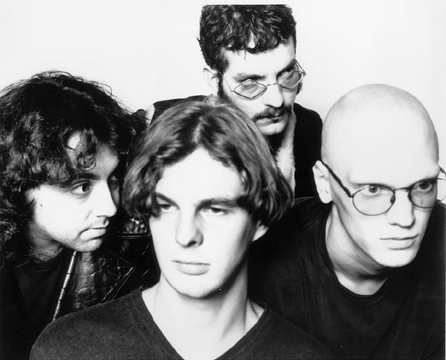
- From Left to Right: Todd Parker, Nick Kramer, David Max, Adam Boyette

Background information
- Origin: Manhattan, New York / Hoboken, New Jersey, United States
- Genres: Psychedelic rock, noise pop, indie rock, space rock
- Years active: 1990–2000, 2021-present
- Labels: Bakery Records, Camera Obscura Records, The Sound of Sinners, Tadpoles Music Records
- Members: Todd Parker; Nick Kramer; David Max
- Past members: Michael Kite Audino; Andrew Jackson; Josh Bracken; Adam Boyette
- Website: tadpolesmusic.com

Tadpoles were an American psychedelic rock band, formed in 1990 in New York City by Todd Parker (guitars/vocals), Michael Kite Audino (drums) and Josh Bracken (bass.) In 1992, Nick Kramer (guitars/vocals), David Max (bass) and Andrew Jackson (guitars) of the fledgling Manhattan group, Hit, joined the Tadpoles after putting Hit on hiatus.

In 1993 Kite and Jackson left the group, which relocated to Hoboken, New Jersey, where Parker formed Bakery Records. In 1996, Adam Boyette (drums) joined Tadpoles to complete what would be their final line-up. Parker announced the Tadpoles would be going on an “indefinite hiatus” in 2000, and the group disbanded. Kramer, Max and Boyette reformed Hit and continued on.

== History ==
Todd Parker originally formed the group while living in Champaign, Illinois in 1985 as an outlet for mostly solo 4-track recordings. These recordings were released on the cassettes, Ham & Eggs (1987); Limousines, Sardines, Dinosaurs (1988); Beautiful Music For Ugly Children (1989); and William’s Doll (1990). New York University (NYU) filmmaker, Michael Kite Audino became increasingly more involved in the recordings, so Parker and Kite decided to form a live version of the Tadpoles in New York City in 1990. They released one more cassette album Ride The Soul (1991) which featured their initial NYC recordings.

While Parker's previous recordings were all over the musical map, the new group focused on their psychedelic rock influences, combining Kite's films, a homemade light show, and an excessively loud sound volume to create a multi-sensory live experience akin to what the Butthole Surfers, My Bloody Valentine, Spacemen 3, and The Flaming Lips were doing at the time. Tadpoles became fixtures on the Manhattan rock club scene in 1992-1993 after NYU students, Nick Kramer, David Max and Andrew Jackson, joined the group.

In 1992, the band recorded a 10-song demo tape, Superwhip, and began a relationship with producer/Shimmy Disc Records owner, Mark Kramer, who offered to record the group at his Noise New Jersey Studio, where in 1993, Tadpoles recorded their debut album, He Fell Into The Sky. However, internal issues led to the departure of both Kite and Jackson before the album was released, and the group stalled temporarily.

In 1994, Parker formed Bakery Records to release He Fell Into The Sky, an album of short, powerful, psychedelic pop-rock songs; and, it received very positive reviews... although, the band still had a difficult time finding their audience in the Manhattan clubs. Tadpoles continued to record new material with Kramer at Noise New Jersey with guest drummers, Steve Savoca (The Werefrogs) and Edward Odowd (The Toilet Boys / Psychic TV) and with Nick Kramer taking a bigger role in song-writing and guitar-playing. Jeff Passifiume (The Lost Continentals/Hank McCoy and The Dead Ringers) added tasty, soaring lap steel to the mix. In the fall of 1994, Tadpoles were showcased in the College Music Journal (CMJ) music marathon at Manhattan's Batcave club.

In 1996, Tadpoles’ second album, Far Out, again produced by Shimmy Disc's Kramer, was released on Bakery Records and was extremely well received, both nationally and internationally, by the alternative music press. Far Out also garnered an unexpected and uncommon (for a self-released band) 4-star review from Rolling Stone magazine by writer Jim DeRogatis. With a smoother, spacier sound, Far Out gained Tadpoles a national fan base due to enthusiastic airplay on college radio. This led to the group being picked up by larger distributors so that their albums were able to reach a wider audience. The group, which rarely played live, added Adam Boyette as their permanent drummer and began writing and recording their next album.

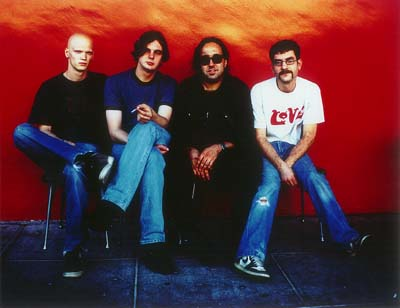
The Tadpoles in 1997

In 1997, Tadpoles performed a well-received set at the first Terrastock Festival held in Providence, Rhode Island. The performance gained them new fans and was released in 1998 as Destroy Terrastock – Live, with both the album cover and title being derived from a Kiss (band) Bootleg “Destroys Anaheim.” In the fall of 1997, Tadpoles toured the US west coast along with fellow Terrastock veterans, Cul de Sac (group) and Windy & Carl, and played a show in Portland, Oregon with the legendary John Fahey.

Coinciding with the tour, Tadpoles released an EP, Know Your Ghosts, which contained a track from the upcoming new studio album, along with a few other unreleased songs, one of which was a cover of the Tony Mentzer track, “Oops, I Lost Your Mind.” “Oops, I Lost Your Mind” featured Tony Mentzer on vocals, along with Chris Butler (The Waitresses/Tin Huey) on drums.

In 1998, Tadpoles released their third Bakery Records studio album, Smoke Ghost, which was once again produced by Kramer (Shimmy Disc/Bongwater) at Noise New Jersey. The album, richly layered, thick, lush psychedelia, was again well received by press; but, by this point, Tadpoles had essentially eschewed live performance, with little intention of venturing outside their Hoboken rehearsal studio except for a rare local club appearance. Smoke Ghost featured a significant song-writing contribution from Nick Kramer, who wrote half the material.

Tadpoles recorded their final studio album, Whirlaway, (producing themselves this time,) at Ampreon Recorder in Youngstown, Ohio. Engineer Pete Drivere captured the live feel of the expansive set of songs; and, the result was the first Tadpoles album released on a label other than Bakery Records. Australia's Camera Obscura Records released Whirlaway in 1999, again garnering rave reviews and new fans for the group. Whirlaway's long instrumental closing track, "Horse and Buggy", was recorded at Manhattan's Knitting Factory by their long-time producer, Kramer; and, Tadpoles mixed an entire version of the album with Gene Holder (The dB's), although only a few of these mixes were used. (Drivere's mix was preferred by the band.)

Sharing the bill with Thurston Moore and Half Japanese, Tadpoles gave their final performance in February 2000 at a sold-out show at Maxwell's in Hoboken, which was the first time they ever played their legendary hometown club. Later in 2000, Todd Parker announced that the group was going on an “indefinite hiatus” and they disbanded.

In 2001, Bakery Records released Use With Headphones Late At Night- Best of 1990-2000, a remastered compilation featuring tracks from each studio album, along with alternate mixes. A decade later, in 2011, Bakery released Feel Like A Freak (A Historical Sideshow of Missing Links), a second compilation album of previously unreleased studio tracks and alternate mixes.

Since the Tadpoles disbanded, David Max, Nick Kramer and Adam Boyette, reformed Hit and released the vinyl EP Quosibility and completed a currently unreleased album See It Majestic. David Max became a member of seminal psychedelic electronic noise group, Psychic TV (PTV3) along with Edward Odowd (who played drums on 2 tracks on Tadpoles’ Far Out album.) David Max performs guitar on the 2007 PTV3 album, Hell is Invisible... Heaven is Her/e and the 2008 PTV3 album, Mr. Alien Brain vs the Skinwalkers. David appears in the 2011 documentary film by Marie Losier, The Ballad of Genesis and Lady Jaye. In 2007, Nick Kramer, along with Alex Kress, released an album of duets/covers, "Nicholas & Alexandra." In 2010, David Max released a solo album, Simple Psychedelic Pleasures and Todd Parker released an album, Greetings From The Star Chamber by his solo project, Todd Parker and The Witches, reuniting him with original Tadpoles' drummer/collaborator, Michael Kite Audino. Parker released the companion EP The Star Club E.P. in December, 2010 as well as two additional EPs Ukulele Colored Glasses EP and Temple of The Goddess EP in 2011. In 2012, Todd Parker and The Witches released a newly re-recorded version of the Tadpoles' 1989 cassette-only album Beautiful Music For Ugly Children, called Evil Bliss. Parker's third solo album Martians (album) was released by Bakery Records on June 21, 2013.

Core members, Todd Parker, David Max and Nick Kramer reunited in 2021 and resumed Tadpoles. The first release by the reunited group, Make Believe EP, was released on the New York City boutique label, The Sound Of Sinners, in 2025 and was mixed by Sonic Boom. A re-imagined and remixed (by Todd Parker and Cameron Karren) version of the EP , Make Believe (Smoky Remix) was released in 2026 on Tadpoles Music Records. A new double album, Timeseeker, is scheduled for release in 2027.

== Discography ==
=== Cassette-Only Albums ===
- Ham and Eggs-A Collection (1987)
- Limousines, Sardines, Dinosaurs (1988)
- Beautiful Music For Ugly Children (1989)
- William's Doll (1990)
- Ride The Soul E.P. (1991)
- Superwhip (1992)

=== Official Studio Albums ===
- He Fell Into The Sky (Bakery 1994, and remastered version Bakery 1997)
- Far Out (Bakery 1996)
- Smoke Ghost (Bakery 1998)
- Whirlaway (Camera Obscura/Bakery 1999)

=== Live ===
- Destroy Terrastock - Live (Bakery 1998)
- Float Away - Live At CBGB’s (Bakery 2014)
- Live At The Great American Music Hall (Bakery 2017)

=== EP ===
- Know Your Ghosts E.P. (Bakery 1997)
- Make Believe E.P. (The Sound of Sinners 2025)
- Make Believe (Smoky Remix) E.P. (Tadpoles Music Records 2026)

=== Compilations ===
- Use With Headphones Late At Night (Best of 1990-2000) (Bakery 2001)
- Feel Like A Freak (A Historical Sideshow of Missing Links) (Bakery 2011)
- Nine Rays Of Moonshine (Bakery 2021)
