= Lady Jaye (disambiguation) =

Lady Jaye is a fictional character in the G.I. Joe: A Real American Hero toyline, comic books and animated series.

Lady Jaye may also refer to:

- Lady Jaye P-Orridge (born 1969), English artist, musician and nurse
- The Ballad of Genesis and Lady Jaye, 2011 documentary film
