= Miss Jackie =

Miss Jackie may refer to:

- Jackie Gayda (born 1981), American professional wrestler
- Miss Jackie of the Navy, a 1916 film starring Margarita Fischer
- Miss Jackie of the Army, a 1917 film starring Margarita Fischer
- Lady Jaye Breyer P-Orridge (1969–2007), American performance artist and musician
