= Jennifer M. Kroot =

American filmmaker

Jennifer Kroot
- Occupation: Filmmaker

Jennifer Kroot is an American filmmaker whose films include the documentaries It Came From Kuchar (2009) and To Be Takei (2014).

== Career ==
Kroot studied filmmaking at the San Francisco Art Institute, where she met George Kuchar. Kuchar's "influence helped shape her films, such as the campy sci-fi satire Sirens of the 23rd Century." Her follow up to Sirens was the film It Came From Kuchar, a documentary feature about twin underground filmmakers George and Mike Kuchar. Featuring interviews from Guy Maddin, John Waters, Atom Egoyan, Wane Wang and Buck Henry, It Came from Kuchar "crams a true cornucopia of excerpts from the prolific brothers’ output," which includes their early 8mm films from the 1950s and 1960s, as well as their 16mm classic, The Corruption of the Damned. It Came from Kuchar premiered at the 2008 South by Southwest Film Festival and was later broadcast on KQED's Truly CA.

For her next project, Kroot decided to follow celebrity and activist, George Takei. To Be Takei premiered at the 2014 Sundance Film Festival and was later sold to Starz Digital Media. The film screened at a number of other film festivals worldwide, including Hot Docs and IDFA.

Kroot's 2017 film, The Untold Tales of Armistead Maupin, is a portrait of renowned novelist Armistead Maupin, author of the Tales of The City series of novels that were later adapted for PBS and Netflix. Featuring interviews with Laura Linney, Ian McKellen, Olympia Dukakis, Jonathan Groff, Neil Gaiman, Amy Tan, and Jewell Gomez, The Untold Tales of Armistead Maupin premiered at the 2017 South by Southwest Film Festival, where it won the Audience Award in the Documentary Spotlight section. It premiered on PBS's Independent Lens on January 1, 2018, and is currently streaming on Netflix.

In 2018, Kroot was invited to membership in the Academy of Motion Picture Arts and Sciences. She also co-writes a column for the San Francisco Bay Times about politics and culture in San Francisco.

== Filmography ==
Year	Title	Festival Premiere	Citation
2005	Sirens of the 23rd Century	Frameline	
2009	It Came from Kuchar	South by Southwest	
2014	To Be Takei	Sundance Film Festival	
2017	The Untold Tales of Armistead Maupin	South by Southwest	
2026	Hunky Jesus	BFI Flare	
