= Famous Accountants =

Coordinates: 40.70160°N 73.910216°W

Famous Accountants is a contemporary art gallery located in Ridgewood, in the New York City borough of Queens, near the border with the Bushwick, Brooklyn. It was founded in October 2009 by artists Kevin Regan and Ellen Letcher, who opened the space to carry on the community spirit of Austin Thomas's closed Pocket Utopia gallery. The gallery is located in the basement of a building on Gates Avenue that was owned for nearly 15 years by performance artist Genesis P-Orridge., and her late partner, Lady Jaye Breyer P-Orridge. Lady Jaye used the same space as her studio for many years, the only remnant being the number 23, used as the title of Famous Accountants' first exhibition, 23, 2009.

In a profile in The New York Times, P-Orridge claimed that she was "forced out [of the neighborhood] by the hipsters" and that she would relocate to the Lower East Side.

The gallery has drawn attention for its exhibitions featuring a broad range of materials and working methods, including both artist William Pappenheimer's curatorial project Tunneling, 2010, which surveyed new media and Matthew Miller's self-portraits painted using traditional methods from the Northern Renaissance. In January 2011 the gallery exhibited an installation by artist Andrew Ohanesian of an airplane jetway that the artist had built from new and discarded parts he sourced himself.

Artist William Powhida praised the inclusiveness of the Ridgewood / Bushwick artist community of which the gallery is a part, saying, “You can still have a BBQ outside of English Kills and host Sunday salons at Famous Accountants... Do you ever see that in Chelsea? Not so much.”
