= Marie Losier =

French filmmaker and curator (born 1972)

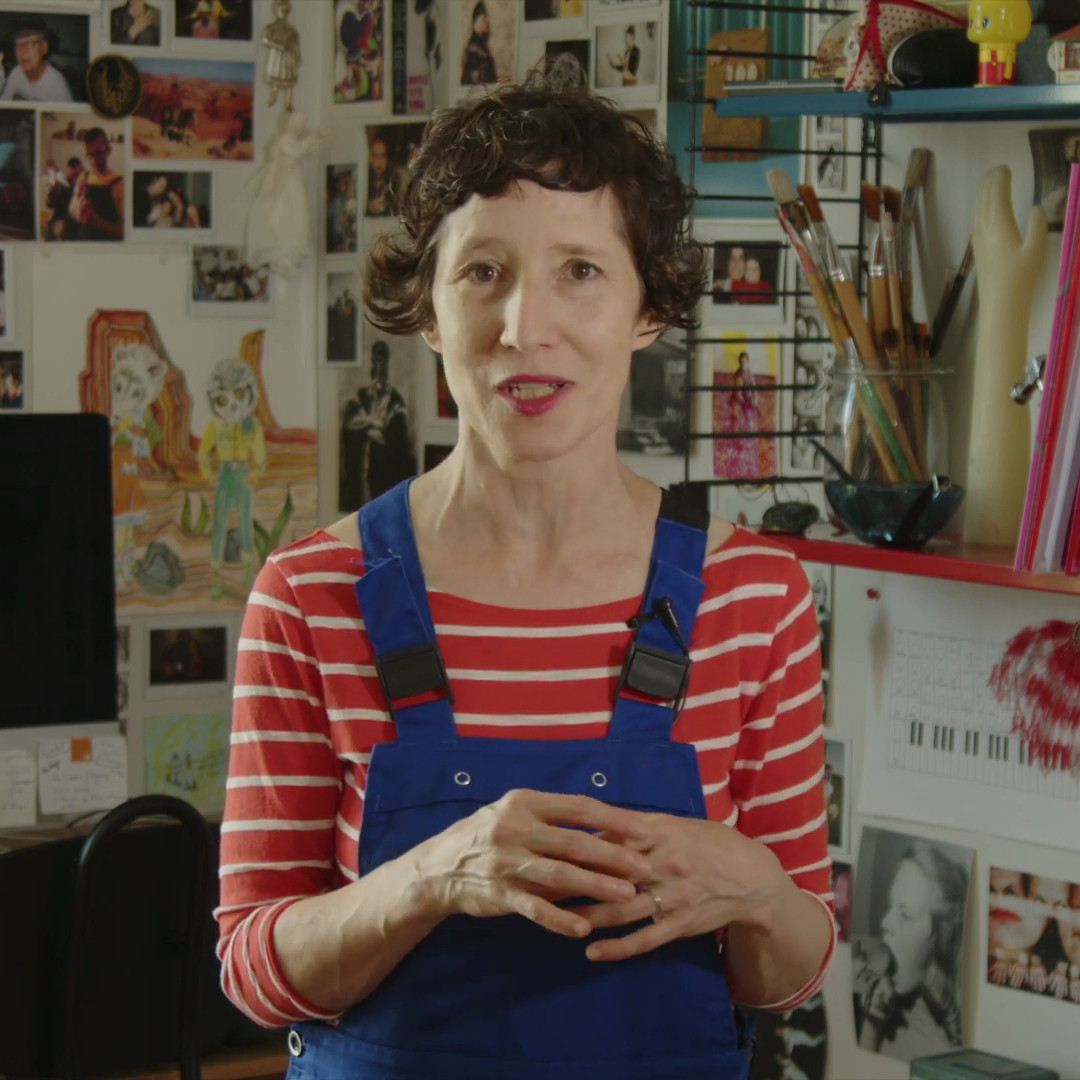
Marie Losier in 2023

Marie Losier (born 1972 in France) is a filmmaker and curator who has worked in New York City for 25 years and has shown her films and videos at museums, galleries, biennials and festivals. Losier studied literature at the University of Nanterre (France, BA, 1995) and Fine Arts at Hunter College in New York City (MFA, 2003). She has made a number of film portraits of avant-garde directors, musicians and composers, such as the Kuchar brothers, Guy Maddin, Richard Foreman, Tony Conrad, Genesis P-Orridge, Alan Vega, Peter Hristoff and Felix Kubin. Whimsical, poetic, dreamlike and unconventional, her films explore the life and work of these artists.

Losier’s films are regularly shown at prestigious venues such as The Cannes Film Festival, Le Jeu de Paume, The Berlinale, Rotterdam Film Festival, IDFA, Tribeca Film Festival, The Tate Modern, MoMA, Le Palais de Tokyo, Le Centre George Pompidou and La Cinematheque Francaise. She was included in the 2006 Whitney Biennial (Whitney Museum, N.Y.C.) She had a retrospective of her films at MoMA - Museum of Modern Art in 2018 in NYC, and a retrospective at Le Jeu De Paume - the Museum of Contemporary Art in Paris in 2019.

Losier’s first feature film was a portrait of pioneering musician-artist Genesis Breyer P-Orridge (of Throbbing Gristle and Psychic TV) and their partner Lady Jaye Breyer P-Orridge. The Ballad of Genesis and Lady Jaye premiered at the Berlin International Film Festival in February 2011, winning the Caligary and the Teddy Awards. She also won the Grand Prize at Indielisboa, the Prix Louis Marcorelles and the Prix des Bibliothèques at Cinema du Reel, and many more awards for the documentary. The film was released in France, Canada, Mexico, Germany and in the USA. In 2009 Genesis Breyer P-Orridge described Losier's filmmaking process "It’s a very new, radical way of making documentaries, and quite honestly, we think what Marie does and the way she does it will be the template for the future."

In 2013/14 Losier was awarded the prestigious DAAD Residency Award in Berlin and the Guggenheim Award to work on her new feature film Cassandro The Exotico!, a portrait of the celebrated Mexican wrestler Saul Almendariz.

She is currently an artist-in-residence at La Cité des Arts, Paris and her feature film Cassandro The Exotico! premiered at The Cannes Film Festival in May of 2018. It was released in France in December 2018 and will be in theaters in the US, opening at the Metrograph NYC in the summer of 2019.

Losier recently had a mid-career retrospective at MoMA NY and all of her films were acquired for the museum’s archives in November of 2018. She recently had an exhibition, in collaboration with Pauline Curnier Jardin, for the Fondation Ricard for May 2019.

She premiered a new film at Locarno International Film Festival in Switzerland in August 2019: a feature film on the German composer and musician, Felix Kubin (Felix in Wonderland!).

She presented a mid career retrospective for the Museum Le Jeu de Paume, Paris in November 2019 and for the Cinematheque of Athens (November 2019); a solo exhibition for Anne Barrault’s contemporary art gallery in Paris, where she exhibited photography, paintings and film installations (January 2020) (www.galerieannebarrault.com). She has a solo show at the Film Gallery in Paris now and is preparing a solo show for the Solar Gallery at Vila Do Conde in Portugal for 2022, and a solo show at the Contemporary Museum/Transpalette in Bourges for 2023.

For the past four years Losier has been the coordinator and director for first year MFA cinema students at LA HEAD in Geneva, Switzerland (Haute École d’Art et de Design à Genève) where she teaches 16mm filmmaking.

== Filmography ==
=== Feature-Length ===
- Felix in Wonderland! (2019), with Felix Kubin
- Cassandro, the Exotico! (2018), starring Saúl Armendáriz
- The Ballad of Genesis and Lady Jaye (2011), with Genesis P-Orridge, Lady Jaye, Psychic TV

=== Shorts ===
- Electric Storm, 100 Years of Theremine -music video- (2020), with Dorit Chrysler
- Download Yourself - music video - (2020)
- Which is witch? (2020)
- Images of a Work #22 : Infinite Now (2017)
- Masha Natasha (2015), co-directed with Fred Burle, Janin Halisch, and Cécile Tollu-Polonowski
- L'Oiseau de la nuit (2015)
- L’échappée Vive (2015), with Noël Dola & Ben Vaultier
- Peaches and Jesper are on a boat, who stays afloat? (2014), with Peaches and Jesper Just
- Bim, Bam, Boom, Las Luchas Morenas! (2014), with Cynthia, Esther, Alda, and Rossy Moreno
- Alan Vega, Just a Million Dreams (2013), with Alan Vega, Liz Lamere and Dante Vega
- Byun, Objet Trouvé (2012), with Byun Chong and Kiya Chong
- Cet Air Là (2010), with April March and Julien Gasc
- Slap the Gondola! (2010), with April March, Tony Conrad and Genesis P-Orridge
- Papal Broken Dance (2009), with Genesis P-Orridge
- DreaMinimalist (2008), with Tony Conrad
- Jaye Lady Jaye (2008), with Lady Jaye and PTV3
- Snow Beard (2008), with Mike Kuchar
- Manuelle Labor (2007), collaboration with Guy Maddin
- Flying Saucey! (2006), with Flux Factory
- The Ontological Cowboy (2005), with Richard Foreman
- Eat Your Makeup! (2005), with George Kuchar
- Electrocute Your Stars (2004), with George Kuchar
- Bird, Bath, and Beyond (2003), with Mike Kuchar
- Lunch Break on the Xerox Machine (2003)
- Sanitarium Cinema (2002)
- The Passion of Joan Arc (2002)
- Broken Blossoms (2002)
- Loula Meets Charlie (2002), video performance at The Ontological Theater
- The Touch Retouched (2002)
