= Whirlaway (album) =

Studio album by Tadpoles
- Released: 1999
- Recorded: 1998–1999
- Genre: Psychedelic rock
- Length: 1:10:32
- Label: Bakery Records and Camera Obscura Records
- Producer: Tadpoles

Tadpoles chronology
Smoke Ghost (1998)	Whirlaway (1999)	Use With Headphones Late At Night (Best of 1990-2000) (2001)

Professional ratings
Review scores
Source	Rating
Allmusic	4.5/5 stars

Whirlaway (1999) is the fourth and final full-length studio album released on CD by Tadpoles and is the first Tadpoles' album to be released by a label other than the band's own Bakery Records. Australian independent label, Camera Obscura Records, licensed and released the album worldwide. As a promotion in 1999, an edited MP3 version of the song "Whirlaway" was given away free from by Camera Obscura Records through their website. Additionally, this was the first studio album by Tadpoles not produced by Mark Kramer (Shimmy Disc) at Noise New Jersey, although Mark Kramer did record the album's final track, Horse and Buggy at New York City's Knitting Factory. The album was recorded by Pete Drivere at Ampreon Recorder in Youngstown, Ohio and features a cover version of Bob Dylan's Basement Tapes classic, You Ain't Goin' Nowhere.

== Track listing ==
1. "Frances The Dancer" (Max/Parker) – 5:04
2. "Lyman Bostock" (Kramer/Max) – 5:01
3. "Crash Of The Bug" (Parker/Max) – 7:53
4. "Jimmy Colored Glasses" (Parker) – 5:38
5. "Whirlaway" (Kramer/Parker/Max)) – 9:24
6. "Dusty Baker (Parker)" – 3:26
7. "You Ain't Goin' Nowhere" (Dylan) – 5:46
8. "Smile If You've Crossed Over" (Max/Boyette) – 8:06
9. "Sunrise Ocean Bender" (Parker) – 6:51
10. "Horse and Buggy" (Boyette/Max/Kramer/Parker) – 13:09

== Personnel ==
- Todd Parker - Vocals on 1,3,4,6,9 and Guitars, Keyboards
- Nick Kramer - Vocals on 2,5,7 and Guitars
- David Max - Bass and additional guitar on 3, effects on 8
- Adam Boyette - Drums and Percussion, effects on 8

=== Production ===
Whirlaway was engineered and mixed by Pete Drivere at Ampreon Recorder in Youngstown, Ohio in 1998 and 1999. Additional overdubs and mixes were done at Jolly Roger Studio in Hoboken, NJ by Gene Holder (the dB's). Album artwork and design was created by Ann Manca. Mastered by Todd Parker at dbs digital in Hoboken, NJ.
