= Curt McDowell =

American film director

- Born: January 9, 1945; Lafayette, Indiana
- Died: June 3, 1987 (aged 42); San Francisco, California
- Notable work: Thundercrack!

Curtis A. McDowell (January 9, 1945 – June 3, 1987) was an American underground filmmaker.

== Biography ==
McDowell was born in 1945 in Indiana. He moved to San Francisco in the late 1960s to study painting at the San Francisco Art Institute.

After switching to the filmmaking program at SFAI, McDowell studied under George Kuchar, who described his footage as the "prolific regurgitations of an 'enfant terrible.'" The two became romantic and artistic partners. McDowell directed the feature film Thundercrack! in 1975.

McDowell died from AIDS on June 3, 1987. He left his work to Robert Evans, who owned the Roxie Theater. After Evans also contracted HIV, he transferred ownership of McDowell's work to friends who established the Curt McDowell Foundation.

The Academy Film Archive has preserved a number of Curt McDowell's films, including Beaver Fever, Peed into the Wind, and Confessions.
