= Hunky Jesus =

2026 documentary film

- Directed by: Jennifer M. Kroot
- Produced by: Jennifer M. Kroot; Brian Benson; Gerry Kim; Christine Yoo
- Narrated by: George Takei
- Music by: Michael Hearst
- Release date: 2026
- Running time: 85 minutes
- Country: United States
- Language: English

Hunky Jesus is a 2026 American documentary film directed by Jennifer M. Kroot. The film is about the Sisters of Perpetual Indulgence. Several members are interviewed, including Sister Roma, Sister Vish-Knew, and Sister Flora Goodthyme. Much of the footage covers the group's 2023 Easter celebration in Dolores Park, which features the titular "Hunky Jesus" contest. The movie also covers the group's protests against Pope John Paul II when he visited San Francisco in 1987. Actor George Takei is the film's narrator.

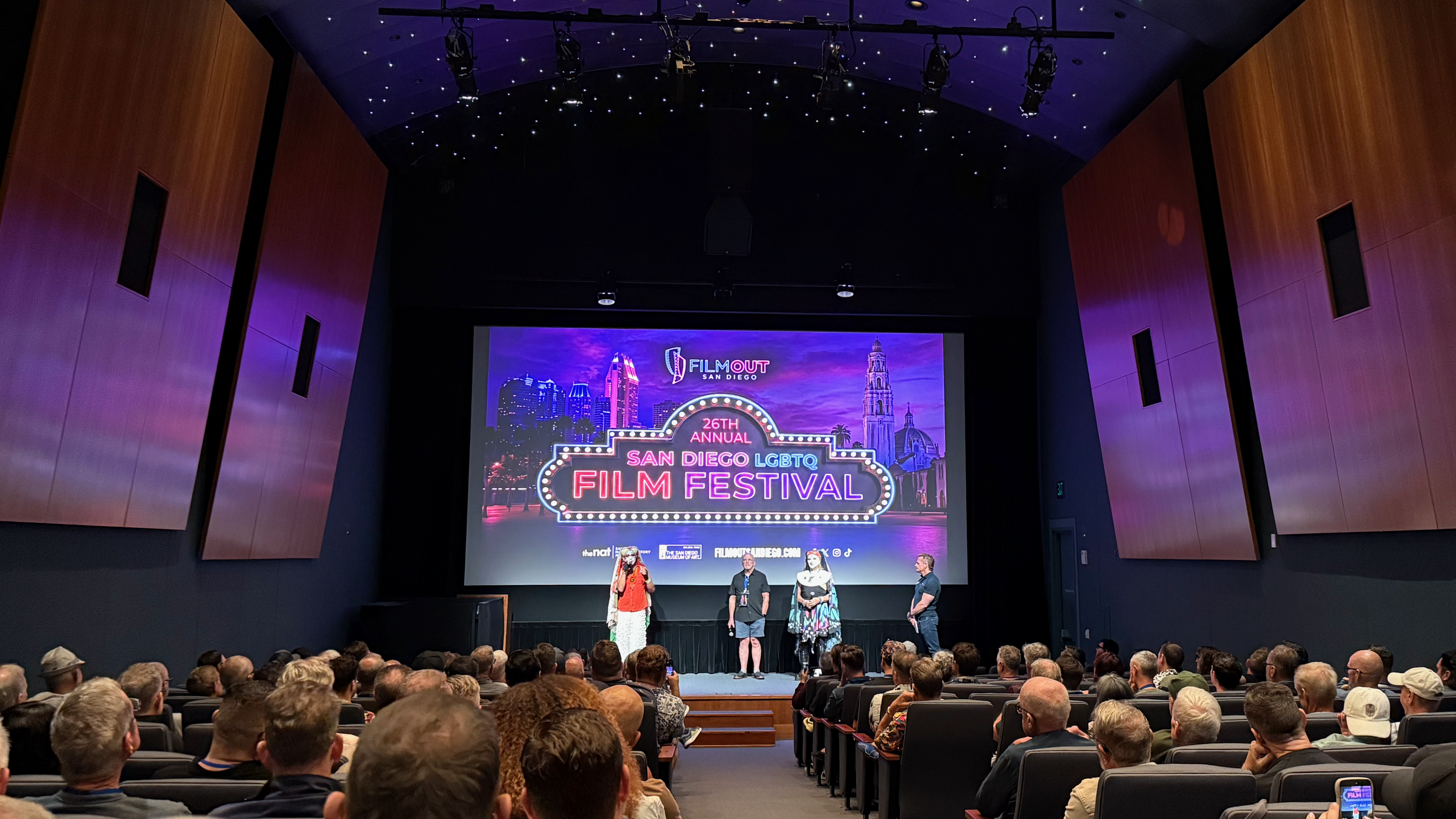
Members of the Sisters of Perpetual Indulgence introducing the film at FilmOut San Diego

The documentary has appeared at several film festivals, including BFI Flare on March 18, 2026, the Inside Out Film and Video Festival on May 24, 2026, the Provincetown International Film Festival on June 12, 2026, the Frameline Film Festival on June 26, 2026, FilmOut San Diego on August 22, 2026, and the Chéries-Chéris festival in Paris on October 18, 2026.
