= List of drama films of the 1950s =

Listicle of drama films from the 1950s

This is a list of drama films of the 1950s.

== 1950 ==
- Awaara
- The Capture
- Diary of a Country Priest
- Flowers of St. Francis
- In a Lonely Place
- Los Olvidados
- Seven Days to Noon
- Stromboli
- Sunset Boulevard
- The Ways of Love

== 1951 ==
- Ace in the Hole
- The African Queen
- The Browning Version
- Cry, the Beloved Country
- Early Summer
- Olivia
- A Place in the Sun
- Rashomon
- The River
- A Streetcar Named Desire

== 1952 ==
- 5 Fingers
- Affair in Trinidad
- Avalanche
- Bad and the Beautiful
- Casque d'Or
- cindrella!
- Come Back, Little Sheba
- Europe '51
- Flat Top
- Forbidden Games
- Ikiru
- Life of Oharu
- Member of the Wedding
- Mother
- Nagarik
- Othello
- Umberto D.
- Viva Zapata!

== 1953 ==
- A`isha
- The Earrings of Madame de...
- Gate of Hell
- A Geisha
- A Japanese Tragedy (Nihon No Higeki)
- The Thick-Walled Room
- Titanic
- Tokyo Story
- Two Acres of Land

== 1954 ==
- Boot Polish
- The Caine Mutiny
- Chikamatsu Monogatari
- The Country Girl
- A Generation
- Journey to Italy
- Late Chrysanthemums
- Magnificent Obsession
- On the Waterfront
- Sansho the Bailiff
- Seven Samurai
- La strada
- The Wild One

== 1955 ==
- Blackboard Jungle
- East of Eden
- I'll Cry Tomorrow
- Der letzte Akt
- Lola Montès
- The Man with the Golden Arm
- Ordet
- Pather Panchali
- Rebel Without a Cause
- Shree 420

== 1956 ==
- Anastasia
- And God Created Woman
- Aparajito
- Friendly Persuasion
- Giant
- The Great Man
- Lisbon
- Lust for Life
- A Man Escaped
- Requiem for a Heavyweight
- Somebody Up There Likes Me

== 1957 ==
- 12 Angry Men
- The Cranes Are Flying
- A Face in the Crowd
- A Hatful of Rain
- Man of a Thousand Faces
- Mother India
- Nights of Cabiria
- Pyaasa
- The Seventh Seal
- Sweet Smell of Success
- The Three Faces of Eve
- Throne of Blood
- Wild Strawberries

== 1958 ==
- Ajantrik
- Al-Tareeq al-Masdood
- Alto Paraná
- Les Amants
- Les Amants de Montparnasse
- Amor prohibido
- Another Time, Another Place
- Ashes and Diamonds
- Auntie Mame
- Bari Theke Paliye
- Cat on a Hot Tin Roof
- The Defiant Ones
- Human Condition, Part 1: No Greater Love
- I Want to Live!
- Jalsaghar
- Look Back in Anger
- Madhumati
- A Night to Remember
- The Old Man and the Sea
- Parash Pathar
- The Rikisha-Man
- Run Silent, Run Deep
- Separate Tables

== 1959 ==
- -30-
- The 400 Blows
- Anari
- Anatomy of a Murder
- Fires on the Plain
- Floating Weeds
- Imitation of Life
- Hiroshima Mon Amour
- Kaagaz Ke Phool
- Kapò
- Neel Akasher Neechey
- Room at the Top
- Shadows
- The World of Apu
