= Shadows (1958 film) =

1958 film by John Cassavetes

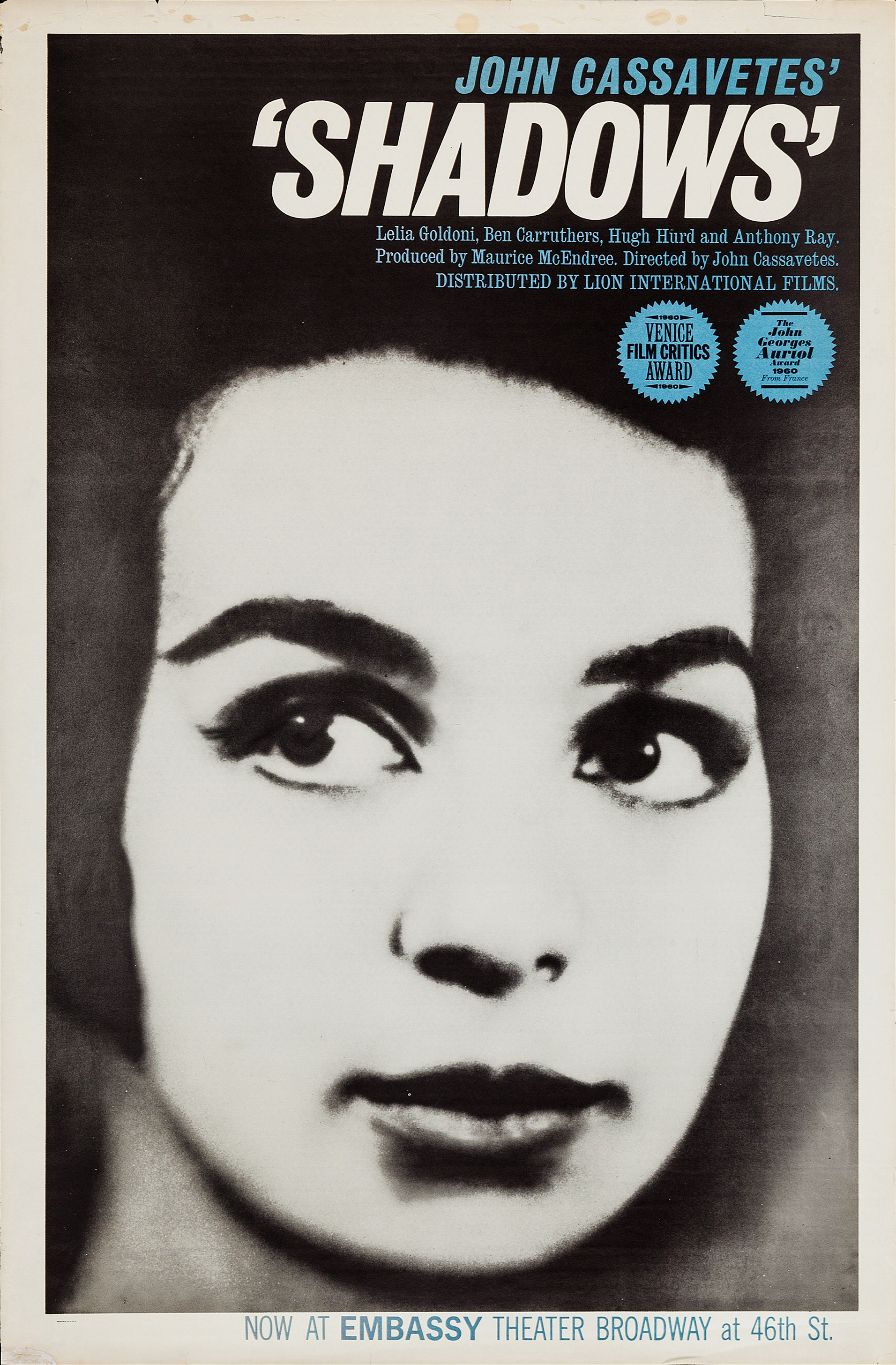
- Theatrical release poster
- Directed by: John Cassavetes
- Written by: John Cassavetes; Robert Alan Aurthur
- Produced by: Maurice McEndree; Nikos Papatakis
- Starring: Ben Carruthers; Lelia Goldoni; Hugh Hurd
- Cinematography: Erich Kollmar
- Edited by: Len Appelson; Maurice McEndree; Wray Bevins
- Music by: Charles Mingus; Shafi Hadi
- Distributed by: Lion International Films
- Release date: November 11, 1959
- Running time: 87 minutes
- Country: United States
- Language: English
- Budget: $40,000

Shadows is a 1958 American independent drama film directed by John Cassavetes about race relations during the Beat Generation years in New York City. The film stars Ben Carruthers, Lelia Goldoni, and Hugh Hurd as three black siblings. The film was initially shot in 1957 and shown in 1958, but a poor reception prompted Cassavetes to rework it in 1959. Promoted as a completely improvisational film, it was intensively rehearsed in 1957, and in 1959 it was fully scripted.

The film depicts two weeks in the lives of three siblings on the margins of society: two brothers who are struggling jazz musicians and their light-skinned younger sister who goes through three relationships, one with an older white writer, one with a shallow white lover, and finally one with a gentle young black admirer.

Film scholars consider Shadows a milestone of American independent cinema. In 1960, the film won the Critics Award at the Venice Film Festival.

In 1993, Shadows was selected for preservation in the United States National Film Registry by the Library of Congress as being "culturally, historically, or aesthetically significant".

== Plot ==
Light-skinned Ben, diffident and awkward, wants to be a jazz trumpeter, but spends most of his time drinking in Manhattan bars and trying to pick up girls with two fellow idlers, Dennis and Tom. He is supported by his darker-skinned brother Hugh, a jazz singer who is unable to find much work because of his old-fashioned vocal style. Hugh's career is managed by Rupert.

Ben and Hugh live with their fair-skinned younger sister Lelia, who wants to be an artist. Recently, she has been under the wing of an older boyfriend, the intellectual David, who encourages her to write and attempts to be helpfully critical of her efforts. At a party, Lelia abandons David for a younger man, Tony, who coaxes her back to his apartment. Tony professes his love for Lelia, and, despite her apparent apprehension, he takes her virginity. Afterward, she is filled with ambivalence and regret about Tony and about her first sexual encounter, but they agree to continue dating. Seeing her home, he is shocked to discover that her family is black. Sensing his racial animosity, Hugh kicks Tony out of the apartment, as he does not want his sister dating a perceived bigot.

Hugh has some guests over, and a friend urges Lelia to flirt with a gentlemanly black man named Davey. She is distant and contrary, but she and Davey arrange to go on a date. When Davey comes to pick Lelia up, she makes him wait for hours while she gets ready. As they are walking out the door, Tony arrives. He is disappointed to see her already dating another man, and she exits past him without a word. Hugh and Tony nearly come to blows, but Ben intervenes and listens to an apologetic message that he promises to relay to Lelia, though, after Tony leaves, Ben laughs at Tony with Hugh and Rupert. Lelia and Davey go dancing, and she continues to be rude, but softens after Davey asserts himself.

At the train station, Rupert informs Hugh that one of the two bookings of Hugh's upcoming tour has been canceled. He vents his frustration about their state of affairs, and, for once, it is Hugh who says some encouraging words to lift Rupert's spirits, instead of the other way around. Smiling, the friends get on the train for a week's billing in Chicago.

Ben, Dennis, and Tom drunkenly clown around with some girls in a bar. When the girls' tough male dates come out of the bathroom, tensions flare, and the two sides take their argument outside, where Ben, Dennis and Tom are badly beaten up. Over a drink, Ben tells his friends that he is tired of their way of living. Tom heads home, and, while Dennis goes to buy some cigarettes, Ben wanders off alone down the nighttime New York City streets.

== Cast ==
- Ben Carruthers as Ben
- Lelia Goldoni as Lelia
- Hugh Hurd as Hugh
- Anthony Ray as Tony
- Dennis Sallas as Dennis
- Tom Reese (credited as Tom Allen) as Tom
- David Pokitillow as David
- Rupert Crosse as Rupert
- Davey Jones as Davey

== Production ==
The idea for the film came from a classroom exercise. With acting coach Burt Lane (later the father of Diane Lane), Cassavetes was conducting classes for aspiring actors at the off-Broadway Variety Arts Theatre in Manhattan's Union Square neighborhood. The classes, listed as "The Cassavetes-Lane Drama Workshop", were Cassavetes' attempt to counter method acting, which was ascendant in New York theatre and film. A particular exercise became the core of the film: A young African-American woman who was very light-skinned dated a young white man, but he was repulsed when he discovered she had a black brother. Cassavetes determined to put the scene on film, so he began looking for funding. While ostensibly promoting the film Edge of the City on Jean Shepherd's Night People radio show on WOR in February 1957, Cassavetes said he could make a better film than could director Martin Ritt. He pitched the drama workshop idea to Shepherd's radio audience. Cassavetes was surprised when listeners sent about $2,000 to start the project. Money also came from Cassavetes' friends, including Hedda Hopper, William Wyler, Joshua Logan, Robert Rossen, José Quintero, and Cassavetes' agent Charlie Feldman. Cassavetes hired German cinematographer Erich Kollmar as cameraman, the only crew member except Cassavetes with any experience in film.

Using student actors from the Cassavetes-Lane Drama Workshop, shooting started in February 1957 in a largely improvised form. Cassavetes composed an outline for the film, but not a script. Cassavetes and assistant director/producer Maurice McEndree gave detailed instructions to the actors, constraining the situation to guide the story, with the words and the movements improvised by the actors. Cassavetes intended the story to evolve from the characters rather than vice versa. Three initial weeks of work was thrown out, the first week because of technical problems with quality, and the next two weeks because Cassavetes felt that the actors were talking too much. After they had developed their characters to the point at which they could portray emotion in silence, the actors improvised with more clarity and with a level of truth that Cassavetes found revealing. He was a demanding director who required a critical romantic scene to be performed more than 50 times before he was satisfied with the results. About 30 hours of film was exposed during several months of off-and-on shooting.

Filming took place in various locations, including inside the apartment that Cassavetes shared with his wife Gena Rowlands, and on the streets of New York. Using a 16 mm camera borrowed from Shirley Clarke, and monochrome film stock, Kollmar was forced to shoot scenes in which the actors could move in any direction they wished, making for unpredictable zoom and focus requirements. No filming permits were obtained, so the cast and crew were necessarily ready to pack quickly and leave a location. The lighting was a general wash rather than specific effects. The microphone was placed by Jay Crecco (who was also an actor in the film), and dialogue was recorded to tape with street noises intruding. Even though Cassavetes said "print it!" after he was satisfied with a scene, there was nobody on the crew keeping track of the film takes, so all of the exposed film had to be printed. The editing of the film was made much more difficult by the lack of notes taken during shooting, and by the sound recorded "wild" on tape, not synchronized with the film. The microphone failed to pick up some of the dialogue, requiring lip-readers to watch the footage and write down what had been said so that the actors could re-record their dialogue. Editors Len Appelson, Maurice McEndree and Wray Bevins began work while shooting was still under way, editing the film in an office next door to the Variety Arts Theatre, the office that is seen hosting a rock 'n roll party in the film. Primary photography was finished by mid-May 1957, with 60,000 ft (18,000 m) of film exposed, but the editing took more than a year. Cassavetes was not available during much of this time; starting in June, he was on location working as an actor first in Saddle the Wind, then in Virgin Island (both 1958). At the end of 1957, the editors moved to a professional editing suite to complete the task.

Cassavetes intended to have the jazz music of Charles Mingus on the soundtrack, but Mingus composed a number of songs that could stand on their own rather than impressionistic film music to follow the story. Three hours of Mingus and his band were recorded, and much of this material was placed in the first version of Shadows, screened in 1958, but almost all of it was removed during the 1959 reworking of the film. Two of Mingus' compositions for the film were subsequently included on the 1959 album Jazz Portraits: Mingus in Wonderland.

== 1958 screening ==
The film was finished late in 1958, printed onto 16 mm stock, and three free screenings were announced by Shepherd on his radio show. Cassavetes overestimated the audience; only about 100 people showed up for each of the midnight showings at Manhattan's Paris Theater, which could hold almost 600 people. At the first showing, there were initial problems with the sound, which were remedied. Some of the audience members were friends and colleagues of Cassavetes; he later said that 90% of them disliked the film. A number of people walked out before the film ended, including Burt Lane, who had coached most of the cast. Assistant cameraman Al Ruban told Cassavetes that the film was "okay in a kind of naive way". Cassavetes' father told him it was a "pure" film, not a good film. Cassavetes thought it was "totally intellectual" and thus "less than human". The poor reception made him decide that the film should be radically reworked.

However, avant-garde film critic Jonas Mekas highly praised the film, writing in the January 1959 issue of Film Culture that Shadows "presents contemporary reality in a fresh and unconventional manner... The improvisation, spontaneity, and free inspiration that are almost entirely lost in most films from an excess of professionalism are fully used in this film." The magazine, founded by Mekas and his brother, bestowed upon Shadows its first "Independent Film Award". Mekas then arranged to have the film shown six more times at the Young Men's Hebrew Association.

== 1959 reworking ==
Cassavetes shot new scenes in 1959 using a script that he co-wrote with Robert Alan Aurthur. The racial prejudice angle was reduced, and the three main characters were given more complications, as well as more time exploring their connectedness. With financing from Nikos Papatakis and others, Cassavetes reassembled the required members of the cast and crew. Half to two-thirds of the original footage was replaced, which angered those whose work was diminished. A 16 mm print was struck, and the new version was shown on November 11, 1959, at Amos Vogel's avant-garde Cinema 16, on a double bill with the 30-minute beat poetry film Pull My Daisy.

The first version was an ensemble performance, while the second version put more emphasis on Lelia. The revelation that she was African-American came much earlier in the second version. The first version had more of a conventional narrative, but its pace was slow in sections. It also contained a number of technical flaws, such as lip-sync errors. Lelia's date with Tony was greatly altered: in the first version, she only talks with him, but in the second version, she loses her virginity to him. The first version had more scenes of Ben and his friends hanging around Times Square. Actor Anthony Ray, the son of famous director Nicholas Ray, had top billing in the first version, playing the part of Lelia's date Tony, but in the second version, this billing was reduced to reflect his diminished screen time. His character was given greater dignity in the second version.

A major difference between the two versions was that Mingus' music was featured more in the first version, but the music was incongruously paired with the visuals, according to film critic Jonathan Rosenbaum. For the second version, Cassavetes replaced almost all of the Mingus recordings. For example, he removed a section in which a muted trumpet replaces the speech of character Tony on the phone, the sound mocking him. Another removed part involves the Mingus band shouting out a snatch of the gospel song "Leaning on the Everlasting Arms" during a scene in which Ben and his friends are recovering from a brutal fight. The first version also uses two Frank Sinatra songs that are not in the second version because Cassavetes could not obtain the rights. Mingus's saxophonist Shafi Hadi, previously known as Curtis Porter, provided most of the second version's soundtrack, expanding on a short passage that Mingus had written. Hadi was directed in his improvisation by Cassavetes, who acted out all the parts for him in the recording studio.

Another difference between the versions is that Ben's statement "I've learned a lesson" comes at the end of the second version, conveying to the viewer that Ben will improve himself after receiving such a cruel beating. This brings a sense of moral closure to the film. In the first version, the fight and Ben's statement appear halfway through the film, following which he is shown doing the same things again, having failed to learn his lesson. Thus, Ben is portrayed as unlikely ever to change his ways in the first version.

== Reception ==
In his December 1959 manifesto "A Call for a New Generation of Film Makers", Mekas said that Shadows was the start of a new movement that would inspire independent filmmakers, energize the flagging avant-garde film scene, and triumph over the commercial Hollywood film industry. Even so, he was upset that the film had been reworked. In January 1960, he wrote in his movie-review column in The Village Voice that the 1959 version was commercialized, "just another Hollywood film", and that everything he had praised in the first version had been "completely destroyed". Later in his life, he said that the first version should have never been remade, but that the second version was a better indication of the direction in which Cassavetes was going as a filmmaker.

When the film was first released it was generally thought of as a vehicle for group improvisations.

Shadows was given the Critics Award at the Venice Film Festival. Cassavetes obtained distribution through British Lion's Lion International Films in 1961.

== Legacy ==
The film was shocking to American audiences in the late 1950s and early 1960s because it turned the "concept of race upside down". Two of the principal actors portraying African-Americans were not actually black: Goldoni was born in the U.S. to Sicilian parents, fully European in heritage, and Carruthers was only one-sixteenth black. Carruthers used a sunlamp to darken his skin during the 1957 shooting of the film, but in 1959 for the new scenes, he abandoned this effort. Carruthers and Goldoni were married in 1960, but quickly divorced.

After Shadows was honored by the Venice Film Festival, the international publicity helped it become the first American film to see success outside of the Hollywood system. It joined Pull My Daisy and Shirley Clarke's The Connection to establish a new wave of American independent films.

In 1994, film critic Leonard Maltin said the film "was considered a watershed in the birth of American independent cinema".

On the review aggregator website Rotten Tomatoes, 100% of 21 critics' reviews are positive, with an average rating of 7.9/10. Metacritic, which uses a weighted average, assigned the film a score of 86 out of 100, based on 11 critics, indicating "universal acclaim".

=== 2003 rediscovery ===
The second version of the film, the result of the reshooting and reworking Cassavetes did in 1959, is the one that Cassavetes considered to be the final product, and he refused to show the 1958 version. In time, he lost track of the first version's only print, and for decades it was believed to have been lost or destroyed. In the 1980s, Cassavetes said he may have donated the film to a school far away. In fact, the 16 mm print of the first version had been left on a New York City subway train, taken to the subway's lost-and-found department, and then purchased by a second-hand-goods shop owner as part of a box of unclaimed items. The shop owner saw "Shadows" scratched into the leader on the first reel, but he did not recognize the film's name. The shop eventually went out of business, and the owner retired. The reels of film were stored in an attic in Florida, and, in November 2003, they were given by the shop owner's daughter to film professor Ray Carney, who had been searching for the print of the first version of Shadows since the 1980s. A digital copy was shown at the International Film Festival Rotterdam in late January 2004. Since then, few people have seen this version, as Rowlands and the Cassavetes estate have been involved in a legal dispute regarding Carney's use of the film.

== See also ==
- List of avant-garde films of the 1950s
- List of cult films: S
- List of directorial debuts
- List of drama films of the 1950s
- List of films set in New York City
- List of interracial romance films
- List of rediscovered films
- Too Late Blues, Cassavetes' second film from 1961
