= Anita Needs Me =

- Directed by: George Kuchar
- Starring: James Brawly; George Kuchar; Stella Kuchar; Maulis Pearson
- Release date: 1963
- Running time: 16 minutes
- Country: United States

Anita Needs Me is a 1963 short film directed by George Kuchar about an overheated tale of lust, guilt and Mom (made as a response to the French New Wave) and starring Maulis Pearson as Anita. It has a runtime of 16 minutes.
