= It Came from Kuchar =

- Theatrical release poster
- Directed by: Jennifer Kroot
- Produced by: Jennifer Kroot; Tina Kroot; Holly Million
- Starring: George Kuchar; Mike Kuchar
- Cinematography: Christopher Million
- Edited by: Jesse Spencer
- Release date: March 14, 2009 (South by Southwest)
- Running time: 86 minutes
- Country: United States
- Language: English

It Came from Kuchar is a 2009 documentary film about twin underground filmmakers George Kuchar and Mike Kuchar directed by Jennifer Kroot (a former student of George Kuchar at the San Francisco Art Institute) and produced by Tigerlily Films LLC. The film includes commentary by John Waters, Christopher Coppola, Wayne Wang, B. Ruby Rich, Atom Egoyan, Guy Maddin, Bill Griffith, and Buck Henry.

Funding for the film came from the Andy Warhol Foundation, Creative Work Fund, The Fleishhacker Foundation, San Francisco Arts Commission, and Frameline.

== Premier ==
The film premiered at the South by Southwest film festival in Austin, Texas on March 14, 2009, and was shown at Frameline in San Francisco and at CineVegas in June 2009, and at Outfest in July 2009.

== Cast ==
As themselves:

- George Kuchar
- Mike Kuchar
- Buck Henry
- John Waters
- B. Ruby Rich
- Atom Egoyan
- Wayne Wang
- Cory McAbee
- Guy Maddin
- Christopher Coppola
- Donna Kerness
- Bill Griffith
- Gerard Malanga
- Jeffrey Schwarz
- David Weissman
- Larry Leibowitz
- Larry Jordan
- John Carlson
- Bob Cowan
- Dan Carbone
- Floraine Connors
- Mike Diana
- Linda Martinez
- Melinda McDowell-Milks
- Andy Rodriguez
- V. Vale
- Marian Wallace

== Reception ==
The film has received a majority of favorable reviews. Rotten Tomatoes currently gives the film a 94 percent positive rating, 15 positive reviews out of 16, with an average rating of 7.5/10.
