= Destroy Terrastock – Live =

Destroy Terrastock - Live

Live album by Tadpoles
- Released: 1998
- Recorded: 1997
- Genre: Psychedelic rock
- Length: 0:35:09
- Label: Bakery Records
- Producer: Tadpoles

Tadpoles chronology
Know Your Ghosts E.P. (1997)	Destroy Terrastock - Live (1998)	Smoke Ghost (1999)

Professional ratings
Review scores
Source	Rating
Allmusic	0/0 stars
Minneapolis City Pages	(Favorable)

Destroy Terrastock – Live (1998) is the only live album released on CD by Tadpoles. Upon original release, Bakery Records included a copy of Tadpoles' Destroy Terrastock - Live with all mail-orders for Smoke Ghost, though the former album was later made available for sale on its own. It was recorded live at the first Terrastock music festival on April 25–27, 1997 at The Rogue Lounge in Providence, RI, and includes the band's entire set.

== Track listing ==
1. "Race You To The Mustard Patch" (Max/Parker) – 5:20
2. "When I Feel" (Kramer) – 4:49
3. "At Least I'm Not Like Jonathan Carver" (Kramer/Max/Parker) – 5:52
4. "Nazareth" (Parker) – 5:13
5. "Ride The World Around The Sun" (Parker) – 4:44
6. "Umbrella Smile (Parker)" – 4:16
7. "Firecracker" (Kramer) – 4:54

== Personnel ==
- Todd Parker - Vocals on 1,3,5,6 and Guitars
- Nick Kramer - Vocals on 2,4,8 and Guitars
- David Max - Bass
- Adam Boyette - Drums and Percussion

=== Production ===
Destroy Terrastock - Live was recorded live to digital multi-track and was mixed by Tadpoles without additional overdubs. Album artwork and design was created by Ann Manca. The cover and title is a take on a bootleg album by Kiss (band) called "Kiss Destroys Anaheim." Mastered by Todd Parker at dbs digital in Hoboken, NJ.
