= Hold Me While I'm Naked =

1966 film by George Kuchar

- Directed by: George Kuchar
- Written by: George Kuchar
- Starring: George Kuchar; Donna Kerness; Stella Kuchar; Andrea Lunin
- Release date: 1966
- Running time: 15–17 minutes
- Country: United States
- Language: English

Hold Me While I'm Naked is a 1966 American underground short 16 mm film directed by George Kuchar. It stars Kuchar, Donna Kerness, Stella Kuchar, and Andrea Lunin. The most popular and acclaimed of Kuchar's filmography of over 200 films – it was voted 52nd in Village Voice's Critics' Poll of the 100 Best Films of the 20th Century.

== Plot ==
The film is about a depressed, sexually frustrated independent director whose actress quits due to too many nude scenes. It features partial nudity and sex scenes; the actress and her boyfriend make love in the shower. In summary, "a very direct and subtle, very sad and funny look at nothing more or less than sexual frustration and aloneness", according to the Ann Arbor Film Festival, who screened it in 2012.

== Production ==
Like the majority of Kuchar's films, it stars himself, members of his family, and friends. After regular actress Donna Kerness had to withdraw from the film because of illness, he turned the focus of this 16 mm film upon himself as the director of the film within the film.

== Reception ==
Hold Me While I'm Naked is the best known and most acclaimed of Kuchar's films, and ranked 52nd in the Critics' Poll of the 100 best films of the 20th century that appeared originally in The Village Voice (4 January 2000). It is also included in the book 1001 Movies You Must See Before You Die, where critic Marc Siegel calls it "a charming and melodramatic tour de force of underground invention", which "attains a level of emotional seriousness that makes it stand out among the camp and trash Hollywood parodies to which it is inevitably compared. Siegel praised the technical and creative skills of the director, highlighting his "stunning title and production design, ingenious inventory of odd and unflattering camera angles and his insatiable talent at adapting the glamorous concerns and emotional extremes of Hollywood flicks to banal realities and human proportions of his neighborhood friends". Ken Kelman referred to the film as "a perfect fusion of mock-Hollywood and mock-avant-garde styles". Authors Sébastien Lefait and Philippe Ortoli compared it to films such as Ron Rice's Flower Thief and Jack Smith's Flaming Creatures, in that it developed "bastard aesthetics-both in the sense of a degraded, lower quality version of Hollywood aesthetics, and as a more vulgar sexually explicit version of Hollywood plots".

Ken Kelman said:

"A very direct and subtle, very sad and funny look at nothing less than sexual frustration and aloneness. In its economy and cogency of imagining and imaging, HOLD ME surpasses any of Kucher's previous work. The odd blend of glamour and drama with all-too-real life creates and inspires counterpoint of unatttainable desire against undearable actuality."

== See also ==
- List of American films of 1966
