= Hugh Hurd =

American actor (1925–1995)

- Hugh Hurd in Shadows 1958
- Born: Hugh Lincoln Hurd; February 11, 1925; New York City
- Died: July 15, 1995 (aged 70); New York City
- Occupations: Actor, civil rights activist
- Spouse: Merlyn Purdy
- Children: 4, including Michelle Hurd

Hugh Lincoln Hurd (February 11, 1925 – July 15, 1995) was an American actor and civil rights activist. Hurd had a leading role in John Cassavetes' debut 1959 feature film Shadows. He was an organizer of African-American actors.

== Biography ==
Hugh Lincoln Hurd was born on February 11, 1925. His most notable acting roles were as the male lead in the 1959 film Shadows directed by John Cassavetes and a major role in the Japanese film The Catch (1961), as a prisoner of war. He also had roles in The Winner (1963), For Love of Ivy (1968), The Hot Rock (1972), Blade (1973), A Woman Under the Influence (1974), The First Deadly Sin (1980), Liebestraum (1991), Jumpin' at the Boneyard (1992), and Who's the Man? (1993). He performed other minor roles in television and commercials. His last film appearance was in the 1995 documentary Anything for John. Hurd performed minor theatrical roles in The Threepenny Opera, The Little Foxes, and Four Saints in Three Acts.

Hurd was active in organizing work that combated racial discrimination against African Americans in general and African-American actors in particular. In the late 1950s at the Village Gate nightclub, he co-organized with Godfrey Cambridge and Maya Angelou to fund raise $9,000 for Martin Luther King Jr. during the civil rights movement. He co-founded the Committee for the Employment of Negro Performers with Godfrey Cambridge in 1962.

In 1964, Hurd was the subject of a portrait painted by the noted artist Alice Neel. The painting is titled "Hugh Hurd" and is currently held by Crystal Bridges Museum of American Art.

Hurd died on July 15, 1995, in New York City within Greenwich Village at St. Vincent's Hospital. According to his family, Hurd died from complications from hypertension and kidney failure.

== Personal life ==
Hurd was married once, to Dr. Merlyn Hurd (née Purdy), an actress and later a clinical psychologist, who he met when they appeared in the same Broadway show. They were a racially-mixed couple, with Hurd being black and Merlyn being white. They had three daughters; Denise, Adrienne, and Michelle Hurd, known for her roles in the television series Law & Order: Special Victims Unit, Blindspot and Star Trek: Picard. Michelle would later also be elected secretary-treasurer of SAG-AFTRA in 2025. He also had a fourth daughter from a previous relationship.

== Filmography ==
Feature films
Year	Title	Role	Ref
1959	Shadows	Hugh Carruthers / Hugh Hurd	
1961	The Catch	Black soldier held captive	
1962	Mafioso	Frank	
1963	The Winner	Cast member	
1968	For Love of Ivy	Jerry	
1972	The Hot Rock	Cast member	
1973	Blade	Attorney	
1974	A Woman Under the Influence	Willie Johnson	
1980	The First Deadly Sin	Ben Johnson	
1991	Liebestraum	Orderly #2	
1992	Jumpin' at the Boneyard	Man at coffee shop	
1993	Who's the Man?	Mushmouth	

== See also ==
- List of avant-garde films of the 1950s
