= Thundercrack! =

1975 film directed by Curt McDowell

- Original theatrical release poster
- Directed by: Curt McDowell
- Screenplay by: George Kuchar
- Story by: Mark Ellinger; Curt McDowell
- Produced by: Charles Thomas; John Thomas
- Starring: Marion Eaton; Ken Scudder; Melinda McDowell; George Kuchar
- Cinematography: Curt McDowell
- Edited by: Curt McDowell
- Music by: Mark Ellinger
- Distributed by: Thomas Brothers Film Studio
- Release date: December 29, 1975
- Running time: 159 minutes
- Country: United States
- Language: English

Thundercrack! is a 1975 black comedy horror film written, edited, shot and directed by Curt McDowell, and written by George Kuchar based on a story by McDowell and Mark Ellinger. It stars Marion Eaton, Ken Scudder, Melinda McDowell and George Kuchar. Combining an "old dark house" mystery with hardcore sex scenes, Thundercrack! is more recently regarded as a cult film. It bears the influences of Jack Smith's lush, DIY, camp aesthetic, and Nan Goldin's glimpses of countercultural bohemia.

== Plot ==
A caller, Willene Cassidy (Maggie Pyle), visits Mrs. Gert Hammond (Marion Eaton) at her estate, the Prairie Blossom. Mrs. Hammond is very drunk but tries to make herself presentable before she answers the door. This takes a very long time and she makes a bad job of putting on her makeup. In an effort to get the alcohol out of her system, Hammond makes herself vomit by putting her fingers down her throat. Finally, having retrieved her wig from the toilet, where it fell during her vomiting, she is ready to greet her visitor.

Willene is shocked at the dishevelled appearance of Mrs. Hammond and insists on giving her a bath. Willene explains that her husband is a very famous yet untalented country music star, Simon Cassidy, whose music is heard on the radio during the later scene. During the bath, Willene unintentionally masturbates Mrs. Hammond. It is also revealed that Mr. Hammond died and that their son "no longer exists".

As the night goes on, more and more visitors appear to shelter from the storm. Among them is Chandler (Mookie Blodgett), widower of the incredibly wealthy Sarah Lou Phillips, whose family owns the largest girdle factory in the United States. Their popularity is such that few American women are without one. Chandler relates the story of his wife's death. She burned to death at a cocktail party, where there was a freak accident and her girdle caught fire. This caused burning rubber to envelop her head, and finally she fell dead into the swimming pool, her head steaming.

The manner of her death causes Chandler to have a sexual dysfunction. Although initially attracted to women, these women would invariably prove to be owners of House of Phillips girdles. When they took off their clothes before sex, he would be reminded of the death of his wife and would not be able to maintain an erection. For this reason he had been having sex with other men, as they do not wear girdles.

During the telling of this story, Chandler is being fellated by Sash (Melinda McDowell) and has no apparent erectile problems. The two, while in the basement, discover that Mrs. Hammond had pickled the remains of her husband and kept them in a jar. She tells of the death of her husband, who had been working in the grain bin and got covered with grain dust. A swarm of locusts dived on him to eat the dust and in the process devoured much of Mr. Hammond's body.

During the course of the night, many of the guests have sex with each other in various combinations. There are a great many sex toys at Mrs. Hammond's home. She explains that her son collected them. They would be delivered in plain brown packages which she would take to him with his morning breakfast. This causes her to wistfully repeat that he "no longer exists". One of the guests, a man named Toydy (Rick Johnson), becomes obsessed with finding the key to a locked door in the house. One of the female guests, Roo (Moira Benson), finds the key but will not give it to Toydy unless he agrees to ejaculate in her mouth. Despite not finding her attractive, Toydy agrees and manages to stay aroused by watching Bond (Ken Scudder) and Willene have sex.

The final human guest, Bing (George Kuchar), arrives in an agitated state. He had come from the circus in a vehicle containing a toothless lion, a near-blind elephant, and a female gorilla named Medusa. He explains to the group that Medusa is extremely dangerous and is likely to kill anyone she comes across. It is revealed that Bing himself is the cause of the ape's murderous tendencies. His circus-mates, having got Bing drunk, convinced him to have sex with a prostitute. Despite her being hirsute, Bing is too drunk to decline. The next morning, he awakens to the pleasant feeling of being masturbated, though to his horror, the act is being carried out by Medusa, who now has a severe crush on him. She soon realises that her feelings are not being reciprocated and becomes enraged with him, and indeed all men. However, subsequent mistreatment by a female circus-worker causes these feelings to spread to women as well. The only way to calm Medusa is by giving her bananas.

Toydy, having watched Bond and Willene have sex, decides to lie to Bond in order to have sex with him. Toydy says that he has a crate of bananas and will give them to Bond if he will have sex with him. Bond considers this carefully, not having had a homosexual encounter before, but agrees on the strength that he and Willene (who has by now forgotten about her husband) can use the bananas to escape the murderous primate. On discovering the deception, Bond takes it in his stride and tells Willene he had to be broken in sometime. He jokes that if things do not work out between himself and her, he can always try for her husband.

Meanwhile, Toydy, having gained the key to the locked door, opens it with Roo to discover Prairie Blossom's terrible secret. By morning, the fate of Roo and Toydy is unknown to the others. Chandler and Sash leave together, as do Bond and Willene, though Bond tells her he likes to sleep around too much to really settle down. Bing has married Medusa, though he wore the wedding dress. Mrs. Hammond, alone with the jar containing her husband, proposes a toast to love, and pours Mr. Hammond's drink into his jar.

== Cast ==
- Marion Eaton as Mrs. Gert Hammond
- Ken Scudder as Bond
- Melinda McDowell as Sash
- George Kuchar as Bing
- Mookie Blodgett as Chandler
- Bernie Boyle as Señor Tostada
- Mark Ellinger as Charlie Hammond
- Maggie Pyle as Willene Cassidy
- Laurie Hendricks as Mrs. Cassidy
- Moira Benson as Roo
- Rick Johnson as Toydy
- Virginia Giritlian as Sarah Lou Phillips
- Billy Paradise as Mrs. Harlan
- Pamela Primate as Medusa
- John Thomas as Simon Cassidy
- Margo O'Connor
- Roy Ramsing
- Gael Sikula

== Release ==
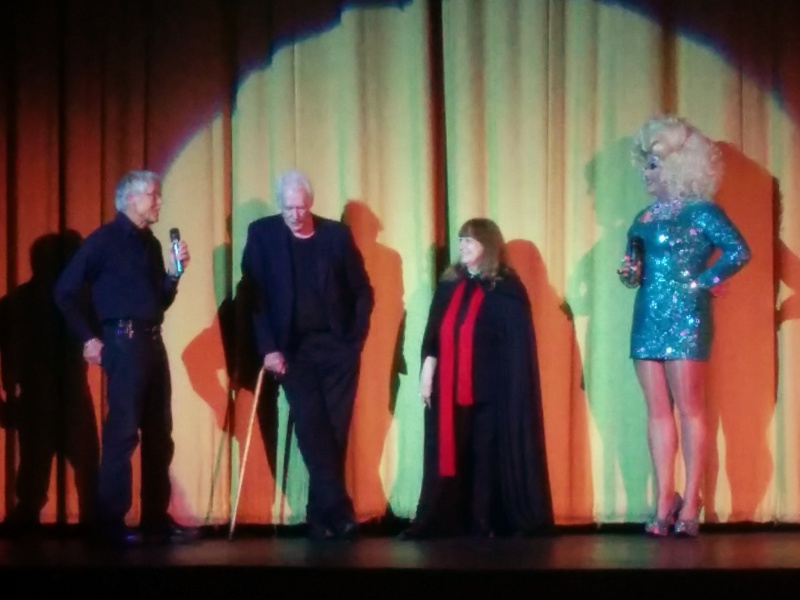
Ken Scudder, Mark Ellinger, and Melinda McDowell at a screening with Peaches Christ in 2015

Because of its graphic sex including masturbation, heterosexual and homosexual couplings, the film is unavailable in many areas of the world. However, the film is available on DVD in parts of Europe. Synapse Films was working closely with the director's sister and Thundercrack! actress, Melinda McDowell for a 35th anniversary DVD edition originally due to be released in 2010. In a film fan blog published June 7, 2013, the owners of Synapse Films say they are still working on an upcoming release of the film. The Synapse Blu-Ray/DVD was released in 2015 for the film's 40th anniversary.

On December 11, 2015, for the film's fortieth anniversary, Thundercrack! screened at the Castro Theatre in San Francisco, California, in an event hosted by drag queen Peaches Christ.

== Reception ==
The film is unusual for its time as it is shot in black-and-white and features graphic sexual acts. In terms of its intentional tastelessness, it could be compared to the films of John Waters.

== Home media ==
The Dutch Shock DVD is available semi-officially (the company were also responsible for its limited release in the 90s on VHS); however, the DVD is struck from the same master as the VHS and the image is poorly transferred. The frequent scratches in it are present on the 16mm source print. The film was edited down from 153 minutess by its backers The Thomas Brothers in the hope of making it more marketable.

A new DVD and Blu-ray version was released on December 8, 2015, from cult distributor Synapse Films. This release features a high-definition transfer of the film in its original filmed aspect ratio of 1.33:1. The Blu-ray includes such special features as rare interview footage of director McDowell presented in the form of an audio commentary, a behind-the-scenes documentary titled It Came from Kuchar, a documentary about George and Mike Kuchar, and a bonus DVD including interviews, audition footage, short films, and outtakes.

It can also be viewed on the BFI streaming service in its original length.

== See also ==
- List of American films of 1975
