= To Be Takei =

- Promotional poster
- Directed by: Jennifer M. Kroot
- Produced by: Jennifer M. Kroot; Mayuran Tiruchelvam; Gerry Kim
- Cinematography: Christopher Million
- Edited by: Bill Weber
- Music by: Michael Hearst
- Production companies: Dodgeville Films; Rainbow Shooting Star Pictures
- Distributed by: Starz Digital Media
- Release date: January 18, 2014 (Sundance)
- Running time: 93 minutes
- Country: United States
- Language: English

To Be Takei is a 2014 American documentary film produced and directed by Jennifer M. Kroot. The film had its world premiere at the Sundance Film Festival on January 18, 2014.

After its premiere at Sundance, Starz Digital Media acquired the distribution rights of the film. The film had a theatrical release in 2014.

== Synopsis ==
Known for his role as the helmsman of the U.S.S. Enterprise, Lieutenant Hikaru Sulu, on Star Trek: The Original Series, To Be Takei narrates the life and journey of actor, author and activist George Takei, featuring interviews with fellow Star Trek actors William Shatner, Leonard Nimoy, Nichelle Nichols, and John Cho.

== Reception ==
To Be Takei received positive reviews from critics. On the review aggregator website Rotten Tomatoes, the film has a rating of 89%, based on reviews from 47 critics. The website's consensus reads, "To Be Takei rests almost entirely on its subject's inherent likability -- and, for the most part, that's more than enough." On Metacritic, it has a score of 66 out of 100, based on reviews from 17 critics.

Ronnie Scheib of Variety, said in his review that "A unique blend of camp and conviction, To Be Takei deftly showcases George Takei's eclectic personality and wildly disparate achievements, from Star Trek crewmate to gay-rights activist." David Rooney in his review for The Hollywood Reporter praised the film by saying that "In its most compelling arc, the film traces American-born Takei's childhood memories of being transported with his parents and sister after Pearl Harbor, along with countless other Japanese American West Coast citizens, to an internment camp in Arkansas fringed by barbed wire and sentry towers." However, they were critical of its narrative structure, saying "Kroot's inability to sculpt a robust narrative stops the film from soaring, instead jumbling its various threads into a multifaceted portrait that starts strongly but loses focus precisely when it needs to come together."

Drew Taylor of Indiewire grade the film B by saying that "By the end of its slender 90-minute running time, though, you'll wish that To Be Takei had been more like its subject -- impossible to pin down and uncomfortably hilarious." Jordan Hoffman in his review for ScreenCrush, gave the film seven out of ten and said that To Be Takei isn't a groundbreaking biographical documentary like, say, Terry Zwigoff's Crumb, but it is very ... agreeable ... to spend time listening to George Takei make jokes and laugh in that deep, soothing voice of his. Despite the setbacks and persecution (he and Brad felt the need to stay closeted for years), this is a man filled with warmth and compassion, boldly going where few public figures-turned-activists have gone before."

Writing for RogerEbert.com, Odie Henderson awarded it three out of four stars, saying "Conventional documentary or not, I got something of positive value and insight out of "To Be Takei." IGN awarded it 8 out of 10, saying "Star Trek legend George Takei is the subject of a new documentary that highlights his career and activism." Slant Magazine also awarded it a positive review, saying "To Be Takei works most productively when allowing Takei's acting career to speak for itself on screen."

=== Accolades ===
The film won the Audience Award at the San Diego Asian Film Festival's 2014 Spring Showcase.
