= Sins of the Fleshapoids =

- Directed by: Mike Kuchar
- Release date: 1965
- Running time: 43 minutes
- Country: United States
- Language: English

Sins of the Fleshapoids is a 1965 underground film directed by Mike Kuchar. It is a low-budget, campy sci-fi movie about an android revolt a million years in the future after humans have become too lazy and selfish to take care of themselves.

== Plot summary ==
One million years in the future, human beings have created a race of human-looking androids called Fleshapoids to fulfill their every desire. As a result, humans have become selfish and lazy as they no longer need to work or do anything to take care of themselves.

One day, a Fleshapoid named Xar (Bob Cowan) revolts, kills his female human master (Gina Zuckerman) and hooks up with a female Fleshapoid named Melenka (Maren Thomas), who services Prince Gianbeno (George Kuchar) and Princess Vivianna (Donna Kerness). While Xar and Melenka fall in love in secret, the marriage between the Prince and Princess is falling apart. As the Princess tries to deceive her husband and run away with her lover, Ernie (Julius Middleman), the Prince uncovers the Fleshapoids' illicit romance and attempts to stop them. But Xar flips out again and he and Melenka kill the Prince. But, with death also comes life, as Xar and Melenka's unusual lovemaking produces a cute baby robot.

== Production ==
Sins of the Fleshapoids was the first film Mike Kuchar directed himself after co-directing movies with his twin brother George Kuchar for many years. However, on the commentary track of the Other Cinema DVD release, Mike reveals that George did shoot a quick sequence in which a semi-nude Princess Vivianna admires herself in a mirror.

The film was shot in 16mm and has a musical soundtrack, but all of the dialogue, rather than being spoken, is printed in giant word balloons that appear directly on the screen.

Financing from the film came from the paychecks Mike Kuchar earned while working a day job as a photo retoucher. However, after the film became a modest midnight movie success, Mike was able to quit his job and live off of the income he made from Sins of the Fleshapoids and other films.

== Reception and legacy ==
The film was a major influence on cult director John Waters who has said that Sins of the Fleshapoids "really shows what an underground movie was."
