= The First Deadly Sin =

1980 film by Brian G. Hutton

- Theatrical release poster
- Directed by: Brian G. Hutton
- Screenplay by: Mann Rubin
- Based on: The First Deadly Sin by Lawrence Sanders
- Produced by: Frank Sinatra; Elliott Kastner; George Pappas; Mark Shanker
- Starring: Frank Sinatra; Faye Dunaway; James Whitmore; David Dukes; Brenda Vaccaro; Martin Gabel; Anthony Zerbe
- Cinematography: Jack Priestley
- Music by: Gordon Jenkins
- Production company: Artanis-Cinema VII Production
- Distributed by: Filmways
- Release date: October 23, 1980
- Running time: 112 minutes
- Country: United States
- Language: English
- Budget: $8 million
- Box office: $3.9 million

The First Deadly Sin is a 1980 American crime thriller film directed by Brian G. Hutton and starring Frank Sinatra, Faye Dunaway, David Dukes, Brenda Vaccaro, James Whitmore, and Martin Gabel in his final film role. It follows New York City Police Department inspector Edward Delaney as he attempts to care for his ailing wife while also tracking a violent serial killer murdering civilians with an ice axe. It is based on the 1973 novel of the same name by Lawrence Sanders, adapted for the screen by Mann Rubin. Sinatra served as a co-producer on the film.

The film originally was slated to be directed by Roman Polanski, who was dropped by Columbia Pictures after statutory rape charges were brought against him. Director Hutton took over the production after Polanski fled to France. The First Deadly Sin was the third production by Sinatra's Artanis production company and was shot on location in New York City.

The First Deadly Sin premiered in New York City on October 23, 1980, distributed by Filmways. The musical score was by composer and arranger Gordon Jenkins, who first worked with Sinatra on the 1957 album Where Are You?

== Plot ==
Bernard Gilbert is murdered by an ice axe-wielding man outside Mount Pleasant Baptist Church on West 81st Street in Manhattan while Barbara Delaney undergoes emergency surgery at Mother Cabrini Hospital. Her husband, NYPD Sergeant Edward Delaney, is processing the crime scene with the coroner who shows him the fatal wound on Gilbert's skull was made with a round object. The 20th Precinct passes the news that Barbara is recovering from surgery and Edward rushes to the hospital. Doctor Vincent Bernardi explains that complications from her kidney stones forced him to remove the organ.

Barbara's condition worsens, and Delaney harbors deep suspicions that Bernardi is incompetent. Finding the murder on 81st Street a kind of escape from worrying about his wife, Delaney throws himself into the case. He consults with Arms and Armor curator Christopher Langley of the Metropolitan Museum of Art about weapons that could create round wounds. The elderly Langley is thrilled to have such a unique problem to solve. Calculating that the weapon must have been some kind of tool, he visits a hardware store and asks for the best implement to kill someone. A bemused helps Langley conclude the weapon was most likely an ice axe.

Delaney reviews a similar recent attack on West 79th Street, finding the wound patterns nearly identical. Further investigation reveals similar attacks all over New York City. Langley locates the exact model of ice axe that would cause such injuries, and sporting goods store owner Sol Appel surrenders the addresses of customers who bought them. After encountering a mountain climber from Appel's list who is in a wheelchair, Delaney is led to the high-rise building of Daniel Blank, who has been shown throughout cleaning up after the murders, and is at that moment attacking Albert Feinberg, who survives several blows but is hit by a passing car attempting to escape.

As Christmas approaches, Delaney has gathered enough evidence to prove Blank's guilt, but realizes the chances of arresting and convicting him are slim due to Blank's wealth and high social standing. Before confronting Blank in his luxury apartment, Delaney retrieves a Luger pistol from his closet, a souvenir he brought home after returning from military service in World War II.

Delaney finds Blank curled up in a closet in a deeply disturbed state. He confesses to his crimes, then composes himself enough to brag about how well-connected he is. Convinced he will get away with his crimes, he confidently calls the police to report Delaney for breaking and entering. Delaney shoots Blank in the head and returns to his office at the precinct. When the desk sergeant tells Delaney that Blank's body was discovered and asks if he wants to respond, Delaney informs him that he just retired. The final scene shows Delaney reading to Barbara in the hospital, holding her hand and crying as she dies.

== Cast ==
- Frank Sinatra as Sergeant Edward X. Delaney
- Faye Dunaway as Barbara Delaney
- James Whitmore as Dr. Sanford Ferguson
- David Dukes as Daniel Blank
- Brenda Vaccaro as Monica Gilbert
- Martin Gabel as Christopher Langley
- Anthony Zerbe as Captain Broughton
- George Coe as Dr. Vincent Bernardi
- Joe Spinell as Charles Lipsky
- Anna Navarro as Sunny Jordeen
- Jeffrey DeMunn as Sergeant Fernandez Correlli
- Robert Weil as Sol Appel
- Hugh Hurd as Ben Johnson
- Eddie Jones as Sergeant Curdy
- Victor Arnold as Officer Kendall
- Reuben Greene as Bill Garvin
- Jon DeVries as Calvin Sawtell (man in wheelchair)
- Richard Backus as Walt Ashman
- Frederick Rolf as Judge James Braggs
- Michael Ingram as Bernard Gilbert
- Bill Couch as Albert Feinberg
- Larry Loonin as Hardware Salesman
- Ramón Franco as Boy on Bus
- James Hayden as Young Policeman
- Bruce Willis as Man Entering Diner (uncredited)

== Production ==
=== Development ===
Columbia Pictures initially optioned Lawrence Sanders' novel, The First Deadly Sin, for a feature film adaptation in 1973, with Don Siegel originally attached to the project as director. Siegel was ultimately replaced by Roman Polanski, who was dropped by Columbia Pictures after statutory rape charges were brought against him shortly before filming was about to begin. Director Brian G. Hutton took over as director after Polanski fled to France. The First Deadly Sin was the third production by Sinatra's Artanis production company.

The film's ending was changed from the Lawrence Sanders novel in which the killer Daniel Blank retreated to a bluff called Devil's Needle in upstate New York where he died of dehydration before Delaney and the state troopers were able to bring him down. Here, a less subtle approach allowed the ending to be more in tune with the rest of the film.

=== Casting ===
The film marked Frank Sinatra's last starring role, as well as the first film appearance for Bruce Willis, as an extra walking past Edward Delaney (Sinatra) in a restaurant (although he is virtually unrecognizable in a hat that covers his eyes). Producer Elliot Kastner originally sought Marlon Brando for the lead role of Sergeant Edward X. Delaney.

=== Filming ===
Principal photography of The First Deadly Sin took place on location in New York City.

== Release ==
The First Deadly Sin premiered on October 23, 1980 at Loew's State Theatre in Times Square as part of a benefit for the Cabrini Medical Center, a key location in the film.

William L. DeAndrea noted that "for [the film's] network TV showing, Sinatra added a spoken voice-over" to the conclusion, "changing the meaning of the final images completely."

== Reception ==
=== Box office ===
The First Deadly Sin grossed $3.9 million in the United States and Canada.

=== Critical response ===
Critics Roger Ebert and Leonard Maltin both praised Sinatra's performance as one of his better performances, and daughter Nancy Sinatra commented in her book Sinatra: An American Legend that her father was very excited about this film.

The First Deadly Sin holds a 67% rating on Rotten Tomatoes based on nine reviews.

== Accolades ==
Award/association	Year	Category	Recipient(s) and nominee(s)	Result	Ref.
Edgar Awards	1981	Best Motion Picture		Nominated	
Golden Raspberry Awards	1981	Worst Actress	Faye Dunaway	Nominated	
Saturn Awards	1981	Best Supporting Actor	Martin Gabel	Nominated	
Stinkers Bad Movie Awards	1981	Worst Actress	Faye Dunaway	Nominated	

== Sources ==
- DeAndrea, William L. (1994). Encyclopedia Mysteriosa. New York City, New York: Prentice Hall. ISBN 978-0-028-61678-0.
- Donahue, Suzanne Mary (1987). American Film Distribution: The Changing Marketplace. Ann Arbor, Michigan: UMI Research Press. ISBN 978-0-835-71776-2.
