= We, the Normal =

1987 video by American video artist George Kuchar

- Release date: 1987
- Running time: 11 mins.

We, the Normal is a 1987 video by American video artist George Kuchar. We, the Normal records Kuchar's trip to Boulder, Colorado. In the video, Kuchar addresses humanity, nature, society.

== Overview ==
The video begins with a conversation about the heater's being turned off between George and his friend, Don, who is trying to take a nap. The video proceeds, as Kuchar lazes around the house, musing about his films and the "perfect hors d'oeuvre." George cuts between shots of what he is seeing, and shots of his face displaying his thoughts and discomfort with comedic effect.

At a Dinner party, George introduces his friend, Lorna, with apprehension. Kuchar claims that most people do not like Lorna. Later George confronts Jim, calling him Tim, who will be leading George and Don on a hike the next day. They are to leave in the late morning, and it will be quite cold up there.

On the hike, George inserts his musings on humanity and nature, as well as a slew of photographs. Throughout the hike, Kuchar records shots of the mountains up which they are hiking. As the three head further up into the mountains, George expresses a growing discomfort.

After the hike, George goes to Lorna's home. They talk about Lorna's daughter and her boyfriend, whom George refers to as a "little twerp."
