= He Fell into the Sky =

He Fell Into The Sky

Studio album by Tadpoles
- Released: 1994 and Remastered version 1997
- Recorded: 1993
- Genre: Psychedelic rock
- Length: 37:57
- Label: Bakery Records
- Producer: Mark Kramer

Tadpoles chronology
He Fell Into The Sky (1994)	Far Out (1996)

Professional ratings
Review scores
Source	Rating
Allmusic	3.0/5 stars

He Fell Into The Sky (1994) is the first full-length album released on CD by Tadpoles The album was the first CD album release on Bakery Records, the Tadpoles' label. The album was remastered and rereleased on both CD and cassette on Bakery Records in 1997 with the addition of credits and photographs for drummer, Michael Kite Audino, who performed on the album but left the group before it was released.

== Track listing ==
All songs written by Todd Parker and all drum tracks written by Michael Kite Audino except Mary Anne written by Glen Campbell.

1. "Blossom" – 2:57
2. "Snapper" – 3:46
3. "Liars" – 3:22
4. "Butterfly" – 3:14
5. "The Ride" – 4:24
6. "Iguana" – 3:32
7. "Umbrella Smile" – 3:20
8. "Trips and Visits" – 4:04
9. "Mary Anne" – 4:22
10. "Jamba" – 5:25

== Personnel ==
- Todd Parker - Vocals, Guitars, Synth
- Michael Kite Audino - Drums, Percussion
- Nick Kramer - Guitars
- David Max - Bass
- Andrew Jackson Shapiro - Guitars

=== Production ===
He Fell Into The Sky was produced and mixed by Mark Kramer(Shimmy Disc) and engineered by Steve Watson at Noise New Jersey Studio in 1993 over a two-day period. Album artwork and design was created by Ann Manca. Mastered by Dave Steele at dbs digital in Hoboken, NJ.
