= The Ballad of Genesis and Lady Jaye =

2011 film by Marie Losier

- Film poster
- Directed by: Marie Losier
- Produced by: Steve Holmgren; Marie Losier; Martin Marquet
- Starring: Genesis P-Orridge; Lady Jaye Breyer P-Orridge
- Cinematography: Marie Losier
- Edited by: Marie Losier
- Music by: Bryin Dall
- Release date: February 15, 2011 (Berlinale)
- Running time: 72 minutes
- Countries: United States; United Kingdom
- Language: English

The Ballad of Genesis and Lady Jaye is a documentary film, directed by Marie Losier and released in 2011. The film is a portrait of influential transgender musician and performance artist Genesis P-Orridge and their partner Lady Jaye Breyer P-Orridge (born Jacqueline Mary Breyer), focusing in particular on the Pandrogyny project of plastic surgery and body modification that they both undertook to become more similar to each other in appearance.

The film had its theatrical premiere in February 2011 at the 61st Berlin International Film Festival, where it won the Teddy Award for best LGBTQ-related documentary film.
