= Far Out (album) =

Studio album by Tadpoles
- Released: 1996
- Recorded: 1994–1995
- Genre: Psychedelic rock
- Length: 42:04
- Label: Bakery Records
- Producer: Mark Kramer

Tadpoles chronology
He Fell Into The Sky (1994)	Far Out (1996)	Know Your Ghosts E.P. (1997)

Professional ratings
Review scores
Source	Rating
Allmusic	4.0/5 stars
Rolling Stone	4.0/5 stars

Far Out (1996) is the second full-length album released on CD by Tadpoles. The album was recorded by the core trio of Todd Parker, David Max and Nick Kramer after drummer, Michael Kite Audino and guitarist Andrew Jackson Shapiro left the group. Guest musicians Edward Odowd (The Toilet Boys / Psychic TV) and Steve Savoca (The Werefrogs) perform drums and percussion on the album. Additional lap steel guitar was provided by Jeff Passifiume (Hank McCoy and The Dead Ringers / The Lost Continentals). "Ride The World Around The Sun" is a rerecording of the song, "Sunshine" from the Tadpoles' Superwhip cassette-only album from 1992. "Old Dirty Mushrooms" was included as a bonus track on the CD version of the album and was not included on the cassette version. "Old Dirty Mushrooms" was recorded in 1991 and features just Todd Parker and drummer, Michael Kite Audino, along with sax by Raj Seshu. Far Out is notable in that it received a 4-star review from Rolling Stone, a rare feat at the time for an independently released CD.

== Track listing ==
1. "Race You To The Mustard Patch" (Parker/Max) – 4:35
2. "At Least I'm Not Like Jonathan Carver" (Kramer/Max/Parker) – 5:46
3. "Nazareth" (Parker) – 5:34
4. "Ride The World Around The Sun" (Parker) – 3:19
5. "4D" (Kramer) – 7:07
6. "Feel Like A Freak (Parker/Max)" – 4:45
7. "Chunky" (Parker) – 4:06
8. "Clea" (Kramer) – 5:48
9. "Old Dirty Mushrooms" (Parker) – 2:46

== Personnel ==
- Todd Parker - Vocals on 1, 2, 4, 6, 7 and 9 and Guitars, 6-string Bass
- Nick Kramer - Vocals on 3, 6 and 8 and Guitars
- David Max - Bass

With Guests

- Jeff Passifiume - Lap Steel Guitar on 2, 3 and additional guitar on 4
- Steve Savoca - Drums, Percussion on 2, 3, 4 5, 6, 7 and backing vocal on 6
- Edward Odowd - Drums, Percussion on 1 and 8
- Michael Kite Audino - Drums, Percussion and backing vocal on 9
- Raj Seshu - Sax on 9

=== Production ===
Far Out was produced and mixed by Mark Kramer (Shimmy Disc) and engineered by Steve Watson at Noise New Jersey Studio in 1994-1995 with additional recording at Waterfront Studio in Hoboken, NJ. Album artwork and design was created by Ann Manca. Mastered by Dave Steele at dbs digital in Hoboken, NJ.
