= Know Your Ghosts E.P. =

EP by Tadpoles
- Released: 1997
- Recorded: 1992–1997
- Genre: Psychedelic rock
- Length: 14:49
- Label: Bakery Records
- Producer: Tadpoles

Tadpoles chronology
Far Out (1996)	Know Your Ghosts E.P. (1997)	Destroy Terrastock - Live (1998)

Professional ratings
Review scores
Source	Rating
Allmusic	3/5 stars

Know Your Ghosts E.P. (1997) is a 4-song E.P. released on CD by Tadpoles. Upon original release, Bakery Records included a VHS copy of Tadpoles' music video for the song "Snapper" with all mail-orders. The video version of the song "Snapper" was included on the E.P. and was recorded in 1991 by Todd Parker and drummer, Michael Kite Audino. "Judas, This Is Jesus" is a remake of the Tadpoles' track originally released on the 1989 cassette-only album, Beautiful Music For Ugly Children and was recorded and produced by Mark Kramer (Shimmy Disc) at Noise New Jersey studio. "Know Your Ghosts" is the same recording that appears on the Smoke Ghost album. Tadpoles covered the Tony Mentzer song "Oops, I Lost Your MInd" previously on 1990's cassette-only album William's Doll (album). Tadpoles remade the tune again here with Tony Mentzer himself on lead vocals and The Waitresses' Chris Butler guest-drumming.

== Track listing ==
1. "Know Your Ghosts" (Kramer/Max) – 4:22
2. "Judas, This Is Jesus" (Parker) – 3:05
3. "Snapper (video version)" (Parker) – 3:21
4. "Oops, I Lost Your Mind" (Mentzer) – 4:01

== Personnel ==
- Todd Parker - Vocals on 3 and Guitars
- Nick Kramer - Vocals on 1 and Guitars
- David Max - Bass
- Adam Boyette - Drums and Percussion on 1, 2

with Guests

- Michael Kite Audino - Drums and Percussion on 3
- John Ian Davis - Vocal sample on 2
- Chris Butler - Drums and Percussion on 4
- Tony Mentzer - Guitar and Vocals on 4

=== Production ===
Know Your Ghosts E.P. is a compilation of recordings made between 1991 and 1997. Album artwork and design was created by Ann Manca. The cover painting is by Tadpoles' drummer, Adam Boyette. Mastered by Todd Parker at dbs digital in Hoboken, NJ.
