= Smoke Ghost =

Studio album by Tadpoles
- Released: 1998
- Recorded: 1997
- Genre: Psychedelic rock
- Length: 52:11
- Label: Bakery Records
- Producer: Mark Kramer

Tadpoles chronology
Destroy Terrastock - Live (1998)	Smoke Ghost (1998)	Whirlaway (1999)

Professional ratings
Review scores
Source	Rating
Allmusic	4.5/5 stars

Smoke Ghost (1998) is the third full-length studio album released on CD by Tadpoles and is the first album with Tadpoles' new drummer, Adam Boyette. Upon original release, Bakery Records included a copy of Tadpoles Destroy Terrastock - Live with all mail-orders. The song "Breaking" is a re-recording of the original version which appeared on the group's 1992 cassette-only album, Superwhip. "Know Your Ghosts" is identical to the version which was released on the 1997 Know Your Ghosts E.P.

== Track listing ==
1. "When I Feel" (Kramer) – 5:28
2. "Snow Down" (Parker) – 5:57
3. "Breaking" (Parker) – 3:07
4. "Happy Feet" (Kramer) – 5:21
5. "Jaded Jean" (Parker/Max)) – 3:50
6. "Rainbowmaker (Kramer)" – 4:45
7. "Know Your Ghosts" (Kramer/Max) – 4:20
8. "Sense" (Parker) – 4:08
9. "Firecracker" (Kramer) – 4:44
10. "Percolate" (Parker) – 9:31

== Personnel ==
- Todd Parker - Vocals on 2,3,5,8,10 and Guitars, Emulator
- Nick Kramer - Vocals on 1,4,6,7,9 and Guitars
- David Max - Bass
- Adam Boyette - Drums and Percussion

=== Production ===
Smoke Ghost was produced, engineered and mixed by Mark Kramer (Shimmy Disc) at Noise New Jersey Studio in 1997. Additional engineering by Steve Watson. Album artwork and design was created by Ann Manca. Mastered by Todd Parker at dbs digital in Hoboken, NJ.
