= Mike Kuchar =

American underground filmmaker, actor and artist

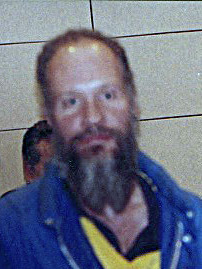
Mike Kuchar in 1995

Mike Kuchar (born August 31, 1942, in New York City) is an American underground filmmaker, actor, and artist. Kuchar is notable for his low-budget and camp films such as Sins of the Fleshapoids and The Craven Sluck.

== Biography ==
Raised in The Bronx, he made his first films as a teenager in the 1950s with his twin brother George Kuchar and participated in New York's underground film scene in the 1960s and 1970s. He divided his time between New York City and his brother's San Francisco apartment until 2007, when he moved to San Francisco permanently; George died in 2011.

During the 1980s and 1990s, Mike Kuchar created comics and illustrations for homoerotic publications including Meatmen, Gay Heart Throbs, First Hand, and Manscape, and continued to draw commissions afterward.

It Came From Kuchar, a documentary film about George and Mike Kuchar by Jennifer Kroot, premiered at the South by Southwest film festival on 14 March 2009.

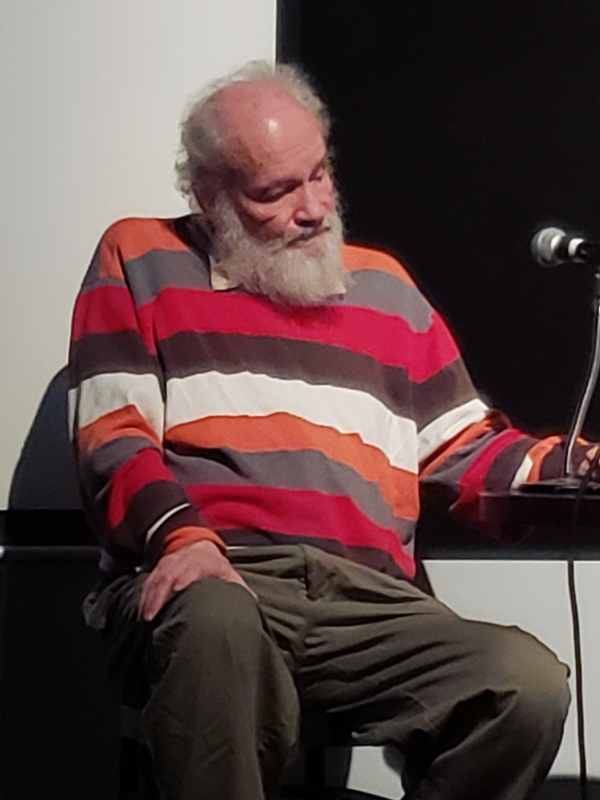
Kuchar presenting a set of short films in 2018

In more recent years, Kuchar has focused on more intimate one person expressionistic films. At the Vienna International Film Festival in 2009, he unveiled two short films, Swan Song and Dumped. Swan Song features the pain of a young man tormented by his sensuality who is painted as an animal writhing in pain, and Dumped stars veteran stage actress Deirdre McGill in a portrait of a woman engaged in a deadly love triangle. Kuchar teaches in the film program at the San Francisco Art Institute.

Kuchar also worked as a cameraman for Rosa von Praunheim.

The Kuchar brothers collaborated on a book, Reflections from a Cinematic Cesspool (1997), a humorous memoir discussing four decades of filmmaking, with an introduction by director John Waters.

== Partial filmography ==
- The Pervert (1963)
- Born of the Wind (1964)
- Sins of the Fleshapoids (1965)
- Green Desire (1966)
- The Secret of Wendel Samson (1966)
- Fragments (1967)
- The Craven Sluck (formerly titled Madonna) (1967)
- Variations (1968)
- Cycles (1968)
- Tales of the Bronx (1969)
- Chronicles (1969)
- Abode of the Snow (1970)
- Aqua Circus (1971)
- Didgeridoo (1972)
- Faraway Places (1972)
- Death Quest of the Ju-Ju Cults (1976)
- Dwarf Star (1977)
- Fable for a New Age (1984)
- Tone Poem (1984)
- Seascape (1984)
- Dumped ( 2009)
- Swan Song (2009)
- Midnight Suite (2011)
- Litany of the Seven Kisses (2011)
- Tickled Pink (2012)
- Fallen Angels (2013)

Produced at the San Francisco Art Institute:

- The Masque of Valhalla (1972)
- The Wings of Muru (1973)
- Blood Sucker (1975)
- The Passions: A Psycho-Drama (1977)
- Isle of the Sleeping Souls (1979)
- Circe (1984)
- Midnight Carnival (2011)

Produced at the Collective For Living Cinema's Dramatic Narrative Class:

- Scream of the Damned (1987)

== Films featuring Mike Kuchar ==
- Portrait George and Mike Kuchar (1977) by Rosa von Praunheim
- Bird, Bath and Beyond (2003) by Marie Losier
- My Morning with Magic Mike (2024) by John Wilson

== Bibliography ==
- Jack Stevenson, Desperate Visions 1: The Films of John Waters and George & Mike Kuchar (UK: Creation Books, 1996) ISBN 1-871592-34-8
- George and Mike Kuchar, Reflections from a Cinematic Cesspool (Berkeley CA: Zanja Pr Dangerous Concepts, 1997) ISBN 0-915906-34-1
