= George Kuchar =

American underground film director and video artist

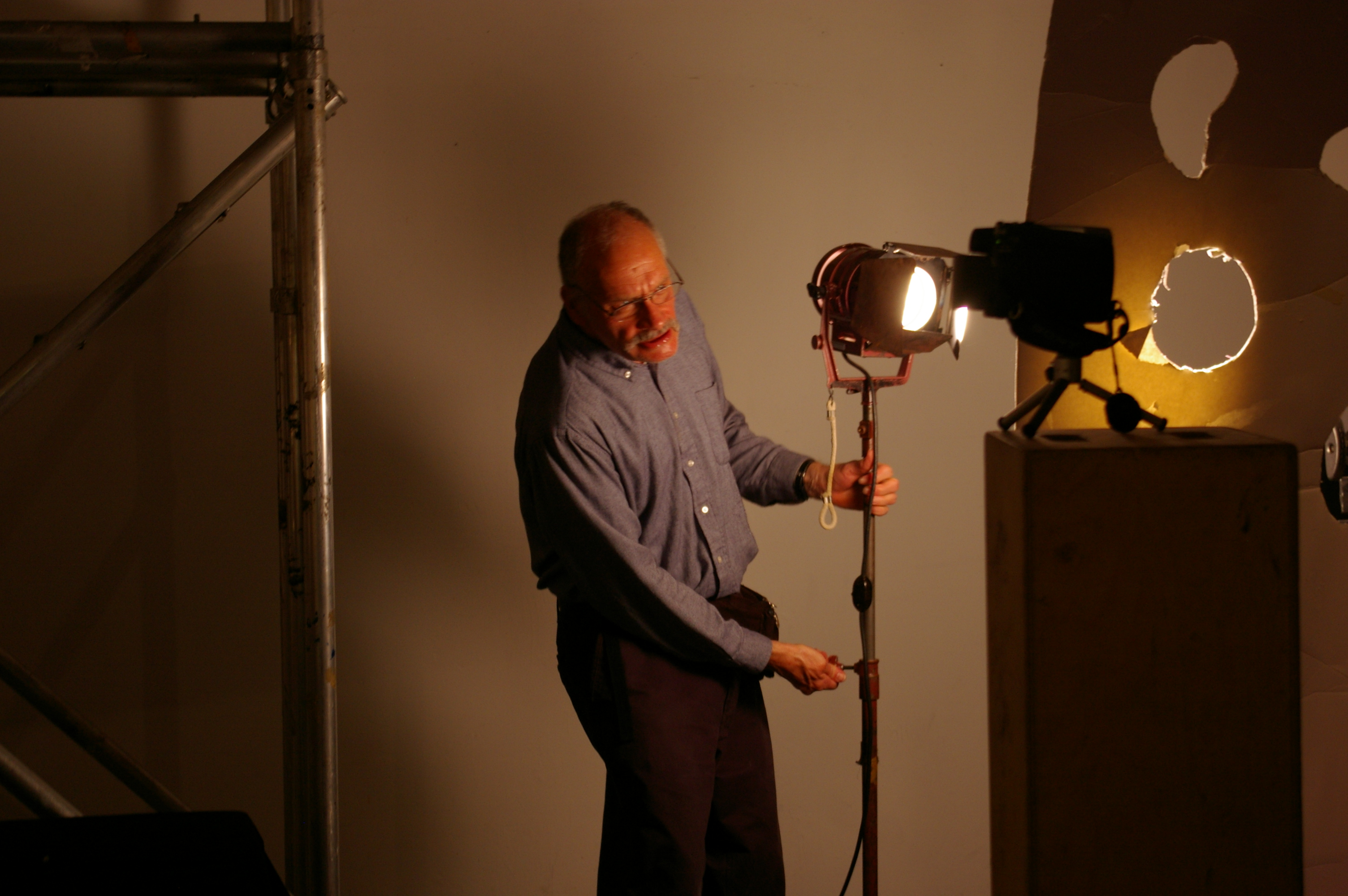
- George Kuchar on the set of Orphans of the Cosmos (2008)
- Born: August 31, 1942; New York, New York, U.S.
- Died: September 6, 2011 (aged 69); San Francisco, California, U.S.
- Occupations: Director, artist, teacher

George Kuchar (August 31, 1942 – September 6, 2011) was an American underground film director and video artist, known for his "low-fi" aesthetic.

== Early life and career ==
Kuchar trained as a commercial artist at the School of Industrial Art, now known as the High School of Art and Design, a vocational school in New York City. He graduated in 1960 and drew weather maps for a local news show. During this period, he and his twin brother Mike Kuchar were making 8mm movies, which were showcased in the then-burgeoning underground film scene alongside films by Andy Warhol, Kenneth Anger, and Stan Brakhage. Ken Jacobs brought attention of their work to Jonas Mekas, who championed their work in the Village Voice and elsewhere.

After being laid off from a commercial art job in New York City, Kuchar was offered a teaching job in the film department of the San Francisco Art Institute, where he taught from 1971 until early 2011.

In San Francisco, Kuchar became involved with underground comics via his neighbors Art Spiegelman and Bill Griffith. They both wound up in his movies and George wound up in their publications.

== Films ==
George Kuchar directed over 200 films and videos (including over 15 with his twin brother Mike), many of them short films by students in his courses at the San Francisco Art Institute. In the Critics' Poll of the 100 best films of the 20th century, appearing originally in The Village Voice (4 January 2000), Hold Me While I'm Naked was ranked 52nd.

In 2011, I, An Actress, a 1977 film featuring a screen test of student actress Barbera Lapsley, was selected for preservation in the National Film Registry by the Library of Congress.

His film work influenced the No Wave Cinema movement during the late 70s-early 80s.

== Video diaries ==
After leaving New York City for San Francisco, Kuchar prolifically produced video diaries, the true quantity of which remains unknown. Varying in duration from five to ninety minutes, Kuchar's video diaries inflect his everyday life with familiar themes of Kuchar's oeuvre such as appetite, voluptuousness, the hilarity of bathos, campy appropriation, flatulence, the weather, urination, friendship, love, and the artificiality of cinema itself. The most well known of Kuchar's video diaries are his Weather Diary Series that chronicle Kuchar's annual pilgrimages to El Reno, Oklahoma, to observe tornadoes. In response to changes in media technology, Kuchar's video diaries increasingly applied the tactics of camp appropriation to the stuff of the digital age. Kuchar's later video diaries made use of consumer grade digital effects to generate something like postmodern psychedelia. His entire output of video work is archived at the Video Data Bank. Electronic Arts Intermix has a selection of titles.

Kuchar's video work has clearly influenced the contemporary queer performance/video artists Ryan Trecartin and Felix Bernstein.

== Painting ==
Kuchar's paintings often reflect the same themes as his film and video works while also sharing their fauvist-like color scheme. According to Eileen Myles, Kuchar was used to working in boxes and found that painting and video didn't feel all that different. Kuchar's paintings were exhibited intermittently throughout his career, most recently at the Casey Kaplan Gallery in Manhattan and in 2012 at MoMA PS1 as a part of Kuchar's posthumous retrospective: Pagan Rhapsodies.

Portrait George and Mike Kuchar (1977) by Rosa von Praunheim.

It Came from Kuchar, a documentary film of the life of George and Mike Kuchar by Jennifer Kroot, premiered at the South by Southwest film festival on 14 March 2009.

In 1997, the Kuchar brothers collaborated on a book Reflections from a Cinematic Cesspool, a memoir discussing four decades of filmmaking with an introduction by director John Waters.

== Death ==
George Kuchar died on 6 September 2011 in San Francisco, just past his 69th birthday on August 31, of complications related to prostate cancer. He was remembered by The New York Times as "a filmmaker whose campy yet ardent low-budget movies inspired underground directors like John Waters and David Lynch in the 1960s, and helped kindle the do-it-yourself moviemaking aesthetic now ubiquitous on YouTube."

== Filmography ==
- The Wet Destruction of the Atlantic Empire (1954)
- Screwball (1957)
- The Naked and the Nude (1957)
- The Slasher (1958)
- The Thief and the Stripper (1959)
- A Tub Named Desire (1960)
- I Was a Teenage Rumpot (1960)
- Pussy on a Hot Tin Roof (1961)
- Born of the Wind (1961)
- A Woman Distressed (1962)
- A Town Called Tempest (1962)
- Night of the Bomb (1962)
- Lust for Ectsasy (1963)
- The Confessions of Babette (1963)
- Tootsies in Autumn (1963)
- Anita Needs Me (1963)
- The Lovers of Eternity (1963)
- Corruption of the Damned (1965)
- Hold Me While I'm Naked (1966)
- Leisure (1966)
- Mosholu Holiday (1966)
- Color Me Shameless (1967)
- Eclipse of the Sun Virgin (1967)
- The Lady from Sands Point (1967)
- Knocturne (1968)
- Unstrap Me (1968)
- House of the White People (1968)
- Encyclopedia of the Blessed (1968)
- The Mammal Palace (1969)
- Pagan Rhapsody (1970)
- Portrait of Ramona (1971)
- The Sunshine Sisters (1972)
- The Devil's Cleavage (1973)
- Thundercrack! (1975) (screenplay)
- Back To Nature (1976)
- A Reason to Live (1976)
- La Casa De Chorizo (1977)
- KY Kapers (1977)
- Wild Night in El Reno (1977)
- Forever and Always (1978)
- Mongreloid (1978)
- Blips (1979)
- Aqueerius (1980)
- The Nocturnal Immaculation (1980)
- Yolando (1980)
- Cattle Mutilations (1983)
- Mom (1983)
- Untitled Musical (1984)
- The X-People (1984)
- Ascension of the Demonoids (1985)

Produced at the San Francisco Art Institute:

- Destination Damnation (1972)
- Carnal Bipeds (1973)
- I Married a Heathen (1974)
- The Desperate and the Deep (1975)
- I, an Actress (1977)
- The Asphalt Ribbon (1977)
- One Night a Week (1978)
- Prescrition [sic] in Blue (1978)
- The Power of the Press (1979)
- Remember Tomorrow (1979)
- Symphony for a Sinner (1979)
- How to Chose [sic] a Wife (1980)
- The Woman and the Dress (1980)
- Ochokpug (1980)
- Boulevard Kishka (1981)
- The Oneers (1982)
- Ms. Hyde (1983)
- Club Vatican (1984)
- The Legend of Thelma White (1985)
- Motel Capri (1986)
- La Noche D'Amour (1986)
- PRC Musical (1986)
- Insanitorium (1987)
- Summer of No Return (1988)
- La Verbotene Voyage (1989)
- A Fatal Desire (2004)
- The Crypt of Frankenstein (2008)
- Orphans of the Cosmos (2008)
- Zombies of Zanzibar (2010)
- Lingo of the Lost (2010)

== Videography ==
- Studio 8 (1985)
- Video Album (1985)
- Weather Diary 1 (1986)
- Greetings from Boulder (1986)
- Video Album 2 (1986)
- Last Hello (1986)
- Video Album 3 (1986)
- Rainy Season (1987)
- Weather Diary 2 (1987)
- Caged Culture (1987)
- Creeping Crimson (1987)
- Cult of the Cubicles (1987)
- Muffled Darkness (1987)
- Video Album 5: The Thursday People (1987)
- We, the Normal (1987)
- Xmas 1987 New Years (1987)
- Calling Dr. Petrov (1987)
- East By Southwest (1987)
- The Desert Within (1987)
- 1980 Seven (1987)
- Weather Diary 3 (1988)
- Weather Diary 4 (1988)
- The Celluloids (1988)
- L.A. Screening Workshop (1988)
- Low Light Life (1988)
- Mecca of the Frigid (1988)
- Precious Products (1988)
- Return to the House of Pain (1988)
- Evangelust (1988)
- The Hurt that Fades (1988)
- Motivation of the Carcasoids (1988)
- Terror By Twilight (1988)
- Orbits of Fear (1988)
- Fill Thy Crack with Whiteness (1989)
- Migration of the Blubberoids (1989)
- Precious Products (1989)
- Weather Diary 5 (1989)
- The Deafening Goo (1989)
- Love Me True (1989)
- Hefner's Heifers (1989)
- Say Yes to No (1989)
- 500 Millibars to Ecstasy (1989)
- Chili Line Stops Here (1989)
- The Plucking of the Succulents (1989)
- Point 'n Shoot (1989)
- Pictures at an Exhibitionist's (1989)
- Vile Cargo (1989)
- The Web of Dr. Satan (1989)
- Wet Dreams (1989)
- Secrets of the Shadow World (1988-1989)
- Letter from New York (1990)
- Weather Diary 6 (1990)
- Kiss of the Veggie Vixen (1990)
- Rocky Interlude (1990)
- Edible Atrocities (1990)
- Snap 'n Snatch (1990)
- Curse of the Kurva (1990)
- Munchkins of the Melody Manor (1990)
- Passage to Wetness (1990)
- Saga of Magda (1990)
- Tempest in a Tea Room (1990)
- The Warming of the Hell House (1990)
- Winter Hostilities (1991)
- Gastronomic Getaway (1991)
- Snake Goddess (1991)
- Foto Spread (1991)
- The Fall of the House of Yasmin (1991)
- Artists in Residence (1991)
- Scarlet Droppings (1991)
- Weather Watch (1991)
- Indian Summer (1991)
- Come Forth, Julyowa (1991)
- The Holiday Xmas Video of 1991 (1991)
- The Redhead from Riverside Terrace (1991)
- Going Nowhere (1992)
- Interior Vacuum (1992)
- Sherman Acres (1992)
- George Kuchar Goes to Work with Today's Youth (1992)
- Big Ones Hurt (1992)
- Pilgrimage (1992)
- Chat 'n 'Chew (1992)
- Demonatrix of Kebrine Castle (1992)
- Impaction of the Igneous (1992)
- Indigo Blues (1992)
- Award (1992)
- Ann Arbor (1992)
- The Shame of Lela La Suere (1992)
- Video Wallpaper Series (1992)
- Graffiti Junction (1993)
- The Tower of the Astro-Cyclops (1994)
- Andy's House of Gary (1993)
- ID Came from Inner Space (1993)
- Dial A Kvetch (1993)
- Bayou of the Blue Behemoth (1993)
- Glacier Park Video Views (1993)
- Melody for Maria (1993)
- Story of Ruthy (1993)
- Sunbelt Serenade, Part 1: Oklahoma (1993)
- Sunbelt Serenade, Part 2: Los Angeles (1993)
- Isleton (1992)
- Trinity (1993)
- Kitchenetiquette (1993)
- The Tower of the Astro-Cyclops (1994)
- Sunbelt Serenade, Part 3: Arizona (1994)
- The Gifted Goon (1994)
- Going Hollywood (1994)
- Cellar Sinema (1994)
- Dingleberry Jingles (1994)
- Jungle Jezebel (1994)
- Sins of Bunny Luv (1994)
- Baldies of Burgermeister Bungalow (1994)
- The Cage of Nicholas (1994)
- Chow Down on Cheney Street (1994)
- Felines of Castle Frauline (1994)
- Rancho Roulette (1994)
- Holidaze, 1994 (1994)
- Route 666 (1994)
- Tales of the Twilight Typist (1994)
- Urchins of Ungawa (1994)
- Nirvana of the Nebbishites (1994)
- Woman of the 90's (1995)
- Portraiture in Black (1995)
- The Confessions of Nina Noir (1995)
- Society Slut (1995)
- The Unclean (1995)
- Slippage in the Garden of Udon (1995)
- Omewenne (1995)
- Cocktail Crooners (1997)
- Curmudgeon on the Campus (1997)
- Oasis of the Pharaohs (1997)
- The Exiled Files of Eddie Gray (1997)
- The Inmate (1997)
- Chigger Country (1999)
- Culinary Linkage (1999)
- Trilogy of the Titans (1999)

== Bibliography ==
- George and Mike Kuchar, Reflections from a Cinematic Cesspool (Berkeley CA: Zanja Pr Dangerous Concepts, 1997) ISBN 0-915906-34-1
