= Lady Jaye P-Orridge =

British artist, musician, nurse (1969–2007)

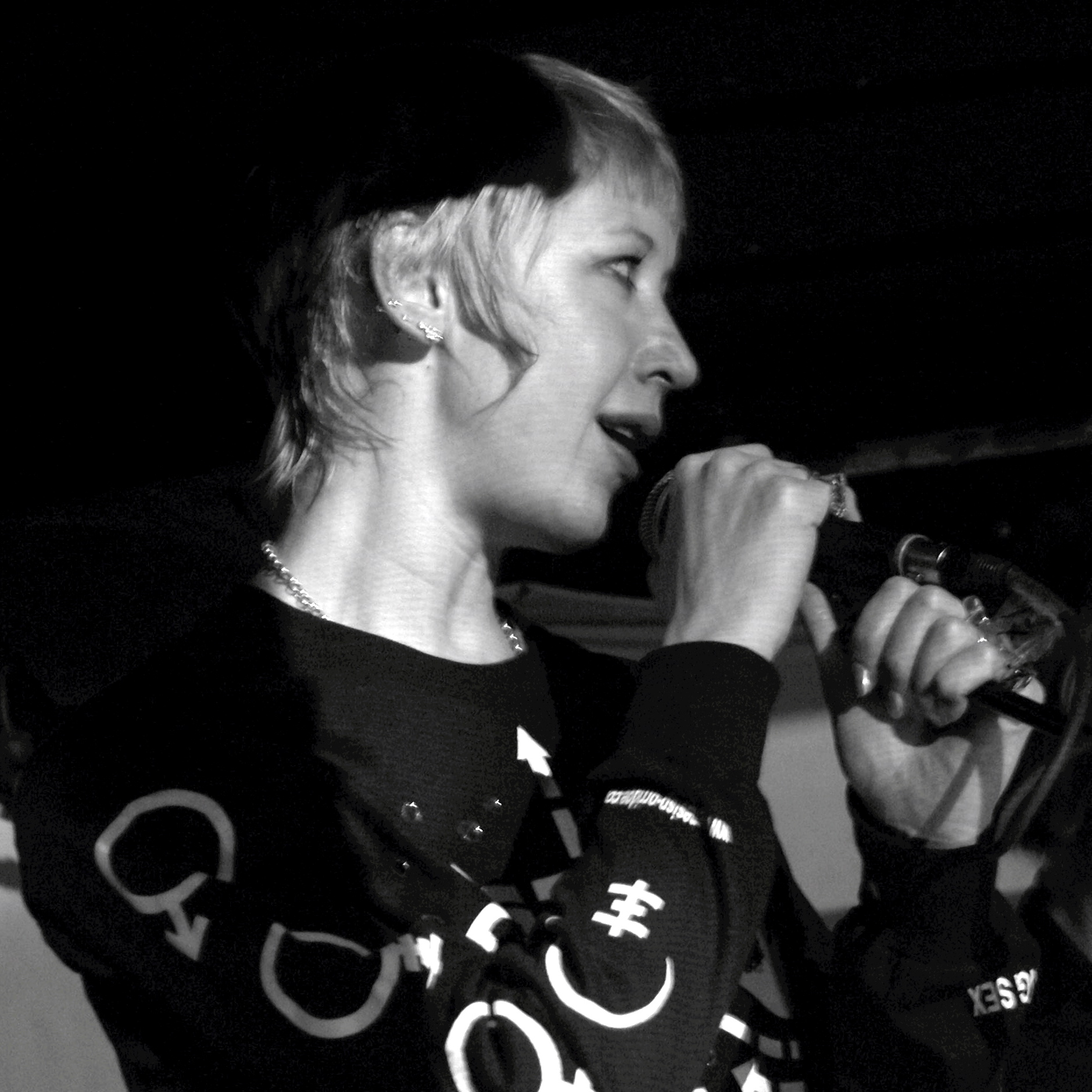
Lady Jaye Breyer P-Orridge

Lady Jaye Breyer P-Orridge (née Jacqueline Mary Breyer; 1969–2007) was an artist, musician and nurse born in 1969. She married Genesis P-Orridge in 1993. Together they embarked on a project of "pandrogyny," taking on medical procedures to look more like each other, to create a third being to transcend their individual identities and become one "pandrogynous" whole. They often wore matching outfits and on Valentine's Day 2003 they received matching breast implants. Breyer died in 2007 at age 38 of stomach cancer.
