= Wolfen =

Wolfen may refer to:

== Places ==
- Wolfen, Germany, town in Saxony-Anhalt

== Fiction ==
- The Wolfen, 1978 horror novel by Whitley Strieber
- Wolfen (film), 1981 horror film

== Gaming ==
- An enemy in Kya: Dark Lineage
- Wolfen, the ships used by the Star Wolf team in the Star Fox series
- A species of wolf-like humanoids in Rackham's Cadwallon role-playing game and Confrontation miniatures game

== Other uses ==
- ORWO, (Original Wolfen), a brand of photographic films
