= Leon and Malia =

Musical duo from Hawai'i

Leon and Malia, stylised as Leon & Malia, is a musical duo from Hawai'i, formed by Leon Siu (born 14 May 1948) and Malia Elliott (born 19 December 1948). Their collaboration since the 1970s has promoted Hawaiian culture through their fusion of Hawaiian and contemporary music styles.

== Career ==
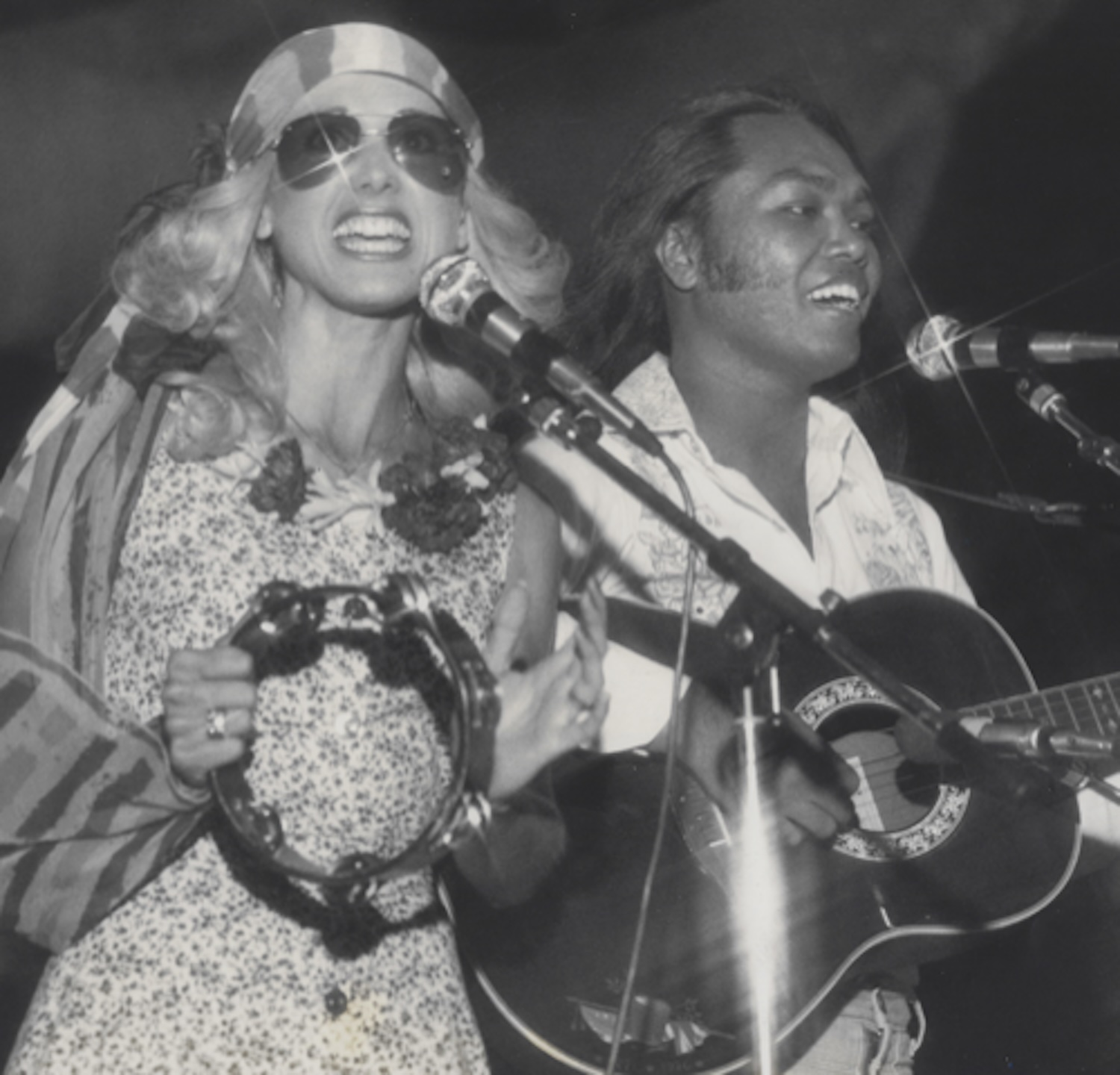
Leon and Malia performing at the Honolulu International Center Arena in 1976

The duo got their start in the 1970s, performing at Honolulu nightclubs and local concerts. During this decade, they recorded four albums showcasing their blend of Hawaiian, folk, and pop music stylings.

In 1975, Leon & Malia became involved with Hōkūle'a—the double-hulled canoe that sailed round-trip between Hawai'i and Tahiti, navigating by the stars. In 1976, Leon & Malia were chosen to write the soundtrack for the National Geographic Society 90-minute documentary film, "The Voyage of the Hōkūle'a," produced by Dale Bell for broadcast on national PBS television (1977). They collaborated with William Loose on the music score based on the song "Hōkūle'a” that Leon & Malia wrote for the maiden voyage. Forty years later, in 2017, Leon & Malia performed "Hōkūle'a" and a medley of Hōkūle'a songs for the homecoming celebration of Hōkūle'a to Hawai'i from a three-year circumnavigation of the world.

Their promotion of Hawaiian culture also led to collaboration with composer Jerre Tanner on a symphonic work, "Boy with Goldfish." It told the story of a mythical ancient Hawaiian hero's journey, inspired by a series of paintings by artist John Paul Thomas. Leon & Malia wrote the melodies and lyrics and performed as vocal soloists. The premier performance by the Honolulu Symphony Orchestra (now the Hawai'i Symphony Orchestra) was on October 4, 1976. From 1975 to 1977, Leon & Malia performed excerpts of "Boy with Goldfish" in over forty community and youth concerts. In July 1979, Leon & Malia recorded "Boy with Goldfish" with the London Symphony Orchestra and the Nigel Brooks Chorale, Lee Holdridge conducting, in Watford, England. The music was recorded digitally with the newly developed Soundstream recording and editing technology. It was released in 1980 by Varèse Sarabande on vinyl disc.

Teaching children about Hawaiian culture has been another pursuit with Leon & Malia. Their initial project, "Mokulana", was released in 1979 as a storybook-album and television special on KHON-TV. Since then, they have performed and recorded numerous projects for schools and children, including "Keiki Calabash," "Hawai'i Kids Calabash," and "Calabash Corner," a television program that aired weekly on KHET Hawai'i Public Television. In 2006, their album "Hawaii' Kids Praise" was nominated for a Na Hoku Hanohano music award.

In 2026, the Hawaii Academy of Recording Artists announced that Leon & Malia will be recipients of the Academy's Lifetime Achievement Award.

== Discography ==
- Leon and Malia (1970), Quadrum QS-2004
- Blend (1972), Trim Records TLP 1972
- Haku Mele (1976), Laka Records LAKA LM 003
- Heartland (1979), Laka Records LM 004
- Mokulana (1979), Banyan Records BR 700
- Boy with Goldfish (1980), vinyl disc (digital master), Varèse Sarabande VCDM 1000.30
  - (1994) compact disc, Albany Records CD-TROY0053
  - (2006) hybrid disc, Albany Records SACD-TROY0053
- Ho'olako Hawai'i (1987), cassette Children's Media Hawai'i CS-001
- Tropic Nights (1991), cassette Haku Mele 005
- Keiki Calabash (1993), Cassette Island Heritage 003
  - (1993), CD Island Heritage 006
  - (1993), VHS Island Heritage 00
  - (2002), CD Island Heritage 008
  - (2004), DVD Island Heritage 009
- Slack Key Praise (1997), CD Haku Mele Hawai'i 010
- Lullaby Moon (1999), CD Haku Mele Hawai'i 011
- Hawaiian Melodies (2002), Haku Mele Hawai'i 012
- Lullaby Moon (2003), CD Island Heritage 022
- Hawaii' Kids Praise (2005), CD Haku Mele Hawai'i 014
- Boat Days-Tropic Nights (2006), CD Island Heritage 023
- Hawai'i Kids Calabash (2007)
  - (2007), CD Island Heritage 024
  - (2007), DVD Island Heritage 025
  - (2011), CD Leon & Malia Productions 014 (2011), DVD Leon & Malia Productions 015
- Hawai'i Kids' Christmas (2018), CD Haku Mele Productions 019
- Island Music (2020), Island Music, Savant Records SR 48
- Heartland (2024), Leon & Malia Productions LM 004z
