= Woodstock (film) =

1970 documentary film by Michael Wadleigh

- Theatrical release poster by Richard Amsel
- Directed by: Michael Wadleigh
- Produced by: Bob Maurice; Dale Bell
- Starring: Janis Joplin; Canned Heat; Joan Baez; Joe Cocker; Country Joe & The Fish; Crosby, Stills & Nash; Arlo Guthrie; Richie Havens; Jimi Hendrix; Santana; John Sebastian; Sha-Na-Na; Sly & The Family Stone; Ten Years After; The Who; 400,000 Other Beautiful People
- Edited by: Michael Wadleigh; Martin Scorsese; Stan Warnow; Yeu-Bun Yee; Jere Huggins; Thelma Schoonmaker
- Production companies: Wadleigh-Maurice, Ltd.
- Distributed by: Warner Bros.
- Release date: March 26, 1970
- Running time: 185 minutes (1970) 224 minutes (1994)
- Country: United States
- Language: English
- Budget: $600,000
- Box office: $50 million ($415 million in 2025 dollars)

Woodstock is a 1970 American documentary concert film of the watershed counterculture Woodstock Festival which took place in August 1969 near Bethel, New York.

The film was directed by Michael Wadleigh in his directorial debut. Seven editors are credited, including Thelma Schoonmaker, Martin Scorsese, and Wadleigh. Woodstock was a great commercial and critical success. It received the Academy Award for Best Documentary Feature. Schoonmaker was nominated for the Academy Award for Best Film Editing, a rare distinction for a documentary. Dan Wallin and L. A. Johnson were nominated for the Academy Award for Best Sound. The film was screened at the 1970 Cannes Film Festival, but was not entered into the main competition.

The 1970 theatrical release of the film ran 185 minutes. A director's cut spanning 224 minutes was released in 1994. Both cuts take liberties with the timeline of the festival. However, the opening and closing acts are the same in the film as they appeared on stage; Richie Havens opens the show and Jimi Hendrix closes it.

In 1996, the film was selected for preservation in the United States National Film Registry by the Library of Congress as being "culturally, historically, or aesthetically significant".

An expanded 40th Anniversary Edition of Woodstock, released on June 9, 2009, in Blu-ray and DVD formats, features additional performances not before seen in the film, and it includes lengthened versions of existing performances, such as Creedence Clearwater Revival.

== Artists ==
=== Artists by appearance ===
No.	Group / Singers	Title
1.	Crosby, Stills & Nash	"Long Time Gone" *
2.	Canned Heat	"Going Up the Country" *
3.	Crosby, Stills & Nash	"Wooden Ships" *
4.	Richie Havens	"Handsome Johnny"
5.	Richie Havens	"Freedom" / "Sometimes I Feel Like a Motherless Child"
6.	Canned Heat	"A Change Is Gonna Come" **
7.	Joan Baez	"Joe Hill"
8.	Joan Baez	"Swing Low Sweet Chariot"
9.	The Who	"We're Not Gonna Take It" / "See Me, Feel Me"
10.	The Who	"Summertime Blues"
11.	Sha-Na-Na	"At the Hop"
12.	Joe Cocker and the Grease Band	"With a Little Help from My Friends"
13.	Audience	"Crowd Rain Chant"
14.	Country Joe and the Fish	"Rock and Soul Music"
15.	Arlo Guthrie	"Coming Into Los Angeles"
16.	Crosby, Stills & Nash	"Suite: Judy Blue Eyes"
17.	Ten Years After	"I'm Going Home"
18.	Jefferson Airplane	"Saturday Afternoon" / "Won't You Try" **
19.	Jefferson Airplane	"Uncle Sam's Blues" **
20.	John Sebastian	"Younger Generation"
21.	Country Joe McDonald	"FISH Cheer / Feel-Like-I'm-Fixing-to-Die-Rag"
22.	Santana	"Soul Sacrifice"
23.	Sly and the Family Stone	"I Want to Take You Higher"/ "Music Lover" (the "Higher" chant)
24.	Janis Joplin	"Work Me, Lord" **
25.	Jimi Hendrix	"Voodoo Child (Slight Return)" (named "Voodoo Chile" in the film) **
26.	Jimi Hendrix	"The Star-Spangled Banner"
27.	Jimi Hendrix	"Purple Haze"
28.	Jimi Hendrix	"Woodstock Improvisation" **
29.	Jimi Hendrix	"Villanova Junction"
30.	Crosby, Stills, Nash & Young	"Woodstock"* / "Find the Cost of Freedom" **

* studio recording from an album by the artist
** director's cut only

=== Artists omitted ===
- Sweetwater
- Incredible String Band
- Bert Sommer (Joan Baez is seen talking about him during her backstage interview)
- Tim Hardin (some of his dialogue is included)
- Ravi Shankar
- Melanie
- Quill
- Keef Hartley
- Mountain
- Grateful Dead (a sound bite of Jerry Garcia is included)
- Creedence Clearwater Revival
- The Band
- Blood, Sweat & Tears
- Johnny and Edgar Winter
- Paul Butterfield Blues Band

== Release ==
The film opened at seven theaters in the United States and Canada on March 26, 1970 (Boston, Coral Gables, Dallas, Los Angeles, New York, Toronto and Washington D.C.) and set opening day house records in each one with grosses totalling $41,633. It opened at a further theater in New York City on April 1.

== Reception and legacy ==
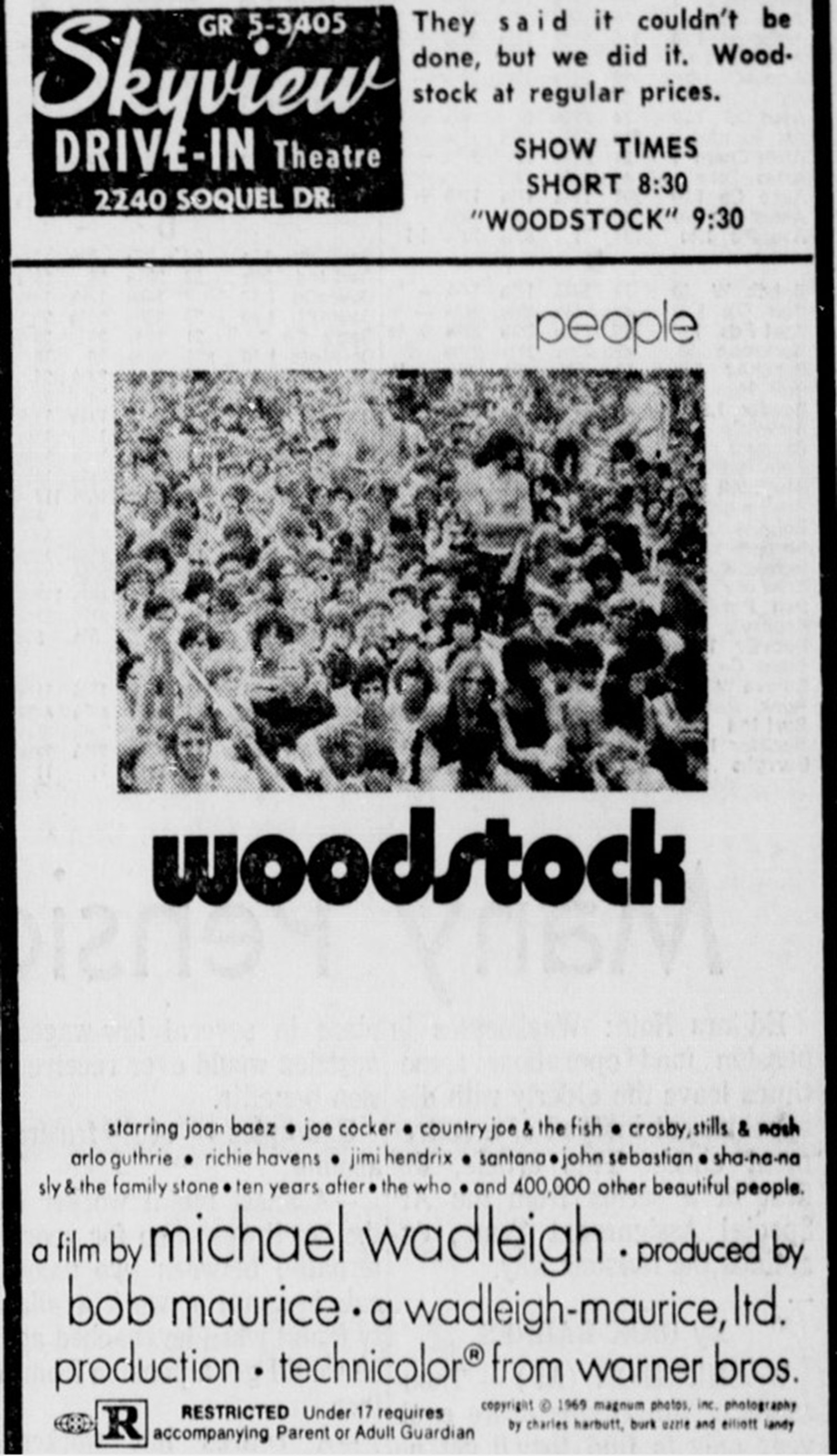
Drive-in advertisement from 1970

Woodstock received universal acclaim from newspaper and magazine critics in 1970. It was also an enormous box-office smash. The edition of May 20, 1970 of Variety reported it was doing well in its third week in Chicago and San Francisco. In each of those metropolitan areas the movie played at only one cinema during that week, but many thousands showed up. Eventually, after it branched out to more cinemas including more than one per metropolitan area, it grossed $50 million in the United States. The budget for its production was just $600,000, making it not only the fifth highest-grossing film of 1970 but one of the most profitable movies of that year as well.

Decades after its initial release, the film earned a rare 100% "Fresh" rating on Rotten Tomatoes, based on 25 reviews, with a weighted average of 8.6/10. The critical consensus reads: "By documenting arguably the most renowned music festival in history, Woodstock: 3 Days of Peace & Music achieves the rare feat of capturing the unique spirit of its time." Metacritic, which uses a weighted average, assigned the film a score of 95 out of 100, based on 9 critics, indicating "universal acclaim" reviews.

In his original 1970 review, Roger Ebert rated the movie 4 stars (out of 4) and described it as "maybe the best documentary ever made in America", adding "The remarkable thing about Wadleigh's film is that it succeeds so completely in making us feel how it must have been to be there". In 2005 Ebert added Woodstock to his Great Movies list and wrote a retrospective review that stated, "Woodstock is a beautiful, moving, ultimately great film...Now that the period is described as a far-ago time like "the 1920s" or "the 1930s," how touching it is in this film to see the full flower of its moment, of its youth and hope."

In 1996, Woodstock was selected for preservation in the United States National Film Registry by the Library of Congress as being "culturally, historically, or aesthetically significant".

In the science fiction thriller The Omega Man (1971), Colonel Robert Neville (played by Charlton Heston) is seen traveling to a movie theatre in Los Angeles to screen the film for himself alone. Woodstock had been a recent film debuting prior to release of The Omega Man, and had been held over (continuously run) in some theaters for months. Neville darkly remarks the film is so popular it was "held over for the third straight year". As he repeats some of the dialogue verbatim, it is clear that Neville has repeated the ritual many times during the two years that he has believed himself to be the last man alive on Earth.

In a 2009 review, Noel Murray of The A.V. Club graded the DVD release A−, stating "Wadleigh crafted a film with a thoughtful flow; it tells the full story of the event, from the paranoia (and eventual acceptance) of the locals to the helpful attitudes (and eventual paranoia) of the throng. Woodstock runs for more than 20 minutes before Wadleigh even gets to any of the performances, and throughout the film, he cuts away to interviews and montages that map out the scope of the mini-community formed at Woodstock, in all its glories and sadness." Entertainment Weekly called this film the benchmark of concert movies and one of the most entertaining documentaries ever made.

== Subsequent editions ==
=== 25th Anniversary Director's Cut (1994) ===
Upon the festival's 25th anniversary, in July 1994, a 224 minutes director's cut of the film — subtitled 3 Days of Peace & Music — was released theatrically in cinemas and later on DVD. It added over 40 minutes and included additional performances by Canned Heat, Jefferson Airplane and Janis Joplin. Jimi Hendrix's set at the end of the film was also extended with two additional numbers.

Woodstock Generation
19**–20**
R.I.P.
it up
Tear it up
have a Ball

— Woodstock (director's cut) closing credits

After the closing credits — featuring Crosby, Stills, Nash & Young's "Find the Cost of Freedom" — a list of prominent people from the "Woodstock Generation" who had died is shown, including John F. Kennedy, Malcolm X, Che Guevara, Martin Luther King Jr., Mama Cass Elliot, Jim Morrison, John Lennon, Max Yasgur, Roy Orbison, Abbie Hoffman, Paul Butterfield, Keith Moon, Bob Hite, Richard Manuel, Janis Joplin and Jimi Hendrix. It ends with the epitaph to the right:

=== 40th Anniversary edition (2009) ===
On June 9, 2009, a 40th-anniversary edition was released in two-disc sets on Blu-ray and DVD, available as both a "Special Edition" and an "Ultimate Collector's Edition". The latter included copious memorabilia. The director's cut was newly remastered in high definition with a 2K scan of the original elements, and provided a new 5.1 audio mix. Among the special features are 18 never-before-seen performances from artists such as Joan Baez, Country Joe McDonald, Santana, The Who, Jefferson Airplane, Canned Heat and Joe Cocker; five of the artists included—Paul Butterfield, Creedence Clearwater Revival, The Grateful Dead, Johnny Winter and Mountain—played at Woodstock but had never appeared in any film version.

The bonus songs, a 143-minute collection of 18 performances presented in standard definition, are entitled "Untold Stories":

- Joan Baez: "{I Live} One Day at a Time" (4:17)
- Country Joe McDonald: "Flying High" (2:21)
- Santana: "Evil Ways" (3:56)
- Canned Heat: "I'm Her Man" (5.33)
- Canned Heat: "On the Road Again" (10.49)
- Mountain: "Beside the Sea" (3:38)
- Mountain: "Southbound Train" (6:17)
- The Grateful Dead: "Turn on Your Love Light" (37:44)
- Creedence Clearwater Revival: "Born on the Bayou" (5:12)
- Creedence Clearwater Revival: "I've Put a Spell on You" (4:10)
- Creedence Clearwater Revival: "Keep on Chooglin" (9:25)
- The Who: "We're Not Going to Take It" (9:07)
- The Who: "My Generation" (7:36)
- Jefferson Airplane: "3/5 of a Mile in 10 Seconds" (5:40)
- Joe Cocker: "Something's Coming On" (4:14)
- Johnny Winter: "Mean Town Blues" (10:52)
- Paul Butterfield: "Morning Sunrise" (8:26)
- Sha Na Na: "Teen Angel" (3:21)

The bonus featurettes, also in standard definition, last 77 minutes. Titled "Woodstock: From Festival to Feature," they cover the festival, the challenges of making the film, its reception and legacy, and other topics:

- The Camera
- 365,000 Feet of Film
- Shooting Stage
- The Lineup
- Holding the Negative Hostage
- Announcements
- Suits vs. Longhairs
- Documenting History
- Woodstock: The Journey
- Pre-Production
- Production
- Synchronization
- The Crowd
- No Rain! No Rain!
- 3 Days in a Truck
- The Woodstock Effect
- Living Up to Idealism
- World's Longest Optical
- Critical Acclaim
- The Hog Farm Commune (Courtesy of The Museum at Bethel Woods)
- Hugh Hefner and Michael Wadleigh (The Woodstock Connection)

=== Woodstock: 3 Days of Peace & Music – The Director's Cut, 40th Anniversary Revisited (2014) ===
This edition contains the same Blu-ray version of the film released in 2009 along with the second Blu-ray disc of bonus features, but the latter are now presented in high definition. The set also adds a third Blu-ray disc with sixteen more previously unreleased performances and eight more featurettes.

The 16 performances, which total 73 minutes, are titled "Untold Stories Revisited":

1. Melanie: "Mr. Tambourine Man/Tuning My Guitar" (6:18)
2. Joan Baez: "Oh Happy Day" (3:59)
3. Joan Baez: "I Shall Be Released" (3:38)
4. Santana: "Persuasion" (2:55)
5. Canned Heat: "Woodstock Boogie" (8:38)
6. The Grateful Dead: "Mama Tried" (2:53)
7. The Who: "Sparks" (5:25)
8. The Who: "Pinball Wizard" (2:51)
9. Jefferson Airplane: "Volunteers" (2:53)
10. Jefferson Airplane: "Come Back Baby" (5:56)
11. Country Joe and the Fish: "Not So Sweet Martha Lorraine" (4:23)
12. Crosby, Stills & Nash: "Helplessly Hoping" (2:27)
13. Crosby, Stills & Nash: "Marrakesh Express" (2:55)
14. The Paul Butterfield Blues Band: "Everything's Gonna Be Alright" (8:53)
15. Sha Na Na: "Book of Love" (2:07)
16. Jimi Hendrix: "Spanish Castle Magic" (7:09)

The eight featurettes are titled "Woodstock: From Festival to Feature Revisited." They run a total of 32 minutes and cover the festival behind the scenes, its history and legacy, and the restoration of the film:

1. Restoration
2. Technical Difficulties
3. Woodstock: A Turning Point
4. Food, Lodging & First Aid
5. Reflections of an Era
6. Woodstock: A Farm in Bethel
7. A Cinematic Revolution
8. The Woodstock Generation

== See also ==
- List of American films of 1970
- There are two films about the Harlem Cultural Festival that was of roughly equivalent size that ran during July and August 1969.
  - Black Woodstock, a series of Black pride concerts held in 1969 in Harlem, Manhattan, New York City, New York
  - Summer of Soul (2021 film)
- New Hollywood, American film movement of the mid-1960s to the early 1980s
- My Generation (2000 film)
- Taking Woodstock (2009 film)
- Woodstock Revisited (2009 film)
- Summer of Soul (2009 film)
- Woodstock 99: Peace, Love, and Rage, 2021 documentary
- Trainwreck: Woodstock '99 (2022 miniseries)

== Bibliography ==
- Kato, M. T. (2007). From Kung Fu to Hip Hop: Globalization, Revolution, and Popular Culture. SUNY Press. ISBN 978-0-7914-6991-0. Cf. pp.82-onward & various.
- Saunders, Dave (2007). Direct Cinema: Observational Documentary and the Politics of the Sixties. London: Wallflower Press. ISBN 978-1-905674-16-9.
- Bell, Dale, ed. (1999). Woodstock An Inside Look at the Movie that Shook Up the World and Defined a Generation. Studio City: Michael Wiese Productions. ISBN 0-941188-71-X.
