= The Coming Global Superstorm =

1999 book by Art Bell and Whitley Strieber

- First edition
- Author: Art Bell, Whitley Strieber
- Language: English
- Publisher: Atria Books
- Publication date: 1999
- ISBN: 0-671-04190-8

The Coming Global Superstorm (ISBN 0-671-04190-8) is a 1999 book by Art Bell and Whitley Strieber, which claims that global warming might produce sudden and catastrophic climate change. The eBook was published in 2001.

== Thesis ==
First, the authors assert that the Gulf Stream and North Atlantic Drift circulate warm water that affects Arctic regions, the related mechanisms of which they claim prevent cold air in the far north from migrating southward. Second, they claim that were the North Atlantic Drift to shut down, that barrier would fail, releasing this flood of low-temperature air southward into the Northern Hemisphere, causing sudden and drastic shifts in weather systems and potentially triggering either another ice age or extreme flooding. (Note: The current scientific discourse over AMOC collapse and any hypothesized resultant cooling in Europe rely on a somewhat different theoretical framework.)

The book discusses a possible cause of the failure of the Gulf Stream: the melting of the polar ice caps could drastically affect the ocean salinity of the North Atlantic Drift by dumping a large quantity of freshwater into the world's oceans.

Bell and Strieber contend that such destabilizations have occurred before, citing seemingly impossible engineering feats by ancient civilizations that they propose must have been catastrophically destroyed since they do not appear in the historical record. Among their examples are the archaeological ruins of Nan Madol, which the book claims were built with exacting tolerances and extremely heavy basalt materials, necessitating a high degree of technical competency. Bell and Strieber claim that no such society exists in the modern record, or even in legend, so one must have been destroyed by dramatic means.

Strieber and Bell assert that mammoths have been found preserved with food still in their mouths and undigested matter in their stomachs, so they must have been killed quickly in otherwise normal conditions. The book claims that they were preserved so well due to quick freezing, which is taken as evidence of a rapid onset of a global blizzard or some similar event.

== In popular culture ==
Interspersed with the analytical parts of the book are a series of short interlinked fictional scenarios. Written in italics, they describe what might transpire today if a destabilization of the North Atlantic Current were to occur. These fictional accounts were the basis of the 2004 science fiction film The Day After Tomorrow. Indeed, some events from the book are portrayed in the film with little modification, such as the Gulf Stream's collapse causing large portions of the Northern Hemisphere to experience extreme cold, including New York City.

== Response ==
Anthropogenic global climate change is widely accepted as established fact, and the prediction of cooling European temperatures resulting from AMOC collapse is indeed a topic in contemporary scientific discourse; however, some of the underlying science cited by the authors as well as some of the conclusions have been called into question. The film it inspired has likewise been challenged regarding its scientific accuracy, though lauded in some circles for raising awareness of anthropogenic climate change in general.

== See also ==
- Arnold Federbush, author of Ice!, a 1978 novel with similar themes
- The Day After Tomorrow, a 2004 film based on the book
