= Alien Abduction: Answers =

- Directed by: John Yost
- Written by: John Yost
- Produced by: Debz Shakti; Patty Greco; Mark Sims; Mark Macuga; Ray Proya
- Cinematography: Tad Makowiecki; Scott Devinney; Dan Macuga
- Edited by: Joey Kelly
- Production company: Ryno Pictures
- Release date: 2022
- Country: United States
- Language: English

Alien Abduction: Answers is a 2022 American documentary film written and directed by John Yost that explores the phenomenon of alien abductions. Whitley Strieber, who famously claimed his own such encounter in the book Communion, appears in the documentary. The film had its world premiere at the 2022 MidWest WeirdFest film festival, where it won Best Documentary.

== Premise ==
The film seeks to explain the phenomenon surrounding claims of alien abduction. Alanna Robelia, who appears in the film as an experiencer, said, "I am grateful to director John Yost for creating a safe place for all of us to tell our stories and his willingness to be vulnerable by telling us about his own abduction experience. I never would have imagined that what I thought was a memory of a childhood dream would lead me to the incredible experiences and relationships I have today."

== Marketing ==
On February 19, 2022, Strieber appeared on Coast to Coast AM and discussed the film, calling it, "one of the most insightful films on the topic".

== See also ==
- Alien abduction
