= Harvey Hess =

American poet

- Born: Harvey Jason Hess, III; February 14, 1939; Waterloo, Iowa
- Died: July 18, 2012 (aged 73); Waterloo, Iowa
- Education: B.A., McPherson College; M.A., University of Northern Iowa
- Occupations: Poet; librettist; educator; critic; theologian
- Writing career
- Language: English
- Notable works: Sonnet sequences "Th'Autumnal Sequence" and "Ruins Consequential"

Harvey Hess (February 14, 1939 – July 18, 2012) was an American poet, librettist, educator, arts critic and theologian. His life and work are associated primarily with the states of Iowa and Hawaii.

== Biography ==
Harvey Jason Hess, III of Waterloo, Iowa was the first of three children born to parents Harvey J. Hess Jr. and Esther Miller Hess. His sister Lucy Schempp lives in Decorah, Iowa and Linda Hess in Spokane, Washington. Harvey received early music training, played flute in the Waterloo/Cedar Falls Symphony, and was an amateur countertenor. He earned a BA degree from McPherson College, McPherson, Kansas (1961); an MA degree from University of Northern Iowa, Cedar Falls, Iowa (1995); and studied at Bethany Theological Seminary, Oak Brook, Illinois (1962–1964). He also studied French language and culture at la Sorbonne in Paris, France (1957) and the Japanese language at the University of Washington, Seattle (1963).

He taught English, Creative Writing and Humanities courses at Hawkeye Community College (1992–2007) in Waterloo and the University of Northern Iowa in Cedar Falls (1989–2011). He was Music and Arts critic for The Waterloo-Cedar Falls Courier for twenty years (1987–2008) and, before that, the Music critic for the Spokane Spokesman-Review in Spokane, Washington (1984 - 1987). He edited the Haiku column for the Hawaii Tribune Herald, in Hilo, Hawai'i (1978–1983), was the Hawai'i Island correspondent for Ha'ilono Mele, the Journal of the Hawaiian Music Foundation (1977–1979) - Aunty Edith Kanakaʻole, “Hilo Kumu Hula George Naʻope” (April, 1980); and had articles published in The Instrumentalist and Opera Monthly. He wrote the "Hawaii" entry for the second edition of The New Grove Dictionary of Music and Musicians.

Harvey specialized in poetry with meter and rhyme systems, lyrics for musical setting, and Japanese poetic forms in English: Tanka, Senryū and Haiku. Five books of his poetry have been published. In collaboration with composer Jerre Tanner he wrote librettos for seven operas, three of which are of notable historic interest (The Garland of Kāne-first opera based in Hawaiian culture; The Singing Snails-first Hawaiian opera for youth; The Kona Coffee Cantata-first recorded Hawaiian opera), three choral symphonies, song cycles, concert arias and art songs. His haiku have been published internationally, including in Japan. He co-authored with composer Tanner the two-volume book Hawaiian Opera, an Exposition and Development of a Life Vision (2008–2022). His collected papers are in Special Collections, Rod Library, University of Northern Iowa.

He received grants and commissions from the Hawaii State Foundation on Culture and the Arts (1973, 1975, 1979), the National and Hawaii Bicentennial Commissions (1975), Continental Harmony-administered by the American Composers Forum (1999), Summit Choral Society, Akron, Ohio (2000), and the Iowa Arts Council (2002).

== Bibliography ==
- Lyric Images, (with photographs by Gary M. Mason); private publication, Waterloo, Iowa 1962
- Ouch Gonzui Sha; Gonzui Sha, Tokyo, Japan pg. 4 Vol. 3 No. 4, Winter 1979
- Modern Haiku 10th. Anniversary Issue, Madison, Wisconsin pgs. 9, 16, 57 Vol. X No. 3, Autumn 1979
- Orchid Art and the Orchid Isle, (with paintings and drawings by John Paul Thomas); Malama Arts Inc., Kailua-Kona, Hawaii 1982 ISBN 0-931909-03-1
- Hawaii Lyrics; Finial Press, Champaign, Illinois 1985
- The Coffee Cantata (BWV211) and The Kona Coffee Cantata librettos; Malama Arts Inc., Kailua-Kona, Hawaii 1986 ISBN 978-0-931909-05-4
- The Singing Snails libretto; Malama Arts Inc., Kailua-Kona, Hawaii 1986 ISBN 0-931909-08-2
- The Garland of Kane libretto; Malama Arts Inc., Kailua-Kona, Hawaii 1987 ISBN 0-931909-10-4
- Skipped Stones – Faces in Time; Eight Pound Tiger Press, Cedar Falls, Iowa 1994
- Th’Autumnal Sequence – Sonnets of the Fall (a collection of 53 sonnets); Eight Pound Tiger Press, Cedar Falls, Iowa 2002
- Hess, Harvey; Tanner, Jerre (2022). ‘‘Hawaiian Opera, an Exposition and Development of a Life Vision’’, Volume 1. Honolulu, Hawai'i. Editions Art – Poetry. ISBN 979838 9884212.
- Hess, Harvey; Tanner, Jerre (2022). Hawaiian Opera, Volume 2. ISBN 979838 9890749.

== See also ==
- American poets § H List of poets from the United States (H)
