= Arnold Federbush =

American novelist

Cover of Ice! 1978 paperback edition

Arnold Federbush (March 16, 1935 — September 14, 1993) was a film and sound editor who wrote two science fiction novels in the 1970s.

Federbush was born in New York, the son of a clothing manufacturer who had been a colleague in Palestine of Zeev Jabotinsky. He attended UCLA's film school, where his classmates included Francis Ford Coppola and Noel Black. His ambition was to be a screenwriter. After some years working as a film editor for Black and others, and finding that pitches for screenplays were better received if they were based on already published books, he wrote his two novels, both of which were successful enough to be translated into many European languages. Federbush was a lifelong fitness enthusiast, and a non-smoking member of the original Muscle Beach crowd.

His two published works are:

- The Man who Lived in Inner Space (1973), ISBN 0-395-14074-9. It concerns a marine biologist who is transformed into a new species of amphibious humanity, which can live in the ocean depths, Earth's "inner space".
- Ice! (1978), ISBN 0-553-12151-0. It describes a return of the Ice Age in months, rather than centuries. It tells of the realization that an Ice Age is rapidly approaching, yet only a few people know this. And in effect, major weather changes begin to kill out large parts of Earth's population before the glaciers even hit the higher latitudes. Many details of the plot, characters, and locale are similar to the 2004 film The Day After Tomorrow.

Federbush was diagnosed with lung cancer after it had already spread to his liver. He died with his third novel, concerning spontaneous human combustion, unfinished.
