= Michael Wadleigh =

American film director and cinematographer

- Born: September 24, 1939 (age 86); Akron, Ohio, U.S.
- Occupations: Film director and cinematographer
- Known for: Woodstock; Wolfen

Michael Wadleigh (born September 24, 1939, in Akron, Ohio) is an American film director and cinematographer known for his documentary of the 1969 Woodstock Festival, Woodstock.

== Early life ==
Wadleigh is native of Akron, Ohio. Wadleigh was in the same class as Martin Scorsese at NYU.

== Career ==
Wadleigh entered films in his early twenties as a cinematographer on independently produced low-budget films David Holzman's Diary and I Call First (both 1967), and My Girlfriend's Wedding (1969). He gained notice for his work from critics who followed independent and underground films, but the films, primarily aimed at a specialized and counterculture audience, brought him no financial success.

In 1969, Wadleigh undertook the monumental task of documenting the Woodstock Music Festival. He arrived on the site in Bethel, New York on August 15, with over a thousand reels of film and a crew of several camera operators. The finished product was said to have consisted of about 120 miles of footage which, over the next months, was edited down to 184 minutes. Warner Bros., the film's primary financial backer, released it on March 26, 1970.

The film, which reportedly cost $600,000 to produce, earned over $50 million in the United States and more millions from foreign rentals, but due to a complicated arrangement with Warner Bros., Wadleigh received only a small percentage of the profits. Woodstock stands as a milestone in the documentary film field, receiving an Academy Award for Documentary Feature at the 1971 ceremony.

Janis, a 1974 documentary about Janis Joplin, gave Wadleigh credit as cinematographer for his archive footage, but it would be eleven years after the release of Woodstock before he received his next, and to date last, directorial credit: Wolfen, a unique 1981 horror phantasmagoria, based on the novel The Wolfen by Whitley Strieber, was praised for its dreamlike nature and striking visual quality, but despite a top-notch star turn from Albert Finney, turned out to have been too offbeat for the general public to achieve financial success. Wadleigh also wrote the Wolfen screenplay and has a bit part as "Terrorist Informer".

In August 1994, twenty-four years after its original showing, a 228-minute "director's cut" of Woodstock was released, and in 1999, another Woodstock-based documentary, Jimi Hendrix: Live at Woodstock, gave Wadleigh another archive footage credit for cinematography.

== Filmography ==
Cinematographer

- David Holtzman's Diary (1967)
- I Call First (1967)
- No Vietnamese Ever Called Me Nigger (1968)
- My Girlfriend's Wedding (1969)
- Woodstock (1970)
- Janis (1974)

Director

- Woodstock (1970)
- Wolfen (1981) (Also writer and actor)
- Jimi Hendrix: Live at Woodstock (1999)
