= The Hunger (1983 film) =

Film by Tony Scott

- Theatrical release poster
- Directed by: Tony Scott
- Screenplay by: Ivan Davis; Michael Thomas
- Based on: The Hunger by Whitley Strieber
- Produced by: Richard Shepherd
- Starring: Catherine Deneuve; David Bowie; Susan Sarandon; Cliff De Young
- Cinematography: Stephen Goldblatt
- Edited by: Pamela Power
- Music by: Michel Rubini; Denny Jaeger
- Production companies: Metro-Goldwyn-Mayer; Peerford Ltd.
- Distributed by: MGM/UA Entertainment Co.
- Release date: 29 April 1983 (United States)
- Running time: 97 minutes
- Countries: United States; United Kingdom
- Language: English
- Box office: $12.3 million

The Hunger is a 1983 erotic horror film directed by Tony Scott in his directorial debut, starring Catherine Deneuve, David Bowie and Susan Sarandon. An international co-production of Metro-Goldwyn-Mayer and Peerford Ltd., the film is a loose adaptation of the 1981 novel of the same name by Whitley Strieber, with a screenplay by Ivan Davis and Michael Thomas. Its plot concerns a vampire (Deneuve) who bestows immortality and apparently eternal youth on her lovers. However, the latter proves unreliable, and her lover at the beginning of the film (Bowie) undergoes rapid ageing, leading her to take a new lover, a doctor who specialises in sleep and ageing research (Sarandon). The film's special effects were handled by make-up effects artist Dick Smith.

The Hunger was released in the spring of 1983 by Metro-Goldwyn-Mayer. Though it received a mixed critical response, the film has accrued a cult following within the goth subculture in the years since its release.

== Plot ==
Miriam Blaylock is a vampire, seen in flashbacks drinking blood from victims in Ancient Egypt, who promises eternal life to humans chosen as her vampire lovers. Her current companion is John, a talented cellist whom she met in 18th-century France. In a nightclub in New York City, they connect with a young couple whom they bring home and feed upon by slashing their throats with bladed ankh pendants. The victims' bodies are disposed of in an incinerator in the basement of Miriam and John's elegant New York townhouse, where they pose as a wealthy couple who teach classical music.

Now, 200 years after he was turned, John begins suffering from insomnia and ages years within only a few days. John realises Miriam's promise – that killing and feeding upon human victims would give him immortality – was only partially true; he will have eternal life, but not eternal youth. He seeks Dr. Sarah Roberts, a gerontology researcher, who, with her colleagues Charlie and Tom (also Sarah's boyfriend), are studying the effects of rapid ageing in primates. He hopes they can reverse his accelerating decrepitude. Sarah assumes that John is delusional and ignores his plea for help. As the angered John leaves the clinic, Sarah is horrified to see how rapidly he is ageing and offers her help, but John rebuffs her.

One of the Blaylocks' students, Alice Cavender, drops by the couple's townhouse to say that she cannot attend the next day's lesson. In a last attempt to regain his youth, John murders and feeds upon Alice, whom Miriam was grooming to be her next consort once she came of age. However, Alice's blood does nothing to restore him, so John begs Miriam to kill him and release him from the agony of his decrepit body. Weeping, Miriam tells him there is no release. After John collapses in the basement, Miriam carries him to the attic, which is filled with coffins, and places him in one. Like John, Miriam's former vampire lovers suffer an eternal living-death, helplessly moaning and trapped in their coffins. Sarah comes looking for John at his home. Miriam claims her husband is in Switzerland. Sarah asks to be updated on John's condition. Later, a police official comes to the residence, looking for the missing Alice. Miriam feigns ignorance.

Sarah returns to Miriam's home to inquire again about John. Miriam, who feels alone after losing both John and Alice, initiates a sexual encounter with Sarah, during which Miriam bites her arm, and some of Miriam's blood enters Sarah's body.

Sarah returns home and goes out to dinner with her boyfriend Tom, who becomes argumentative when she rejects food and is evasive about her three-and-a-half-hour disappearance at the Blaylock residence. Later she feels sick and vomits. The next day, at the lab, the team investigates Sarah's blood and finds that she has an infection, in the form of a foreign and inhuman type of blood, that is taking over her own. Confused, Sarah returns to confront Miriam, who attempts to initiate Sarah into the necessities of life as a vampire, but Sarah is repulsed by the thought of subsisting on human blood. Still reeling from the effects of her vampiric transformation, Sarah allows Miriam to put her to bed in a guest room.

Tom arrives at Miriam's home, looking for Sarah. Miriam shows him to the upstairs bedroom, where Sarah, starving and desperate, kills and feeds upon him. Miriam assures her that she will soon forget her old life. As the two kiss, Sarah drives Miriam's ankh knife into her own throat and holds her mouth over Miriam's, forcing Miriam to ingest her blood. Miriam carries Sarah upstairs, intending to place her with her other boxed lovers. A rumbling occurs, and the mummies of Miriam's previous lovers, including John, emerge from their coffins, driving her over the edge of the balcony. As Miriam begins to rapidly age, the mummies become dust.

The police investigator returns to find a real estate agent showing the townhouse to prospective buyers. Sarah is now in London with two new companions, standing on the balcony of a flat in the Barbican Estate's Cromwell Tower, admiring the view as dusk falls. From a draped coffin in a storage room, Miriam continuously cries Sarah's name.

== Cast ==
- Catherine Deneuve as Miriam Blaylock
- David Bowie as John Blaylock
- Susan Sarandon as Sarah Roberts
- Cliff De Young as Tom Haver
- Dan Hedaya as Lieutenant Allegrezza
- Beth Ehlers as Alice Cavender
- Rufus Collins as Charlie Humphries

Willem Dafoe and John Pankow make cameo appearances as two youths harassing Sarah Roberts at a phone booth. John Stephen Hill and Ann Magnuson play a wild young couple whom Miriam and John pick up at a nightclub to consume at the start of the film. James Aubrey plays a man whom Miriam brings to Sarah as her potential first victim.

English gothic rock band Bauhaus appears during the film's opening credits as a group performing at the nightclub, with Peter Murphy onscreen, where they play their single "Bela Lugosi's Dead." Silent film star Bessie Love makes her final film appearance as an elderly fan at Sarah's book signing.

== Production ==
The final scene of Sarah on the balcony was added at the studio's behest to leave the film open-ended and allow for possible sequels. Sarandon later expressed regret that this sequence seemed to make no sense in the context of the rest of the film: "The thing that made the film interesting to me was this question of, 'Would you want to live forever if you were an addict?' But as the film progressed, the powers that be rewrote the ending and decided that I wouldn't die, so what was the point? All the rules that we'd spent the entire film delineating, that Miriam lived forever and was indestructible, and all the people that she transformed [eventually] died, and that I killed myself rather than be an addict [were ignored]. Suddenly, I was kind of living, she was kind of half dying... Nobody knew what was going on, and I thought that was a shame."

Bowie was excited to work on the film but was concerned about the final product. He said "I must say, there's nothing that looks like it on the market. But I'm a bit worried that it's just perversely bloody at some points."

== Music ==
Howard Blake was musical director on The Hunger. Although a soundtrack album accompanied the film's release (Varèse Sarabande VSD 47261), this issue omits much of the music used in the film.

Blake noted on working with director Tony Scott, "Tony wanted to create a score largely using classical music and I researched this, many days going to his home in Wimbledon with stacks of recordings to play to him. One of these was the duet for two sopranos from Delibes' Lakmé, which I recorded specially with Elaine Barry and Judith Rees, conducting my orchestra The Sinfonia of London. Howard Shelley joined with Ralph Holmes and Raphael Wallfisch to record the second movement of Schubert's Piano Trio in E flat. Ralph recorded the Gigue from Bach's Violin Partita in E and Raphael the Prelude to Bach's Solo Cello Sonata in G, to which Bowie mimed. I was persuaded to appear in one scene as a pianist, for which I wrote a 'Dolphin Square Blues'. Tony wanted to add a synthesizer score and I introduced him to Hans Zimmer, then working at The Snake Ranch Studio in Fulham but Tony eventually used a score by Michel Rubini and Denny Jaeger with electronics by David Lawson. It is hard however to exactly separate these elements."

== Reception ==
The Hunger was nominated for two Saturn Awards for Best Costume and Best Make-up, while receiving mixed reviews upon its release: its pacing and plot were felt to be unsatisfactory, with more emphasis seemingly being placed on cinematography and atmosphere. Roger Ebert of the Chicago Sun-Times described the film as "an agonizingly bad vampire movie," remarking that the sex scene between Deneuve and Sarandon is effective, but that the film is so heavy on set design and scene cuts that any sense of a story is lost. In a brief review in Rolling Stone, Michael Sragow similarly called it "A minor horror movie with a major modern-movie problem: director Tony Scott develops so many ingenious ways to illustrate his premise that there's no time left to tell a story."

Christopher John reviewed The Hunger in Ares Magazine #15 and commented that "Beautifully filmed, but boringly void of substance, The Hunger is (was) a film to be avoided like the plague."

Camille Paglia wrote in Sexual Personae (1990) that while The Hunger comes close to being a masterpiece of a "classy genre of vampire film", it is "ruined by horrendous errors, as when the regal Catherine Deneuve is made to crawl around on all fours, slavering over cut throats", which Paglia considered an inappropriate focus on violence rather than sex. Critic Elaine Showalter called The Hunger a "post-modernist vampire film" that "casts vampirism in bisexual terms, drawing on the tradition of the lesbian vampire...Contemporary and stylish, [it] is also disquieting in its suggestion that men and women in the 1980s have the same desires, the same appetites, and the same needs for power, money, and sex." David Bowie later commented about the film that "the first twenty minutes rattle along like hell – it really is a great opening. It loses its way about there, but it's still an interesting movie."

On the review aggregator website Rotten Tomatoes, The Hunger holds a 62% approval rating based on 42 reviews, with an average rating of 6.3/10. The consensus reads: "Stylish yet hollow, The Hunger is a well-cast vampire thriller that mistakes erotic moments for a satisfying story." Metacritic, which uses a weighted average, assigned the film a score of 52 out of 100, based on 13 critics, indicating "mixed or average" reviews.

The film grossed $6 million in the United States and Canada and $12.3 million worldwide.

== Legacy ==
Hollywood just hated that movie. They called it, "Esoteric, artsy-fartsy".

— Tony Scott

The Hunger has been listed as a cult film. A retrospective review of the film by Film at Lincoln Center concluded: "With its famously bold visual aesthetic—featuring high-intensity lighting, expressionistic production design, and thrillingly intimate perspectives—and the melodramatic intensity of the three lead performances, the film is an ultra-stylish time capsule, an archetype of the high-gloss, high-concept storytelling mode that prevailed in early 1980s Hollywood." The film is popular with some segments of the goth subculture and inspired a short-lived TV series of the same name, although the series has no direct plot or character connection to it.

The film has been cited by publisher Fred Berger as an influence on the creation and direction of his gothic subculture magazine Propaganda, and by showrunner Bryan Fuller on his television series Hannibal. The movie was the inspiration for the Alexander McQueen fashion collection The Hunger (Spring/Summer 1996).

=== Remake ===
On 23 September 2009, Warner Bros. Pictures announced it planned a remake of the film, with the screenplay written by Whitley Strieber. Warner Bros, after years of silence, shared news about the remake in 2021 with a new screenplay by Jessica Sharzer and it being produced by Greg Berlanti, Sarah Schechter and Mike McGrath.

== See also ==
- The Celluloid Closet, a 1996 documentary about LGBT depictions in film, in which Sarandon talks candidly about The Hunger's lesbian seduction scene.
