= The Hunger (Strieber novel) =

Novel by Whitley Strieber

- 1981 hardback edition
- Author: Whitley Strieber
- Language: English
- Genre: Fantasy, horror, romance, science fiction, vampire
- Publisher: William Morrow
- Publication date: 1981
- Publication place: United States
- Media type: Print (Hardback & Paperback)
- Pages: 320
- ISBN: 978-0-688-03757-4

The Hunger (1981) is a novel by Whitley Strieber. The plot involves a beautiful and wealthy vampire named Miriam Blaylock who takes human lovers and transforms them into vampire-human hybrids.

The novel is unusual in that it deals with the practical considerations of vampirism, such as the difficulty in obtaining victims and concealing frequent murders. The Hunger suggests a science-fiction explanation for vampirism, that vampires are a species that resembles humans. They are not immortal but do not age after reaching physical maturity, and are extremely strong and difficult to kill. Miriam discovers that some vampire traits, such as prolonged youth, can be transmitted to humans by performing a blood transfusion.

Strieber wrote two sequels to the novel: The Last Vampire in 2001 and Lilith's Dream: A Tale of the Vampire Life in 2003.

== Plot synopsis ==
Miriam Blaylock is a vampire whose life began in ancient Egypt: her mother Lamia was also a vampire, which overlaps with some attributes of the figure from Greek mythology sharing the same name. She has taken human companions (male or female) to ease her loneliness. While her blood will grant them greatly expanded lifespans, they (unlike her) eventually begin to age, a process that cannot be halted. Eventually, they wither to dusty shells, but unfortunately for them, they remain conscious. Unable to bear the thought of murdering her lovers, Miriam imprisons them in steel-encased chests to keep with her for eternity.

The novel begins when John, her most recent companion, suddenly begins to age. Miriam is surprised at the brief amount of time that John lasted (only about 200 years). She has been secretly following the work of Dr. Sarah Roberts, a brilliant young physician whose research may hold the key to immortality for her lover. John becomes too uncontrollable for Miriam to deal with, and she soon sets her sights on another companion, Sarah.

== Film adaptation ==
The 1983 film The Hunger was directed by Tony Scott, starring Catherine Deneuve as Miriam Blaylock, David Bowie as her husband John, and Susan Sarandon as Dr. Sarah Roberts.

== International titles ==
- French: Les Prédateurs (The Predators)
- German: Der Kuss der Todes (The Kiss of Death)
- Spanish: El ansia (The Craving)
- Brazilian Portuguese: Fome de Viver (Hunger for Life)
