= The Wild (novel) =

1991 novel by Whitley Strieber

- First edition
- Author: Whitley Strieber
- Language: English
- Genre: Fantasy
- Publisher: Tor Books
- Publication date: March 1991
- Publication place: United States
- Media type: Print (paperback)
- Pages: 378 pages
- ISBN: 0-8125-1277-4
- OCLC: 23150180

The Wild is a fantasy novel by American ufologist and horror fiction writer Whitley Strieber that was first published in 1991.

It tells the story of Bob Duke, a failed poet-turned-worker at Sculley-era Apple Computer's New York City branch who can barely pay the bills for his wife and 12-year-old son. However, as his grasp on his family's finances slips by the day, he begins to lose his very physical composition, gradually metamorphosing into a wolf. Soon, his wife, son, and therapist all are drawn into his predicament as he seeks to come to terms with what he has metamorphosed into without losing his still-human mind, or his very family.
