= Dale Bell =

US filmmaker

- Born: May 28, 1938 (age 87)
- Citizenship: USA
- Education: Princeton University
- Occupations: Producer, director, screenwriter and cinematographer
- Years active: 1964-
- Known for: Woodstock

Dale Bell was born on May 28, 1938. He is an American producer, director, screenwriter, and cinematographer. He began his career working on the film Woodstock and has dedicated his life to producing socially engaged documentaries.

== Early life and education ==
His father, Hugo Langdon Bell (1907 - 1992), worked in the cosmetics and perfume industry in New York and served as the president of Bourjois and Barbara Gould starting in 1952. His mother was Dale Thorsen Bell (1907 - 1995). Dale is the second child in the family; his brother, Hugo Lang, was born in 1936, and his sister, Susan Hills, was born in 1940.

Bell grew up in a dysfunctional yet loving and well-off family. At the age of 7, he was sent to boarding school and spent many of his summer vacations at camps. The adults he met there became like a second family to him. It was during this time, in the 1950s, that he dreamed of becoming a documentary producer after watching the Norwegian film Kon-Tiki.

At 16, he left boarding school and traveled around the United States hitchhiking. He worked briefly as a farm laborer before finding a job on a cargo ship bound for Europe.

After attending a preparatory school, he enrolled at Princeton University in New Jersey, where he was welcomed as a star decathlete. During his three years at Princeton, he managed, produced, and directed 24 theater productions. Despite not receiving any funding from the university, he sought help from alumni, and Sir John Gielgud even participated in one of his fundraising events. He graduated with a Bachelor of Arts in Modern Languages and Theater in 1960.

Bell has always been passionate about social issues, which motivated his career path in documentary filmmaking.

== Career ==
=== Early television work ===
After university, Bell moved to New York City, where he worked for three years in ABC Television's shipping department. In 1964, he was hired by National Educational Television as a producer and played a role in shaping public television by securing funding to keep programs on the air. Two years later, he gave Michael Wadleigh his first job as a cameraman, alongside John Binder.

=== Early successes ===
In 1967, Bell successfully gathered numerous international partners to produce Our World with mentor Aubrey Singer, the first live international television broadcast on June 25th. Around this time, he joined the television program Public Broadcasting Laboratory, where he produced the film Hunger in Mississippi with activist Fannie Lou Hamer.

In 1968, Bell met young student Harry Wiland, an independent producer who wanted to make a film about Johnny Cash. Dale helped him secure some funding through National Educational Television.

The following year, Bell and Wadleigh collaborated on the project to film the Woodstock rock festival, held from August 15-18, 1969. With less than a week to go before the event, the director Wadleigh asked Bell, who was associate producer and logistics manager, to organize everything. Bell raised $500,000, rented the necessary equipment, hired around 60 people in 15 film crews, and brought in Martin Scorsese and Thelma Schoonmaker as assistant directors. The documentary Woodstock, released in 1970, won the Oscar for Best Documentary Feature.

=== PBS ===
After exploring commercial television and feature films, Bell returned to public television in 1971 and joined WQED, the first community-funded television station in the USA.

In 1973, he worked on the production team for Martin Scorsese's film Mean Streets. The following year, he reunited with the director as the production manager on the film Italianamerican.

He later oversaw the production of the National Geographic Specials documentary series on PBS, CBS, and NBC. After raising $150,000, he became Vice President of World Production at WQED, managing a $5 million annual budget for producing documentaries, drama films, and artist performances at the Kennedy Center for the Performing Arts in Washington, D.C. In 1980, he raised $8 million to create a series on Kennedy Center artists, and in 1986, the Kennedy Center Honors received a Peabody Award.

Four years later, Bell produced The Chemical People, PBS's first two-part program to raise awareness about drug issues in schools, featuring First Lady Nancy Reagan and Michael Landon.

In 1989, Bell produced the TV series Young Charlie Chaplin, which earned him an Emmy nomination along with other producers. That same year, he worked on the British film series The Chronicles of Narnia, which was also nominated for an Emmy. During his tenure as executive producer of the children's program WonderWorks, the show received the Children's Act Award multiple times.

In 1992, Bell became head of Public Television International, aiming to bring better television programs to public broadcasting.

=== Media Policy Center ===
In 1999, Bell partnered with Harry Wiland to co-found Media Policy Center in 2003, a non-profit production company. Their goal is to address societal issues with a unique approach compared to traditional media.

In October 2002, PBS organized a special evening to broadcast their documentary And Thou Shalt Honor, focused on nursing homes, which was viewed by 16 million people.

In 2006, they were inducted into the Ashoka Fellowship, and the following year, they received a grant from the Purpose Prize, presented by filmmaker Sidney Poitier.

In 2015, following the Volkswagen emissions scandal (Dieselgate), Bell unofficially joined the Californian delegation during the COP21 climate summit in Paris. This led to the release of his documentary Backfired: When VW Lied to America in 2018, which he produced, wrote, and directed.

Over his career, Bell has raised approximately $80 million for his projects.

== Other information ==
Bell draws his primary inspiration from Gordon Parks, an artist who was his mentor. Bell gave Parks his first directing job in 1968 on the NET Journal series episode The World of Piri Thomas, making Parks the first Black director to be employed by a major media company.

Bell has been a member of the Directors Guild of America since 1974 and the Academy of Television Arts & Sciences since 1977.

Between 2014 and 2016, Bell and Wiland helped develop a master's program in "media for social justice" at Woodbury University in Burbank.

On November 12, 2019, he published the book Woodstock: Interviews and Recollections, with a foreword by Martin Scorsese, in which he recounts the behind-the-scenes of the Woodstock documentary.

Dale Bell is also a member of The Explorers Club of New York.

== Personal life ==
Dale Bell has been married 3 times. He currently lives in Santa Monica with his wife, Liz. They married on October 12, 2008. He has four children and six grandchildren.
