= Billy (novel) =

1990 novel by Whitley Strieber

- Author: Whitley Strieber
- Language: English
- Publisher: Putnam Adult
- Publication date: August 20, 1990
- Publication place: United States
- Media type: Print
- Pages: 317 p
- ISBN: 0399135847

Billy is a 1990 novel by Whitley Strieber. The novel tells the story of the abduction of a child and the terror of his experience.

== Plot summary ==
Barton Royal is an overweight man in his 40s who is obsessed with boys. He lives in Los Angeles but travels out of state to find and abduct a suitable young boy so he can be his "father". When he spots 12-year-old Billy Neary in an Iowa shopping mall, he follows the boy home, abducts him late that night, and drives back to California with Billy strapped into the back of his Aerostar minivan. The narrative includes glimpses of Barton's miserable childhood, especially the physical and sexual abuse he suffered at the hands of his father and his recollections of what he has done to other boys before Billy.

Billy tries to escape and also manages to make a few telephone calls, both on the road to and from Barton's home. Barton's behaviour switches between extreme violence and interludes of self-delusion. Billy finds his way into Barton's dungeon, his "black room", and discovers the remains of many other young boys. Billy's father beats the police to Billy's location, just barely preventing Barton from torturing and killing him.

== Reception ==
Critical reception for Billy was mostly positive, with the Atlanta Journal praising the novel but the Chicago Sun-Times panning it, saying Streiber failed to "walk the fine tricky line between fiction about monsters and monstrous fiction.". Entertainment Weekly gave an ambivalent review, rating it a "C" and stating that "For those who like this sort of thing, this is the sort of thing they will like". The Dallas Morning News called the book "chillingly real", Newsday stated that Barton was "the most repulsive villain to appear in a popular novel in a long time". The Sun Sentinel also praised Billy, citing the book's realism as a highlight.

== See also ==
- Pedophilia
