= Karen Goulekas =

- Occupation: Visual Effects Artist

Karen Goulekas is a visual effects artist.

Goulekas jointly won two Emmy Awards for her work covering the 1992 Summer Olympics. She has jointly won the BAFTA Award for Best Special Visual Effects twice, for The Fifth Element in 1998 and The Day After Tomorrow in 2005. She jointly won the Saturn Award for Best Special Effects in 1998 for the film Godzilla, and jointly won the Best Single Visual Effect of the Year at the 3rd annual Visual Effects Society Awards for the tidal wave in The Day After Tomorrow.

== Filmography ==
- Last Action Hero (1993)
- True lies (1994)
- Apollo 13 (1995)
- Strange Days (1995)
- T2 3-D: Battle Across Time (1996)
- The Fifth Element (1997)
- Titanic (1997)
- Godzilla (1998)
- Spider-Man (2002)
- Eight Legged Freaks (2002)
- The Day After Tomorrow (2004)
- Venom (2005)
- 10,000 BC (2008)
- Obsessed (2009)
- MacGruber (2010)
- Piranha 3D (2010)
- Green Lantern (2011)
- 30 Minutes or Less (2011)
- Seeking Justice (2011)
- Looper (2012)
- Bloodline (2013)
- Don Jon (2013)
- Last Knights (2015)
- Mohenjo Daro (2016)

== Bibliography ==
- Goulekas, Karen (2001). Visual Effects in A Digital World: A Comprehensive Glossary of Over 7000 Visual Effects Terms. Morgan Kaufmann Publishers. ISBN 978-0-1229-3785-9.
