= Communion (1989 film) =

1989 drama/thriller film directed by Philippe Mora

- Theatrical release poster
- Directed by: Philippe Mora
- Written by: Whitley Strieber
- Based on: Communion by Whitley Strieber
- Produced by: Philippe Mora
- Starring: Christopher Walken; Lindsay Crouse; Frances Sternhagen; Terry Hanauer; Andreas Katsulas; Joel Carlson
- Cinematography: Louis Irving
- Edited by: Lee Smith
- Music by: Eric Clapton; Allan Zavod
- Distributed by: New Line Cinema; Allied Vision
- Release date: November 10, 1989
- Running time: 105 minutes
- Country: United States
- Language: English
- Budget: $7 million
- Box office: $1.92 million

Communion is a 1989 American science fiction film directed by Philippe Mora and adapted by Whitley Strieber from his 1987 book.

Starring Christopher Walken and Frances Sternhagen, it tells a story of a family that experiences an extraterrestrial phenomenon while on vacation at a remote home in the wilderness during which the father Whitley Strieber is abducted and all of their lives change. According to Strieber, the story is a real-life account of his own encounter with "visitors", with Walken playing the role of Strieber.

== Plot ==
In 1985, New York–based author Whitley Strieber lives with his wife Anne and son Andrew in Manhattan and seems to be successful. However, he is awakened at night by paranoid dreams that someone else is in the room.

On a trip to the family cabin in the woods, the intruder alarm is triggered and Strieber sees a face watching him from the doorway. Bright light fills the cabin windows and wakes Andrew and two other family friends Alex and Sarah but Anne remains asleep.

Disturbed by this, the group returns to New York and life seemingly returns to normal, but Strieber finds that his work and personal life are becoming affected by recurring nightmares and visions of strange alien beings including greys, blue doctors and bugs. This upsets Andrew and puts strain on his marriage.

After an incident at their cabin in which Strieber is so convinced that there are alien beings inside the home that he pulls his gun out and almost shoots Anne, worried that Andrew is beginning to have the same visions, he is finally convinced to see psychiatrist Dr. Janet Duffy specializing in hypnotic regression therapy.

The therapy confirms that Strieber has possibly been abducted by unknown beings and experiments have been performed on him; however, he is still skeptical about it and reluctantly attends a group therapy session of fellow 'abductees'.

Eventually Strieber realizes he has to confront his visions, real or not, and returns to the cabin where most of the incidents seem to occur. He interacts with the alien beings and realizes he has been in contact with them his whole life and it was passed on from his father Karl and he will, in turn, pass it on to Andrew.

Making up with his family, Strieber comes to accept the alien visitors as part of his life and in the last scene he sits in his office and embraces the face of a 'grey' alien.

== Cast ==
- Christopher Walken as Whitley Strieber
  - Joshua Fromdahl as Young Whitley Strieber
- Lindsay Crouse as Anne Strieber
- Frances Sternhagen as Dr. Janet Duffy
- Terri Hanauer as Sarah
- Andreas Katsulas as Alex
- Joel Carlson as Andrew Strieber
- John Dennis Johnston as Fireman
- Dee Dee Rescher as Mrs. Greenberg
- Aileen Fitzpatrick as Kathleen Strieber
- R.J. Miller as Karl Strieber
- Holly Fields as Praying Mantis Girl
- Paula Shaw as Apartment Woman
- Juliet Sorci as Second Grader
- Joshua John Miller as Tall Boy
- Basil Hoffman as Dr. Sam Friedman

== Production ==
Communion was written by Whitley Strieber adapting his book of the same name, itself chronicling Strieber's alleged encounters with extraterrestrials. Strieber opted to work with director and friend Philippe Mora on adapting the story to film with the understanding Strieber would handle the writing without interference while Mora would handle direction without interference. Strieber chose to have the film produced independently as he feared having a major studio adapt his experiences would turn it into a special effects-heavy horror film rather than a character piece. During production it was reported that on set some members of the crew would crack jokes at Strieber's expense about the autobiographical aspects of the story. Strieber said of these instances:

Some people who work on movies are nice people; some people who work on movies are jerks. We had the usual mix on this crew.

The filmmakers later arranged special screenings of the film in several cities, including New York, San Diego, San Antonio and St. Louis, for alleged abductees.

== Reception ==
On Rotten Tomatoes, the film holds a 46% approval rating based on 13 reviews, with an average rating of 4.6/10.

Some critics praised Christopher Walken's performance as the highlight of the film. Los Angeles Times called his performance "terrific" and added: "Walken dazzles, giving us an intelligent, talented man caught in a nightmare and fearing for his sanity."

Strieber himself dismissed the film in an interview, noting the interpretation of events was too literal compared to his book. "[The film] probably overstates the case in terms of the way the beings look," he said. "They were very solid, but my glimpses of them were very brief; you see more of them in the movie than I think you should, and there was too much light on them."

== Music ==
The score was composed by Eric Clapton and Alan Clark, though no official soundtrack album was ever released. In 2010, the main theme and end credit theme were released by film composer and former Oingo Boingo guitarist Steve Bartek.
