= John Paul Thomas =

American painter (1927–2001)

- Born: John Paul Thomas; 4 February 1927; Bessemer, Alabama
- Died: 5 September 2001 (aged 74); Honolulu, Hawai'i, U.S.
- Education: New York University
- Known for: Painting
- Notable work: Homage to Gaea, Boy with Goldfish, Orchids of Hawaii, Hawaiian Legend series

John Paul Thomas (4 February 1927, Bessemer, Alabama – 5 September 2001, Honolulu, Hawai'i) was an American artist specializing in oil painting, watercolor and drawing in several media. He was also an educator and arts scholar.

== Life ==
John Paul Thomas was the third of four children born to Paul B. Thomas and Annie Watson Thomas. He enlisted in the U.S. Navy fall of 1944 and had a medical discharge the following summer. He received a BA degree in 1951 from The New School (for Social Research) and an MA degree in 1954 from New York University, where he studied with William Baziotes. He spent a year (1954-1955) in Rome, Italy studying Italian Renaissance painting. Upon returning to the U.S. he established his studio in Los Angeles (1956-1959), then San Francisco (1959-1963) and Marin County (1963-1970). He moved to the Kona District of Hawai'i Island in 1970 where he created artworks for thirty-one years until his death due to complications from myasthenia gravis. He is buried at the Kona Veterans Cemetery.

== Career ==
Thomas is among the foremost painters of Hawai'i. His work has been exhibited nationally and internationally in over 200 solo and group exhibitions in museums, universities and art galleries including one man shows at the Alan Gallery (Charles Alan formerly assisted Edith Halpert at the Downtown Gallery), New York (1958-1961); Paul Kantor Gallery, Beverly Hills, California (1956-1958); the Esther Robles Gallery, La Cienega Boulevard, Los Angeles (1958-1974); the Birmingham Museum of Art, Birmingham, Alabama (1954, 1964); University of Iowa, Iowa City (1963); Arizona State University, Tempe (1963); Oklahoma Art Center at the University of Oklahoma, Oklahoma City (1964); Colorado Springs Fine Arts Center, Colorado (1964); Rice University, Houston, Texas (1969); Foster Gallery, University of Wisconsin-Eau Claire (1976); and various sites throughout Hawai'i including the University of Hawai'i; Kaua'i Museum, Līhu'e, Kaua'i; Volcano Art Center; and the East Hawai'i Cultural Center. Group shows include the Kootz Gallery, New York (1950); Galleria Schneider, Rome (1955); Wichita Art Museum, Kansas (1957); Pacific Coast Biennial – Santa Barbara Museum of Art, San Francisco Legion of Honor, Portland Art Museum, Seattle Art Museum; University of Nebraska–Lincoln Annual, Lincoln, Nebraska; Whitney Museum of American Art Annual, New York; Annual Exhibitions, San Francisco Museum of Modern Art; Lee Nordness Gallery, New York; Tucson Arts Center, Arizona; Speed Art Museum, Louisville, Kentucky; Laguna Beach Art Association, California; Virginia Museum of Fine Arts, Richmond; Phoenix Art Museum, Arizona; Marin Museum, San Rafael, California; Occidental College, Los Angeles, California; Honolulu Academy of Arts (now Honolulu Museum of Art); and the American Library, Bucharest, Romania.

== Teaching ==
He began his teaching career at the Detroit Institute of Arts, Detroit, Michigan (1955-1956). He was Visiting Professor of Life Drawing at the University of Iowa, Iowa City (1962-1963) and taught at San Francisco State University Art Department (1964-1965). He then taught at the University of Hawai'i at Hilo (1965-1967) and University of Hawaiʻi at Mānoa School of Art in Honolulu (1966). He occupied the Ames Walker Professorship Chair in the School of Art at the University of Washington, Seattle (1968-1969).

== Awards and honors ==
Thomas received residence fellowships at Yaddo Foundation (1954) and Huntington Hartford Foundation, Pacific Palisades, Los Angeles, California (1957 and 1962), a National Endowment for the Arts grant (1975), and commissions from the Hawai'i State Foundation on Culture and the Arts and Delta Air Lines. The Hawai'i State Senate, Hawai'i State House of Representatives and the Hawai'i Island County Council have issued him commendations for his contributions to the culture of the Islands. The Hawai'i State Foundation on Culture and the Arts has purchased his work for the State Collection, and he has received commissions to create art for state buildings, most notably to create a memorial painting for the 150th anniversary of Washington Place, former home of Queen Lili'uokalani and governors of both the Territory and State of Hawai'i, now a National Historic Landmark.

== Significant series of paintings ==
Thomas often did series of paintings centering on one subject. The first significant series was on the subject of allegorical figures, reaching an early high point with the oil painting Triptych with Predella – the Seasons (1959) (collection of the Orange County Museum of Art), and continuing throughout his life culminating in the final large oil The Tempest (1997), a Hawaiian revisioning of the Giorgione la Tempesta. It included paintings of deities from Hawaiian mythology including Hina (goddess of the moon), Kamapua'a (pig demigod), and the volcano goddess Pele. His "Homage to Gaea", which occupied the last fifteen years of his life, combined bold color-shapes of tropical foliage with a technique of painting that reflected back to his abstract expressionist youth. His "Orchids of Hawai'i" watercolor series covers the entire time he lived in Kona and resulted in over two hundred paintings of numerous species of orchids, culminating in the triptych "Hilo Garden", 40 by 54 inches (1987).

His best-known series is Boy with Goldfish comprising seven large oil paintings with smaller oil studies and a suite of seventeen pencil drawings titled The Battle. This series inspired Hawaiian folk singing duo Leon Siu and Malia Elliott (Leon & Malia) to create a series of songs which were later developed into a large concert work for soloists, chorus, organ, and orchestra by composer Jerre Tanner. The Paintings and drawings were exhibited at The Contemporary Museum (now part of the Honolulu Museum of Art) as part of the Honolulu Symphony Orchestra's premiere of the music in October, 1976. The music was recorded in 1979 by the London Symphony Orchestra using then new Soundstream digital recording technology. Excerpts were released on Varèse Sarabande vinyl disc in 1980 and the complete work on Albany Records CD (1991) with Thomas paintings reproduced on the covers and in the booklets. The No. 1 painting "Rainbow Birth" was chosen for the cover of the Brubeck-LaVergne Trio jazz LP "See How It Feels".

== Scholarly studies ==
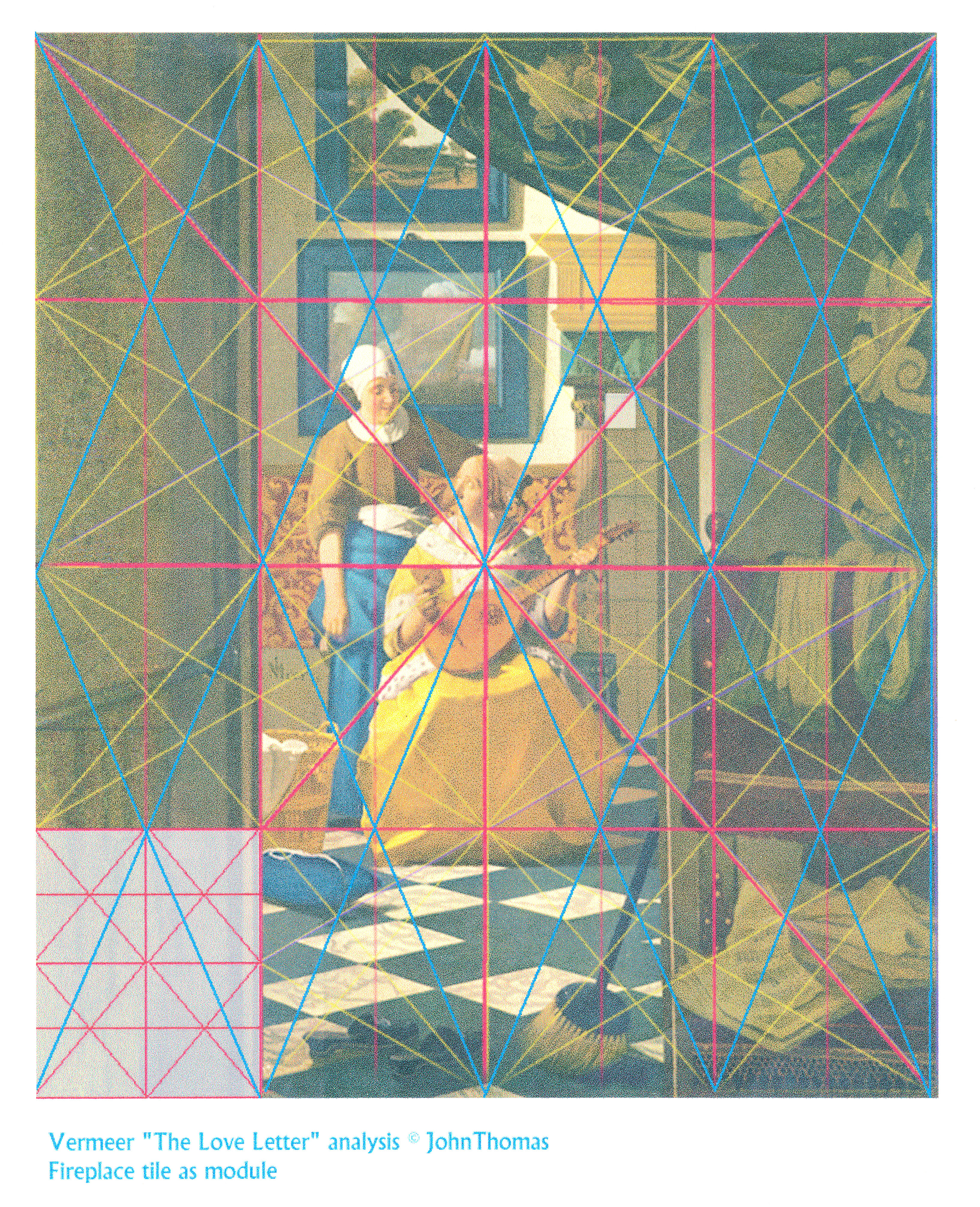
Thomas' analysis of Vermeer painting "The Love Letter" grid overlay #2 showing module and primary axes

Even though Thomas has early roots in Abstract Expressionism, through Baziotes at New York University, critics early on saw him as a maverick, unconcerned with contemporary trends in the arts environment. While his peers were throwing off the trappings of previous conventions, Thomas was developing a system of grids to control the interplay between the two-dimensional surface of a painting and a symbolic third dimension within. He traced the source of the grid concept to his early studies of Italian Renaissance painters and the architect Frank Lloyd Wright, several of whose students were friends. He named his personal application of the grid in the construction of his painting "Symbolic Stereometry". All his work from the end of his first year teaching at the University of Hawai'i at Hilo (1966) onward comes under the influence of the grid. Concurrently, his response to the quality of light in Hawai'i and tropical vegetation resulted in a parallel study of Color, particularly how the eye perceives color in relation to the colors surrounding it. Over forty years of studies on these two subjects are housed at Rod Library Special Collections, University of Northern Iowa, Cedar Falls, Iowa.

== Bibliography ==
- Life magazine; Fine Arts in the Market Place; New York September 19, 1960
- Hood, Mantle; Contribution to Hawaiian Music; Ha’ilono Mele, the Hawaiian Music Foundation Journal, vol. 11, no.8, pages 6 – 8; Honolulu, Hawai'i 1976
- Hess, Harvey; John Thomas, Artist of Kona; Aloha, the Magazine of Hawai'i; January/February 1980; Honolulu, Hawai'i
- Orchid Art and the Orchid Isle; orchid paintings and drawings; co-authored with poet Harvey Hess; Malama Arts, Honolulu, Hawai'i 1982 ISBN 0-931909-03-1
- Western’s World; cover; Western Airlines in-flight magazine; vol. 15, no. 8, August, 1984; Los Angeles, California
- Longman, Robin, ed.; cover; American Artist magazine annual travel issue; (1985) vol. 50, no. 512; New York City
- Hawai'i Island Artists and Friends of the Arts; cover art and article; volume I, Malama Arts, Honolulu, Hawai'i (1989) ISBN 0-931909-06-6; article volume II 1991 ISBN 0-931909-07-4; article volume III (1997) ISBN 0-931909-11-2
- Spirit of Aloha; cover; magazine, vol. 19, no. 2, February 1994; Honolulu, Hawai'i
- Tanner, Jerre; On the Origins and Application of the Grid in the Art of John Paul Thomas; private publication, Kailua-Kona, Hawai'i (2005); Publuu flip-book (2025)

== See also ==
- List of American artists 1900 and after
- List of artists who painted Hawaii and its people
- List of New York University alumni
