= The Forbidden Zone (novel) =

The Forbidden Zone is a 1993 science fiction horror novel by American writer Whitley Strieber, about an alien invasion by Lovecraftian monsters of a small American town.

== Reception ==
The reviewer for Kirkus Reviews opined that it is less subtle work than that of H. P. Lovecraft which inspired it, but still is a "genuinely scary [book], with plenty of scattered body parts for gorehound".

The book received several other reviews:

- Review by Linda Marotta in Fangoria, August 1993
- Review by Don D'Ammassa in Science Fiction Chronicle, no. 166, September 1993
- Review by Stefan Dziemianowicz in Crypt of Cthulhu, Hallowmas 1993
- Review by Mike Baker in Cemetery Dance, Fall 1993
- Review by Martin Brice in Vector, no. 178
- Review by Pete Crowther in Interzone, June 1994
- Review by Julie Atkin in Vector, no. 180
- Review by Izabela Szolc (1998) in Talizman #4-5 1998, p. 139 (in Polish)
