= Anne Strieber =

American novelist

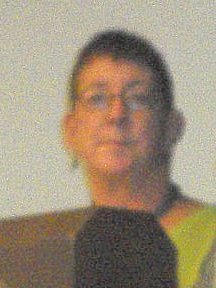
- Anne Strieber lecturing to Mutual UFO Network in 2012.
- Born: Anne Mattocks; August 25, 1946; San Antonio, Texas, U.S.
- Died: August 11, 2015 (aged 68); Santa Monica, California, U.S.
- Occupation: Writer/Novelist
- Spouse: Whitley Strieber
- Writing career
- Genre: Thriller novels
- Notable works: An Invisible Woman (2004); Little Town Lies (2005)

Anne Mattocks Strieber (August 25, 1946 – August 11, 2015) was an American author, known for her thrillers An Invisible Woman (2004) and Little Town Lies (2005).

== Biography ==
Before becoming a writer, she was a schoolteacher. She married fellow novelist, Whitley Strieber; they have one son, Andrew.

She was the managing editor of her husband's Web site, unknowncountry.com and was also a host of the Dreamland radio show podcast presented there.

She was portrayed by Lindsay Crouse in the film adaptation of her husband's nonfiction work Communion.

Anne Strieber died on August 11, 2015.
