= The Mekano Set =

English music collective

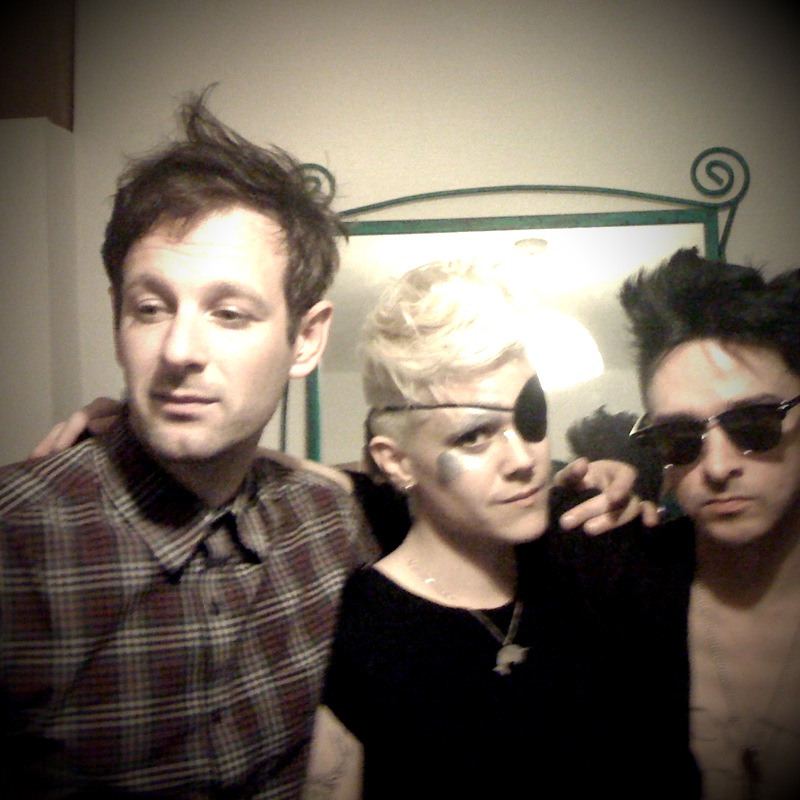

Background information
- Origin: England
- Genres: Electronic, shoegazing, noise rock, techno, post-punk, alternative rock
- Years active: 2007–present
- Labels: Elementary Recordings, Stray Recordings
- Members: Milk; Lee Christien; Justine Kay; Chucky Tsch; Arthur Hasburg; Nigel Barratt; Patrick Crean; Beth Rettig; Jewelly MePresents; Jezebel Halewood-Leagas
- Website: http://www.mekanoset.com

The Mekano Set is a music collective formed in 2007 by Milk (vocals, baritone guitar, programming), Nigel Barrett (guitar, synth, recorder), U Brown (DJ) and Beth Rettig (vocals, guitar).

The group's sound relies heavily upon bass, programmed beats and noise.

== History ==
The Mekano Set originally began as an informal collective of musicians and DJs improvising around programmed electronic beats. Initial recordings relied heavily on improvisation, and non-musical elements such as location recordings and found sounds. Early live performances avoided conventional venues in favour of squat parties and theater spaces. The group regularly perform as a trio but have appeared as a quintet.

=== Recordings ===
The group's songs are widely available online via iTunes, Spotify, Grooveshark and Amazon, and through various independent labels including Stray Recordings and Elementary Recordings.

== Influences ==
The group cite an eclectic list of influences including Curve, Talk Talk, Kate Bush, Hawkwind, The Chameleons, David Sylvian, Leftfield, Massive Attack, Joy Division, Public Image Limited, The Sisters of Mercy, The Clash, Depeche Mode, New Order, Gilles Peterson's Worldwide radio show, Twin Peaks, Whitley Strieber and Situationism.

The group's musical style is a combination of post-punk, dance music, shoegazing and breakbeat, with an emphasis on distinctive drum-beats, bass, heavily distorted and processed guitars and unconventional song-structures. The use of baritone vocals, minor keys and drum machines lends much of the group's material a dark, Alternative Rock sound.

The group also continue to cite The Fourth Way, Anarchist and Left Wing political movements as motivation and inspiration. Particularly Situationist and Syndicalist politics.
