= List of cult films: H =

This is a list of cult films organized alphabetically by name. See List of cult films for main list.

Film	Year	Director	Source
Habit	1997	Larry Fessenden	
Hail the Conquering Hero	1944	Preston Sturges	
La haine (also known as Hate)	1995	Mathieu Kassovitz	
The Hairdresser's Husband	1990	Patrice Leconte	
Hairspray	1988	John Waters	
Half Human	1955	Ishirō Honda	
Halloween	1978	John Carpenter	
Halloween: The Curse of Michael Myers	1995	Joe Chappelle	
Hallucination Generation	1967	Edward Mann	
The Hamster Factor and Other Tales of Twelve Monkeys	1996	Keith Fulton and Louis Pepe	
Hana-bi (also known as Fireworks)	1997	Takeshi Kitano	
The Hands of Orlac	1924	Robert Wiene	
Hands over the City	1963	Francesco Rosi	
Hangover Square	1945	John Brahm	
Hannah and Her Sisters	1986	Woody Allen	
Hannibal	2001	Ridley Scott	
Happiness	1998	Todd Solondz	
The Happiness Cage (also known as The Demon Within and The Mind Snatchers)	1972	Bernard Girard	
The Happiness of the Katakuris	2001	Takashi Miike	
Happy Together	1997	Wong Kar-wai	
Hard Boiled	1992	John Woo	
Hard Candy	2005	David Slade	
A Hard Day's Night	1964	Richard Lester	
Hard Times (also known as The Streetfighter)	1975	Walter Hill	
Hard to Be a God	2013	Aleksei Yuryevich German	
The Harder They Come	1972	Perry Henzell	
Harlis (also known as The Sensuous Three)	1972	Robert van Ackeren	
Harold & Kumar Escape from Guantanamo Bay	2008	Jon Hurwitz and Hayden Schlossberg	
Harold & Kumar Go to White Castle	2004	Jon Hurwitz and Hayden Schlossberg	
Harold and Maude	1971	Hal Ashby	
Harry Potter and the Chamber of Secrets	2002	Chris Columbus	
Harry Potter and the Philosopher's Stone	2001	Chris Columbus	
Harry Potter and the Prisoner of Azkaban	2004	Alfonso Cuarón	
Harum Scarum	1965	Gene Nelson	
Harvey	1950	Henry Koster	
Hated: GG Allin and the Murder Junkies	1993	Todd Phillips	
The Haunted and the Hunted (also known as Dementia 13)	1963	Francis Ford Coppola	
The Haunting	1963	Robert Wise	
The Hounds of Zaroff (also known as The Most Dangerous Game)	1932	Ernest B. Schoedsack and Irving Pichel	
Hausu (also known as House)	1977	Nobuhiko Obayashi	
The House That Cried Murder (also known as The Bride and Last House on Massacre Street)	1973	Jean-Marie Pélissié	
Honour Among Thieves (also known as Grisbi and Touchez pas au grisbi)	1954	Jacques Becker	
Havana	1990	Sydney Pollack	
Häxan (also known as Witchcraft Through the Ages)	1922	Benjamin Christensen	
He Knows You're Alone	1980	Armand Mastroianni	
He Ran All the Way	1951	John Berry	
Head	1968	Bob Rafelson	
Heart of Glass	1976	Werner Herzog	
Heat	1972	Paul Morrissey	
Heathers	1989	Michael Lehmann	
Heaven Knows, Mr. Allison	1957	John Huston	
Heaven's Gate	1980	Michael Cimino	
Heavy Metal	1981	Gerald Potterton	
Heavy Traffic	1973	Ralph Bakshi	
Hedwig and the Angry Inch	2001	John Cameron Mitchell	
Heimat	1984	Edgar Reitz	
Heist	2001	David Mamet	
Helen	2008	Joe Lawlor and Christine Molloy	
Hell Comes to Frogtown	1988	Donald G. Jackson and R. J. Kizer	
Hell of the Living Dead	1980	Bruno Mattei	
Hell's Angels	1930	Howard Hughes	
Hellboy II: The Golden Army	2008	Guillermo del Toro	
Heller in Pink Tights	1960	George Cukor	
Hellraiser	1987	Clive Barker	
Hells Angels on Wheels	1967	Richard Rush	
Hellzapoppin'	1941	H.C. Potter	
Help	1965	Richard Lester	
Henri-Georges Clouzot's Inferno	1964	Henri-Georges Clouzot	
Henry & June	1990	Philip Kaufman	
Henry: Portrait of a Serial Killer	1986	John McNaughton	
Hercules	1958	Pietro Francisci	
Hercules Against the Moon Men	1964	Giacomo Gentilomo	
Hero	2002	Zhang Yimou	
The Hidden Fortress	1958	Akira Kurosawa	
The Hideous Sun Demon	1958	Robert Clarke	
High Anxiety	1977	Mel Brooks	
High Art	1998	Lisa Cholodenko	
High Crime	1973	Enzo G. Castellari	
High Fidelity	2000	Stephen Frears	
High Noon	1952	Fred Zinnemann	
High Noon for Gangsters (also known as Greed in Broad Daylight)	1961	Kinji Fukasaku	
High Plains Drifter	1973	Clint Eastwood	
High School	1968	Frederick Wiseman	
High School Confidential	1958	Jack Arnold	
High Tension	2003	Alexandre Aja	
Highlander II: The Quickening	1991	Russell Mulcahy	
Hilary and Jackie	1998	Anand Tucker	
The Hill	1965	Sidney Lumet	
Hillbillys in a Haunted House	1967	Jean Yarbrough	
The Hills Have Eyes	1977	Wes Craven	
The Hired Hand	1971	Peter Fonda	
Hiroshima mon amour	1959	Alain Resnais	
His Girl Friday	1940	Howard Hawks	
Histoire d'O (also known as Story of O)	1975	Just Jaeckin	
The Hitch-Hiker	1953	Ida Lupino	
The Hitcher	1986	Robert Harmon	
Hitler: A Film from Germany (also known as Our Hitler)	1977	Hans-Jürgen Syberberg	
Holes	2003	Andrew Davis	
Holiday	1938	George Cukor	
The Holly and the Ivy	1952	George More O'Ferrall	
Hollywood Boulevard	1976	Allan Arkush and Joe Dante	
Hollywood Chainsaw Hookers	1988	Fred Olen Ray	
The Holy Mountain	1973	Alejandro Jodorowsky	
The Honeymoon Killers	1970	Leonard Kastle	
Hoop Dreams	1994	Steve James	
Horror Express	1972	Eugenio Martín	
The Horror of Death (also known as The Asphyx and Spirit of the Dead)	1972	Peter Newbrook	
Horrors of Malformed Men	1969	Teruo Ishii	
Horror of the Blood Monsters	1970	Al Adamson	
Horrors of the Black Museum	1959	Arthur Crabtree	
The Host	2006	Bong Joon-ho	
Hostel	2005	Eli Roth	
Hot Fuzz	2007	Edgar Wright	
The Hot Rock	1972	Peter Yates	
Hot Rod	2007	Akiva Schaffer	
Hotel Terminus: The Life and Times of Klaus Barbie	1988	Marcel Ophuls	
Hour of the Wolf	1968	Ingmar Bergman	
The Hours	2002	Stephen Daldry	
House (also known as Hausu)	1977	Nobuhiko Obayashi	
The House by the Cemetery	1981	Lucio Fulci	
House of 1000 Corpses	2003	Rob Zombie	
House of Games	1987	David Mamet	
House of Wax	1953	André de Toth	
House of Whipcord	1974	Pete Walker	
House on Haunted Hill	1959	William Castle	
The House on the Edge of the Park	1980	Ruggero Deodato	
The House That Dripped Blood	1971	Peter Duffell	
The House with Laughing Windows	1976	Pupi Avati	
How Much Wood Would a Woodchuck Chuck	1976	Werner Herzog	
The Howling	1981	Joe Dante	
Hudson Hawk	1991	Michael Lehmann	
The Hudsucker Proxy	1994	The Coen Brothers	
Hugo the Hippo	1975	William Feigenbaum	
Hum Aapke Hain Koun..!	1994	Sooraj Barjatya	
The Human Beast (also known as La Bête Humaine and Judas Was a Woman)	1938	Jean Renoir	
Human Traffic	1999	Justin Kerrigan	
Humanoids from the Deep	1980	Barbara Peeters	
Humpday	2009	Lynn Shelton	
The Hunchback of Notre Dame	1939	William Dieterle	
The Hunger	1983	Tony Scott	
The Hurt Locker	2008	Kathryn Bigelow	
Hush...Hush, Sweet Charlotte	1964	Robert Aldrich	
The Hustler	1961	Robert Rossen	
Hustler White	1996	Bruce LaBruce	
