= The Day After Tomorrow =

2004 American film by Roland Emmerich

- Theatrical release poster
- Directed by: Roland Emmerich
- Screenplay by: Roland Emmerich; Jeffrey Nachmanoff
- Story by: Roland Emmerich
- Based on: The Coming Global Superstorm by Art Bell and Whitley Strieber
- Produced by: Mark Gordon; Roland Emmerich
- Starring: Dennis Quaid; Jake Gyllenhaal; Ian Holm; Emmy Rossum; Sela Ward
- Cinematography: Ueli Steiger
- Edited by: David Brenner
- Music by: Harald Kloser
- Production companies: Centropolis Entertainment; Lions Gate Films; The Mark Gordon Company
- Distributed by: 20th Century Fox
- Release dates: May 17, 2004 (Mexico City); May 28, 2004 (United States)
- Running time: 123 minutes
- Country: United States
- Language: English
- Budget: $125 million
- Box office: $552.6 million

The Day After Tomorrow is a 2004 American science fiction disaster film co-written, co-produced, and directed by Roland Emmerich. Based on the 1999 book The Coming Global Superstorm by Art Bell and Whitley Strieber, the film depicts catastrophic climatic effects following the disruption of the North Atlantic Ocean circulation, in which a series of extreme weather events usher in climate change and lead to a new ice age. The film stars Dennis Quaid, Jake Gyllenhaal, Sela Ward, Emmy Rossum, and Ian Holm.

Originally slated for release in the summer of 2003, The Day After Tomorrow premiered in Mexico City on May 17, 2004, and was theatrically released in the United States by 20th Century Fox on May 28. The film received mixed reviews from critics and was a commercial success, grossing $552 million worldwide against a production budget of $125 million, becoming the sixth-highest-grossing film of 2004.

== Plot ==
Jack Hall, a paleoclimatologist for NOAA, drills for ice core samples in the Larsen Ice Shelf alongside his colleagues, Frank and Jason. A massive section of the ice shelf suddenly splits away, but they manage to narrowly escape.

At a United Nations conference on global warming in New Delhi, Jack shares his theory that climate change could trigger a new ice age by disrupting the North Atlantic Current. United States Vice President Raymond Becker is dismissive of Jack's research, but Professor Terry Rapson, a Scottish oceanographer, befriends him over their shared concerns.

Tokyo is struck by a giant hailstorm, and astronauts on the International Space Station spot three gigantic superstorms above Canada, Europe, and Siberia. Rapson's team notices severe temperature drops in the North Atlantic, providing evidence that Jack's theory may already be coming true. Meanwhile, the remnants of a hurricane spawn a destructive tornado outbreak across the Los Angeles Basin. Three helicopters sent to rescue the British royal family in Scotland crash after flying through the eye of the European superstorm.

Jack and Rapson's teams build a forecast model predicting that the climate shift will occur within six to eight weeks, though they later revise this estimate to just seven to ten days. Rapson shares with Jack that super-cooled air siphoned from the upper troposphere will flash-freeze anything caught in the eye of the storm. These cyclones reach temperatures below −150 degrees Fahrenheit (−101 degrees Celsius), which is what caused the royal family's helicopter crashes.

In New York City, Jack's son Sam participates in an academic decathlon with his friends Brian and Laura, where they also befriend JD. The North American superstorm causes massive flooding, halting all transportation. While helping rescue two French-speaking tourists, Laura cuts her leg. A massive storm surge inundates the city, forcing Sam's group to seek shelter at the New York Public Library. Sam contacts Jack and his mother, Lucy, through a working payphone. Jack warns Sam of the impending superstorm and promises to rescue him. Meanwhile, Rapson and his team succumb to the European storm. Lucy, a pediatrician, remains in her hospital to care for bedridden patients until authorities eventually rescue them.

Following Jack's suggestion, President Blake orders the populations of the southern states to evacuate to Mexico, while instructing those in the northern areas to shelter in place. Jack, Jason, and Frank depart on snowshoes for New York City. While they are trekking across Pennsylvania, Frank falls through a snow-covered mall skylight, saved only by his tether to Jack and Jason. As the glass cracks further, he sacrifices himself by cutting the rope. In Mexico, Becker learns that Blake's motorcade perished in the superstorm and that he is now the President.

Laura develops sepsis from her injury, leading Sam, Brian, and JD to scour a stranded Russian cargo ship for medical supplies after it drifts into the city. After finding penicillin, they encounter a pack of wolves that escaped from the Central Park Zoo. The boys fight off the wolves and return to the library just before the eye of the North American superstorm passes over, flash-freezing Manhattan. Meanwhile, Jack and Jason narrowly escape the storm by taking shelter in an abandoned restaurant.

Days later, the superstorms dissipate. Jack and Jason reach the library, finding Sam's group alive. Jack radios US forces, who arrive by helicopter. During the evacuation, other survivor groups emerge. In his first address as president, Becker apologizes for his ignorance and shares the news of the New York survivors and further rescue missions underway. On the International Space Station, astronauts look down in awe at the ice sheets covering much of the Northern Hemisphere and remark that the air has never looked so clear.

== Cast ==
- Dennis Quaid as Jack Hall, a NOAA paleoclimatologist
- Jake Gyllenhaal as Sam Hall, Jack's teenage son
- Sela Ward as Dr. Lucy Hall, a pediatrician who is Jack's wife and Sam's mother
- Emmy Rossum as Laura Chapman, a high school student and Sam's friend and love interest
- Ian Holm as Terry Rapson, a Scottish oceanographer of Scotland's Hedland Centre
- Arjay Smith as Brian Parks, a high school student and Sam and Laura's friend
- Austin Nichols as J.D., a preparatory school student of very wealthy parents who befriends Sam, Laura, and Brian
- Dash Mihok as Jason Evans, Jack's colleague
- Jay O. Sanders as Frank Harris, Jack's colleague
- Kenneth Welsh as Raymond Becker, the vice president of the United States
- Perry King as Richard Blake, the president of the United States
- Nestor Serrano as Tom Gomez, a NOAA administrator
- Tamlyn Tomita as Janet Tokada, a NASA meteorologist
- Glenn Plummer as Luther, a homeless New Yorker with a dog named "Buddha" who survives with Sam's group in the library
- Adrian Lester as Simon, Rapson's colleague.
- Richard McMillan as Dennis, Rapson's colleague
- Sasha Roiz as Parker, an ISS astronaut
- Christopher Britton as Vorsteen
- Amy Sloan as Elsa, a young woman and a survivor in Sam's group
- Sheila McCarthy as Judith, a librarian at the New York Public Library and a survivor in Sam's group
- Tom Rooney as Jeremy, a survivor in Sam's group who saves a 15th century Gutenberg Bible from being burned
- Christian Tessier as Aaron
- Mimi Kuzyk as the Secretary of State
- Chuck Shamata as Army General Pierce
- Rick Hoffman as Gary
- Jason Blicker as Paul
- Robin Wilcock as Tony
- Ayana O'Shun as Jama, a Senegalese woman traveling to New York with her daughter, Binata, and a survivor in Sam's group.
- Marylou Belugou as Binata, Jama's daughter, and a survivor in Sam's group

== Production ==
=== Development ===
The Day After Tomorrow was inspired by Coast to Coast AM talk-radio host Art Bell and Whitley Strieber's book, The Coming Global Superstorm, and Strieber wrote the film's novelization. Emmerich wrote a first draft of the script and showed it to producer Mark Gordon, who had produced Emmerich's film The Patriot. Nachmanoff came in to help with rewrites. On May 1, 2002, Creative Arts Agency held an auction, with a copy of the script being sent to all major studios along with a term sheet indicating a budget of $125 million, including $10 million for Emmerich against 10% of the gross. On May 3, 2002, 20th Century Fox made a distribution deal to make the film by putting it into pre-production straight away with production due to start in fall 2002, although it was believed that the budget could be kept to $100 million.

=== Filming ===
The Day After Tomorrow was filmed predominantly in Montreal and Toronto, with some footage also shot in New York City and Chiyoda, Tokyo. Filming ran from November 7, 2002, until October 18, 2003.

=== Visual effects ===
The Day After Tomorrow features 416 visual effects shots, with nine effects houses, notably Industrial Light & Magic (ILM), and Digital Domain, and over 1,000 artists, working on the film for over a year.

Although a miniature set was initially considered according to the behind-the-scenes documentary, for the destruction of New York, effects artists instead utilized a 13-block-sized, LIDAR-scanned 3D model of Manhattan, with over 50,000 scanned photographs used for building textures. Due to its overall complexity and a tight schedule, the storm surge scene required as many as three special effects vendors for certain shots, with the digital water created by either Digital Domain or small effects house Tweak Films, depending on the shot. Miniatures were employed for a later underwater scene in which a city bus is crushed under the bulbous bow of an abandoned Russian tanker ship that had drifted inland.

Similarly, the opening flyover of Antarctica was also CGI, created by digitally scanning miniature iceberg models created out of sculpted styrofoam; the falling pieces of ice as the shelf cracks were entirely hand-animated. Running for approximately two and a half minutes in length, the scene was at the time the longest continuous all-CGI shot in film history, surpassing the space zoom-out from the opening of Contact (1997).

== Music ==
=== Soundtrack ===
The Day After Tomorrow (Original Motion Picture Soundtrack)

Soundtrack album by Harald Kloser
- Released: May 18, 2004
- Genre: Soundtrack
- Length: 38:18
- Labels: Varèse Sarabande; Fox Music
- Producer: Various Artists

Harald Kloser chronology
| Rudy: The Rudy Giuliani Story (2004) | The Day After Tomorrow (Original Motion Picture Soundtrack) (2004) | Alien vs. Predator (soundtrack) (2004) |

The film's score was composed by Harald Kloser as his first collaboration with director Roland Emmerich. The Japanese dub has an exclusive theme song called "More Than a Million Miles" by a band coincidentally called Day After Tomorrow. The soundtrack of the film was released by Fox Music and Varèse Sarabande on May 18, 2004.

== Release ==
The film had its world premiere in Mexico City on May 17, 2004. It was released to theaters in the United States on May 28, 2004.

=== Home media ===
The film was released on VHS and DVD by 20th Century Fox Home Entertainment on October 12, 2004, and was released in high-definition video on Blu-ray in North America on October 2, 2007, and in the United Kingdom on April 28, 2008, in 1080p with a lossless DTS-HD Master Audio track and few bonus features. DVD sales were $110 million, bringing the film's gross to $652,771,772. It became available to stream on Disney+ in 2022 in an effort to show mature-themed films, just three years after the film's distributor made its purchase from Disney by Rupert Murdoch himself.

== Reception ==
=== Box office ===
The film came in second at the US box office behind Shrek 2 over its four-day Memorial Day opening and grossed $85,807,341. It led the per-theater average, with a four-day average of $25,053 (compared to Shrek 2's four-day average of $22,633). At the end of its theatrical run, the film had grossed $186,740,799 domestically and $552,639,571 worldwide.

For twenty years, it would hold the record for having the highest opening weekend for a natural disaster film until 2024 when it was dethroned by Twisters. Also for twenty-two years, it was the highest grossing film for a domestic release to never open at number one on opening weekend until it was surpassed by Obsession. Finally in general, it was the highest opening-weekend film not to lead at the box office until 2015's Inside Out.

=== Critical response ===
On Rotten Tomatoes, 46% of 219 critics gave the film a positive review, with an average rating of 5.5/10. The website's critics consensus reads: "The Day After Tomorrow is a ludicrous popcorn thriller filled with clunky dialogue, but spectacular visuals save it from being a total disaster." On Metacritic, the film has a weighted average score of 47 out of 100 based on 38 critics, indicating "mixed or average reviews". Audiences surveyed by CinemaScore gave the film an average grade "B" on an A+ to F scale.

Roger Ebert of the Chicago Sun-Times described the film as "profoundly silly", but nonetheless said the film was effective and praised the special effects. He gave it three stars out of four. Mark Caro of the Chicago Tribune wrote a completely negative review which considered the film unworthy of publicity for the climate change debate it had created.

=== Accolades ===
| Award | Subject | Nominee(s) | Result |
|---|---|---|---|
| Saturn Awards | Best Science Fiction Film | The Day After Tomorrow | Nominated |
| Saturn Awards | Best Special Effects | Karen E. Goulekas, Neil Corbould, Greg Strause and Remo Balcells | Nominated |
| BAFTA Awards | Best Special Visual Effects | Karen E. Goulekas, Neil Corbould, Greg Strause and Remo Balcells | Won |
| VES Awards | Outstanding Visual Effects in an Effects Driven Motion Picture | Karen Goulekas, Mike Chambers, Greg Strause, Remo Balcells | Nominated |
| VES Awards | Best Single Visual Effect | Karen Goulekas, Mike Chambers, Chris Horvath, Matthew Butler | Won |
| MTV Movie Awards | Best Action Sequence | "The destruction of Los Angeles" | Won |
| MTV Movie Awards | Best Breakthrough Performance | Emmy Rossum | Nominated |
| Irish Film & Television Awards | Best International Actor | Jake Gyllenhaal | Nominated |
| Golden Trailer Awards | Best Action Film | The Day After Tomorrow | Nominated |
| Environmental Media Awards | Best Film | The Day After Tomorrow | Won |
| BMI Film Awards | Best Music | Harald Kloser | Won |
| Golden Reel Awards | Best Sound Editing – Effects & Foley | Mark P. Stoeckinger, Larry Kemp, Glenn T. Morgan, Alan Rankin, Michael Kamper, Ann Scibelli, Randy Kelley, Harry Cohen, Bob Beher and Craig S. Jaeger | Nominated |

== Political and scientific criticism ==
Emmerich did not deny that his casting of a weak president and the resemblance of Kenneth Welsh to Vice President Dick Cheney were intended to criticize the climate change policy of the George W. Bush administration. Responding to claims of insensitivity in his inclusion of scenes of a devastated New York City less than three years after the September 11 attacks, Emmerich said that it was necessary to showcase the increased unity of people in the face of disaster because of the attacks.

Some scientists criticized the film's scientific aspects. Paleoclimatologist and professor of earth and planetary science at Harvard University Daniel P. Schrag said, "On the one hand, I'm glad that there's a big-budget movie about something as critical as climate change. On the other, I'm concerned that people will see these over-the-top effects and think the whole thing is a joke ... We are indeed experimenting with the Earth in a way that hasn't been done for millions of years. But you're not going to see another ice age – at least not like that." J. Marshall Shepherd, a research meteorologist at the NASA Goddard Space Flight Center, expressed a similar sentiment: "I'm heartened that there's a movie addressing real climate issues. But as for the science of the movie, I'd give it a D minus or an F. And I'd be concerned if the movie was made to advance a political agenda." According to University of Victoria climatologist Andrew Weaver, "It's The Towering Inferno of climate science movies, but I'm not losing any sleep over a new ice age, because it's impossible."

Patrick J. Michaels, a former research professor of environmental science at the University of Virginia, fellow at the Cato Institute and expert witness for Western Fuels Association who rejected the scientific consensus on global warming, called the film "propaganda" in a USA Today editorial: "As a scientist, I bristle when lies dressed up as 'science' are used to influence political discourse." College instructor and retired NASA Office of Inspector General senior special agent with no academic titles in the field Joseph Gutheinz called The Day After Tomorrow "a cheap thrill ride, which many weak-minded people will jump on and stay on for the rest of their lives" in a Space Daily editorial.

Stefan Rahmstorf of the Potsdam Institute for Climate Impact Research, an expert on thermohaline circulation and its effect on climate, said after a talk with scriptwriter Jeffrey Nachmanoff at the film's Berlin preview:

Clearly this is a disaster movie and not a scientific documentary, [and] the film makers have taken a lot of artistic license. But the film presents an opportunity to explain that some of the basic background is right: humans are indeed increasingly changing the climate and this is quite a dangerous experiment, including some risk of abrupt and unforeseen changes ... Luckily it is extremely unlikely that we will see major ocean circulation changes in the next couple of decades (I'd be just as surprised as Jack Hall if they did occur); at least most scientists think this will only become a more serious risk towards the end of the century. And the consequences would certainly not be as dramatic as the 'superstorm' depicted in the movie. Nevertheless, a major change in ocean circulation is a risk with serious and partly unpredictable consequences, which we should avoid. And even without events like ocean circulation changes, climate change is serious enough to demand decisive action.

Environmental activist and Guardian columnist George Monbiot called The Day After Tomorrow "a great movie and lousy science".

In 2008, Yahoo! Movies listed The Day After Tomorrow as one of its top-10 scientifically inaccurate films. It was criticized for depicting meteorological phenomena as occurring over the course of hours, instead of decades or centuries. A 2015 Washington Post article reported on a paper published in Scientific Reports which indicated that global temperatures could drop relatively rapidly (one degree Fahrenheit change or 0.5 degrees Celsius change over an 11-year period) due to a temporary shutdown of the Atlantic meridional overturning circulation caused by global warming.

== Potential sequel ==
In July 2024, Emmerich revealed that a script for a planned "spiritual sequel", titled Exodus, was being worked on.

== See also ==
- 2012 – a 2009 disaster film also by Emmerich
- Geostorm – a 2017 film with a similar premise from Emmerich's longtime collaborator Dean Devlin
