= Woodstock Revisited =

- Directed by: David McDonald
- Release date: 2009
- Country: United States
- Language: English

Woodstock Revisited is a 2009 documentary film by David McDonald that tells the story of how the countercultural movement associated with The Woodstock Festival came into being.

While the Woodstock Festival did not end up happening in the town for which it was named, Woodstock, New York, it wouldn't have transpired had it not been for a series of historical events in Woodstock that influenced the rise of the American counterculture.

Bob Dylan moved to Woodstock in 1964, and The Band following Dylan to town. A series of concerts on a field outside of Woodstock in 1966, 1967, and 1968 called The Woodstock Soundouts featured many of the same artists later to be involved with the larger-scale Woodstock Festival. In the years prior to the Woodstock Festival, musicians such as Jimi Hendrix, The Mothers of Invention, and Van Morrison all were residents of Woodstock.

The historical line McDonald draws between the events of the sixties and those that happened long before that show that the Woodstock Festival wasn't a historical anomaly, but instead the culmination of a hundred years worth of developments, beginning with Thoreau’s sojourn at Walden Pond, the mysticism of The Catskill Mountain Painters, and the two arts colonies, Byrdcliffe Colony and The Maverick, which christened the town’s reputation as a colony of the arts.

McDonald’s lyrical segments on Byrdcliffe and The Maverick kick off the film and frame the events and characters that would come later in a historical context. Byrdcliffe was founded in 1902 by Ralph Whitehead, an industrialist’s son who came from England to create a back-to-the land paradise in Woodstock devoted to the arts and creativity. The Maverick was an offshoot of Byrdcliffe founded by Herve(y) White, and became known for their wild outdoor festivals of the teens and 20s which had a huge influence on the various Woodstock Festivals that were to come later.

Woodstock Revisited has appeared in several festivals around the world and was mentioned in a 2009 article in The New York Times and The Woodstock Times. Beginning in the fall of 2009, McDonald lined up a slate of film screenings in and around the New York area. David McDonald later filmed a TV pilot for a series called The Mystery of Creativity, about the connections between creativity and spirituality.
