= Whitley Strieber =

American writer (born 1945)

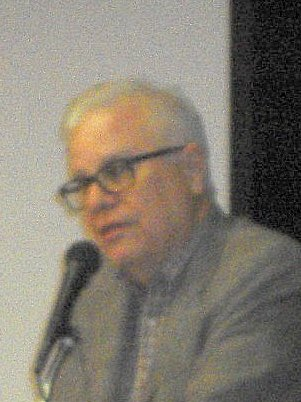
- Strieber in 2012
- Born: Louis Whitley Strieber; June 13, 1945 (age 81); San Antonio, Texas, U.S.
- Occupation: Writer/novelist
- Spouse: Anne Strieber
- Writing career
- Period: 1978–present
- Genres: Social science fiction, ufology, horror novels
- Notable works: The Wolfen (1978); The Hunger (1981); Communion (1987)
- Website: www.unknowncountry.com

Louis Whitley Strieber (/ˈstriːbər/; born June 13, 1945) is an American writer best known for his horror novels The Wolfen and The Hunger and for Communion, a non-fiction account of his alleged experiences with non-human entities. He has maintained a dual career as an author of fiction and advocate of metaphysical concepts through his best-selling non-fiction books, his Unknown Country website, and his podcast, Dreamland.

== Early life and education ==
Strieber was born in San Antonio, Texas, the son of Kathleen Mary (Drought) and Karl Strieber, a lawyer. He attended Central Catholic High School in San Antonio. He was educated at the University of Texas at Austin and the London School of Film Technique, graduating from each in 1968. He worked for several advertising firms in New York City, rising to the level of vice president before leaving in 1977 to pursue a writing career.

== Early fiction ==
Strieber began his career as a novelist with the horror novels The Wolfen (1978) and The Hunger (1981), both of which were made into feature films, followed by the less successful horror novels Black Magic (1982) and The Night Church (1983).

Strieber turned to speculative fiction with social conscience. Collaborating with James Kunetka, he wrote Warday (1984) about the dangers of limited nuclear warfare, and Nature's End (1986), a novel about an environmental apocalypse. He independently authored Wolf of Shadows (1985), a young adult novel set in the aftermath of a nuclear war.

In 1986, Strieber's fantasy novel Catmagic was published with co-authorship credited to Jonathan Barry, who was described as an aerospace industry consultant and a practicing witch. In the 1987 paperback edition, Strieber stated that Barry was fictitious and that he was the sole author of Catmagic. Strieber's personal publishing company, Walker & Collier, was named after two characters in Catmagic.

Strieber later authored Billy (1990), The Wild (1991), Unholy Fire (1992), and The Forbidden Zone (1993), which were less successful.

== Short stories ==
The author's short stories were collected in the 1997 limited-edition volume Evenings with Demons. More recent short stories included "The Good Neighbor", published in Twilight Zone: 19 Original Stories on the 50th Anniversary, and "The Christmas Spirits" (2012), a modern retelling of Charles Dickens's A Christmas Carol.

== Communion and "the visitors" ==
Strieber has stated that he was abducted from his cabin in upstate New York on the evening of December 26, 1985, by non-human sentient beings. He wrote about this and related experiences in Communion (1987), his first non-fiction book. Although the book was perceived generally as an account of alien abduction, Strieber drew no conclusions about the identity of the alleged abductors. He referred to the beings as "the visitors", a name chosen to be as neutral as possible to allow the possibility that they were not extraterrestrials. Neurologist Steven Novella has remarked that the details of Whitley's tale of waking up seemingly paralyzed correlated with aspects of hypnagogia, a fairly common neurological phenomenon that has been mistaken by some for an intervention by demons or aliens. Both the hardcover and paperback editions of Communion reached the number one position on The New York Times Best Seller list (non-fiction), with more than 2 million copies collectively sold.

Although it was published as nonfiction, the book editor of the Los Angeles Times pronounced the follow-up title, Transformation (1988), to be fiction and removed it from the non-fiction best-seller list (it nonetheless made the top 10 on the fiction side of the chart). "It's a reprehensible thing," Strieber responded. "My book is a true story ... Placing this book on the fiction list is an ugly example of exactly the kind of blind prejudice that has hurt human progress for many generations." Criticism that noted the similarity between the non-human beings in Strieber's autobiographical accounts and the non-human beings in his initial horror novels was acknowledged by the author as a fair observation, but not indicative of his autobiographical works being fictional. He said, "The mysterious small beings that figure prominently in Catmagic seem to be an unconscious rendering of [the visitors], created before I was aware that they may be real."

Since the 1987 publication of Communion, Strieber has written four further autobiographies detailing his experiences with the visitors: Transformation (1988), a direct follow-up; Breakthrough: The Next Step (1995), a reflection on the original events and accounts of the sporadic contact he had subsequently experienced; The Secret School (1996), in which he examined strange memories from his childhood; and Solving the Communion Enigma: What Is to Come (2011).

In Solving the Communion Enigma, Strieber reflected on how advances in scientific understanding since his 1987 publication could shed light on what he perceived, noting, "Among other things, since I wrote Communion, science has determined that parallel universes may be physically real and that time travel may in some way be possible." The book was a consolidation of UFO sightings and related phenomena, including crop circles, alien abductions, mutilations and deaths, in an attempt to discern a meaningful overall pattern. Strieber concluded that the human species was being shepherded to a higher level of understanding and existence within an endless "multiverse" of matter, energy, space, and time. He also wrote more candidly about the deleterious effects his initial experiences had upon him while staying at his upstate New York cabin in the 1980s, recalling, "I was regularly drinking myself to sleep when we were there. I would listen to the radio until late hours, drinking vodka..."

Other visitor-themed books of Strieber's included Majestic (1989), a novel about the Roswell UFO incident; The Communion Letters (1997, reissued in 2003), a collection of letters from readers reporting experiences similar to Strieber's; Confirmation (1998), in which Strieber reviewed a variety of evidence suggestive of alien contact and considered what more would be required to provide "confirmation"; The Grays (2006), a novel in which his impressions of alien contact were presented through a fictional thriller/espionage narrative; and Hybrids (2011), a fictional narrative that imagined human/alien hybrids being born into the modern world.

Additional visitor-themed writings included a screenplay for the 1989 film Communion, directed by Philippe Mora and starring Christopher Walken as Strieber. The movie covered material from the books Communion and Transformation. Strieber has stated that he was dissatisfied with the film, which included scenes of improvised dialogue and themes not present in his books. Strieber also wrote a screenplay for his novel Majestic, which to date has not been filmed.

Strieber has repeatedly expressed frustration that his experiences have been taken as "alien contact" when he did not actually know what they were. He has reported anomalous childhood experiences and suggested that he may have suffered some sort of early interference by intelligence or military agencies. Skeptic Philip J. Klass suggested in his 1988 book UFO Abductions: A Dangerous Game that Strieber was too quick to dismiss psychiatrist Donald Klein's suggestion that temporal lobe epilepsy might be the cause of his purported encounters. Strieber later stated that he subsequently elected to undergo testing for temporal lobe epilepsy and other brain abnormalities, but stated that no anomalies were discovered. Klein offered further specifics, explaining that Strieber had asked him to test for psychosis and temporal lobe epilepsy; the results were reportedly negative for the former and, even though the latter couldn't be absolutely ruled out, the likelihood was deemed low.

== The Whitman Massacre ==
In Communion, Strieber wrote of having told friends over the years that he had witnessed the University of Texas tower shooting in Austin, Texas, on August 1, 1966, when he had in fact not been on campus that day:

For years I have told of being present at the University of Texas when Charles Whitman went on his shooting spree from the tower in 1966. But I wasn't there.... For years I have explained my sudden departure by saying that I couldn't stand the place after the Charles Whitman sniper incident. The truth was, I could have remained after that incident. It was my secret terror that drove me away.

Strieber presents his claim to have witnessed the Whitman shooting in Communion in the context of alien abduction screen memories, expressing puzzlement at having repeated this false claim over the years. In two interviews prior to Communion, however, Strieber described in graphic detail what he purportedly witnessed. In a 1985 interview with Douglas Winter published in Faces of Fear, Strieber described:

I had just had a Coke. I was walking from the student union to the academic center, which was an open-shelf library near the Tower, when I heard a sharp bang that echoed off the University co-op across the street behind me. And the reason I am alive today is that I didn't turn around. I thought it was coming from the Tower. Maybe I saw some movement out of the corner of my eye. All the people in front of me thought the sound came from the co-op in front of us, not the Tower behind.

The next thing I saw was a little boy on a bicycle coming toward me—his head just exploded. I didn't hear that one. I knew then that it was coming from the Tower. The other people all took cover that shielded them from the co-op, but left them exposed to the Tower. They were all killed, shot. I ran to a little retaining wall about three feet high which was near the base of the Tower building, about twenty yards from it. And I laid down there.

He shot two girls in the stomach right behind me, thirty feet away from me. And they were lying there in the grass, screaming, begging, pleading for help, trying to crawl along. One girl's legs wouldn't work. The other one was vomiting pieces of herself out of her mouth. And I could smell the blood and the odor of their stomachs, what was in their stomachs and their colons. The smell was horrible coming out of these poor kids, two young coeds. And he did that to get me and this other guy who was hiding behind this embankment to come out. I stayed there. I was sick with dread, watching them die, knowing that that gun was waiting. And the other guy suddenly went out and tried to pull one of them away and got shot in the head and killed. Whitman just shot the top of his head off.

I stayed right where I was for a long, long time—until I saw them, with my own eyes, bringing Whitman's body out. The ambulance men came up to me and said, "You can come out now, he's dead." But I would not move until I saw him.

Critics including panelists on the British television discussion program After Dark questioned Strieber about his statements in Communion about not having been at the Whitman shooting. Strieber announced that in his latest book, Transformation, he had changed his mind and decided he had witnessed the shooting. Despite this, according to public information, no "little boy on a bicycle" was killed by Whitman that day, although a 17-year-old male riding a bicycle was non-fatally shot near the West Mall entrance. Further, according to Ed Conroy in his Report on Communion, Strieber's mother stated during an interview that Strieber had been in Austin the day of the shooting, but not on campus.

== The Master of the Key ==
In 2001, Strieber self-published a book titled The Key, in which he claimed that while on a book tour for his book Confirmation, he was visited in the early morning of June 6, 1998, at his Toronto hotel room by an unknown man who presented him with a "new image of God". Strieber engaged the man in dialogue for "half an hour", though Strieber also conceded that "once our conversation was transcribed, it became obvious that more time was involved" and "he must have been with me for at least two hours". Subjects discussed included the Holocaust, sudden climate change, the afterlife, psychic ability, UFOs, and using the human soul in machines. According to Strieber, the man did not give his name, and Strieber refers to him as "Master of the Key" in the book. While he was writing the book, Strieber said that unlike other events he had experienced, "the reality of this one isn't in question."

In the section of The Key entitled The Conversation, Strieber presented a transcript of the conversation which Strieber has claimed is "80 to 90 percent accurate", "90% accurate or more". In 2011, Tarcher/Penguin printed a new edition of The Key, which contained significant differences from the version of the transcript contained in Strieber's original Walker & Collier edition. In response, Strieber alleged that his own 2001 self-published edition had been "censored" by "sinister forces".

== Current works ==
Whitley Strieber is currently the host of the spiritual and science-themed podcast Dreamland, available on a weekly basis from his website, Unknown Country. The program was a former companion show to Coast to Coast AM, with both shows having been founded by broadcaster Art Bell. Strieber began helming the show starting in 1998.

Strieber has also continued to write novels, including The Last Vampire (2001) and Lilith's Dream (2002), both sequels to his 1981 vampire novel The Hunger. He wrote 2012: The War For Souls (2007), a horror novel about an interdimensional invasion, and Critical Mass (2009), a thriller about nuclear terrorism. Strieber also co-authored the graphic novel The Nye Incidents (2008), along with co-writers Craig Spector and Guss Floor.

His novel The Omega Point is "based on a hidden connection between 2012 and the Book of Revelation". This title, released in 2010, is Strieber's second novel dealing with the subject of 2012, the first being 2012: The War for Souls.

An entry in the popular teen-lit genre, Melody Burning, was published in late 2011. The story centered on a feral teenager who lived within a skyrise unnoticed, and a new tenant, a pop star named Melody, with whom he fell in love.

In 2012, Strieber began an alien-themed thriller series called "Alien Hunter", the first volume of which was published in August 2013. A series based on the book was released by SyFy in April 2016 and called "Hunters". The second volume in the series, Alien Hunter: Underworld, was published in August 2014.

In March 2014, Strieber's wife Anne co-authored a book with her husband called Miraculous Journey, wherein she details a near-death experience following a cerebral hemorrhage in 2004 and her then-recent treatment for a brain tumor nearly a decade later.

Strieber collaborated with religious scholar Jeffrey J. Kripal on 2016's Super Natural: A New Vision of the Unexplained, a study of occultism, supernatural experiences, and parapsychology that explored "why the supernatural is neither fantasy nor fiction but a vital and authentic aspect of life".

In 2025, Strieber published The Fourth Mind, which explored the anatomy, genetics and abilities of benevolent entities who Strieber referred to as "the visitors," and proposed that they possessed capabilities such as telepathy, telekinesis, and levitation. Strieber suggested that humans may have once shared these abilities, which were lost in part after ancient global catastrophes. The book advocated rediscovering these powers in order to integrate with the visitors and reframe humanity's "cosmic identity". This thesis has been positively received by the likes of Jacques Vallée, Jim Semivan, and Uri Geller.

== Media appearances ==
In November 1989, Strieber made an extended appearance on the British television discussion programme After Dark alongside, among others, astronaut Buzz Aldrin.

The following year on February 4, 1990, Strieber made an appearance on Irish channel RTÉ's Kenny Live to discuss his experience of alien abduction.

Strieber, and perhaps his wife Anne, made a cameo appearance in the 2009 movie Race to Witch Mountain.

Television appearances during the publication of Communion were numerous and included The Tonight Show with Johnny Carson. He has made appearances (including a 2006 interview on the Late Late Show with Craig Ferguson) in support of his newer novels.

He has been featured many times on the overnight radio show Coast to Coast AM, both as guest and guest host. On April 6, 2013, he did a two-hour interview with John B. Wells.

Strieber appeared in the 2022 documentary Alien Abduction: Answers.

== Cultural influences ==
In an episode of The X-Files, "Jose Chung's From Outer Space", the cover of the book From Outer Space is a parody of the cover of Communion (the alien on the cover is smoking a cigarette).

The post-punk dance music group The Mekano Set cite Whitley Strieber's non-fiction as an influence on their work. They wrote a tribute to Strieber for their 2013 album The Three Thieves (a reference to characters from Strieber's novel The Grays) entitled "What is it Whit?"

The closing track of U.N.K.L.E.'s debut album Psyence Fiction (1998) features vocals from Whitley Strieber, taken from a weekend edition of Art Bell's Coast to Coast AM nightly radio talk show.

Communion was shown in the first-season episode "Love Language" of the television series Resident Alien.

== Archives of the Impossible ==
The Archives of the Impossible (AOTI) of Rice University at Houston, Texas, is a special collection founded in 2014 by Jeffrey J. Kripal, a professor of religion. AOTI is based at the Woodson Research Center (WRC) and materials are housed in the Fondren Library. AOTI houses mail correspondences that Strieber received from the public about their alien abduction reports. Kripal highlighted 3,400 letters to Strieber in particular; Strieber had received hundreds of thousands of letters that his wife Anne curated, and the particularly significant letters were donated to AOTI. Rice University in 2024 began a two-year study of the materials in AOTI, after ten years of collection and archival work. The research included artificial intelligence-driven analysis of the Strieber and other collections. Rice University began an extensive de-identification process for Mack's collection, to protect the identities of claimed experiencers in medical records. Similar data anonymization efforts were reported underway for the Strieber collection. The Strieber collection spans material from 1970 to 2016, and was accessioned to AOTI in 2023.

== Personal life ==
Whitley Strieber is associated with the Gurdjieff Foundation. He left regular work at the Foundation shortly before the experiences reported in Communion but remains involved in the mystical teachings of G. I. Gurdjieff and P. D. Ouspensky and makes frequent references to them in his non-fiction writings.

Strieber was married to Anne Strieber until her death in 2015. According to his website, he was living in California in April 2019.

== Fiction ==
- The Wolfen (1978)
- The Hunger (1981)
- Black Magic (1982)
- The Night Church (1983)
- Warday (1984) (with James Kunetka)
- Wolf of Shadows (1985)
- Nature’s End (1986) (with James Kunetka)
- Catmagic (1986)
- Majestic (1989)
- Billy (1990)
- The Wild (1991)
- Unholy Fire (1992)
- Horror Story (1992) (short)
- The Forbidden Zone (1993)
- Evenings With Demons (1997)
- The Last Vampire (2001)
- Lilith's Dream (2002)
- Father Bob and Bobby (2002) (short)
- The Day After Tomorrow (novelization) (2004)
- The Grays (2006)
- 2012: The War for Souls (2007)
- The Nye Incidents (2008) (with Craig Spector)
- Critical Mass (2009)
- The Omega Point: Beyond 2012 (2010)
- Hybrids (2011)
- Melody Burning (2011)
- Alien Hunter (2013)
- The Secret of Orenda (2013)
- Alien Hunter: Underworld (2014)
- Alien Hunter: The White House (2016)
- New (2018)
- In Hitler’s House Volume 1: What the Thunder Said (as Jonathan White Lane) (2018)
- In Hitler’s House Volume 2: Unreal (as Jonathan White Lane) (2018)

== Nonfiction ==
- Communion (1987)
- Transformation (1988)
- Breakthrough (1995)
- The Secret School (1996)
- The Communion Letters (1997) (with Anne Strieber (editors))
- Confirmation (1998)
- The Coming Global Superstorm (1999) (with Art Bell)
- The Key (2001)
- The Path (2002)
- Solving the Communion Enigma: What Is to Come (2011)
- Miraculous Journey (2014) (with Anne Strieber)
- Super Natural: A New Vision of the Unexplained (2016) (with Jeffrey J. Kripal)
- The Afterlife Revolution (2017) (with Anne Strieber)
- A New World (2019)
- Jesus: A New Vision (2020)
- Them (2023)
- The Fourth Mind (2025)
- Transformation 2026 (2026)

== Film and TV adaptations ==
- Wolfen (1981; Orion/Warner Bros.)
- The Hunger (1983; Metro-Goldwyn-Mayer)
- Communion (1989; New Line Cinema)
- The Day After Tomorrow (2004; 20th Century Fox/Lionsgate)
- Hunters (2016; SyFy)

== See also ==
- List of reported UFO sightings
- Unidentified flying object
