= The Wolfen =

Novel by Whitley Strieber

- Artwork for the hardcover first edition
- Author: Whitley Strieber
- Cover artist: Melvyn Grant (for 1992 UK Reissue)
- Language: English (U.S.)
- Genre: Horror
- Publisher: William Morrow & Co
- Publication date: 1978
- Publication place: United States of America
- Media type: Print (Paperback and Hardcover)
- Pages: 252
- ISBN: 0688033474
- OCLC: 3842774

The Wolfen (1978) is the debut novel of Whitley Strieber. It tells the story of two police detectives in New York City who are involved in the investigation of suspicious deaths across the city, which are revealed to be the work of a race of intelligent beings descended from canids, called the Wolfen. The novel is told from the point of view of the human characters as well from the Wolfen themselves.

A film adaptation directed by Michael Wadleigh and starring Albert Finney was released in 1981.

== Plot ==
The violent junk yard deaths of Hugo DiFalco and Dennis Houlihan from the NYPD Auto Squad trigger an investigation led by detectives Becky Neff and George Wilson. The evidence shows nothing conclusive, except that the victims were quickly and brutally attacked by an animal, in light of the gnawing marks on the bones and paw prints left on the mud near the attack. Although the murdered policemen were healthy, they seemed to be unable to defend themselves or fire their service firearms. In addition, the hand of one of the policemen, still holding his gun, was severed from his arm, having not had a chance to fire the weapon.

To the detectives' dismay, the Chief of Police, lacking a plausible explanation for the attack, has written into the official report that a pack of stray dogs attacked the policemen after becoming intoxicated with carbon monoxide, to avoid raising public concern in advance of upcoming elections. The detectives pay a visit to the medical examiner, Dr. Evans, who informs them that there were no knife marks, that the victims were eaten, and that unidentified canine fur, bites, and claw marks were found on the bodies.

Reluctant to leave the real cause of death of their colleagues unknown, Neff and Wilson decide to take some paw-print casts to Tom Rilker, a dog trainer, in an attempt to identify the breed of dogs that may have attacked the policemen, hypothesizing that someone might've trained, employed, and weaponized dogs. The conversation turns to the topic of corrupt policemen, including rumors of Dick Neff, Becky's husband – implying that he's receiving money from certain groups. Later on, it's learned that Dick accepted bribes from a gambling ring so that he could place his father, who has Parkinson's disease, in a nursing home that offers him proper care, rather than a state hospital.

During the search for a blind missing person, the police are led to an abandoned building, where they discover evidence of more bodies in differing states of decay. Neff and Wilson search the building, where Neff hears a baby's cries, and seeks to investigate, but is reluctantly convinced by Wilson to wait for police backup. The infant's cry, however, is revealed to be a lure by a pack of creatures living in the building, who react to the detectives' incursion by attempting to separate the two. After Neff declines to pursue the sound, she leaves with Wilson, who tells Neff that he wants to leave because he feels that they're being watched by something, a feeling similar to the reaction of an old buck before being taken down by a pack of wolves. Wilson also confesses to Neff that he has romantic feelings for her.

Neff and Wilson consult another expert, Dr. Carl Ferguson, who works at the Museum of Natural History and has also examined the paw-print casts. Ferguson observes the paws' resemblance to canine paws, except for longer fingers and claws, and concludes that they belong to a species not yet classified. Neff becomes concerned after developing the feeling, much as Wilson did, that someone observed her when she was near a window with a balcony, a location difficult to reach due to its height.

It's discovered that a pack of intelligent and savage canine creatures called the Wolfen are stalking the city. These predators are not werewolves, but are a separate race of intelligent beings descended from canids that live secretly alongside mankind. The Wolfen turned the decaying ghettos into their new feeding grounds, hunting the abandoned of humanity: the homeless, drug abusers, outcasts, and any people whom the Wolfen believe would not be missed. They also quickly kill anyone who learn of their existence.

Eventually, the Wolfen infiltrate a high-rise building and attack Wilson and Neff, who kill several of their number. The rest of the pack flees as reinforcements arrive for the two police officers. The carcasses of the slain Wolfen will prove their existence, and it's implied that something will be done about the revelation that humanity has a predator. Returning to their hideout, the Wolfen acknowledge their grim future, and let out a defiant howl answered by various other packs that begin to converge.

== Reception ==
Critical and scholarly reception for The Wolfen has been mostly positive. In their book Intersections, Professors Slusser and Rabkin comment that Strieber makes the supernatural an "explainable part of the real universe" and undercuts the fantastic to give a more scientific explanation. Don D'Ammassa praised the book form of Wolfen in his Encyclopedia of Fantasy and Horror Fiction, but commented that the film adaptation was "only intermittently loyal" to the novel.
