= Wolfen (film) =

1981 film by Michael Wadleigh

- Original 1981 film poster
- Directed by: Michael Wadleigh
- Screenplay by: David M. Eyre, Jr.; Michael Wadleigh; Uncredited: Eric Roth
- Story by: David M. Eyre, Jr.; Michael Wadleigh
- Based on: The Wolfen by Whitley Strieber
- Produced by: Rupert Hitzig
- Starring: Albert Finney; Diane Venora; Edward James Olmos; Gregory Hines; Tom Noonan
- Cinematography: Gerry Fisher
- Edited by: Marshall M. Borden; Martin J. Bram; Dennis Dolan; Chris Lebenzon
- Music by: James Horner
- Production company: Orion Pictures
- Distributed by: Warner Bros.
- Release date: July 24, 1981
- Running time: 114 minutes
- Country: United States
- Language: English
- Budget: $17 million
- Box office: $10.6 million

Wolfen is a 1981 American crime horror film directed by Michael Wadleigh in his second directorial feature film, based on Whitley Strieber's 1978 novel The Wolfen. It stars Albert Finney, Diane Venora, Gregory Hines and Edward James Olmos. The film follows city-cop Detective Dewey Wilson who has been assigned to uncover what is behind a series of vicious murders. Originally, it is believed the murders are animal attacks until Wilson discovers an indigenous legend about wolf-spirits.

== Plot ==
Former NYPD Captain Dewey Wilson is brought back to the force and assigned to solve a bizarre string of violent murders after high-profile magnate Christopher Van der Veer, his wife Pauline, and his bodyguard are slain in Battery Park. Executive Security, the private firm employed by Van der Veer, blames the murders on a group of left-wing anarchists, but knowing that Van der Veer's bodyguard was a 300-pound (140 kg) Haitian with voodoo-ties leads Wilson to doubt this theory because the bodyguard was torn apart with ruthless efficiency (the anarchists are mostly activist bomb-makers, not violent assassins). With pressure to solve the case coming from both the Police Commissioner and the Mayor, Wilson is partnered with criminal psychologist Rebecca Neff.

Elsewhere, in the South Bronx, a homeless man explores an abandoned church that is scheduled to be demolished by Van der Veer's development company. He is killed by an unseen monstrous being. Wilson and Neff investigate his murder. At the church, the apparent sounds of a baby crying lure Neff up to the bell tower. Wilson follows her, but does not hear the crying; once Neff is separated from him, then he hears a wolf's howl. He goes up after Neff and drags her to safety. Later that night, a bridge-worker is apparently murdered by the same creature.

Coroner Whittington discovers non-human hairs on several victims and consults a zoologist named Dr. Carl Ferguson, who identifies the hairs as belonging to an unknown subspecies of Canis lupus (wolf). Ferguson compares wolves to Native Americans in how they were both hunted to near extinction by colonizing imports. Inspired, Wilson finds Eddie Holt, a militant Native activist that he arrested some years previously, working in construction. While Wilson interrogates Holt on top of the Manhattan Bridge, Holt claims to be a shape-shifter, which implicates him as the killer. Wilson opts to leave Holt alone and tail him that night.

Following animal clues, Ferguson goes to Central Park, where a creature ambushes and kills him in a tunnel. Wilson spends the remainder of his night with Rebecca Neff and they have sex. The following morning, a man in a jogging suit rides Ferguson's motorcycle past Wilson as he leaves Neff's apartment.

Whittington and Wilson stake out the church, armed with sniper-rifles and sound-equipment; after Whittington almost blows his ears out by opening a beer can near a parabolic microphone, then comes an animal that appears to be a wolf and kills him. Meanwhile, Executive Security apprehends a terrorist-cell of the "Götterdämmerung", which is in connection with the slaying of Christopher Van der Veer.

A traumatized Wilson escapes the church and finds himself at the nearby Wigwam Bar, where Holt and his friends are drinking. The group of Natives reveals the true nature of the killer as "Wolfen", the wolf-spirit. They explain that the Wolfen have extraordinary abilities and "might be gods". Holt tells Wilson that he cannot fight the Wolfen, stating: "You don't have the eyes of the hunter, you have the eyes of the dead". The leader of the group, the Old Indian, informs Wilson that the Wolfen kill to protect their hunting-ground and target "the elderly, the sick--those who will not be missed".

It is also inferred by the killing of Ferguson and Whittington, both of whom were neither sick nor elderly, that Wolfen are also very secretive and will not stand for their existence to be exposed to the world. Getting too close as Ferguson and Whittington did and then the Wolfen shall take action. Wilson resolves to end his involvement in the case of Van der Veer, but he, Rebecca Neff, and Wilson's superior, Captain Warren, are cornered on Wall Street by the Wolfen-pack. Warren is advised to stay perfectly still, but he ignores their warnings and tries to escape the Wolfen; yet he fails to get away and is decapitated. Meanwhile, Wilson and Neff flee into a nearby building.

Wilson and Neff are shortly thereafter cornered in Van der Veer's penthouse by the pack, led by its white alpha male. Wilson smashes the model of the constructing project that threatened their hunting-ground, trying to communicate that the threat no longer exists and that he and Rebecca Neff are not enemies. The Wolfen vanish just as the police barge in. Wilson claims the attack was made by terrorists. In a voice-over, Wilson explains that Wolfen will continue preying on weak and isolated members of the human herd as humans do to each other through class-related conflict. Wolfen will continue being invisible to humanity because of their nature; not that of spirits but predators, who are higher on the food-chain than humans. The last scene is Eddie and his friends looking at the city from the bridge.

== Cast ==
- Albert Finney as Detective Dewey Wilson
- Diane Venora as Detective Rebecca Neff
- Edward James Olmos as Eddie Holt
- Gregory Hines as Coroner Whittington
- Tom Noonan as Dr. Carl Ferguson
- Dick O'Neill as Captain Warren
- Dehl Berti as Old Indian
- Peter Michael Goetz as Jonathan Ross
- Sam Gray as Mayor
- Ralph Bell as Commissioner
- Max M. Brown as Christopher Van der Veer
- Anne Marie Pohtamo as Pauline Van der Veer
- Reginald VelJohnson as Morgue Attendant
- James Tolkan as Baldy
- Victor Arnold as Roudenbush
- Frank Adonis as Scola
- Raymond Serra as Detective
- Donald Symington as Lawyer
- Roy Brocksmith as Fat Jogger In Park
- Rino Thunder as Native American
- Caitlin O'Heaney as ESS Operator
- Linda Gary as ESS Voice
- Charles Howerton as ESS Voice
- Burr DeBenning as ESS Voice
- Corey Burton as ESS Voice
- Patricia Parris as ESS Voice
- Andre Stojka as ESS Voice
- Mel Welles as ESS Voice
- Tom Waits as Drunken Bar-Owner (uncredited)

== Production ==
The film is known for its early use of an in-camera effect to portray the subjective point of view of a wolf. Similar to thermography, the technique was later adopted by other horror films such as the Predator film series. The setting for the transient home of the wolves was shot in the South Bronx (intersection of Louis Niñé Boulevard and Boston Road).

The church seen in the opening panorama shot was located at the intersection of E. 172nd Street and Seabury Place. The shot of this neighbourhood is from the north looking roughly south-south-east. The decrepit site of ruined buildings was no special effect; the church was built and burned exclusively for the film. Urban decay in the South Bronx in the early 1980s was so widespread that it was the ideal production setting.

Dustin Hoffman was interested in portraying the role of Dewey Wilson but Michael Wadleigh insisted on Albert Finney. According to Roger Ebert, the film was originally to have been distributed by United Artists. With claims of being overbudget and being over schedule, Orion Pictures tried to have Wadleigh fired. A contentious dispute led to Wadleigh being allowed to shoot what he needed before being let go while retaining director credit, while John D. Hancock would be brought in to supervise the ADR sessions after the film got cut down to an acceptable length by Richard Chew, who was not credited for his work.

== Release ==
Wolfen was released theatrically in the United States by Orion Pictures through Warner Bros. on July 24, 1981. The film grossed only $10,626,725 at the box office. It was released just a few months after another werewolf feature in The Howling, and less than a month before An American Werewolf in London; both of which outperformed Wolfen at the box office.

=== Home media ===
Wolfen was released on DVD by Warner Home Video on August 13, 2002. Warner Home Video would later re-release the film in 2004 and 2007, with the latter release being a part of its two-disk "Horror: 4 Film Favorites" pack. On June 2, 2015, it was released for the first time on Blu-ray by Warner Archive Collection.

=== Reception and legacy ===
On the review aggregator website Rotten Tomatoes, Wolfen holds a 72% approval rating based on 29 critic reviews. The consensus reads: “Police procedural meets werewolf flick in Wolfen, a creepy creature feature with a surprisingly profound side.” On Metacritic, the film has a weighted average score of 64 out of 100, based on 8 critics, indicating "generally positive reviews". Audiences polled by CinemaScore gave the film an average grade of "A-" on an A+ to F scale.

Roger Ebert gave the film three and a half out of a possible four stars, calling it, "an uncommonly intelligent treatment of a theme that is usually just exploited". There was some disagreement if Wolfen is about werewolves. Time Out called it a "werewolf movie", but Ebert asserted Wolfen "is not about werewolves but is about the possibility that Indians and wolves can exchange souls."

The film was nominated for four Saturn Awards including Best Horror Film, Best Director for Wadleigh, Best Writing and Best Actor for Finney at the 9th Saturn Awards.

A poster for the film can be seen in an alleyway in the 2019 film Joker toward the film's conclusion.
