= Communion (Strieber book) =

1987 book by Whitley Strieber

Communion: A True Story
- Front Cover
- Author: Whitley Strieber
- Language: English
- Publisher: Avon
- Publication date: 25 February 1987
- Media type: Print (paperback)
- Pages: 320
- ISBN: 978-0-380-70388-3
- OCLC: 17375661
- Followed by: Transformation

Communion: A True Story (1987) is a book by American ufologist and horror author Whitley Strieber. It is based on the purported experiences of Strieber, who underwent a feeling of "lost time" and terrifying flashbacks.

Budd Hopkins later hypnotized the author and suggested his account pointed to an alleged encounter with aliens. Communion was a nonfiction bestseller for six months in 1987.

The book was adapted into the 1989 Philippe Mora film Communion, starring Christopher Walken as Strieber and Lindsay Crouse as his wife Anne.

A 2008 trade paperback edition presents a new preface by the author.

Strieber calls the alleged beings "visitors", and compares a specific female individual he claims to have encountered, featured in the book's cover illustration, to the Sumerian deity Ishtar.

== Cover art ==
The cover painting was rendered by Ted Seth Jacobs and is considered one of the most widely recognized popular culture images depicting the purported phenomenon of "greys". Jacobs recounts his experience painting the Communion cover:

It was painted in my small apartment on East 83rd St, in New York City. Whitley sat with me first for a drawing of the Alien. As I sketched, he would indicate how to change the portrait so that it would more match what he saw. It was, I believe, the process used by police sketch artists. Every last detail was corrected according to his instructions. At one point, he said the image corresponded exactly to what he had seen. With Whitley beside me for the subsequent session, I began to paint the image on a wooden prepared panel, going through the same process as for the drawing, until Whitley finally said the image was exact. ... As to the gender of the Alien image, to tell the truth, the subject didn't come up. I don't even know if the 'greys' have gender as we understand it. Whitley corrected the developing image to have a certain fragility, a vulnerability. I suppose we Earthlings usually associate these qualities with femininity.

== Popular culture references ==
The X-Files episode "Jose Chung's From Outer Space" parodied the book cover.

Virginia screamo band Pg. 99 included an audio recording of a person reading a short excerpt of the story in their album Document #5.

Swedish progressive metal band Evergrey's album In Search of Truth is a concept album based on the book.

Strieber makes an appearance in the 2009 film Race to Witch Mountain.

== Bibliography ==
- Communion: A True Story by Whitley Strieber, Avon Books, paperback, 1995. ISBN 0-380-70388-2
