= Eleanor Roosevelt High School (Maryland) =

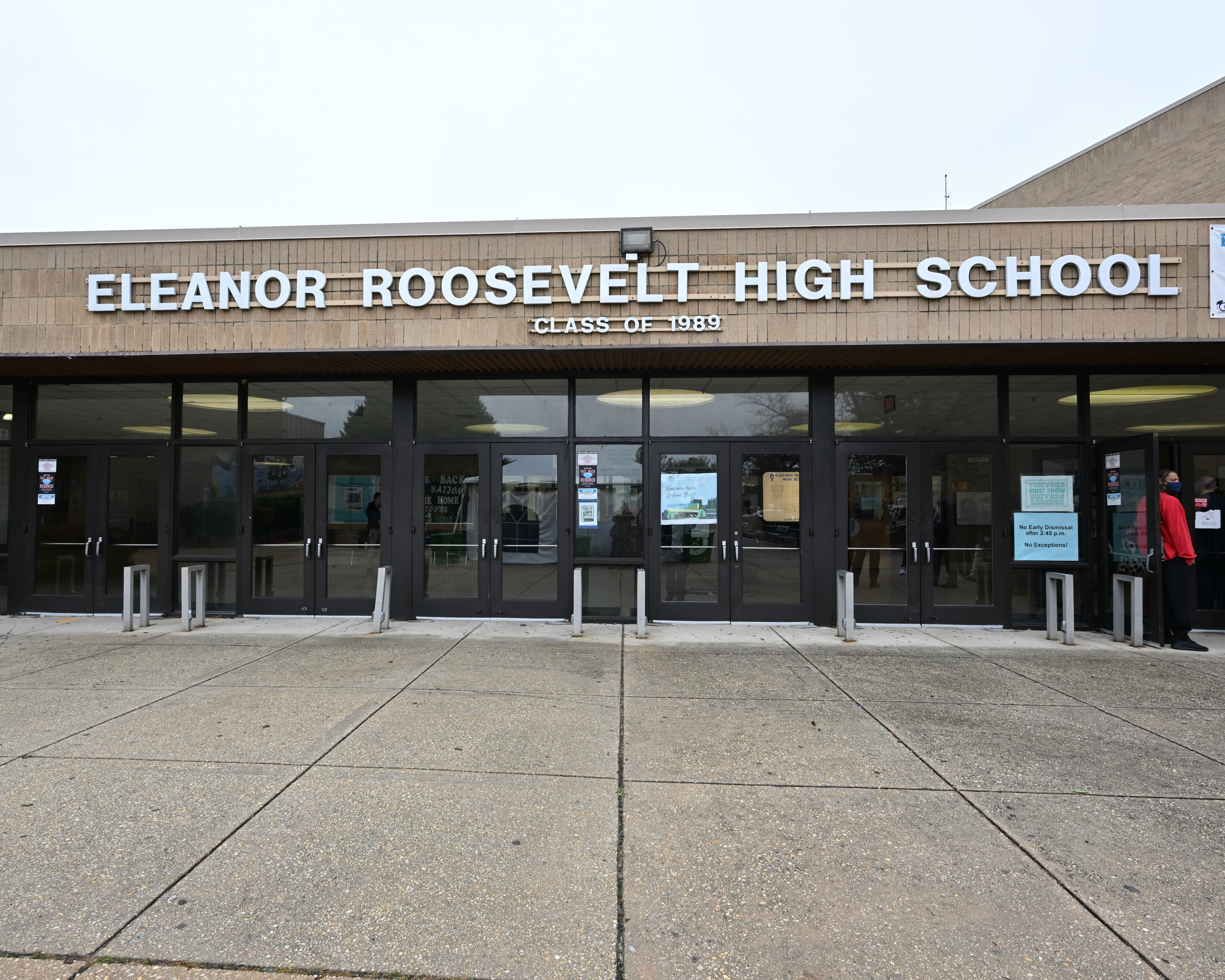

Location
- 7601 Hanover Parkway; Greenbelt, Maryland; 20770; United States; 38°59′41″N 76°52′10″W

Information
- Type: Public magnet high school
- Established: 1976; 50 years ago
- School district: Prince George's County Public Schools
- Principal: Portia Barnes
- Faculty: 200+
- Grades: 9–12
- Enrollment: 2700+
- Colors: Columbia blue & white
- Nickname: Raiders
- Website: www.pgcps.org/eleanorroosevelt/

Eleanor Roosevelt High School (ERHS) is a Maryland public magnet high school specializing in science, technology, engineering, and mathematics. The school was established in 1976 at its current location in Greenbelt, Maryland, United States and is part of the Prince George's County Public Schools system. It was the first high school named for former first lady Eleanor Roosevelt.

It serves all of the City of Greenbelt and a section of the Seabrook census-designated place. It also serves a section of the former Goddard CDP.

Roosevelt has received numerous awards, including being twice awarded National Blue Ribbon School of Excellence; a New American High School; a National School of Character; and receiving the Siemens Awards for Advanced Placement. Roosevelt was named #382 on America's Top 1,500 Public High Schools list for 2009, by Newsweek Magazine and was also recognized as a Silver Medal School by U.S. News & World Report, in 2008.

== History ==
In December 1975 Margaret Wolfe, a woman who previously lived in Greenbelt, sent a letter to the Washington Star suggesting that the school be named after Eleanor Roosevelt. Edna Benefiel, another woman who once resided in Greenbelt, later sent another letter to the Star also favoring the Eleanor Roosevelt name. Prince George's Post released an editorial favoring the naming on January 8, 1976. The PGCPS board voted for that name one week later. The school was scheduled to open in fall 1976.

== Academics ==
Roosevelt is best known for its specialized Science and Technology (S/T) program, which has been in place since the school was first opened. Roosevelt is the S/T center for the northern part of Prince George's County, and admission is based on a competitive exam. Roosevelt is a member of the National Consortium for Specialized Secondary Schools of Mathematics, Science and Technology (NCSSSMST).

Roosevelt is the first of three specialized science and technology centers located in the Prince George's County Public Schools system. STP is an active member of the National Consortium for Specialized Secondary Schools of Mathematics, Science and Technology (NCSSSMST). The magnet operates as a "School-Within-A-School", which essentially means it is a separate school within another school, and only a portion of the students who attend the school are enrolled in the magnet program. Many of the core courses such as English and Social Studies classes have mixed amounts of S/T, AOIT, QUEST, and comprehensive students in the same classes. The Science and Technology Center is a highly competitive selective enrollment program, and students are admitted into the magnet through pre-admission testing, as well as a combination of grades earned in four subject areas during seventh grade and the first quarter of eighth grade. The comprehensive program at ERHS is further divided into several smaller schools, or Career Academies, as part of the smaller learning communities initiative. Roosevelt was the first high school within the county to feature and successfully implement academy programs, and the strategy has since been expanded and implemented at several other area high schools.

ERHS also offers several AP (advanced placement) courses which are open to all students.

== Athletics ==
=== Basketball ===
The ERHS basketball teams are perennial county contenders. The boys team led by Coach Brendan O'Connell won the 4A South Region Title in six of the past nine years (all except 2008, 2009, and 2014). They last won the 4A State Championship in 2022. The program has produced former NBA player Eddie Basden, former NBA player Delonte West, former University of Kentucky player Darnell Dodson, and Lasan Kromah of the 2014 National Champion UConn Huskies. The girls basketball team, led by Coach Delton Fuller, has dominated county play in recent years. They won five straight 4A State Championships from 2005 to 2009.

=== Track and field ===
In 2007 the Girls track team broke through at the Penn Relays, winning two Penn Relay Championship of America events and they followed that up with another win in 2008. The Girls Outdoor Track team won the State Championship in 1978, 1995, 2000, 2003, 2005, and 2007–2009. The Raiders hold 6 of the top 10 fastest 4 × 100 meters times in State Meet history, 5 of the top 10 4×200 M times, four of the top 10 4 × 400 m times, and 5 of the top 10 4×800 M times. The cross country teams have also been very consistent with the girls team winning three straight state championships from 2004 to 2006, with a second-place finish in 2007. In 2007, they went on to Nationals and became 8th best in the country. The Girls Indoor track team has won a state record 20 State Championships including the last one in 2012. The boys track team has won seven Indoor State titles and 5 Outdoor State Titles, most recently in 2008.

=== Lacrosse ===
The boys lacrosse team is a Club Team currently (2010–2011) composed of players from surrounding public county high schools. As lacrosse is not a sport currently offered at all of the high schools in Prince George's County, Maryland, the team competes against area schools in the MILL (Maryland Independent Lacrosse League). In 2009, the total number of county high schools with lacrosse programs including public and private was up to nine.

=== Swimming ===
The girls' swimming team won the state title in the second year of the title's existence in 2008 and they were runners-up the previous year. The girls team has won 18 straight county titles, while the boys team has won 8 straight.

=== Tennis ===
The tennis team is also typically one of the best in the county. In 2007 Katelyn Stokes won the Girls Singles State Title as a freshman. She was upset her sophomore year but went on to win again in 2009 and 2010. In their 2023 season the tennis team went undefeated for the 3rd year in a row.

=== Wrestling ===
The wrestling team is a consistent contender in the county winning the past 4 county titles. They are under the tutelage of Head Coach Cornelius Cortez and assisted by longtime coach Mike McRae, the Raiders highest placed finish in the State Tournament was in 1989 when they finished 4th. The ERHS Raiders made history in 2016, when Chibueze OnWuka was the 1st ever state champ in school history at 220 pounds.

=== Soccer ===
Eleanor Roosevelt has a rich history with both their boys and girls soccer teams. The boys soccer team tied for the Maryland 4A Championship in 1984 and has enjoyed several regional championships (1985, 1988, 1998, 1999, 2015, 2016). Both the boys and girls soccer team have a fierce rivalry with the Bowie High School Bulldogs. Additionally, both programs have seen many players continue their soccer careers by playing in college. The girls team won three region titles in a row from 2005 to 2007 and won again in 2011, as well as 2013, 2014, 2017, 2018, and 2019. The Raiders won the lone State Championship by a County team in 2003. The Raiders saw their state title hopes fall just short in 2005 and 2006. In 2005 they lost a State Semi Final Game to C.M. Wright on penalty kicks and in 2006 they lost a State Semi Final Game to Quince Orchard. This was a game that they thoroughly dominated, hitting the crossbar or post at least five times and conceding a goal on a miscommunication in the 2nd OT period.

== Accolades and achievements ==
Roosevelt has received numerous prestigious academic awards throughout its thirty-six-year history. The school was named a National Blue Ribbon School of Excellence in both 1991 and 1998, making it a rare two-time recipient of the award. It was also recognized as a Maryland Blue Ribbon School in 1991 and 1998, named a New American High School in 1999, received the 2002–2003 national Siemens Awards for Advanced Placement, and was named a National School of Character by the Character Education Partnership in 2002. Eleanor Roosevelt is widely regarded as one of the most academically challenging high schools in the nation. Eleanor Roosevelt is considered one of the highest preforming high schools in Prince George's County and is consistently recognized for its academic excellence. Roosevelt also has more students enrolled in Advanced Placement courses than any other high school in the county, with many of those students earning passing scores of three or higher on AP exams. In 2009, Newsweek Magazine ranked Roosevelt No.382 on its list of America's Top 1,500 Public High Schools. The school was also recognized as a Silver Medal School by U.S. News & World Report, in 2008.

ERHS has one of the top music programs in the county with its extensive band and orchestras, choir and theater groups.

== Notable alumni ==
- Alvin Blount (1982), professional football athlete
- Russell Hairston (1982), professional football athlete
- Mary Zappone (1982), American businesswoman
- Cheryl Mills (1983), lawyer, White House counsel
- Annette Thomas (1983), science publishing executive and trustee of Yale University
- Kenny Lattimore (1985), singer
- Rob Davis (1986), professional football athlete
- John Turner (1986), professional basketball athlete
- Tim Jacobs (1988), professional football athlete
- Myla Goldberg (1989), American author (Bee Season, Wickett's Remedy)
- Sergey Brin (1990), co-founder and president of technology of Google
- William “Bill” Heiser (1991), soccer player / Superintendent of Baltimore County Public Schools
- Jermaine Lewis (1992), professional football athlete
- Ben Barnes, (1993), member of Maryland House of Delegates
- Justin Ross (1994), member of Maryland House of Delegates
- Derrick Burgess (1996), professional football athlete
- Mýa Marie Harrison (1996), musical entertainer
- Haneefah Wood (1997), actress
- Alpha Bangura (1998), basketball player
- Charles Hill (1998), professional football athlete
- Eddie Basden (2001), professional basketball athlete
- Delonte West (2001), professional basketball athlete
- Gabrielle Christian (2002), American film and television actress
- Shruti Naik (2002), Scientist and Advocate
- Joe Pug (2002), singer-songwriter
- Rosa Salazar (2003), actress
- Tramell Tillman (2003), actor
- Will Davis (2004), professional football athlete
- Jared Gaither (2004), professional football athlete
- Derrick Harvey (2004), professional football athlete
- Derrick Williams (2005), professional football athlete
- Daniel Cates (2007), professional poker player
- Okechukwu Okoroha (2008), professional football athlete
- Lasan Kromah (2009), basketball player
- Afia Charles (2010), sprinter, 2012 Olympian
- Isaiah Prince (2015), professional football athlete
- Naji Marshall (2017), professional basketball athlete
- Martin Lawrence (transferred to Friendly), comedian, actor
