= Eugene Brave Rock =

First Nations actor and stuntman from Canada

- Born: 1978 (age 47–48); Stand Off, Alberta, Canada
- Citizenship: Blood First Nation and Canada
- Occupation: Actor
- Years active: 2007–present

Eugene Brave Rock is a Blackfoot actor and stuntman from Canada. He is from the Blood First Nation of Blackfoot Confederacy. Brave Rock started as an actor, before being trained as a stuntman; he later appeared in various minor television roles before landing his first major film role as Chief in Wonder Woman.

== Biography ==
Brave Rock grew up on the Kainai Nation reserve in Alberta and attended the Plains Indian Cultural Survival School in Calgary, where he landed his first role in a play. He was later trained as a stuntman, and performed for the Buffalo Bill's Wild West Show in Disneyland Paris. Upon his return to Calgary, Brave Rock worked on several television productions as a stuntman and actor, taking on minor roles in Bury My Heart at Wounded Knee, Heartland, Blackstone, Klondike and Hell on Wheels. When The Revenant began filming in Alberta, Brave Rock and his brother were recruited to train native stuntmen; it was during this time he was contacted by the producers of Wonder Woman, who invited him to audition for a role. Though Brave Rock was not confident of his audition, he was cast in the film a month later.

Brave Rock was honored with a ceremonial headdress/war bonnet by the Blood Tribe on June 8, 2017, at a ceremony held at the Tatsikiisaapo'p Middle School, a rare and high honour in First Nations cultures.

== Other work ==
In 2022, Braverock founded the Oki Language Project. The mission of Oki Language Project is honoring elders and the preservation of languages and culture of Indigenous communities throughout Turtle Island (North America).

His advisory council includes director Chris Eyre (Cheyenne-Arapaho), actor Kiowa Gordon (Hualapai), actor Zahn McClarnon (Hunkpapa Lakota), actor Wes Studi (Cherokee Nation), and singer Taboo (Shoshone descent).

Braverock creates platforms through The Oki Language Project to promote other artists, like Karen Clarkson (Choctaw Nation), Nicholas Galanin (Tlingit/Unangax), Tony Abeyta (Navajo), Dennis Ziemienski, Cynthia Pinot, and actor/artist Michael Horse.

- Brave Rock: Guest speaker at the University of Pennsylvania, "Representation, Symbolization and Indigeneity," Slought Foundation, PA, November 15, 2019
- Brave Rock: Guest speaker at Princeton University, "The Arts of Anti-Racism and Social Justice," December 15, 2020.
- Brave Rock: Guest speaker at the Digital for climate change- Science Summit at the United Nations General Assembly - NYC, SEP 18, 2023

== Filmography ==
=== Film ===
| Year | Title | Role | Director | Notes |
|---|---|---|---|---|
| 2015 | The Revenant | | Alejandro G. Iñárritu | stunts |
| 2017 | Wonder Woman | Chief Napi | Patty Jenkins | |
| 2020 | The Corruption of Divine Providence | Chief Bird | Jeremy Torrie | |
| 2021 | Montana Story | Mukki | Scott McGehee and David Siegel | |
| 2023 | The Oath | Cohor | Darin Scott | |

=== Television ===
| Year | Title | Role | Notes |
|---|---|---|---|
| 2007 | Bury My Heart at Wounded Knee | | |
| 2016 | Hell on Wheels | Ute Indian | 1 episode |
| 2017 | Jamestown | | |
| 2021 | The Secret History of the Wild West | Calf Shirt | Episode "Bear Medicine" |
| 2021–present | Resident Alien | Shane | |
| 2022–present | Dark Winds | Frank Nakai | |
| 2022–present | That Dirty Black Bag | The Stranger | |
| 2023 | Spirit Rangers | Crane | Voice; Episode: "Slow and Steady Eddy/Salmon Where Are You?" |
