= Sleepless Nights (novel) =

1979 novel by Elizabeth Hardwick

- First edition (US)
- Author: Elizabeth Hardwick
- Language: English
- Genre: Literary fiction
- Publisher: Random House (US); Weidenfeld and Nicolson (UK)
- Publication date: 1979
- Publication place: United States
- Pages: 151
- ISBN: 978-0394505275

Sleepless Nights is a 1979 novel by American novelist and critic Elizabeth Hardwick.

== Summary ==
In Sleepless Nights a woman looks back on her life—the parade of people, the shifting background of place—and assembles a scrapbook of memories, reflections, portraits, letters, wishes, and dreams. The novel contains autobiographical elements including glimpses into her childhood in Kentucky, visiting jazz clubs to see Billie Holiday, trysts with American Communists, poets, and New York's literary intelligentsia.

Hardwick dedicated the novel to her daughter, Harriet, and to Mary McCarthy. As told by writer Sarah Nicole Prickett: "Hardwick began the novel after divorcing her husband [the American poet Robert Lowell] and finished it after he died in a taxi from the airport to her apartment." The book was influenced by both Renata Adler’s Speedboat and Colette’s The Pure and the Impure.

== Reception ==
In a rave review for The New York Times, Joan Didion called Sleepless Nights an "extraordinary and haunting book".

Writing for The New York Times in 2018, Lauren Groff referred to the book as "brilliant, brittle and strange".

In 1979, Sleepless Nights was nominated for the National Book Critics Circle Award for Fiction.

== Cultural influence ==
Sigrid Nunez drew inspiration from the book while writing her novel The Friend.
