= What Are You Going Through =

2020 novel by American writer Sigrid Nunez

- First edition cover
- Author: Sigrid Nunez
- Language: English
- Publisher: Riverhead Books
- Publication date: September 8, 2020
- Publication place: United States
- Pages: 224
- ISBN: 978-0593191415

What Are You Going Through is a 2020 novel by the American writer Sigrid Nunez published by Riverhead Books. Its exploration of friendship, life and death received mostly positive reviews.

It was adapted as the film The Room Next Door (2024) by Spanish filmmaker Pedro Almodóvar. It is his first film to be made in English.

== Background and writing ==
The novel's title comes from an essay by French writer Simone Weil from her book Waiting For God. The novel was published in 2020 during the COVID-19 pandemic, though Nunez had completed the writing before the pandemic began.

Like her earlier book, The Friend (2018), the book involves a suicide; a terminally ill woman decides to end her life on her own terms. Despite the difficulty of the themes explored in her books, Nunez deliberately includes comedic moments throughout her work. She has said "when [comedy is] left out of a work, something essential is missing."

== Reception ==
=== Critical reception ===
Heller McAlpin, writing for NPR, praised the novel as a "[...] deeply humane reminder of the great solace of both companionship and literature". Critics compared the book favorably to Nunez's The Friend. McAlpin referred to the book as a "worthy followup" and "companion piece" to the 2018 book. Dwight Garner, writing for The New York Times, made a similar comparison, and praised the book as "[...] as good as 'The Friend,' if not better."

Joan Frank of The Washington Post notes that, "One's moved by the scope and pith of this novel's ambition, as it addresses our biggest questions by naming the particular — the way the dying recited what mattered to them in Wim Wenders's iconic film Wings of Desire. But most striking may be how Nunez's narrator transfigures, through deepening compassion, from a wry, circumspect observer into someone raked raw with hapless love for her vanishing friend [...] Still, it's the here-and-now of What Are You Going Through that spears us, its chorale-like testimonies, their preemptive requiem."

Anri Wheeler of The Boston Globe concludes by saying, "In the end, Nunez leaves some of the reader's biggest questions unanswered. What matters, as with Weil's question that opens the book, is the asking. In doing so, meaning is made. The narrator, and in turn the reader, are transformed."

== Film adaptation ==
What Are You Going Through was made into a film renamed The Room Next Door. It is written and directed by Spanish filmmaker Pedro Almodóvar in his English-language full-length debut. It stars Tilda Swinton and Julianne Moore alongside John Turturro and Alessandro Nivola. It was awarded the Golden Lion, the top prize of the Venice Film Festival.
