= Little Star =

Little Star may refer to:

== Music ==
- "Little Star" (The Elegants song), 1958
- "Little Star" (Madonna song), 1998
- "Little Star", by Chuck Berry from New Juke Box Hits, 1961
- "Little Star", by Stina Nordenstam from And She Closed Her Eyes, 1994
- "Little Star", a single by Indian singer Shakthisree Gopalan, 2011
- Little Star Records, an independent label that existed from 1961 to 1963

== Television ==
- Little Star (TV series), a 2010–2011 Filipino drama series
- Little Star, a 1997–2003 children's program broadcast by Treehouse TV
- "Little Star" (Dora the Explorer), a 2001 episode

== Other uses ==
- Little Star (novel), a 2010 novel by John Ajvide Lindqvist
- Little Star Foundation, a charity established by Andrea Jaeger
- Little Star (comic), a British nursery comic which launched in 1972 that was comparable to Bimbo
- Little Star Journal, a magazine of poetry and prose established in 2009
