= Uncertainty (film) =

- Directed by: Scott McGehee; David Siegel
- Written by: Scott McGehee; David Siegel
- Produced by: Scott McGehee; David Siegel
- Starring: Joseph Gordon-Levitt; Lynn Collins; Assumpta Serna; Olivia Thirlby
- Cinematography: Rain Li
- Edited by: Paul Zucker
- Music by: Peter Nashel
- Production company: Kinocorp Picture
- Distributed by: IFC Films
- Release dates: September 8, 2008 (TIFF); November 13, 2009 (United States)
- Running time: 105 minutes
- Country: United States
- Language: English
- Box office: $36,689

Uncertainty is a 2008 American indie crime drama thriller film written, produced, and directed by Scott McGehee and David Siegel. It stars Joseph Gordon-Levitt and Lynn Collins. It was first released at the 2008 Toronto International Film Festival.

Distribution rights were acquired by IFC Films and received a limited theatrical release on November 13, 2009. It was simultaneously made available to cable viewers via video on demand.

The film was shot in HD on the Arriflex D-20.

== Plot ==
Bobby (Joseph Gordon-Levitt) and Kate (Lynn Collins) are a young couple who have been together ten months. Kate is 11 weeks pregnant. They can't make up their minds where to go on the Fourth of July, or whether to have the baby, so they decide to flip a coin. After Bobby flips the coin, they both run off Brooklyn Bridge in opposite directions. From that moment on two separate storylines are followed.

One storyline takes place in Brooklyn, where Bobby and Kate decide to go visit Kate's family. On the way they pick up a stray dog, whose owner they try to locate. Kate's family has its share of family drama, with an uncle who is institutionalized and suffers from memory loss, a brother who died five years earlier, and a sister who is taking a year off before going to college, much to her mother's dismay.

The other storyline takes place in Manhattan (beginning in Chinatown), where Bobby and Kate find a cellphone belonging to a criminal who values it at $500,000. They try to set up an exchange, but after narrowly escaping pursuit from a killer, Bobby throws the cellphone onto a passing boat.

Both storylines end the next day on a bridge, with the lines "What do you want to do now? / What do we do now? I don't know. I guess we just keep going".

The storylines are also set apart by colors of vehicles and Bobby and Kate's clothing. In the Manhattan/Chinatown storyline, they both wear easily recognizable yellow, a dress for her and a T-shirt for him, and take a yellow cab, while in the Brooklyn storyline, they are dressed in more subtle shades of green and Kate is driving her green car. In the first scene on the bridge, Kate wears the yellow dress from the Manhattan story, while Bobby wears the outfit he'll wear in Brooklyn.

== Cast ==
- Joseph Gordon-Levitt as Bobby Thompson
- Lynn Collins as Kate Montero

Brooklyn/Queens

- Assumpta Serna as Silvia Montero
- Olivia Thirlby as Sophie Montero
- Louis Arcella as Diego (Kate's uncle)
- Nelson Landrieu as Felix Montero
- Manoel Felciano as Greg Montero

== Reception ==
On Rotten Tomatoes the film has an approval rating of 50% based on 26 reviews, with an average rating of 5.4 out of 10. On Metacritic the film has a score of 45% based on reviews from 9 critics, indicating "mixed or average reviews".

Todd McCarthy of Variety magazine called it "Half formulaic and half simply unimaginative."
