= The Room Next Door =

2024 film by Pedro Almodóvar

- Theatrical release poster
- Spanish: La habitación de al lado
- Directed by: Pedro Almodóvar
- Written by: Pedro Almodóvar
- Based on: What Are You Going Through by Sigrid Nunez
- Produced by: Agustín Almodóvar; Esther García
- Starring: Tilda Swinton; Julianne Moore; John Turturro; Alessandro Nivola
- Cinematography: Edu Grau
- Edited by: Teresa Font
- Music by: Alberto Iglesias
- Production company: El Deseo
- Distributed by: Warner Bros. Pictures
- Release dates: 2 September 2024 (Venice); 18 October 2024 (Spain)
- Running time: 107 minutes
- Country: Spain
- Language: English
- Box office: $21.5 million

The Room Next Door (Spanish: La habitación de al lado) is a 2024 Spanish drama film written and directed by Pedro Almodóvar, in his English-language feature debut, based on the 2020 novel What Are You Going Through by Sigrid Nunez. Tilda Swinton and Julianne Moore star with John Turturro and Alessandro Nivola in supporting roles. The plot follows the relationship between two close friends (Swinton and Moore) as the former faces the prospect of ending her life due to terminal illness.

The film had its world premiere in the main competition of the 81st Venice International Film Festival on 2 September 2024, where it won the Golden Lion, a first for a Spanish film. It was released theatrically in Spain on 18 October 2024 by Warner Bros. Pictures. It won three Goyas (Best Adapted Screenplay, Best Cinematography, and Best Original Score) at the 39th Goya Awards.

== Plot ==
Ingrid is a successful author who learns that Martha, a friend with whom she once worked at the same magazine, has terminal cancer. They reconnect at the Manhattan hospital where Martha is being treated, and Martha tells Ingrid her life story. In the 1970s, Martha became impregnated by Fred, a young man she had met in college. Fred left to fight in the Vietnam War, returning with PTSD. Fred later left and remarried, leaving Martha's daughter Michelle to constantly ask her mother about Fred's whereabouts as she grew up. Wanting to appease her daughter, Martha reached out to Fred's wife, who informed her that Fred had died trying to save a nonexistent person whose voices he hallucinated from a house fire. Michelle grew resentful of her mother and became estranged. In the present day, Martha has no family, and reveals to Ingrid that she recently bought euthanasia pills so that she could secretly end her life.

Ingrid, though conflicted at first, ultimately comes to terms with Martha's plan and agrees to stay with her during her final moments in a rented country house in Woodstock, New York. Martha tells Ingrid that she will know of her death when her door is closed the following morning. One day, Ingrid wakes up to find Martha's door closed, but quickly discovers that Martha is still alive. Martha tells Ingrid, who is upset by the fear she experienced, that she had opened a window, allowing a breeze to close the door, and adds that the incident could be seen as a practice run for when she truly dies. Despite Martha's explanation, Ingrid remains irritated by the unsettling episode.

Ingrid has lunch with fellow writer Damian, who was once both her and Martha's shared lover and is aware of Martha's plan. He helps hire a lawyer Ingrid can depend on for defense against the police after Martha dies. Ingrid returns home to find Martha dead on a lounge chair outside, with her bedroom door closed. She finds a note from Martha thanking her and asking her to contact Michelle. Ingrid informs the police, and a religious fundamentalist officer questions her claim that she was unaware of Martha's suicide plans. He reveals that they know Martha had asked another friend to join her before she asked Ingrid. Ingrid leaves the interrogation and contacts Damian and the lawyer.

Ingrid gets in touch with Michelle and invites her to the house where Martha died. They lie together on the lounge chairs outside as it snows.

== Cast ==
- Tilda Swinton as Martha / Michelle
  - Esther McGregor as young Martha
- Julianne Moore as Ingrid
- John Turturro as Damian
- Alessandro Nivola as policeman
- Juan Diego Botto as photographer
- Raúl Arévalo as Spanish priest (Bernardo)
- Victoria Luengo as Fred's wife
- Alex Høgh Andersen as Fred
- Alvise Rigo as Jonah, the trainer
- Melina Matthews as lawyer

== Production ==
Almodóvar talked about plans to shoot an English-language film set in New York City on the eve of his trip to the 2023 Cannes Film Festival. The title The Room Next Door was advertised in late 2023. In January 2024, El Deseo announced that Julianne Moore and Tilda Swinton had been cast in the lead roles with John Turturro as another cast member. Swinton described the film as "a natural successor, strangely, to Pain and Glory". The film is an El Deseo production with the participation of Movistar Plus+. Filming began on 3 March 2024 in Madrid. Alessandro Nivola joined the cast that same month. Shooting locations also included New York City. On 12 June 2024, Juan Diego Botto, Raúl Arévalo, Melina Matthews, and Victoria Luengo were announced as additional cast members. Edu Grau was the film's cinematographer.

== Release ==
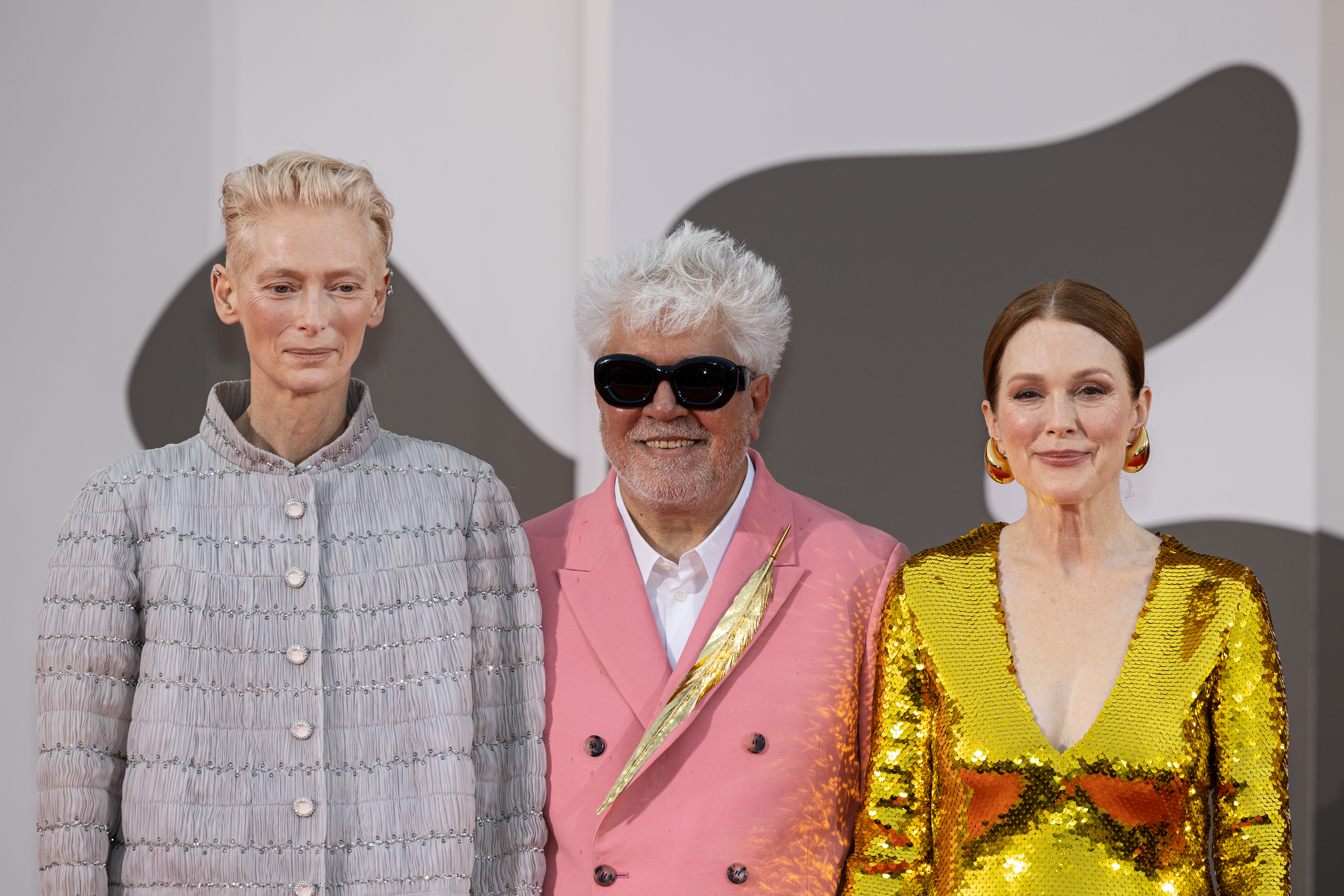
Swinton, Almodóvar, and Moore at the 81st Venice International Film Festival.

Before filming began, Almodóvar's recurring North American distributor Sony Pictures Classics picked up rights to the film in North America, the Middle East, India, South Africa, Australia, and New Zealand.

The film was released in cinemas in Spain on 18 October 2024 by Warner Bros. Pictures. Warner Bros. also acquired distribution rights for the United Kingdom, Germany, Italy, the Nordics, Central and Eastern Europe (excluding Poland), Latin America, and some territories in Asia-Pacific, including Japan. It will be made available on Movistar Plus+ in Spain after its theatrical window.

In July 2024, the film was reportedly likely to premiere at the 81st Venice International Film Festival; that release was confirmed a week later when the film was announced to be premiering in competition. Alberto Barbera reported that the film was premiering during the festival's second half. The film was also selected for screenings at the 2024 Toronto International Film Festival for its North American premiere, and the 72nd San Sebastián International Film Festival as a 'Donostia Award' screening, as well as for the Centerpiece selection of the 62nd New York Film Festival at the Alice Tully Hall on 4 October 2024 (for its U.S. premiere).

The film made it to the 'World Cinema' strand of the MAMI Mumbai Film Festival 2024 for its South Asian premiere on 19 October 2024. It was scheduled to open in New York City and Los Angeles on 20 December 2024 by Sony Pictures Classics, followed by a limited release in select US cities on Christmas Day, and a January 2025 wide US release. In the United States, it is Almodovar's first ever film rated for a general audience; the MPA gave it a PG-13 rating for “thematic content, strong language, and some sexual references” (all his previous films had been rated R, NC-17, or unrated with admission limited to adults only). Pathé released the film in French theatres on 8 January 2025.

== Reception ==
=== Critical response ===
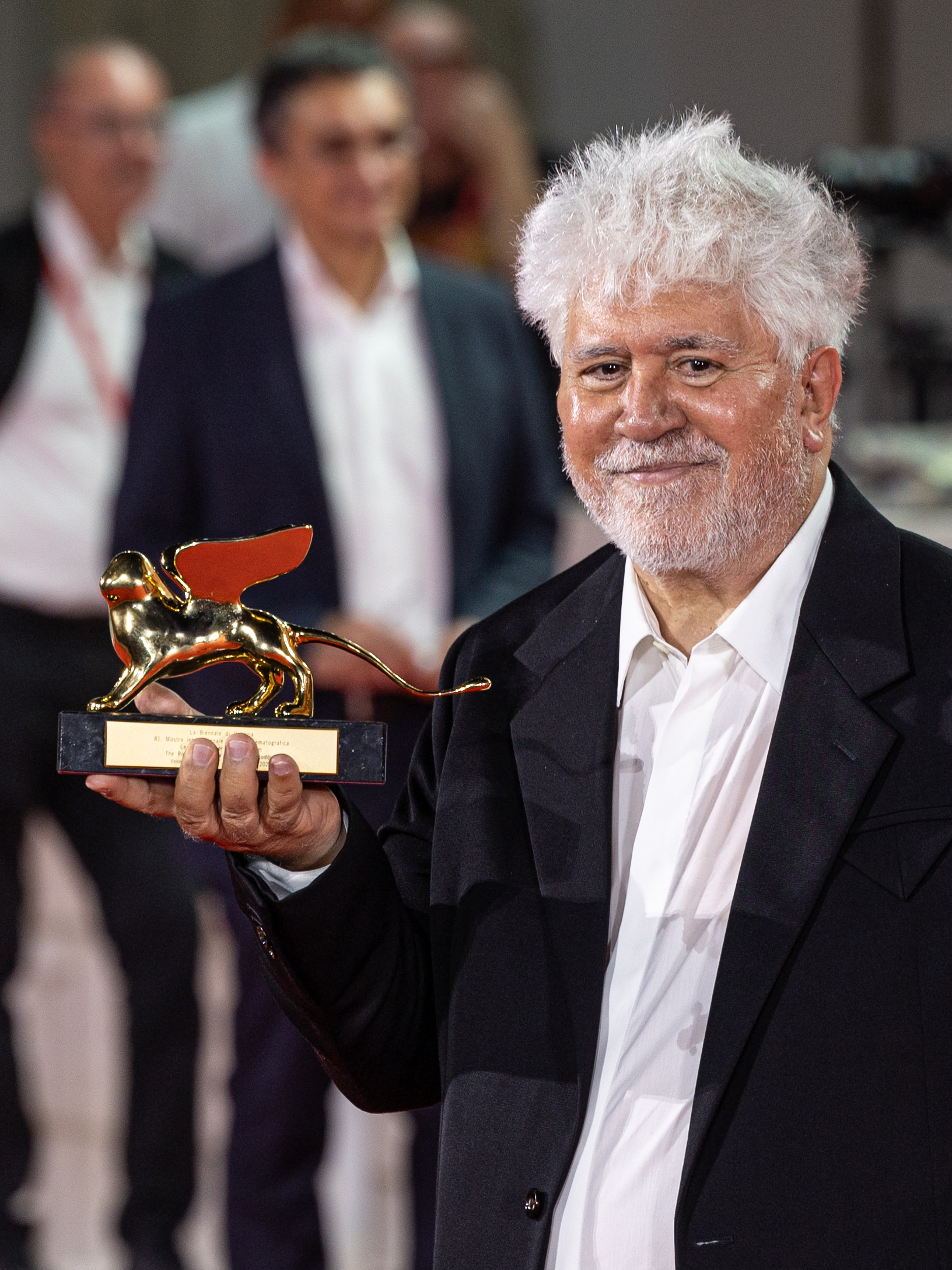
Pedro Almodóvar holding the Golden Lion won by The Room Next Door at the Venice International Film Festival

On the review aggregator website Rotten Tomatoes, 81% of 190 critics' reviews are positive, with an average rating of 7.1/10. The website's consensus reads: "Anchored by a pair of terrific performances swathed in vivid colors, Spanish auteur Pedro Almodóvar's English-language feature debut attests to his universal fluency in provocative filmmaking." Metacritic, which uses a weighted average, assigned the film a score of 70 out of 100, based on 45 critics, indicating "generally favorable" reviews.

Stephanie Zacharek of Time wrote that "if it's possible to make a joyful movie about death, Almodóvar has just done it".

Owen Gleiberman of Variety assessed that Swinton "gives a monumental performance", "worthy of comparison to the spirit and virtuosity of Vanessa Redgrave".

Robbie Collin of The Daily Telegraph lamented that the result of Almodóvar's anglophone feature debut is "depressingly thin".

Peter Bradshaw of The Guardian rated the film 4 out of 5 stars, finding it "as extravagant and engrossing and doggedly mysterious as anything [Almodóvar] has done recently". Also reviewing for The Guardian, Wendy Ide rated the film 3 out of 5 stars, describing it as feeling "emotionally empty".

Monica Castillo of RogerEbert.com rated the film 3 out of 4 stars, declaring it "a heartfelt meditation on friendship, grief, and death".

=== Accolades ===
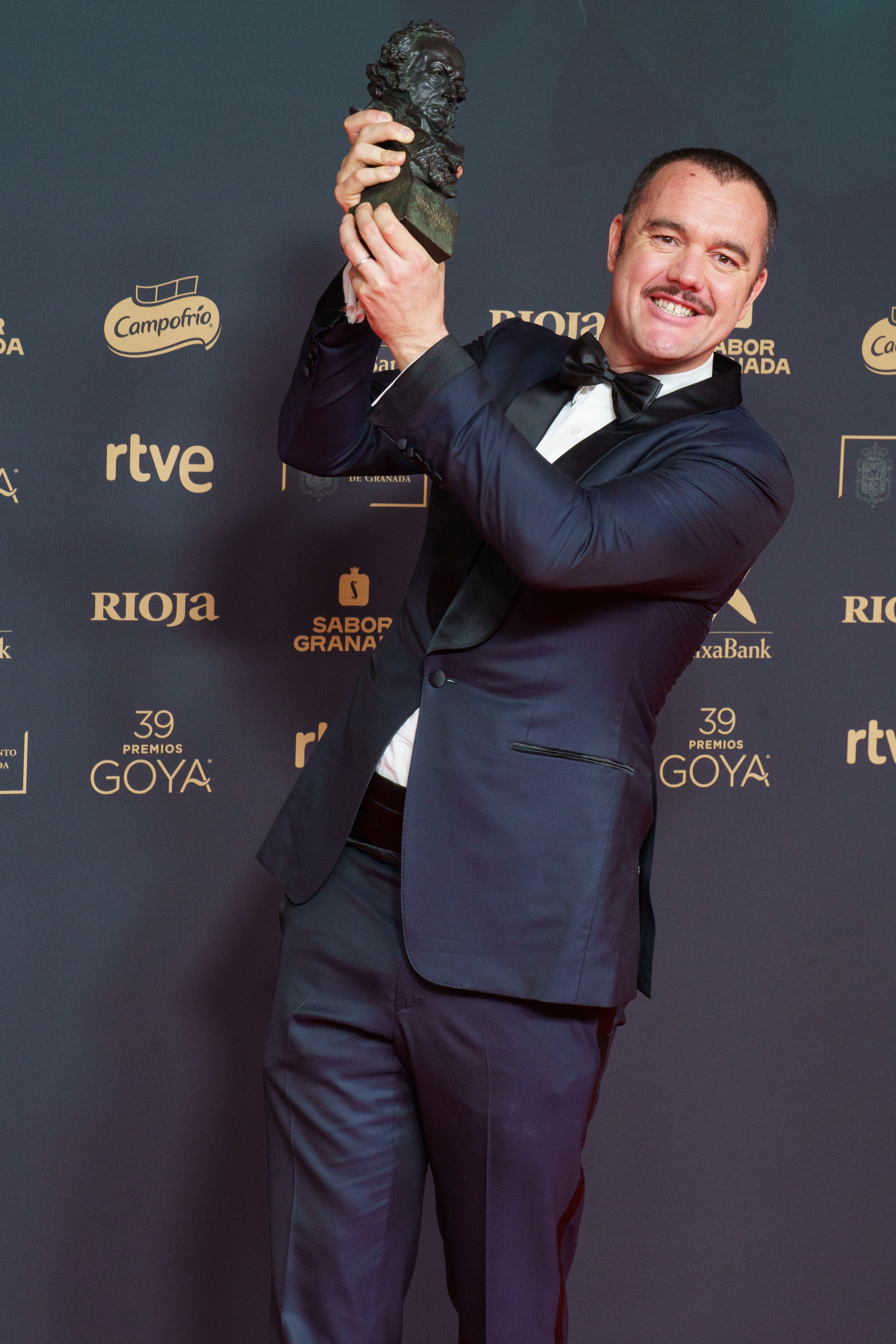
DoP Edu Grau holding his Goya Award

Award	Ceremony date	Category	Recipient(s)	Result	Ref.
Venice International Film Festival	7 September 2024	Golden Lion	The Room Next Door	Won	
Venice International Film Festival	7 September 2024	Brian Award	The Room Next Door	Won	
Hollywood Music in Media Awards	20 November 2024	Best Original Score – Independent Film	Alberto Iglesias	Won	
European Film Awards	7 December 2024	Best European Film	The Room Next Door	Nominated	
European Film Awards	7 December 2024	Best European Director	Pedro Almodóvar	Nominated	
European Film Awards	7 December 2024	Best European Screenwriter	Pedro Almodóvar	Nominated	
European Film Awards	7 December 2024	Best European Actress	Tilda Swinton	Nominated	
Golden Globe Awards	5 January 2025	Best Actress in a Motion Picture – Drama	Tilda Swinton	Nominated	
AARP Movies for Grownups Awards	8 February 2025	Best Director	Pedro Almodóvar	Nominated	
Feroz Awards	25 January 2025	Best Drama Film	The Room Next Door	Nominated	
Feroz Awards	25 January 2025	Best Director	Pedro Almodóvar	Won	
Feroz Awards	25 January 2025	Best Screenplay	Pedro Almodóvar	Nominated	
Feroz Awards	25 January 2025	Best Film Poster	Juan Gatti, Nico Bustos	Nominated	
Feroz Awards	25 January 2025	Best Trailer	Alberto Leal	Nominated	
Feroz Awards	25 January 2025	Best Original Soundtrack	Alberto Iglesias	Won	
Satellite Awards	26 January 2025	Best Actress in a Motion Picture	Tilda Swinton	Nominated	
Satellite Awards	26 January 2025	Best Adapted Screenplay	Pedro Almodóvar	Nominated	
Satellite Awards	26 January 2025	Best Original Score	Alberto Iglesias	Nominated	
CEC Medals	3 February 2025	Best Music	Alberto Iglesias	Nominated	
Goya Awards	8 February 2025	Best Director	Pedro Almodóvar	Nominated	
Goya Awards	8 February 2025	Best Adapted Screenplay	Pedro Almodóvar	Won	
Goya Awards	8 February 2025	Best Actress	Julianne Moore	Nominated	
Goya Awards	8 February 2025	Best Actress	Tilda Swinton	Nominated	
Goya Awards	8 February 2025	Best Cinematography	Edu Grau	Won	
Goya Awards	8 February 2025	Best Original Score	Alberto Iglesias	Won	
Goya Awards	8 February 2025	Best Art Direction	Inbal Weinberg	Nominated	
Goya Awards	8 February 2025	Best Costume Design	Bina Daigeler	Nominated	
Goya Awards	8 February 2025	Best Makeup and Hairstyles	Morag Ross, Manolo García	Nominated	
Goya Awards	8 February 2025	Best Sound	Sergio Bürmann, Anna Harrington, Marc Orts	Nominated	
Actors and Actresses Union Awards	10 March 2025	Best Film Actor in a Minor Role	Juan Diego Botto	Nominated	
Actors and Actresses Union Awards	10 March 2025	Best Film Actress in a Minor Role	Victoria Luengo	Nominated	
Platino Awards	27 April 2025	Best Director	Pedro Almodóvar	Nominated	
Platino Awards	27 April 2025	Best Original Score	Alberto Iglesias	Won	
Platino Awards	27 April 2025	Best Cinematography	Edu Grau	Won	
Golden Trailer Awards	29 May 2025	Best Foreign Poster	Pathe / Leroy & Rose (for "French Poster")	Nominated	

== See also ==
- List of Spanish films of 2024
