= Karina Lombard =

Actress (born 1969)

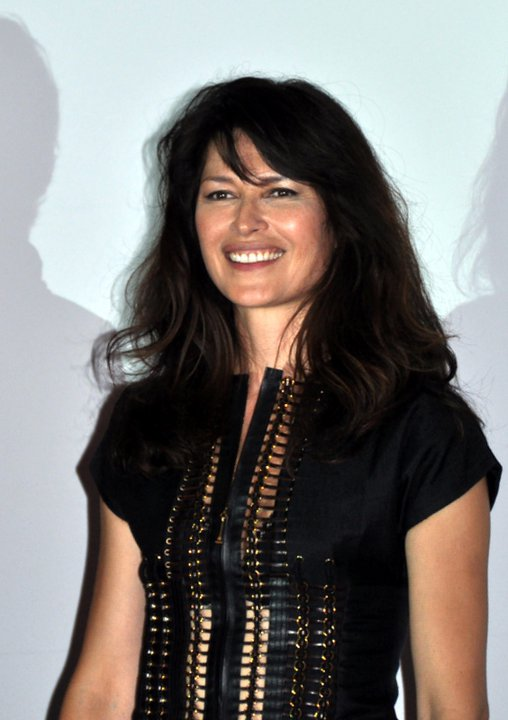
- Born: 21 January 1969 (age 57); Tahiti, French Polynesia
- Occupation: Actress
- Years active: 1987–present
- Website: karinalombard.com

Karina Lombard (born 21 January 1969) is a Tahitian actress. She appeared as Isabel Two in Legends of the Fall, as chief Nonhelema in Timeless, and as Marina Ferrer in the first season of The L Word, reprising the role as a guest in seasons four and six.

She has also appeared in the films Wide Sargasso Sea and The Firm, and the television series CSI: Crime Scene Investigation, CSI: NY, NCIS, Rescue Me and The 4400.

== Career ==
Lombard's major break in modeling was a photoshoot with a 'Native American' theme. A year later, one of her photographs was chosen for a billboard that led to her first acting role. Photographs of her as a model have appeared in the magazines Elle and Vogue.

Lombard studied acting in New York City at the Lee Strasberg Theatre Institute and the Actors Studio, where she also gained stage experience performing at the Gallery Theatre and Neighborhood Playhouse.

Lombard's first film role was as a princess in L'île (The Island). In 1993, she played her first major role as Antoinette Cosway, a Jamaican heiress, in Wide Sargasso Sea, based on the novel of the same name by Jean Rhys. She had supporting parts in The Firm (1993) and Legends of the Fall (1994), and starred in Last Man Standing (1996) with Bruce Willis.

In the 2000s, she moved to television, appearing in The 4400 and as restaurateur Marina Ferrer in the first season of The L Word. She also played the recurring character Geneviève on FX's Rescue Me.

== Filmography ==
Year	Title	Role
1991	The Doors	Warhol Actress
1993	Wide Sargasso Sea	Antoinette Cosway
1993	The Firm	Girl On Beach
1994	Legends of the Fall	Isabel 'Isabel Two' Decker-Ludlow
1996	Last Man Standing	Felina
1997	Kull the Conqueror	Zareta
1998	Exposé	Amber Collins
2001	Guardian	Katherine Kross
2003	Deception	Margareth de Vries
2004	Big Kiss	Liz
2011	Jo's Boy	Alice Hamilton
2014	United Passions	Linda
2018	Reign of Judges: Title of Liberty	Mahigana
2019	Deal	Jules
2023	The Oath	Mahigana

=== Television ===
Year	Title	Role	Notes
1987	L'île	Ivoa	television mini-series
1998	Early Edition	Sammia Watts	"Mum's the Word"
1998	The Violent Earth	Anna Temaru	television mini-series
1999	The Seventh Scroll	Royan	television mini-series
2000	Murder at the Cannes Film Festival	Inspector Renee Reno	television film
2004	Dr. Vegas	Jessica Rhodes / Black Widow	"All In"
2004–2009	The L Word	Marina Ferrer	main role (Season 1); Guest (seasons 4 and 6)
2005–2006	The 4400	Alana Mareva	main role
2007	The Secrets (miniseries)	Claude Perkins	television mini-series
2007	CSI: Crime Scene Investigation	Pippa Sanchez	"A La Cart"
2009	Rescue Me	Geneviéve Lazard	recurring role (Season 5)
2011	CSI: NY	Eva Martinez	"Holding Cell"
2012	NCIS	Monique Lisson	"The Missionary Position"
2014	Le Family Show	Mayi Rioux	telelvision film
2016	Timeless	Nonhelema	television series

== Awards ==
Year	Award	Category	Work	Result
1997	FAITA Award	Outstanding Performance by an Actress in a movie (lead)	Kull the Conqueror (1997)	Won
2004	FAITA Award	Outstanding Performance by an Actress in a TV series (lead)	The L Word (2004)	Won
2011	FAITA Award	Outstanding Performance by an Actress in a TV Movie/Special (lead)	Murder at the Cannes Film Festival (2000)	Won
