= Salvation City =

2010 novel by American writer Sigrid Nunez

- First edition
- Author: Sigrid Nunez
- Language: English
- Publisher: Riverhead Books
- Publication date: 2010
- Publication place: United States
- Pages: 288
- ISBN: 978-1594485374

Salvation City is a 2010 novel by American writer Sigrid Nunez. The novel follows protagonist Cole Vining after he becomes orphaned by a fictional flu pandemic.

== Writing and development ==
Though the novel was released after the 2009 swine flu pandemic, Nunez began writing it before and did not base the fictional flu pandemic in the novel on the event.

== Reception ==
=== Critical reception ===
In a review for the New York Times, Abraham Verghese praised the book as "[...] satisfying, provocative and very plausible novel". B.C. Edwards, writing for BOMB, referred to the book as "[... ] a work of quiet but very impressive skill".

=== Academic interpretation ===
In The Hudson Review, Tom Wilhelmus compared the book's depiction of Christianity to Margaret Atwood's in The Handmaid's Tale. Wilhelmus wrote: "Salvation City contains [...] a much milder treatment of fundamentalism [...]".

== Renewed attention ==
The novel has received attention during outbreaks of disease after its publication. Torrie Bosch, writing for Slate noted the novel in articles about fictional depictions of pandemic during the Western African Ebola virus epidemic in 2014 and the COVID-19 pandemic in 2020.

Nunez was struck by the similarities between the COVID-19 pandemic and the pandemic depicted in the novel.
