= Scott McGehee and David Siegel =

American filmmakers

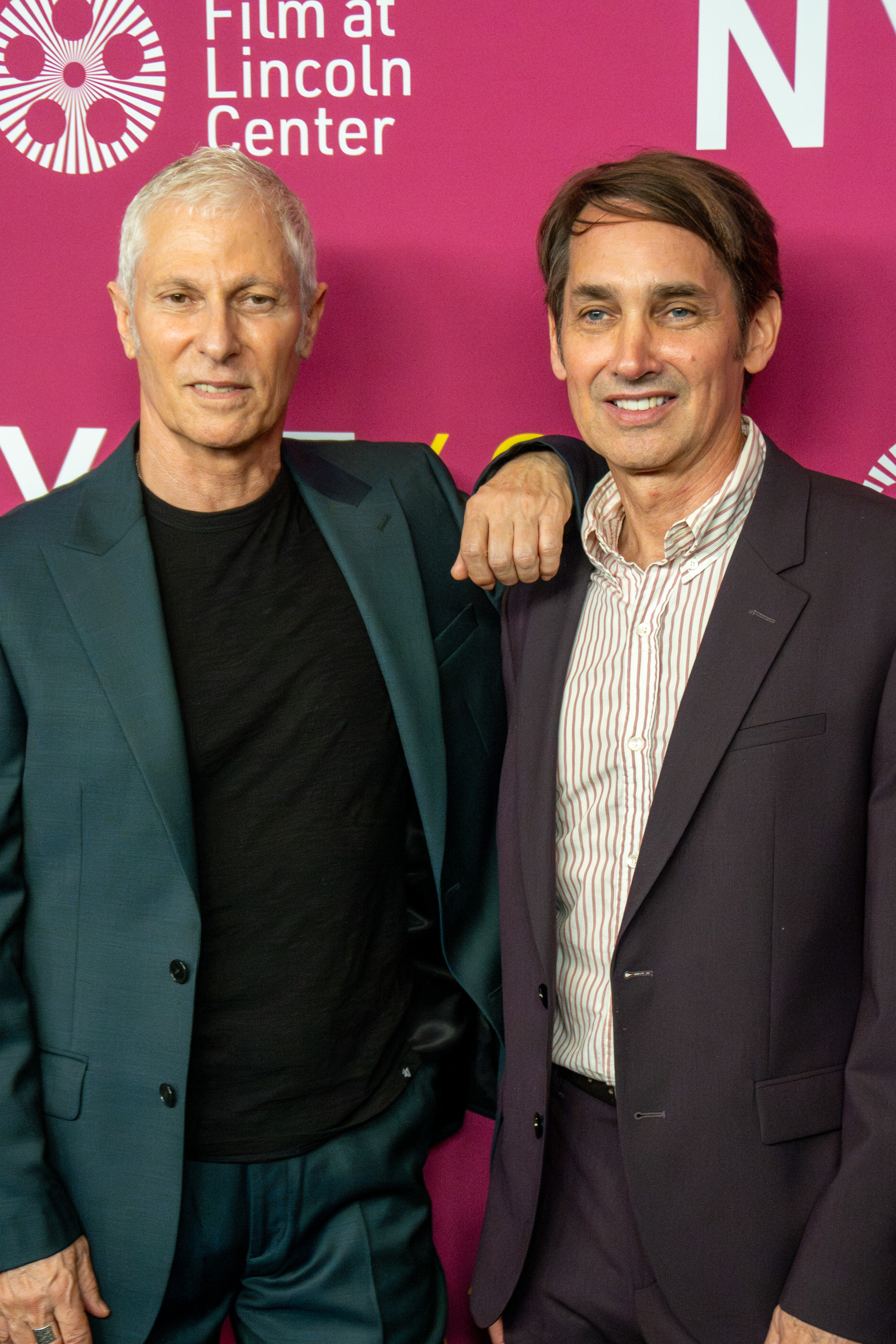
- McGehee (right) and Siegel in 2024
- Born: David Siegel; Brooklyn, New York, U.S.
- Education: University of California, Berkeley (BA), Rhode Island School of Design (MFA)
- Occupation: Filmmaker
- Years active: 1993–present
- Born: Scott McGehee; Garden Grove, California, U.S.
- Education: Columbia University (BA), University of California, Berkeley (MA)
- Occupation: Filmmaker
- Years active: 1993–present

Scott McGehee and David Siegel are an American filmmaking duo. They have made films across different genres and styles, often focusing on emotional stories within a familial structure. They have shared a directing credit on every film since their 1993 debut feature Suture, making their ongoing co-directing collaboration one of the longest in American film.

== Background ==
Siegel was born in Brooklyn, New York, McGehee in Garden Grove, California. Both were raised in Orange County, California, but they did not meet until much later. Neither attended film school. Siegel has a bachelor's degree in Architecture from the University of California, Berkeley, and an MFA from the Rhode Island School of Design. McGehee has a bachelor's degree in English from Columbia University and an MA in Rhetoric from Berkeley, where he studied Film Theory and Japanese Film History. The two were introduced by McGehee's sister, production designer Kelly McGehee, with whom they have also shared an ongoing collaboration.

== Career ==
=== Suture ===
Working out of San Francisco, California, McGehee and Siegel made a pair of short films before focusing on their first feature, Suture. They went into production on Suture without enough funding to complete the project. Steven Soderbergh saw an incomplete rough cut, and helped them raise financing to complete post production. The film premiered at the Telluride Film Festival before screening at Toronto, Sundance, and Cannes ('Un Certain Regard'). Suture was distributed theatrically in 1994 by The Samuel Goldwyn Company.

=== i5 Films ===
After a multi-year period of struggle trying to make films within the studio system, McGehee and Siegel formed independent production company i5 Films with producer Robert Nathan. Based in San Francisco, i5 Films produced four films during its short history. The first, Lush (2000), was the first feature of screenwriter Mark Gibson. The next year, i5 produced both Patrick Stettner's first feature, The Business of Strangers, and McGehee and Siegel's second film, The Deep End. Both premiered in competition at Sundance in 2001.

The Deep End was picked up by Fox Searchlight for theatrical distribution. It had its international premiere in the Directors’ Fortnight at Cannes, and later earned its lead actor, Tilda Swinton, a Golden Globe nomination.

McGehee and Siegel's next film, Bee Season (2004), financed by Fox Searchlight, was the last of their films to be made under the i5 banner. Scripted by Naomi Foner Gyllenhaal, based on Myla Goldberg's novel, Bee Season was the first time the duo directed a script penned by another writer. Bee Season premiered at the Telluride Film Festival, but was a disappointment theatrically.

=== Move to New York ===
In 2004, McGehee and Siegel relocated to New York City to complete post production on Bee Season. Their first film after returning to New York, a low-budget indie called Uncertainty (2008), was a return to the more experimental style of their first feature, Suture. The actors worked from a treatment written by McGehee and Siegel, but improvised their own dialogue after a long rehearsal process. Uncertainty premiered at the Toronto Film Festival and was released by IFC Films.

Their next film, also set in New York, What Maisie Knew (2012), was from a screenplay written by Carroll Cartwright and Nancy Doyne, based on Henry James’ novel. McGehee and Siegel have said they were attracted to the challenge of telling the story from the point of view of the six-year-old main character, Maisie. The film premiered at the 2012 Toronto Film Festival and was distributed theatrically by Millennium Films.

=== Big Creek Projects ===
After several projects failed to get off the ground, McGehee and Siegel once again raised equity financing to produce their next film, Montana Story. They have described writing the screenplay quickly, during the COVID-19 lockdowns of 2020, and then gathering a small group of actors and crew in a remote Montana location to shoot in a safe and controlled environment during the early days of the pandemic. The film premiered at the Toronto Film Festival in 2021, and was released theatrically by Bleecker Street.

Around the same time, the filmmakers formed a new production company, Big Creek Projects, along with producing partner Mike Spreter.

Following Montana Story, Big Creek Projects produced McGehee and Siegel's seventh feature, The Friend (2024), an adaptation of Sigrid Nunez’ National Book Award-winning novel. Big Creek Projects has also produced the work of other independent filmmakers, such as Hailey Gates' debut feature Atropia, which premiered at the 2025 Sundance Film Festival and won the Grand Jury Prize, and Ira Sachs' film The Man I Love, which premiered in competition at the 2026 Cannes Film Festival.

== Frequent collaborators ==
McGehee and Siegel have worked frequently with English director of photography Giles Nuttgens (five films), and production designer Kelly McGehee (six films).

== Personal life ==
McGehee and Siegel both live in New York, NY. Siegel is straight, McGehee is gay.

== Filmography ==
Year	Title	Directors	Producers	Writers
1994	Suture	Yes	Yes	Yes
2000	Lush	No	Yes	No
2001	The Deep End	Yes	Yes	Yes
2005	Bee Season	Yes	No	No
2008	Uncertainty	Yes	Yes	Yes
2012	What Maisie Knew	Yes	No	No
2021	Montana Story	Yes	Yes	Yes
2024	The Friend	Yes	Yes	Yes
2026	The Man I Love	No	Yes	No

Executive producers

- The Business of Strangers (2001)
- Atropia (2025)
