= Deception (2003 film) =

- Directed by: Max Fischer
- Produced by: Michael Grais; Gary Howsam; Pieter Kroonenburg
- Starring: Debi Mazar; Karina Lombard; Jack Langedijk; Marc Lavoine
- Release date: June 4, 2003
- Running time: 91 minutes
- Countries: United States; Canada
- Language: English

Deception is a 2003 film starring Debi Mazar, Karina Lombard, Jack Langedijk and Marc Lavoine.

== Plot ==
Unscrupulous Margaret, whose rich father bankrupted her family and committed suicide, uses her French gigolo boytoy Robert to swindle the fortune from her childhood friend Janet and her wealthy father Max.

== Cast ==
- Karina Lombard as Margareth de Vries
- Jack Langedijk
- Marc Lavoine as Robert Steiner
- Debi Mazar as Janet Steiner
- Daniel Pilon
- Charles Edwin Powell (as Charles Powell)
- Tom Rack as Dr. Lewis
- Jacklin Webb
