= The Friend (2024 film) =

Film by Scott McGehee and David Siegel

- Release poster
- Directed by: Scott McGehee David Siegel
- Screenplay by: Scott McGehee; David Siegel
- Based on: The Friend by Sigrid Nunez
- Produced by: Scott McGehee; David Siegel; Liza Chasin; Mike Spreter
- Starring: Naomi Watts; Bill Murray; Sarah Pidgeon; Carla Gugino; Constance Wu; Ann Dowd
- Cinematography: Giles Nuttgens
- Edited by: Isaac Hagy
- Music by: Jay Wadley; Trevor Gureckis
- Production companies: 3dot Productions; Big Creek
- Distributed by: Bleecker Street (United States and Canada); Universal Pictures and Focus Features (International)
- Release dates: August 30, 2024 (Telluride); March 28, 2025 (United States)
- Running time: 120 minutes
- Country: United States
- Language: English
- Box office: $5.2 million

The Friend is a 2024 American drama film written and directed by Scott McGehee and David Siegel. Based on the 2018 novel by Sigrid Nunez, it stars Naomi Watts, Bill Murray, Sarah Pidgeon, Carla Gugino, Constance Wu, and Ann Dowd.

It had its world premiere at the Telluride Film Festival and screened in the Gala section at the 2024 Toronto International Film Festival and was released theatrically on March 28, 2025 by Bleecker Street.

== Plot ==
Iris is a writer and college professor living in Manhattan coping with the recent suicide of her best friend and mentor, Walter. Through conversations between Iris, Walter's ex-wives, and his adult daughter, we learn of Walter's three troubled marriages and his career as a college professor. At the funeral service, Walter's third wife, Barbara, tells Iris of an issue she needs to discuss with her.

At Barbara's house, she asks Iris to adopt Walter's senior Great Dane, Apollo. Iris agrees to take him in on a temporary basis. The viewer learns through implication of Walter's life as a professor. Iris had been his student, and the two had slept together casually once. While Walter was alive, Iris had been put in charge of writing his biography, but her pace had been slow and plagued by writer's block. Concerned for Iris's lack of movement on the biography, Walter had introduced his daughter, Val, to her and pushed that Val contribute to the biography. In the present, Iris takes Walter's laptop to a technology professional, who recovers Walter's email correspondences. Jerry, Iris's agent, presses Iris on finishing the biography, saying that Walter's sudden death stoked interest in his life as a literary giant.

Bringing Apollo home, Iris faces challenges with the large dog, who seems unresponsive to commands, occupies Iris's bed without leaving, makes a mess of her apartment and literary research materials, and attracts the attention of the apartment building superintendent, Hektor, who gives warnings of the building's rules against dogs before reporting her to the landlords. Iris receives notice that she will be evicted from her rent-controlled apartment. Learning of a Great Dane rescue in Michigan, she drives partway before stopping at a gas station and seeing another pet owner bring his dog inside, despite a sign on the door prohibiting all dogs except service animals. Inspired, Iris realizes her landlord will be unable to evict her if she registers Apollo as an emotional support animal. She drives home and waylays her therapist at his office for a service animal referral. He agrees to do so before asking Iris about her well being and reaction to Walter's death, inviting her to process her grief by having her write a story in which she can speak directly to Walter. Iris's story is autobiographical, substituting the enormous and burdensome Apollo for a far more manageable Dachshund. She angrily confronts Walter about the selfishness of his suicide, especially the impact on Apollo. Realizing the burden of writing the biography, she informs Walter of her decision to drop the project and instead start a new book based on her experiences with him, leaving the biography to be finished by his daughter.

Time passes, and Val shows Iris a beach house on Long Island. The house belongs to Walter's family but is being sold soon. Iris is invited to stay there over the summer with Apollo, who, at age 6, is undergoing the early senescence associated with Great Dogs. His arthritis is becoming more severe, and Iris dreads his eventual death. By this time, Val has finished Walter's biography. Iris stays at the house with Apollo. One day, she sees him lying inertly on the beach. Fearing the worst, Iris approaches before learning that he is only resting.

== Cast ==
- Naomi Watts as Iris
- Bill Murray as Walter
- Bing as Apollo
- Noma Dumezweni as Barbara
- Sarah Pidgeon as Val
- Carla Gugino as Elaine
- Sarah Baskin as Mara
- Constance Wu as Tuesday
- Juliet Brett as Sophie
- Ann Dowd as Marjorie
- Felix Solis as Hektor
- Gina Costigan as Jocelyn
- Owen Teague as Carter
- Josh Pais as Jerry
- Tom McCarthy as Dr. Warren
- Bruce Norris as Dr. Novak
- Ian Lithgow as Larry

== Production ==
In February 2022, it was announced Naomi Watts had joined the cast of the film, with Scott McGehee and David Siegel set to direct from a screenplay they wrote, based upon the 2018 novel of the same name by Sigrid Nunez. In February 2024, Bill Murray, Sarah Pidgeon, Constance Wu, Ann Dowd, Noma Dumezweni, Felix Solis, and Owen Teague joined the cast. In March 2024, Carla Gugino joined the cast. Principal photography began by February 2024, in New York City.

== Release ==
The Friend premiered at the Telluride Film Festival on August 30, 2024, and was also screened in the Gala Presentations section at the Toronto International Film Festival on September 8, 2024. In October 2024, Bleecker Street acquired North American distribution rights to the film, planning to release it sometime in early 2025. The film was released in the United States on March 28, 2025. The film opened the 2nd Croatia International Film Festival on August 8, 2025.

== Reception ==
=== Box office ===
During its first weekend of release, The Friend played in two theaters and grossed $67,629 during the weekend of March 28–30. The following weekend, the film had its wide release and opened alongside A Minecraft Movie, The Chosen: Last Supper Part 2, Hell of a Summer, and The Luckiest Man in America, and grossed $1.6 million, finishing ninth at the box office for the weekend of April 4–6.

=== Critical response ===
On the review aggregator website Rotten Tomatoes, 84% of 148 critics' reviews are positive, with an average rating of 6.9/10. The website's consensus reads: "Leavening its parable of grief with some adorable human-canine bonding, The Friend is a winsome dramedy that'll resonate with pet owners and just about anyone who's experienced loss." Metacritic, which uses a weighted average, assigned the film a score of 70 out of 100, based on 35 critics, indicating "generally favorable" reviews.
