= Suture (film) =

- Theatrical poster
- Directed by: Scott McGehee; David Siegel
- Written by: Scott McGehee; David Siegel
- Produced by: Scott McGehee; David Siegel
- Starring: Dennis Haysbert; Mel Harris; Sab Shimono; Dina Merrill; David Graf
- Cinematography: Greg Gardiner
- Edited by: Lauren Zuckerman
- Music by: Cary Berger
- Distributed by: The Samuel Goldwyn Company
- Release dates: September 14, 1993 (Toronto Festival of Festivals); March 18, 1994 (United States)
- Running time: 96 minutes
- Country: United States
- Language: English
- Budget: $900,000

Suture is a 1993 American thriller film written and directed, and produced by Scott McGehee and David Siegel. It stars Dennis Haysbert and Mel Harris. It was screened in the Un Certain Regard section at the 1994 Cannes Film Festival.

== Plot ==
After murdering his father, wealthy Vincent Towers decides to fake his own death. He plants a car bomb in an attempt to kill a nearly identical half-brother, Clay Arlington, after persuading Arlington to switch identities with him.

Arlington survives, but requires facial reconstruction and also has lost most of his memory. Dr. Renee Descartes is there during his recovery. Towers resurfaces and tries once more to eliminate him, but is killed himself. Arlington makes a decision to make his new identity a permanent one.

== Cast ==
- Dennis Haysbert as Clay Arlington
- Mel Harris as Dr. Renee Descartes
- Sab Shimono as Dr. Max Shinoda
- Dina Merrill as Alice Jameson
- Michael Harris as Vincent Towers
- David Graf as Lt. Weismann
- Fran Ryan as Mrs. Lucerne
- John Ingle as Sidney Callahan
- Sanford Gibbons as Dr. Fuller (as Sandy Gibbons)
- Mark DeMichele as Detective Joe
- Sandra Ellis Lafferty as Nurse Stevens (as Sandra Lafferty)
- Capri Darling as Soprano
- Carol Kiernan as Ticket Agent
- Laura Groppe as Sportswoman
- Mel Coleman as Sportsman

== Production ==
Scott McGehee and David Siegel had been working together since 1989. They had made two short films: "Birds Past" and "Speak Then Persephone" in 1989 and 1990, respectively. Afterwards, they decided to make a feature-length film and "attempted to construct a story that was generally about identity". McGehee has said that Suture was influenced by mid-1960s Japanese films and Hollywood films like North by Northwest. Specifically, they were inspired by Hiroshi Teshigahara's The Face of Another (1966) and Yoshitaro Nomura's Left-Handed Sniper: Tokyo Bay (1962), which utilized widescreen black-and-white cinematography. They also wanted to give the film an early '60s sensibility and loved the widescreen black-and-white films from that period: The Manchurian Candidate and Seconds. Siegel said, "It's an absolutely gripping look that's used so rarely today, and it's a look from a time period that we wanted to evoke".

McGehee and Siegel set up a limited partnership and borrowed money for the $1 million budget from family and friends. They decided to shoot Suture in Phoenix, Arizona because McGehee felt that it was "almost like an abandoned city, it's so large and overbuilt and the streets are so dead it feels empty". They liked the city's "high modernist, very spare aesthetic". After seeing an early rough cut of the film, Steven Soderbergh became fascinated with it and helped McGehee and Siegel find completion finances during post-production.

== Release ==
Suture had its premiere at the 1993 Telluride Film Festival with screenings at the Sundance Film Festival and Toronto Festival of Festivals. A 4K restoration was completed in 2016, and released on Blu-ray by Arrow Video in July 2016.

== Awards ==
- In 1994, Scott McGehee and David Siegel won Best Director at the Sitges - Catalan International Film Festival
- In 1994, Greg Gardiner won the Excellence in Cinematography Award at the Sundance Film Festival
