= Montana Story =

2021 American film by Scott McGehee and David Siegel

- Theatrical release poster
- Directed by: Scott McGehee; David Siegel
- Screenplay by: Scott McGehee; David Siegel
- Story by: Mike Spreter; Scott McGehee; David Siegel
- Produced by: Scott McGehee; David Siegel; Jennifer Roth
- Starring: Haley Lu Richardson; Owen Teague; Gilbert Owuor; Kimberly Guerrero; Eugene Brave Rock; Asivak Koostachin
- Cinematography: Giles Nuttgens
- Edited by: Isaac Hagy
- Music by: Kevin Morby
- Production company: Big Creek
- Distributed by: Bleecker Street (United States); Stage 6 Films (International)
- Release dates: September 12, 2021 (TIFF); May 13, 2022 (United States)
- Running time: 113 minutes
- Country: United States
- Language: English
- Box office: $292,916

Montana Story is a 2021 American drama film written, directed, and produced by Scott McGehee and David Siegel. Starring Haley Lu Richardson and Owen Teague, the film is about siblings returning to their family's ranch in Montana after their father falls into a coma.

It was released in the United States on May 13, 2022, by Bleecker Street.

== Plot ==
Estranged, twenty-something, half-siblings Cal and Erin return to the vast Montana ranch they once called home after their father has fallen into a coma and is now on life support. Erin's mother died in childbirth, while Cal's mother died two years ago. The housekeeper and family friend, Valentina, has been holding down the fort. Kenyan immigrant nurse, Ace (a nickname he uses since people in the United States have trouble pronouncing his real name) has been providing life-sustaining care to the siblings' father. Since their father isn't expected to recover, Cal begins selling and donating the ranch's assets. He has conflicted feelings towards his father, due to past abuse. Erin, who remains angry about the abuse, plans to take the family's elderly horse, Mr. T, back to her home in Hudson Valley, New York.

Cal explains to Ace that, seven years ago, his father was a lawyer who helped cover up a toxic incident at the Copperhead open-pit mine. Erin wrote an article that was published in a local paper, exposing the corruption. Their father violently assaulted her and killed her horse, Pepper. Erin ran away from home that night. Cal tried to track her down, but she actively avoided being found and he eventually stopped looking.

Cal tries to open up to Erin, telling her about his life in Cheyenne, Wyoming, and his goal to be a civil engineer. However, she remains closed off. She decides to purchase an old truck and horse trailer to transport Mr. T, though Cal worries about the reliability of the truck. The seller, Mukki, tells Erin that he's Mohican and his family fled west over time to avoid violence.

The truck breaks down on the road, and the siblings wait for Valentina's son, Joey, to arrive with a tow truck. Erin tells Cal that she's a trained cook who now works in a restaurant that uses every part of the animal. The siblings visit the Copperhead Mine, which Erin compares to the seven circles of Hell in Dante's Inferno. She also meditates on the deceptiveness of the American West's mythology.

During a thunderstorm and resulting power outage, Cal struggles to get a back-up generator working. Since the life support system is down, the siblings' father suffers a heart attack. Ace struggles to keep his patient alive, enlisting Erin to manually pump a bag valve mask to keep her father breathing. After the power returns, Erin is upset that she has saved her father's life. She emotionally confronts Cal about him witnessing their father beating and severely injuring her to the point of hospitalization. She berates him for having not helped her in any way. Cal admits he was afraid to intervene and still feels guilty.

Later that night, when Cal thinks he's alone, he talks to his father about the older man's lack of happiness in life. Erin watches from the doorway as her father flatlines and dies. It's not shown, but heavily implied that Cal disconnected his father from life support. Ace covers for Cal, saying the death was due to the heart attack that occurred during the power outage.

As the siblings go their separate ways, Erin asks Cal to keep in touch and he agrees to do so. Instead of taking Mr. T with her, Erin arranges for him to live on Mukki's ranch with a herd of other horses.

== Cast ==
- Haley Lu Richardson as Erin
- Owen Teague as Cal
- Kimberly Guerrero as Valentina
- Gilbert Owuor as Ace
- Asivak Koostachin as Joey
- Eugene Brave Rock as Mukki

== Production ==
The film was shot in Paradise Valley south of Livingston, Montana during a period of six weeks from November to December 2020 under strict COVID-19 protocols.

The film premiered in the Platform Prize section at the Toronto International Film Festival on September 12, 2021. In November 2021, Bleecker Street acquired U.S. distribution rights to the film.

== Reception ==
In the United States and Canada, the film earned $17,284 from four theaters in its opening weekend, and $19,882 from 24 theaters in its second weekend. After expanding to 290 theaters, it made $98,762 in its third weekend, and $25,953 in its fourth.

On the review aggregator website Rotten Tomatoes, 87% of 88 reviews are positive, with an average rating of 7/10. The website's critical consensus reads, "Montana Story takes a gut-wrenching look at family trauma, brought brilliantly to life by Haley Lu Richardson and Owen Teague." Metacritic, which uses a weighted average, assigned the film a score of 73 out of 100, based on 22 critics, indicating "generally favorable" reviews.
