= Murder at the Cannes Film Festival =

2000 television film

Murder at the Cannes Film Festival is a 2000 television film directed by Harvey Frost, and written by Jeffrey Hatcher, starring French Stewart, Jay Brazeau, Karina Lombard and Bo Derek.

== Reception ==
Variety called it "a clever teleplay".
