= Wide Sargasso Sea (1993 film) =

1993 film

- Theatrical release poster
- Directed by: John Duigan
- Written by: John Duigan; Carole Angier; Jan Sharp (based on the novel by Jean Rhys)
- Produced by: Jan Sharp
- Starring: Karina Lombard; Nathaniel Parker; Claudia Robinson; Michael York; Rachel Ward
- Cinematography: Geoff Burton
- Edited by: Anne Goursaud; Jimmy Sandoval
- Music by: Stewart Copeland
- Distributed by: Roadshow Film Distributors
- Release date: 16 April 1993 (US)
- Running time: 98 minutes
- Country: Australia
- Language: English
- Box office: $1,614,784

Wide Sargasso Sea is a 1993 Australian film directed by John Duigan, and starring Karina Lombard and Nathaniel Parker. It is an adaptation of Jean Rhys's 1966 novel of the same name.

== Premise ==
The novel and film explore Jean Rhys's account of the West Indian Creole heiress, here called Antoinette Cosway, who marries the Englishman Mr. Rochester, and becomes his "madwoman in the attic" featured in the novel Jane Eyre by Charlotte Brontë. For a full-length summary see: plot summary of Wide Sargasso Sea.

== Cast ==
- Karina Lombard – Antoinette Cosway
- Nathaniel Parker – Edward Rochester
- Rachel Ward – Annette Cosway
- Michael York – Paul Mason
- Martine Beswick – Aunt Cora
- Claudia Robinson – Christophene
- Huw Christie Williams – Richard Mason
- Casey Berna – Young Antoinette Cosway
- Rowena King – Amelie
- Ben Thomas – Daniel Cosway
- Naomi Watts – Fanny Grey

== Release ==
Fine Line Features released the film for the United States market. The film was given a restrictive NC-17 rating due to its sexual content. Fine Line opted not to pursue a less restrictive, more marketable R rating.

== Production ==
The screenplay was written by Australian director John Duigan, producer Jan Sharp, and Carole Angier, a Rhys biographer.

John Duigan later said he did not enjoy the experience of making this film:

It was probably the only really unsatisfying interaction that I've had with a production company and I found that I had major disagreements with them and with the producers. It was unfortunate. Jan Sharp, the producer of the film, had the tenacity to get the film made, but she and I had differences of opinion. She was very well informed on the book, and I'm sure her opinions were arguable, as I like to think mine were, but when you have a situation like that, I think the overall project can suffer. I think the film did suffer from that division.

== Reception ==
Before release in the United States, the film was caught up in changing classification rules for films. Largely because it contained full frontal male nudity, as well as erotic content, it was classified as NC-17, which limited the number of theaters that would carry it. It received a largely favorable review by critic Vincent Canby of the New York Times. He describes the lean Gothic romance film as "romantic" but "without soft edges. It is as cool, precise and hard as the Rhys prose." Canby also notes that the casting of Karina Lombard, who is half-Lakota, adds an unstated racial dimension that is not part of the novel.

On the review aggregator website Rotten Tomatoes, 65% of 20 critics' reviews are positive, with an average rating of 5.8/10.

Wide Sargasso Sea grossed $45,806 at the box office in Australia.

== See also ==
- Cinema of Australia
- Wide Sargasso Sea (TV)
