= Lush (film) =

- Directed by: Mark Gibson
- Written by: Mark Gibson
- Produced by: Patrick Dollard; Eileen Jones; Scott McGehee; David Siegel; Robert H. Nathan
- Starring: Campbell Scott; Jared Harris; Laura Linney; Laurel Holloman
- Cinematography: Caroline Champetier
- Edited by: Sarah Flack
- Music by: Barrett Martin
- Production company: i5 Films
- Distributed by: DEJ Productions
- Release date: May 1, 2000 (Sundance Film Festival)
- Running time: 93 minutes
- Country: United States
- Language: English

Lush is a 2000 American comedy-drama film written and directed by Mark Gibson and starring Campbell Scott, Jared Harris, Laura Linney and Laurel Holloman. It is Gibson's directorial debut.

== Plot ==
A professional golfer (Campbell Scott) meets an alcoholic lawyer (Jared Harris) and a divorcée in New Orleans.

== Cast ==
- Campbell Scott as Lionel 'Ex' Exley
- Jared Harris as W. Firmin Carter
- Laura Linney as Rachel Van Dyke
- Laurel Holloman as Ashley 'Ash' Van Dyke
- Nick Offerman as Gerry
- Don Hood as Har
- Joe Chrest as Greg

== Reception ==
The film has a 0% approval rating on Rotten Tomatoes based on 5 reviews.
