= The Oath (2023 film) =

- Directed by: Darin Scott
- Written by: Michelle Scott; Darin Scott
- Produced by: Isen Robbins; Aimee Schoof; Randolf Turrow; Darin Scott
- Starring: Darin Scott; Nora Dale; Karina Lombard; Eugene Brave Rock; Billy Zane
- Cinematography: Brian O'Carroll
- Edited by: Darin Scott
- Music by: Trevor Morris
- Production companies: Great Scott Entertainment; Herculean Pictures
- Distributed by: Allen Media Group
- Release date: December 8, 2023
- Running time: 104 minutes
- Country: United States
- Language: English
- Box office: $509,470

The Oath is a 2023 Ancient American action adventure romance film written by Michelle Scott and Darin Scott, directed by Darin Scott and starring Darin Scott, Nora Dale, Karina Lombard, Eugene Brave Rock and Billy Zane. It is based on the short film Reign of Judges: Title of Liberty.

== Plot ==
The Oath dramatizes stories from the Book of Mormon.

Two brothers who were the descendants of Joseph crossed the ocean for a promised land. Their feuds gives rise to two nations: Nephites and Lamanites.

Moroni is fending for himself in "New America" circa 400 AD.

== Cast ==
- Darin Scott as Moroni
- Billy Zane as King Aaron
- Nora Dale as Bathsheba
- Eugene Brave Rock as Cohor
- Karina Lombard as Mahigana
- Wase Chief as King's Wife
- Philip Niu as Assassin 1
- Aron Stevens as Assassin 2

== Release ==
In October 2023, it was announced that Allen Media Group acquired North American distribution rights to the film, which was released in theaters on December 8, 2023 and on digital and VOD on March 26, 2024.

== Reception ==
The film has a 30% rating on Rotten Tomatoes based on 10 reviews.
