= Okechukwu Okoroha =

Nigerian American football player (born 1990)

No. 10, 6, 8
- Position: Defensive back

Personal information
- Born: March 8, 1990 (age 36); Lagos, Nigeria
- Listed height: 6 ft 0 in (1.83 m)
- Listed weight: 210 lb (95 kg)

Career information
- High school: Roosevelt (Greenbelt, Maryland, U.S.)
- College: Marshall
- NFL draft: 2013: undrafted

Career history
- Portland Thunder (2014–2015); Nebraska Danger (2016–2019)

Career AFL statistics
- Total tackles: 30.5
- Fumble recoveries: 2
- Pass deflections: 2
- Stats at ArenaFan.com

Okechukwu Orlando Okoroha (born March 8, 1990) is a Nigerian former American football defensive back. He played college football at Boston College and Marshall University. Okoroha was also a member of the Portland Thunder of the Arena Football League (AFL) and the Nebraska Danger of the Indoor Football League (IFL).

== Early life ==
Okoroha played high school football at Eleanor Roosevelt High School in Greenbelt, Maryland. He earned Prince George's 4A, Gazette All-County and Maryland Big School All-State honorable mention honors his senior year in 2007. He recorded 70 tackles, including four sacks, in seven games his senior season while missing three games due to an ankle injury. Okoroha also recorded four interceptions, three pass breakups, two forced fumbles, one fumble recover and an 82-yard kickoff return for a touchdown.

== College career ==
Okoroha played for the Boston College Eagles from 2008 to 2010. He appeared in 21 total games for the Eagles, recording 34 tackles, and made six starts in 2010. He was dismissed from the team before the start of the 2011 season for failing a drug test.

Okoroha transferred to play for the Marshall Thundering Herd in 2012, recording 108 tackles, four pass breakups, three tackles for loss and a fumble recovery.

== Professional career ==
Okoroha signed with the AFL's Portland Thunder on July 10, 2014. He played in one game for the Thunder during the 2014 season, recording 1.5 tackles. He played in six games for the team in 2015, recording 29 tackles, two fumble recoveries and two pass breakups. Okoroha became a free agent after the 2015 season.

He signed with the Nebraska Danger of the IFL on March 16, 2016.
