= Tim Jacobs (American football) =

American football player (born 1970)

No. 41, 34
- Position: Cornerback

Personal information
- Born: April 5, 1970 (age 56); Washington, D.C., U.S.
- Listed height: 5 ft 10 in (1.78 m)
- Listed weight: 187 lb (85 kg)

Career information
- High school: Eleanor Roosevelt (Greenbelt, Maryland)
- College: Delaware
- NFL draft: 1993: undrafted

Career history
- Cleveland Browns (1993–1995); Miami Dolphins (1996–1997)

Career NFL statistics
- Tackles: 63
- Interceptions: 2
- Forced fumbles: 2
- Stats at Pro Football Reference

Timothy Jacobs, Jr. (born April 5, 1970) is an American former professional football player who was a cornerback for five seasons in the National Football League (NFL). After playing college football for the Delaware Fightin' Blue Hens, he was signed by the Cleveland Browns as an undrafted free agent in 1993. He played for the Browns from 1993–1995 and the Miami Dolphins from 1996–1997.

== Professional career ==
=== Cleveland Browns ===
Jacobs signed with the Cleveland Browns as an undrafted free agent following the 1993 NFL draft. He was released prior to the start of the 1993 season, but re-signed with the team and played in two games, recording one tackle. As a backup cornerback in 1994, Jacobs recorded two interceptions, including one against Drew Bledsoe of the New England Patriots. He played in 10 games in 1994, recording one start and six tackles. He was re-signed to a one-year contract on July 21, 1995. After he was beaten by Buffalo Bills wide receiver Andre Reed for a 41-yard touchdown on October 2, Jacobs was deactivated the next game. He compiled 23 tackles in the 14 games he played in 1995.

=== Miami Dolphins ===
Jacobs signed with the Miami Dolphins in June 1996. He played in 12 games in 1996, forcing two fumbles and making 10 tackles. In 1997, he played in all 16 games for the Dolphins (starting one), and had 15 tackles. He was re-signed to a one-year contract on April 25, 1998, but was released on August 26, 1998.
