= Last Man Standing (1996 film) =

- Theatrical release poster
- Directed by: Walter Hill
- Screenplay by: Walter Hill
- Based on: Yojimbo (1961 film) by Ryūzō Kikushima; Akira Kurosawa
- Produced by: Walter Hill; Arthur M. Sarkissian
- Starring: Bruce Willis; Christopher Walken; Alexandra Powers; David Patrick Kelly; Karina Lombard; Bruce Dern
- Cinematography: Lloyd Ahern
- Edited by: Freeman A. Davies
- Music by: Ry Cooder
- Production company: Lone Wolf
- Distributed by: New Line Cinema
- Release date: September 20, 1996
- Running time: 101 minutes
- Country: United States
- Language: English
- Budget: $67 million
- Box office: $47.3 million

Last Man Standing is a 1996 American neo-Western action film written, produced and directed by Walter Hill and starring Bruce Willis, Christopher Walken and Bruce Dern.

It is a remake of the 1961 Japanese film Yojimbo by Akira Kurosawa, relocated to the Prohibition-era American South. In the film, a mysterious gunman (Willis) arrives in a small Texas town ruled by warring bootlegger gangs and sets about playing them against each other.

The film was released by New Line Cinema on September 20, 1996. It received mixed reviews and was a commercial disappointment, grossing $47 million against a budget of $67 million.

== Plot ==
During Prohibition, a drifter calling himself John Smith drives into the desolate border town of Jericho, Texas. He stops to let a Mexican woman named Felina cross the street, causing several Irish mobsters to surround and vandalize his car. Their leader, Finn, warns Smith against staring at "Mr. Doyle's property."

Lacking money to get his car fixed, Smith goes to the cowardly Sheriff Ed Galt, who tells him to expect no help. At a local hotel, Smith meets proprietor Joe Monday and learns about the two rival bootlegger gangs fighting for control of Jericho. Walking into Doyle's headquarters at a social club, Smith challenges Finn to a duel and kills him.

Smith offers his services to Fredo Strozzi, the head of Jericho's Italian gang. Giorgio Carmonte, Strozzi's cousin and the son of a prominent Chicago mobster, distrusts Smith, who bribes Strozzi's unhappy mistress Lucy for information and seduces her.

Aided by Ramirez, a corrupt Mexican police lieutenant on Doyle's payroll, Strozzi's gang captures a shipment of foreign liquor meant for Doyle. Smith later quits Strozzi's gang and informs Doyle of Ramirez's betrayal. Doyle's right hand man Hickey travels to Mexico, kills Ramirez and a corrupt Border Patrol officer, and takes Carmonte hostage. Doyle offers to trade for his liquor, but at the exchange he abruptly demands Strozzi's surrender. Strozzi reveals he has kidnapped Felina, forcing Doyle to settle for a hostage swap.

Smith is brought to a meeting with Captain Tom Pickett of the Texas Rangers, who is investigating the Border Patrol officer's murder. He tells Smith he will return in ten days with a squad of Rangers, intending to wipe out both gangs if Smith does not eliminate one of them first. Pickett also warns Smith to leave town before he returns.

Lucy reveals that Strozzi had her ear cut off after she spitefully revealed her affair with Smith. He gives her money and puts her on a bus out of town. Playing on Doyle's obsession with Felina (whose husband sold her to pay a gambling debt) Smith implies that Strozzi will try to kidnap her again and is sent to a safehouse where she is under guard. Smith kills the guards and gives Felina a car. When Doyle and Hickey arrive the next morning, Smith claims he found the men already dead.

Smith's plan goes awry when Hickey learns that Felina was spotted heading towards Mexico. Doyle has Smith beaten and tortured, but later that night he manages to kill his captors and escape. As Doyle rampages through town, Galt tells him Smith is hiding at a roadhouse favored by Strozzi. Galt and Monday smuggle Smith out of town in the sheriff's car. As they pass the roadhouse, Hickey and his men burn it and slaughter the Italians, with Strozzi and Carmonte being killed last.

Smith hides at a church Felina used to pray at. Two days later, Galt arrives and tells him Monday was caught with food and water intended for Smith, and Doyle's men are slowly torturing him to death. Galt then hands over Smith's pistols, which is all the help he is willing to offer. Returning to town, Smith storms Doyle's headquarters and kills all of his men to save Monday. Doyle and Hickey are absent, having gone down to Mexico in a desperate search for Felina; Smith tells Galt he'll be waiting for them at the burnt-out roadhouse.

When they arrive, Doyle offers to make Smith a business partner before Monday shoots him in revenge. Hickey feigns surrender before trying to outdraw Smith, who kills him. Bidding Monday farewell, Smith gets into his car and drives on to Mexico, noting he is no better off than when he came to Jericho but convinced both gangs got what they deserved.

== Cast ==
- Bruce Willis as John Smith, a mysterious gunfighter who gets caught up in a mob war and decides to play both sides. Based on Sanjuro from Yojimbo.
- Christopher Walken as Hickey, Doyle's most feared and cunning gunman. Based on Unosuke from Yojimbo.
- Alexandra Powers as Lucy Kolinski, Strozzi's mistress.
- David Patrick Kelly as Doyle, the boss of Jericho's Irish mob. Based on Ushitora from Yojimbo.
- William Sanderson as Joe Monday, an old innkeeper who shelters Smith and tries to keep him safe from both sides. Based on the character of Gonji from Yojimbo.
- Karina Lombard as Felina, Doyle's mistress. Based on Nui from Yojimbo.
- Ned Eisenberg as Fredo Strozzi, the boss of Jericho's Italian mob. Based on Seibei from Yojimbo.
- Michael Imperioli as Giorgio Carmonte, a Chicago mobster working with Strozzi to expand his operations. Based on Orin from Yojimbo.
- Ken Jenkins as Captain Tom Pickett, a senior Texas Ranger sent to end the violence in Jericho.
- R. D. Call as Jack McCool, a mobster promoted to replace Finn as Doyle's chief enforcer. Based on Inokichi from Yojimbo.
- Leslie Mann as Wanda, a prostitute who lures Smith into a trap soon after he arrives in Jericho.
- Bruce Dern as Sheriff Ed Galt, Jericho's chief lawman who fears both Strozzi and Doyle and tries to steer clear of them. Based on Hansuke from Yojimbo.

== Production ==
=== Development and writing ===
Walter Hill was approached by producer Arthur Sarkassian to remake the Japanese film Yojimbo (1961), which director Akira Kurosawa co-wrote with Ryūzō Kikushima. Hill says, "It took me a long time to be persuaded to do it. I thought the very idea of adapting Mr. Kurosawa was insanity for the obvious reasons. The first movie was very, very good and in addition I would be in the long shadow of Mr. Kurosawa who is probably our most revered filmmaker."

When he learned that Kurosawa was supportive of an American remake, Hill agreed to write and direct on the condition that the film not be a Western (there had already been an unauthorized European remake, the Spaghetti Western A Fistful of Dollars, which had been the subject of litigation). He decided to do it as a 1930s gangster film using techniques of 1940s film noir.

"This is the story of a bad man, who as soon as he arrives begins pushing buttons and doing things only for himself", said Hill. "But we also discover that this man is at a point of spiritual crisis with himself and his own past. And this man decides that maybe he should do one good deed, even if it goes against all the rules of his life as he understands it ... The action and the violence must be organic to the story being told. I think this is obviously by its nature a very dark and very hard movie, so I think it would be dishonest to tell the story and present the physicality in a softer way. Besides, I don't think this is the most brutal film imaginable. There's actually very little blood other than in the sequence where Bruce gets beaten up."

He admitted the film was not realistic: "I don't think anything akin to the social realism movies of the 1930s is being attempted...we're into a 'once upon a time' mythic-poetic situation." The style of the film also drew upon the heroic bloodshed films of Hong Kong filmmaker John Woo, in particular its stylized action sequences. Hill had previously been attached to direct an American remake of Woo's film The Killer (1989).

Hill signed to make the project in 1994. The film was green lit by New Line Cinema's head of production Michael De Luca who allocated a $40 million budget. The film was known by several titles including Gundown, then Gangster, then "Welcome to Jericho."

Hill later said that he and Bruce Willis "were not close when we did the film" but "I liked working with him. It was impersonal. Classic, 'I know what you mean. You want me to be a Bogart, Mitchum kind of guy' and I said 'Exactly. Let it happen.' He then took that and gave what I thought was a very good performance. I always sensed there was a kind of core resentment that Bruce felt he should be more appreciated for his talents. At the same time I think there is a limitation, that he does certain things better than others, and he hasn't always chosen so wisely."

Hill's original cut of the movie was over two hours long. This rough cut was used to edit the trailers for the movie, which contain a lot of alternate/deleted footage including an additional shootout between the two gangs and an alternate ending in which Hickey's death is more drawn-out and brutal. Some of these deleted scenes survive in promotional stills and pictures.

== Reception ==
=== Box office ===
Last Man Standing was a box-office bomb, grossing $18.1 million domestically (United States and Canada), and $29.2 million in other territories, for a worldwide total of $47.3 million, against a budget of $67 million.

=== Critical response ===
On the review aggregator website Rotten Tomatoes, 41% of 34 critics' reviews are positive, with an average rating of 5.5/10. The website's consensus reads: "Last Man Standing's brooding atmosphere and bursts of artfully arranged action prove intriguing yet ultimately insufficient substitutes for a consistently compelling story." Metacritic, which uses a weighted average, assigned the film a score of 44 out of 100, based on 24 critics, indicating "mixed or average" reviews. Audiences polled by CinemaScore gave the film an average grade of "C+" on an A+ to F scale.

Critic Roger Ebert gave the film one out of four stars, calling it "a desperately cheerless film, so dry and laconic and wrung out... The victory at the end is downbeat, and there is an indifference to it. This is such a sad, lonely movie."
