= Rob Davis (gridiron football) =

Player of American and Canadian football

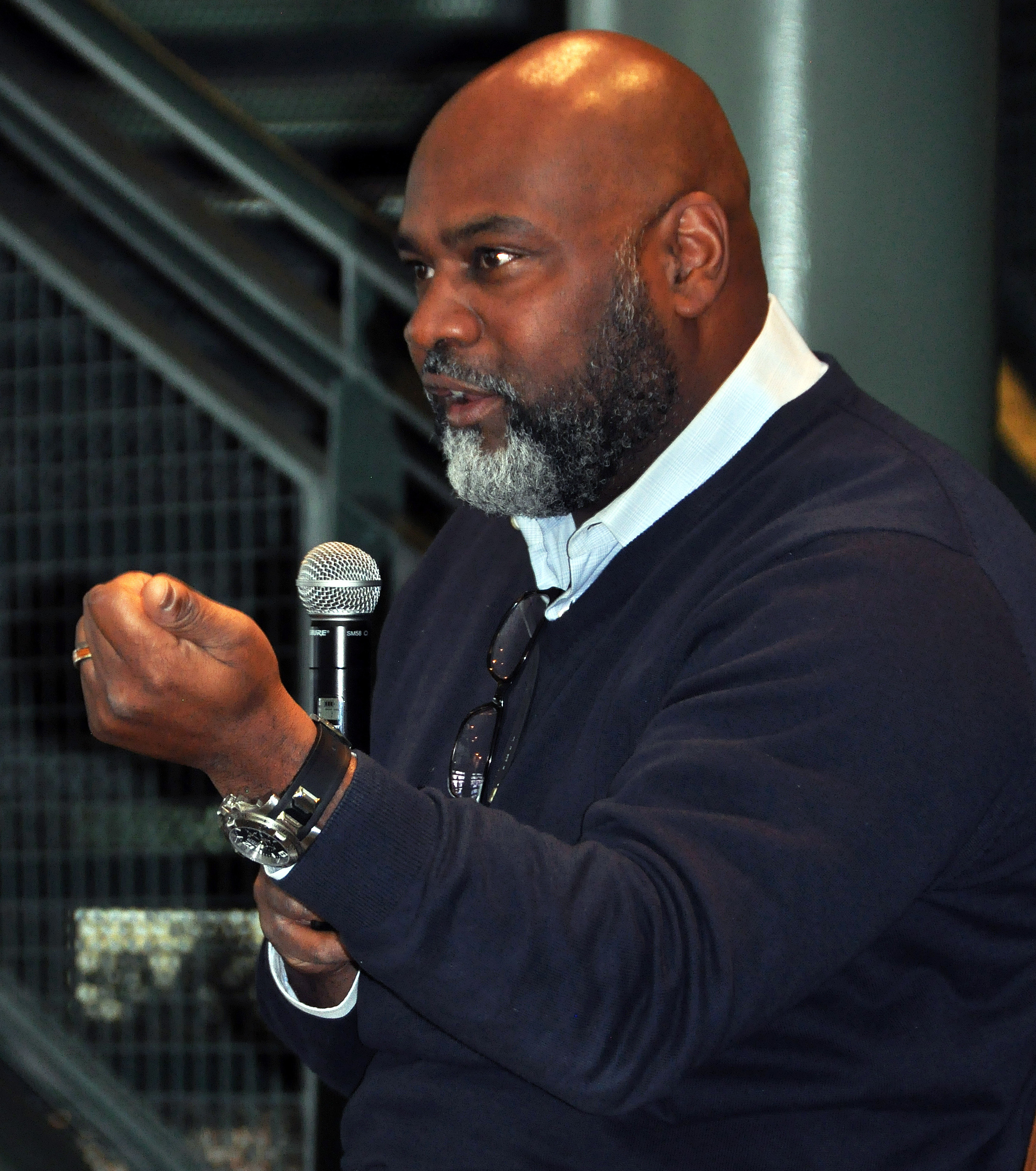
- Davis at Lambeau Field in 2015

Las Vegas Raiders
- Title: Vice president of player engagement

Personal information
- Born: December 10, 1968 (age 57); Washington, D.C., U.S.
- Listed height: 6 ft 3 in (1.91 m)
- Listed weight: 284 lb (129 kg)

Career information
- High school: Eleanor Roosevelt (Greenbelt, Maryland)
- College: Shippensburg
- NFL draft: 1993: undrafted

Career history

Playing
- New York Jets (1993–1994)*; Baltimore Stallions (1995); Kansas City Chiefs (1996)*; Chicago Bears (1996); Green Bay Packers (1997–2007)
- * Offseason or practice squad member only

Coaching
- Dallas Cowboys (2020–2022) Assistant head coach

Operations
- Green Bay Packers (2008–2017) Director of player development; Green Bay Packers (2023–2024) Director of organizational development and diversity, equity, and inclusion; Las Vegas Raiders (2025–present) Vice president of player engagement

Awards and highlights
- Grey Cup champion (1995)

Career NFL statistics
- Games played: 183
- Tackles: 34
- Forced fumbles: 1
- Fumble recoveries: 1
- Stats at Pro Football Reference

Robert Emmett Davis (born December 10, 1968) is an American former professional football long snapper in the National Football League (NFL) who is the vice president of player engagement for the Las Vegas Raiders of the National Football League (NFL). He was originally signed by the New York Jets as an undrafted free agent in 1993. He played college football for the Shippensburg Raiders.

Davis was also a member of the Baltimore Stallions, Kansas City Chiefs, Chicago Bears and Green Bay Packers during his career. He played the 11 seasons with the Packers before retiring following the 2007 season and joining the organization's front office.

== Early life ==
Davis attended Eleanor Roosevelt High School in Greenbelt, Maryland and was a letterman in football and wrestling. He graduated from Eleanor Roosevelt High School in 1986.

== College career ==
Davis attended Shippensburg University, where he started as defensive tackle. He graduated in 1992 with a degree in criminal justice, and is one of only five Shippensburg alumni to play in the NFL.

== Professional career ==
=== Early career ===
Davis was signed as an undrafted free agent by the New York Jets, but failed to make the team's roster.

In 1995 Davis played with the Baltimore Stallions of the Canadian Football League. He was the team's starting long snapper.

In 1996 Davis was signed by the Kansas City Chiefs, but was cut before the season started.

The Chicago Bears signed him that year, and Davis played all 16 games as a long snapper.

=== Green Bay Packers ===
In 1997 the Green Bay Packers signed Rob Davis as a free agent. He started the final seven games of the season, as well as the playoffs and Super Bowl XXXII. Davis was the last remaining Packers player aside from Brett Favre who played in Super Bowl XXXII, and was also one of three Player Representatives for the National Football League Players Association on the Packers roster.

Davis officially retired from the NFL on March 26, 2008.

== Post-playing career ==
Upon retiring from the NFL, Davis joined the Packers' staff as Director of Player Development. While working with the Packers, he earned his master's degree in Applied Leadership for Teaching & Learning at the University of Wisconsin-Green Bay in 2013.

Davis worked for a subsidiary of Oshkosh Corporation, Pierce Manufacturing, as its senior director of people and culture, helping to lead the company's “people first” culture.

Davis also coached the defensive line at St. Norbert College, with an added focus on player development.

He left the Oshkosh Corporation in January 2020 to join former Packers head coach Mike McCarthy with the Dallas Cowboys organization.

Davis was among five Cowboys coaches let go at the conclusion of the 2022 season.
