= Bee Season (film) =

2005 film by Scott McGehee and David Siegel

- Theatrical release poster
- Directed by: Scott McGehee; David Siegel
- Screenplay by: Naomi Foner Gyllenhaal
- Based on: Bee Season by Myla Goldberg
- Produced by: Albert Berger; Ron Yerxa
- Starring: Richard Gere; Juliette Binoche
- Cinematography: Giles Nuttgens
- Edited by: Lauren Zuckerman
- Music by: Peter Nashel
- Production company: Regency Enterprises
- Distributed by: Fox Searchlight Pictures
- Release date: November 11, 2005
- Running time: 104 minutes
- Country: United States
- Languages: English; Hebrew
- Budget: $14 million
- Box office: $6.9 million

Bee Season is a 2005 American drama film adaptation of the 2000 novel by Myla Goldberg. The film was directed by Scott McGehee and David Siegel and written by Naomi Foner Gyllenhaal. It stars Richard Gere and Juliette Binoche.

== Plot ==
Saul Naumann is a somewhat controlling Jewish husband and father. A Religious Studies professor at UC Berkeley, Saul wrote his graduate thesis on the Kabbalah. Because he was a devout Jew, his wife Miriam converted to Judaism when they married, and he nurtured his son Aaron as a traditional studious Jew like himself. When daughter Eliza wins her class spelling bee, they embark on a course of Kabbalah study to help her win. The film follows the family and the spiritual quests upon which they journey, in large part because of Saul: Miriam's attempt to make herself whole, Aaron's religious uncertainty, and Eliza's desire to be closer to her father.

Miriam lives a secret life throughout her entire marriage to Saul, trying to fulfill the religious idea she learned from him, tikkun olam, or "repairing the world" and "reuniting its shards." In momentary flashbacks by Miriam, we glimpse a scene of a crashed car with shattered glass, apparently the basis of an underlying hurt she has been suffering since childhood, perhaps the death of her parents. The beautiful life she had before the accident, symbolized by the kaleidoscope she always carried as a child, through which she was presented with its beautiful view of the world, is suddenly shattered when the accident occurred. Thereafter, seeking to restore the broken shards, Miriam compulsively creates beautiful light gathering objects (sometimes stealing them) and storing them in a secret warehouse.

Saul's son, Aaron, grows unsure of the Judaism foisted on him by his father, and in trying to find a faith he personally believes in, he becomes a Hare Krishna after meeting a woman named Chali in the park. For Eliza, her experience begins with a desire to be as close to her father as Aaron is; the two would often have discussions about Judaism and play music together. Saul's graduate thesis on Kabbalah writer Abraham Abulafia (who believed that careful analysis of words could lead to contact with God) brings Saul and Eliza closer together when Saul learns Eliza has won the district spelling bee.

Upon learning of her success, Saul takes control of Eliza's life, coaching her in the Kabbalistic teachings he knows so well. Eliza enjoys the renewed attention of her father and pursues the competition for her father's involvement. This comes at the expense of Aaron, who receives less time with Saul, even as he falls deeper into religious questioning. At the center of the film, Eliza becomes Saul's newest religious project. Eliza continues to do well at spelling bees, utilizing her spiritual gift, as Abraham Abulafia described: visions appear to her and help her spell words no matter how difficult.

Saul's obsession with his daughter's gift and the opportunities it presents to him consume him to the point that he is callously ignorant of the collapse of his family around him — his son's interest in Hinduism, which soon comes between him and his father, and his wife's psychological problems suddenly thrust upon him.

The night before the final round of the spelling bee, Eliza uses her father's notes on Abulafia's system to obtain "the ear of God," allowing God to flow through her. Her body convulsing epileptically on the floor, Eliza apparently makes that mystical connection, providing her the healing power of God. In the final scene, Eliza, on the verge of winning the national spelling bee, and now empowered with the ability to heal her family, deliberately misspells the word origami, thereby losing the competition. Immediately upon her sacrifice, healing apparently takes place between Saul and Aaron as they embrace and openly express loving emotion; and Miriam, watching the competition on television from a sanitarium (where she has been following her arrest and the subsequent discovery of her secret), is apparently in the process of being healed as well.

== Cast ==
- Richard Gere as Saul
- Juliette Binoche as Miriam
- Flora Cross as Eliza
- Max Minghella as Aaron
- Kate Bosworth as Chali

== Production ==
The regional bee was filmed at the Albany High School gym. Also seen is the downtown section on Park Street in Alameda, California.

While the literal plot simply follows a girl from a somewhat dysfunctional family moving through the world of competitive spelling, the actual plot of Bee Season is a much more complex one on personal religious views. Saul can be seen as a Kabbalistic figure, desperately trying to come closer to God while remaining oblivious to Eliza's natural gift for connecting to God, and to his family's deepening troubles. Instead of using knowledge (as one does in Kabbalah), Saul uses each of his family members in a (mostly vain) attempt to deepen his own religious sense (an act finally uncovered by Aaron near the film's end). Meanwhile, his wife, Miriam, is caught stealing and is sent to a mental institution. The relationships amongst all members of the family, which were shallow and disconnected to begin with, fall apart. But family healing is implied in the final scene in which Eliza purposely loses the National Spelling Bee, a sacrifice drawing upon the spiritual connection she made the night before.

== Reception ==
Rotten Tomatoes gives the film a score of 44% based on 107 reviews, with an average rating of 5.46/10. The consensus reads, "Bee Season is an intelligent, but frustratingly distant and diffuse drama about family dysfunction." Metacritic gives the film as score of 54% based on reviews from 32 critics.

As of January 29, 2006, Bee Season had taken a gross of $1,177,082 in the United States, with an opening American weekend of $120,544.

Bee Season's single award nomination was a Broadcast Film Critics Association Awards Young Actress nomination for Flora Cross.

== Home media ==
The DVD was released in the US on April 4, 2006.

== See also ==
- Akeelah and the Bee - a similar film from 2006
- Bad Words (film) – black comedy on a similar theme
- Bruno (2000 film) – also in context of spelling bees
- List of American films of 2005
