= The Friend (novel) =

2018 novel by Sigrid Nunez

- First edition cover
- Author: Sigrid Nunez
- Language: English
- Publisher: Riverhead Books
- Publication date: 6 February 2018
- Publication place: United States
- Pages: 224
- ISBN: 978-0735219441
- OCLC: 981507732
- Dewey Decimal: 813/.54
- LC Class: PS3564.U485 F75 2018

The Friend is a novel by American writer Sigrid Nunez published by Riverhead Books in 2018. The book concerns an unnamed novelist who adopts a Great Dane that belonged to a deceased friend and mentor.

== Writing and publishing ==
Nunez was inspired to write the novel in part due to acquaintances and friends convinced their lives would end by suicide. A friend of Nunez's died by suicide as she was writing The Friend. Nunez also drew inspiration from Elizabeth Hardwick's novel Sleepless Nights.

The novel contains autobiographical elements, and is written in a hybrid style, which Nunez has said allowed for "essay writing" and "meditation" within the book.

== Plot summary ==
The unnamed narrator, a writer living in Manhattan, recalls the life and recent suicide of her best friend and mentor, also unnamed. Addressing him in the second person, she recounts her friend's three troubled marriages and his career as a college professor. The narrator reveals that the main point of contention between her and her friend involved his illicit affairs with his female students. The narrator meets with her friend's third wife, who asks her to adopt her friend's senior Great Dane, Apollo. The wife, whom the narrator calls "Wife Three", explains that Apollo appears to be in mourning and has been temporarily placed in a kennel. Recalling the story of Hachikō, the narrator reluctantly agrees to take Apollo in.

Though dogs are prohibited in her building, the narrator thinks of a New York law regarding the keeping of pets in apartments: that, if a tenant openly keeps a dog in an apartment for a period of three months, and during those three months the landlord does not take action to evict the tenant, the tenant may legally keep the dog. Though the narrator's building superintendent, Hector, tells her to get rid of Apollo, the narrator hopes Hector will not inform the landlord within the three months.

In her free time, the narrator teaches a writing workshop at a center for victims of human trafficking. As she reads the work of the victims and cares for Apollo, she recalls several films and novels with themes of suffering, suicide, and human-canine bonds, including the films Lilya 4-ever and White God, and the novels Disgrace (a particular favorite of her friend) and My Dog Tulip. As the narrator forms a stronger bond with Apollo, Hector reveals that he has told the landlord about her dog. As the narrator becomes more withdrawn, it becomes evident that her eviction is likely, and her friends and relatives attempt an intervention. The friend's second wife, "Wife Two," finally offers to take Apollo so the narrator can keep her apartment. To the dismay of her friends, the narrator refuses.

She begins reading Letters to a Young Poet aloud to Apollo, finding that it soothes him, and recalls author Rainer Maria Rilke's definition of love: "... two solitudes that protect and border and greet each other." Inspired, and with her therapist's approval, the narrator registers Apollo as an emotional support animal, enabling her to keep the apartment.

The narrator notices Apollo's arthritis becoming more severe, and dreads his eventual death. She imagines a final conversation between her and her friend, in which she tells him that she is writing a novel about him. Though the narrator says that she's changed key details, her friend is upset, and asks her to reassure him that nothing bad will happen to the dog.

Sometime in the near future, the narrator is taking a summer vacation in Long Island with Apollo, who is now very sick. From the porch, she listens to the ocean and watches Apollo, lying in the grass. She sees a swarm of white butterflies moving across the lawn, and thinks that they should watch out for Apollo, who could take out most of them with one bite. However, the butterflies land on Apollo, and the dog does not move. The narrator realizes what has happened, and, in the last sentence of the novel, mourns, "Oh, my friend, my friend!"

== Reception ==
=== Critical reception ===
Overall, the novel received mostly positive reviews. Critics praised the depiction of the relationship between the narrator and her adopted dog.

Nunez said that she was surprised by the response to the novel, in part because her other works have not received as much attention.

Heller McAlpin, writing for NPR, describes how "Nunez deftly turns this potentially mawkish story into a penetrating, moving meditation on loss, comfort, memory, what it means to be a writer today, and various forms of love and friendship — including between people and their pets. All in a taut 200 pages." Similarly, Lidija Haas of Harper's Magazine writes how "Sigrid Nunez’s sneaky gut punch of a novel, is a consummate example of the human-animal tale. It presents itself as a thinly fictionalized grief memoir in which an unnamed, Nunez-like writer, after the suicide of her beloved mentor, adopts his heartbroken Great Dane, Apollo." Haas continues, noting that "The Friend's tone is dry, clear, direct — which is the surest way to carry off this sort of close-up study of anguish and attachment. More for aesthetic than for moral reasons, the narrator gives up her attempt to write about a group of traumatized women with whom she’s been volunteering to slowly, painfully, construct instead the book we’re reading. Someone is being played here, but whether the game is at the reader’s expense or the subject’s (the dead mentor’s) remains deliberately unclear. Part of the tease involves the question of whether 'something bad' is going to happen to the dog."

=== Honors ===
The novel won the National Book Award for Fiction. In 2024, it was ranked #68 in the New York Times list of best 100 books of the 21st century.

== Film adaptation ==
The Friend was adapted into a film directed by Scott McGehee and David Siegel, and starring Naomi Watts as the narrator.
