= Little Star Journal =

American magazine

Little Star Journal is an annual print literary magazine founded in 2009 by Ann Kjellberg, founder of the book-reviewing newsletter Book Post, long-time editor at The New York Review of Books, and the literary executor of the poet Joseph Brodsky. Little Star appeared in seven print issues between 2007 and 2017.

Little Star featured the work of Derek Walcott, Wisława Szymborska, Seamus Heaney, Les Murray, Ann Beattie, Sigrid Nunez, Charles Simic, Gary Snyder, Marilyn Hacker, Tomasz Różycki, Alice Fulton, Jean Valentine, James Kelman, Padgett Powell, Paul Muldoon, Jamaica Kincaid, Adam Zagajewski, Eliot Weinberger, C. K. Williams, Mark Strand, Caleb Crain, Lydia Davis, Carl Phillips, Joy Williams, Rowan Ricardo Phillips, W. G. Sebald, Durs Grünbein, and Tim Parks, among others. John Banville called it, “A very fine venture indeed, everything such a magazine should be.”

From 2013 to 2015, Little Star published a weekly app version, Little Star Weekly, with the app platform 29th Street Publishing. Little Star Weekly also featured music and art edited by Alex Ross, Mary Weatherford, and John Zinsser, among others.

The magazine is rooted in book culture and the reflective traditions of a number of well-remembered hand-held journals of the past, such as The Criterion, The Partisan Review, Antaeus. It was the agility of digital reproduction and the reach of literary blogging and social networking that prompted editors to frame a print tradition with mixed-media.

The magazine takes its name from a line from Joseph Brodsky: "But soon, I’m told, I’ll lose my epaulets altogether / and dwindle into a little star."

== History ==
Little Star was established by Ann Kjellberg. She was joined by the poet Melissa Green as contributing editor.

== Reception ==
Little Star was reviewed on the blogs of The New Yorker, The Paris Review, The New York Times' T Magazine, USA Today's Character Approved, and Paste. A story by Padgett Powell, Manifesto, was excerpted in the June 2010 issue of Harper's.

Review of Little Star #7 by Craig Ledoux, New Pages, November 18, 2018

“In the Beginning,” by Eliot Weinberger, excerpted from Little Star #6 in Harper’s, February 2015

“That New New Lit: Kicking off 2015 (and the best of 2014),” by Jacob Kaplan, Impose, January 6, 2015

“Round-Down: A Look at the Crowded Literary Journal Landscape,” by Peter Kispert, Ploughshares blog, December 23, 2014

“That New New Lit: November,” by Jacob Kaplan, Impose, November 12, 2104

“Black Balloon Publishing’s Favorite Literary Magazines,” by Michelle King, The Airship, Black Balloon, June 27, 2014

“Ghazal,” by Marilyn Hacker, from Little Star #5, receives, Pushcart Prize for 2013

“Literary MagNet News and Trends,” by Travis Kurowsky, Poets & Writers, March/April 2014

“The Mission,” by Joy Williams, excerpted from Little Star #5 in Harper’s, February 2014

“Word for Word: ‘Little Star’ journal and app shining bright,” by Anakana Schofield, Irish Times, January 11, 2014

What I am reading (Anakana Schofield), by Ian McGillis, Montreal Gazette, July 5, 2013

“Literary Heirs,” by Stephen Heyman, T Magazine culture section, New York Times blog, February 10, 2012

“Writing Adrift in the World,” by Tim Parks, New York Review blog, January 19, 2012

Staff Picks: Robyn Cresswell, Paris Review Daily, November 4, 2011

“Mark Strand, Jamaica Kincaid, and Ian Frazier Help Launch Little Star #2,” by Jeannie Vanasco New Yorker Book Bench, May 10, 2011

Three pieces by Lydia Davis, from Little Star #1, receive, Pushcart Prize for 2011

“A Little Star is Born,” by Jessa Crispin, “Need to Know on PBS,” January 4, 2011

Editor Ann Kjellberg on The Leonard Lopate Show, WNYC, December 21, 2010

An NYRB Staff Favorite (Eve Bowen), Typepad, New York Review Books, December 31, 2010

“Afraid to be men,” excerpt from “Manifesto” in Little Star #1, by Padgett Powell, Harper’s, June 2010

“The Booky Man: Little Star and Loose Change,” by Charles McNair, Paste Magazine, March 11, 2010

“Welcome, Welcome Little Star,” by Joseph Hutchison, “The Perpetual Bird,” June 4, 2010

“Catching Up with Little Star,” by Daniel Nester, “We Who Are About To Die,” August 8, 2010

“Best of the Bunch,” by Daniel Hartlay, “Thinking Blue Guitars,” May 5, 2010
