= Bee Season =

2000 novel by Myla Goldberg

- Author: Myla Goldberg
- Language: English
- Genre: Novel
- Publisher: Bantam Doubleday Dell Publishing Group
- Publication date: 25 May 2000
- Publication place: United States
- Media type: Print (hard & paperback)
- Pages: 304 (hardback edition)
- ISBN: 0-385-49879-9 (hardback edition)
- OCLC: 42641634
- Dewey Decimal: 813/.54 21
- LC Class: PS3557.O35819 B44 2000
- Followed by: Wickett's Remedy (2005)

Bee Season is a 2000 novel by Myla Goldberg. It follows a young girl as she attempts to win the national spelling bee, and the repercussions of her success on the other members of her family.

== Plot summary ==
Eleven-year-old Eliza Naumann is the only "ordinary" member in a family of gifted people living in Abington Township, Montgomery County, Pennsylvania. Her father Saul is a cantor at the local synagogue and a keen student of Jewish texts; her mother Miriam is apparently a successful lawyer and her brother Aaron is a gifted student who is able to read and recite in Hebrew and is allowed into his father's study, where he plays the guitar with his father.

One day Eliza surprises herself by winning the class spelling bee, then the school bee at McKinley Elementary School. At first Saul is unaware of her success, but then he becomes increasingly involved with her. Eliza is invited into his study to practice, and Aaron for the first time finds the door closed to him. But as Eliza progresses through the district bee and prepares for the national bee, the troubled lives of her family come into sharp focus. Saul, who has tried to reach God, first through drugs and then through study, becomes convinced that Eliza's talent shows a propensity for mysticism greater than his, which has the potential to lead her to shefa, the influx of the Divine. He gradually introduces her to the writings of Abraham Abulafia, a Medieval kabbalist writer, and it becomes clear that his ambitions for her go far beyond the winning of the spelling bee.

Aaron, who had a "religious experience" at the age of eight (it was actually the wing-light of a plane), finds himself disillusioned with Judaism and begins to look elsewhere, first to Christianity and then to Buddhism. Through a chance encounter in a park he discovers the International Society for Krishna Consciousness (ISKCON) and becomes a devotee, unknown to his family. Miriam, who has always had an obsessive personality, has kept from her family that she has not worked for years, instead being a kleptomaniac who spends her time stealing small items from department stores, believing that they are small parts of herself from which she has become separated, a concept she formed when Saul told her about tikkun olam, the "fixing of the world".

With the other members of her family preoccupied, Miriam's obsession takes a new turn when she finds herself entering people's houses and stealing small objects from them. Several times she is almost discovered, but, though she tries to anchor herself to the real world through emotionally detached sex with Saul, she cannot resist the pull of the empty houses. At the National Spelling Bee, Eliza performs well but does not win, so she begins to prepare for the following year, with Saul's enthusiastic help. But the family is about to be torn apart. Miriam is arrested and Saul learns she quit her job years ago. She has been putting her stolen items into a storage space, where she has arranged them all in a beautiful, complex pattern. She pleads not guilty by reason of insanity, and is admitted to a psychiatric hospital. Aaron announces his intention to leave home, and his faith, to join ISKCON.

Eliza, who has begun reading Abulafia on her own, without her father's knowledge, has a terrifying experience on the night that she attempts to achieve shefa. The following day, at the class spelling bee, she deliberately misspells a word.

== Characters ==
- Eliza Naumann – a young girl, an entrant in the national spelling bee.
- Saul Naumann – Eliza's father, cantor in the Beth Amicha synagogue and student of the scriptures.
- Miriam Naumann – Eliza's mother, who is obsessive-compulsive and a kleptomaniac.
- Aaron Naumann – Eliza's brother, who loses the Jewish faith and goes on to become a Hare Krishna.

== Reception ==
Bee Season was well received by critics. Paul Gray of Time called it "a winningly eccentric and intriguing first novel." Dwight Garner of The New York Times called it "a dispassionate, fervidly intelligent book ... that comes by its emotion honestly" and described it as Kaaterskill Falls meets American Beauty. It reached number 15 in the New York Times independent fiction bestseller list in July, 2000.

Reviewers have commented on how the book begins on a simple note (girl unexpectedly wins a school contest), and later moves into dark territory (family falls apart). In a 2005 interview at her college alma mater, Goldberg explained her motivation: "I'll tell you how I wrote the book. I did write it very consciously to get darker and stronger as it continues. I wanted it at first to be like this sunny, happy, Reader's Digest kind of read, and to lull people into this sense of complacency and then hit them over the head."

== Awards and nominations ==
It was a finalist in the Frankfurt eBook Award 2000 for Best Fiction work converted from print to ebook.

== Film adaptation ==
A feature film based on the book, directed by Scott McGehee and David Siegel with screenplay by Naomi Foner, was released in 2005.

== Cultural references ==
The Decemberists' "Song for Myla Goldberg" from the album Her Majesty the Decemberists makes references to the novel. The band's frontman and songwriter Colin Meloy served as a guide for Goldberg when her book tour for Bee Season visited Portland, Oregon.
