= Myla Goldberg =

American novelist

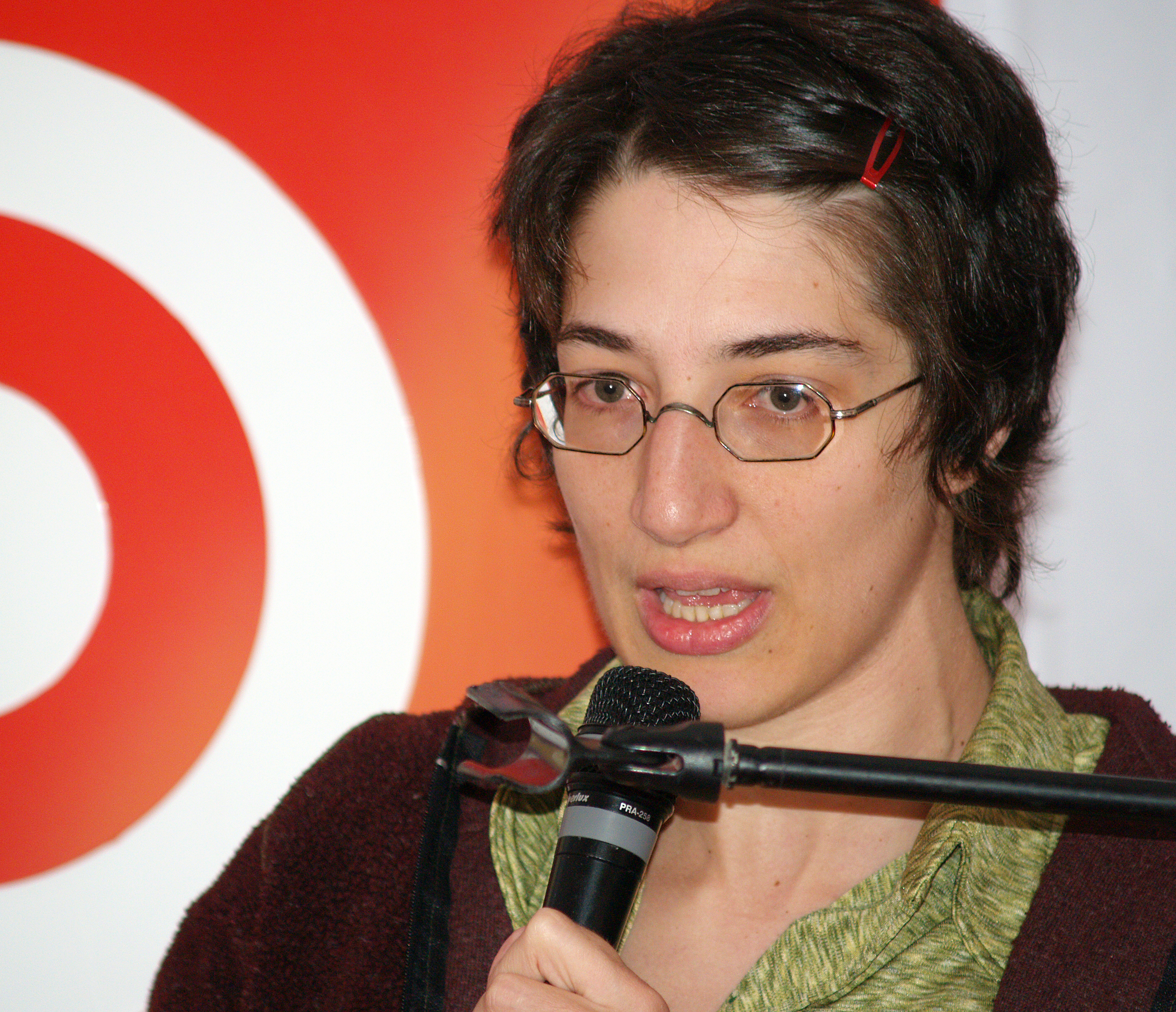
- Goldberg at the 2007 Brooklyn Book Festival
- Born: November 19, 1971 (age 54)
- Education: Eleanor Roosevelt High School; Oberlin College
- Occupations: Novelist; musician
- Spouse: Jason Little
- Children: 2

Myla Goldberg (born November 19, 1971) is an American novelist and musician.

== Biography ==
Goldberg was born into a Jewish family. She was raised in Laurel, Maryland, and graduated from Eleanor Roosevelt High School, where she was one of the Scholastic Art & Writing Awards winners in 1989. She majored in English at Oberlin College, graduating in 1996. She spent a year teaching and writing in Prague (providing the germ of her book of essays Time's Magpie, which explores her favorite places within the city), then moved to Brooklyn, New York, where she still lives with her husband (Jason Little) and two daughters.

Goldberg is an accomplished amateur musician. She plays the banjo and accordion in a Brooklyn-based indie rock quartet, The Walking Hellos. She has performed with The Galerkin Method and the Bindlestiff Family Cirkus. She formerly collaborated with the New York art collective Flux Factory. She has contributed song lyrics to the musical group One Ring Zero.

== Career ==
Myla Goldberg talks about The False Friend on Bookbits radio.

While in Prague, Goldberg completed her first novel, Kirkus, a story of an Eastern European circus troupe engulfed by the onset of World War II. She gave it to an agent who shopped it for 18 months, but it was not published by the time she had begun working on Bee Season, so it was shelved.

After returning to Brooklyn Goldberg took several jobs, including working on a production of a Stephen King horror movie. She was let go from that job, which brought an unforeseen benefit - the six months of unemployment benefits checks gave her sufficient time to finish Bee Season ("It was a grant, as far as I was concerned", she told an Oberlin student interviewer in 2005).

Goldberg's first published novel was Bee Season (2000), portraying the breakdown of a family and the spiritual explorations of its two children amid a series of spelling bees. It was a popular and critical success, and was adapted into a film in 2005. She has also published short stories in Virgin Fiction, Eclectic Literary Forum, New American Writing, McSweeney's and Harpers Magazine. She reviews books for The New York Times and Bookforum.

In 2005 Goldberg published a second novel, Wickett's Remedy (2005), which is set during the 1918 influenza epidemic. Her third novel, The False Friend, was published in 2010. It describes a woman whose memory is jogged, causing her to revisit a tragic event in her youth. "It's about memory, hometowns and the adults children turn into," Goldberg told an interviewer. Feast Your Eyes was published in 2019.

"Song for Myla Goldberg" is track six on The Decemberists' album Her Majesty The Decemberists. It makes a handful of allusions to Bee Season.

== Bibliography ==
- —— (2000). Bee Season. Anchor Books.
- —— (2005). Wickett's Remedy. Knopf.
- —— (2010). The False Friend. Anchor Books.
- —— (2019). Feast Your Eyes. Alfred A. Knopf.
