= Wickett's Remedy =

2005 novel by Myla Goldberg

Wickett's Remedy is a 2005 historical novel by Myla Goldberg, about the 1918 influenza epidemic. It was published by Doubleday.

The novel makes heavy use of annotations, marginalia, and false documents to support its premise; Goldberg has stated that Vladimir Nabokov's Pale Fire was a major influence on her in this respect.

== Plot ==
In 1918 Boston, Lydia Kilkenny is a sales clerk who marries medical student Henry Wickett. When Henry, and most of her relatives, die of the "Spanish flu", Lydia becomes a nurse, and works to help find a cure by assisting in medical experiments on convicted Navy deserters. She also continues to sell Henry's patent medicine (the Remedy of the title) until Henry's business partner repackages it as a soft drink.

== Reception ==
In The New York Times, Andrea Barrett described it as "ambitious", "thoroughly researched", and "admirable", with "a set of nightmarish, wonderfully well-written chapters that would have made a strong short novel all on their own", but felt that it was a "somewhat uneasy mixture" of emotional fiction and historical fact; as well, Barrett considered that the novel's sheer scope and "kaleidoscopic narrative" worked to its detriment. The Pittsburgh Post-Gazette felt it was "too ambitious", but a "heartening example of ... risk-taking" on Goldberg's part, emphasizing that the novel was nonetheless "very readable", and that Goldberg had included "powerful imagery, succinct prose and unabashed sensitivity".

The Seattle Times considered the book "well-researched" but "somewhat elusive and not entirely satisfying", comparing it unfavorably to Goldberg's earlier work Bee Season. Salon described it as "historically credible," and stated that "the real reason to read" the novel is "the chance to spend a few hours" with Lydia.
