= Sigrid Nunez =

American writer (born 1951)

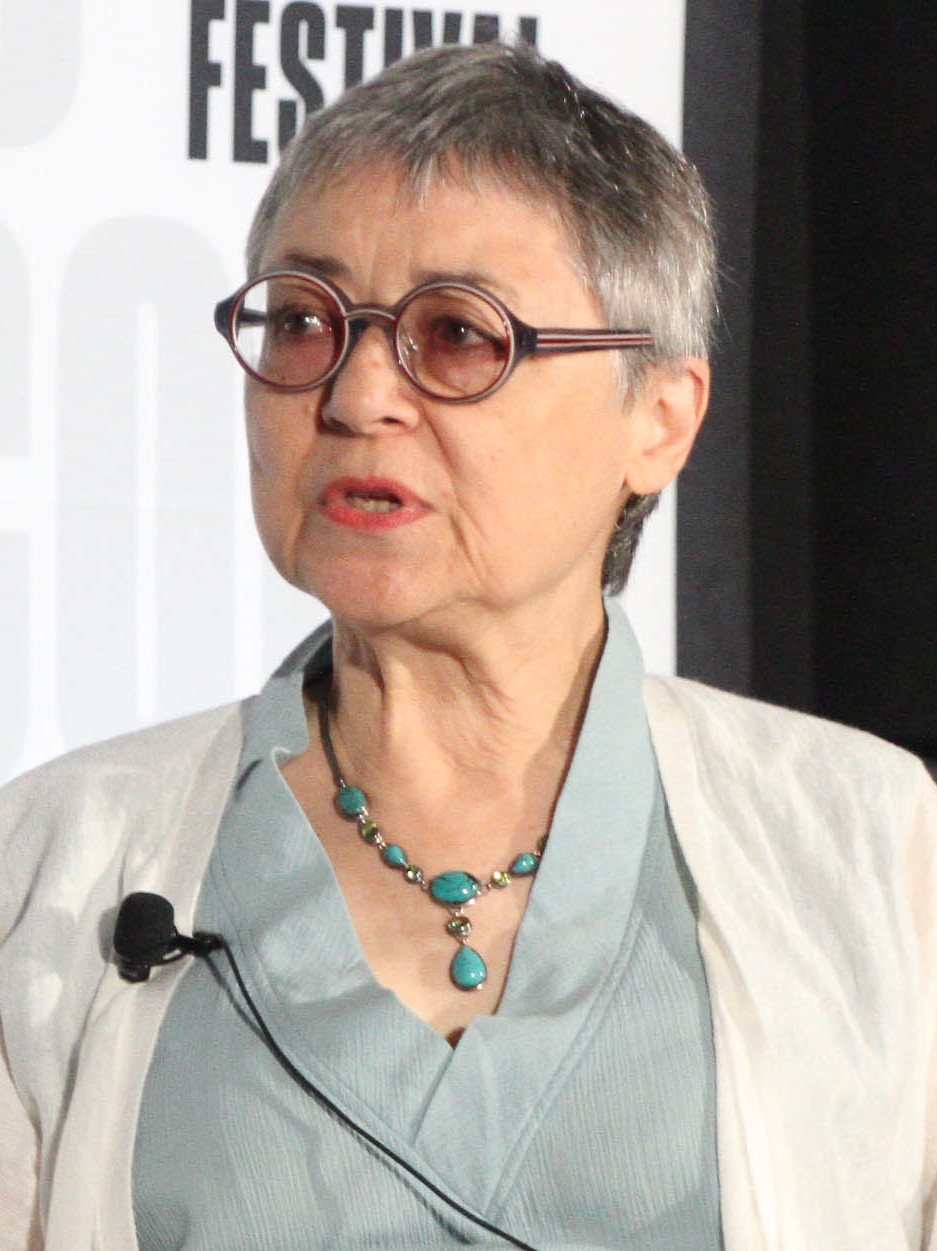
- Nunez at the 2019 National Book Festival
- Born: 12 March 1951 (age 75); New York City, U.S.
- Education: Barnard College (BA); Columbia University (MFA)
- Occupation: Author
- Writing career
- Notable awards: Whiting Award; Rome Prize; Berlin Prize; National Book Award; Guggenheim Fellowship; Windham-Campbell Literature Prize

Sigrid Nunez (born 1951) is an American author and writer who is best known for her novels. Her seventh novel, The Friend, won the 2018 National Book Award for Fiction. In 2025, Nunez was named as the recipient of a Windham-Campbell Literature Prize in the fiction category.

== Biography ==
Sigrid Nunez was born and raised in New York City, the daughter of a German mother and a Chinese-Panamanian father. She received her BA from Barnard College (1972) and her MFA from Columbia University (1975), after which she worked for a time as an editorial assistant at The New York Review of Books. Nunez has published nine novels, including A Feather on the Breath of God, The Last of Her Kind, The Friend, What Are You Going Through, and, most recently, The Vulnerables. She is also the author of Sempre Susan: A Memoir of Susan Sontag and It Will Come Back to You: Collected Stories.

Among the journals to which Nunez has contributed are The New Yorker, The New York Times, The New York Review of Books, The Paris Review, The Yale Review, McSweeney's, The Believer, The Threepenny Review, the London Review of Books, Harper's Magazine, and The Wall Street Journal.

Her work has also appeared in several anthologies, including four Pushcart Prize volumes and four anthologies of Asian-American literature. Two of her short stories have been selected for The Best American Short Stories. Nunez, a Fellow of the John Simon Guggenheim Memorial Foundation, is also the recipient of a Whiting Writer's Award, a Berlin Prize Fellowship, the Rosenthal Foundation Award and the Rome Prize in Literature. Nunez is a member of the American Academy of Arts and Letters.

Nunez has taught at Barnard, Columbia, Princeton, Boston University, and the New School, and has been a visiting writer or writer in residence at Amherst, Smith, Baruch, Vassar, Syracuse, and the University of California, Irvine, among others. Nunez has also been on the faculty of the Bread Loaf Writers' Conference and of several other writers' conferences across the country. Her work has been translated into thirty-five languages.

Nunez lives in New York City.

In 2024, two of her novels were adapted into films. The duo Scott McGehee and David Siegel adapted her novel The Friend into a film starring Naomi Watts. Spanish filmmaker Pedro Almodóvar adapted What Are You Going Through into his English feature debut, The Room Next Door, starring Tilda Swinton and Julianne Moore. The latter was awarded the prestigious Golden Lion at the 81st Venice International Film Festival.

== Book synopses ==
- In A Feather on the Breath of God (1995), "a young woman looks back to the world of her immigrant parents: a Chinese-Panamanian father and a German mother, who meet in postwar Germany and settle in New York City. Growing up in a housing project in the 1950s and 1960s, the narrator escapes into dreams inspired both by her parents' stories and by her own reading and, for a time, into the otherworldly life of ballet." The New York Times described Nunez's debut as "A forceful novel by a writer of uncommon talent."
- Naked Sleeper (1996) is "a novel about the inescapable and sometimes unendurable complexities of love and the family drama," in which a woman falls into an extramarital affair and attempts to understand the father who abandoned her as a child.
- Mitz: The Marmoset of Bloomsbury (1998) is a mock biography of a pet marmoset belonging to Leonard and Virginia Woolf. NPR described Mitz as "[a] wry, supremely intelligent literary gem about devotion."
- For Rouenna (2001). "Now in her fourth and perhaps best novel to date—about a writer haunted by her brief friendship with a former Vietnam combat nurse—Nunez revisits familiar Proustian territory with a frightening rigor."
- The Last of Her Kind (2006) follows the arc of a friendship between two women from different socioeconomic backgrounds who meet as roommates at Barnard College in 1968. Nunez has said that she wanted to write about the sixties by imagining the lives of "specific individuals who happened to come of age in that revolutionary time." Andrew O'Hehir called it "perhaps the finest [social novel] yet written about that peculiar generation of young Americans who believed their destiny was to shape history."
- In Salvation City (2010), a thirteen-year-old boy is orphaned in a global flu pandemic and sent to live with an evangelical pastor and his wife. "Salvation City is a story of love, betrayal, and forgiveness. It is about spiritual and moral growth, and the consolation of art." Gary Shteyngart has said that the novel "makes one reconsider the ordering of our world."
- Sempre Susan: A Memoir of Susan Sontag (2011). In 1976, while recovering from surgery, Sontag hired Nunez to type her correspondence. Nunez began dating Sontag's son, David Rieff, and moved into the Upper West Side apartment that mother and son were sharing at the time. "This detailed, nuanced account of the more private side of a complex, contradictory public figure is told with even-handed good humor and more than a little compassion. Utterly absorbing." — Lydia Davis
- The Friend (2018). After her mentor and lifelong friend dies by suicide, a writer inherits his Great Dane. The Friend is both a "contemplation of writing and the loss of integrity in our literary life" and, in the words of Cathleen Schine, "the most original canine love story since My Dog Tulip." It won the 2018 National Book Award and was a finalist for the 2019 Simpson/Joyce Carol Oates Literary Prize. The Friend was a New York Times bestseller. It was short listed for the 2020 International Dublin Literary Award. In France, it was longlisted in the category of foreign fiction for the 2019 Prix Femina and selected as a finalist for the 2019 Prix du Meilleure Livre Étranger.
- What Are You Going Through (2020). A woman agrees to help a terminally ill friend by going away with her and seeing her through the last days of her life. The friend is planning to take a euthanasia drug rather than let cancer take its course. "It's as good as The Friend, if not better." — Dwight Garner
- The Vulnerables (2023). A writer, old enough to be considered a "vulnerable" in the early days of the COVID-19 pandemic in New York City, pet-sits a spirited parrot named Eureka in her friends' luxury apartment. When the original petsitter, a Gen Z college student, returns to the apartment, he and the narrator strike up an unlikely friendship. "Her Wordsworthian exploration of 'how much of life is shaped by sadness for what's left behind,' her rare ability to be at once wistfully elegiac and sharply hilarious make The Vulnerables a gift." In France, it won the Prix des Inrockuptibles and was a finalist for the Prix Femina étranger. It was also longlisted for the Prix Médicis étranger, the Grand Prix de littérature américaine, and the Prix du Meilleur livre étranger.
- It Will Come Back to You: Collected Stories (2026) Thirteen short stories spanning Nunez's career.

== Bibliography ==
=== Books ===
- A Feather on the Breath of God. New York: HarperCollins. 1995. ISBN 9780312422738.
- Naked Sleeper. New York: HarperCollins. 1996. ISBN 9780060172763.
- Mitz: The Marmoset of Bloomsbury. New York: HarperFlamingo. 1998. ISBN 9780060174071.
- For Rouenna. New York: Farrar, Straus and Giroux. 2001. ISBN 9780374254308.
- The Last of Her Kind. New York: Farrar, Straus and Giroux. 2006. ISBN 9780374183813.
- Salvation City. New York: Riverhead Books. 2010. ISBN 9781594487668.
- Sempre Susan: A Memoir of Susan Sontag. New York: Atlas Books. 2011. ISBN 9781594633348.
- The Friend. New York: Riverhead Books. 2018. ISBN 9780735219441.
- What Are You Going Through. New York: Riverhead Books. 2020. ISBN 9780593191415.
- The Vulnerables. New York: Riverhead Books. 2023. ISBN 9780593715512.
- It Will Come Back to You: Collected Stories. New York: Riverhead Books. 2026. ISBN 979-8217179152

=== Selected stories ===
- "Chang", The Threepenny Review 38 (Summer 1989) - excerpt from A Feather on the Breath of God
- "Christa", The Iowa Review 21.1 (Winter 1991) - excerpt from A Feather on the Breath of God
- "The Balloon", Salmagundi 93 (Winter 1992)
- "A Visit to the Great Man", The Threepenny Review 100 (Winter 2005)
- "The Naked Juror", Daedalus 134.1 (Winter 2005)
- "Airport Story", The Threepenny Review 127 (Fall 2011)
- "Imagination", The Sun (April 2012)
- "Philosophers",Conjunctions 58 (Spring 2012)
- "Worried Sisters", Prairie Schooner 86.1 (Spring 2012) and Harper's (September 2012)
- "The Blind", Paris Review 222 (Fall 2017) - excerpt from The Friend
- "It Will Come Back to You", London Review of Books (November 2021)
- "Greensleeves", The New Yorker (September 2024)
- "The Rabbit's Foot", The Yale Review (Summer 2025)

=== Selected essays ===
- "Suddenly Susan" (adaptation from Sempre Susan). The New York Times, February 25, 2011.
- "Love and Fiction" (excerpt from Little Star #4). littlestarjournal.com, December 12, 2012.
- "Shakespeare for Survivors" (review of Station Eleven, a novel, by Emily St. John Mandel). The New York Times Book Review, September 12, 2014.
- "Two Memoirs Celebrate Muses With Four Legs" (review of two memoirs: Afterglow by Eileen Myles and Fetch by Nicole J. Georges). The New York Times Book Review, September 28, 2017.
- "'Sight' and The Pleasures of Overthinking Motherhood" (review of Sight, a novel, by Jesse Greengrass). newyorker.com, August 22, 2018.
- "Leonard Michaels Was a Cat Person" (introduction to A Cat, a novel, by Leonard Michaels). Paris Review Daily, November 14, 2018.
- "Sex and Sincerity" (review of Cleanness, a novel, by Garth Greenwell). The New York Review of Books, June 11, 2020.
- "Disorders of the Heart" (review of To Be a Man, a short story collection, by Nicole Krauss). The New York Review of Books, November 5, 2020.
- "Lost, at Sea, at Odds" (review of Whereabouts, a novel, by Jhumpa Lahiri, translated from the Italian by the author). The New York Review. May 27, 2021.
- "'Desperate Characters' and the Chaos That Lies Beneath", The New York Times Style Magazine, July 13, 2022.
- "Gored in the Afternoon" (review of Getting Lost, a novel, by Annie Ernaux, translated from the French by Alison L. Strayer). The New York Review. November 3, 2022.

=== Film adaptations ===
- The Room Next Door (2024), based on the novel What Are You Going Through.
- The Friend (2024), based on the homonymous novel.
