= List of cult films: L =

The following is a list of cult films organized alphabetically by name. See List of cult films for main list.

Film	Year	Director	Source
Labyrinth	1986	Jim Henson	
Labyrinth of Passion	1982	Pedro Almodóvar	
Ladies and Gentlemen, The Fabulous Stains	1982	Lou Adler	
Lady Chatterley	2006	Pascale Ferran	
The Lady Eve	1941	Preston Sturges	
Lady Frankenstein	1971	Mel Welles	
The Lady from Shanghai	1947	Orson Welles	
The Lady Gambles	1949	Michael Gordon	
Lady in the Lake	1946	Robert Montgomery	
Lady Snowblood	1973	Toshiya Fujita	
Lady Terminator	1988	Tjut Djalil	
The Ladykillers	1955	Alexander Mackendrick	
Lagaan	2001	Ashutosh Gowariker	
Lapis	1966	James Whitney	
Land of the Dead	2005	George A. Romero	
Land of the Minotaur (also known as The Devil's Men and Minotaur, The Mask of the Demons)	1976	Kostas Karagiannis	
Land of the Pharaohs	1955	Howard Hawks	
Lantana	2001	Ray Lawrence	
Lassie Come Home	1943	Fred M. Wilcox	
Last Action Hero	1993	John McTiernan	
The Last Dragon	1985	Michael Schultz	
Last House on Massacre Street (also known as The Bride and The House That Cried Murder)	1973	Jean-Marie Pélissié	
The Last House on the Left	1972	Wes Craven	
The Last Man on Earth	1964	Sidney Salkow and Ubaldo B. Ragona	
The Last Mitterrand	2005	Robert Guédiguian	
The Last Movie	1971	Dennis Hopper	
The Last Picture Show	1971	Peter Bogdanovich	
The Last Seduction	1994	John Dahl	
Last Summer	1969	Frank Perry	
Last Tango in Paris	1972	Bernardo Bertolucci	
The Last Unicorn	1982	Arthur Rankin Jr. and Jules Bass	
The Last Waltz	1978	Martin Scorsese	
The Last War	1961	Shūe Matsubayashi	
The Last Wave	1977	Peter Weir	
Last Woman on Earth	1960	Roger Corman	
Last Year at Marienbad	1961	Alain Resnais	
Late Marriage	2001	Dover Kosashvili	
Latitude Zero	1969	Ishirō Honda	
Laura	1944	Otto Preminger	
Laurin	1989	Robert Sigl	
Lawrence of Arabia	1962	David Lean	
The Leather Boys	1964	Sidney J. Furie	
Leave Her to Heaven	1945	John M. Stahl	
Leave No Trace	2018	Debra Granik	
Leaving Las Vegas	1995	Mike Figgis	
The Song Remains the Same	1976	Peter Clifton and Joe Massot	
Legend	1985	Ridley Scott	
Legend of a Fighter	1982	Yuen Woo-ping	
The Legend of Doom House (also known as Malpertuis)	1971	Harry Kümel	
The Legend of the 7 Golden Vampires	1974	Roy Ward Baker and Chang Cheh	
Legend of the Overfiend (also known as Urotsukidōji)	1989	Hideki Takayama	
The Legend of the Wolf Woman (also known as Werewolf Woman)	1976	Rino Di Silvestro	
Legionnaire	1998	Peter MacDonald	
Lemonade	2016	Beyonce, et al.	
Lemonade Joe	1964	Oldřich Lipský	
Leningrad Cowboys Go America	1989	Aki Kaurismäki	
Lenny	1974	Bob Fosse	
Léon: The Professional	1994	Luc Besson	
The Leopard	1963	Luchino Visconti	
Let Me Die a Woman	1978	Doris Wishman	
Let the Right One In	2008	Tomas Alfredson	
Let's Get Lost	1988	Bruce Weber	
Let's Scare Jessica to Death	1971	John D. Hancock	
Liane, Jungle Goddess	1956	Eduard von Borsody	
The Lickerish Quartet	1970	Radley Metzger	
The Life and Death of Colonel Blimp	1943	Michael Powell and Emeric Pressburger	
The Life and Times of Rosie the Riveter	1980	Connie Field	
Life of Brian (also known as Monty Python's Life of Brian)	1979	Terry Jones	
The Life of Jesus (also known as La Vie de Jésus)	1997	Bruno Dumont	
Life During Wartime	2009	Todd Solondz	
Lifeforce	1985	Tobe Hooper	
Light Sleeper	1992	Paul Schrader	
Lightning Over Water	1980	Wim Wenders and Nicholas Ray	
Lili	1953	Charles Walters	
Lilith	1964	Robert Rossen	
Lilya 4-ever	2002	Lukas Moodysson	
The Limey	1999	Steven Soderbergh	
The Lion in Winter	1968	Anthony Harvey	
Liquid Sky	1982	Slava Tsukerman	
Lisa and the Devil	1974	Mario Bava	
Lisztomania	1975	Ken Russell	
Little Big Man	1970	Arthur Penn	
Little Darlings	1980	Ronald F. Maxwell	
The Little Princess	1939	Walter Lang	
The Little Shop of Horrors	1960	Roger Corman	
Little Shop of Horrors	1986	Frank Oz	
Little Women	1994	Gillian Armstrong	
Live and Let Die	1973	Guy Hamilton	
The Lives of Others	2006	Florian Henckel von Donnersmarck	
The Living Dead Girl (also known as La Morte Vivante)	1982	Jean Rollin	
The Living End	1992	Gregg Araki	
Living in Bondage	1992	Chris Obi Rapu	
Living in Oblivion	1995	Tom DiCillo	
A Lizard in a Woman's Skin	1971	Lucio Fulci	
Local Hero	1983	Bill Forsyth	
Lock, Stock and Two Smoking Barrels	1998	Guy Ritchie	
The Locket	1946	John Brahm	
Logan's Run	1976	Michael Anderson	
Lola Montès	1955	Max Ophüls	
Lolita	1962	Stanley Kubrick	
London After Midnight	1927	Tod Browning	
London to Brighton	2006	Paul Andrew Williams	
Lone Star	1996	John Sayles	
Lone Wolf and Cub: Baby Cart at the River Styx	1972	Kenji Misumi	
The Loneliness of the Long Distance Runner	1962	Tony Richardson	
Lonely Are the Brave	1962	David Miller	
The Long Good Friday	1980	John Mackenzie	
The Long Goodbye	1973	Robert Altman	
The Long Hair of Death	1964	Antonio Margheriti	
The Long Kiss Goodnight	1996	Renny Harlin	
The Long Riders	1980	Walter Hill	
The Long Walk Home	1990	Richard Pearce	
The Longest Yard	1974	Robert Aldrich	
Lords of Dogtown	2005	Catherine Hardwicke	
The Lord of the G-Strings: The Femaleship of the String	2003	Terry M. West	
The Lord of the Rings	1978	Ralph Bakshi	
The Lord of the Rings	2001-3	Peter Jackson	
The Lost Boys	1987	Joel Schumacher	
Lost Continent	1951	Sam Newfield	
Lost Highway	1997	David Lynch	
Lost Horizon	1937	Frank Capra	
Lost in La Mancha	2002	Keith Fulton and Louis Pepe	
Lost in Translation	2003	Sofia Coppola	
The Lost Skeleton of Cadavra	2001	Larry Blamire	
The Lost Weekend	1945	Billy Wilder	
Love and Death	1974	Woody Allen	
Love Finds Andy Hardy	1938	George B. Seitz	
Love Is the Devil: Study for a Portrait of Francis Bacon	1998	John Maybury	
Love Mates (also known as Do You Believe in Angels?)	1961	Lars-Magnus Lindgren	
Love Me Tender	1956	Robert D. Webb	
Love Streams	1984	John Cassavetes	
The Loved One	1965	Tony Richardson	
The Loveless	1981	Kathryn Bigelow and Monty Montgomery	
Lucifer Rising	1972	Kenneth Anger	
Lucky Number Slevin	2006	Paul McGuigan	
Ludwig: Requiem for a Virgin King	1972	Hans-Jürgen Syberberg	
Lupin III: The Castle of Cagliostro	1979	Hayao Miyazaki	
Lunacy	2005	Jan Švankmajer	
The Lure	2015	Agnieszka Smoczyńska	
Lust, Caution	2007	Ang Lee	
