= List of cult films: E =

This is a list of cult films organized alphabetically by name. See List of cult films for main list.

Film	Year	Director	Source
Earth Girls Are Easy	1988	Julien Temple	
Earth vs. the Flying Saucers	1956	Fred F. Sears	
Earthquake	1974	Mark Robson	
East Is East	1999	Damien O'Donnell	
East of Borneo	1931	George Melford	
East Side Story	1997	Dana Ranga	
Eastern Promises	2007	David Cronenberg	
Easy Rider	1969	Dennis Hopper	
Eat Drink Man Woman	1994	Ang Lee	
Eating Out	2004	Q. Allan Brocka	
Eating Raoul	1982	Paul Bartel	
Ecstasy	1933	Gustav Machatý	
Ecstasy of the Angels	1972	Kōji Wakamatsu	
Ed Wood	1994	Tim Burton	
Edvard Munch	1974	Peter Watkins	
Edward Scissorhands	1990	Tim Burton	
The Eerie Midnight Horror Show (also known as Enter the Devil and The Sexorcist)	1974	Mario Gariazzo	
Election	1999	Alexander Payne	
Electra Glide in Blue	1973	James William Guercio	
Elephant	2003	Gus Van Sant	
The Elephant Man	1980	David Lynch	
Emanuelle and the Last Cannibals (also known as Trap Them and Kill Them)	1977	Joe D'Amato	
Embryo	1976	Ralph Nelson	
Emma Mae (also known as Black Sister's Revenge)	1976	Jamaa Fanaka	
Emmanuelle	1974	Just Jaeckin	
Emperor Tomato Ketchup	1970	Shūji Terayama	
Empire	1964	Andy Warhol	
Empire of the Ants	1977	Bert I. Gordon	
Empire Records	1995	Allan Moyle	
The Empire Strikes Back	1980	Irvin Kershner	
The End	1978	Burt Reynolds	
The End of Agent W4C	1967	Václav Vorlíček	
Endangered Species	1982	Alan Rudolph	
Enter the Devil (also known as The Eerie Midnight Horror Show and The Sexorcist)	1974	Mario Gariazzo	
Enter the Dragon	1973	Robert Clouse	
Equinox	1970	Robert Day	
Eraserhead	1977	David Lynch	
The Erotomaniac Daimyo	1972	Norifumi Suzuki	
Escape 2000 (also known as Blood Camp Thatcher and Turkey Shoot)	1982	Brian Trenchard-Smith	
Escape from New York	1981	John Carpenter	
Escape to Victory	1981	John Huston	
Escaped Murderer from Hiroshima Prison (also known as The Rapacious Jailbreaker)	1974	Sadao Nakajima	
The Escort	1993	Ricky Tognazzi	
Eternal Sunshine of the Spotless Mind	2004	Michel Gondry	
Europa (also known as Zentropa)	1991	Lars von Trier	
Even Dwarfs Started Small	1970	Werner Herzog	
Everything You Always Wanted to Know About Sex* (*But Were Afraid to Ask)	1972	Woody Allen	
The Evil Dead	1981	Sam Raimi	
Evil Dead II	1987	Sam Raimi	
Excalibur	1981	John Boorman	
The Execution of Private Slovik	1974	Lamont Johnson	
The Executioner II: Karate Inferno	1974	Teruo Ishii	
Executive Action	1973	David Miller	
Existenz	1999	David Cronenberg	
The Exorcist	1973	William Friedkin	
Exotica	1994	Atom Egoyan	
Das Experiment (also known as The Experiment)	2001	Oliver Hirschbiegel	
Exposed (also known as Exponerad)	1971	Gustaf Wiklund	
Expresso Bongo	1959	Val Guest	
Eyes Wide Shut	1999	Stanley Kubrick	
Eyes Without a Face	1960	Georges Franju	
