= List of cult films: D =

This is a list of cult films organized alphabetically by name. See List of cult films for main list.

Film	Year	Director	Source
D.O.A.	1950	Rudolph Maté	
Daddy Longlegs	2009	Safdie brothers	
Daimajin	1966	Kimiyoshi Yasuda	
Daisies	1966	Věra Chytilová	
Damn Yankees	1958	George Abbott and Stanley Donen	
Damnation Alley	1977	Jack Smight	
The Damned	1969	Luchino Visconti	
Dance, Girl, Dance	1940	Dorothy Arzner	
Dancer in the Dark	2000	Lars von Trier	
Danger: Diabolik	1968	Mario Bava	
Dangerous When Wet	1953	Charles Walters	
Dante's Inferno	1911	Francesco Bertolini, Adolfo Padovan, Giuseppe De Liguoro	
Danton	1983	Andrzej Wajda	
Dark City	1998	Alex Proyas	
Dark Habits (also known as Entre tinieblas)	1983	Pedro Almodóvar	
The Dark Knight	2008	Christopher Nolan	
Dark Soldier D	1998	Multiple	
Dark Star	1974	John Carpenter	
Dark Water	2002	Hideo Nakata	
Dark Waters	1994	Mariano Baino	
Darkman	1990	Sam Raimi	
Daughters of Darkness	1971	Harry Kümel	
Dawn of the Dead	1978	George A. Romero	
Dawn of the Dead	2004	Zack Snyder	
The Dawn Patrol	1938	Edmund Goulding	
Day of the Animals	1977	William Girdler	
The Day of the Beast	1995	Álex de la Iglesia	
Day of the Dead	1985	George A. Romero	
Day of the Fight	1951	Stanley Kubrick	
The Day of the Jackal	1973	Fred Zinnemann	
The Day of the Locust	1975	John Schlesinger	
Day of the Woman (also known as I Spit on Your Grave)	1978	Meir Zarchi	
The Day the Earth Caught Fire	1961	Val Guest	
The Day the Earth Stood Still	1951	Robert Wise	
Day the World Ended	1955	Roger Corman	
Days of Heaven	1978	Terrence Malick	
Days of Wine and Roses	1962	Blake Edwards	
Dazed and Confused	1993	Richard Linklater	
Dead & Buried	1981	Gary Sherman	
Dead Alive (also known as Braindead)	1992	Peter Jackson	
Dead Man	1995	Jim Jarmusch	
Dead Man's Shoes	2004	Shane Meadows	
Dead Men Don't Wear Plaid	1982	Carl Reiner	
Dead of Night	1945	Alberto Cavalcanti, Charles Crichton, Basil Dearden, Robert Hamer	
Dead or Alive	1999	Takashi Miike	
The Dead That Walk (also known as Zombies of Mora Tau)	1957	Edward L. Cahn	
Deadly Weapons	1974	Doris Wishman	
Death Becomes Her	1992	Robert Zemeckis	
Death Line (also known as Raw Meat)	1972	Gary Sherman	
The Death of Dick Long	2019	Daniel Scheinert	
Death Proof	2007	Quentin Tarantino	
Death Race 2000	1975	Paul Bartel	
Death Rides a Horse	1967	Giulio Petroni	
Death Ward #13 (also known as Don't Look in the Basement and The Forgotten)	1973	S. F. Brownrigg	
Death Wish	1974	Michael Winner	
Deathquake (also known as Magnitude 7.9)	1980	Kenjirô Ohmori	
Debbie Does Dallas	1978	Jim Clark	
The Decline of Western Civilization	1981	Penelope Spheeris	
The Decline of Western Civilization Part II: The Metal Years	1988	Penelope Spheeris	
The Decline of Western Civilization Part III	1998	Penelope Spheeris	
Deep Crimson	1996	Arturo Ripstein	
Deep End	1970	Jerzy Skolimowski	
The Deep End	2001	Scott McGehee and David Siegel	
Deep Red	1975	Dario Argento	
Deep Throat	1972	Gerard Damiano	
Deep Water	2006	Louise Osmond and Jerry Rothwell	
The Deer Hunter	1978	Michael Cimino	
Delicatessen	1991	Jean-Pierre Jeunet and Marc Caro	
Deliverance	1972	John Boorman	
The Delta	1996	Ira Sachs	
Dementia 13 (also known as The Haunted and the Hunted)	1963	Francis Ford Coppola	
Demon Seed	1977	Donald Cammell	
The Demon Within (also known as The Happiness Cage and The Mind Snatchers)	1972	Bernard Girard	
Demonia	1990	Lucio Fulci	
Dersu Uzala	1975	Akira Kurosawa	
Desert Hearts	1985	Donna Deitch	
Deshdrohi	2008	Jagdish A. Sharma	
Desperate Living	1977	John Waters	
Destination Moon	1950	Irving Pichel	
Destiny (also known as Between Two Worlds)	1921	Fritz Lang	
Destroy All Monsters	1968	Ishirō Honda	
Detour	1945	Edgar G. Ulmer	
The Devil and Daniel Webster (also known as All That Money Can Buy)	1941	William Dieterle	
The Devil and Miss Jones	1941	Sam Wood	
Devil in a Blue Dress	1995	Carl Franklin	
The Devil in Miss Jones	1973	Gerard Damiano	
The Devil Rides Out	1968	Terence Fisher	
The Devil Wears Prada	2006	David Frankel	
The Devil-Doll	1936	Tod Browning	
The Devil's Advocate	1997	Taylor Hackford	
The Devil's Backbone	2001	Guillermo del Toro	
The Devil's Men (also known as Land of the Minotaur and Minotaur, The Mask of the Demons)	1976	Kostas Karagiannis	
The Devil's Nightmare	1971	Jean Brismée	
The Devil's Playground	1976	Fred Schepisi	
The Devil's Wedding Night	1973	Luigi Batzella and Joe D'Amato	
The Devils	1971	Ken Russell	
Le diable est parmi nous (also known as The Possession of Virginia and Satan's Sabbath)	1972	Jean Beaudin	
Les Diaboliques (also known as Diaboloque)	1955	Henri-Georges Clouzot	
Dial M for Murder	1954	Alfred Hitchcock	
Diaries, Notes, and Sketches (also known as Walden)	1968	Jonas Mekas	
Diary of a Country Priest	1951	Robert Bresson	
Diary of the Dead	2007	George A. Romero	
Die Hard	1988	John McTiernan	
Different from the Others	1919	Richard Oswald	
Dillinger	1973	John Milius	
Dillinger Is Dead	1969	Marco Ferreri	
The Dinner Game (also known as Le Dîner de Cons)	1998	Francis Veber	
Dirty Dancing	1987	Emile Ardolino	
Dirty Harry	1971	Don Siegel	
Dirty Pretty Things	2002	Stephen Frears	
The Discreet Charm of the Bourgeoisie	1972	Luis Buñuel	
The Dish	2000	Rob Sitch	
Distant Voices, Still Lives	1988	Terence Davies	
District 9	2009	Neill Blomkamp	
District 13	2004	Pierre Morel	
Diva	1981	Jean-Jacques Beineix	
Divide and Conquer	1943	Frank Capra	
Il divo	2008	Paolo Sorrentino	
Django	1966	Sergio Corbucci	
Django the Bastard	1969	Sergio Garrone	
Do Gaz Zameen Ke Neeche	1972	Tulsi Ramsay and Shyam Ramsay	
Do the Right Thing	1989	Spike Lee	
Do You Believe in Angels? (also known as Love Mates)	1961	Lars-Magnus Lindgren	
Doctor X	1932	Michael Curtiz	
Dog Day Afternoon	1975	Sidney Lumet	
Dog Soldiers	2002	Neil Marshall	
Dog Star Man	1965	Stan Brakhage	
A Dog's Breakfast	2007	David Hewlett	
Dogtown and Z-Boys	2001	Stacy Peralta	
La dolce vita	1960	Federico Fellini	
Don't Look in the Basement (also known as Death Ward #13 and The Forgotten)	1973	S. F. Brownrigg	
Don't Look Now	1973	Nicolas Roeg	
Don't Torture a Duckling	1972	Lucio Fulci	
Don't Worry About Me	2009	David Morrissey	
Donkey Skin	1970	Jacques Demy	
Donnie Brasco	1997	Mike Newell	
Donnie Darko	2001	Richard Kelly	
Donovan's Brain	1953	Felix E. Feist	
Dont Look Back	1965	D.A. Pennebaker	
The Doom Generation	1995	Gregg Araki	
Double Indemnity	1944	Billy Wilder	
Le Doulos	1962	Jean-Pierre Melville	
Down By Law	1986	Jim Jarmusch	
Downfall	2004	Oliver Hirschbiegel	
Dr. Cyclops	1940	Ernest B. Schoedsack	
Dr. Dippy's Sanitarium	1906		
Dr. Goldfoot and the Bikini Machine	1965	Norman Taurog	
Dr. Strangelove or: How I Learned to Stop Worrying and Love the Bomb	1964	Stanley Kubrick	
Dr. Terror's House of Horrors	1965	Freddie Francis	
Dracula	1931	Tod Browning	
Dracula vs. Frankenstein	1971	Al Adamson	
Dracula: Pages from a Virgin's Diary	2002	Guy Maddin	
Dracula's Dog (also known as Zoltan... Hound of Dracula)	1977	Albert Band	
The Dragon Flies (also known as The Man from Hong Kong)	1975	Brian Trenchard-Smith	
Dragon Princess	1975	Yutaka Kohira	
The Draughtsman's Contract	1982	Peter Greenaway	
Dream of Light	1992	Víctor Erice	
Dreamgirls	2006	Bill Condon	
Dreamscape	1984	Joseph Ruben	
Dressed to Kill	1980	Brian De Palma	
The Dresser	1983	Peter Yates	
The Driller Killer	1979	Abel Ferrara	
Drifter	2007	Cao Guimarães	
Drive	2011	Nicolas Winding Refn	
The Driver	1978	Walter Hill	
Drowning by Numbers	1988	Peter Greenaway	
Drugstore Cowboy	1989	Gus Van Sant	
Drunken Angel	1948	Akira Kurosawa	
Drunken Master	1978	Yuen Woo-ping	
Duck Amuck	1953	Charles M. Jones	
Duck Dodgers in the 24½th Century	1953	Charles M. Jones	
Duck Soup	1933	Leo McCarey	
Duel	1971	Steven Spielberg	
The Duellists	1977	Ridley Scott	
Dumplings	2004	Fruit Chan	
Dune	1984	David Lynch	
