= List of cult films: M =

This is a list of cult films organized alphabetically by name. See List of cult films for main list.

Film	Year	Director	Source
M	1931	Fritz Lang	
Mac and Me	1988	Stewart Raffill	
Macabre	1958	William Castle	
MacGruber	2010	Jorma Taccone	
The Machine Gun Dragon	1976	Akihisa Okamoto	
Machine-Gun Kelly	1958	Roger Corman	
The Mack	1973	Michael Campus	
Macunaíma	1969	Joaquim Pedro de Andrade	
Mad Dog Morgan	1976	Philippe Mora	
Mad Hot Ballroom	2005	Marilyn Agrelo	
Mad Love	1935	Karl Freund	
Mad Max	1979	George Miller	
Mad Max 2: The Road Warrior	1981	George Miller	
The Mad Monster	1942	Sam Newfield	
Mädchen in Uniform (Girls in Uniform)	1931	Leontine Sagan	
Magic Boy	1959	Akira Daikubara and Taiji Yabushita	
Magical Mystery Tour	1967	The Beatles and Bernard Knowles	
The Magnificent Ambersons	1942	Orson Welles	
Magnitude 7.9 (also known as Deathquake)	1980	Kenjirô Ohmori	
Maîtresse	1975	Barbet Schroeder	
Mala Noche	1986	Gus Van Sant	
The Mind Snatchers (also known as The Demon Within and The Happiness Cage)	1972	Bernard Girard	
Malcolm X	1992	Spike Lee	
Malpertuis (also known as The Legend of Doom House)	1971	Harry Kümel	
The Maltese Falcon	1941	John Huston	
Mama, There's a Man in Your Bed	1989	Coline Serreau	
Mamma Mia!	2008	Phyllida Lloyd	
Man Bites Dog	1992	Rémy Belvaux, André Bonzel, Benoît Poelvoorde	
A Man Escaped	1956	Robert Bresson	
Man Facing Southeast	1986	Eliseo Subiela	
The Man from Hong Kong (also known as The Dragon Flies)	1975	Brian Trenchard-Smith	
The Man from Planet X	1951	Edgar G. Ulmer	
Man Hunt	1941	Fritz Lang	
The Man in the Gray Flannel Suit	1956	Nunnally Johnson	
Man of the West	1958	Anthony Mann	
The Man on the Roof	1976	Bo Widerberg	
Man on Wire	2008	James Marsh	
The Man Who Fell to Earth	1976	Nicolas Roeg	
The Man Who Shot Liberty Valance	1962	John Ford	
The Man Who Wasn't There	2001	Joel Coen	
The Man Who Would Be King	1975	John Huston	
Man with a Movie Camera	1929	Dziga Vertov	
The Man with the Golden Arm	1955	Otto Preminger	
The Man with Two Brains	1983	Carl Reiner	
The Man Who Turned to Stone	1957	László Kardos	
The Manchurian Candidate	1962	John Frankenheimer	
Manhattan	1979	Woody Allen	
Manhunter	1986	Michael Mann	
Mania (also known as The Flesh and the Fiends)	1960	John Gilling	
Maniac	1934	Dwain Esper	
Maniac Cop	1988	William Lustig	
The Manitou	1978	William Girdler	
Manos: The Hands of Fate	1966	Harold P. Warren	
Mansion of the Doomed	1976	Michael Pataki	
The Manster	1959	George P. Breakston and Kenneth G. Crane	
Marathon Man	1976	John Schlesinger	
Marihuana	1936	Dwain Esper	
Mariken van Nieumeghen	1974	Joe Stelling	
Mark of the Vampire	1935	Tod Browning	
El Mariachi	1992	Robert Rodriguez	
Marnie	1964	Alfred Hitchcock	
The Marriage of Maria Braun	1976	Rainer Werner Fassbinder	
Married Life	2007	Ira Sachs	
Mars Attacks!	1996	Tim Burton	
Martin	1977	George A. Romero	
Marty	1955	Delbert Mann	
Martyrs	2008	Pascal Laugier	
Mary Jane's Not a Virgin Anymore	1996	Sarah Jacobson	
Mary, Mary, Bloody Mary	1975	Juan López Moctezuma	
La maschera del demonio (also known as Black Sunday)	1960	Mario Bava	
M*A*S*H	1970	Robert Altman	
The Mask	1961	Julian Roffman	
The Masque of the Red Death	1964	Roger Corman	
Massacre at Central High	1976	Rene Daalder	
Mata Hari	1931	George Fitzmaurice	
Matango	1963	Ishirō Honda	
Matilda	1996	Danny DeVito	
Matinee	1993	Joe Dante	
The Matrix	1999	The Wachowskis	
A Matter of Life and Death	1946	Michael Powell and Emeric Pressburger	
McCabe & Mrs. Miller	1971	Robert Altman	
Mean Girls	2004	Mark Waters	
Mean Streets	1973	Martin Scorsese	
Medea	1969	Pier Paolo Pasolini	
Medium Cool	1969	Haskell Wexler	
The Medusa Touch	1978	Jack Gold	
Meet Me in St. Louis	1944	Vincente Minnelli	
Meet the Feebles	1989	Peter Jackson	
Meet the Parents	2000	Jay Roach	
Memento	2000	Christopher Nolan	
The Men	1950	Fred Zinnemann	
Men in Black	1997	Barry Sonnenfeld	
Mera Naam Joker	1970	Raj Kapoor	
Merci la vie (also known as Thank You, Life)	1991	Bertrand Blier	
Mesa of Lost Women	1953	Herbert Tevos and Ron Ormond	
Meshes of the Afternoon	1943	Maya Deren and Alexandr Hackenschmied	
The Message	1976	Moustapha Akkad	
Message from Space	1978	Kinji Fukasaku	
Metallica: Some Kind of Monster	2004	Joe Berlinger and Bruce Sinofsky	
Metropolis	1927	Fritz Lang	
Miami Connection	1987	Richard Park and Y.K. Kim	
Midnight	1982	John A. Russo	
Midnight Cowboy	1969	John Schlesinger	
Midnight Express	1978	Alan Parker	
Midnight Run	1988	Martin Brest	
The Mighty	1998	Peter Chelsom	
The Mighty Peking Man	1977	Ho Meng-hua	
The Milagro Beanfield War	1988	Robert Redford	
Mildred Pierce	1945	Michael Curtiz	
Miller's Crossing	1990	The Coen Brothers	
The Million Eyes of Sumuru	1967	Harry Alan Towers	
The Millionairess	1960	Anthony Asquith	
Minbo	1992	Juzo Itami	
Minnie and Moskowitz	1971	John Cassavetes	
Minotaur, The Mask of the Demons (also known as The Devil's Men and Land of the Minotaur)	1976	Kostas Karagiannis	
Miracle on 34th Street	1947	George Seaton	
MirrorMask	2005	Dave McKean	
Misery	1990	Rob Reiner	
The Misfits	1961	John Huston	
Mishima: A Life in Four Chapters	1985	Paul Schrader	
The Mission	1986	Roland Joffé	
The Missouri Breaks	1976	Arthur Penn	
Modern Times	1936	Charlie Chaplin	
Modesty Blaise	1966	Joseph Losey	
Mommie Dearest	1981	Frank Perry	
Mondo Cane	1962	Gualtiero Jacopetti	
Mondo Hollywood	1967	Robert Carl Cohen	
Mondo Trasho	1969	John Waters	
Monkey Business	1931	Norman Z. McLeod	
Monsoon Wedding	2001	Mira Nair	
Monster from Green Hell	1957	Kenneth G. Crane	
The Monster That Challenged the World	1957	Arnold Laven	
Monsieur Verdoux	1947	Charlie Chaplin	
La Morte Vivante (also known as The Living Dead Girl)	1982	Jean Rollin	
The Monster Squad	1987	Fred Dekker	
Monte Walsh	1970	William A. Fraker	
Monterey Pop	1968	D.A. Pennebaker	
Monty Python and the Holy Grail	1975	Terry Gilliam and Terry Jones	
Monty Python's Life of Brian (also known as Life of Brian)	1979	Terry Jones	
Moon	2009	Duncan Jones	
The Moon and the Sledgehammer	1971	Philip Trevelyan	
The Moon in the Gutter	1983	Jean-Jacques Beineix	
Moonlighting	1982	Jerzy Skolimowski	
More	1969	Barbet Schroeder	
Morgan – A Suitable Case for Treatment	1966	Karel Reisz	
Mortal Inheritance	1996	Andy Amenechi	
The Most Dangerous Game (also known as The Hounds of Zaroff)	1932	Ernest B. Schoedsack and Irving Pichel	
The Most Terrible Time in My Life	1993	Kaizo Hayashi	
Motel Hell	1980	Kevin Connor	
The Mother	2003	Roger Michell	
Mother's Day	1980	Charles Kaufman	
Moulin Rouge	1952	John Huston	
Moulin Rouge!	2001	Baz Luhrmann	
The Movie Orgy	1968	Joe Dante	
Mr. India	1987	Shekhar Kapur	
Mr. Nice Guy	1997	Sammo Hung	
Mr. Nobody	2009	Jaco Van Dormael	
Mr. Reliable	1996	Nadia Tass	
Ms .45 (also known as Angel of Vengeance)	1981	Abel Ferrara	
Mudhoney	1965	Russ Meyer	
Mughal-e-Azam	1960	K. Asif	
Mulholland Drive	2001	David Lynch	
Multiple Maniacs	1970	John Waters	
Murder a la Mod	1968	Brian De Palma	
Murder She Said	1961	George Pollock	
Murder, My Sweet (also known as Farewell, My Lovely)	1944	Edward Dmytryk	
Muriel's Wedding	1994	P. J. Hogan	
The Music Box	1932	James Parrott	
The Music Lovers	1971	Ken Russell	
Mutual Appreciation	2005	Andrew Bujalski	
My Best Fiend	1999	Werner Herzog	
My Bloody Valentine	1981	George Mihalka	
My Cousin Vinny	1992	Jonathan Lynn	
My Darling Clementine	1946	John Ford	
My Favorite Year	1982	Richard Benjamin	
My Life as a Dog	1985	Lasse Hallström	
My Life Without Me	2003	Isabel Coixet	
My Man Godfrey	1936	Gregory La Cava	
My Name Is Bruce	2007	Bruce Campbell	
My Name Is Joe	1998	Ken Loach	
My Name Is Julia Ross	1945	Joseph H. Lewis	
My Name Is Nobody	1973	Tonino Valerii	
My Neighbor Totoro	1988	Hayao Miyazaki	
My Own Private Idaho	1991	Gus Van Sant	
My Super Ex-Girlfriend	2006	Ivan Reitman	
My Winnipeg	2007	Guy Maddin	
Myra Breckinridge	1970	Michael Sarne	
The Mysterians	1957	Ishirō Honda	
Mysterious Island	1961	Cy Endfield	
Mystery Men	1999	Kinka Usher	
Mystery Train	1989	Jim Jarmusch	
