= List of cult films: O =

This is a list of cult films organized alphabetically by name. See List of cult films for main list.

Film	Year	Director	Source
O Brother, Where Art Thou?	2000	Coen brothers	
Ocean's 11	1960	Lewis Milestone	
Ocean's Eleven	2001	Steven Soderbergh	
Octavio Is Dead!	2018	Sook-Yin Lee	
The Odd Couple	1968	Gene Saks	
Odd Man Out	1947	Carol Reed	
Oedipus Rex	1967	Pier Paolo Pasolini	
Of Freaks and Men	1998	Aleksei Balabanov	
Of Human Bondage	1934	John Cromwell	
Of Time and the City	2008	Terence Davies	
The Offence	1973	Sidney Lumet	
The Official Story	1985	Luis Puenzo	
Office Space	1999	Mike Judge	
Oh! What a Lovely War	1969	Richard Attenborough	
O.K. Connery (also known as Operation Kid Brother)	1967	Alberto De Martino	
The Old Dark House	1932	James Whale	
Oldboy	2003	Park Chan-wook	
Olympia Part One: Festival of the Nations	1938	Leni Riefenstahl	
The Omega Man	1971	Boris Sagal	
The Omen	1976	Richard Donner	
On Her Majesty's Secret Service	1969	Peter R. Hunt	
On the Beach	1959	Stanley Kramer	
On the Waterfront	1954	Elia Kazan	
Once Upon a Time in America	1984	Sergio Leone	
Once Upon a Time in China	1991	Tsui Hark	
Once Upon a Time in the West	1968	Sergio Leone	
One Cut of the Dead	2017	Shin'ichirō Ueda	
One Flew Over The Cuckoo’s Nest	1975	Miloš Forman	
One from the Heart	1982	Francis Ford Coppola	
One Hundred Days in Palermo	1984	Giuseppe Ferrara	
One Million Years B.C.	1966	Don Chaffey	
One-Eyed Jacks	1961	Marlon Brando	
One-Eyed Monster	2008	Adam Fields	
Ong-Bak: Muay Thai Warrior	2003	Prachya Pinkaew	
The Opening of Misty Beethoven	1976	Radley Metzger	
Opening Night	1977	John Cassavetes	
Operation Kid Brother (also known as O.K. Connery)	1967	Alberto De Martino	
Ordet	1955	Carl Theodor Dreyer	
The Orphanage	2007	J. A. Bayona	
Orpheus (also known as Orphée)	1950	Jean Cocteau	
OSS 117: Cairo, Nest of Spies	2006	Michel Hazanavicius	
Otaku no Video	1991	Takeshi Mori	
Other People's Money	1991	Norman Jewison	
The Other Side of the Bed	2002	Emilio Martínez Lázaro	
Our Daily Bread	2005	Nikolaus Geyrhalter	
Our Hitler (also known as Hitler: A Film from Germany)	1977	Hans-Jürgen Syberberg	
Out of the Past (also known as Build My Gallows High)	1947	Jacques Tourneur	
Out of Sight	1998	Steven Soderbergh	
Outland	1981	Peter Hyams	
The Outlaw	1943	Howard Hughes	
The Outlaw Josey Wales	1976	Clint Eastwood	
Outrageous!	1977	Richard Benner	
The Outsiders	1983	Francis Ford Coppola	
Over the Edge	1979	Jonathan Kaplan	
Owo Blow: The Genesis	1997	Tade Ogidan	
