= List of cult films: C =

This is a list of cult films organized alphabetically by name. See List of cult films for main list.

Film	Year	Director	Source
Cabaret	1972	Bob Fosse	
The Cabinet of Dr. Caligari	1919	Robert Wiene	
The Cable Guy	1996	Ben Stiller	
Caché	2005	Michael Haneke	
Café Flesh	1982	Stephen Sayadian	
La Cage aux Folles	1978	Édouard Molinaro	
Caged Heat	1974	Jonathan Demme	
Calendar	1993	Atom Egoyan	
Caliber 9	1972	Fernando Di Leo	
California Split	1974	Robert Altman	
Caligula	1979	Tinto Brass	
Calvaire	2005	Fabrice Du Welz	
Camille	1936	George Cukor	
Can't Stop the Music	1980	Nancy Walker	
The Candidate	1972	Michael Ritchie	
Candy Mountain	1987	Robert Frank and Rudy Wurlitzer	
Cannibal Ferox	1981	Umberto Lenzi	
Cannibal Girls	1973	Ivan Reitman	
Cannibal Holocaust	1980	Ruggero Deodato	
The Cannibal Man	1972	Eloy de la Iglesia	
Cannibal! The Musical	1993	Trey Parker	
The Cannonball Run	1981	Hal Needham	
Cape Fear	1962	J. Lee Thompson	
Capricorn One	1978	Peter Hyams	
Captain Blood	1935	Michael Curtiz	
Captain Kronos – Vampire Hunter	1974	Brian Clemens	
Captivity	2007	Roland Joffé	
Capturing the Friedmans	2003	Andrew Jarecki	
Carandiru	2003	Héctor Babenco	
Caravaggio	1986	Derek Jarman	
Carnal Knowledge	1971	Mike Nichols	
Carnival of Souls	1962	Herk Harvey	
Carny	1980	Robert Kaylor	
Carrie	1976	Brian De Palma	
Carry On Cleo	1964	Gerald Thomas	
Carry On Don't Lose Your Head (also known as Don't Lose Your Head)	1967	Gerald Thomas	
Carry On Follow That Camel (also known as Follow That Camel)	1967	Gerald Thomas	
Carry On Up the Khyber (also known as Up the Khyber)	1968	Gerald Thomas	
The Cars That Ate Paris	1974	Peter Weir	
Cartouche	1962	Philippe de Broca	
Casa de los babys	2003	John Sayles	
Casablanca	1942	Michael Curtiz	
The Case of the Mukkinese Battle-Horn	1956	Joseph Sterling	
Casino	1995	Martin Scorsese	
Casino Royale	1967	Multiple	
Casino Royale	2006	Martin Campbell	
The Castle	1997	Rob Sitch	
Castle in the Sky	1986	Hayao Miyazaki	
Cat Ballou	1965	Elliot Silverstein	
Cat City	1986	Béla Ternovszky	
The Cat Concerto	1947	William Hanna and Joseph Barbera	
Cat People	1942	Jacques Tourneur	
Cat-Women of the Moon	1953	Arthur Hilton	
Catch My Soul (also known as Santa Fe Satan)	1974	Patrick McGoohan	
Catch-22	1970	Mike Nichols	
Catwoman	2004	Pitof	
Cecil B. Demented	2000	John Waters	
The Celebration	1998	Thomas Vinterberg	
The Cell	2000	Tarsem Singh	
The Celluloid Closet	1996	Rob Epstein and Jeffrey Friedman	
Cemetery Girls (also known as The Velvet Vampire)	1971	Stephanie Rothman	
Cemetery Man	1994	Michele Soavi	
Chafed Elbows	1966	Robert Downey Sr.	
Chained Heat	1983	Paul Nicholas	
Chainsaw Sally	2004	Jimmyo Burril	
Chameli Ki Shaadi	1986	Basu Chatterjee	
Champion of Death (also known as Karate Bullfighter)	1975	Kazuhiko Yamaguchi	
Un chant d'amour	1954	Jean Genet	
The Chant of Jimmie Blacksmith	1978	Fred Schepisi	
Charley Varrick	1973	Don Siegel	
Charlie Chan at the Opera	1936	H. Bruce Humberstone	
Chashme Buddoor	1981	Sai Paranjpye	
Chelsea Girls	1966	Andy Warhol and Paul Morrissey	
The Chess Player	1927	Raymond Bernard	
Chicken Run	2000	Peter Lord and Nick Park	
Chicks in White Satin	1993	Elaine Holliman	
Un Chien Andalou	1929	Luis Buñuel	
Child's Play	1988	Tom Holland	
Child's Play 3	1991	Jack Bender	
Children of Men	2006	Alfonso Cuarón	
Children of Paradise	1945	Marcel Carné	
The Children's Hour	1961	William Wyler	
Chilly Scenes of Winter	1979	Joan Micklin Silver	
Chinatown	1974	Roman Polanski	
A Chinese Ghost Story	1987	Ching Siu-Tung	
Chinese Opium Den	1894	Thomas Edison	
Chitty Chitty Bang Bang	1968	Ken Hughes	
Chloe	2009	Atom Egoyan	
Choose Me	1984	Alan Rudolph	
Chopper	2000	Andrew Dominik	
A Chorus Line	1985	Richard Attenborough	
Christiane F.	1981	Uli Edel	
Christine	1983	John Carpenter	
Christmas on Mars	2008	Wayne Coyne	
A Christmas Story	1983	Bob Clark	
The Chronicle of Anna Magdalena Bach	1968	Jean-Marie Straub and Danièle Huillet	
Chungking Express	1994	Wong Kar-wai	
Chūshingura: Hana no Maki, Yuki no Maki (also known as 47 Ronin)	1962	Hiroshi Inagaki	
Ciao! Manhattan	1972	John Palmer and David Weisman	
The Cincinnati Kid	1965	Norman Jewison	
Cinema Paradiso	1988	Giuseppe Tornatore	
Cinemania	2002	Angela Christlieb and Stephen Kijak	
The Circus	1928	Charlie Chaplin	
Circus of Horrors	1960	Sidney Hayers	
Cisco Pike	1972	Bill L. Norton	
La Cité des enfants perdus (also known as The City of Lost Children)	1995	Jean-Pierre Jeunet and Marc Caro	
Citizen Kane	1941	Orson Welles	
City of God	2002	Fernando Meirelles and Kátia Lund	
The City of Lost Children (also known as La Cité des enfants perdus)	1995	Jean-Pierre Jeunet and Marc Caro	
The City of Lost Souls	2000	Takashi Miike	
City of Men	2007	Paulo Morelli	
City of the Living Dead	1980	Lucio Fulci	
City on Fire	1987	Ringo Lam	
Civilization	1916	Reginald Barker, Thomas H. Ince, and Raymond B. West	
Clash of the Titans	1981	Desmond Davis	
Claws of Iron (also known as Claws of Steel and Tetsu no tsume)	1951	Nobuo Adachi	
Clean, Shaven	1993	Lodge Kerrigan	
Clerk	1989	Manoj Kumar	
Clerks	1994	Kevin Smith	
Clockers	1995	Spike Lee	
The Clockmaker (also known as The Watchmaker of St. Paul)	1974	Bertrand Tavernier	
A Clockwork Orange	1971	Stanley Kubrick	
The Clones of Bruce Lee	1980	Joseph Kong and Nam Gi-Nam	
Close Encounters of the Third Kind	1977	Steven Spielberg	
Close-Up	1990	Abbas Kiarostami	
Closely Watched Trains	1966	Jiří Menzel	
Cloverfield	2008	Matt Reeves	
The Clowns (also known as I clowns)	1970	Federico Fellini	
The Club	1980	Bruce Beresford	
Clue	1985	Jonathan Lynn	
Clueless	1995	Amy Heckerling	
Cobra Verde	1987	Werner Herzog	
Cobra Woman	1944	Robert Siodmak	
Cockfighter	1974	Monte Hellman	
Cocksucker Blues	1972	Robert Frank	
Coffy	1973	Jack Hill	
Cold Fever	1995	Friðrik Þór Friðriksson	
The Collector	1965	William Wyler	
College	1927	James W. Horne and Buster Keaton	
The Color of Pomegranates	1969	Sergei Parajanov	
Colossus: The Forbin Project	1970	Joseph Sargent	
Com Licença, Eu Vou à Luta	1986	Lui Farias	
Come and See	1985	Elem Klimov	
Commando	1985	Mark L. Lester	
La Commune (Paris, 1871)	2000	Peter Watkins	
The Company of Wolves	1984	Neil Jordan	
Conan the Barbarian	1982	John Milius	
Coneheads	1993	Steve Barron	
Confessions of a Cheat (also known as Le Roman d'un tricheur and The Story of a Cheat)	1936	Sacha Guitry	
The Conformist	1970	Bernardo Bertolucci	
The Connection	1961	Shirley Clarke	
The Conqueror Worm (also known as Witchfinder General)	1968	Michael Reeves	
The Consequences of Love	2004	Paolo Sorrentino	
Contempt	1963	Jean-Luc Godard	
Content	2010	Chris Petit	
Control	2007	Anton Corbijn	
Convent of the Sacred Beast (also known as School of the Holy Beast and The Transgressor)	1974	Norifumi Suzuki	
The Conversation	1974	Francis Ford Coppola	
Coogan's Bluff	1968	Don Siegel	
The Cook, the Thief, His Wife & Her Lover	1989	Peter Greenaway	
The Cool and the Crazy	1958	William Witney	
Cool Hand Luke	1967	Stuart Rosenberg	
Cool Runnings	1993	Jon Turteltaub	
Cool World	1992	Ralph Bakshi	
Coonskin	1975	Ralph Bakshi	
Le Corbeau	1943	Henri-Georges Clouzot	
The Corpse Grinders	1971	Ted V. Mikels	
Cosh Boy (also known as The Slasher)	1953	Lewis Gilbert	
The Cottage	2008	Paul Andrew Williams	
The Cotton Club	1984	Francis Ford Coppola	
Count Dracula's Great Love	1973	Javier Aguirre	
Countess Dracula	1971	Peter Sasdy	
Coup de Torchon (also known as Clean Slate)	1981	Bertrand Tavernier	
The Court Jester	1955	Melvin Frank and Norman Panama	
The Cove	2009	Louie Psihoyos	
The Craft	1996	Andrew Fleming	
The Cranes Are Flying	1957	Mikhail Kalatozov	
Crank	2006	Mark Neveldine and Brian Taylor	
Crash	1996	David Cronenberg	
The Crawling Hand	1963	Herbert L. Strock	
Craze	1974	Freddie Francis	
Crazed Beast (also known as Savage Beast Goes Mad and Kurutta yaju)	1976	Sadao Nakajima	
The Crazies	1973	George A. Romero	
The Creator's Game	1999	Bruce Troxell	
Creature from the Black Lagoon	1954	Jack Arnold	
Creature of the Walking Dead	1965	Jerry Warren	
The Creeping Unknown (also known as The Quatermass Xperiment)	1955	Val Guest	
The Cremator	1969	Juraj Herz	
The Crime of Monsieur Lange	1936	Jean Renoir	
Crimewave	1985	Sam Raimi	
The Criminal Life of Archibaldo de la Cruz	1955	Luis Buñuel	
The Crimson Pirate	1952	Robert Siodmak	
Cronos	1993	Guillermo del Toro	
Cross of Iron	1977	Sam Peckinpah	
The Crossing	2018	Bai Xue	
Crossing the Bridge: The Sound of Istanbul	2005	Fatih Akın	
Crouching Tiger, Hidden Dragon	2000	Ang Lee	
Croupier	1998	Mike Hodges	
The Crow	1994	Alex Proyas	
Crumb	1994	Terry Zwigoff	
Cry of the Banshee	1970	Gordon Hessler	
Cry-Baby	1990	John Waters	
Cube	1997	Vincenzo Natali	
Cul-de-sac	1966	Roman Polanski	
Cure	1997	Kiyoshi Kurosawa	
The Curse of Frankenstein	1957	Terence Fisher	
Curse of the Devil (also known as El Retorno de Walpurgis and The Return of Walpurgis)	1973	Carlos Aured	
The Curse of Willow Song	2020	Karen Lam	
Cutter's Way	1981	Ivan Passer	
Cutthroat Island	1995	Renny Harlin	
