= List of cult films: P =

This is a list of cult films organized alphabetically by name. See List of cult films for main list.

| Film | Year | Director | Source |
|---|---|---|---|
| Pale Flower | 1964 | Masahiro Shinoda | |
| Palindromes | 2004 | Todd Solondz | |
| Pan's Labyrinth | 2006 | Guillermo del Toro | |
| Panda and the Magic Serpent (also known as The Great White Snake Enchantress and The Tale of the White Serpent) | 1958 | Taiji Yabushita | |
| Pandora's Box (also known as Die Büchse der Pandora) | 1929 | G. W. Pabst | |
| The Panic in Needle Park | 1971 | Jerry Schatzberg | |
| Panic in the Streets | 1950 | Elia Kazan | |
| Panic in Year Zero! | 1962 | Ray Milland | |
| Pantyhose Hero | 1990 | Sammo Hung | |
| Paperhouse | 1988 | Bernard Rose | |
| Papillon | 1973 | Franklin J. Schaffner | |
| Paradise Lost: The Child Murders at Robin Hood Hills | 1996 | Joe Berlinger and Bruce Sinofsky | |
| The Parallax View | 1974 | Alan J. Pakula | |
| Paranormal Activity | 2007 | Oren Peli | |
| Parents | 1989 | Bob Balaban | |
| Paris Blues | 1961 | Martin Ritt | |
| Paris, Texas | 1984 | Wim Wenders | |
| The Passenger | 1975 | Michelangelo Antonioni | |
| The Passion of Joan of Arc | 1928 | Carl Theodor Dreyer | |
| The Passion of the Christ | 2004 | Mel Gibson | |
| Passport to Pimlico | 1949 | Henry Cornelius | |
| Pat Garrett and Billy the Kid | 1973 | Sam Peckinpah | |
| Pather Panchali | 1955 | Satyajit Ray | |
| Paths of Glory | 1957 | Stanley Kubrick | |
| Pearl | 2022 | Ti West | |
| Peeping Tom | 1960 | Michael Powell | |
| Pee-wee's Big Adventure | 1985 | Tim Burton | |
| Peggy Sue Got Married | 1986 | Francis Ford Coppola | |
| The Peking Man | 1997 | Junya Sato | |
| Penny Serenade | 1941 | George Stevens | |
| Perfect | 1985 | James Bridges | |
| Perfect Blue | 1997 | Satoshi Kon | |
| Performance | 1970 | Donald Cammell and Nicolas Roeg | |
| Persona | 1966 | Ingmar Bergman | |
| Personal Best | 1982 | Robert Towne | |
| Le petit amour (also known as Kung Fu Master) | 1988 | Agnès Varda | |
| Pete Kelly's Blues | 1955 | Jack Webb | |
| Petulia | 1968 | Richard Lester | |
| Phantasm | 1979 | Don Coscarelli | |
| The Phantom Carriage | 1921 | Victor Sjöström | |
| The Phantom Empire | 1935 | Otto Brower and B. Reeves Eason | |
| Phantom from Space | 1953 | W. Lee Wilder | |
| The Phantom of the Opera | 1925 | Rupert Julian | |
| Phantom of the Paradise | 1974 | Brian De Palma | |
| The Phantom Planet | 1961 | William Marshall | |
| The Phantom Tollbooth | 1970 | Chuck Jones, Abe Levitow, Dave Monahan | |
| The Phenix City Story | 1955 | Phil Karlson | |
| Pi | 1998 | Darren Aronofsky | |
| The Piano | 1993 | Jane Campion | |
| Pickpocket | 1959 | Robert Bresson | |
| Pickup on South Street | 1953 | Samuel Fuller | |
| Picnic at Hanging Rock | 1975 | Peter Weir | |
| Pig | 2021 | Michael Sarnoski | |
| Pigsty (also known as Porcile) | 1969 | Pier Paolo Pasolini | |
| "Pimpernel" Smith | 1941 | Leslie Howard | |
| Pink Flamingos | 1972 | John Waters | |
| Pink Floyd – The Wall | 1982 | Alan Parker | |
| Piranha | 1978 | Joe Dante | |
| The Pirate | 1948 | Vincente Minnelli | |
| Pirates of the Caribbean: At World's End | 2007 | Gore Verbinski | |
| Pirates of the Caribbean: The Curse of the Black Pearl | 2003 | Gore Verbinski | |
| Pirates of the Caribbean: Dead Man's Chest | 2006 | Gore Verbinski | |
| The Pit | 1981 | Lew Lehman | |
| Plan 9 from Outer Space | 1959 | Ed Wood | |
| Planet of the Apes | 1968 | Franklin J. Schaffner | |
| Planet of the Vampires | 1965 | Mario Bava | |
| La Planète sauvage (also known as Fantastic Planet) | 1973 | René Laloux | |
| Planet Terror | 2007 | Robert Rodriguez | |
| Play It Again, Sam | 1972 | Herbert Ross | |
| Play Misty for Me | 1971 | Clint Eastwood | |
| The Player | 1992 | Robert Altman | |
| The Playhouse | 1921 | Buster Keaton and Eddie Cline | |
| Playing the Field (also known as L'arbitro) | 1974 | Luigi Filippo D'Amico | |
| Pleasantville | 1998 | Gary Ross | |
| The Pledge | 2001 | Sean Penn | |
| Point Blank | 1967 | John Boorman | |
| Point Break | 1991 | Kathryn Bigelow | |
| Poison | 1991 | Todd Haynes | |
| Poison Ivy | 1992 | Katt Shea | |
| Police | 1985 | Maurice Pialat | |
| Police Academy | 1984 | Hugh Wilson | |
| Poltergeist | 1982 | Tobe Hooper | |
| Polyester | 1981 | John Waters | |
| Pootie Tang | 2001 | Louis C.K. | |
| Porcile (also known as Pigsty) | 1969 | Pier Paolo Pasolini | |
| Porco Rosso | 1992 | Hayao Miyazaki | |
| Porgy and Bess | 1959 | Otto Preminger | |
| The Pornographer | 2001 | Bertrand Bonello | |
| Portrait of Jason | 1967 | Shirley Clarke | |
| The Poseidon Adventure | 1972 | Ronald Neame | |
| Possession | 1981 | Andrzej Żuławski | |
| The Possession of Virginia (also known as Le diable est parmi nous and Satan's Sabbath) | 1972 | Jean Beaudin | |
| The Postman | 1997 | Kevin Costner | |
| The Postman Always Rings Twice | 1981 | Bob Rafelson | |
| Il Posto | 1961 | Ermanno Olmi | |
| A Prairie Home Companion | 2006 | Robert Altman | |
| Precious | 2009 | Lee Daniels | |
| Prelude to War | 1942 | Frank Capra | |
| The President's Analyst | 1967 | Theodore J. Flicker | |
| The Prestige | 2006 | Christopher Nolan | |
| Pretty Baby | 1978 | Louis Malle | |
| Pretty Poison | 1968 | Noel Black | |
| The Price of Power | 1969 | Tonino Valerii | |
| Primate | 1974 | Frederick Wiseman | |
| Primer | 2004 | Shane Carruth | |
| Primitive London | 1965 | Arnold L. Miller | |
| Prince of Darkness | 1987 | John Carpenter | |
| The Prince of Tides | 1991 | Barbra Streisand | |
| The Princess Bride | 1987 | Rob Reiner | |
| Princess Mononoke | 1997 | Hayao Miyazaki | |
| The Prisoner of Zenda | 1937 | John Cromwell | |
| The Private Life of Sherlock Holmes | 1970 | Billy Wilder | |
| The Private Lives of Adam and Eve | 1960 | Mickey Rooney and Albert Zugsmith | |
| Prizzi's Honor | 1985 | John Huston | |
| The Producers | 1967 | Mel Brooks | |
| Prophecies of Nostradamus | 1974 | Toshio Masuda | |
| Prophecy | 1979 | John Frankenheimer | |
| A Prophet | 2009 | Jacques Audiard | |
| Prospero's Books | 1991 | Peter Greenaway | |
| The Prowler | 1981 | Joseph Zito | |
| Predator | 1987 | John McTiernan | |
| Psych-Out | 1968 | Richard Rush | |
| Psycho | 1960 | Alfred Hitchcock | |
| Psycho Beach Party | 2000 | Robert Lee King | |
| Psychomania | 1973 | Don Sharp | |
| Pulgasari | 1985 | Shin Sang-ok | |
| Pulp Fiction | 1994 | Quentin Tarantino | |
| Punisher: War Zone | 2008 | Lexi Alexander | |
| Punishment Park | 1971 | Peter Watkins | |
| Purana Mandir | 1984 | Tulsi Ramsay and Shyam Ramsay | |
| Purple Noon | 1960 | René Clément | |
| Pursued | 1947 | Raoul Walsh | |
| Putney Swope | 1969 | Robert Downey, Sr. | |
| Pygmalion | 1938 | Anthony Asquith and Leslie Howard | |
| The Pyramid | 1976 | Gary Kent | |
