= List of cult films: N =

This is a list of cult films organized alphabetically by name. See List of cult films for main list.

Film	Year	Director	Source
Naked Killer	1992	Clarence Fok Yiu-leung	
The Naked Kiss	1964	Samuel Fuller	
Naked Lunch	1991	David Cronenberg	
The Naked Prey	1965	Cornel Wilde	
Naked Tango	1990	Leonard Schrader	
The Nanny	1965	Seth Holt	
Nanook of the North	1922	Robert J. Flaherty	
Napoléon	1927	Abel Gance	
Napoleon Dynamite	2004	Jared Hess	
Narc	2002	Joe Carnahan	
Narcotic	1933	Dwain Esper and Vival Sodar't	
The Narrow Margin	1952	Richard Fleischer	
Nashville	1975	Robert Altman	
National Lampoon's Animal House (also known as Animal House)	1978	John Landis	
The Natural	1984	Barry Levinson	
Natural Born Killers	1994	Oliver Stone	
Nausicaä of the Valley of the Wind	1984	Hayao Miyazaki	
The Navigator: A Medieval Odyssey	1988	Vincent Ward	
The Navy vs. the Night Monsters	1966	Michael A. Hoey	
Nazarín	1959	Luis Buñuel	
The Nazis Strike	1943	Frank Capra and Anatole Litvak	
Near Dark	1987	Kathryn Bigelow	
Nekromantik	1987	Jörg Buttgereit	
Nekromantik 2	1991	Jörg Buttgereit	
Network	1976	Sidney Lumet	
Never Cry Wolf	1983	Carroll Ballard	
Never Met Picasso	1996	Stephen Kijak	
New Jack City	1991	Mario van Peebles	
New Nightmare (also known as Wes Craven's New Nightmare)	1994	Wes Craven	
The New One-Armed Swordsman	1971	Chang Cheh	
New Wave Hookers	1985	Gregory Dark	
New York, New York	1977	Martin Scorsese	
Night and the City	1950	Jules Dassin	
Night Games	1966	Mai Zetterling	
The Night Is Short, Walk On Girl	2017	Masaaki Yuasa	
Night Mail	1936	Harry Watt and Basil Wright	
Night Moves	1975	Arthur Penn	
Night Nurse	1931	William A. Wellman	
Night of the Bloody Apes	1972	René Cardona	
Night of the Comet	1984	Thom Eberhardt	
Night of the Demon	1957	Jacques Tourneur	
Night of the Demons	1988	Kevin Tenney	
The Night of the Hunter	1955	Charles Laughton	
Night of the Lepus	1972	William F. Claxton	
Night of the Living Dead	1968	George A. Romero	
The Night of the Shooting Stars	1982	Paolo Taviani and Vittorio Taviani	
The Night Porter	1974	Liliana Cavani	
Night Watch	2004	Timur Bekmambetov	
Nighthawks	1978	Ron Peck	
Nightmare Alley	1947	Edmund Goulding	
Nightmare	1981	Romano Scavolini	
Nightmare Circus (also known as The Barn of the Naked Dead and Terror Circus)	1973	Alan Rudolph	
Nightmare in Wax	1969	Bud Townsend	
The Nightmare Before Christmas	1993	Henry Selick	
A Nightmare on Elm Street	1984	Wes Craven	
A Nightmare on Elm Street 2: Freddy's Revenge	1985	Jack Sholder	
Nights of Cabiria	1957	Federico Fellini	
Nikita (also known as La Femme Nikita)	1990	Luc Besson	
Nil by Mouth	1997	Gary Oldman	
Ninotchka	1939	Ernst Lubitsch	
The Ninth Configuration	1980	William Peter Blatty	
Nixon	1995	Oliver Stone	
No Blade of Grass	1970	Cornel Wilde	
No Country for Old Men	2007	Coen brothers	
No Smoking	2007	Anurag Kashyap	
No Such Thing	2001	Hal Hartley	
Noboru Ando's Chronicle of Fugitive Days and Sex	1976	Noboru Tanaka	
North by Northwest	1959	Alfred Hitchcock	
Nosferatu: A Symphony of Horror	1922	F. W. Murnau	
Not Quite Hollywood: The Wild, Untold Story of Ozploitation!	2008	Mark Hartley	
Nothing	2003	Vincenzo Natali	
Nothing Lasts Forever	1984	Tom Schiller	
Notorious	1946	Alfred Hitchcock	
Now, Voyager	1942	Irving Rapper	
Nowhere Boy	2009	Sam Taylor-Wood	
The Nun	1966	Jacques Rivette	
Les Nuits Fauves (also known as Savage Nights)	1992	Cyril Collard	
The Nutty Professor	1963	Jerry Lewis	
