= List of cult films: A =

This is a list of cult films organized alphabetically by name. See List of cult films for main list.

Film	Year	Director	Source
À ma sœur! (also known as Fat Girl)	2001	Catherine Breillat	
A.I. Artificial Intelligence	2001	Steven Spielberg	
Aag (or more fully Ram Gopal Varma Ki Aag)	2007	Ram Gopal Varma	
Abbott and Costello Meet Dr. Jekyll and Mr. Hyde	1953	Charles Lamont	
Abbott and Costello Meet Frankenstein (also known as Bud Abbott and Lou Costello Meet Frankenstein)	1948	Charles Barton	
Above the Law	1988	Andrew Davis	
The Abyss	1989	James Cameron	
The Accused	1988	Jonathan Kaplan	
Ace in the Hole	1951	Billy Wilder	
The Acid Eaters	1968	Byron Mabe	
Across 110th Street	1972	Barry Shear	
The Act of Seeing with One's Own Eyes	1971	Stan Brakhage	
Adam's Rib	1949	George Cukor	
The Addiction	1995	Abel Ferrara	
L'addition	1984	Denis Amar	
The Adventures of Baron Munchausen	1989	Terry Gilliam	
The Adventures of Barry McKenzie	1972	Bruce Beresford	
The Adventures of Buckaroo Banzai Across the 8th Dimension	1984	W. D. Richter	
The Adventures of Priscilla, Queen of the Desert	1994	Stephan Elliott	
The Adventures of Robin Hood	1938	Michael Curtiz and William Keighley	
The Aerial	2007	Esteban Sapir	
The Affairs of Anatol	1921	Cecil B. DeMille	
Afghan Stories	2002	Taran Davies	
After Hours	1985	Martin Scorsese	
L'Age d'Or	1930	Luis Buñuel	
The Age of Stupid	2009	Franny Armstrong	
Agneepath	1990	Mukul S. Anand	
Aguirre, the Wrath of God	1972	Werner Herzog	
Airplane!	1980	Jim Abrahams, David Zucker, Jerry Zucker	
Airport '77	1977	Jerry Jameson	
Akira	1988	Katsuhiro Otomo	
Alakazam the Great	1960	Taiji Yabushita and Daisaku Shirakawa	
Alferd Packer: The Musical (also known as Cannibal! The Musical)	1993	Trey Parker	
Alfie	1966	Lewis Gilbert	
Ali Baba and the Forty Thieves	1944	Arthur Lubin	
Ali: Fear Eats the Soul	1974	Rainer Werner Fassbinder	
Alice	1988	Jan Švankmajer	
Alice Doesn't Live Here Anymore	1974	Martin Scorsese	
Alice in Acidland	1969	Donn Greer	
Alice, Sweet Alice	1976	Alfred Sole	
Alice's Restaurant	1969	Arthur Penn	
Alien	1979	Ridley Scott	
Aliens	1986	James Cameron	
Alive	1993	Frank Marshall	
All About Eve	1950	Joseph L. Mankiewicz	
All About My Mother	1999	Pedro Almodóvar	
All Quiet on the Western Front	1930	Lewis Milestone	
All That Heaven Allows	1955	Douglas Sirk	
All That Jazz	1979	Bob Fosse	
All That Money Can Buy (also known as The Devil and Daniel Webster)	1941	William Dieterle	
All the Colors of the Dark	1972	Sergio Martino	
All the President's Men	1976	Alan J. Pakula	
Alligator	1980	Lewis Teague	
Allures	1961	Jordan Belson	
Almost Famous	2000	Cameron Crowe	
Alone in the Dark	1982	Jack Sholder	
Alone, Life Wastes Andy Hardy	1998	Martin Arnold	
Alphaville	1965	Jean-Luc Godard	
Altered States	1980	Ken Russell	
Alucarda	1978	Juan López Moctezuma	
The Amazing Colossal Man	1957	Bert I. Gordon	
The Amazing Transparent Man	1960	Edgar G. Ulmer	
Amazon Women on the Moon	1987	Multiple	
Amélie	2001	Jean-Pierre Jeunet	
The American Friend (also known as Der amerikanische Freund)	1977	Wim Wenders	
American Gigolo	1980	Paul Schrader	
American Graffiti	1973	George Lucas	
An American in Paris	1951	Vincente Minnelli	
American Mary	2012	Jen and Sylvia Soska	
American Pie	1999	Paul Weitz	
American Psycho	2000	Mary Harron	
American Splendor	2003	Shari Springer Berman and Robert Pulcini	
An American Werewolf in London	1981	John Landis	
Amerika	1987	Donald Wrye	
Der amerikanische Freund (also known as The American Friend)	1977	Wim Wenders	
Amityville 3-D	1983	Richard Fleischer	
Amores perros	2000	Alejandro González Iñárritu	
Anatomy of a Murder	1959	Otto Preminger	
Anchorman: The Legend of Ron Burgundy	2004	Adam McKay	
And God Created Woman	1956	Roger Vadim	
Andaz Apna Apna	1994	Rajkumar Santoshi	
The Anderson Tapes	1971	Sidney Lumet	
Andheri Raat Mein Diya Tere Haath Mein	1986	Dada Kondke	
Andrei Rublev	1966	Andrei Tarkovsky	
The Andromeda Strain	1971	Robert Wise	
Andy Warhol's Bad	1977	Jed Johnson	
An Angel at My Table	1990	Jane Campion	
Angel Heart	1987	Alan Parker	
Angel of Vengeance (also Ms. 45)	1981	Abel Ferrara	
The Angry Red Planet	1959	Ib Melchior	
Animal House	1978	John Landis	
The Animatrix	2003	Multiple	
Annie	1982	John Huston	
Annie Hall	1977	Woody Allen	
The Anniversary	1968	Roy Ward Baker	
Another Heaven	2000	George Iida	
Antichrist	2009	Lars von Trier	
Antonia's Line	1995	Marleen Gorris	
Antonio das Mortes	1969	Glauber Rocha	
Antropophagus	1980	Joe D'Amato	
The Apartment	1960	Billy Wilder	
Apartment Zero	1988	Martin Donovan	
Apocalypse Now	1979	Francis Ford Coppola	
The Appaloosa	1966	Sidney J. Furie	
April Captains	2000	Maria de Medeiros	
The Arena	1974	Steve Carver	
The Aristocrats	2005	Penn Jillette and Paul Provenza	
L'arbitro (also known as Playing the Field)	1974	Luigi Filippo D'Amico	
Armageddon	1998	Michael Bay	
Army of Darkness	1992	Sam Raimi	
Army of Shadows	1969	Jean-Pierre Melville	
Arsenic and Old Lace	1944	Frank Capra	
Ashes and Diamonds	1958	Andrzej Wajda	
Ashes of Time	1994	Wong Kar-wai	
The Asphalt Jungle	1950	John Huston	
The Asphyx (also known as The Horror of Death and Spirit of the Dead)	1972	Peter Newbrook	
The Assassination of Jesse James by the Coward Robert Ford	2007	Andrew Dominik	
Assault on Precinct 13	1976	John Carpenter	
Astro Boy (Mighty Atom, the Brave in Space)	1963	Osamu Tezuka	
The Astro-Zombies	1968	Ted V. Mikels	
The Astronaut Farmer	2006	Michael Polish	
Asylum	1972	Roy Ward Baker	
At Close Range	1986	James Foley	
At Midnight I'll Take Your Soul	1964	José Mojica Marins	
¡Átame! (also known as Tie Me Up! Tie Me Down!)	1989	Pedro Almodóvar	
Atlantic City	1980	Louis Malle	
The Atomic Submarine	1959	Spencer Gordon Bennet	
Attack of the 50 Foot Woman	1958	Nathan H. Juran	
Attack of the Crab Monsters	1957	Roger Corman	
Attack of the Giant Leeches	1959	Bernard L. Kowalski	
Attack of the Killer Tomatoes	1978	John DeBello	
Audition	1999	Takashi Miike	
Audrey Rose	1977	Robert Wise	
Australia	2008	Baz Luhrmann	
Auto Focus	2002	Paul Schrader	
Av – The Hunt	2020	Emre Akay	
Avatar (Note: See Cult film § Subcultural appeal and fandom and context about "cult blockbusters".)	2009	James Cameron	
L'Avventura	1960	Michelangelo Antonioni	
Awakening of the Beast	1970	José Mojica Marins	
Awakenings	1990	Penny Marshall	
The Awful Truth	1937	Leo McCarey	
