= List of cult films: Q =

This is a list of cult films organized alphabetically by name. See List of cult films for main list.

Film	Year	Director	Source
Q – The Winged Serpent	1982	Larry Cohen	
Quadrophenia	1979	Franc Roddam	
Quatermass and the Pit (also known as Five Million Years to Earth)	1967	Roy Ward Baker	
The Quatermass Xperiment (also known as The Creeping Unknown)	1955	Val Guest	
Queen Christina	1933	Rouben Mamoulian	
Queen Margot (also known as La Reine Margot)	1994	Patrice Chéreau	
Queen of Blood	1966	Curtis Harrington	
Queen of Outer Space	1958	Edward Bernds	
The Queen of Sheba Meets the Atom Man	1963	Ron Rice	
Querelle	1982	Rainer Werner Fassbinder	
A Question of Silence	1982	Marleen Gorris	
Quick Change	1990	Howard Franklin and Bill Murray	
Quiet Days in Clichy	1970	Jens Jørgen Thorsen	
The Quiet Earth	1985	Geoff Murphy	
The Quiet Man	1952	John Ford	
