= List of cult films: F =

This is a list of cult films organized alphabetically by name. See List of cult films for main list.

Film	Year	Director	Source
F for Fake	1973	Orson Welles and François Reichenbach	
The Fabulous Baker Boys	1989	Steve Kloves	
The Face of Another	1966	Hiroshi Teshigahara	
Face to Face	1967	Sergio Sollima	
Face to Face	1976	Ingmar Bergman	
Faces of Death	1978	Conan LeCilaire	
Factotum	2005	Bent Hamer	
Fahrenheit 451	1966	François Truffaut	
The Falcon and the Snowman	1985	John Schlesinger	
Falling Down	1993	Joel Schumacher	
Fame	1980	Alan Parker	
Family Life (also known as Wednesday's Child)	1971	Ken Loach	
Der Fan (also known as The Fan)	1982	Eckhart Schmidt	
Fanny and Alexander	1982	Ingmar Bergman	
Fantasia	1940	Multiple	
Fantastic Planet (also known as La Planète sauvage)	1973	Rene Laloux	
Fantastic Voyage	1966	Richard Fleischer	
Fantômas	1913-14	Louis Feuillade	
Far from Heaven	2002	Todd Haynes	
Farewell My Concubine	1993	Chen Kaige	
Farewell, My Lovely (also known as Murder, My Sweet)	1944	Edward Dmytryk	
Farewell, My Lovely	1975	Dick Richards	
Fargo	1996	The Coen Brothers	
Fascination	1979	Jean Rollin	
Fast Times at Ridgemont High	1982	Amy Heckerling	
Faster, Pussycat! Kill! Kill!	1965	Russ Meyer	
Fat City	1972	John Huston	
Fat Girl (also known as À ma sœur!)	2001	Catherine Breillat	
Fateful Findings	2014	Neil Breen	
Fathers' Day	1997	Ivan Reitman	
Faust	1926	F. W. Murnau	
Fear and Loathing in Las Vegas	1998	Terry Gilliam	
Fear Strikes Out	1957	Robert Mulligan	
The Fearless Vampire Killers	1967	Roman Polanski	
Fellini Satyricon	1969	Federico Fellini	
Female Convict Scorpion: Jailhouse 41	1972	Shunya Itō	
Female Prisoner #701: Scorpion	1972	Shunya Itō	
Female Slave Ship	1960	Yoshiki Onoda	
Female Trouble	1974	John Waters	
La Femme Nikita (also known as Nikita)	1990	Luc Besson	
Ferris Bueller's Day Off	1986	John Hughes	
Fiddler on the Roof	1971	Norman Jewison	
Field of Dreams	1989	Phil Alden Robinson	
Fiend Without a Face	1958	Arthur Crabtree	
The Fifth Element	1997	Luc Besson	
Fight Club	1999	David Fincher	
The Final Comedown (also known as Blast!)	1972	Oscar Williams	
Final Fantasy: The Spirits Within	2001	Hironobu Sakaguchi	
Fireworks (also known as Hana-bi)	1997	Takeshi Kitano	
First Blood	1982	Ted Kotcheff	
First Man into Space	1959	Robert Day	
The First Nudie Musical	1976	Mark Haggard and Bruce Kimmel	
First on the Moon	2005	Aleksei Fedorchenko	
First Spaceship on Venus (also known as The Silent Star)	1960	Kurt Maetzig	
The Fisher King	1991	Terry Gilliam	
Fist of Fury	1972	Lo Wei	
A Fistful of Dollars	1964	Sergio Leone	
Fitzcarraldo	1982	Werner Herzog	
Five Came Back	1939	John Farrow	
Five Deadly Venoms	1978	Chang Cheh	
Five Easy Pieces	1970	Bob Rafelson	
Five Million Years to Earth (also known as Quatermass and the Pit)	1967	Roy Ward Baker	
Five on the Black Hand Side	1973	Oscar Williams	
Flaming Creatures	1963	Jack Smith	
Flaming Star	1960	Don Siegel	
Flash Gordon	1980	Mike Hodges	
Flashdance	1983	Adrian Lyne	
Flavia the Heretic	1974	Gianfranco Mingozzi	
Flesh	1968	Paul Morrissey	
Flesh and Blood	1985	Paul Verhoeven	
The Flesh and the Fiends (also known as Mania)	1960	John Gilling	
Flesh for Frankenstein	1973	Paul Morrissey	
Flesh Gordon	1974	Michael Benveniste and Howard Ziehm	
Fleshpot on 42nd Street	1972	Andy Milligan	
Fletch	1985	Michael Ritchie	
Flower and Snake	1974	Masaru Konuma	
The Flower Thief	1960	Ron Rice	
The Fly	1958	Kurt Neumann	
Follow That Dream	1962	Gordon Douglas	
A Fool There Was	1915	Frank Powell	
Footlight Parade	1933	Lloyd Bacon	
For All Mankind	1989	Al Reinert	
For Y'ur Height Only (also known as For Your Height Only)	1981	Eddie Nicart	
Forbidden Planet	1956	Fred M. Wilcox	
Forbidden Zone	1980	Richard Elfman	
Force of Evil	1948	Abraham Polonsky	
The Forgotten (also known as Death Ward #13 and Don't Look in the Basement)	1973	S. F. Brownrigg	
Forty Guns	1957	Samuel Fuller	
Forty Shades of Blue	2005	Ira Sachs	
The Fountainhead	1949	King Vidor	
The Fourth Man (also known as The 4th Man)	1983	Paul Verhoeven	
Foxy Brown	1974	Jack Hill	
Frankenhooker	1990	Frank Henenlotter	
Frankenstein	1931	James Whale	
Frankenstein vs. the Creature from Blood Cove	2005	William Winckler	
Frankenstein's Castle of Freaks	1974	Dick Randall	
Frankenstein's Daughter	1958	Richard E. Cunha	
Freak Orlando	1981	Ulrike Ottinger	
Freaks	1932	Tod Browning	
Freddy vs. Jason	2003	Ronny Yu	
Freeway II: Confessions of a Trickbaby	1999	Matthew Bright	
Friday	1995	F. Gary Gray	
Friday Foster	1975	Arthur Marks	
Friday Night (also known as Vendredi soir)	2002	Claire Denis	
Friday the 13th	1980	Sean S. Cunningham	
Fright Night	1985	Tom Holland	
Frightmare	1974	Pete Walker	
Fritz the Cat	1972	Ralph Bakshi	
From Beyond the Grave	1974	Kevin Connor	
From Dusk till Dawn	1996	Robert Rodriguez	
The Front	1976	Martin Ritt	
Frownland	2007	Ronald Bronstein	
The Frozen Dead	1966	Herbert J. Leder	
Fudoh: The New Generation	1996	Takashi Miike	
Full Metal Yakuza	1997	Takashi Miike	
Funeral Parade of Roses	1969	Toshio Matsumoto	
Funny Games	1997	Michael Haneke	
Funny Ha Ha	2002	Andrew Bujalski	
The Fury	1978	Brian De Palma	
