= List of cult films: W =

This is a list of cult films organized alphabetically by name. See List of cult films for main list.

Film	Year	Director	Source
The Wackness	2008	Jonathan Levine	
The Wages of Fear	1953	Henri-Georges Clouzot	
Waiting for Guffman	1996	Christopher Guest	
Waitress	2007	Adrienne Shelly	
Wake Up and Dream	1934	Kurt Neumann	
Walden (also known as Diaries, Notes, and Sketches)	1968	Jonas Mekas	
Walk Hard: The Dewey Cox Story	2007	Jake Kasdan	
Walk on the Wild Side	1962	Edward Dmytryk	
Walkabout	1971	Nicolas Roeg	
WALL-E	2008	Andrew Stanton	
Waltz with Bashir	2008	Ari Folman	
Wanda	1970	Barbara Loden	
Wanda, the Sadistic Hypnotist (also known as The Sadistic Hypnotist)	1969	Greg Corarito	
The Wanderers	1979	Philip Kaufman	
The Wannsee Conference	1984	Heinz Schirk	
War and Peace	1967	Sergei Bondarchuk	
War Comes to America	1945	Frank Capra and Anatole Litvak	
The War Game	1966	Peter Watkins	
War Hunt	1962	Denis Sanders	
The War Is Over	1966	Alain Resnais	
War of the Colossal Beast	1958	Bert I. Gordon	
The War of the Gargantuas	1966	Ishirō Honda	
The War of the Worlds	1953	Byron Haskin	
Warning Sign	1985	Hal Barwood	
The Warped Ones	1960	Koreyoshi Kurahara	
The Warriors	1979	Walter Hill	
The Wasp Woman	1959	Roger Corman	
The Watchmaker of St. Paul (also known as The Clockmaker)	1974	Bertrand Tavernier	
Watchmen	2009	Zack Snyder	
Waterloo Bridge	1940	Mervyn LeRoy	
Waterworld	1995	Kevin Reynolds	
Wavelength	1967	Michael Snow	
The Way We Were	1973	Sydney Pollack	
The Wayward Cloud	2005	Tsai Ming-liang	
We Can't Go Home Again	1973	Nicholas Ray	
The Wedding Singer	1998	Frank Coraci	
Wednesday's Child (also known as Family Life)	1971	Ken Loach	
Weekend	1967	Jean-Luc Godard	
Welcome Home Brother Charles (also known as Soul Vengeance)	1975	Jamaa Fanaka	
Welcome to the Dollhouse	1995	Todd Solondz	
Went the Day Well?	1942	Alberto Cavalcanti	
Werewolf of London	1935	Stuart Walker	
The Werewolf of Washington	1973	Milton Moses Ginsberg	
Werewolf Woman (also known as The Legend of the Wolf Woman)	1976	Rino Di Silvestro	
Wes Craven's New Nightmare (also known as New Nightmare)	1994	Wes Craven	
Westworld	1973	Michael Crichton	
Wet Hot American Summer	2001	David Wain	
What a Carve Up!	1961	Pat Jackson	
What Ever Happened to Aunt Alice?	1969	Lee H. Katzin	
What Ever Happened to Baby Jane?	1962	Robert Aldrich	
What's New Pussycat?	1965	Clive Donner	
What's Opera, Doc?	1957	Chuck Jones	
What's Up, Doc?	1972	Peter Bogdanovich	
What's Up, Tiger Lily?	1966	Woody Allen and Senkichi Taniguchi	
When Harry Met Sally...	1989	Rob Reiner	
When Night Is Falling	1995	Patricia Rozema	
When Strangers Marry	1944	William Castle	
When the Clouds Roll By	1919	Victor Fleming	
When Time Ran Out	1980	James Goldstone	
When We Were Kings	1996	Leon Gast	
Where Eagles Dare	1968	Brian G. Hutton	
Where's Poppa?	1970	Carl Reiner	
Whisky Galore!	1949	Alexander Mackendrick	
White Dog	1982	Samuel Fuller	
White Heat	1949	Raoul Walsh	
White Palace	1990	Luis Mandoki	
The White Ribbon	2009	Michael Haneke	
The White Snake Enchantress (also known as Panda and the Magic Serpent, The Great White Snake, and The Tale of the White Serpent)	1958	Taiji Yabushita	
White Sun of the Desert	1970	Vladimir Motyl	
White Zombie	1932	Victor Halperin	
Who Killed Brown Owl?	2004	Christine Molloy	
Who Killed Captain Alex?	2010	Nabwana I.G.G.	
Who Wants to Kill Jessie?	1966	Václav Vorlíček	
The Wicked Lady	1945	Leslie Arliss	
The Wicker Man	1973	Robin Hardy	
Wide Sargasso Sea	1993	John Duigan	
The Wild Angels	1966	Roger Corman	
Wild at Heart	1990	David Lynch	
The Wild Bunch	1969	Sam Peckinpah	
Wild Grass	2009	Alain Resnais	
Wild in the Streets	1968	Barry Shear	
The Wild One	1953	László Benedek	
Wild Seed	1965	Brian G. Hutton	
Wild Strawberries	1957	Ingmar Bergman	
Wild Style	1983	Charlie Ahearn	
Wild Target	2010	Jonathan Lynn	
Wild Wild West	1999	Barry Sonnenfeld	
William Winckler's Frankenstein vs. the Creature from Blood Cove (also known as Frankenstein vs. the Creature from Blood Cove)	2005	William Winckler	
Willow	1988	Ron Howard	
Willy Wonka & the Chocolate Factory	1971	Mel Stuart	
Wings of Desire	1987	Wim Wenders	
Winstanley	1975	Kevin Brownlow and Andrew Mollo	
Winter Kills	1979	William Richert	
The Winter War	1989	Pekka Parikka	
Wisconsin Death Trip	1999	James Marsh	
Wise Blood	1979	John Huston	
Witchcraft Through the Ages (also known as Häxan)	1922	Benjamin Christensen	
The Witches	1990	Nicolas Roeg	
The Witches of Eastwick	1987	George Miller	
Witchfinder General (also known as The Conqueror Worm)	1968	Michael Reeves	
Withnail and I	1987	Bruce Robinson	
Witness for the Prosecution	1957	Billy Wilder	
The Wiz	1978	Sidney Lumet	
The Wizard of Oz	1939	Victor Fleming	
Wolfen	1981	Michael Wadleigh	
Woman in the Dunes	1964	Hiroshi Teshigahara	
Woman in the Moon	1929	Fritz Lang	
A Woman Under the Influence	1974	John Cassavetes	
The Women	1939	George Cukor	
Women on the Verge of a Nervous Breakdown	1988	Pedro Almodóvar	
Woodstock	1970	Michael Wadleigh	
World's Biggest Gang Bang	1995	John T. Bone	
The World's Greatest Sinner	1962	Timothy Carey	
The Wormwood Star	1956	Curtis Harrington	
The Wounded Man	1983	Patrice Chéreau	
WR: Mysteries of the Organism	1971	Dušan Makavejev	
Wrath of Daimajin	1966	Kazuo Mori	
The Wrestler	2008	Darren Aronofsky	
Wuthering Heights	1939	William Wyler	
