= List of cult films =

List of films that generated cult following

Cult films are films with a dedicated and passionate following, often defined by their opposition to mainstream appeal and traditional cinematic norms. While the term lacks a singular definition, it generally includes films that inspire devoted fan engagement, such as cosplay, participatory screenings, and festivals. Some scholars argue that cult films must have a transgressive or subcultural quality, though definitions have expanded over time to include mainstream films with unconventional elements. Critics have noted that the term is increasingly vague, with mainstream recognition and marketing blurring its original oppositional identity. Cult films often thrive on their inherent contradictions—celebrated for qualities both good and bad, artistic and exploitative—highlighting the subjective nature of art and fandom.

The following is a list of cult films organized alphabetically by title:

- List of cult films: 0–9
- List of cult films: A
- List of cult films: B
- List of cult films: C
- List of cult films: D
- List of cult films: E
- List of cult films: F
- List of cult films: G
- List of cult films: H
- List of cult films: I
- List of cult films: J
- List of cult films: K
- List of cult films: L
- List of cult films: M
- List of cult films: N
- List of cult films: O
- List of cult films: P
- List of cult films: Q
- List of cult films: R
- List of cult films: S
- List of cult films: T
- List of cult films: U
- List of cult films: V
- List of cult films: W
- List of cult films: X
- List of cult films: Y
- List of cult films: Z

== See also ==
- B movie
- Midnight movie
- Sleeper hit
- Underground film
