= List of cult films: J =

This is a list of cult films organized alphabetically by name. See List of cult films for main list.

Film	Year	Director	Source
Jaane Bhi Do Yaaro	1983	Kundan Shah	
Jabberwocky	1977	Terry Gilliam	
Jackie Brown	1997	Quentin Tarantino	
Jail Bait	1954	Ed Wood	
Jailhouse Rock	1957	Richard Thorpe	
Jamón jamón	1992	Bigas Luna	
Jason and the Argonauts	1963	Don Chaffey	
Jassy	1947	Bernard Knowles	
Jaws	1975	Steven Spielberg	
Jaws 3-D	1983	Joe Alves	
Jazz on a Summer's Day	1959	Aram Avakian and Bert Stern	
Jeanne Dielman, 23 quai du Commerce, 1080 Bruxelles	1975	Chantal Akerman	
Jeremiah Johnson	1972	Sydney Pollack	
Jesse James Meets Frankenstein's Daughter	1966	William Beaudine	
Jesus of Montreal	1989	Denys Arcand	
La Jetée	1962	Chris Marker	
Jigoku (also known as The Sinners of Hell)	1960	Nobuo Nakagawa	
Jo Jeeta Wohi Sikandar	1992	Mansoor Khan	
Joan the Maid I: The Battles	1994	Jacques Rivette	
Joan the Maid II: The Prisons	1994	Jacques Rivette	
Jodorowsky's Dune	2013	Frank Pavich	
Joe's Apartment	1996	John Payson	
Johnny Got His Gun	1971	Dalton Trumbo	
Johnny Guitar	1954	Nicholas Ray	
The Joke	1969	Jaromil Jireš	
Josie and the Pussycats	2001	Harry Elfont and Deborah Kaplan	
Journey to the Center of Time	1967	David L. Hewitt	
Ju-On: The Grudge	2002	Takashi Shimizu	
Jubilee	1978	Derek Jarman	
Judas Was a Woman (also known as La Bête Humaine and The Human Beast)	1938	Jean Renoir	
Judge Dredd	1995	Danny Cannon	
Jules and Jim	1962	François Truffaut	
Junebug	2005	Phil Morrison	
The Jungle Book	1967	Wolfgang Reitherman	
Jungle Emperor (also known as Kimba the White Lion)	1966	Eiichi Yamamoto	
Juno	2007	Jason Reitman	
Jurassic Park	1993	Steven Spielberg	
Justine De Sade	1972	Claude Pierson	
