= List of cult films: Y =

This is a list of cult films organized alphabetically by name. See List of cult films for main list.

Film	Year	Director	Source
Y tu mamá también	2001	Alfonso Cuarón	
The Yakuza	1974	Sydney Pollack	
Yakuza Cruel Secrets - Arm Dismemberment	1976	Akira Shiizuka	
Yakuza Law	1969	Teruo Ishii	
Yantra	1957	James Whitney	
Yellow Submarine	1968	George Dunning	
Yesterday's Hero	1979	Neil Leifer	
Yield to the Night	1956	J. Lee Thompson	
Yog: Monster from Space (also known as Space Amoeba)	1970	Ishirō Honda	
Yojimbo	1961	Akira Kurosawa	
You Only Live Once	1937	Fritz Lang	
You, the Living	2007	Roy Andersson	
Young Frankenstein	1974	Mel Brooks	
The Young Poisoner's Handbook	1995	Benjamin Ross	
Young Törless	1966	Volker Schlöndorff	
