= List of cult films: Z =

This is a list of cult films organized alphabetically by name. See List of cult films for main list.

Film	Year	Director	Source
Z	1969	Costa-Gavras	
Zachariah	1971	George Englund	
Zardoz	1974	John Boorman	
Zatōichi	2003	Takeshi Kitano	
Zelig	1983	Woody Allen	
Zero for Conduct (French: Zéro de conduite)	1933	Jean Vigo	
Ziegfeld Follies	1945	Multiple	
Zodiac	2007	David Fincher	
Zoltan... Hound of Dracula (also known as Dracula's Dog)	1977	Albert Band	
Zombi 2 (Zombie, also known as Zombie Flesh Eaters)	1979	Lucio Fulci	
Zombies of Mora Tau (also known as The Dead That Walk)	1957	Edward L. Cahn	
Zoo	2007	Robinson Devor	
Zoo in Budapest	1933	Rowland V. Lee	
Zoolander	2001	Ben Stiller	
Zorba the Greek	1964	Michael Cacoyannis	
Zulu	1964	Cy Endfield	
