= List of cult films: K =

This is a list of cult films organized alphabetically by name. See List of cult films for main list.

Film	Year	Director	Source
Kaagaz Ke Phool	1959	Guru Dutt	
Kagemusha	1980	Akira Kurosawa	
Kaleidoscope	1966	Jack Smight	
Kamikaze Cop, Marihuana Syndicate	1970	Yukio Noda	
Kamikaze Girls	2004	Tetsuya Nakashima	
Karate Bullfighter (also known as Champion of Death)	1975	Kazuhiko Yamaguchi	
The Karate Kid	1984	John G. Avildsen	
Karate Kiba (also known as The Bodyguard and Bodyguard Kiba)	1973	Ryuichi Takamori	
Katalin Varga	2009	Peter Strickland	
Katha	1983	Sai Paranjpye	
The Keep	1983	Michael Mann	
The Kennel Murder Case	1933	Michael Curtiz	
Keoma	1976	Enzo G. Castellari	
Kickboxer	1989	David Worth	
Kid Blue	1973	James Frawley	
Kid Galahad	1962	Phil Karlson	
Kids	1995	Larry Clark	
Kids Return	1996	Takeshi Kitano	
Kiki's Delivery Service	1989	Hayao Miyazaki	
Kikujiro	1999	Takeshi Kitano	
Kill and Pray (also known as Requiescant)	1967	Carlo Lizzani	
Kill Bill: Volume 1	2003	Quentin Tarantino	
Kill Bill: Volume 2	2004	Quentin Tarantino	
Kill, Baby, Kill	1966	Mario Bava	
The Killer	1989	John Woo	
Killer Klowns from Outer Space	1988	Stephen Chiodo	
Killer Nun	1979	Giulio Berruti	
Killer of Sheep	1978	Charles Burnett	
Killers from Space	1954	W. Lee Wilder	
The Killing	1956	Stanley Kubrick	
The Killing of a Chinese Bookie	1976	John Cassavetes	
The Killing of Sister George	1968	Robert Aldrich	
Kimba the White Lion (also known as Jungle Emperor)	1966	Eiichi Yamamoto	
Kind Hearts and Coronets	1949	Robert Hamer	
The King	2005	James Marsh	
The King and I	1956	Walter Lang	
King Kong	1933	Merian C. Cooper and Ernest B. Schoedsack	
King Kong vs. Godzilla	1962	Ishirō Honda	
King Lear	1987	Jean-Luc Godard	
The King of Comedy	1982	Martin Scorsese	
King of Hearts	1966	Philippe de Broca	
King of New York	1990	Abel Ferrara	
King Solomon's Mines	1985	J. Lee Thompson	
The Kingdom	1994	Lars von Trier and Morten Arnfred	
Kingdom of the Spiders	1977	John Cardos	
Kings of the Road	1976	Wim Wenders	
Kings of the Sun	1963	J. Lee Thompson	
Kiss Kiss Bang Bang	2005	Shane Black	
Kiss Me Deadly	1955	Robert Aldrich	
Kiss of the Spider Woman	1985	Héctor Babenco	
Klute	1971	Alan J. Pakula	
Knightriders	1981	George A. Romero	
Koko-di Koko-da	2019	Johannes Nyholm	
Kolberg	1945	Veit Harlan	
Kontroll	2003	Nimród Antal	
Koyaanisqatsi	1982	Godfrey Reggio	
Krull	1983	Peter Yates	
Kung Fu Hustle	2004	Stephen Chow	
Kung Fu Master (also known as Le petit amour)	1988	Agnès Varda	
Kurutta yaju (also known as Crazed Beast and Savage Beast Goes Mad)	1976	Sadao Nakajima	
Kwaidan	1964	Masaki Kobayashi	
