= List of cult films: U =

This is a list of cult films organized alphabetically by name. See List of cult films for main list.

Film	Year	Director	Source
UHF	1989	Jay Levey	
Ulzana's Raid	1972	Robert Aldrich	
The Umbrellas of Cherbourg	1964	Jacques Demy	
The Unbelievable Truth	1989	Hal Hartley	
Unbreakable	2000	M. Night Shyamalan	
Uncertainty	2009	Scott McGehee and David Siegel	
Uncut Gems	2019	Josh Safdie, Benny Safdie	
Under the Rainbow	1981	Steve Rash	
Under the Volcano	1984	John Huston	
Under Two Flags	1936	Frank Lloyd	
The Undying Brain (also known as Brain of Blood)	1971	Al Adamson	
The Unearthly	1957	Boris Petroff	
The Unfaithful Wife	1969	Claude Chabrol	
Unico	1981	Toshio Hirata	
The Unknown	1927	Tod Browning	
Until the End of the World	1991	Wim Wenders	
Up!	1976	Russ Meyer	
Up in Smoke	1978	Lou Adler	
Urotsukidōji (also known as Legend of the Overfiend)	1989	Hideki Takayama	
The Usual Suspects	1995	Bryan Singer	
Uzumaki	2000	Higuchinsky	
