= List of cult films: X =

This is a list of cult films organized alphabetically by name. See List of cult films for main list.

Film	Year	Director	Source
X	2022	Ti West	
X: The Man with the X-ray Eyes	1963	Roger Corman	
Xanadu	1980	Robert Greenwald	
