= List of cult films: B =

This is a list of cult films organized alphabetically by name. See List of cult films for main list.

Film	Year	Director	Source
The Baby	1973	Ted Post	
Bachelor Party	1984	Neal Israel	
Back to the Future	1985	Robert Zemeckis	
The Bad and the Beautiful	1952	Vincente Minnelli	
Bad Boy Bubby	1994	Rolf de Heer	
Bad Day at Black Rock	1955	John Sturges	
Bad Santa	2003	Terry Zwigoff	
Bad Taste	1987	Peter Jackson	
Bad Timing	1980	Nicolas Roeg	
Badlands	1973	Terrence Malick	
Bagdad Cafe	1987	Percy Adlon	
Baise-moi	2000	Virginie Despentes and Coralie Trinh Thi	
Bambi	1942	David Hand	
Bananas	1971	Woody Allen	
Bande à part (Band of Outsiders)	1964	Jean-Luc Godard	
Bandit Queen	1994	Shekhar Kapur	
Bang the Drum Slowly	1973	John D. Hancock	
Barbarella	1968	Roger Vadim	
Barfly	1987	Barbet Schroeder	
The Barn of the Naked Dead (also known as Nightmare Circus and Terror Circus)	1973	Alan Rudolph	
Barry Lyndon	1975	Stanley Kubrick	
Barton Fink	1991	The Coen Brothers	
Basic Instinct	1992	Paul Verhoeven	
Basket Case	1982	Frank Henenlotter	
Batbabe: The Dark Nightie	2009	Zachary Snygg	
Batman	1966	Leslie H. Martinson	
Batman	1989	Tim Burton	
Batman & Robin	1997	Joel Schumacher	
Battle for Haditha	2007	Nick Broomfield	
The Battle of Algiers	1966	Gillo Pontecorvo	
The Battle of Brazil	1996	Jack Mathews	
The Battle of Britain	1943	Frank Capra	
The Battle of China	1944	Frank Capra	
The Battle of Russia	1943	Frank Capra	
Battle Royale	2000	Kinji Fukasaku	
Battlefield Earth	2000	Roger Christian	
Battles Without Honor and Humanity	1973	Kinji Fukasaku	
Battles Without Honor and Humanity: Deadly Fight in Hiroshima	1973	Kinji Fukasaku	
Battles Without Honor and Humanity: Final Episode	1974	Kinji Fukasaku	
Battles Without Honor and Humanity: Police Tactics	1974	Kinji Fukasaku	
Battles Without Honor and Humanity: Proxy War	1973	Kinji Fukasaku	
Battleship Potemkin	1925	Sergei Eisenstein	
Bay of Angels	1963	Jacques Demy	
Be Kind Rewind	2008	Michel Gondry	
Beach Party	1963	William Asher	
The Beast (also known as La Bête)	1975	Walerian Borowczyk	
The Beast from 20,000 Fathoms	1954	Eugène Lourié	
The Beast with Five Fingers	1946	Robert Florey	
The Beast Within	1982	Philippe Mora	
The Beat That My Heart Skipped	2005	Jacques Audiard	
Beat the Devil	1953	John Huston	
Beau Brummell	1954	Curtis Bernhardt	
Beau Geste	1926	Herbert Brenon	
Beau Geste	1939	William A. Wellman	
Beau Hunks	1931	James W. Horne	
Beau Travail	1999	Claire Denis	
Beauty and the Beast	1946	Jean Cocteau	
The Bed Sitting Room	1969	Richard Lester	
Bedazzled	1967	Stanley Donen	
Bedtime for Bonzo	1951	Frederick de Cordova	
Bee Season	2005	Scott McGehee and David Siegel	
Begotten	1989	E. Elias Merhige	
The Beguiled	1971	Don Siegel	
Behind the Green Door	1972	Artie Mitchell & Jim Mitchell	
Being John Malkovich	1999	Spike Jonze	
Being There	1979	Hal Ashby	
Bela Lugosi Meets a Brooklyn Gorilla	1952	William Beaudine	
The Believers	1987	John Schlesinger	
Bell, Book and Candle	1958	Richard Quine	
Belladonna of Sadness	1973	Eiichi Yamamoto	
Belle de Jour	1967	Luis Buñuel	
The Belles of St. Trinian's	1954	Frank Launder	
Ben	1972	Phil Karlson	
Ben-Hur	1959	William Wyler	
Benny's Video	1992	Michael Haneke	
Best in Show	2000	Christopher Guest	
The Best Man	1964	Franklin J. Schaffner	
The Best of Everything	1959	Jean Negulesco	
La Bête (also known as The Beast)	1975	Walerian Borowczyk	
La Bête Humaine (also known as The Human Beast and Judas Was a Woman)	1938	Jean Renoir	
Betsy's Wedding	1990	Alan Alda	
Better Off Dead	1985	Savage Steve Holland	
A Better Tomorrow	1986	John Woo	
Betty Blue	1986	Jean-Jacques Beineix	
Between Two Worlds (also known as Destiny)	1921	Fritz Lang	
The Beyond	1981	Lucio Fulci	
Beyond the Door	1974	Ovidio G. Assonitis	
Beyond the Time Barrier	1960	Edgar G. Ulmer	
Beyond the Valley of the Dolls	1970	Russ Meyer	
The Bible: In the Beginning...	1966	John Huston	
Bicycle Thieves	1948	Vittorio De Sica	
Big Bad Mama	1974	Roger Corman	
The Big Combo	1955	Joseph H. Lewis	
The Big Heat	1953	Fritz Lang	
The Big Knife	1955	Robert Aldrich	
The Big Lebowski	1998	The Coen Brothers	
The Big Racket	1976	Enzo G. Castellari	
The Big Silence (also known as The Great Silence)	1968	Sergio Corbucci	
The Big Sleep	1946	Howard Hawks	
Big Trouble in Little China	1986	John Carpenter	
Big Wednesday	1978	John Milius	
The Bigamist	1953	Ida Lupino	
Biggie & Tupac	2002	Nick Broomfield	
Bill & Ted's Bogus Journey	1991	Peter Hewitt	
Bill & Ted's Excellent Adventure	1989	Stephen Herek	
Billy Jack	1971	Tom Laughlin	
Billy the Kid Versus Dracula	1966	William Beaudine	
The Bird with the Crystal Plumage	1970	Dario Argento	
Birdman of Alcatraz	1962	John Frankenheimer	
The Birds	1963	Alfred Hitchcock	
The Bishop's Wife	1947	Henry Koster	
The Bitter Tears of Petra von Kant	1972	Rainer Werner Fassbinder	
Black	2005	Sanjay Leela Bhansali	
Black	2015	Adil El Arbi and Bilall Fallah	
Black Caesar	1973	Larry Cohen	
The Black Cat	1934	Edgar G. Ulmer	
Black Christmas	1974	Bob Clark	
Black Emanuelle	1975	Albert Thomas	
Black God, White Devil	1964	Glauber Rocha	
Black Mama White Mama	1973	Eddie Romero	
Black Moon	1975	Louis Malle	
Black Narcissus	1947	Michael Powell and Emeric Pressburger	
Black Sheep	2006	Jonathan King	
Black Sister's Revenge (also known as Emma Mae)	1976	Jamaa Fanaka	
Black Sunday	1960	Mario Bava	
Blackboard Jungle	1955	Richard Brooks	
Blackboards	2000	Samira Makhmalbaf	
Blacula	1972	William Crain	
Blade Runner	1982	Ridley Scott	
The Blair Witch Project	1999	Daniel Myrick and Eduardo Sánchez	
The Blancheville Monster	1963	Alberto de Martino	
The Blank Generation	1976	Ivan Kral and Amos Poe	
Blast of Silence	1961	Allen Baron	
Blast! (also known as The Final Comedown)	1972	Oscar Williams	
Blazing Saddles	1974	Mel Brooks	
Blessed Event	1932	Roy Del Ruth	
Blind Fury	1989	Phillip Noyce	
Blithe Spirit	1945	David Lean	
The Blob	1958	Irvin S. Yeaworth, Jr.	
Blonde Ice	1948	Jack Bernhard	
Blood (also known as O Sangue)	1989	Pedro Costa	
Blood Camp Thatcher (also known as Escape 2000 and Turkey Shoot)	1982	Brian Trenchard-Smith	
Blood Diamond	2006	Edward Zwick	
Blood Feast	1963	Herschell Gordon Lewis	
Blood from the Mummy's Tomb	1971	Seth Holt	
Blood Money	1933	Rowland Brown	
The Blood on Satan's Claw	1971	Piers Haggard	
Blood Orgy of the She-Devils	1973	Ted V. Mikels	
Blood Simple	1983	The Coen Brothers	
The Blood Spattered Bride	1972	Vicente Aranda	
Blood Sucking Freaks	1976	Joel M. Reed	
The Blood Sword of the 99th Virgin	1959	Morihei Magatani	
Bloody Mama	1970	Roger Corman	
Blow Job	1964	Andy Warhol	
Blow Out	1981	Brian De Palma	
Blowup	1966	Michelangelo Antonioni	
The Blue Kite	1993	Tian Zhuangzhuang	
The Blue Lamp	1950	Basil Dearden	
Blue Steel	1990	Kathryn Bigelow	
Blue Sunshine	1977	Jeff Lieberman	
Blue Velvet	1986	David Lynch	
Blueberry	2004	Jan Kounen	
The Blues Brothers	1980	John Landis	
Bob le flambeur	1956	Jean-Pierre Melville	
Body and Soul	1947	Robert Rossen	
Body Heat	1981	Lawrence Kasdan	
The Body Snatcher	1945	Robert Wise	
Body Snatchers	1993	Abel Ferrara	
The Bodyguard (also known as Karate Kiba and Bodyguard Kiba)	1973	Ryuichi Takamori	
Bolero	1984	John Derek	
Bolt	2008	Chris Williams and Byron Howard	
Bonnie and Clyde	1967	Arthur Penn	
The Boogey Man	1980	Ulli Lommel	
Boogie Nights	1997	Paul Thomas Anderson	
The Book of Life	1998	Hal Hartley	
Das Boot	1981	Wolfgang Petersen	
Borat	2006	Larry Charles	
Born in Flames	1983	Lizzie Borden	
Borsalino	1970	Jacques Deray	
Bottle Rocket	1996	Wes Anderson	
Le Boucher (also known as The Butcher)	1970	Claude Chabrol	
Bound	1996	The Wachowskis	
Bound for Glory	1975	Clément Perron	
À bout de souffle (also known as Breathless)	1960	Jean-Luc Godard	
Bowling for Columbine	2002	Michael Moore	
Boxing Helena	1993	Jennifer Chambers Lynch	
A Boy and His Dog	1975	L. Q. Jones	
The Boy Friend	1971	Ken Russell	
The Boy from Mercury	1996	Martin Duffy	
Boys Don't Cry	1999	Kimberly Peirce	
The Boys from Brazil	1978	Franklin J. Schaffner	
The Boys in the Band	1970	William Friedkin	
Boys in the Sand	1971	Wakefield Poole	
Boyz n the Hood	1991	John Singleton	
The Brain Eaters	1958	Bruno VeSota	
The Brain from Planet Arous	1957	Nathan H. Juran	
Brain of Blood (also known as The Undying Brain)	1971	Al Adamson	
The Brain That Wouldn't Die	1962	Joseph Green	
Braindead (also known as Dead Alive)	1992	Peter Jackson	
The Brainiac	1962	Chano Ureata	
Bram Stoker's Dracula	1992	Francis Ford Coppola	
Brand upon the Brain!	2006	Guy Maddin	
Branded to Kill	1967	Seijun Suzuki	
The Brave Little Toaster	1987	Jerry Rees	
Brazil	1985	Terry Gilliam	
The Breakfast Club	1985	John Hughes	
Breakin'	1984	Joel Silberg	
Breakin' 2: Electric Boogaloo	1984	Sam Firstenberg	
Breaking Away	1979	Peter Yates	
Breathless (also known as À bout de souffle)	1960	Jean-Luc Godard	
The Bribe	1949	Robert Z. Leonard	
Brick	2005	Rian Johnson	
The Bride (also known as The House That Cried Murder and Last House on Massacre Street)	1973	Jean-Marie Pélissié	
Bride of Frankenstein	1935	James Whale	
Bride of the Monster	1955	Ed Wood	
The Bride Wore Black	1968	François Truffaut	
Brides of Blood	1968	Eddie Romero and Gerardo de Leon	
Bridge to Terabithia	2007	Gábor Csupó	
Brief Encounter	1945	David Lean	
Bring Me the Head of Alfredo Garcia	1974	Sam Peckinpah	
Bringing Up Baby	1938	Howard Hawks	
Britannia Hospital	1982	Lindsay Anderson	
The Brood	1979	David Cronenberg	
Brother	1997	Aleksei Balabanov	
The Brother from Another Planet	1984	John Sayles	
Brothers of the Head	2005	Keith Fulton and Louis Pepe	
Bubba Ho-Tep	2002	Don Coscarelli	
Die Büchse der Pandora (also known as Pandora's Box)	1929	Georg Wilhelm Pabst	
A Bucket of Blood	1959	Roger Corman	
Bud Abbott and Lou Costello Meet Frankenstein (also called Abbott and Costello Meet Frankenstein)	1948	Charles Barton	
The Buddy Holly Story	1978	Steve Rash	
Buena Vista Social Club	1999	Wim Wenders	
Buffalo '66	1998	Vincent Gallo	
Buffy the Vampire Slayer	1992	Fran Rubel Kuzui	
Build My Gallows High (also known as Out of the Past)	1947	Jacques Tourneur	
A Bullet for the General	1966	Damiano Damiani	
The Bullet Train	1975	Junya Sato	
Bullitt	1968	Peter Yates	
Bunny Lake Is Missing	1965	Otto Preminger	
Burden of Dreams	1982	Les Blank	
Burlesque	2010	Steve Antin	
Burn!	1969	Gillo Pontecorvo	
Burnt by the Sun	1994	Nikita Mikhalkov	
But I'm A Cheerleader	1999	Jamie Babbit	
Butch Cassidy and the Sundance Kid	1969	George Roy Hill	
The Butcher (also known as Le Boucher)	1970	Claude Chabrol	
Butcher, Baker, Nightmare Maker	1981	William Asher	
