= List of cult films: 0–9 =

This is a list of cult films organized alphabetically by name. See List of cult films for main list.

Film	Year	Director	Source
The 4th Man (also known as The Fourth Man)	1983	Paul Verhoeven	
5 Card Stud	1968	Henry Hathaway	
7 Faces of Dr. Lao	1964	George Pal	
The 7th Voyage of Sinbad	1958	Nathan H. Juran	
8 Women	2002	François Ozon	
8½	1963	Federico Fellini	
9 Songs	2004	Michael Winterbottom	
9½ Weeks	1986	Adrian Lyne	
10	2002	Abbas Kiarostami	
The 10th Victim	1965	Elio Petri	
12 Angry Men	1957	Sidney Lumet	
12 Monkeys (also known as Twelve Monkeys)	1995	Terry Gilliam	
16 Years of Alcohol	2003	Richard Jobson	
23	1998	Hans-Christian Schmid	
24 Hour Party People	2002	Michael Winterbottom	
The 27th Day	1957	William Asher	
28 Days Later	2002	Danny Boyle	
The 36th Chamber of Shaolin	1978	Lau Kar-leung	
The 39 Steps	1935	Alfred Hitchcock	
The 40-Year-Old Virgin	2005	Judd Apatow	
42nd Street	1933	Lloyd Bacon	
47 Ronin (also known as Chūshingura: Hana no Maki, Yuki no Maki)	1962	Hiroshi Inagaki	
84C MoPic	1989	Patrick Sheane Duncan	
101 Reykjavik	2000	Baltasar Kormákur	
200 Motels	1971	Tony Palmer	
633 Squadron	1964	Walter Grauman	
2000 Maniacs (also known as Two Thousand Maniacs!)	1964	Herschell Gordon Lewis	
2001: A Space Odyssey	1968	Stanley Kubrick	
2046	2004	Wong Kar-wai	
The 5,000 Fingers of Dr. T.	1953	Roy Rowland	
