= List of cult films: V =

This is a list of cult films organized alphabetically by name. See List of cult films for main list.

Film	Year	Director	Source
V for Vendetta	2005	James McTeigue	
Valerie and Her Week of Wonders	1970	Jaromil Jireš	
Valley Girl	1983	Martha Coolidge	
Valley of the Dolls	1967	Mark Robson	
Vamp	1986	Richard Wenk	
The Vampire Lovers	1970	Roy Ward Baker	
Vampyr	1932	Carl Theodor Dreyer	
Vampyros Lesbos (also known as Las Vampiras)	1971	Jesús Franco	
Van Gogh	1991	Maurice Pialat	
The Vanishing	1988	George Sluizer	
Vanishing Point	1971	Richard C. Sarafian	
Vendredi soir (also known as Friday Night)	2002	Claire Denis	
Veerana	1988	Ramsay Brothers	
Velvet Goldmine	1998	Todd Haynes	
The Velvet Vampire (also known as Cemetery Girls)	1971	Stephanie Rothman	
Versus	2000	Ryuhei Kitamura	
Vertigo	1958	Alfred Hitchcock	
Videodrome	1983	David Cronenberg	
Villain	1971	Michael Tuchner	
Vincent	1982	Tim Burton	
Vinyl	1965	Andy Warhol	
Le Viol du Vampire (also known as The Rape of the Vampire)	1968	Jean Rollin	
Violent Cop	1989	Takeshi Kitano	
Violent Streets	1974	Hideo Gosha	
The Virgin Suicides	1999	Sofia Coppola	
Viridiana	1961	Luis Buñuel	
The Visitors (also known as Les Visiteurs)	1993	Jean-Marie Poiré	
Visitor Q	2001	Takashi Miike	
Viva	2007	Anna Biller	
Viva la Muerte	1971	Fernando Arrabal	
Viva Las Vegas	1964	George Sidney	
Viva Zapata!	1952	Elia Kazan	
Vivre sa vie	1962	Jean-Luc Godard	
Viy	1967	Konstantin Yershov and Georgi Kropachyov	
Voyage of the Rock Aliens	1984	James Fargo and Bob Giraldi	
