= List of cult films: G =

This is a list of cult films organized alphabetically by name. See List of cult films for main list.

Film	Year	Director	Source
Gabriel Over the White House	1933	Gregory La Cava	
Galaxy Quest	1999	Dean Parisot	
Gallivant	1997	Andrew Kötting	
The Game	1997	David Fincher	
Game of Death	1978	Bruce Lee	
Gamera: Guardian of the Universe	1995	Shusuke Kaneko	
Gamera 2: Attack of Legion	1996	Shusuke Kaneko	
Gamera 3: Revenge of Iris	1999	Shusuke Kaneko	
Gamera, the Giant Monster	1965	Noriaki Yuasa	
Games of Love and Chance	2003	Abdellatif Kechiche	
The Gamma People	1956	John Gilling	
The Gang's All Here	1943	Busby Berkeley	
Ganja & Hess	1973	Bill Gunn	
Gappa: The Triphibian Monster	1967	Haruyasu Noguchi	
The Garbage Pail Kids Movie	1987	Rod Amateau	
Garlic Is as Good as Ten Mothers	1980	Les Blank	
Gas-s-s-s	1970	Roger Corman	
Gaslight	1944	George Cukor	
The Gauntlet	1977	Clint Eastwood	
Gentlemen Prefer Blondes	1953	Howard Hawks	
George Lucas in Love	1999	Joe Nussbaum	
Gestapo's Last Orgy	1977	Cesare Canevari	
Get Carter	1971	Mike Hodges	
Get on the Bus	1996	Spike Lee	
Ghost	1990	Jerry Zucker	
The Ghost and Mrs. Muir	1947	Joseph L. Mankiewicz	
Ghost Dog: The Way of the Samurai	1999	Jim Jarmusch	
Ghost in the Shell	1995	Mamoru Oshii	
Ghost in the Shell 2: Innocence	2004	Mamoru Oshii	
The Ghost of Yotsuya	1959	Kenji Misumi	
Ghost World	2001	Terry Zwigoff	
Ghostbusters	1984	Ivan Reitman	
Ghosts	2006	Nick Broomfield	
Ghosts… of the Civil Dead	1988	John Hillcoat	
The Giant Claw	1957	Fred F. Sears	
The Giant Gila Monster	1959	Ray Kellogg	
Gigli	2003	Martin Brest	
Gimme Shelter	1970	Albert Maysles and David Maysles	
Ginger and Fred	1986	Federico Fellini	
Ginger Snaps	2000	John Fawcett	
Ginger Snaps 2: Unleashed	2004	Brett Sullivan	
Ginger Snaps Back: The Beginning	2004	Grant Harvey	
Girl Boss Guerilla	1972	Norifumi Suzuki	
The Girl Can't Help It	1956	Frank Tashlin	
Girl Gang	1954	Robert C. Dertano	
The Girl on a Motorcycle	1968	Jack Cardiff	
A Girl Walks Home Alone at Night	2014	Ana Lily Amirpour	
Girlfight	2000	Karyn Kusama	
The Glamorous Life of Sachiko Hanai	2003	Mitsuru Meike	
Glen or Glenda	1953	Ed Wood	
Glengarry Glen Ross	1992	James Foley	
The Glenn Miller Story	1954	Anthony Mann	
Gloria	1980	John Cassavetes	
Go	1999	Doug Liman	
Go Fish	1994	Rose Troche	
God Told Me To	1976	Larry Cohen	
The Godfather	1972	Francis Ford Coppola	
The Godfather Part II	1974	Francis Ford Coppola	
The Gods Must Be Crazy	1980	Jamie Uys	
Godzilla	1954	Ishirō Honda	
Godzilla 2000	1999	Takao Okawara	
Godzilla vs. Biollante	1989	Kazuki Ōmori	
Godzilla vs. Destoroyah	1995	Takao Okawara	
Godzilla vs. Gigan (also known as Godzilla on Monster Island)	1972	Jun Fukuda	
Godzilla, King of the Monsters!	1956	Terry O. Morse and Ishirō Honda	
Godzilla, Mothra and King Ghidorah: Giant Monsters All-Out Attack	2001	Shusuke Kaneko	
Goin' South	1978	Jack Nicholson	
Going Places	1974	Bertrand Blier	
Goke, Body Snatcher from Hell	1968	Hajime Sato	
The Gold Rush	1925	Charlie Chaplin	
Gold Diggers of 1933	1933	Mervyn LeRoy	
The Golden Compass	2007	Chris Weitz	
Goldfinger	1964	Guy Hamilton	
Golgo 13: Assignment Kowloon	1977	Yukio Noda	
Gomorrah	2008	Matteo Garrone	
Gone with the Wind	1939	Victor Fleming	
Gonks Go Beat	1964	Robert Hartford-Davis	
The Good Old Naughty Days	2002	Michel Reilhac	
Good Will Hunting	1997	Gus Van Sant	
The Good, the Bad and the Ugly	1966	Sergio Leone	
Goodbye, Columbus	1969	Larry Peerce	
Goodfellas	1990	Martin Scorsese	
The Goonies	1985	Richard Donner	
Gordon's War	1973	Ossie Davis	
The Gore Gore Girls	1972	Herschell Gordon Lewis	
Gorgo	1961	Eugène Lourié	
The Gospel According to St. Matthew	1964	Pier Paolo Pasolini	
Gothic	1986	Ken Russell	
La Grande Bouffe (also known as La Grande Abbuffata, The Grande Bouffe and Blow-Out)	1973	Marco Ferreri	
Grave of the Fireflies	1988	Isao Takahata	
Graveyard of Honor	1975	Kinji Fukasaku	
Grease	1978	Randal Kleiser	
Grease 2	1982	Patricia Birch	
The Great Dictator	1940	Charlie Chaplin	
The Great McGinty	1940	Preston Sturges	
The Great Rock 'n' Roll Swindle	1979	Julien Temple	
The Great Silence (also known as The Big Silence)	1968	Sergio Corbucci	
The Great Texas Dynamite Chase	1976	Michael Pressman	
Greed	1924	Erich von Stroheim	
Greed in Broad Daylight (also known as High Noon for Gangsters)	1961	Kinji Fukasaku	
The Green Elephant	1999	Svetlana Baskova	
The Green Slime	1968	Kinji Fukasaku	
Greetings	1968	Brian De Palma	
Gremlins 2: The New Batch	1990	Joe Dante	
Grey Gardens	1976	Albert and David Maysles	
The Grifters	1990	Stephen Frears	
Grim Prairie Tales	1990	Wayne Coe	
Grindhouse	2007	Robert Rodriguez and Quentin Tarantino	
Grisbi (also known as Honour Among Thieves and Touchez pas au grisbi)	1954	Jacques Becker	
The Grissom Gang	1971	Robert Aldrich	
Grizzly Man	2005	Werner Herzog	
Groove	2000	Greg Harrison	
Groundhog Day	1993	Harold Ramis	
The Grudge	2004	Takashi Shimizu	
Guinea Pig: Mermaid in a Manhole	1988	Hideshi Hino	
Gummo	1997	Harmony Korine	
Gun Crazy	1950	Joseph Lewis	
A Gun for Jennifer	1997	Todd Morris	
Gunda	1998	Kanti Shah	
