= Love Mates =

1961 film

- Directed by: Lars-Magnus Lindgren
- Starring: Jarl Kulle; Christina Schollin
- Release date: 30 January 1961
- Running time: 1h 48min
- Country: Sweden
- Language: Swedish

Love Mates (Swedish: Änglar, finns dom?), also known as Do You Believe in Angels?, is a 1961 Swedish comedy film directed by Lars-Magnus Lindgren.

== Cast ==
- Jarl Kulle - Jan Froman
- Christina Schollin - Margareta Günther
- Edvin Adolphson - Viktor Günther
- Isa Quensel - Louise Günther
- Sigge Fürst - Bert Hagson
- Elsa Carlsson - The Aunt
- Gunnar Sjöberg - Karl-Evert Raeder
- George Fant - Rolf Granér
- Margit Carlqvist - Veronica von Sachs
- Åke Claesson - Torsten Waller
- Torsten Lilliecrona - Stenman, staff manager
- Börje Mellvig - Westin
