= List of cult films: I =

This is a list of cult films organized alphabetically by name. See List of cult films for main list.

Film	Year	Director	Source
I Am a Fugitive from a Chain Gang	1932	Mervyn LeRoy	
I Bury the Living	1958	Albert Band	
I Don't Want to Be Born	1975	Peter Sasdy	
I Drink Your Blood	1970	David E. Durston	
I Eat Your Skin	1971	Del Tenney	
I Know Where I'm Going!	1945	Michael Powell and Emeric Pressburger	
I Married a Monster from Outer Space	1958	Gene Fowler	
I Married a Witch	1942	René Clair	
I Saw What You Did	1965	William Castle	
I Spit on Your Grave (also known as Day of the Woman)	1978	Meir Zarchi	
I Walked with a Zombie	1943	Jacques Tourneur	
I Was a Male War Bride	1949	Howard Hawks	
I Was a Teenage Werewolf	1957	Gene Fowler	
I Was Born, But...	1932	Yasujirō Ozu	
I Will Walk Like a Crazy Horse	1973	Fernando Arrabal	
I'll Cry Tomorrow	1955	Daniel Mann	
I'll Never Forget What's'isname	1967	Michael Winner	
I'm Gonna Git You Sucka	1988	Keenan Ivory Wayans	
I'm Not There	2007	Todd Haynes	
Ice Station Zebra	1968	John Sturges	
Ichi the Killer	2001	Takashi Miike	
Idiocracy	2006	Mike Judge	
The Idiot	1951	Akira Kurosawa	
Idiot Box	1996	David Caesar	
The Idiots	1998	Lars von Trier	
Les idoles	1968	Marc'O	
if....	1968	Lindsay Anderson	
Ilsa, She Wolf of the SS	1974	Don Edmonds	
Imitation of Life	1959	Douglas Sirk	
The Immoral Mr. Teas	1959	Russ Meyer	
In a Lonely Place	1950	Nicholas Ray	
In Bruges	2008	Martin McDonagh	
In Cold Blood	1967	Richard Brooks	
In the Company of Men	1997	Neil LaBute	
In the Dark	2004	Marc Cinquanta	
In the Mood for Love	2000	Wong Kar-wai	
In the Realm of the Senses	1976	Nagisa Ōshima	
Inauguration of the Pleasure Dome	1954	Kenneth Anger	
The Incredible 2-Headed Transplant	1971	Anthony M. Lanza	
The Incredible Melting Man	1977	William Sachs	
The Incredible Shrinking Man	1957	Jack Arnold	
The Incredibles	2004	Brad Bird	
The Incredibly Strange Creatures Who Stopped Living and Became Mixed-Up Zombies	1963	Ray Dennis Steckler	
The Incredibly True Adventure of Two Girls in Love	1995	Maria Maggenti	
Indiana Jones and the Last Crusade	1989	Steven Spielberg	
Indiana Jones and the Temple of Doom	1984	Steven Spielberg	
Infernal Affairs	2002	Andrew Lau and Alan Mak	
L'Inferno (also known as Dante's Inferno)	1911	Francesco Bertolini, Adolfo Padovan, Giuseppe De Liguoro	
Inferno	1980	Dario Argento	
The Inglorious Bastards	1978	Enzo G. Castellari	
Inglourious Basterds	2009	Quentin Tarantino	
Inland Empire	2006	David Lynch	
Innerspace	1987	Joe Dante	
Inserts	1975	John Byrum	
Insomnia	1997	Erik Skjoldbjærg	
An Inspector Calls	1982	Michael Simpson	
Intermezzo	1936	Gustaf Molander	
Interstella 5555: The 5tory of the 5ecret 5tar 5ystem	2003	Kazuhisa Takenouchi	
Intolerable Cruelty	2003	Joel Coen	
Intolerance	1916	D. W. Griffith	
Invaders from Mars	1953	William Cameron Menzies	
The Invasion	2007	Oliver Hirschbiegel	
Invasion of Astro-Monster	1965	Ishirō Honda	
Invasion of the Body Snatchers	1956	Don Siegel	
Invasion of the Body Snatchers	1978	Philip Kaufman	
Invasion of the Saucer Men	1957	Edward L. Cahn	
Invocation of My Demon Brother	1969	Kenneth Anger	
The Iron Giant	1999	Brad Bird	
The Iron Horse	1924	John Ford	
Iron Man	2008	Jon Favreau	
Ironweed	1987	Héctor Babenco	
Irréversible	2002	Gaspar Noé	
Is Anybody There?	2008	John Crowley	
Ishtar	1987	Elaine May	
The Island of Dr. Moreau	1977	Don Taylor	
Island of Lost Souls	1932	Erle C. Kenton	
Island of Terror	1966	Terence Fisher	
The Isle	2000	Kim Ki-duk	
It	1927	Clarence G. Badger	
It Always Rains on Sunday	1947	Robert Hamer	
It Came from Beneath the Sea	1955	Robert Gordon	
It Conquered the World	1956	Roger Corman	
It Happened One Night	1934	Frank Capra	
It Lives Again (also known as It's Alive II)	1978	Larry Cohen	
It! The Terror from Beyond Space	1958	Edward L. Cahn	
It's a Gift	1934	Norman McLeod	
It's a Mad, Mad, Mad, Mad World	1963	Stanley Kramer	
It's a Wonderful Life	1946	Frank Capra	
It's Alive	1974	Larry Cohen	
The Italian Job	1969	Peter Collinson	
Ivan the Terrible, Part I	1944	Sergei Eisenstein	
Ivan the Terrible, part II: The Boyars' Plot	1958	Sergei Eisenstein	
Ivan's Childhood	1962	Andrei Tarkovsky	
Ivul	2009	Andrew Kötting	
