= List of cult films: R =

This is a list of cult films organized alphabetically by name. See List of cult films for main list.

Film	Year	Director	Source
Raakh	1989	Aditya Bhattacharya	
Rabid	1977	David Cronenberg	
Rabbit's Moon	1950	Kenneth Anger	
Race with the Devil	1975	Jack Starrett	
Rachel Getting Married	2008	Jonathan Demme	
Radio On	1979	Christopher Petit	
Raging Bull	1980	Martin Scorsese	
Raiders of the Lost Ark	1981	Steven Spielberg	
The Railway Children	1970	Lionel Jeffries	
The Rain People	1969	Francis Ford Coppola	
The Rainbow Thief	1990	Alejandro Jodorowsky	
Ram Gopal Varma Ki Aag (or simply Aag)	2007	Ram Gopal Varma	
Rambo: First Blood Part II	1985	George P. Cosmatos	
Ran	1985	Akira Kurosawa	
The Rapacious Jailbreaker (also known as Escaped Murderer from Hiroshima Prison)	1974	Sadao Nakajima	
The Rape of the Vampire (also known as Le Viol du Vampire)	1968	Jean Rollin	
The Rapture	1991	Michael Tolkin	
Rashomon	1950	Akira Kurosawa	
Raw Meat (also known as Death Line)	1972	Gary Sherman	
Razorback	1984	Russell Mulcahy	
Re-Animator	1985	Stuart Gordon	
Re-Entry	1964	Jordan Belson	
Rear Window	1954	Alfred Hitchcock	
Rebel Without a Cause	1955	Nicholas Ray	
Red Dawn	1984	John Milius	
Red Dust	1932	Victor Fleming	
The Red Shoes	1948	Michael Powell and Emeric Pressburger	
Reefer Madness (also known as Tell Your Children)	1936	Louis J. Gasnier	
Reefer Madness: The Movie Musical	2005	Andy Fickman	
La Reine Margot (also known as Queen Margot)	1994	Patrice Chéreau	
Rembrandt	1936	Alexander Korda	
Remember My Name	1978	Alan Rudolph	
Rendez-vous	1985	André Téchiné	
Renaissance	2006	Christian Volckman	
Repo Man	1984	Alex Cox	
The Reptile	1966	John Gilling	
Repulsion	1965	Roman Polanski	
Requiem for a Dream	2000	Darren Aronofsky	
Requiescant (also known as Kill and Pray)	1967	Carlo Lizzani	
Reservoir Dogs	1992	Quentin Tarantino	
Resident Evil	2002	Paul W. S. Anderson	
El Retorno de Walpurgis (also known as The Return of Walpurgis and Curse of the Devil)	1973	Carlos Aured	
The Return	2003	Andrey Zvyagintsev	
Return of Daimajin	1966	Kenji Misumi	
The Return of the Living Dead	1985	Dan O'Bannon	
The Revenge of Frankenstein	1958	Terence Fisher	
Rhymes for Young Ghouls	2013	Jeff Barnaby	
Ride Lonesome	1959	Budd Boetticher	
Ride the High Country	1962	Sam Peckinpah	
Ride in the Whirlwind	1966	Monte Hellman	
Rififi	1955	Jules Dassin	
Ring	1998	Hideo Nakata	
The Ring	2002	Gore Verbinski	
Ring 2	1999	Hideo Nakata	
Rio Bravo	1959	Howard Hawks	
Rita of the West (also known as Crazy Westerners)	1967	Ferdinando Baldi	
The Road	2009	John Hillcoat	
Road to Perdition	2002	Sam Mendes	
The Road Warrior (also known as Mad Max 2)	1981	George Miller	
Road House	1989	Rowdy Herrington	
Roar	1981	Noel Marshall	
Roaring Fire	1981	Norifumi Suzuki	
Robinson Crusoe	1954	Luis Buñuel	
Robinson Crusoe on Mars	1964	Byron Haskin	
RoboCop	1987	Paul Verhoeven	
Robot Monster	1953	Phil Tucker	
Rock 'n' Roll High School	1979	Allan Arkush	
Rock Around the Clock	1956	Fred F. Sears	
Rock, Rock, Rock!	1956	Will Price	
The Rocketeer	1991	Joe Johnston	
The Rocky Horror Picture Show	1975	Jim Sharman	
Roller Boogie	1979	Mark L. Lester	
Rollerball	1975	Norman Jewison	
Rolling Family	2004	Pablo Trapero	
Roman Holiday	1953	William Wyler	
Le Roman d'un tricheur (also known as Confessions of a Cheat and The Story of a Cheat)	1936	Sacha Guitry	
Romance	1999	Catherine Breillat	
Romance & Cigarettes	2005	John Turturro	
Rome, Armed to the Teeth (also known as The Tough Ones)	1976	Umberto Lenzi	
Rome, Open City	1945	Roberto Rossellini	
Romper Stomper	1992	Geoffrey Wright	
Romy and Michele's High School Reunion	1997	David Mirkin	
Ronin	1998	John Frankenheimer	
The Room	2003	Tommy Wiseau	
Rope	1948	Alfred Hitchcock	
Rose Hobart	1936	Joseph Cornell	
Rosemary's Baby	1968	Roman Polanski	
Rosetta	1999	Dardenne brothers	
Roxie Hart	1942	William A. Wellman	
The Royal Hunt of the Sun	1969	Irving Lerner	
The Royal Tenenbaums	2001	Wes Anderson	
Rumble Fish	1983	Francis Ford Coppola	
Run Lola Run (Lola Rennt)	1998	Tom Tykwer	
Run of the Arrow	1957	Samuel Fuller	
Rushmore	1998	Wes Anderson	
