= East Side Story (1997 film) =

- Directed by: Dana Ranga
- Produced by: Dana Ranga and Andrew Horn
- Release date: 1997
- Running time: 75 min.
- Country: Germany
- Languages: English, Russian

East Side Story is a 1997 documentary directed by Dana Ranga. The film documents the Soviet Bloc musical genre, which first appeared under Stalin and spread to Soviet-occupied Eastern Europe. The film features interviews with actors, film historians, and audience members who reminisce on these unlikely films and their impact on Soviet Bloc life.

== Synopsis ==
The film first looks at Grigori Alexandrov, a director who made his career in the 1930s musicals. He directed the unlikely hit Jolly Fellows (1934), which had the backing of Maxim Gorky and the personal approval of Stalin. Alexandrov went on to create other propagandistic musicals, including Volga, Volga (1938), which details the story of peasants who boat to Moscow on the River Volga to become singers. These musicals starred his wife, Lyubov Orlova.

Next, the film examines other East European musical films, concentrating on the films of East Germany's DEFA studio, including the wildly successful My Wife Wants to Sing (1958), Midnight Revue (1962), Beloved White Mouse (1964), and Hot Summer (1968).

Many of the films were quite popular, but relatively few were made because their themes did not fit comfortably with the canons of Socialist realism.

== Awards and nominations ==
East Side Story was nominated for the Cultural Film award at Marseille Festival of Documentary Film in 1998.
