= Dana Ranga =

Romanian writer and film director (born 1964)

Dana Ranga (born 1964 in Bucharest) is a Romanian writer and film director, currently living and working in Berlin.

== Life ==
Dana Ranga was born in 1964 in Bucharest. Initially, she studied medicine at the Carol Davila University of Medicine and Pharmacy. After she left for Berlin, she studied journalism, art history and film theory at the Free University Berlin. She now works in Berlin as a filmmaker, author and poet. Her debut production East Side Story (1997) received an award at the Marseille Festival of Documentary Film in 1998. The documentary film Story (2003), about astronaut Story Musgrave received awards at the film festivals in Marseille (2003), Leipzig (2003) and Houston (2004). Afterwards, Dana Ranga produced the documentary Cosmonaut Polyakov (2007), part two of the space trilogy. This film won the international feature-length competition at the It's All True / É Tudo Verdade documentary film festival in São Paulo, Brazil and the first prize at the Ciencia e Cinema festival in A Coruña, Spain, both in 2008. The space trilogy was completed in 2012 with "I Am in Space", an essay about psychology and space flight, featuring videos filmed by French ESA astronaut Jean-François Clervoy.

== Filmography ==
- 1997: East Side Story (director, script)
- 2003: Story (director, script)
- 2007: Cosmonaut Polyakov (director, script, cut)
- 2009: Oh, Adam (director, script, cut)
- 2012: I Am in Space (director, script, cut)

== Awards ==
- 2014: Adelbert von Chamisso Prize
- 2012: Graz resident writer
