= Dark Soldier D =

1998 film

Dark Soldier D is a 1998 mecha tokusatsu film created by Buildup Co. (later renamed Buildup Entertainment) and distributed by Bandai. The film is actually made up of three short acts serving as a kind of television format. The series was unique as it didn't follow any type of manga, anime, or tokusatsu archetype. Instead, it served as an antithesis for those motifs. However, the series does pay some homage to the Super Robot genre. Furthermore, the series story is targeted more towards adults rather than children; in addition, the overall story is depicted as being "mean-spirited".

== Plot ==
Kawamata is a psychotic soldier who fell in with the Russian Special Operation Forces. It was at this time that Kawamata became the guinea pig for this secret scientific research organization. The Russians wanted to ensure that they were ahead of the U.S. in the arms race, and used this organization to develop a mobile combat suit, armed to the teeth with all kinds of weapons imaginable. During his tenure on the project, Kawamata met Matsuzaki, a twisted scientist who was kicked out of Japan for unscrupulous practices. Matsuzaki became lead engineer on the combat suit project and coded Kawamata's thought impulses into the control mechanism, so only he can operate the walking arsenal. But when Communist Russia collapsed, Kawamata and Matsuzaki stole the armored battle suit and snuck it into Japan.

=== Acts ===
- Act I

Kawamata, a former special forces, who becomes a mercenary for hire. In this part of the story we explore the mind of Kawamata, a wealthy man and an avid collector of military weapons. The monster in Act I is called the Dad Monster, according to Buildup. This monster is a businessman who was infected by the parasite ooze when he got too close to the meteor. He slowly began to turn into a monster; first brutally killing his wife and daughter…then feasting on both them.. Finally, he fully developed into the Dad Monster and goes on a killing spree; shredding people and biting victims in half. Kawamata heard of the monster and was excited to finally test his newly upgraded combat suit. After a couple of minutes of mindless destruction, Kawamata comes out triumphant against the Dad Monster by ripping him to shreds with his trusty machine gun…however…he kills 40+ innocent bystanders in the process.

- Act II

A year has passed since Kawamata single handedly vanquished the Dad Monster and killed many innocent bystanders in the process. Although he destroyed the monster, Kawamata was sentenced to death for the massacre in Shinjuku, however, the charges against him would be dropped if he cooperated with the government and used the combat suit to fight the meteor monsters, he reluctantly agrees. While in prison, he befriended a fellow inmate named Iba; it seemed that many of the prisoners feared Kawamata or hated him., but Iba didn't fear him because he loved weapons as much as Kawamata did. When a meteor crashes in the suburbs, the parasite ooze infects a chicken which began to eat livestock and the farmer before it ran into the city. The creature starts attacking an amusement park and Kawamata is quickly dispatched to intercept the monster. During the fight, Kawamata loses a leg and an arm; struggling, he barely managed to fight back and defeat the monster.

- Act III

Sergei and his commandos arrived in Japan to kill Kawamata for stealing one of Russia's combat suits. Meanwhile, Kawamata's limbs were replaced by the government. In addition, he began to feel sick and tired of fighting for the government and chose Iba as his successor to the combat suit. Sergei arrived at Kawamata's home and successfully killed him despite Iba's attempts to protect his mentor. Suddenly, another meteor appeared and was secured by Sergei's commandoes, but in a freak accident, the meteor thawed from its confinement and the ooze infected Sergei turning him into the Combat Suit Monster and went on a rampage and ate the other commandos. Now it was up to Iba to fight this beast. The end of the movie ended in a cliffhanger, where Kawamata's brain is preserved for study; further denying him any peace even after death.

== Characters ==
- Kawamata - A mercenary, always ready for battle, but when the Cold War ended, he had to wait until it was time for combat once more. Before the Cold War ended, he stole a combat suit from the USSR and escaped to Japan. He is eventually killed by Sergei and his unit near the end of the movie.
- Matsuzaki - He is Kawamata's sidekick, so to speak. Originally, an engineer who developed the designs for the combat suit. When he and Kawamata escaped to Japan, he upgraded the combat suit to Type D status, which is far stronger than the "Type C" combat suits the Russians had. He was somewhat of a mad scientist. He and Kawamata are not friends who share a shaky business relationship.
- Tanaka - A government agent who was assigned to lead a special task force against the meteor monsters.
- Iba - He was Kawamata's cellmate in prison and successor to the Type D combat suit. He was appointed to succeed Kawamata as combat suit pilot by Kawamata himself.
- Yuriko - A woman who was saved from the Yakuza by Kawamata and now aggressively follows him.
- Sergei - The commander of the Russian Combat Suit Force who utterly despises Kawamata and comes to Japan to kill him for stealing one of the combat suits. He's far more psychotic and dangerous than Kawamata himself.

== Combat Suit "Type D" ==
=== Background ===
The Combat Suit was originally developed by the Russian Special Forces and acts sort of like a mobile tank. It was created due to Russia and America's arms race during the Cold War. When the Soviet Union collapsed, the project was rendered obsolete. During its manufacturing, Russia was only able to get their Combat Suit line up to "Type C" status. Kawamata and Matsuzaki steals one of the Russian "Type C" Combat Suits after the collapse and escape to Japan. There, it was given modifications and upgrades including the latest control devices, gun tracks, and turbine engines. In addition, the suit was programmed to be piloted by Kawamata only and served as a fail safe should anyone else attempt to take it.

=== Statistics ===
- Height: 6.8 feet
- Weight: 375 lbs.

=== Armament ===
- MM-1 Grenade Launcher
- AK-47 "Customized Kawamata Special"
- M-82A1 Anti-Materiel Rifle
- M-60 GPMG
- AT-4 Rocket Launcher

== Meteor Monsters ==
Meteor Monsters are alien parasites that are concealed within mysterious meteors that crash to Earth. They start as amoeba-like living ooze. When it attaches itself to another living organism, it completely takes over its host and begins to devour anything around it causing it to grow into enormous size.

- "Dad" Monster – The meteor monster featured in Act I. He was originally a stressed-out businessman that witnesses a meteor crash. While investigating the crash site, an amoeba emerges from the meteor and attaches to him. When returning home to his nagging wife, he goes insane and murders her. Afterwards, he devours her and later his own daughter. Now with the urge to consume, he begins to grow and later attacks the city to feed. It is armed with powerful fangs and tusks as well as claws.
- Chicken Monster – The meteor monster featured in Act II. The monster came to be when a meteor crashed by a nearby farm where the amoeba then attached itself to a chicken. As a result, it began attacking and devouring the other livestock and eventually attacked and ate the farmer. The monster then ran off into the city where it attacked an amusement park. It is armed with a powerful beak which can even penetrate the Combat Suit's armor.
- Combat Suit Monster – The meteor monster featured in Act III. Kawamata's nemesis, Sergei, becomes this monster after an accident which thawed a captured amoeba that was in possession of Sergei's unit. After it escapes, it bonds with Sergei driving him mad resulting in Sergei devouring his own unit. Iba, Kawamata's successor, is sent to combat the newly born monster before it goes out of control. It is armed with an extending mandible and covered with Combat Suit armor.
