= Lars-Magnus Lindgren =

Swedish film director and screenwriter (1922–2004)

- Born: 3 July 1922; Västerås, Sweden
- Died: 23 November 2004 (aged 82); Nacka, Sweden
- Occupation: Film director
- Relatives: Peter Lindgren (brother)

Lars-Magnus Lindgren (3 July 1922 – 23 November 2004) was a Swedish film director and screenwriter. His film Dear John (1964) was nominated for the Academy Award for Best Foreign Language Film. His other works include Black Palm Trees (Svarta palmkronor), a 1968 film, based on the 1944 novel by Peder Sjögren.

== Selected filmography ==
- A Dreamer's Journey (1957)
- Hide and Seek (1963)
