= Bianca Leigh =

American actress

- Born: New Jersey
- Education: Rutgers University (BFA)
- Occupation: Actress

Bianca Leigh is an American actress. She appeared as Mary Ellen in the 2005 film Transamerica, and Karma Johnstone in the 2016 film Hurricane Bianca and the sequel Hurricane Bianca: From Russia with Hate. On Broadway, she appeared as a stand-in for the 2018 play The Nap by Richard Bean. In 2011, she performed her one-woman show Busted at the Laurie Beechman Theatre. She performed in Taylor Mac's The Lily's Revenge, and has also performed with The Talking Band Theatre Company. Leigh appeared in the Laverne Cox documentary Disclosure: Trans Lives on Screen. From July 2024 to August 2025, she performed the role of Louise in the Cole Escola play Oh, Mary! on Broadway, having previously played the part in the show's off-Broadway run. From April 28 to June 20, 2026, she rejoined the Broadway company.

Leigh earned a Bachelor of Fine Arts in acting from Rutgers University's Mason Gross School of Arts in 1984.

Leigh is a transgender woman.
