= Machine Dazzle =

American costume designer, drag performer

- Born: Matthew Flower; 1972 (age 53–54); Upper Darby Township, Pennsylvania, U.S.
- Education: University of Colorado, Boulder
- Occupation: Costume designer
- Years active: 2001–present
- Parents: James Flower (father); Deborah Flower (mother)

Machine Dazzle (born 1972) is the stage name of Matthew Flower, an American costume designer, set designer, performance artist and drag queen known for his excessive and fantastical camp, surrealist, queer and maximalist approach.

== Early life ==
Machine Dazzle was born Matthew Flower, in 1972 in Upper Darby Township, Pennsylvania. The middle child of three sons, he was mostly raised by his mother Deborah, while his father James was away working as an engineer on oil tankers. The family moved to Houston, Texas and then eventually to Idaho Falls, where Flower felt alienated amongst the predominantly Mormon community. “I was always the tallest and the gayest” Machine Dazzle told Hilton Als when speaking about this period of his life for a piece in The New Yorker.

Flower cites seeing the 1980 Olivia Newton-John film Xanadu at the age of 8 as a defining moment that helped shape his view of himself. At the age of 19, he came out as gay to his conservative parents.

Flower attended and graduated from the University of Colorado, Boulder, earning a degree in art. In 1994 he moved to New York City and joined the Dazzle Dancers. He spent this time working a myriad of day jobs, including a position as a jewelry designer and at the non-profit cultural center Exit Art, to support his growing fascination with designing extravagant costumes to wear at night in New York City's clubs such as CBGB and Jackie 60.

The origin of the name Machine Dazzle came from dancing in costume at one such club as a Dazzle Dancer. A friend referred to him as a dancing machine, which quickly morphed into Machine Dazzle. Eventually he began taking commissions from drag queens and dancers. Julie Atlas Muz asked him to design a full show in 2004. In 2008, he designed the sets and costumes for Lustre, a Midwinter Trans-Fest, starring Justin Vivian Bond. In 2009, he designed Taylor Mac's five hour long The Lily's Revenge.

== Career ==
Flower is known for utilizing novelty items or found objects such as ping pong balls, slinkies, soup cans, and rubber hotdogs into his costume work.

He was a co-recipient the 2017 Bessie Award for Outstanding Visual Design and the winner of a 2017 Henry Hewes Design Award.

In 2016, Taylor Mac's A 24-Decade History of Popular Music, which Flower heavily collaborated on, was a finalist for the Pulitzer Prize in Drama.

In 2022, the Museum of Art and Design in New York opened the first solo exhibition of his work, Queer Maximalism x Machine Dazzle. The show occupied two full floors of the museum and positioned full costumes, ephemera, material samples, photography, and video to fully contextualize the artist's body of work.

In 2024, the University of Michigan Museum of Art (UMMA) presented his Ouroboros in collaboration with the U of M Stamps School of Art and Design after he was awarded the recipient of the Design Roman J. Witt Residency Program. Ouroboros is a queer maximalist art exhibit made with the help of community members from locally sourced recycled materials. Ouroboros was introduced during UMMA's Pride Month and morphs as the installation progresses in three acts, culminating in its final act as "wearable sculptures" during 2024's LGBTQ Pride Month. Flower performed at the Ann Arbor Michigan Theater on March 14, 2024 to talk about maximalism in addition to his exhibit installation.

== Works ==
=== Plays ===
Works with costume and/or stage designs by Machine Dazzle

- I Am The Moon and You Are The Man On Me (2004) by Julie Atlas Muz
- House Of No More (2006) by Big Art Group
- Lustre (2008) by Justin Vivian Bond
- The Lily's Revenge (2009) by Taylor Mac
- Re:Galli Blonde (2011) by Justin Vivian Bond
- Walk Across America For Mother Earth (2012) by Taylor Mac
- Football Head (2014) by Chris Tanner
- Change (2015) by Soomi Kim
- I Promised Myself To Live Faster (2015) by Pig Iron Theater
- Bombay Ricky (2016) by Prototype Festival
- A 24-Decade History of Popular Music (2016) by Taylor Mac
- Dito and Aeneus (2017) by Opera Philadelphia
- Opium (2018) by Spiegelworld
- Holiday Sauce…Pandemic! (2020) by Taylor Mac
