= Breaking character =

Common theatre phrase meaning to stop acting

In theatre (especially in the illusionistic Western tradition) and film, breaking character occurs when an actor fails to maintain the illusion that they are the character they are supposedly portraying. This is considered unprofessional while performing in front of an audience or camera (except when the act is a deliberate breaking of the fourth wall). British English uses a slang term, corpsing, to specifically describe one of the most common ways of breaking character—when an actor loses their composure and laughs or giggles inappropriately during a scene. (Note: Attributed to multiple sources:) The British slang term is derived from an actor laughing when their character is supposed to be a corpse. From the American critical perspective, the British slang term can also carry a deeper secondary meaning: by breaking character, the actor has pulled the audience out of the dramatic work and back to reality, effectively killed the character they are attempting to portray, and figuratively turned the character into a corpse. Thus, corpsing is "the worst thing" that an actor can do on stage. An actor's breaking character often results in an abandonment of a take in recorded or filmed drama.

== Famous breaks in film ==
The advent of DVD players, with the use of their precise pause and slow-motion functions, has made it far easier to spot breaks in character in motion pictures, and many internet sites collect such examples.

Example:

- Catherine Schell, who found it difficult to act with Peter Sellers in The Return of the Pink Panther and maintain her composure. Several scenes showing her laughing at his antics remain in the film.

== On television ==
Examples of actors breaking character on television include:

- Lucille Ball, in a rare example of her breaking character, was forced to do so during the filming of "Lucy and Viv Put in a Shower", a season 1 episode of The Lucy Show. In the climactic scene, the titular shower filled with water due to a drain malfunction, and Ball nearly drowned attempting to unplug it. Co-star Vivian Vance hastily reworked the script to allow Ball to recover her composure. Ball's near-drowning was included in the finished episode, which was one of several from the series to lapse into the public domain.
- Many instances of breaking character have occurred on Saturday Night Live, where showrunner Lorne Michaels is known to strongly discourage character breaks:
  - Christina Applegate and David Spade could not stop laughing at Chris Farley's motivational speaker character, Matt Foley.
  - The band members in the "More Cowbell" sketch broke character reacting to Will Ferrell's antics. Jimmy Fallon often broke character, which became one of his trademarks.
  - Perhaps the most severe example of an entire cast breaking is the first appearance of the Debbie Downer character, where in a 2004 skit featuring Rachel Dratch, guest host Lindsay Lohan and others, Dratch eventually struggles to exclaim to exaggerated effect "By the way ... I can't have children!"
  - While playing NewsNation host Bobbi Moore in an April 13, 2024, SNL skit, Heidi Gardner, who has built a reputation for maintaining composure during comedy scenes, drew considerable attention for corpsing in what Vulture magazine characterized "in spectacularly charming fashion". (Note: Attributed to multiple sources:)
- In the Doctor Who episode "The Feast of Steven", actor William Hartnell breaks character to wish the audience a merry Christmas, with actors Peter Purves and Jean Marsh also breaking character, erupting in laughter. The Christmas address was scripted, but the laughter was not. (Note: As The Feast of Steven was a one-off filler episode, and now only survives as a home-made audio recording, it's possible that the episode contains other instances of actors visually breaking character.)
- On The Daily Show, Jon Stewart or one of the correspondents occasionally broke character during a segment. One example was a piece on an allegation of a homosexual relationship involving the then Prince Charles and the British tabloids' shameless use of innuendo and euphemisms to spread the rumor while avoiding libelous statements. The segment had Stephen Colbert "reporting" from Britain and explaining, in terms laden with homoerotic imagery, that it would be journalistically irresponsible to go into detail about the story. He then peeled a banana and took a huge bite of it in imitation of fellatio, causing himself to smile and Stewart to begin giggling off screen. By the end of the segment, Colbert was laughing so hard he could barely speak.
- Tim Conway took great pleasure in pushing his The Carol Burnett Show co-stars to lose composure and break out in helpless laughter – in particular, Harvey Korman, in their Dentist Sketch as well as many others. Vicki Lawrence, as Mama in one of their many "The Family" sketches, scored a rare turnabout on Conway (as Mickey, Ed's (Korman) hardware-store employee), who had reduced Carol Burnett and Dick Van Dyke to fits of laughter in the Siamese Elephant Sketch. After Conway's repeated interruptions during the sketch, making a bizarre story incrementally even more so, the cast attempted to resume the sketch – prompting Lawrence to break the fourth wall and ask Eunice (Burnett) "You sure that little asshole's through?" which brought down the cast and studio audience as well. The scene was cut and is recognized as one of the best-known "blooper" outtakes in TV history. Years later, when asked about the scene, Lawrence replied that the scene may have been an outtake, but was not a blooper. She never fully elaborated afterward.

== Virtual and gaming environments ==
Breaking character or corpsing is also being used more frequently to describe a participant-player who, having assumed the role of a virtual character or avatar and is acting within a virtual or gaming environment, then breaks out of that character. For example, this could be a player-character behaving inappropriately within the social-cultural environment depicted by the virtual or gaming environment or the participant-player ceasing to interact-play (momentarily or entirely) leaving the character suspended and/or lifeless.

== See also ==
- Fourth wall
- Out of character communication in the sociological theory of dramaturgy
