= Hurricane Bianca: From Russia with Hate =

- Theatrical release poster
- Directed by: Matt Kugelman
- Written by: Derek Hartley
- Story by: Matt Kugelman
- Produced by: Ash Christian; Jonathan Yaskoff
- Starring: Roy Haylock; Rachel Dratch; Brian "Katya" McCook; Molly Ryman; D.J. "Shangela" Pierce; Doug Plaut; Alicia Goranson; Cheyenne Jackson; Kristen Johnston; Dot-Marie Jones; Heather McDonald; Janeane Garofalo; Wanda Sykes
- Cinematography: Jih-E Peng
- Edited by: Scott D. Martin
- Music by: Mark Vogel
- Production companies: KugieFilm; Cranium Entertainment
- Distributed by: Wolfe Releasing
- Release date: May 18, 2018 (United States)
- Running time: 85 minutes
- Country: United States
- Language: English

Hurricane Bianca: From Russia with Hate is a 2018 American comedy film directed by Matt Kugelman. It was released on May 18, 2018. A sequel to the 2016 film Hurricane Bianca, the film's plot centres on Bianca Del Rio (Roy Haylock) being driven to Russia by Debbie's (Rachel Dratch) campaign for revenge against her after being released from prison.

The film's title is a reference to the James Bond film From Russia with Love (1963).

== Plot ==
Deborah Ward has just been released from prison and immediately plans to get her revenge on Richard Martinez, also known as Bianca Del Rio. Deborah tricks Richard into going to Russia in hopes of getting him arrested. But when Deborah's daughter, Carly, and Richard's slightly mentally ill friend Rex are arrested and sent to a gulag, Deborah and Richard must put their differences aside and rescue their loved ones.

== Cast ==
- Roy Haylock as Richard Martinez/Bianca Del Rio
- Rachel Dratch as Deborah Ward
- Brian McCook as Dimitri/"Mitya"/Katya
- Molly Ryman as Carly Ward
- D.J. "Shangela" Pierce as Stephen
- Doug Plaut as Rex
- Alicia Goranson as Angela Jo
- Cheyenne Jackson as Boris
- Kristen Johnston as Roksana
- Dot-Marie Jones as Svetlana
- Heather McDonald as Beverly Ann
- Janeane Garofalo as Magda
- Wanda Sykes as Prison Matron
- Alaska Thunderfuck as herself (cameo)
- Alyssa Edwards as Ambrosia Salad
- Mrs. Kasha Davis as Vicki Leaks
- Darienne Lake as Gorky Park
- Bianca Leigh as Karma Johnstone

== Reception ==
Roger Moore of Movie Nation gave the film a 1.5 out of 4 stars, describing it as "a rude, crude, cameo-happy sequel to “Hurricane Bianca,” with the same crazy eye makeup and the same stars as the first daft dirty dog of a gay rights goof."

== Sequel ==
As of November 2026, a third film titled Hurricane Bianca: The Roots of All Evil is still in development and will include Dratch and several Drag Race performers in its cast. On December 20, 2022; the film title was announced as Hurricane Bianca: The Roots of All Evil. Del Rio stated in an interview that the film would be set in Africa. Principal photography is scheduled to begin in March 2023 in Mobile, Alabama. The film is yet to have a release date.
