= Shangela =

American drag queen (born 1981)

Shangela Laquifa Wadley
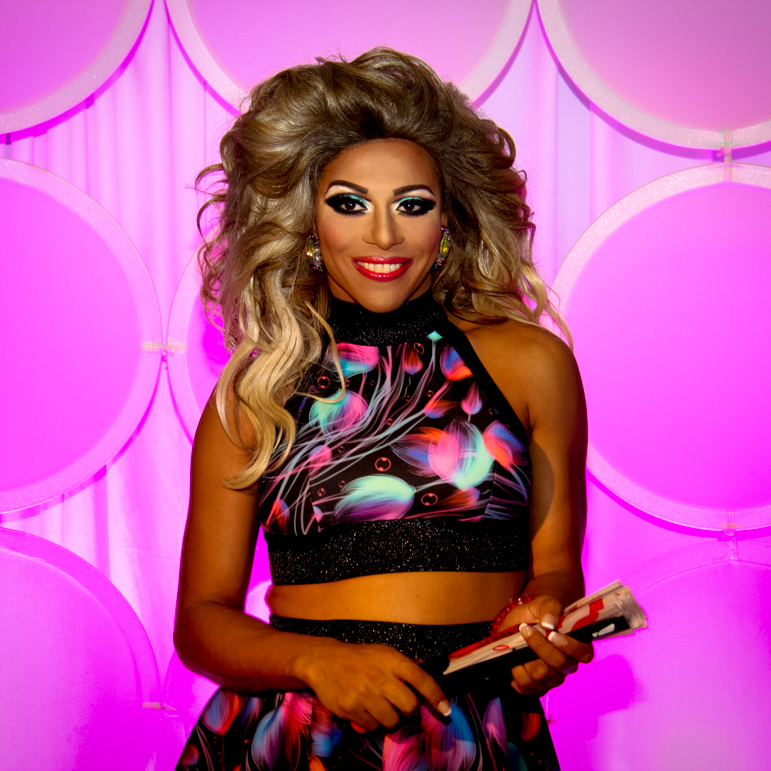
- Shangela at RuPaul's DragCon NYC, 2017
- Born: Chantaize Darius Jeremy Pierce; November 22, 1981 (age 44); Lamar County, Texas, U.S.
- Other name: D.J. Pierce
- Education: Southern Methodist University (BA)
- Occupations: Drag queen; television personality; actor
- Known for: RuPaul's Drag Race (season 2); RuPaul's Drag Race (season 3); RuPaul's Drag Race All Stars (season 3); Dancing With The Stars (season 31)

Chantaize Darius Jeremy Pierce, better known by the stage name Shangela Laquifa Wadley or simply as Shangela (born November 22, 1981), is an American drag queen, reality television personality, TV producer, and actor best known for competing on RuPaul's Drag Race. Shangela was the first contestant eliminated in season two, and returned as a surprise contestant in the series' third season, placing sixth. He returned once again for the third season of RuPaul's Drag Race All Stars where he finished in joint-third/fourth place alongside winner of the first season, BeBe Zahara Benet. Shangela has also made several television appearances and regularly performs across the United States and Canada.

After Drag Race, Shangela appeared in numerous television series, including Community (2011), 2 Broke Girls (2012), Glee (2012), Bones (2014), The X-Files (2016), and Broad City (2019). He also appeared in the comedy film Hurricane Bianca (2016), its sequel Hurricane Bianca: From Russia with Hate (2018), and the musical drama film A Star is Born (2018). In 2019, representing A Star Is Born at the 91st Academy Awards, he became the first drag queen to walk the Oscars red carpet in drag. Between 2020 and 2024, Shangela co-hosted the HBO reality series We're Here, alongside fellow Drag Race contestants Bob the Drag Queen and Eureka O'Hara. The series received acclaim from critics.

== Early life ==
Chantaize Darius Jeremy Pierce was born on November 22, 1981, in Lamar County, Texas, and grew up in nearby Paris, Texas. He is the only child of Debra Sue Pierce (born 1959). His mother worked for the United States Army and traveled frequently for her job.

Pierce is biracial and of half-Saudi descent. His parents separated when he was very young, after which his father returned to Saudi Arabia. Pierce was subsequently raised by his mother and her large Southern Baptist family.

His grandfather worked as a cowboy on a cattle ranch and became the father figure in his life following his parents' separation. His grandfather died in 2000.

While attending high school, Pierce was a cheerleader and first experimented with drag by dressing in drag for creative English class projects. He later attended Southern Methodist University, where he earned a Bachelor of Arts degree.

== Career ==
=== Early career ===
Pierce developed the drag persona Shangela in January 2009. Pierce later recalled that he adopted the name "Shangela" after a friend spoke with a woman named Shangela while making a telemarketing call.

Shangela first performed publicly after Pierce choreographed a three-person drag performance to "Single Ladies" for a sober charity event in Los Angeles. When one of the performers withdrew shortly before the event, the remaining performers persuaded Pierce to take the vacant role. The performance impressed the club's promoter, who invited Shangela to return the following week. Pierce later described the booking as the beginning of his drag career.

Shangela's drag mother is fellow drag performer Alyssa Edwards.

In 2010, Shangela won the inaugural California Entertainer of the Year pageant, with Chad Michaels named first alternate.

=== RuPaul's Drag Race ===
After five months of performing in Los Angeles, Shangela was selected to join the cast for season two of RuPaul's Drag Race, but was eliminated in the first episode. She later reauditioned and was invited back for season three, where she made it to the top five (although she placed sixth overall due to the return of Carmen Carrera one episode later). She also made cameo appearances in the show's fourth-season premiere and the "Snatch Game" episode of All Stars season two.

Shangela returned to compete on the third season of RuPaul's Drag Race: All Stars, making her the first queen to compete on three separate seasons of the show. She made it to the season's finale and was considered a frontrunner for the crown, but was controversially eliminated after only receiving one vote from Thorgy Thor among the jury of previously eliminated queens. She subsequently tied third/fourth place with season-one winner Bebe Zahara Benet.

Shangela competed in the television special RuPaul's Drag Race Holi-slay Spectacular. In June 2019, a panel of judges from New York magazine placed Shangela second on their list of "the most powerful drag queens in America", a ranking of 100 former RuPaul's Drag Race contestants.

=== We're Here ===
Since 2020, Shangela has co-hosted We're Here on HBO alongside fellow Drag Race contestants Bob the Drag Queen and Eureka O'Hara. In the series, the trio of drag queens travel across the United States to recruit small-town residents to participate in one-night-only drag shows. After premiering on April 23, 2020, the series was renewed for a second season, which premiered on October 11, 2021. In December 2021, the series was renewed for a third season. The series has received acclaim from critics. The series was renewed for a fourth season, but with a cast of new queens (Priyanka, Jaida Essence Hall, and Sasha Velour) replacing Eureka, Bob, and Shangela.

=== Dancing with the Stars ===
In September 2022, Pierce was announced as a contestant on the thirty-first season of Dancing with the Stars, where he was partnered with professional dancer Gleb Savchenko. The pair advanced to the finale, receiving three perfect scores from the judges and winning a dance relay challenge before finishing in fourth place.

=== Other television and film appearances ===
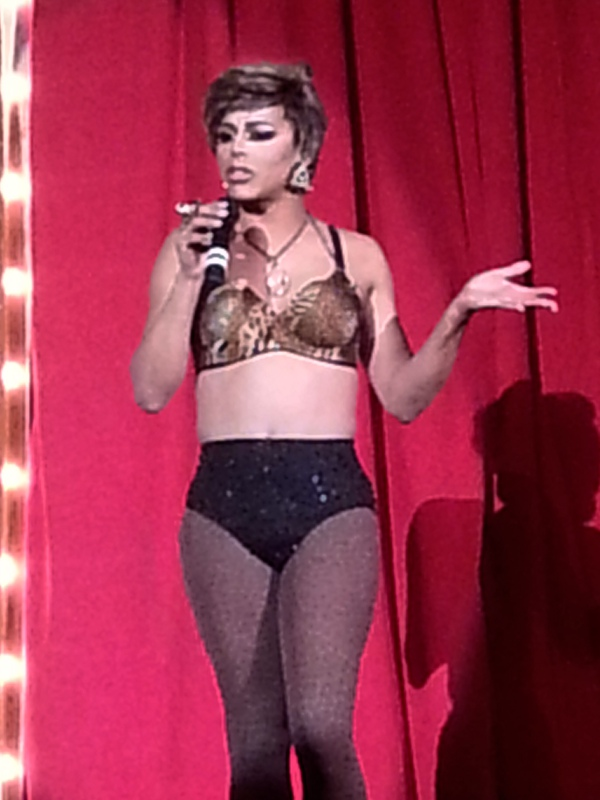
Pierce performing a stand-up act as Laquifa at the Castro Theatre in 2014

Shangela appeared in Toddlers & Tiaras, in which she coached her 9-year-old goddaughter to compete in a beauty pageant. Other appearances include episodes of Glee, Bones, Community, Terriers, Dance Moms, 2 Broke Girls, Detroit 187 and The Mentalist, as well as a commercial for Orbitz with fellow Drag Race contestants Manila Luzon and Carmen Carrera. Shangela and other RuPaul's Drag race contestants including Trixie Mattel, Tammie Brown, and Manila Luzon, appeared in a Food and Drug Administration campaign against smoking.

Pierce had a non-drag role in a short film, Body of a Barbie (2011), which aired on BET and was a Top 7 National Finalist on the network's Lens on Talent series. In 2013, Shangela was featured in an ad for Facebook Home.

She was one of thirty drag queens featured in Miley Cyrus's 2015 VMA performance.

Shangela had a role in the 2016 comedy film Hurricane Bianca, directed by Matt Kugelman and starring fellow Drag Race contestants Bianca Del Rio and Willam Belli. She returned to reprise this role in the 2018 sequel, Hurricane Bianca: From Russia with Hate.

In 2018, she was the commentator for the U.S. for the Eurovision Song Contest held in Lisbon, Portugal with Ross Mathews for Logo TV. The same year, she had a supporting role as a drag queen emcee in the film A Star Is Born, alongside Lady Gaga, Bradley Cooper, and Willam Belli.

=== Music and video ===
On August 23, 2011, she released her first single "Call Me Laquifa". Her second single, "Werqin' Girl", was released on August 7, 2012. The music video for "Werqin' Girl" features appearances by Abby Lee Miller, Jenifer Lewis, and Yara Sofia. On March 15, 2018, the day of the All Stars 3 finale, Shangela released a new single titled "Pay Me" which features producer Ryan Skyy.

In 2013, Shangela appeared in the music video "Gone With the Wind Fabulous" by Kenya Moore. In 2018, Shangela featured on both the vocals and in the music video for Doll Hairs, a single released by Todrick Hall as part of his Forbidden visual album.

On August 14, 2013, Shangela, along with fellow drag queens Detox, Morgan McMichaels, Courtney Act, Willam Belli, and Raven, were featured in the lyric video for Lady Gaga's single "Applause".

In 2019, singer Ariana Grande featured Shangela's voice on the song "NASA" from her fifth studio album Thank U, Next.

=== Other ventures ===
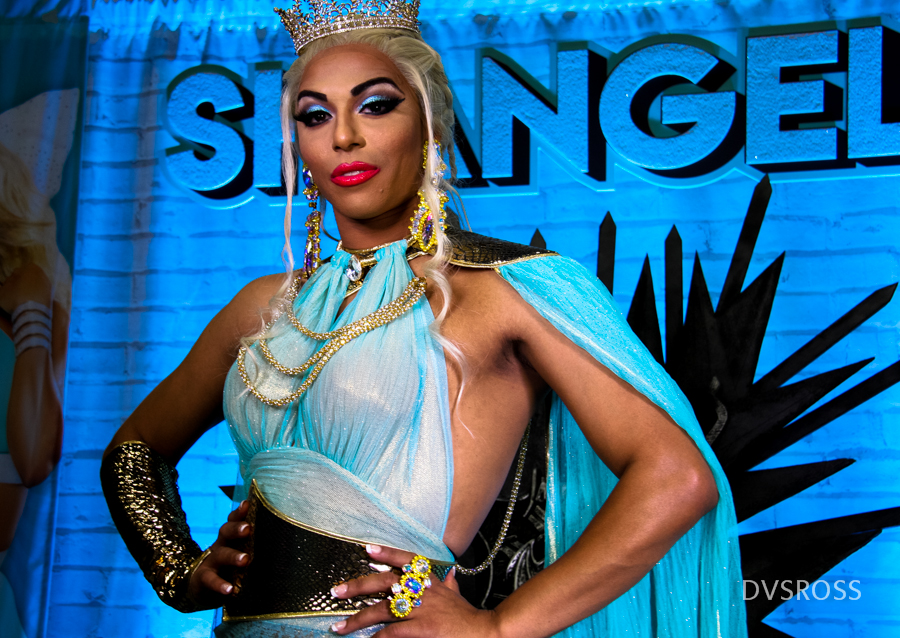
Shangela in 2018

Shangela is known for the catchphrase, "Halleloo", which the Los Angeles Times considered one of the "2010 Top Terms We Learned on Reality Television". Shangela's comedic persona is Laquifa, who entered the limelight during the eighth episode of season three, in which he won the "Ru Ha Ha" competition. Since being on Drag Race, Shangela has performed comedy as Laquifa in Downelink.com's "One Night Stand Up!" on LOGO. Shangela has performed in the Drag Queens of Comedy showcase alongside legends Lady Bunny, Jackie Beat and Coco Peru, as well as the Werq the World tour alongside several fellow Drag Race alumni, of which she is also the creative director.

Since appearing on Drag Race, Shangela launched "Say What Entertainment", a talent and management agency, in 2014.

Shangela was featured as one of OUT Magazine's "Most Compelling People of 2011".

== Public advocacy ==
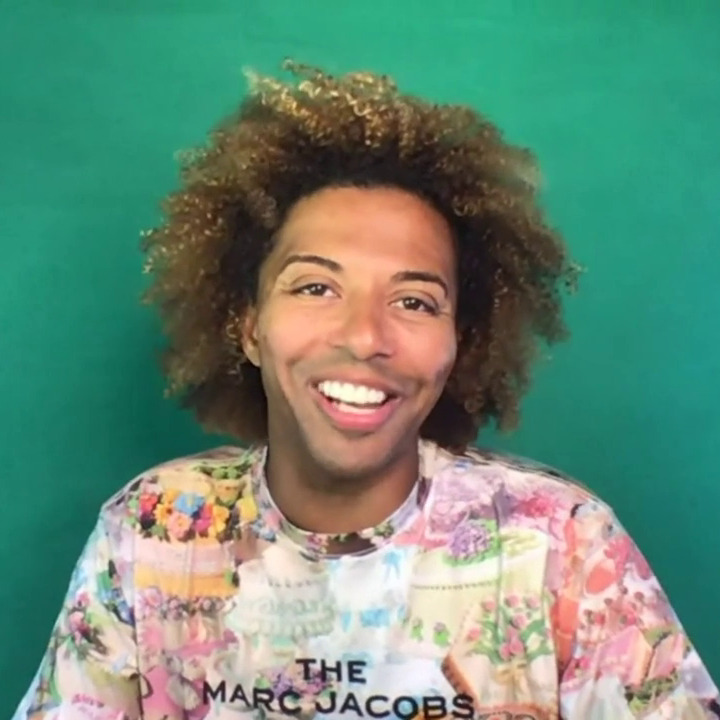
Pierce in 2020

Pierce has supported HIV/AIDS awareness and charitable initiatives throughout his career. In 2011, he appeared in Gilead Sciences' "Red Ribbon Runway" campaign alongside fellow RuPaul's Drag Race contestants Carmen Carrera, Delta Work, Manila Luzon, and Alexis Mateo. The dress he wore in the campaign was later auctioned by Logo in recognition of World AIDS Day, with proceeds benefiting the National Association of People with AIDS.

Pierce also participated in public health campaigns. In 2016, he joined fellow Drag Race contestants in the U.S. Food and Drug Administration's "This Free Life" anti-smoking campaign, which promoted tobacco-free lifestyles among LGBTQ young adults.

In June 2020, during the COVID-19 pandemic, Pierce partnered with the Actors Fund of America to launch Feed the Queens, a charitable initiative that provided meals to drag performers whose livelihoods had been disrupted by pandemic-related shutdowns.

== Personal life ==
Pierce is gay, and is of mixed African-American and Saudi Arabian descent. He has lived in the basement of Jenifer Lewis' poolhouse for over a decade in Los Angeles, California.

=== Rape allegations ===
On May 3, 2023, Pierce was accused of rape in a lawsuit filed in Los Angeles Superior Court. Former We're Here production assistant Daniel McGarrigle accused Pierce of supplying him with alcohol and assaulting him. Pierce denies the allegations in the lawsuit. Co-defendant Buckingham Television released a statement saying that they had conducted an investigation and concluded there was not sufficient evidence to support the allegations.

During mediation on January 16, 2024, McGarrigle dropped the lawsuit against Pierce; the parties reached a settlement in February.

On March 18, 2024, a Rolling Stone article was published that detailed five more alleged cases of sexual assault, spanning from 2012 to 2018. In February 2025, Pierce had another civil lawsuit filed against him by Eric Poff, a production assistant on Hurricane Bianca: From Russia with Hate, claiming that Pierce and another unnamed defendant had drugged and raped Poff while working on the film in Manhattan, New York in October 2017. That case is still pending as of February 2026.

== Filmography ==
=== Film ===
Year	Title	Role	Notes
2009	The Panty Man	Young Poet	Short film
2012	LaQuifa is HALLELOOSIN' It!	Herself	Stand-up film
2013	Farah Goes Bang	Bettina	
2013	R.I.P.D.	Drag Queen Avatar	Uncredited
2013	Cinderoncé	The Fairy Dragmother	Short film
2015	TupiniQueens	Drag Queen	Documentary
2015	This Is Drag	Herself	Documentary
2015	Kiss Me, Kill Me	Jasmine	
2016	Dragged	Herself	Documentary
2016	Hurricane Bianca	Stephen	
2018	Hurricane Bianca: From Russia with Hate	Stephen	
2018	A Star Is Born	Drag Bar Emcee	

=== Television ===
Year	Title	Role	Notes	Ref
2010	Terriers	Mikaela	Episode: "Pimp Daddy"	
2010	One Night Stand Up	Herself / Host	Episode: "Downelink.com's One Night Stand Up"	
2010–2011	RuPaul's Drag Race: Untucked	Herself	11 episodes	
2010–2012	RuPaul's Drag Race	Herself	Contestant: Season 2 – 12th Place; Contestant: Season 3 – 6th Place; Guest Star: Season 4 (Episode "RuPocalypse Now!")	
2011	Spring/Fall	Dion	Unsold pilot	
2011	A Mann's World	Snip	Unsold pilot	
2011	Detroit 1-8-7	Drag Performer	Episode: "Legacy/Drag City"	
2011	The Soup Awards	Herself	Television special	
2011	Community	Miss Urbana Champaign	Episode: "Advanced Gay"	
2011–2015	Dance Moms	Herself	3 episodes	
2012	The Soup	Herself	3 episodes	
2012	The Mentalist	Herself	Episode: "Ruby Slippers"	
2012	L.A. Hair	Herself	Episode: "The Big Blow Out"	
2012	2 Broke Girls	Hallelujah	Episode: "And the Hold-Up"	
2012	Glee	Drag Queen	Episode: "Thanksgiving"	
2012–2013	Toddlers & Tiaras	Herself / Guest Mentor	36 episodes	
2013	The Bold and the Beautiful	Steve Caplan	Episode: "#1.6693"	
2014	Hello Ross	Correspondent / Panelist	2 episodes	
2014	Bones	Kimmy Moore	Episode: "The Drama in the Queen"	
2015	Lavalantula	Neils Elman	Television film	
2016	Watch What Happens Live with Andy Cohen	Herself	Talk show	
2016	The X-Files	Annabelle	Episode: "Mulder and Scully Meet the Were-Monster"	
2016–2018	RuPaul's Drag Race: All Stars	Herself	Guest Star: Season 2 (Episode "All Stars Snatch Game"); Contestant: Season 3 – 3rd/4th Place	
2018	Eurovision Song Contest 2018	Herself	Commentator for the United States	
2018	Dancing Queen	Herself	3 episodes	
2018	Super Drags	Donizete / Scarlet (voice)	5 episodes	
2018	How May We Hate You?	Trivia Announcer	Unsold pilot	
2018	RuPaul's Drag Race Holi-slay Spectacular	Herself	Contestant – Winner	
2019	Broad City	Waitress	Episode: "Lost and Found"	
2020	Katy Keene	Devereaux	3 episodes	
2020	Lovecraft Country	Drag Queen	Episode: "Strange Case"	
2020	12 Dates of Christmas	Herself	Host	
2020	Station 19	Ruby Red Slippers	Episode: "We Are Family"	
2020–2022	We're Here	Herself	Season 1-3 (20 episodes)	
2021	The Tonight Show with Jimmy Fallon	Herself	Guest	
2022	Good Morning America	Herself	Guest	
2022	Dancing with the Stars	Herself	Contestant: Season 31 – 4th Place	
2022	A Black Lady Sketch Show	Arms Dealer	Episode: "It's a New Day, Africa America!"	
2023	Little Demon	Queen Inichoochiama	Episode: "Everybody's Dying for the Weekend"	

=== Music videos ===
Year	Title	Artist	Ref.
2009	"Beat It"	Fall Out Boy ft. John Mayer	
2013	"Applause" (Lyric video)	Lady Gaga	
2013	"Woman's World" (Remix)	Cher	
2013	"Gone With The Wind Fabulous"	Kenya Moore	
2016	"Man Candy"	Herself	

=== Web series ===
Year	Title	Role	Notes	Ref
2012	Jennifer Lewis and Shangela	Herself	Produced by Lewis and The Collaboration Factory	
2014	Girlfriend Intervention Recap	Herself	Produced by World of Wonder	
2017	Squad Wars	Herself	Youtube Red original	
2019	Werq the World	Herself	Produced by World of Wonder	

== Discography ==
=== Singles ===
Title	Year	Peak chart positions			Album
Title	Year	US Dance	UK Sales	SCOT	Album
"Call Me Laquifa"	2011	—	—	—	Non-album singles
"Werqin' Girl (Professional)"	2012	—	—	—	Non-album singles
"Uptown Fish"	2015	—	—	—	Non-album singles
"Deck A Ho (Mitch Ferrino Mix)" (Bob the Drag Queen feat. Shangela)	2017	—	—	—	Non-album singles
"Pay Me"	2018	—	—	—	Non-album singles
"Kitty Girl" (RuPaul feat. BeBe Zahara Benet, Kennedy Davenport, Shangela & Trixie Mattel)	2018	18	44	33	Non-album singles
"—" denotes a recording that did not chart or was not released in that territory.

=== Guest appearances ===
Title	Year	Other artist(s)	Album
"Doll Hairs"	2018	Todrick Hall	Forbidden
"Fabulous French" (uncredited vocal)	2018	Bradley Cooper, Lady Gaga, Anthony Ramos	A Star Is Born
"NASA" (uncredited vocal)	2019	Ariana Grande	Thank U, Next

== Awards and nominations ==
Year	Award giving body	Category	Work	Results	Ref
2018	WOWIE Awards	Best Red Carpet Look	Herself	Won	
2019	Queerty Awards	Drag Royalty	Herself	Won	
2019	Shorty Awards	Best LGBTQ+ Account	Herself	Won	
2021	Queerty Awards	Innovator	Herself	Won	
2023	Peabody Award	Entertainment	We're Here	Won	
