= Hurricane Bianca =

- Theatrical release poster
- Directed by: Matt Kugelman
- Screenplay by: Matt Kugelman
- Produced by: Ash Christian; Jonathan Yaskoff
- Starring: Roy Haylock; Rachel Dratch; Lola Botha; Grayson Thorne Kilpatrick; Willam Belli; D.J. "Shangela" Pierce; Markus Kelle; Alan Cumming; RuPaul; Margaret Cho; Misti Morley
- Cinematography: Austin F. Schmidt
- Edited by: Scott Martin
- Music by: Mark Vogel
- Production company: Cranium Entertainment
- Distributed by: Wolfe Video
- Release dates: September 23, 2016 (VOD); October 18, 2016 (DVD)
- Running time: 84 minutes
- Country: United States
- Language: English
- Budget: $166,889 (Note: The total and most accurate budget is currently unknown. Source depicts the highest figure found online via the crowdfunding website for Hurricane Bianca.)

Hurricane Bianca is a 2016 American comedy film directed and written by Matt Kugelman. The film's title derives from the main character, Bianca Del Rio (Roy Haylock), an American costumer and drag queen, best known for winning the sixth season of RuPaul's Drag Race.

== Plot ==
A school teacher named Richard moves from New York City to a small town in Texas, and begins work at a new school. Shortly after this, Richard gets outed by the community in this town and is consequently fired. Following this, Richard feels the need to get revenge on the people that were hateful to him, so he returns as Bianca Del Rio, his drag persona, and spreads his hate and causes mayhem to those that were mean to him, who are oblivious to the fact that Del Rio is actually the previously fired Richard.

== Cast ==
- Bianca Del Rio as Richard Martinez/Bianca Del Rio
- Rachel Dratch as Deborah Ward, vice principal at Milford High School
- Bianca Leigh as Karma Johnstone, a trans woman and radio personality who Richard befriends in Texas
- Denton Blane Everett as Coach Chuck, gym teacher and football coach at Milford High and Karma's brother
- Willam Belli as Bailey, one of Richard's best friends from New York
- Shangela Laquifa Wadley as Stephen, one of Richard's best friends from New York
- Misti Morley as Janice, the janitor at Milford High
- Téa Mckay as Keeley Carson, a student at Milford High
- Kaleb King as Bobby, a gay student at Milford High
- Molly Ryman as Carly Ward, a teacher at Milford High and Deborah's daughter
- Ted Ferguson as Principal Wayne
- Alan Cumming as Lawrence Taylor, president of the teaching ambassador program that sends Richard to Milford High
- Joslyn Fox as the barmaid
- Alyssa Edwards as Ambrosia Salad
- RuPaul as RuStorm, a weather reporter

== Production ==
Before winning RuPaul's Drag Race, Del Rio had already garnered attention as a comedian and drag queen in the New York City and New Orleans drag scenes. She would often host and MC events, including Mardi Gras and Southern Decadence. Del Rio became friends with Kugelman, who wrote the film specifically based on him, stating "Tall, slender and glamorous, but with the mouth of a truck driver, I immediately thought that Bianca was a total movie character, and that this would be the story that I develop for my first feature." The film was introduced and announced years before Del Rio's rise to fame on RuPaul's Drag Race.

After the two had decided to pursue the venture, a crowdfunding site was set up on Indiegogo and was sponsored also by Fractured Atlas. The film's budget was met largely through extensive crowdfunding. Del Rio began promoting the project during her shows, encouraging fans to donate to the project. Other methods of funding included Del Rio making personalised videos to contributors, in a video series titled "Bianca Hates You". As Del Rio is an insult comic by trait, those who donated high amounts of money received these videos, as a lot of fans enjoyed being verbally attacked by Del Rio.

Speaking on the film before its release, Del Rio stated: "It's a serious topic, but it's done in a funny way." Kugelman stated he hopes the film will shine a light on employment discrimination in the United States, saying "My hope is that Hurricane Bianca will change minds and bring awareness to the issue. The film deals with a serious topic in a comedic way."

=== Casting ===
Kugelman and Del Rio enlisted various known names for the movie following Del Rio's appearance on RuPaul's Drag Race. Actor and Drag Race season 4 contestant Willam Belli was first announced to be joining the cast via a YouTube video, playing Del Rio's on-screen best friend Bailey. Other Drag Race contestants announced to be cast via Del Rio's social media were fellow season 6 cast member Joslyn Fox, season 3 cast member Shangela Laquifa Wadley and season 5 cast member Alyssa Edwards.

Outside of Drag Race, both Alan Cumming and Rachel Dratch were both announced via social media to be in the film.

=== Filming ===
According to Del Rio's website, filming took place over a three-week period in mid July and August in Garland, Texas at Garland High School. Behind the scenes footage posted on social media from some of the actors showed a scene at a roller rink (Texas Skatium in Garland) and a school. After filming had commenced, Kugelman released footage online of Del Rio's 40th birthday roast. The almost two-hour show was put on sale for $14.99 and was used to help fund the post production of Hurricane Bianca.

== Release ==
Following a limited theatrical release, the film was released on video on demand on September 23, 2016, with a release to DVD in October 2016.

== Sequel ==
A sequel film, Hurricane Bianca: From Russia with Hate, was released on May 18, 2018. Dratch returned as the film's antagonist, while Katya Zamolodchikova joined the cast.

=== Future ===
In February 2019 GQ reported that a third film titled Hurricane Bianca 3 was in the works that would include several Drag Race alumni, as well as the return of Sykes and Dratch. According to Del Rio, the third film is set in Africa although it would not be filmed there due to budget constraints.

== Reception ==
Chicago Review gave a positive review and wrote: "Crowd-funded on a teensy budget, the movie is not without its charms, including Ryan Matthieu Smith's inventive production and costume design and a cast of unknowns who prove worthy straight men to Del Rio." An editor of Junkee rated the film a "B−", stating that the film "is occasionally spotty in its laughs, but fans of Bianca Del Rio won't want to miss their favourite insult factory."
