= Debbie Downer =

Fictional character

- Saturday Night Live character
- First appearance: May 1, 2004
- Last appearance: February 16, 2025
- Created by: Rachel Dratch; Paula Pell
- Portrayed by: Rachel Dratch

In-universe information
- Gender: Female

Debbie Downer is a fictional Saturday Night Live character who debuted in 2004 was portrayed by Rachel Dratch and created by Paula Pell and Dratch.

Dratch's character usually appears at social gatherings and interrupts the conversation to voice negative opinions and pronouncements. She is especially concerned about the rate of feline AIDS, which she repeatedly claims is the number one killer of domestic cats. Dratch came up with the idea for the original sketch during an awkward vacation interaction in Costa Rica.

Evolving from the character's popularity, the name Debbie Downer eventually became an established slang phrase. The phrase refers to a pessimistic person who frequently adds bad news and negative feelings to a gathering, thus bringing down the mood of everyone around them. The word downer had been used in this meaning since at least the 1970s. A Funko Pop collectable figure of the character was released in 2025.

== Appearances ==
=== First appearance (2003–04 season) ===
The first appearance of Debbie Downer was on May 1, 2004, with guest host Lindsay Lohan. Debbie and five members of the McKusick family—played by Lohan, Jimmy Fallon, Dratch, Amy Poehler, Fred Armisen, and Horatio Sanz—are eating breakfast at a restaurant in Walt Disney World. While the family makes small talk, Debbie makes negative comments on worrying current events such as feline AIDS, followed by a knowing look at the camera and a cartoonish "wah-wah" sound made by a muted trombone. The sketch was written by Dratch and Paula Pell and was originally set in an office.

In the sketch, everyone on camera breaks character and begins to laugh because of both the "wah-wah" sound effect—which the cast did not expect—and Dratch flubbing a line early on and correcting herself. It was listed at number 99 as part of TV Land's "Top 100 Most Unexpected Moments in TV History" and has been named one of the show's best and most memorable sketches.

=== 2004–05 season ===
Debbie Downer appeared in a sketch in the 2004–05 season opener with Ben Affleck as the guest host. The cast members who appeared in this sketch were more composed and did not laugh out loud at Debbie's pronouncements. This trend continued throughout the rest of the season.

In future airings of the Affleck episode, the live Debbie Downer sketch was replaced by the dress rehearsal version, along with an opening title card explaining that the dress rehearsal "worked better." In the dress rehearsal, the cast all cracks up just as they did in the Lindsay Lohan episode.

The character appeared two more times that season: once at Thanksgiving dinner (with Luke Wilson as host) and another at the Oscars with Hilary Swank (playing herself). The latter sketch revealed that Debbie babysat Swank when Swank was a child. Will Forte appeared in the sketch as Swank's then-husband, Chad Lowe.

=== 2005–06 season ===
In 2005, the season premiere of Saturday Night Live featured a Debbie Downer sketch at the end of the episode. Host Steve Carell's character, Bob Bummer, is just as negative, and he and Debbie fall in love.

The December 17, 2005, episode, hosted by Jack Black, included a Christmas-themed sketch showing Debbie in her childhood during a visit from Santa Claus. This episode contradicts her debut sketch, as here she refers to her last name being "Downer."

On April 15, 2006, Debbie returned for her final appearance before Dratch departed the show. In this episode, Debbie appeared at a bachelorette party for her sister (portrayed by Lindsay Lohan) at a strip club in Las Vegas despite not being invited.

=== 2009–2010 season ===
During the May 8, 2010, episode hosted by Betty White, there was a Debbie Downer sketch filmed during dress rehearsal, but it was cut from the live show due to time constraints. The episode is now posted on NBC.com's Saturday Night Live page, featuring video clips of old and new sketches from the show's 35-years-and-counting tenure. A group of suburban women (all played by the guest actresses listed in addition to then-current cast member Kristen Wiig) are having a lingerie party and, as usual, Debbie Downer ruins everyone's fun. One housewife (played by Amy Poehler) yells at Debbie and asks her why she's so miserable all the time. Downer thinks back to her childhood where during her birthday, her depressed grandmother (played by White) tells her to enjoy her birthday cake now because gluten allergies run in her family.

=== 2014–15 season ===
During the SNL 40th Anniversary Special, Dratch appears briefly at the beginning as Downer, telling the audience that starting a show with a musical performance decreases viewership.

=== 2019–2020 season ===
Debbie appears in the March 7, 2020 episode hosted by Daniel Craig, where she is a guest at a wedding, bringing her melancholy with her. She complained about the coronavirus and, once again, feline AIDS.

=== 2024–25 season ===
During the Saturday Night Live 50th Anniversary Special, Dratch reprised her role playing a bartender who can't stop bringing up depressing topics such as the toxicity of both alcohol and the planet, before ultimately toasting to SNL's anniversary and "continuing advancements in curing feline AIDS". The special guest of the sketch was Robert De Niro.

== Theme song ==
Every Debbie Downer sketch opens with a prologue. The prologue is followed by the Debbie Downer theme song (and corresponding video), which in turn is followed by the body of the sketch. Each sketch closes with a repeat of the last line of the theme song and with one more negative fact from Debbie. The sketch ends with a close-up of Debbie's pained expression.

Theme song lyrics:

You're enjoying your day
Everything's going your way
Then along comes Debbie Downer
Always there to tell you 'bout a new disease
A car accident
Or killer bees
You'll beg her to spare you
"Debbie, please!"
But you can't stop Debbie Downer

The Christmas sketch began with a special theme song. It featured an animated Debbie, looking much like The Grinch, and a tune similar to "You're a Mean One, Mr. Grinch". Steve Carell's Bob Bummer also had his own theme song.

== SNL episodes featuring Debbie Downer ==
Date	Host
May 1, 2004	Lindsay Lohan
October 2, 2004	Ben Affleck
November 20, 2004	Luke Wilson
February 19, 2005	Hilary Swank
October 1, 2005	Steve Carell (as Bob Bummer)
December 17, 2005	Jack Black (Debbie Downer Christmas)
April 15, 2006	Lindsay Lohan
May 8, 2010	Betty White (unaired)
March 7, 2020	Daniel Craig
February 16, 2025	N/A (SNL 50th Anniversary Special)

== See also ==
- Recurring Saturday Night Live characters and sketches
