= Blame It On Bianca Del Rio Tour =

Drag queen Bianca Del Rio's third solo worldwide comedy tour

- Tour by Bianca Del Rio
- Start date: November 6, 2017
- End date: September 11, 2018
- Legs: 6
- No. of shows: 7 in Oceania; 2 in Asia; 2 in South America; 39 in North America; 24 in Europe; 2 in Africa; 76 in Total

Bianca Del Rio concert chronology
- Not Today Satan (2016–17); Blame It On Bianca Del Rio (2017–18); It's Jester Joke Tour (2019)

The Blame It On Bianca Del Rio Tour (2017–18) was the drag queen Bianca Del Rio's third solo worldwide comedy tour. Starting from Auckland in early November the season 6 winner of RuPaul's Drag Race played sold-out shows across six continents. The tour was the comedienne's first visit to South Africa and Asia.

== Tour Dates ==
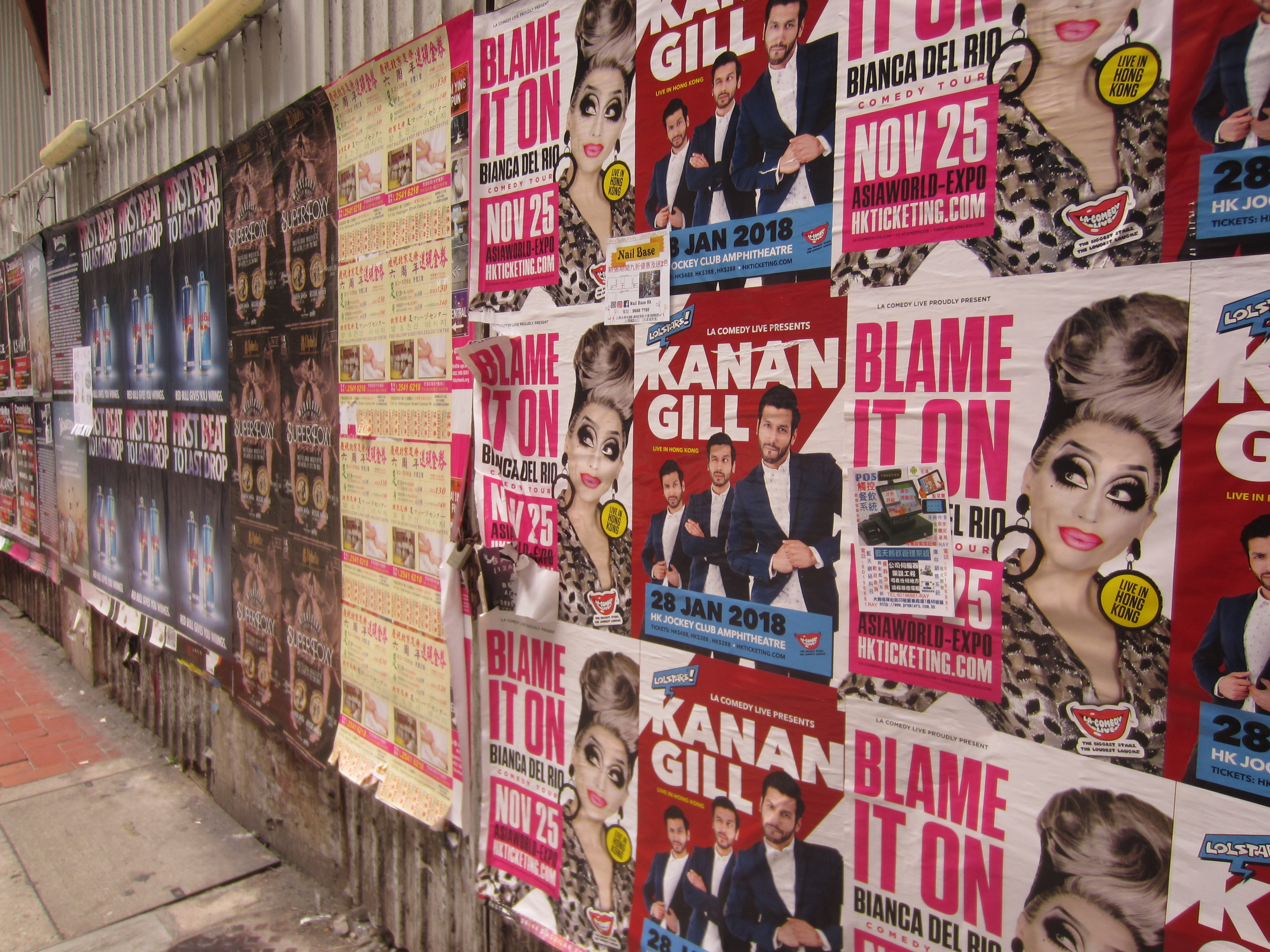
Posters for the Hong Kong performance in 2017

| Date | City | Country | Venue |
Oceania
| November 6, 2017 | Auckland | New Zealand | ASB Theatre |
| November 9, 2017 | Sydney | Australia | Enmore Theatre |
| November 10, 2017 | Brisbane | Australia | Concert Hall, QPAC |
| November 11, 2017 | Melbourne | Australia | Comedy Theatre |
| November 13, 2017 | Canberra | Australia | Canberra Theatre Centre |
| November 14, 2017 | Adelaide | Australia | Thebarton Theatre |
| November 15, 2017 | Perth | Australia | Astor Theatre |
Asia
| November 25, 2017 | Hong Kong | China | AsiaWorld-Expo Hall 11 |
| November 26, 2017 | Singapore | | Shine Auditorium |
South America
| February 1, 2018 | São Paulo | Brazil | Teatro Bradesco |
| February 2, 2018 | São Paulo | Brazil | Teatro Bradesco |
North America
| February 21, 2018 | Minneapolis | United States | Woman's Club Theater |
| February 22, 2018 | Milwaukee | United States | Turner Hall Ballroom |
| February 23, 2018 | Detroit | United States | Royal Oak Music Theatre |
| February 24, 2018 | Chicago | United States | The Vic Theatre |
| February 25, 2018 | St. Louis | United States | The Pageant |
| February 28, 2018 | Houston | United States | Warehouse Live |
| March 1, 2018 | Austin | United States | The Paramount Theatre |
| March 2, 2018 | Dallas | United States | Majestic Theatre |
| March 3, 2018 | New Orleans | United States | Orpheum Theatre |
| March 6, 2018 | Fort Lauderdale | United States | Parker Playhouse |
| March 7, 2018 | Tampa | United States | Straz Center for the Performing Arts |
| March 8, 2018 | Orlando | United States | The Plaza Live |
| March 9, 2018 | Atlanta | United States | Variety Playhouse |
| March 10, 2018 | Ponte Vedra Beach | United States | Ponte Vedra Concert Hall |
| March 11, 2018 | Nashville | United States | James K Polk Theater |
| March 13, 2018 | Durham | United States | Carolina Theatre |
| March 14, 2018 | Richmond | United States | The National |
| March 15, 2018 | Washington | United States | Lincoln Theatre |
| March 16, 2018 | Philadelphia | United States | The Trocadero Theatre |
| March 17, 2018 | Boston | United States | Royale |
| March 18, 2018 | New York City | United States | PlayStation Theater |
| March 19, 2018 | New York City | United States | PlayStation Theater |
| March 20, 2018 | Toronto | Canada | Danforth Music Hall |
| March 22, 2018 | Hartford | United States | The Bushnell |
| March 23, 2018 | Pittsburgh | United States | Stage AE |
| March 24, 2018 | Columbus | United States | Southern Theatre |
| March 27, 2018 | Denver | United States | Gothic Theatre |
| March 29, 2018 | San Francisco | United States | Warfield Theatre |
| March 30, 2018 | San Diego | United States | Balboa Theatre |
| March 31, 2018 | Los Angeles | United States | The Theatre at Ace Hotel |
| April 5, 2018 | Portland | United States | Revolution Hall |
| April 6, 2018 | Seattle | United States | Showbox Sodo |
| April 7, 2018 | Vancouver | Canada | Vogue Theatre |
| April 8, 2018 | Seattle | United States | Showbox Sodo |
Europe
| June 7, 2018 | Bergen | Norway | Ole Bull Scene |
North America
| June 28, 2018 | San Jose | United States | California Theatre |
| June 29, 2018 | Sacramento | United States | Crest Theatre |
| June 30, 2018 | Santa Rosa | United States | Luther Burbank Center for The Arts |
| July 1, 2018 | Phoenix | United States | Orpheum Theatre |
| July 9, 2018 | Provincetown | United States | Provincetown Town Hall |
Europe
| July 17, 2018 | London | United Kingdom | Eventim Apollo |
| July 18, 2018 | Manchester | United Kingdom | O2 Apollo |
| July 19, 2018 | Liverpool | United Kingdom | Empire Theatre |
| July 20, 2018 | Glasgow | United Kingdom | SEC Armadillo |
| July 21, 2018 | Edinburgh | United Kingdom | Usher Hall |
| July 23, 2018 | Manchester | United Kingdom | O2 Apollo |
| July 25, 2018 | Newcastle | United Kingdom | Newcastle City Hall |
| July 26, 2018 | Brighton | United Kingdom | Theatre Royal |
| July 27, 2018 | London | United Kingdom | Eventim Apollo |
| July 28, 2018 | Brighton | United Kingdom | Brighton Centre |
| July 29, 2018 | London | United Kingdom | Eventim Apollo |
| July 30, 2018 | Birmingham | United Kingdom | Symphony Hall |
| August 1, 2018 | Cardiff | United Kingdom | St David's Hall |
| August 2, 2018 | Cardiff | United Kingdom | St David's Hall |
| August 3, 2018 | Amsterdam | Netherlands | Theater Amsterdam |
| August 4, 2018 | Belfast | United Kingdom | Waterfront Hall |
| August 6, 2018 | Dublin | Ireland | Bord Gais Energy Theatre |
Africa
| August 10, 2018 | Cape Town | South Africa | Artscape Opera House |
| August 11, 2018 | Johannesburg | South Africa | Teatro |
Europe
| September 4, 2018 | Stockholm | Sweden | Gota Lejon |
| September 5, 2018 | Berlin | Germany | Admiralspalast |
| September 7, 2018 | Antwerp | Belgium | Stadsschouwburg Antwerpen |
| September 9, 2018 | Helsinki | Finland | Finlandia Hall |
| September 10, 2018 | Oslo | Norway | Folketeateret |
| September 11, 2018 | Helsinki | Finland | Finlandia Hall |
