= A 24-Decade History of Popular Music =

2016 Musical/performance art work

- A Radical Faerie Realness Ritual
- Music: Various
- Lyrics: Various
- Book: Taylor Mac
- Premiere: October 8–9, 2016: St. Ann's Warehouse, Brooklyn, NY
- Awards: Edward M. Kennedy Prize; Finalist for Pulitzer Prize for Drama

A 24-Decade History of Popular Music is a musical and performance art work by American actor, playwright, and cabaret performer Taylor Mac.

A 24-Decade History of Popular Music has received acclaim and numerous awards, including the Edward M. Kennedy Prize, as well as becoming a finalist for the Pulitzer Prize for Drama. The production has been performed at festivals and performance venues in the U.S. and internationally, often in abbreviated versions or separate acts, and occasionally in full. In 2023, a concert film directed by Academy Award winners Rob Epstein and Jeffrey Friedman premiered and was released through HBO and Max.

== Summary ==
Premiered in full in 2016, the musical uses mainly pre-existing songs popular throughout the history of the United States to examine and reframe American history through the experiences of marginalized communities. Mac says that "A 24-Decade History of Popular Music is a reenactment of how the individual(s) may lose the long game but communities and movements, if continually brought together, have the potential to thrive while bending towards justice." Presented in eight acts and featuring 246 songs, the production is intended to last twenty-four hours when performed to completion.

== Personnel ==
- Taylor Mac – Playwright, performer, co-director
- Matt Ray – Musical direction, arrangements, performer
- Niegel Smith – Co-director
- Machine Dazzle – Costume designer
- Jocelyn Clarke – Dramaturg
- Mimi Lien – Scenic design
- John Torres – Lighting design

== Overview ==
The complete production is performed over eight acts, with each act representing three decades of U.S. history.

- ACT I: 1776-1806 – Founding Father Drag, Women's Lib, and Crazy Jane
- ACT II: 1806-1836 – Young Love, Blindfolds, and Murder Ballads
- ACT III: 1836-1866 – Puppets, Whitman, and Civil War
- ACT IV: 1866-1896 – Circus, Mikado, and the Oklahoma Land Rush
- ACT V: 1896-1926 – Tenements, Trenches, and Speakeasies
- ACT VI: 1926-1956 – The Depression, Prison Fantasies, and the Atomic Bomb
- ACT VII: 1956-1986 – A March, a Riot, and a Backroom Sex Party
- ACT VIII: 1986-2016 – Direct Action, Radical Lesbians, and Originals

== Development ==
15 years old, 14 years old, I went to the first or second AIDS walk that was in San Francisco, and I had never met an out homosexual before. It was a pretty profound experience for a little kid that grew up in suburbia and a pretty normative, slightly oppressive environment. Even ... It was discovering queer history, queer agency, queer community because it was deteriorating from this epidemic. So I wanted to make a show about it. So this is what the show is: its a metaphorical representation of that experience from a 15-year-old kid's perspective.

—Taylor Mac

A 24-Decade History's development began in 2011, with the goal of holding one marathon performance in 2016.

Taylor Mac, music director Matt Ray, costume designer Machine Dazzle, and co-director Niegel Smith developed the show over five years, holding workshops and performing abridged versions at festivals and small venues. The show was workshopped as part of the Sundance Institute's 2015 Theatre Lab.

The show's length, strenuous performance, and strong audience participation are intended to make the audience build bonds at having gone through "a dire circumstance with us over a 24-hour period." Mac says, "I believe theater is community and I think of myself as a community activist; someone whose job it is to bring people together, give them a shared experience and remind them of the things they've forgotten, dismissed or buried."

== Productions ==
Many productions of the show are abridged versions, with the songs and subject matter confined to specific decades or themes. At different touring sites, local performers and artists participate, and the show is modified to incorporate local history and songs from the region.

A 24-Decade History of Popular Music has been performed as a 24-hour marathon performance only once, from October 8–9, 2016, at St. Ann's Warehouse in Brooklyn, New York. Before the marathon performance, St. Ann's Warehouse also hosted the first complete presentation of the show, albeit in parts from September 15 through October 3, 2016.

Since the premiere performance, the 24-hour production has been staged several times, though broken up into four chapters of six hours each, spread over several days. The first of these stagings took place at the Curran Theatre in San Francisco, between September 15 and 24, 2017.

The Melbourne International Arts Festival hosted the production, playing the four chapters between October 11 and 20, 2017. Also during the festival, Taylor Mac performed The Inauguration on October 5, an abbreviated version of the show that lasted from 90 minutes to two hours, as well as The Wrap on October 22, also featuring songs from the show.

From March 15 to 24, 2018, the four-chapter production played at the Theater at the Ace Hotel in Los Angeles, presented by the UCLA Center for the Performing Arts (CAP UCLA).

A 24-Decade History was hosted by the 2018 Philadelphia International Festival of the Arts, playing at the Kimmel Center for the Performing Arts. For this production, the performance was divided into two twelve-hour parts, with the first part beginning on June 2, and the second part beginning on June 9, 2018.

The first act only debuted in London at the Barbican Centre as part of the London International Festival of Theatre, being performed on June 28, 29, and 30, 2019. In September 2019, abridged versions were performed at four tour stops in the United States, as well as five performances of Mac's Holiday Sauce show in December.

From October 10 to 20, 2019, the four-chapter show played as part of The Berliner Festspiele's Immersion program series.

== Awards ==
- 2017 Edward M. Kennedy Prize for Drama Inspired by American History
- 2017 Finalist for the Pulitzer Prize for Drama
- 2017 New York Drama Critics' Circle Award Special Citation
- 2017 Obie Award Special Citation
- 2017 Bessie Awards – Outstanding Production and Outstanding Visual Design
- 18th Helpmann Awards – Best Cabaret Performer (for Mac) and Best Special Event

== Documentary ==
On June 14, 2023, the concert film of the same name premiered at Tribeca Festival. Directed by Academy Award winners Rob Epstein and Jeffrey Friedman, the film covers the 2016 St. Ann's Warehouse premiere performance. On June 27, the film aired on HBO and began streaming on Max.

It won the juried Outstanding Costumes for Variety, Nonfiction, or Reality Programming at the 76th Primetime Creative Arts Emmy Awards

== See also ==
- American popular music
- American folk music
- Protest songs in the United States
