= Mangus! =

- Directed by: Ash Christian
- Written by: Ash Christian
- Produced by: Ash Christian; Heather Matarazzo; Simon Millar
- Starring: Ryan Nelson Boggus; Jennifer Coolidge; Heather Matarazzo; Leslie Jordan and John Waters
- Cinematography: Lyn Moncrief
- Edited by: Scott D. Martin
- Music by: John Dufilho; Musical: Scott Murphy; Caroline Murphy
- Production companies: Cranium Entertainment; Filmgate
- Distributed by: Wolfe Video
- Release dates: June 25, 2011 (Frameline); December 6, 2011 (DVD)
- Running time: 88 minutes
- Country: United States
- Language: English

Mangus! is a 2011 comedy film written, produced, and directed by Ash Christian. The film stars Ryan Nelson Boggus, Jennifer Coolidge, Heather Matarazzo (who also acts as producer), and Leslie Jordan, with a cameo by John Waters.

== Plot ==
Mangus Spedgewick is a typical high schooler living with his war veteran father, Mangus Sr., and neglectful stepmother, Raquel (Deborah Theaker), in a little town called River City, in Texas. It is a family tradition for the young male Spedgewicks to portray Jesus in the town production of Jesus Christ Spectacular, and Mangus is very excited about the upcoming auditions. Mangus auditions with other boys, including a talented and flamboyant classmate, Farrell Williamson, who is the mayor's son. Mangus lands the role, but that night, when he goes out in a limo with his friends, Timmy and Kimmy, there is a terrible car accident. Timmy and Kimmy are cut in half and Mangus loses the use of his legs.

Farrell's mother gathers signatures to get Mangus out of the play so that the role be offered to Farrell. The School District rules that Mangus cannot play Jesus. Play director Bruce (Leslie Jordan) is distraught by the decision, but still must give Mangus the bad news. When Mangus Sr. returns to the war, Raquel sends Mangus to live with his mother, a psychic named Cookie (Jennifer Coolidge), and his half-sister, Jessica Simpson, who live in a trailer with Cookie's boyfriend, Buddy.

Mangus spends his time with his half-sister Jessica Simpson and with his mother's boyfriend Buddy, who is almost as young as Mangus. Jessica Simpson reveals to Mangus that she is a lesbian and meets Bobbie, a black woman who sells ice-cream from a truck. While children wait to buy ice-cream, Jessica and Bobbie have sex in the truck.

Buddy takes Mangus to a strip club where, while getting a lap dance, Mangus hallucinates and meets Jesus Christ (John Waters), who encourages him to fight for the role.

Mangus vows to re-obtain the role, even if it means taking out the competition, a flamboyant classmate, Farrell Williamson, who, while showing Mangus his routine, falls through the coffee table and is injured (his fate is not revealed until towards the end of the film).

Mangus's father is injured in the war and returns home in a wheelchair. He decides to remarry Cookie.

Mangus believes Farrell is dead. He decides to leave town and go to Hollywood to pursue his dream of becoming a singer and disabled dancer. He takes with him his half-sister Jessica Simpson. But accidentally they end up in Hollywood, Florida. There Mangus receives a telegram offering him the part of Jesus again, despite his disability. Although Mangus and Jessica are out of money, they find a Greyhound employee who takes pity on them and they manage to return home.

When Mangus returns to school, Bruce tells him that since they didn't know he was coming back, they had offered the part to Harry. But Harry wants out of the role, and when Mangus asks him for the part, Harry gladly returns it to Mangus.

During the show, Raquel and Buddy finally manage to hook up, but they accidentally stumble into the stage and Buddy is caught with Raquel with his pants down.

For no apparent reason, the musical's opening number is sung by Santa. The rest of the cast is dressed mostly like hippies from Jesus Christ Superstar. Near the end of musical, Mangus is attached to the cross in his wheelchair.

After the play, Mangus's parents reconciled and the whole family go for ice cream.

== Cast ==
- Ryan Nelson Boggus as Mangus Spedgewick
- Jennifer Coolidge as Cookie Richardson
- Heather Matarazzo as Jessica Simpson
- Leslie Jordan as Bruce Jackson
- John Waters as Jesus Christ
- Charles Solomon Jr. as Mangus Spedgewick Sr.
- Deborah Theaker as Raquel Spedgewick
- Peter S. Williams as Buddy Richardson
- John D. Montoya as Farrell Williamson
- Leticia Magana as Patricia Williamson
- Brittni Horton as Bobbi Jackson
- Zander Scott as Timmy Jones
- Laura Spencer as Kimmy Jones
- Lynn Ambrose as Flossy
- Rex Cumming as Randy Jenkins
- Rodney Shed as Harry
