= Bianca Del Rio =

American drag queen

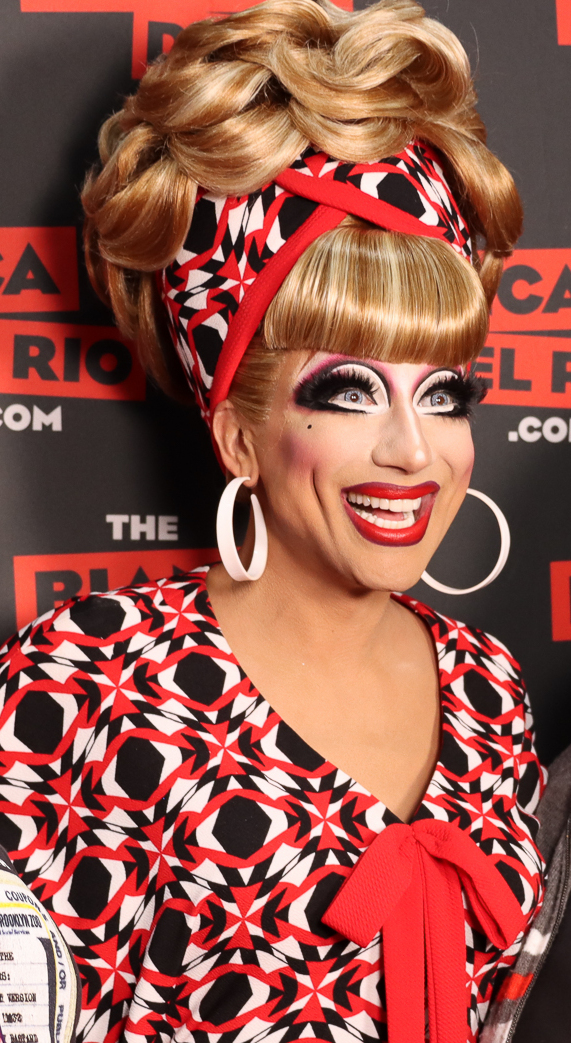
- Del Rio at RuPaul's DragCon LA, 2023
- Born: Roy R. Haylock; June 27, 1975 (age 51); New Orleans, Louisiana, U.S.
- Education: West Jefferson High School
- Occupations: Drag queen, comedian, actor, costume designer
- Years active: 1993–present
- Known for: RuPaul's Drag Race (season 6) winner
- Website: thebiancadelrio.com

Roy R. Haylock (born June 27, 1975), better known by the stage name Bianca del Rio, is an American drag queen, comedian, actor, and costume designer. He is known for winning the sixth season of RuPaul's Drag Race. Since his time on Drag Race, Haylock has written and toured several stand-up shows, including It's Jester Joke (2019), which also made him the first drag queen to headline at Wembley Arena. He has also performed as a host for various international tours, most notably Werq the World. In 2018, he published his first book, Blame It On Bianca Del Rio: The Expert On Nothing With An Opinion On Everything. In 2026 Bianca del Rio was announced as a contestant on the 5th season of The Traitors.

== Early life ==
Roy R. Haylock was born on June 27, 1975, and was raised in Gretna, Louisiana. He grew up Catholic. He is of Cuban descent on his mother's side and Honduran descent on his father's side. He is the fourth of five children.

He started acting and designing costumes for plays at West Jefferson High School. After high school, he decided to move to New York City, where he worked at Bloomingdale's for nine months before returning to Louisiana.

== Career ==
=== Early career ===
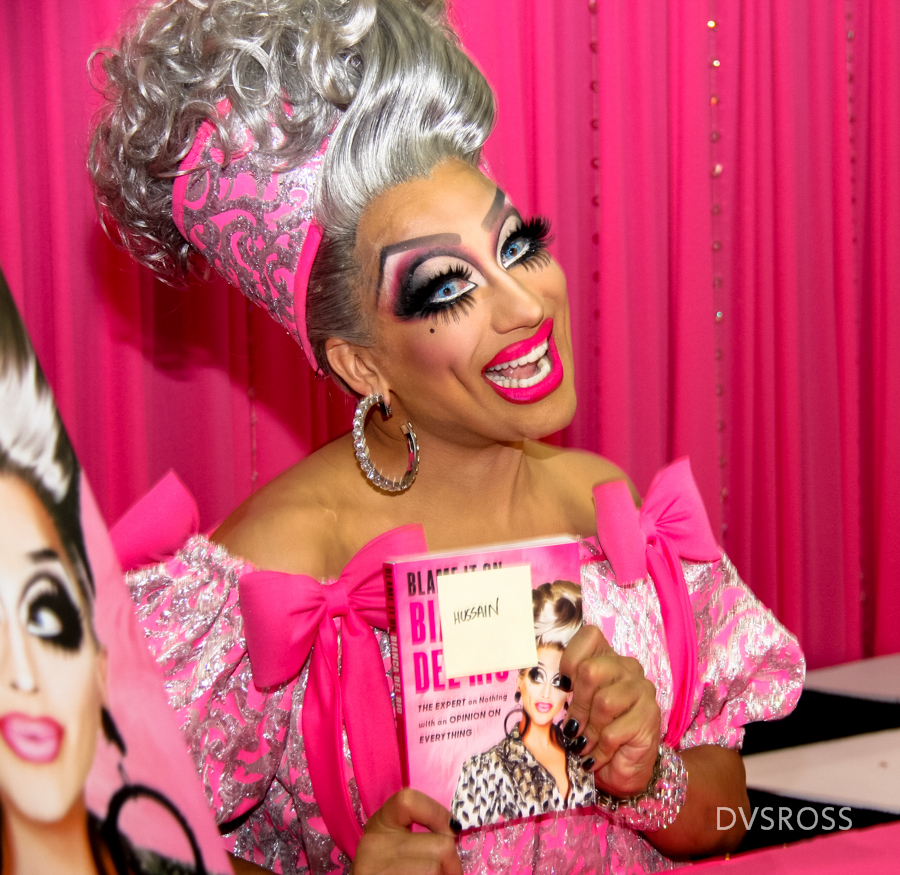
Bianca Del Rio at RuPaul's DragCon LA, 2018

Haylock began his career as a costume designer in New Orleans while still a teenager. In 1993, at age 17, he won a Big Easy Entertainment Award for Best Costume Design for Snow Queen, the first of 13 nominations he would receive for costume design, winning six of those awards. He also designed costumes for the New Orleans Opera.

In 1996, Haylock began performing in drag after appearing in the play Pageant. Local drag queen Lisa Beaumann saw him in the production and subsequently cast him in performances at the New Orleans nightclub Oz. He won the New Orleans Gay Entertainer of the Year title for three consecutive years. In 2001, Bianca Del Rio was selected as co-grand marshal of the 29th Southern Decadence celebration, alongside Pat "Estelle" Ritter and Rick Thomas.

Following Hurricane Katrina in 2005, Haylock relocated to New York City, where he continued working as a costume designer for theatre, ballet, and opera productions, including with Barbara Matera, Ltd. He also continued performing in drag, appearing in cabaret with Lady Bunny at XL Nightclub and in comedy roasts, including one featuring Patricia Krentcil, better known as "Tan Mom".

By 2010, Haylock had expanded into television and online media. He appeared in the web series Queens of Drag: NYC in 2010, Logo TV's stand-up special One Night Stand Up: Dragtastic! NYC in 2011, and the variety series She's Living for This in 2012. That same year, he appeared on the cover of the New York-based LGBTQ magazine Next's Summer Yearbook issue.

=== RuPaul's Drag Race ===
In December 2013, Logo TV announced that Haylock was one of 14 contestants selected to compete on the sixth season of RuPaul's Drag Race, an American reality competition series.

Over the course of the competition, Haylock never placed low or in the bottom in any challenge and never had to lip sync for her life, advancing to the three-person finale. On May 19, 2014, Haylock was crowned the winner of the sixth season, defeating fellow finalists Adore Delano and Courtney Act.

At the time of her victory, Haylock became the second winner and fourth contestant in the franchise to reach the finale without lip syncing for her life. She was also the first contestant in the history of the series to complete the competition without ever placing low or in the bottom of a challenge, and the first contestant of Hispanic descent to win the American edition of RuPaul's Drag Race.

Following her victory, Haylock made numerous guest appearances across the Drag Race franchise. She appeared by video message on the seventh season of RuPaul's Drag Race and the second season of RuPaul's Drag Race All Stars, returned as a guest on the eighth and tenth seasons of RuPaul's Drag Race, and appeared as a fake Lip Sync Assassin on the sixth season of RuPaul's Drag Race All Stars.

=== Theatre ===
Haylock appeared in New Orleans theatre productions including Psycho Beach Party, ...And the Ball and All, Cabaret, Grease, The Bad Seed, and Pageant. He performed at companies including Le Petit Theatre du Vieux Carre, Southern Rep Theatre, Le Chat Noir, Marigny Theatre, and North Star Theatre.

After relocating to New York City following Hurricane Katrina, Haylock returned to the New Orleans stage to appear in the first regional production of Rent following the musical's initial Broadway closing. He played Angel opposite Christopher Bentivegna as Collins at Le Petit Theatre du Vieux Carre.

In 2019, Haylock appeared as retired drag queen Hugo Battersby, also known as Loco Chanelle, in Everybody's Talking About Jamie at the Apollo Theatre in London's West End. Later that year, it was announced that she would reprise the role for a 12-week engagement beginning on December 9.

Between 2021 and 2022, Haylock reprised the role on selected dates during the UK tour of Everybody's Talking About Jamie. Later in 2022, she reprised the role in the North American premiere of the production at the Ahmanson Theatre in Los Angeles.

On June 16, 2025, Haylock was announced as Madame Pernelle in an off-Broadway production of Tartuffe at New York Theatre Workshop, alongside Matthew Broderick, Francis Jue, and Amber Gray.

=== Film ===
Haylock's film career expanded after his success on RuPaul's Drag Race, beginning with his first leading role in Matt Kugelman's comedy Hurricane Bianca in 2016. He starred as teacher Richard Martinez and his drag alter ego Bianca Del Rio, a gay schoolteacher who reinvents himself as a sharp-tongued drag queen after being fired from a small Texas high school. Hurricane Bianca featured an ensemble cast that included Rachel Dratch, Alan Cumming, Margaret Cho, RuPaul, and several contestants from RuPaul's Drag Race.

Haylock reprised the role in Hurricane Bianca: From Russia with Hate in 2018, which reunited much of the original cast while taking the story overseas. In 2019, he said that a third installment was in development, although it had not entered production as of 2026.

After the Hurricane Bianca films, Haylock appeared as himself in the 2020 documentary Workhorse Queen, which follows fellow RuPaul's Drag Race contestant Mrs. Kasha Davis. In 2021, he made a cameo as Miss Haylock in the film adaptation of Everybody's Talking About Jamie, with the character's surname serving as a reference to his own.

=== Television and web ===
Haylock appeared in the web series Queens of Drag: NYC, produced by gay.com, in 2010 alongside fellow New York drag performers Dallas DuBois, Hedda Lettuce, Lady Bunny, Mimi Imfurst, Peppermint, and Sherry Vine. The following year, she appeared on Logo TV's One Night Stand Up: Dragtastic! NYC, a stand-up comedy special filmed live at the Bowery Ballroom and hosted by Pandora Boxx.

In 2012, Haylock appeared on the variety series She's Living for This, hosted by Sherry Vine, and was featured on the cover of Next's Summer Yearbook issue.

After winning RuPaul's Drag Race, Haylock appeared in television and web productions including the Netflix comedy series AJ and the Queen in 2020 and co-hosted the news program NewsBeat in 2021. She also voiced Dina Saur in the animated web series Drag Tots, hosted The Pit Stop, served as a main judge on Hulu's Drag Me to Dinner in 2023, and appeared as a guest on Bad Education, Celebrity Family Feud, and Very Delta.

=== Other work ===
Following her success on Drag Race, Haylock has written and toured several stand-up shows, including The Rolodex of Hate (2014), Not Today Satan (2015–16), Blame It On Bianca Del Rio (2017–2018), It's Jester Joke (2019), which also made her the first drag queen to headline Wembley Arena, and Unsanitized (2021-2022).

She has also performed as a host on the Werq the World tour alongside other Drag Race queens.

In June 2019, a panel of judges from New York magazine placed Haylock first on their list of "the most powerful drag queens in America", a ranking of 100 former RuPaul's Drag Race contestants.

Haylock co-crafted with puzzle editor Christina Iverson the bonus crossword puzzle for The New York Times for June 2026.

== Filmography ==
=== Film ===
Year	Title	Role	Notes
2000	Cypress Edge		Assistant wardrobe
2010	The Sons of Tennessee Williams	Himself	Documentary
2011	National Lampoon's Dirty Movie	Drag Queen	Direct-to-video
2016	Hurricane Bianca	Richard Martinez / Ms. Bianca Del Rio	
2018	Hurricane Bianca: From Russia with Hate	Richard Martinez / Ms. Bianca Del Rio	
2020	Workhorse Queen	Herself	Documentary
2021	Everybody's Talking About Jamie	Miss Haylock	Cameo

=== Television ===
Key
†	Denotes television productions that have not yet been released

Year	Title	Role	Notes
2002	MTV Mardi Gras	Herself	TV special
2011	One Night Stand Up	Herself	Episode 10: "Dragtastic NYC"
2011	Threesome	Herself	Season 1, episodes 3, 4, 14 and 15
2011	Bad Girls Club: New Orleans	Herself	Season 7, episode 5
2012–13	She's Living for This	Herself	Season 1, episode 5: "The Bianca Del Rio Episode"; Season 2, episode 4
2014	RuPaul's Drag Race (season 6)	Herself	Contestant (winner)
2014	RuPaul's Drag Race: Untucked (season 6)	Herself	Contestant (winner)
2015	RuPaul's Drag Race (season 7)	Herself	Episode 7: "Snatch Game" (via video message); Episode 13: "Countdown To The Crown"; Episode 14: "Grand Finale"
2015	Big Brother's Bit on the Side	Herself	Celebrity panelist for the show on September 17, 2015
2016	RuPaul's Drag Race (season 8)	Herself	Episode 9: "The Realness"
2016	Bianca's Rolodex of Hate	Herself	60-minute stand-up special, aired May 9, 2016 on Logo TV.
2016	RuPaul's Drag Race All Stars (season 2)	Herself	Episode 2: "All Stars Snatch Game" (via video message)
2018	RuPaul's Drag Race (season 10)	Herself	Episode 7: "Snatch Game"
2020	AJ and the Queen	Drag Queen	Guest appearance: Season 1, episode 1
2020	RuPaul's Drag Race All Stars: Untucked (season 2)	Herself	Episode 3: "Get a Room!" (via video message)
2021	The Sherry Vine Show	Herself	Guest
2021	Dragging the Classics: The Brady Bunch	Carol Brady	
2021	NewsBeat	Herself	Co-host
2021	RuPaul's Drag Race All Stars (season 6)	Herself (as fake Lip-Sync Assassin)	Episode 5: "Pink Table Talk"
2023	Bad Education	Herself	Series 4, Episode 2
2023	Drag Me to Dinner	Herself	Hulu original; Main judge
2023	Celebrity Family Feud	Herself	Guest
2027	The Traitors †	TBD	Season 5

=== Web series ===
Year	Title	Role	Notes	Ref
2010	Queens of Drag: NYC	Herself (in drag)	Produced by gay.com	
2013	Kings of New York	Himself	Produced by Lucas Entertainment	
2014	Really Queen?	Herself (in drag)	Produced by WOW Presents	
2014	Transformations	Himself	Episode: "Bianca Del Rio"	
2018	Drag Tots	Dina Saur (voice)	8 episodes	
2020-present	The Pit Stop	Herself (in drag)	Guest; Host (2023, 2026)	
2022	Bianca Saves Christmas!	Herself (voice)	Animated short film	
2023	LGBTQ Herstory Month: Honoring Latinx Heroes	Herself	Web special	
2023	Very Delta	Herself	Guest; Episode 71: "Are You Very Del Dio?"	

=== Music videos ===
Year	Title	Artist(s)	Ref.
2014	"Sissy That Walk"	RuPaul	
2014	"Mean Gays"	Courtney Act	
2014	"Dance Like You Got Good Credit"	Cazwell & Cherie Lily	
2015	"Hieeee"	Alaska Thunderfuck	
2018	"Girly"	John Duff	

== Theatre ==
Year	Title	Role	Theatre	Ref.
1998	Psycho Beach Party	Marvel Ann	True Brew Theatre	
1998	At the Club Toot Sweet on Bourbon Street	Cooch Deville	Southern Rep Theatre	
1998	...And the Ball and All	Ernesto	North Star Theatre	
1999	...And the Ball and All	Ernesto	Southern Rep Theatre	
2002	Cabaret	Emcee	Le Petit Theatre du Vieux Carre	
2003	Bianca's Remote Out of Control	Various roles	Le Chat Noir	
2003	Hollywood Heaven	Various roles	Le Chat Noir	
2004	Grease	Vince Fontaine	Le Petit Theatre du Vieux Carre	
2004	Murder at Movary Manor	Daphne	Marigny Theatre	
2004	The Bad Seed	Hortense Daigle	Le Chat Noir	
2005	At the Club Toot Sweet on Bourbon Street	Cooch Deville	Le Petit Theatre du Vieux Carre	
2005	Pageant	Miss Industrial Northeast / Tawny-Jo Johnson	Le Petit Theatre du Vieux Carre	
2008	Cabaret	Emcee	Le Petit Theatre du Vieux Carre	
2008	Rent	Angel Dumott Schunard	Le Petit Theatre du Vieux Carre	
2010	She'll Be Dying		Bowery Poetry Club	
2010	Mayo on Your Breakfast at Tiffany's		Bowery Poetry Club	
2019	Everybody's Talking About Jamie	Hugo/Loco Chanelle	Apollo Theatre	West End; Credited as Roy Haylock
2021-2022	Everybody's Talking About Jamie UK Tour	Hugo/Loco Chanelle	Liverpool Empire; Hull New Theatre; Theatre Royal Brighton; Mayflower Theatre Southampton	Select tour dates across UK in lieu of Shane Richie; Credited as Roy Haylock
2022	Everybody's Talking About Jamie	Hugo/Loco Chanelle	Ahmanson Theatre, Los Angeles	US debut of the production.
2025	Tartuffe	Madame Pernelle	New York Theatre Workshop, New York	

== Comedy tours ==
- The Rolodex of Hate Tour (2014)
- Not Today Satan Tour (2016–2017)
- Blame It On Bianca Del Rio Tour (2017–18)
- It's Jester Joke Tour (2019)
- Unsanitized Tour (2021-2022)
- Dead Inside Tour (2024-2025)
- It Gets Bitter Tour (2026-TBA)

== Awards and nominations ==
Year	Award-giving body	Category	Work	Results	Ref.
2014	NewNowNext Awards	Best New TV Personality	Herself	Won	
2018	Queerty Awards	Funny Person	Herself	Won	
2020	Queerty Awards	Drag Royalty	Herself	Nominated	
2022	Queerty Awards	Drag Royalty	Herself	Won	
2024	Webby Awards	Video, Long Form	The Pit Stop	Honoree	
2024	Webby Awards	Video, Variety & Reality	The Pit Stop	Won	

== See also ==
- Drag culture in New York City
- LGBTQ culture in New York City
- List of LGBTQ people from New York City
- NYC Drag March
- NYC Pride March
- Transgender culture in New York City

Awards and achievements
Preceded by Jinkx Monsoon	Winner of RuPaul's Drag Race; US season 6	Succeeded by Violet Chachki
