= The Dazzle Dancers =

American performance group

- Origin: New York City, New York
- Years active: 1996–present
- Members: Cherry, Houdini Shalom, Dazzle, Vinnie, DT, Edible, Hole, Machine, Pretty Boy, Smokey D, Propecia Destiny, Robbie, Sochny, Negro Noir, Besamé, Rinky Dinky, Chunky Cupcake, Booty du Chef

The Dazzle Dancers are a performance group founded in 1996 in New York City's Tompkins Square Park during Wignot (the first year that Wigstock didn't happen in the park) by artist Mike Albo (aka Dazzle Dazzle) and Grover Guinta (aka Vinnie Dazzle). The male and female dancers appear in spare costumes or nude at festivals, night clubs, and the Hipster scene.

The Dazzle Dancers have performed nationally at many late-night clubs, Coney Island Amusement Park, Wigstock, the Burning Man Festival in Nevada, and onstage with the band Blondie to a crowd of 20,000 people at the Millennium New Year's Eve Celebration in Miami, Florida.

In 2005 the Dazzle Dancers were a central theme in a feature film, the romantic gay comedy Adam & Steve.

Their costume designer is Matthew Flower, better known as Machine Dazzle, who has noted in an interview with Imagine Fashion that his designs are like sacred objects to him and believes in the transformative quality of costumes.
