= The Lily's Revenge =

2009 American five act play

The Lily's Revenge: A Flowergory Manifold is a 2009 American five act play. The book, lyrics, and conception were by Taylor Mac. The music was written by Rachelle Garniez. The Lily's Revenge is a multidisciplinary theatrical work, incorporating many different genres and elements of Noh theater, musical theater, puppet-theatre, installation art, verse play, dance, film, and circus performance. It is the second play in the "Armageddon Coupling" pairing, the first being Red Tide Blooming.

== Acts ==
=== The Deity (Act I): A Princess Musical ===
The play opens as the Lily comes on stage, late. The Lily is then introduced to Time, who warns the Lily and the audience that the play is long. Time warns the audience that they can either, “escape now or the telling of this tale will reduce you…to an addicted coagulation of nostalgia and hope. It is revealed that The Great Longing promised a climax in the form of a wedding. Time begs Lily to escape, as the promise of a wedding is a ruse to lure in audience members and begs the audience one last time to leave, announcing that the exits are where they entered. Time explains how the play everyone is about to witness is cheap (referring to "slutty"), and how, The Great Longing forced Time into an hourglass dress and, when the play ends, Time's breasts will be exposed. Time reveals how they once starred in the show, but, thanks to The Great Longing, have now been reduced to playing a concept.

As the band enters, Time reveals that the play has begun and everyone is doomed. The Flower Girls announce that they must wake The Great Longing to reveal the tale. "The Great Longing" begins. The Great Longing, who is disguised to blend into the stage curtain, is awoken, and The Great Longing reveals itself to be the God of Nostalgia. The Great Longing becomes aware of the Lily’s presence, and the Flower Girls go to find the Lily. This angers The Great Longing, as it is forbidden to look at the audience. Time announces that the Lily has brought to truth of here and now to the production. Time sees the way to freedom and announces a plan to put the Lily into the show.

As Time and The Great Longing argue over putting the Lily into the show, it is revealed that the Lily is an abandoned, organic flower. This outrages The Great Longing. Time scolds The Great Longing and mentions how Dirt, the God of Here and Now and The Great Longing’s sister, is a slave, forced in manufacturing a homogeneous world. The Lily asks to be in the play and Time puts a spotlight on the Lily, launching the song "From Sun".

After the Lily steals the show, The Great Longing accuses the Lily of being diseased. The Great Longing then seduces the Flower Girls into telling the Bride story. The Bride Hopeful, a Bunraku puppet, is revealed. The Lily is shocked by the Bride Hopeful's nudity, and Prime Deity remarks how nudity sells tickets. The Lily discovers that, to steal the show, the Lily must woo the Bride, thus becoming the lead. The Lily interrupts the story and casts itself as the Bride Hopeful’s planted companion. The Lily also casts Time as the Bride Hopeful's evil stepmother and the Flower Girls for Time into an Evil-Step Mother costume. The Flower Girls then gag Time, allowing the Bride Hopeful to sing "I Dream". The Great Longing forces Bride Hopeful to age into Bride Deity. The Bride Deity, now older, breaks up with the Lily. Bride Deity goes for a stroll in the garden and begins to flirt with a Cardboard Man. The Lily chooses a man from the audience (an actor in disguises) and casts him to play the Groom Deity. Groom Deity sings "Pornographic Images". Prime and Subprime Deity yell at the Groom Deity for being a man instead of acting like a man.

The Great Longing comes back and warns the Lily about stealing the show. The Great Longing takes a hold of the story and announces that the Lily was a beacon of the Bride's failure and the only thing standing in the way of her happiness. The Bride cuts a petal off of The Lily and is about to cut off another one when The Stepmother crawls on and gestures for her to stop. The Bride begins to sing "Too Little Too Late", and declares that she'll settle for little and late. The Lily tells the Bride that she doesn’t have to settle and that they've always loved her. But, after some encouragement form Prime Deity, the Groom declares that marriage is not between a woman and a plant. Outraged, the Lily takes control of the show and uproots itself. The Bride makes a deal with the Lily. If the Lily can prove to be a man in four hours time, then the Bride will marry it. Mary, who is now revealed to be Susan Stewart, critical theorist, frees Time of the curse of the Evil Stepmother.

=== The Ghost Warrior (Act II): An Act in Iambic, Song, Haiku ===
When the audience arrives, the stage is no longer set up as a proscenium and is now a round. The characters speak directly to the audience in this act, instead of overhead. The scene opens as Master Sunflower discovers that The Daisies won’t take root. Tick comes on and announces that there is to be a wedding on garden grounds. Master Sunflower wishes that Dirt would send her star from her prophecy. This prophecy states that a Lily Flower, one with five petals, will free Dirt and destroy The Great Longing's reign. As Tick leaves with the uprooted Daisies, Lily falls from the window sill and sings "A Flower Falls". Master Sunflower crosses the stage incredibly slowly to go to the Lily and help it. Master Sunflower announces that this play was inspired by Noh, explaining the slow movement. As Master Sunflower speaks to the Lily, it is revealed that Master Sunflower only speaks in iambic verse. The Lily shares to Master Sunflower how it has been cursed and must act like a man. Master Sunflower tells the Lily that it needs to learn the ways of the flowers and brings Baby’s Breath to the stage, who tries to strangle the Lily. When Baby's Breath releases the Lily, it announces the flowers who are going to participate in day’s Haiku-Off. The Lily reveals how it once had five petals, but one fell off, and the other flowers are amazed by the presence of The Chosen Flower. Baby's Breath begins to tell the Lily, the newly discovered Chosen Flower, the Tale of Dirt, and how it is the Lily's mission to free Dirt. Led by Master Sunflower, the flowers sing "The Flower's Nightmare" to inspire the Lily.

=== The Love Act (Act III): A Dream Ballet ===
In this act, the dialogue takes place between and within the movement. The Lily hits a wall and looses a third petal. The Bride and Groom Deity have transformed into Bride Love and Groom Love. They are setting up for their wedding, and every possible disaster that can happen, does. They begin to fight over what the other is wearing to the wedding. The Bride announces that she has, over the course of the last hour, had time to think about the Lily.

=== The Living Person (Act IV): A Silent Film ===
In this act, the audience sits in the middle of the stage, surrounded by four projection screens. A silent movie plays. During the movie, the Lily goes to the Factory Farm to free Dirt. The Lily is assigned Pope John Paul as a personal trainer and a stylist named Ron. The Lily announces that it only needs to become a metaphorical man, and Diana, Pope John Paul, and Ron laugh at it. The film changes and morphed into a history collage, showing weddings, parades, and political actions. The film then changes to Lily's perspective with the face of Dirt superimposed over everything else. Dirt reveals that The Great Longing had the Lily trapped in the technology of the Factory Farm and gave it electroshock treatment to turn the Lily into a man. The Lily begins to wonder if marriage was worth pulling itself from its pot, losing its petals, and staying celibate. The Lily talks about how it is discovering how marriage is a sexist, exclusionary and limited billion-dollar industry. Dirt asks Lily when it will stop equating love with equality. The Lily says how it wants to create community theatre to love others and, by doing this, the Lily frees Dirt.

=== The Mad Demon (Act V): Divine Madness ===
The Lily interrupts the wedding and hands the story over to the newly freed Dirt. Dirt defeats The Great Longing, ending the reign of nostalgia. By doing this, the flowers, brides, and grooms are all free to love whomever they wish. The Pope then enters with a machine gun and shoots everyone. The ensemble begins the song "A Flower Falls." Time reveals their breasts as an act of beauty rather than a crude act. On the Lily's final breath, it asks the question "Will you marry me?" The lights fade black, and the show ends.

== Musical numbers ==
- "Great Longing"
- "From Sun"
- "I Dream"
- "Pornographic Images"
- "Too Little, Too Late"
- "A Flower Falls"
- "The Great Longing Reprise"
- "The Flowers Nightmare"
- "Ya Ya Do It"

=== Songs flushed from the show ===
Not all of the songs written by Rachelle Garniez were used in the final show but are, however, in the musical recording. These songs include, "The Night," "How It Used to Be," and the "Way of the World." "The Donut Song" was written but never recorded.

== Intermissions ==
During The Lily's Revenge, there are three intermissions. These intermissions are filled by Kyogens, performed by the cast. While it is encouraged for some of the Kyogens to be devised by the company, there are a few scripted Kyogens.

=== Playwright's Monologue ===
This is considered the most important Kyogen and is scripted to play during all three intermissions. The Playwright's Monologue is a note from the playwright, performed by the entire cast.

=== The Discussion Disco ===
The Discussion Disco is an open dance party where audience members can discuss the themes of the play.

=== Context Corner ===
The Context Corner is a small library where the audience can go and read about various issues and references from the play.

=== Other ideas ===
Other ideas suggested by the script for the Kyogens are: Box Office Boogie, Outdoor Originals, Cafe Camp, Marriage Bashing, Wedding Party Photoshoot Booth, Critics Soap Box, Carpe Diem Demonstration, The Cake Smash, Peepshow Marriage Booth, and Songs We Flushed.

== Themes ==
A major theme in The Lily's Revenge is love and marriage. This is in part due to the inspiration of the play. The Lily's Revenge was written as a response to anti-gay marriage agendas. The play also discusses themes of tradition and nostalgia, which are two strategies that anti-gay marriage agendas use as a defense. Through the structure of the play and through the audience participation during both the acts and intermissions, Mac explores the theme of the Soul of Theatre. An additional theme that Mac explores is, through the Lily's journey, the Hero's Journey.

== Production history ==
The Lily's Revenge premiered at the HERE Arts Center, an Off-Off-Broadway theatre in New York, in 2009, featuring the play's author Taylor Mac as The Lily.

=== 2009 Production ===
In 2009, The Lily’s Revenge was presented by HERE Arts Center and Ethyl Crisp as a musical in four acts by Taylor Mac, with music by Rachelle Garniez. The production was directed by Paul Zimet, Rachel Chavkin, Faye Driscoll, Aaron Rhyne, David Drake, and Kristin Marting, with music direction by Matt Ray and scenic design by Nick Vaughan.

The creative team included costumes by Machine Dazzle, lighting design by Seth Reiser, makeup by Derrick Little, puppets by Emily Decola, choreography by Julie Atlas Muz, original drum music by Stefan Schatz, sound design by Matthew Tennie, video design by Aaron Rhyne, and production stage management by Julia Funk.

The production opened on November 1, 2009, and had a running time of approximately four hours and fifty minutes.

The cast featured Taylor Mac as Lily; Bianca Leigh as the Stepmother; Amelia Zirin-Brown as Bride Deity; Darlinda Just Darlinda as Bride Love; James Tigger! Ferguson as The Great Longing; with additional performances by World Famous Bob, Edith Raw, Kayla Asbell, Heather Christian, Matthew Crosland, Machine Dazzle, Kristine Haruna Lee, Ellen Maddow, Glenn Marla, Muriel Miguel, Frank Paiva, Tina Shepard, Rae C. Wright, Salty Brine, Daphne Gaines, Ikuko Ikari, Barbara Lanciers, Kim Rosen, Vanessa Anspaugh, Jonathan Bastiani, Saeed Siamak, Nikki Zialcita, Una Aya Asato, and Mieke Duffly.

=== Other productions ===
- Magic Theatre, San Francisco, April 21, 2011 to May 31, 2011
- American Repertory Theater, Cambridge, Massachusetts, October 12, 2012 to October 28, 2012
- Southern Rep, New Orleans October 17, 2012 to October 21, 2012
- The University of Massachusetts Amherst Department of Theater, Amherst, MA April 20, 2018 to April 29, 2018

=== Production facts ===
- The entire show takes a total of five hours to perform.
- The Magic Theatre offered audience members the opportunity to participate in a communal dinner during the first intermission.
- During the creation of the play, Nina Mankin suggested that Taylor Mac read Susan Stewart's essay On Longing. Mac loved the book so much that the character of Susan Stewart was added.
- The Factory Farm that Dirt is trapped in is based on real flower farms.

== Critical reception ==
Elisabeth Vincentellie of the New York Post said, "It's as if Shakespeare had been reincarnated as a hippie and written a picaresque musical....Some sequences do dilly-dally, and even the wacky internal logic falters by the end, but for the most part this experience is sweet, ramshackle and generous — and unique." Charles Isherwood of the New York Times said,

My favorite act may be the second (directed by Rachel Chavkin), inspired by Japanese theater and set in an anthropomorphized garden, in which flowers mourn their wholesale slaughter to provide decoration for weddings and engage in a competitive "haiku-off." (Immortal gag as the flowers trade poems: "Rose's turn.") I will never again regard baby’s breath as anything other than a sacrificial victim and symbol of human cruelty — and tastelessness. The costumes by Machine Dazzle, who also plays a daisy in this act, are magnificent here and throughout the show. 'The Lily's Revenge' is as much a party as a theatrical presentation, and you should be prepared to be stuck occasionally in a corner with a less than entrancing conversationalist. Some sequences — well, maybe most sequences — are longer than they need to be.

Mitch Montgomery of Backstage.com wrote,

Mac has gone to great lengths to express his love-me-love-me-not relationship with theatrical convention, hoping the audience will comprehend precisely the raunchy dialectic between, say, performance art, Japanese Noh theater, and burlesque. And by the time it's done, it is unquestionable. Mac might be a little overly ambitious in the delivery of his message, but after rearranging the theater four times and ticking through the whole history of performance, the point about looking more progressively at the institutions of theater and marriage emerges with profound clarity. A surprising but suddenly obvious connection lands just right: Both theater and marriage are essentially pure, intimate relationships that have only been corrupted into institutions.

Sam Theilman said in a review for Variety that,

Mac's engagement with big ideas — about marriage, about theater, and about love in general — carries the show a long way, and the sheer audacity of the enterprise makes what could potentially be a grueling experience into something cool and fun and even communal, if you're open to the possibility.

=== Awards ===
- 2010 - Obie Award
