= Ash Christian =

American actor, film director, and producer (1985–2020)

- Born: January 16, 1985; Paris, Texas, U.S.
- Died: August 14, 2020 (aged 35); Puerto Vallarta, Mexico
- Occupations: Actor, film director and producer

Ash Christian (January 16, 1985 – August 14, 2020) was an American actor, film director and producer. He was the founder of Cranium Entertainment. He wrote, directed and produced Fat Girls in 2006, for which he won Outfest's Award for Outstanding Emerging Talent, and Mangus! in 2011.

== Biography ==
Christian was born on January 16, 1985 in Paris, Texas, where he was raised.

At 14, Christian started to write and direct short films. At 16, he moved to Los Angeles to start an acting career. He wrote his first feature film, Fat Girls, which he starred in and directed at the age of 19. The movie won the Outstanding Emerging Talent Award at L.A. Outfest 2006 after it premiered at the Tribeca Film Festival.

Ash Christian co-produced Nate & Margaret in 2012, Hurricane Bianca in 2016, Social Animals and 1985 in 2018, Burn in 2019, and Chick Fight.

He acted in television series, including The Good Fight, The Good Wife, and Law & Order.

He was also a producer for the Broadway musical Next to Normal.

Christian died of a heart attack in his sleep while on vacation in Puerto Vallarta, Mexico.

== Filmography ==
=== Film ===
Year	Title	Role	Notes
2022	As They Made Us		producer
2021	The Sixth Reel		producer
2021	Down South		producer
2020	Chick Fight		producer
2020	Paper Spiders		producer
2020	Milkwater		executive producer
2019	Burn		producer
2019	Coyote Lake		producer
2016	BearCity 3	A Young 'Michael'	actor
2013	HairBrained	Cole	actor
2012	The Magic of Belle Isle	Carl Loop	actor
2012	King Kelly	Dean	actor
2011	Mangus!		writer, director
2009	Lushes	Cork	actor
2008	Indie	Ubie	actor
2006	Fat Girls		writer, actor, director
2005	Domino	Zoo President	actor

=== Television ===
Year	Title	Role	Notes
2019	The Good Fight	David Howell	Episode: The One Inspired by Roy Cohn
2019	The Oath	Driver	Episodes: Revenge
2014	The Good Wife	David Howell	Episode: The Line
2011	The Good Wife	David Howell	Episode: Silly Season
2014	Cleaners	J.R.	Episode: Welcome to the Zoo
2014	Cleaners	J.R.	Episode: Tripping Balls
2014	Cleaners	J.R.	Episode: The Not So Safe House
2014	Cleaners	J.R.	Episode: Welcome Home Sally
2014	Cleaners	J.R.	Episode: Yin & Yang
2011	Person of Interest	Onestate Tech Mitch	Episode: Judgement
2010	Law & Order	John Nolte	Episode: Rubber Room
2006	Pink Collar		
2006	Standoff	Billy Freymuth	Episode: Peer Group
2006	Ugly Betty	Jeff	Episode: Queens for a Day
2005	Over There	Pimply Kid	Episode: Situation normal
2005	Over There		Episode: Mission Accomplished
