= The Talking Band =

Off-off-Broadway theatre company

- Formation: 1974; 52 years ago
- Type: Off-off-Broadway company
- Location: New York City, New York, U.S.
- Affiliations: Resident company of the La MaMa Experimental Theatre Club

The Talking Band is an American off-off-Broadway theater company specializing in experimental theatre, based in New York City.

The company consists of three core artists: artistic director Paul Zimet; actor, writer and composer Ellen Maddow; and actor and director Tina Shepard. The Talking Band has collaborated with Taylor Mac, Louise Smith, and Marcus Gardley.

== History ==
The group was founded in 1974 by Ellen Maddow, Tina Shepard and Paul Zimet. It started at The Open Theatre, where Maddow, Shepard and Zimet worked as core company members. Director, actor and writer Joseph Chaikin founded the Open Theatre. After Chaikin disbanded The Open Theatre in 1973, Maddow, Shepard and Zimet founded a new theatre company, The Talking Band.

The group is a resident company at La MaMa Experimental Theatre Club, where it has produced and performed many of its plays. The group's first production at La MaMa was Pedro Paramo in 1979.

It has also performed at Performance Space 122, Theatre for the New City, Dance Theater Workshop and Dixon Place. The group has also performed internationally, including The Roundhouse in London, England; The American Center in Paris, France; The Music Gallery in Toronto, Canada; The Kovcheg Theater in Moscow, Russia; Teatro La Batuta in Santiago, Chile; and the National Theatre Bucharest in Bucharest, Romania.

== Productions ==
The company has performed at La MaMa, PS 122, Theater for the New City, Dance Theater Workshop, The Ohio Theatre, The Flea Theater, and HERE Arts Center. Approximately 50 original productions have toured throughout the United States and internationally. Notable productions include Shimmer and Herringbone, Existentialism, The Following Evening, Lemon Girls or Art for the Artless, Marcellus Shale, The Walk Across America for Mother Earth, Bitterroot, Painted Snake in a Painted Chair, Hot Lunch Apostles, Black Milk Quartet, and The Three Lives of Lucie Cabrol.

The Talking Band incorporates poetry, dialog, and multi-media elements, alongside music and choreographed movement. Its first production was The Kalevala, which is based on the Kalevala, a 19th-century work of Karelian and Finnish epic poetry compiled by Elias Lönnrot, featuring music by Elizabeth Swados.

== Company members ==
=== Ellen Maddow ===
Maddow has written, composed, and performed most of the group's works. She has written plays including Panic! Euphoria! Blackout, Flip Side, Delicious Rivers, and Painted Snake in a Painted Chair. She performed in Existentialism created and directed by Anne Bogart at La Mama, and The Following Evening written and directed by Abigail Browde and Michael Silverstone at PAC-NYC.

=== Tina Shepard ===
Shepard is an actor and teacher at New York University. She has worked with several other companies and artists, including Chaikin, Anne Bogart, Target Margin and Buran Theatre. Shows she has contributed to include The Serpent, Terminal, Nightwalk, Electra, The Seagull, Tourists and Refugees and Trespassing. Shepard has taught acting, directing, voice and movement at Princeton University, Williams College, Smith College and NYU's Experimental Theatre Wing. In 2025 Tina was awarded an OBIE Life Time Achievement Award.

=== Paul Zimet ===
Zimet is a writer, director and actor, and serves as the group's artistic director. He has directed over thirty-five works for the company, including New Islands Archipelago, Imminence, Belize, The Parrot and Star Messengers. He received an Obie Award for directing Painted Snake in a Painted Chair.

== Awards ==
Collectively, the company and its founders have received 18 Obie Awards, including lifetime achievement awards for Paul Zimet, Ellen Maddow, and Tina Shepard.

== See also ==
- Culture of New York City
