= Rachel Dratch =

American actress (born 1966)

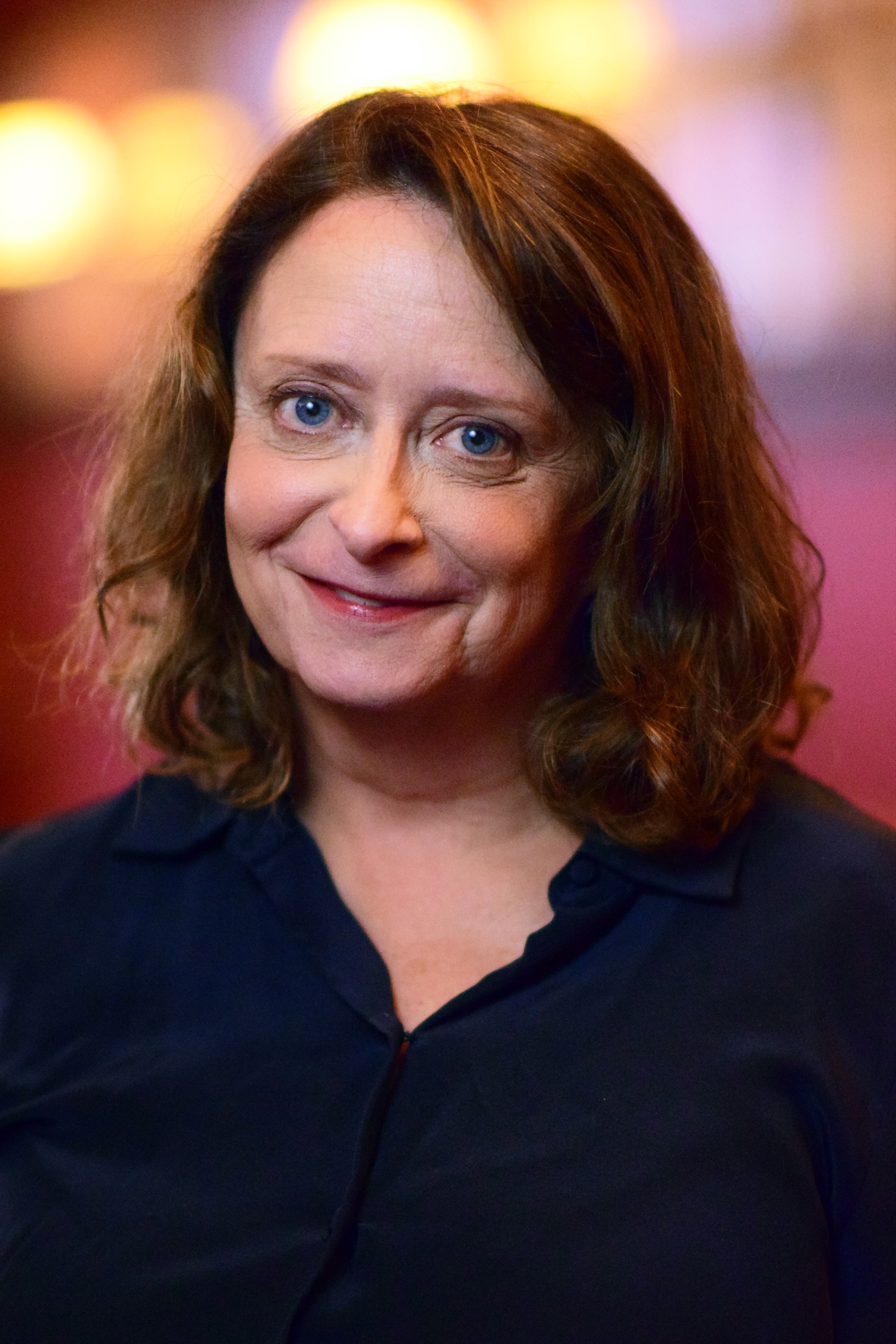
- Dratch in 2022
- Born: Rachel Susan Dratch; February 22, 1966 (age 60); Lexington, Massachusetts, U.S.
- Education: Dartmouth College (BA)
- Occupations: Actress; comedian; writer
- Years active: 1994–present
- Children: 1

Rachel Susan Dratch (born February 22, 1966) is an American actress, comedian, and writer. After she graduated from Dartmouth College, she moved to Chicago to study improvisational theatre at The Second City and ImprovOlympic. Dratch is widely known for her tenure as a cast member on the NBC sketch comedy series Saturday Night Live from 1999 to 2006, portraying a variety of roles, including Debbie Downer. She intermittently returned to SNL to portray Senator Amy Klobuchar.

Her other television credits include The King of Queens (2002–2004), Frasier (2004), 30 Rock (2006–2012), and Broad City (2014–2016). She has also played the recurring role of Wanda Jo Oliver on Last Week Tonight with John Oliver, and acted in films such as Dickie Roberts: Former Child Star (2003), Spring Breakdown (2009), That's My Boy (2012), and Plan B (2021).

In 2022, Dratch made her Broadway stage debut in POTUS: Or, Behind Every Great Dumbass Are Seven Women Trying to Keep Him Alive, for which she was nominated for the Tony Award for Best Featured Actress in a Play at the 75th Tony Awards. She was also nominated for the Tony Award for Best Featured Actress in a Musical at the 79th Tony Awards for her performance in Richard O'Brien's The Rocky Horror Show.

== Early life ==
Rachel Dratch was born on February 22, 1966, in Lexington, Massachusetts, the daughter of Elaine Ruth (née Soloway), a transportation director, and Paul Dratch, a radiologist at the Mount Auburn Hospital. Both of Dratch's parents were Reform Jews. Dratch attended Hebrew school and had a bat mitzvah. She is religiously nonobservant as an adult, and characterizes the faith she was born into as part of her cultural heritage.

Her younger brother, Daniel, is a television producer and writer; his credits include the TV series Anger Management and Monk. Dratch says she grew up as the "class-clown type" attending William Diamond Middle School and Lexington High School in Lexington. She said while performing in high school plays, she gravitated towards acting in comedies more often than in dramas.

Dratch attended the National Theater Institute at the Eugene O'Neill Theater Center in the fall of 1985 and graduated from Dartmouth College in 1988. She majored in drama and psychology, and was a member of the improvisational comedy group, Said and Done. While at Dartmouth, Dratch was a classmate of Kirsten Gillibrand.

== Career ==
Dratch was a member of the mainstage cast of The Second City comedy troupe for four years. She received the Joseph Jefferson Award for Best Actress in a Revue for the two revues in which she performed: Paradigm Lost and Promisekeepers, Losers Weepers. At The Second City, she performed alongside future Saturday Night Live head writers Adam McKay and Tina Fey, as well as future 30 Rock performer Scott Adsit. The first incarnation of her SNL "Wicked" sketch was performed in The Second City's Paradigm Lost.

In addition to acting, Dratch also played the cello onstage. The theater also hosted the first incarnation of Dratch & Fey (her critically praised two-woman show with Tina Fey), which was later performed at the Upright Citizens Brigade Theatre in New York City, where it was dubbed "the funniest thing to be found on any New York comedy stage" by Time Out New York.

Dratch has appeared in several films, including Martin & Orloff, The Hebrew Hammer, Down with Love, Dickie Roberts: Former Child Star, Click, I Now Pronounce You Chuck and Larry, Spring Breakdown, My Life in Ruins, Hurricane Bianca, and Hurricane Bianca: From Russia With Hate. She also has joined fellow SNL cast members on A.S.S.S.S.C.A.T.: Improv, which aired September 7, 2005, on the Bravo channel.

Dratch also made television appearances on NBC's Third Watch and in a recurring role on The King of Queens (playing Denise, the on-off girlfriend of Patton Oswalt's character Spence Olchin, who worked in a bowling alley). Her other television appearances include Portlandia, Monk, Frasier, Wizards of Waverly Place, 30 Rock, Aqua Teen Hunger Force, Inside Amy Schumer, Ugly Betty, and The Middle in season five.

She also appeared online with comedian Billy Eichner in a spoof of Jay-Z and Alicia Keys's "Empire State of Mind", titled "Forest Hills State of Mind."

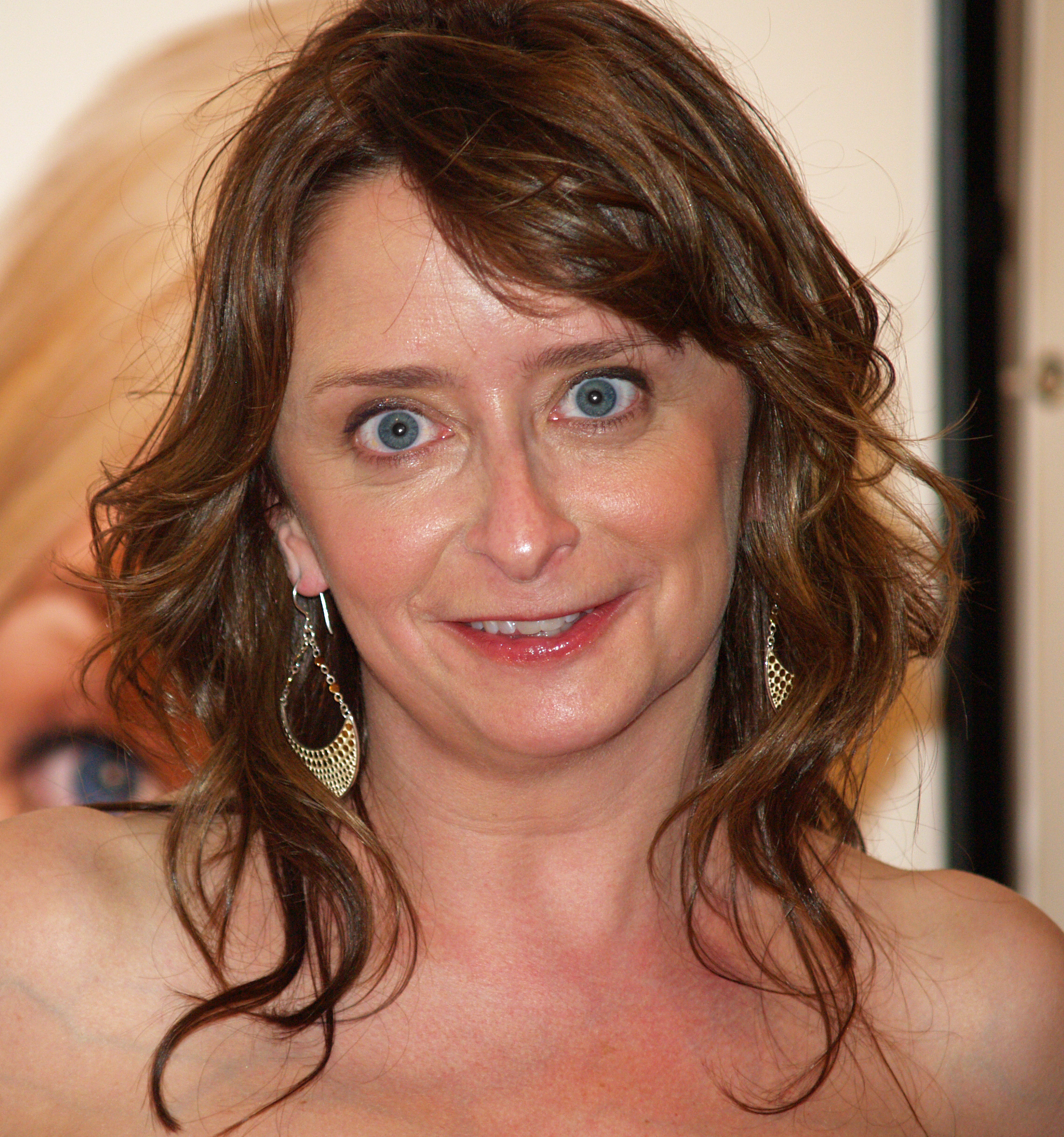
Dratch in 2008

Dratch was originally cast in the role of Jenna Maroney on 30 Rock as Jenna DeCarlo, and the original pilot episode features her in the role. After feedback from test audiences, the role was ultimately recast with Jane Krakowski. She went on to play a variety of small guest roles in several episodes of the first season, including Barbara Walters, Elizabeth Taylor, cat trainer Greta Johansen, custodian Jadwiga, a blue monster, and Dr. Beauvoir.

Dratch's memoir, Girl Walks into a Bar...: Comedy Calamities, Dating Disasters, and a Midlife Miracle, was published on March 19, 2012. In it, Dratch recounts her experiences after being recast in the 30 Rock pilot, including the birth of her child.

Dratch hosted the program Rachel Dratch's Late Night Snack on truTV in 2016. The sketch comedy program featured Dratch playing a waitress who does not talk in wraparound segments. Dratch also appeared in sketches and the show ran for two seasons.

=== Saturday Night Live ===
Dratch's tenure at SNL spanned 1999 to 2006. Dratch's recurring characters included Denise McDenna, a Boston teen; Sheldon, the junior-high-school boy from Wake up, Wakefield; Virginia Clarvin, a pretentious professor known as one of "The Love-ahs"; Abe Scheinwald, a Hollywood producer with a terrible acquisition record; and (perhaps most memorably) Debbie Downer, a depressed woman who brought others' moods down with her grim non sequiturs.

She made a guest appearance on SNL's season 37 Christmas show, hosted by former cast member Jimmy Fallon, in December 2011. She made another guest appearance with host Jimmy Fallon on April 15, 2017. On a February 3, 2018, season-43 episode hosted by Natalie Portman, she made a guest appearance as a "Patriot of New England" in a Revolutionary War-themed sketch parodying the fans of the New England Patriots and Philadelphia Eagles in advance of Super Bowl LII.

On a September 29, 2018, season-44 episode hosted by Adam Driver, she appeared as Senator Amy Klobuchar in the opening sketch, about the confirmation hearings of Supreme Court nominee Brett Kavanaugh. She continued to reprise the role of Klobuchar during sketches on the 2020 Democratic Party Presidential primary debates, specifically the fifth and sixth debates in November and December 2019.

=== Woo Woo with Rachel Dratch Podcast ===
Dratch launched her podcast Woo Woo with Rachel Dratch by QCODE alongside her longtime friend Irene Bremis on October 10, 2023. The show explores paranormal, metaphysical, and “woo-woo” topics such as spirits, psychic readings and crystals. Guests include well-known figures like Tina Fey, Will Forte, and Gloria Steinem, who share personal experiences of the supernatural.

== Personal life ==
In her book Girl Walks Into a Bar..., Dratch discusses hooking up with John Wahl, a consultant in the natural foods industry, after meeting in a bar in 2009. Six months later, Dratch was pregnant with their child, and on August 24, 2010, Dratch gave birth to Eli Benjamin, her son with Wahl. In an October 2010 interview, Dratch told People that her pregnancy at age 44 shocked her because she "had bought into all this stuff about, 'Once you're over 40 [pregnancy becomes difficult]'" and had "gone through the whole process of letting go of [the idea of having kids]." As of 2019, Dratch and Wahl were not a couple, but were on good terms and live near each other to parent their son.

== Books ==
- Dratch, Rachel (March 29, 2012). Girl Walks into a Bar...: Comedy Calamities, Dating Disasters, and a Midlife Miracle. New York: Gotham Books. ISBN 9781592407118. OCLC 830319371. Dratch also narrates the audiobook.

== Acting credits ==
=== Film ===
Year	Title	Role	Notes
1999	Serious Business	Jude Rusell	
2002	Martin & Orloff	Southern Woman	
2003	The Hebrew Hammer	Tikva	
2003	Down with Love	Gladys	
2003	National Lampoon's Barely Legal	Mrs. Greitzer	
2003	Dickie Roberts: Former Child Star	Reiner's Secretary	
2004	Freshman Orientation	Very Drunk Chick	
2004	Looking for Kitty	Julie	
2005	Her Minor Thing	Caroline	
2005	Winter Passing	Female MC	
2006	Click	Alice/Alan	
2006	The Pleasure Drivers	Counter Monkey	
2007	I Now Pronounce You Chuck & Larry	Sara Powers	
2008	Bill	Dr. Robardo	Short film
2008	Harold	Ms. Vicky Norris	
2009	Spring Breakdown	Judi Joskow	Also writer and producer
2009	Love N' Dancing	Kalle	
2009	I Hate Valentine's Day	Kathy Jeemy	
2009	My Life in Ruins	Kim Sawchuck	
2011	Just Go with It	Kirsten Brant	
2012	Teacher of The Year	Assistant Principal	Short film
2012	That's My Boy	Phil's Wife	
2013	Syrup	Clerk	
2014	A Little Game	Aunt Diane	
2015	The Grief of Others	Madeleine Berkowitz	
2015	Sisters	Kelly	
2016	Hurricane Bianca	Deborah Ward	
2016	Tracktown	Gail Marigold	
2018	The Week Of	Debbie Lustig	
2018	Hurricane Bianca 2: From Russia with Hate	Deborah Ward	
2019	Little	Agent Bea	
2019	Wine Country	Rebecca	
2021	Plan B	Ms. Flaucher	
2021	A Clüsterfünke Christmas	Marga	Also writer and producer
2022	I Love My Dad	Erica	
2023	Spider-Man: Across the Spider-Verse	Ms. C. Weber	Voice
2024	The 4:30 Movie	Mrs. David	
2026	Loves Company	Antoinette	
2026	Hexed †	TBA	Voice

=== Television ===
Year	Title	Role	Notes
1999–2006	Saturday Night Live	Herself/Various	Main cast (150 episodes)
1999	Saturday Night Live 25th Anniversary Special	Herself	Television special
2000	Third Watch	Darla	Episode: "History"
2002	Kim Possible	Adrena Lynn	Voice, episode: "All the News"
2002–2004	The King of Queens	Denise Ruth Battaglia	6 episodes
2004	Soundtracks Live	Dorothy Baker	TV film
2004	Monk	Julie Parlo	Episodes: "Mr. Monk and the Missing Granny"
2004	Game Over	Alice Smashburn	Voice, main role (6 episodes)
2004	Frasier	Horny Date	Episode: "Match Game"
2005–2006	O'Grady	Brooke	Voice, 2 episodes
2006–2012	30 Rock	Greta Johansen/Various	15 episodes
2008	Aqua Teen Hunger Force	Robot Wife	Voice, episode: "Robots Are Everywhere"
2008	Squidbillies	Hippie Woman	Voice, episode: "Earth Worst"
2008	Assy McGee	Various Roles	Voice, 6 episodes
2008	Avatar: The Last Airbender	Actress Aang	Voice, 2 episodes
2008	Superjail!	Various	Voice, episode: "Ladies Night"
2009	Yo Gabba Gabba!	Herself	Episode: "Clean"
2009	Wizards of Waverly Place	H.J. Darling	Episode: "Future Harper"
2009	Ugly Betty	Penny Meadows/Mindy Meadows	Episode: "The Fall Issue"
2009	Sherri	Teacher	Episode: "Indecision '09"
2010	Delocated	Cellist	Episode: "Mixer"
2010–2013	Fish Hooks	Esmargot/Koi	Voice, 28 episodes
2011	Funny or Die Presents	Dirkson	4 episodes
2011	Submissions Only	Fiona Evans	Episode: "Somethin' Else"
2012	The Secret Policeman's Ball 2012	Herself	Television special
2012	Up All Night	Linda	Episode: "Swingers"
2012	iCarly	Herself	Episode: "iShock America"
2012	Suburgatory	Paula Weingelb	Episode: "The Witch of East Chatswin"
2012	RuPaul's Drag Race All Stars	Herself/Guest Judge	Episode: "Queens Behaving Badly"
2012	The Cleveland Show	Maggie	Episode: "'Tis the Cleveland to Be Sorry"
2013–2014	The Middle	Principal Barker	2 episodes
2013–2015	The Awesomes	Joyce Mandrake/Tom Boy	Voice, 15 episodes
2014	The Neighbors	Pearl	Episode: "A Night in (Lou Ferrigno's Hibachi) Heaven"
2014	Inside Amy Schumer	Lisa	Episode: "Boner Doctor"
2014–2019	Broad City	Linda Lodi	3 episodes
2014–2025	Bob's Burgers	Jodi/Various	Voice, 8 episodes
2015	Salem Rogers: Model of the Year 1998	Agatha Todd	Television pilot
2015	Parks and Recreation	Roz Pinwheel	Episode: "Donna & Joe"
2015	Saturday Night Live 40th Anniversary Special	Debbie Downer	Television special
2015	Sesame Street	Museum Guard	Episode: "The Cookie Thief"
2015	Unforgettable	Rosie Webb	Episode: "Gut Check"
2015–2016	Difficult People	Chemo Woman/Casting Director	2 episodes
2015–2026	Last Week Tonight with John Oliver	Wanda Jo Oliver	8 episodes
2016	The Simpsons	Bostonian Doctor	Voice, episode: "The Town"
2016–2017	Nature Cat	Lulu Ladybug/Flo	Voice, 2 episodes
2016–2018	Rachel Dratch's Late Night Snack	Herself/Host	Main cast (57 episodes)
2017	Man Seeking Woman	Methelda	Episode: "Horse"
2017	Imaginary Mary	Mary	Voice, main cast (9 episodes)
2017	Angie Tribeca	Masha Chekhov	Episode: "Hey, I'm Solvin' Here!"
2017	Unbreakable Kimmy Schmidt	Dianne/Leonora	Episode: "Kimmy Googles the Internet!"
2017	Portlandia	Fred's Wife	Episode: "Amore"
2017	Bunsen Is a Beast	Wilda	Voice, episode: "Wilda Beast"
2017–2018	Great News	Mary-Kelly	3 episodes
2017–2020	At Home with Amy Sedaris	Florence Chervil/Elva DeFossil	2 episodes
2018	The Real Housewives of New York City	Herself	Episode: "Life is a Cabaret"
2019	Summer Camp Island	Bernadette	Voice, episode: "The Great Elf Invention Convention"
2019	Where's Waldo?	Wizard Fix-It	Voice, episode: "Mini Mayhem in Moscow"
2019	Shameless	Paula Bitterman	4 episodes
2019–2023	Teen Titans Go!	Negative Girl	Voice, 5 episodes
2020	Blue's Clues & You!	Herself	Episode: "Happy Birthday, Blue!"
2020	Ballmastrz: 9009	The Blab	Voice, episode: "Shameful Disease of Yackety Yack! Don't Talk Back! Be Silenced Forever!"
2020	The Good Fight	Linda Shuck	Episode: "The Gang Offends Everyone"
2020	Don't Let the Pigeon Do Storytime!	Herself	Television special
2020–2023	Harley Quinn	Nora Fries/Hippolyta	Voice, 12 episodes
2021	Mr. Mayor	Ms. Adams	3 Episodes
2021	Bubble Guppies	Alison Heart	Voice, episode: "Alison in Wonderland!"
2021	Archibald's Next Big Thing Is Here!	Patti	Voice, episode: "Crazy Maze/Super Sneaks"
2021–2022	Duncanville	Sondra/Winifred	Voice, 2 episodes
2022	Getting Curious with Jonathan Van Ness	Construction Worker	Episode: "Are Skyscrapers Huge Divas?"
2022	Kevin Can F**k Himself	Beatrice	Episode: "The Unreliable Narrator"
2022	StoryBots: Answer Time	Dr. Poppy Van Poobert	Voice, episode: "Dizzy"
2022–2023	American Dad	Nerfer/Homeless Woman	Voice, 4 episodes
2023	Hamster & Gretel	Helen	Voice, episode: "My Invisible Friend"
2023	Animal Control	Principal Smith-Wood	Episode: "Pigs and Minks"
2023	And Just Like That...	Kerry Moore	Episode: "Bomb Cyclone"
2023	Star Trek: Lower Decks	Dolorex	Voice, episode: "Empathalogical Fallacies"
2023–2024	Mulligan	Various	Voice, 14 episodes
2024	Royal Crackers	Doris	Voice, episode: "Bro Down"
2024	Grimsburg	Stan Flute	Voice, main cast (13 episodes)
2024	Fantasmas	Renally	Episode: "The Void"
2024	Doctor Odyssey	Bunny Rubens	Episode: "Pilot"
2025	SNL50: The Homecoming Concert	Herself	Television special
2025	Saturday Night Live 50th Anniversary Special	Debbie Downer	Television special

=== Theater ===
Year	Title	Role	Venue
2009	Minsky's	Beula	Ahmanson Theatre, Los Angeles
2010	Sylvia	Sylvia	George Street Playhouse, New Brunswick
2013	Love's Labour's Lost	Holofernes	The Public Theater, Off-Broadway
2014–2015	Tail! Spin!	Various Roles	Lynn Redgrave Theater, Off-Broadway
2015	Ripcord	Marilyn's Daughter	New York City Center Stage I, Off-Broadway
2016	White Rabbit, Red Rabbit	performer	Westside Theatre, Off-Broadway
2016	Privacy	Various Roles	The Public Theater, Off-Broadway
2022	POTUS: Or, Behind Every Great Dumbass Are Seven Women Trying to Keep Him Alive	Stephanie	Shubert Theatre, Broadway
2022	Guys and Dolls	Big Jule	The Kennedy Center, Washington, D.C.
2024	Gutenberg! The Musical!	Producer (one night only)	James Earl Jones Theatre, Broadway
2026	High Spirits	Edith	New York City Center Encores!, Off-Broadway
2026	The Rocky Horror Show	Narrator	Studio 54, Roundabout Theatre Company, Broadway
2027	You're a Good Man, Charlie Brown	Patty	New York City Center Encores!, Off-Broadway

=== Web ===
Year	Title	Role	Notes
2015	The Dratchelor	Herself	Funny Or Die web series

== Awards and nominations ==
Year	Award	Category	Work	Result	Ref.
2022	Tony Awards	Best Featured Actress in a Play	POTUS: Or, Behind Every Great Dumbass Are Seven Women Trying to Keep Him Alive	Nominated	
2022	Drama League Award	Distinguished Performance	POTUS: Or, Behind Every Great Dumbass Are Seven Women Trying to Keep Him Alive	Nominated	
2026	Tony Awards	Best Featured Actress in a Musical	Richard O'Brien's The Rocky Horror Show	Nominated	
2026	Dorian Award	Outstanding Featured Performance in a Broadway Musical	Richard O'Brien's The Rocky Horror Show	Nominated	
