= Taylor Mac =

American actor and performance artist

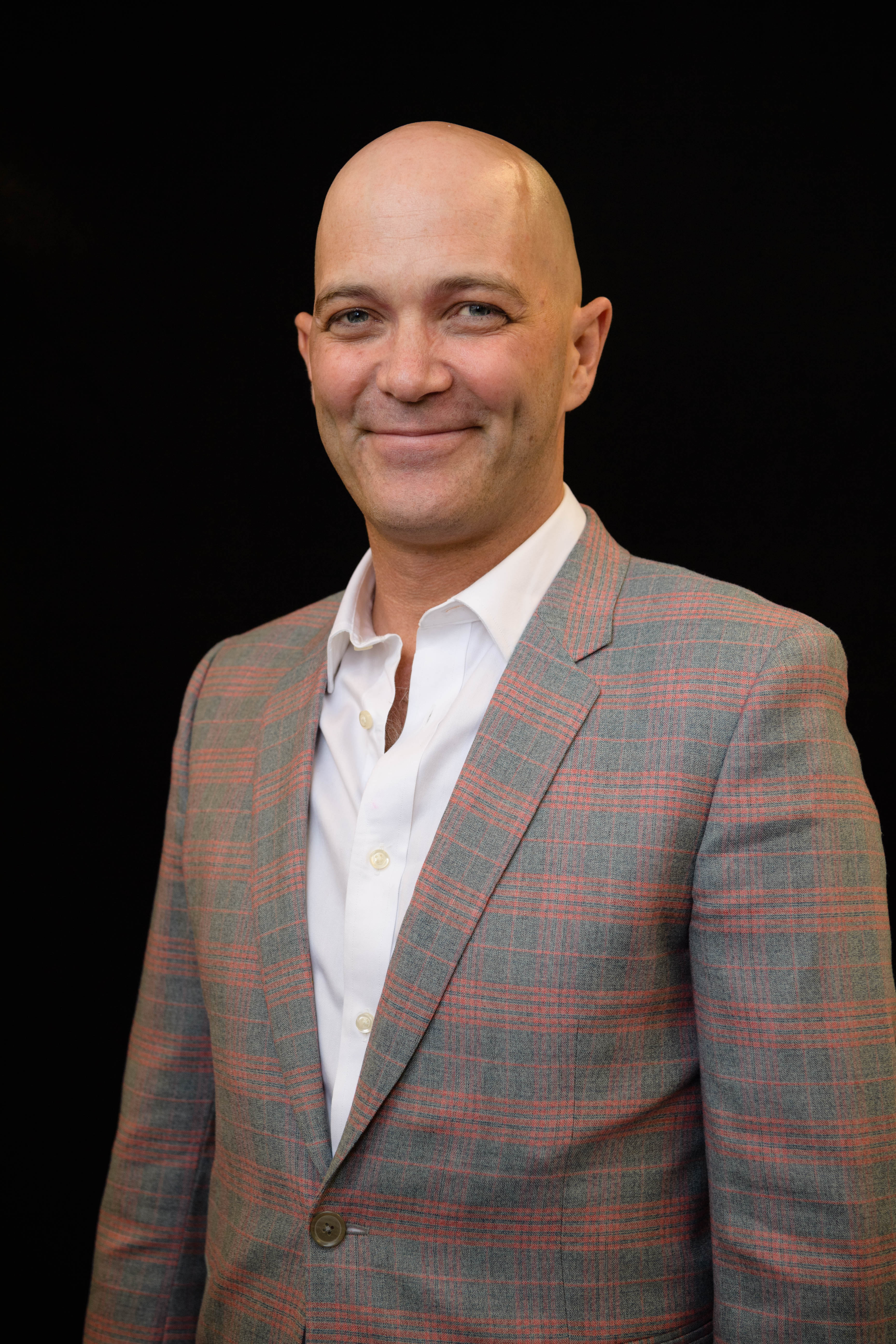
- Mac at the 2018 Montclair Film Festival

Background information
- Born: Taylor Mac Bowyer; August 24, 1973 (age 53); Laguna Beach, California, U.S.
- Genres: Cabaret, Pop, theater, musical theater
- Occupations: Singer-songwriter, drag queen, producer, director, writer, actor
- Instruments: Vocals, ukulele, piano
- Years active: 1994–present
- Website: taylormac.org

Taylor Mac Bowyer (born August 24, 1973) is an American actor, playwright, performance artist, director, producer, and singer-songwriter active mainly in New York City. In 2017, Mac was the recipient of a "Genius Grant" from the John D. and Catherine T. MacArthur Foundation. Mac was a finalist for the 2017 Pulitzer Prize for Drama.

== Early life ==
Mac was born Taylor Mac Bowyer in Laguna Beach, California and raised in Stockton, the child of Joy Aldrich and Vietnam War veteran Lt. Robert Mac Bowyer. Mac's mother opened a private art school that influenced Mac's early aesthetic by embracing collage and teaching students to build from mistakes rather than attempt to erase them. Mac moved to New York in 1994 to study at the American Academy of Dramatic Arts. After graduation, Mac began working as an actor and wrote the plays The Hot Month (1999), The Levee (2000), and The Face of Liberalism (2003).

== Career ==
Mac's work has been described as a fight against conformity and categorization. It draws on forms such as commedia dell'arte, contemporary musical theater, and drag performance, and Mac has noted Charles Ludlam, the Theater of the Ridiculous, and theatrical history reaching back to Greek theater as professional influences. Mac's work has been performed at New York City's Lincoln Center, the Public Theater, the Sydney Opera House, American Repertory Theatre, Stockholm's Södra Theatern, the Spoleto Festival, and many other venues both in the United States and internationally.

Mac is a self-described "fool" and "collagist" who puts together forms and costumes to create a complex and sometimes contradictory look and sound. Mac has resisted categorization by the press: after being described as Ziggy Stardust meets Tiny Tim, Mac created the show Comparison Is Violence, or the Ziggy Stardust Meets Tiny Tim Songbook.

Mac toured Europe with the plays The Be(A)st of Taylor Mac and The Young Ladies Of. Mac then developed The Lily's Revenge, combination of "camp extravaganza" and "comic self-deprecation" centered on the hero's journey of a lily that uproots itself to fight against nostalgia. The Lily's Revenge played at HERE Arts Center with Taylor Mac as the Lily.

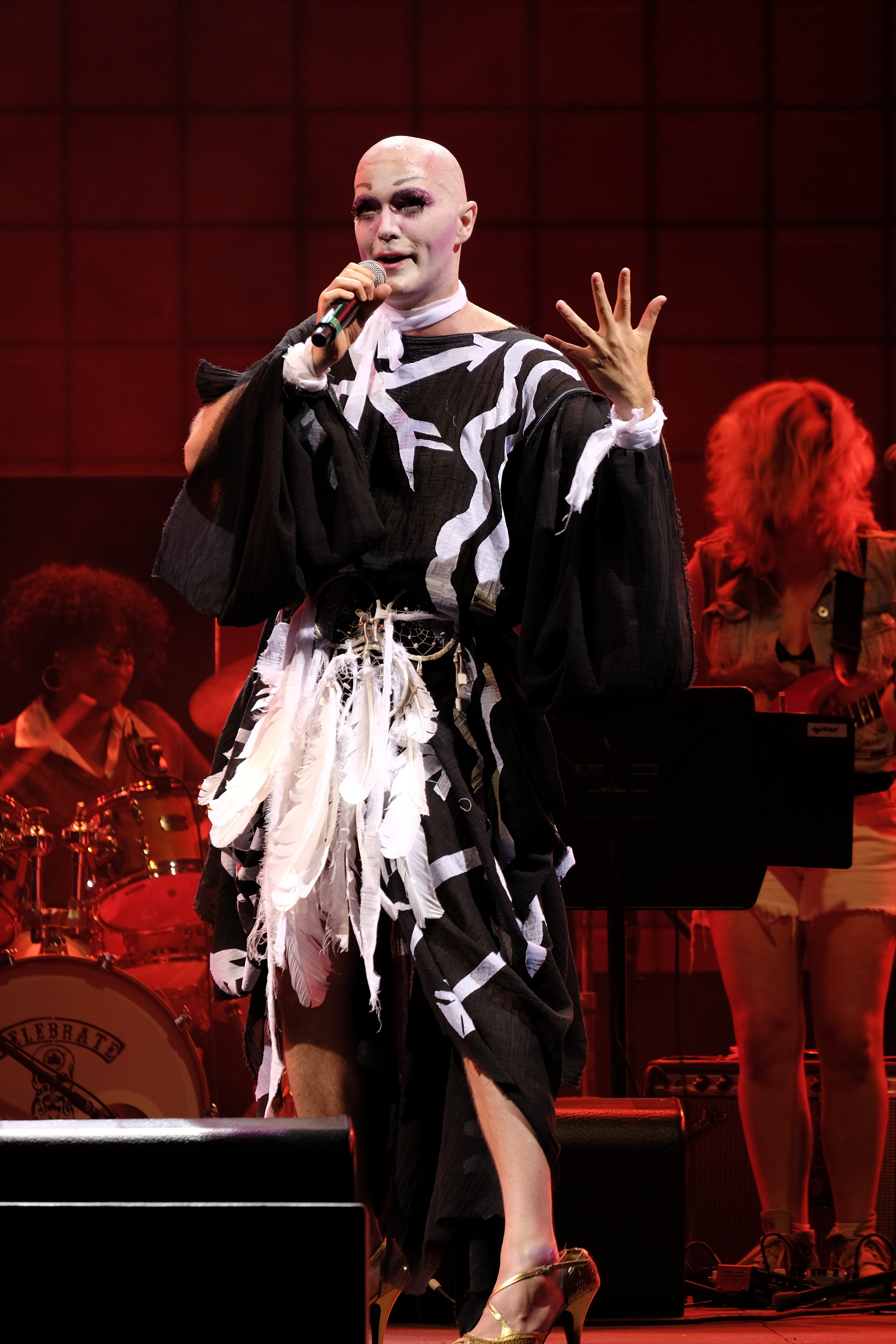
Mac performing at Celebrate Brooklyn! in 2015

In 2014, for Mac's performance in the Foundry Theater's production of Bertolt Brecht's Good Person of Szechwan, Mac was nominated for the Lucille Lortel Outstanding Lead Actor Award and the Drama League Distinguished Performance Award. Mac also starred in Classic Stage Company's A Midsummer Night's Dream.

Taylor Mac also created and hosted the political vaudeville Live Patriot Acts: Patriots Gone Wiiiiildd!, performed at the same time as the Republican National Convention in 2004.

Since at least 2012, Mac and musical director/arranger Matt Ray developed A 24-Decade History of Popular Music, a performance that covers music popular in the United States from 1776 to the 2016, with one hour dedicated to each decade with a corresponding costume designed by long-time collaborator Machine Dazzle. This work culminated in a 24-hour performance on October 8–9, 2016 with one hour dedicated to each decade. Wesley Morris of the New York Times said of the 24-hour concert, "Mr. Mac gave me one of the great experiences of my life. I've slept on it, and I'm sure. It wasn't simply the physical feat. Although, come on: 246 songs spanning 240 years for 24 straight hours, including small breaks for him to eat, hydrate and use the loo, and starting in 1776 with a great-big band and ending with Mac, alone in 2016, doing original songs on piano and ukulele." In 2017, the performance was a finalist for the Pulitzer Prize for Drama. It appeared fifth on a list by The Guardian writers of the best theatrical works since 2000. On October 29, 2018, in the run-up to the 2018 midterm elections, Taylor Mac performed a cover of Patti Smith's 'People Have the Power' after appearing as guest on The Late Show with Stephen Colbert.

In 2019, Mac's first Broadway play, Gary, A Sequel to Titus Andronicus, premiered April 11 starring Nathan Lane in the title role. The conceit is a look at who has to clean up all the dead bodies after the carnage of Shakespeare's play Titus Andronicus—in which almost everyone is murdered. The black comedy closed in June 2019 after both praising and panning reviews.

In 2020 during the COVID-19, Mac conceived of a socially distanced virtual show entitled Holiday Sauce … Pandemic!. Clad in Giuseppe Arcimboldo costume and inspired make up, Mac hosted a series of live and pre-recorded vignettes. The broadcast was filmed at the Park Avenue Armory and commissioned by the Norwegian Ministry of Culture and the National Theater of Oslo as part of the Ibsen Festival.

In 2022, Mac was featured in the book 50 Key Figures in Queer US Theatre, with a profile written by theatre scholar Sean F. Edgecomb.

== Personal life ==
Mac uses "judy" (lowercase) as a gender pronoun. According to a 2018 Washington Post profile, "Mac is fine with he." Mac has been influenced by the Radical Faeries and invokes "Radical Faerie realness ritual" during performances.

== Awards and residencies ==
- Tony Award Nominee for Best Play – Gary: A Sequel to Titus Andronicus (2019)
- Drama League Award (2019) for Unique Contribution to the Theatre
- MacArthur Genius Grant (2017)
- Finalist for Pulitzer Prize for Drama (2017)
- Special Citation Obie Award (2017)
- Edward M. Kennedy Prize for Drama Inspired by American History (2016)
- Guggenheim Award (2016)
- Doris Duke Award (2016)
- Mellon Foundation Playwright in Resident at Here Arts Center (2016–2019)
- Herb Alpert Award in the Arts (2015)
- Ethyl Eichelberger Award
- Peter Zeisler Memorial Award
- Helen Merrill Playwriting Award
- Sundance Theater Lab Residency (2-time winner)
- Rockefeller MAP Grant (3-time winner)
- Creative Capital Award
- New York State Council of The Arts Grant
- Massachusetts Council of the Arts Grant
- Edward Albee Foundation Residency
- The Franklin Furnace Grant
- Peter S. Reed Grant
- HERE Arts Center Resident Artist
- New Dramatists Resident Playwright
- New York Theatre Workshop Usual Suspect
- International Ibsen Award 2020

== Bibliography ==
- Dilating – A set of four one acts including Okay (a black comedy), Maurizio Pollini (the genre of "interlocked happening"), The Levee (a kitchen-sink drama), and A Crevice (an absurdist farce). All four of these one acts have the common theme of pregnancy.
- The Holy Virgin Mary of Our Time – with music by Edward Ficklin. Based on the true events surrounding the "sensation art exhibit at the Brooklyn Museum and "The Holy Virgin Mary" elephant dung controversy.
- Peace – co-written with Rachel Chavkin. A one act adaptation of the Aristophanes play of the same name.
- Mornings – a play about a man's attempt to perform his morning masturbation ritual. Originally written for the performance art play "Cardiac Arrest or venus on a Half-Clam" Now included in The Be(A)st of Taylor Mac.
- An Oblation
- The Dying Sentimentalist – commissioned by Arena Stage and premiered there in 2014 as a part of the "Our War" monologue collection about the Civil War.
- The Hot Month – produced by Boomerang Theatre Company in 2003 on Center Stage. Addresses issues of time and love in a story about a woman, her brother, and his lover.
- The Lily's Revenge – Created as part of HARP and premiered in the fall of 2009. Inspired by the arguments of tradition and nostalgia as an argument for discrimination and anti-gay marriage agendas. The music was composed by collaborator Rachelle Garniez.
- The Walk Across America for Mother Earth – a modern-day commedia dell'arte play about a group of anarchists protests against nuclear proliferation. Music by Ellen Maddow. Presented by La MaMa E.T.C. in association with the Talking Band in 2011.
- The Young Ladies Of – Based on letters written to Taylor's father after he placed an ad asking young ladies to write to him while he was stationed in Vietnam in 1968. Thousands replied to this ad. Combined with Taylor's own text, these letters create a conversation about patriarchy, war, romance, and fatherhood. Premiered at the HERE Arts Center.
- Red Tide Blooming – a musical celebration of freak-hood. Premiered at PS 122.
- Cardiac Arrest or Venus on a Half-Clam – written, performed, directed, and designed by Taylor Mac. Premiered at FEZ and subsequently headlined the Queer at HERE festival in 2004. Used Taylor's failing love life as a metaphor for the war on terror.
- The Be(A)st of Taylor Mac – premiered at the Edinburgh Festival Fringe in 2006 (produced by Paul Lucas) where it won a Herald Angel Award and performed in various venues in New York City. This piece of work explores the human condition and challenges the contemporary culture of fear through gender-bending surrealism.
- A 24-Decade History of Popular Music – Premiered at St. Ann's Warehouse in 2016, and subsequently toured around the world. Finalist for Pulitzer Prize for Drama.
- Mac's Dionysia Festival: four plays that are being premiered separately but will someday be premiered in an all day festival mirrored after the Greek Dionysia. All of these plays deal with our cultural polarization.
  - Part I: The Fre – about an intellectual aesthete who gets trapped in a mud pit. This is Taylor's first All-Ages play. The Fre is written in the form of old comedy. Commissioned by the Children's Theatre Company where it was also developed and will soon premiere.
  - Part II: Hir – a play about a dysfunctional family including a mad housewife, a transgender child, a son that spent three years in combat in Afghanistan, and a husband who had a stroke that left him nearly speechless. Produced by Playwrights Horizons in November 2015. Recognized among The New York Times top ten list for Best Theater of 2015.
  - Part III: The Bourgeois Oligarch – The story of a gauche philanthropist as he prepares his acceptance speech. Commissioned by The A.R.T. and will premiere soon as a collaboration with the Boston Ballet.
  - Part IV: Gary: A Sequel to Titus Andronicus – Set during the fall of the Roman Empire (400 CE), the years of bloody battles are over, the country has been stolen by madmen, and there are casualties everywhere. And two very lowly servants are charged with cleaning up the bodies.
