= Jeff Kushner =

American film editor

- Born: May 4, 1965 (age 60)
- Occupation: Film editor

Jeff Kushner (born May 4, 1965), who has also been credited as Jeffrey Kushner, Jeffrey A. Kushner and Russell Creak, is a film editor, supervising sound editor and educator who has worked in various post production positions since 1987. He also taught film history and sound design at the Los Angeles Film School between 2005 and 2008.

== Education ==
Kushner studied acting at the Royal Academy of Dramatic Art in 1982.

== Selected filmography ==
Kushner's editing and supervising sound credits include Sling Blade, Frogs for Snakes, Harold & Kumar Go to White Castle, Drowning Mona and I Hope They Serve Beer in Hell.

His dialogue, sound effects, ADR and/or Foley credits include the television shows Law & Order: Special Victims Unit, House, Crossing Jordan and 30 Rock. His feature credits include Unfaithful, Mystery Men, Behind Enemy Lines, and Agent Cody Banks.

Editor
Year	Film	Director	Notes
1998	Frogs for Snakes	Amos Poe	
1998	Strangeland	John Pieplow	
2009	I Hope They Serve Beer in Hell	Bob Gosse	Third collaboration with Bob Gosse

Editorial department
Year	Film	Director	Role	Notes
1997	Reflections of a Sensitive Man	Joe Vinciguerra	Editing services and support	
2000	Drowning Mona	Nick Gomez	Associate editor	Second collaboration with Nick Gomez

Actor
Year	Film	Director	Role
1994	Shatter Dead	Scooter McCrae	Patrolman

Additional crew
Year	Film	Director	Role
1990	Basket Case 2	Frank Henenlotter	Production assistant
1990	Frankenhooker	Frank Henenlotter	Production assistant

Sound department
Year	Film	Director	Role	Notes	Other notes
1989	The Unbelievable Truth	Hal Hartley	Boom operator		
1994	Spanking the Monkey	David O. Russell	Sound editor		
1994	Hand Gun	Whitney Ransick	Sound designer		
1994	The Last Good Time	Bob Balaban	Sound editor		
1995	Parallel Sons	John G. Young	Sound		
1995	Pharaoh's Army	Robby Henson	Supervising sound editor		
1996	Tromeo and Juliet	Lloyd Kaufman	Sound effects editor		
1996	Sling Blade	Billy Bob Thornton	Sound designer; Supervising sound editor		
1996	Illtown	Nick Gomez	Sound designer; Supervising sound editor	First collaboration with Nick Gomez	
1996	The Last Home Run	Bob Gosse	Sound designer; Supervising sound editor	First collaboration with Bob Gosse	
1997	Niagara, Niagara	Bob Gosse	Sound designer; Supervising sound editor	Second collaboration with Bob Gosse	
1997	Hudson River Blues	Neil Cox	Post-production sound		
1998	Frogs for Snakes	Amos Poe	Sound designer; Supervising sound editor		
1999	Speed of Life	Rob Schmidt	Foley artist; Sound designer; Supervising sound editor		
1999	Mystery Men	Kinka Usher	Dialogue editor		
1999	Deal of a Lifetime	Paul Levine	Dialogue editor		Uncredited
2000	Drowning Mona	Nick Gomez	Sound designer; Supervising sound editor		
2000	Boys and Girls	Robert Iscove	Sound effects editor		
2000	Just One Night	Alan Jacobs	Sound effects editor		
2000	Labor Pains	Tracy Alexson	Sound effects editor		
2001	Save the Last Dance	Thomas Carter	Sound effects editor		
2001	Carman: The Champion	Lee Stanley	Sound effects editorial		
2001	Killer Bud	Karl T. Hirsch	Sound effects editor		
2001	Cats & Dogs	Lawrence Guterman	Sound effects editor		
2001	Behind Enemy Lines	John Moore	Dialogue editor		
2002	High Crimes	Carl Franklin	Sound effects editor		
2002	Unfaithful	Adrian Lyne	Dialogue editor		
2003	Agent Cody Banks	Harald Zwart	Sound editor		
2003	The In-Laws	Andrew Fleming	Sound effects editor		
2004	Harold & Kumar Go to White Castle	Danny Leiner	Sound designer; Supervising sound editor	First collaboration with Danny Leiner	
2005	Nowhere Man	Tim McCann	Sound designer; Sound editor		
2005	The Great New Wonderful	Danny Leiner	Sound designer; Supervising sound editor	Second collaboration with Danny Leiner	
2009	Balls Out: Gary the Tennis Coach	Danny Leiner	Sound designer; Supervising sound editor	Third collaboration with Danny Leiner	
2009	I Hope They Serve Beer in Hell	Bob Gosse	Sound designer; Supervising sound editor		
2009	The Yankles	David R. Brooks	Sound designer; Supervising sound editor		
2010	A Marine Story	Ned Farr	Supervising sound editor		
2020	The Last Champion	Glenn Withrow	Dialogue editor; Sound editor		
2022	Double Down South	Tom Schulman	Dialogue editor		
2022	Shotgun Wedding	Jason Moore	ADR supervisor		

Thanks
Year	Film	Director	Role
2007	The Jinn	Iris Green	Special thanks

Direct-to-video films

Actor
Year	Film	Director	Role	Notes
2006	The Adventures of Brer Rabbit	Byron Vaughns	Ninja #2	Voice role

Documentaries

Sound department
Year	Film	Director	Role
2011	Vito	Jeffrey Schwarz	Sound designer: Supervising sound editor
2013	I Am Divine	Jeffrey Schwarz	Supervising sound editor

Thanks
Year	Film	Director	Role
2007	Spine Tingler! The William Castle Story	Jeffrey Schwarz	Special thanks

Shorts

Editor
Year	Film	Director
2001	Sluts & Losers	Sahara Lotti; Mark Racco

Thanks
Year	Film	Director	Role
2008	Stargazer	Jax Griffin	Very special thanks
2009	Attack at Zombie High!	Jennifer Sanett	Special thanks

TV movies

Sound department
Year	Film	Director	Role
2017	A Midsummer's Nightmare	Gary Fleder	Sound effects editor

TV series

Sound department
Year	Title	Role	Notes	Other notes
2005	Law & Order: Trial by Jury	Dialogue editor	3 episodes	
2005	Law & Order: Criminal Intent	Dialogue editor	2 episodes	
2005−06	House	Foley editor	4 episodes	
2006	Conviction	Dialogue editor	4 episodes	
2007	30 Rock	Foley editor	2 episodes	Uncredited
2005−07	Desperate Housewives	Foley editor	4 episodes	
2005−07	Law & Order	Dialogue editor	6 episodes	
2010	Psych	Sound editor	2 episodes	
2010	Warehouse 13	Sound editor	5 episodes	
2011	Fairly Legal	Supervising sound editor	1 episode	
2011	The Big C	Sound editor	3 episodes	Uncredited
2010−11	Eureka	Sound editor	4 episodes	
2012	House of Lies	Sound editor	3 episodes	
2015	Castle	Sound effects editor	1 episode	
2016	Secrets and Lies	Dialogue editor	9 episodes	
2016−17	New Girl	Dialogue editor	2 episodes	Uncredited
2017	Downward Dog	Sound effects editor	1 episode	
2017	Orange Is the New Black	Dialogue editor	1 episode	
2016−18	Designated Survivor	Dialogue editor	43 episodes	
2003−18	Law & Order: Special Victims Unit	Dialogue editor; Sound effects editor	105 episodes	
2018	Chicago P.D.	ADR editor	1 episode	
2018	Chicago Fire	ADR editor	2 episodes	
2019	Raising Dion	Supervising ADR editor	9 episodes	
2019	Get Shorty	Dialogue editor	7 episodes	
2019−20	The Chi	Dialogue editor	15 episodes	
2021	The Premise	Dialogue editor	1 episode	
2019−24	Young Sheldon	Dialogue editor; Foley editor	78 episodes	
