= The Film Collaborative =

American non-profit organization

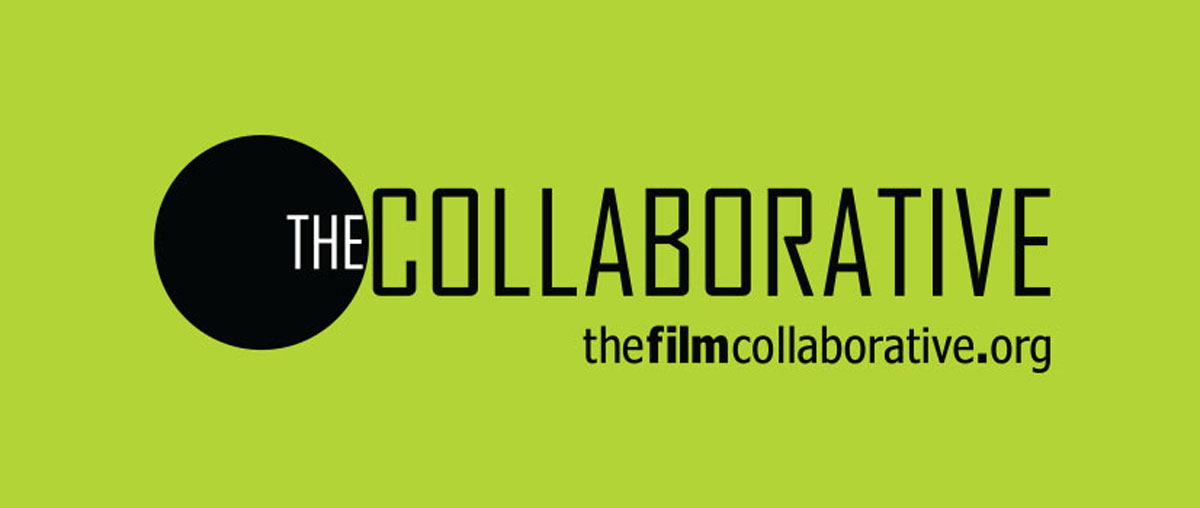
- Type: Nonprofit organization
- Industry: Film Distribution
- Founded: 2010
- Headquarters: Los Angeles, California, United States
- Products: Independent Film
- Website: thefilmcollaborative.org

The Film Collaborative (TFC) is an American non-profit organization. Based in Los Angeles, The Film Collaborative serves filmmakers worldwide by providing distribution guidance and support as well as theatrical, film festival and digital distribution of art house, independent and world cinema.

== History ==
Launched in 2010, The Film Collaborative is a service-oriented, educational organization aimed at encouraging and enabling independent filmmakers to forge their own brands and directly reach audiences with their work.

== Festival Distribution ==
In 2010, TFC did festival distribution for films such as Eyes Wide Open, The Owls, Florent, A Small Act, The Adults in the Room, How to Start Your Own Country, An African Election and Undertow.

TFC's 2011 slate included August, Codependent Lesbian Space Alien Seeks Same, Facing Mirrors, Hit So Hard, The Invisible War, I Want Your Love, Leave It on the Floor, Mosquita y Mari, Revenge of the Electric Car, Shut Up Little Man!, Some Guy Who Kills People, Vito, Weekend, We Were Here and The Wise Kids.

TFC's 2012 slate included A Fierce Green Fire, Interior. Leather Bar., Jobriath A.D., The New Black, A River Changes Course, Gayby, A Portrait of James Dean: Joshua Tree, 1951, Taking a Chance on God, Trans, United in Anger and Valley of Saints.

TFC's 2013 slate included I am Divine, Born This Way, G.B.F., Gore Vidal: The United States of Amnesia, The Happy Sad, Kink, Pit Stop and Valentine Road.

TFC's 2014 slate included Appropriate Behavior, Born to Fly, Boy Meets Girl, Cesar's Last Fast, Five Star, The Immortalists, Kidnapped For Christ, Out in the Night, Regarding Susan Sontag, Song From the Forest, (T)ERROR, To Be Takei and The Year We Thought About Love.

TFC's 2015 slate included All About E, All Eyes and Ears, The Amina Profile, The Armor of Light, The Bad Kids, The Hunting Ground, I Promise You Anarchy, Landfill Harmonic, Naz & Maalik, The New Man, Out to Win, Portrait of a Serial Monogamist, Racing Extinction, The Royal Road, Salero, Seed Money, Tab Hunter Confidential, Those People, Uncle Howard and While You Weren't Looking.

TFC's 2016 slate included AWOL, Boone, Cameraperson, Equal Means Equal, Forever Pure, Hooligan Sparrow, Hunky Dory, Icaros, Jewel's Catch One, The Last Laugh, Maya Angelou And Still I Rise, Out Run, A Song For You, Tower, Untouchable and Women Who Kill.

== Slate ==
Film	Year	Director	World premiere	Major awards	Distribution / Services	Genre	Notes
Hooligan Sparrow	2016	Nanfu Wang	Sundance	Best Social Impact Film, Documentary Feature (Greenwich International Film Festival), Spirit Award, Peabody Award	Festivals, theatrical	Documentary	
195 Lewis	2017	Chanelle Aponte Pearson	Rotterdam	U.S. Grand Jury Prize—Narrative Special Mention Film (Outfest)	Festivals	Episodic	
After Louie	2017	Vincent Gagliostro	BFI Flare		Festivals	Narrative	
All the Rage	2017	Michael Galinsky, David Beilinson, Suki Hawley	DOC NYC		Theatrical	Documentary	
A Bad Idea Gone Wrong	2017	Jason Headley			Festivals	Narrative	
Behind the Curtain: Todrick Hall	2017	Katherine Fairfax Wright	SXSW		Festivals	Documentary	
Bending the Arc	2017	Kief Davidson, Pedro Kos	Sundance	Best Documentary (Greenwich)	Festivals	Documentary	
The Death and Life of Marsha P. Johnson	2017	David France	Tribeca	2017 Programming Award for Freedom—David France and Victoria Cruz (Outfest)	Festivals	Documentary	
ELIÁN	2017	Tim Golden, Ross McDonnell	Tribeca		Festivals, Theatrical	Documentary	Gravitas
The Fabulous Allan Carr	2017	Jeffrey Schwarz	Seattle		Festivals	Documentary	
The Feels	2017	Jenée LaMarque	Seattle International	U.S. Narrative Jury Prize, Best Actress—Ever Mainard (Outfest)	Festivals	Narrative	
A Good American	2017	Friedrich Moser	CPH:DOX / DOC NYC		Theatrical	Documentary	
I Dream in Another Language	2017	Ernesto Contreras	Sundance	Audience Award: World Cinema Dramatic (Sundance)	Festivals	Documentary	FilmRise
Legion of Brothers	2017	Greg Barker	Sundance		Theatrical	Documentary	Gravitas
The Light of the Moon	2017	Jessica M. Thompson	SXSW	Audience Award, Narrative Feature (SXSW)	Festivals, theatrical	Narrative	
More Art Upstairs	2017	Jody Hassett Sanchez	Hot Docs		Sales	Documentary	
Motherland	2017	Ramona S. Diaz	Sundance	World Cinema Documentary Special Jury Award: Commanding Vision (Sundance)	Festivals, theatrical	Documentary	
No Man's Land	2017	David Byars	Tribeca		Festivals	Documentary	
The Opposition	2017	Hollie Fifer	IDFA		Festivals	Documentary	
Pornocracy	2017	Ovidie	SXSW		Festivals	Documentary	
Quest	2017	Jonathan Olshefski	Sundance	Grand Jury Prizes (Full Frame, RiverRun, Dallas, Ashland), Human Rights Award (Full Frame), Honorable Mention (Cleveland)	Festivals	Documentary	
The Reagan Show	2017	Pacho Velez, Sierra Pettengill	Tribeca		Theatrical	Documentary	Gravitas
Romeo Is Bleeding	2017	Jason Zeldes	San Francisco International	Winner of over 20 Film Festival Awards	Theatrical	Documentary	
Score	2017	Matt Schrader	Hamptons International	The Music Movies Award (Cleveland International)	Theatrical	Documentary	Gravitas
Signature Move	2017	Jennifer Reeder	SXSW	U.S. Grand Jury Prize—Best Narrative Feature Film: Jennifer Reeder (Outfest)	Festivals	Narrative	
Small Talk	2017	Hui-chen Huang	Golden Horse Film Festival, Berlinale	Teddy Award (Berlinale)	Festivals	Documentary	
A Suitable Girl	2017	Sarita Khurana, Smriti Mundhra	Tribeca	Albert Maysles New Documentary Director Award (Tribeca)	Festivals	Documentary	
Supergirl	2017	Jessie Auritt	Hamptons International		Festivals	Documentary	FilmRise
Sylvio	2017	Albert Birney, Kentucker Audley	SXSW		Sales	Narrative	
True Conviction	2017	Jamie Meltzer	Tribeca	Special Jury Mention, Best Documentary Feature (Tribeca)	Festivals	Documentary	
Unrest	2017	Jennifer Brea	Sundance	U.S. Documentary Special Jury Award: Editing (Sundance), Audience Award (RiverRun International), Grand Jury Prize (Nashville)	Festivals	Documentary	
The Untold Tales of Armistead Maupin	2017	Jennifer M. Kroot	SXSW	Audience Award Winner, Documentary Spotlight (SXSW), Best Documentary Jury Winner (Outshine Miami), Audience Award (Nashville)	Festivals, Theatrical, Sales, Digital	Documentary	
What Lies Upstream	2017	Cullen Hoback	Slamdance		Festivals	Documentary	
Women Who Kill	2017, 2016	Ingrid Jungermann	Tribeca	Best Screenplay (Outfest)	Theatrical, Festivals	Narrative	
1985	2018	Yen Tan	SXSW		Festivals	Narrative	
306 Hollywood	2018	Elan + Jonathan Bogarín	Sundance		Festivals	Documentary	
93Queen	2018	Paula Eiselt	HotDocs		Festivals	Documentary	
Angels Are Made of Light	2018	James Longley	TIFF		Festivals	Narrative	
Cherry Grove Stories	2018	Michael Fisher			Festivals	Narrative	
Crime + Punishment	2018	Stephen Maing	Sundance	U.S. Doc Special Jury Award For Social Impact Filmmaking (Sundance)	Festivals	Documentary	
The Devil We Know	2018	Stephanie Soechtig, Jeremy Seifert	Sundance	Best Call2Action Film (Boulder International)	Festivals	Documentary	
Do You Trust This Computer?	2018	Chris_Paine		IREN Audience Award	Festivals	Documentary	
Dykes, Camera, Action!	2018	Caroline Berler		Emerging Talent Award: Caroline Berler (Outfest)	Festivals	Documentary	
Edie Windsor: To A More Perfect Union	2018	Donna Zaccaro			Festivals	Documentary	
Terrence McNally: Every Act of Life	2018	Jeff Kaufman	Tribeca	Audience Award—Best Documentary (Out CT), Jury Award—Best Documentary (Out CT), Festival Award for Best Documentary (FilmOut San Diego), Programming Award: Freedom Award—Terrence McNally (Film Out San Diego)	Festivals, Sales	Documentary	
Freelancers Anonymous	2018	Sonia Sebastian			Festivals	Narrative	
Ideal Home	2018	Andrew Fleming			Festivals	Narrative	
Instructions on Parting	2018	Amy Jenkins		Best Documentary (Athens International Film + Video)	Festivals	Documentary	
The Judge	2018	Erika Cohn	Toronto	Audience Award (CUFF.Docs)	Festivals	Documentary	
Jules of Light and Dark	2018	Daniel Laabs			Festivals	Narrative	
Living Proof	2018	Matt Embry	Toronto	Audience Award, Best Alberta Feature (Calgary)	Festivals	Documentary	
Making Montgomery Clift	2018	Robert Clift, Hillary Demmon			Festivals, Sales	Documentary	
Man Made	2018	T Cooper		Best Documentary Jury Award (Atlanta), Best Documentary Feature (Translations: Seattle Transgender Film Festival), Best Documentary Feature Audience Award and Fox Inclusion Feature Award (Outfest)	Festivals	Documentary	
Mapplethorpe	2018	Ondi Timoner	Tribeca		Festivals	Narrative	
A Moment in the Reeds	2017	Mikko Makela	BFI London		Festivals, Digital, Sales	Narrative	
Punk Voyage	2018	Jukka Kärkkäinen, J-P Passi			Festivals, Digital	Documentary	
Rx: Early Detection	2018	Cathy Chermol Schrijver	Sundance		Festivals	Documentary	
Shakedown	2018	Leilah Weinraub	Berlin		Festivals	Documentary	
the T	2018	Deven Casey, Bea Cordelia, Daniel Kyri			Festivals	Episodic	
TransMilitary	2018	Gabriel Silverman, Fiona Dawson	SXSW	Audience Award, Documentary Competition (SXSW); Grand Jury Award (Florida Film Festival); Special Mention (Outfest)	Festivals	Documentary	
Tucked	2018	Jamie Patterson		Best Narrative Audience Award and International Narrative Feature Grand Jury Prize (Outfest)	Festivals	Documentary	
White Rabbit	2018	Daryl Wein	Sundance		Festivals	Narrative	
Wild Nights with Emily	2018	Madeleine Olnek	SXSW	Guggenheim Fellowship, U.S. In Progress Award (Champs- Elysees), Best Narrative Film and Best Screenplay (Q Films Long Beach), Audience Award Best Film (Shout Alabama), Jury Humanitarian Award (Honolulu Rainbow), Best Narrative Film (Out Here Now Kansas City), Best Narrative Feature (Tied- Tampa Bay International GLFF), Festival Favorite (Palm Springs LGBT), Best Actress- Molly Shannon- Jury Award (Out on film, Atlanta LGBT FF), Best Director (Runner-up)- Madeleine Olnek- Jury Award (Out on film, Atlanta LGBT FF)	Festivals, Sales	Narrative	
A Girl from Mogadishu	2019	Mary McGuckian	Edinburgh Int'l		Festivals, Global Impact VOD	Narrative	Showtime
Almost Love	2019	Mike Doyle	Inside Out Toronto, Frameline, Outfest		Festivals	Narrative	Vertical Entertainment / Netflix
Always in Season	2019	Jacqueline Olive	Sundance	U.S. Documentary Special Jury Award for Moral Urgency (Sundance)	Festivals, Community Conversations	Documentary	
Artifishal	2019	Josh "Bones" Murphy	Tribeca		Festivals	Documentary	
Buoyancy	2019	Rodd Rathjen	Berlin	Prize of the Ecumenical Jury – Panorama (Berlin)	Fiscal Sponsorship	Narrative	Kino Lorber
Carlos Almaraz	2019	Elsa Flores Almaraz, Richard Montoya	Palm Springs International		Fiscal Sponsorship	Documentary	Netflix
Changing the Game	2019	Michael Barnett	Tribeca	AT&T Audience Award—Best Documentary (Frameline43)	Festivals, Community Conversations	Documentary	Hulu
Drag Kids	2019	Megan Wennberg			Festivals	Documentary	Gravitas
The Euphoria of Being	2019	Réka Szabó	Locarno	Grand Prize of the Critics' Week (Locarno), Human Rights Award (Sarajevo)	Festivals	Documentary	
The Garden Left Behind	2019	Flavio Alves	SXSW	Audience Award—Visions (SXSW), Audience Award—Narrative Feature (Wicked Queer Boston), Audience Award for Best Feature Narrative (Translations), Best of the Fest (Bentonville), Best Drama Feature Jury Award (North Carolina Gay & Lesbian Film Festival), Best Supporting Performance—Miriam Cruz, Best Lead Performance—Carlie Guevara, and Best Director—Flavio Alves (North Louisiana Gay and Lesbian Film Festival), Grand Jury Prize—New Director's Feature (Nashville), Audience Award (Louisville LGBT), Richard Propes' Social Impact Award for Best Narrative Film (Heartland), QueerScope Prize (Hamburg LGBT)	Festivals	Narrative	Dark Star
Gay Chorus Deep South	2019	David Charles Rodrigues	Tribeca	GLAAD Media Award for Outstanding Documentary, Audience Award—Documentary (Tribeca), Audience Award for Best Documentary and Best Music Documentary (NorthwestFest), Audience Award—Best Documentary (Pink Apple Zurich)	Festivals	Documentary	MTV Films
He Dreams of Giants	2019	Keith Fulton, Lou Pepe	AFI FEST, DOC NYC	Best UK Feature (Raindance)	Festivals	Documentary	
Midnight Traveler	2019	Hassan Fazili	Sundance	World Cinema Documentary Special Jury Award for No Borders (Sundance), Special Mention, Panorama Jury Prize (Berlinale), Second Place, Panorama Audience Award (Berlinale), Special Mention, Peace Prize (Berlinale), Best International Feature (Doc Edge New Zealand), Best of Fest (Doc Edge New Zealand)	Festivals, Community Conversations	Documentary	Oscilloscope
Mr. Toilet	2019	Lily Zepeda	Hot Docs	Student Choice Awards (Hot Docs)	Festivals	Documentary	Journeyman
Our Time Machine	2019	Yang Sun, S. Leo Chiang	Tribeca	Best Cinematography—Documentary (Tribeca), Grand Jury Award—International Documentary Feature (Los Angeles Asian Pacific), Best Documentary (CAAMFest), Best International Director: S. Leo Chiang & Yang Sun (Doc Edge New Zealand), All In The Family (Doc Edge New Zealand), Jury Award for Best Documentary (Indie Street), Jury Award for Best Documentary (Pordenone Docs Fest)	Festivals	Documentary	Passion River
The River and the Wall	2019	Ben Masters	SXSW		Festivals, Community Conversations	Documentary	Gravitas
Test Pattern	2019	Shatara Michelle Ford		Best Female Lead Nominee, Best First Feature Nominee, Best First Screenplay Nominee (Film Independent Spirit Awards)	Fiscal Sponsorship	Narrative	Film Movement
Unsettled	2019	Tom Shepard	SFFILM	Audience Award for Documentary Feature (TLVFest), Grand Jury Award for Best Documentary (Outfest), Award of Excellence Special Mention: Documentary Feature, Award of Merit Special Mention: Cinematography, and Award of Excellence: LGBT (Impact Doc Awards)	Festivals	Documentary	
Vision Portraits	2019	Rodney Evans	SXSW	Outstanding Documentary Jury Award (Frameline43)	Festivals	Documentary	
Women, War & Peace II	2019	Eimhear O'Neill, Gini Reticker, Geeta Gandbhir, Sharmeen Obaid-Chinoy	PBS Series		Fiscal Sponsorship	Documentary	PBS
Ahead of the Curve	2020	Jen Rainin	Frameline, Outfest	Audience Award—Best Documentary (aGLIFF)	Festivals, Fiscal Sponsorship	Documentary	Wolfe
At the Ready	2020	Maisie Crow	Sundance		Festivals	Documentary	Gravitas
Breaking Fast	2020	Mike Mosallam	Cinequest		Festivals	Narrative	Vertical
Cicada	2020	Matthew Fifer	BFI London		Festivals	Narrative	Strand
Cured	2020	Bennett Singer, Patrick Sammon	Outfest	AT&T Audience Award: Best Documentary (Frameline44), Audience Award for Documentary Feature (Newfest)	Festivals, Community Conversations	Documentary	
Disclosure: Trans Lives on Screen	2020	Sam Feder	Sundance		Festivals	Documentary	Netflix
First Vote	2020	Yi Chen			Festivals, Community Conversations	Documentary	C35 Films
Kill Chain: The Cyber War on America's Elections	2020	Simon Ardizzone, Russell Michaels, Sarah Teale	HBO Max Original		Fiscal Sponsorship	Documentary	HBO
Landfall	2020	Cecilia Aldarondo	Tribeca	Nominee, Truer Than Fiction, Film Independent Spirit Awards 2021	Festivals, Community Conversations	Documentary	
Missing in Brooks County	2020	Lisa Molomot, Jeff Bemiss	Hot Springs Documentary		Festivals	Documentary	Giant Pictures
Mogul Mowgli	2020	Bassam Tariq	Berlin		Fiscal Sponsorship	Narrative	Strand
My Darling Vivian	2020	Matt Riddlehoover	SXSW		Festivals	Documentary	Giant Pictures
No Ordinary Man	2020	Aisling Chin-Yee, Chase Joynt	Toronto Int'l	Best Canadian Film (Inside Out Toronto)	Festivals	Documentary	Oscilloscope
On The Record	2020	Kirby Dick, Amy Ziering	Sundance		Festivals	Documentary	HBO
P.S. Burn This Letter Please	2020	Michael Seligman, Jennifer Tiexiera	Tribeca		Festivals	Documentary	Discovery+
Red Heaven	2020	Lauren DeFilippo, Katherine Gorringe	SXSW		Festivals	Documentary	Utopia
Rock Camp: The Movie	2020	Doug Blush	Cleveland Int'l		Festivals	Documentary	Gravitas
The Dilemma of Desire	2020	Maria Finitzo	SXSW		Festivals	Documentary	Utopia
The Magnitude of All Things	2020	Jennifer Abbott	Vancouver International, IDFA		Fiscal Sponsorship	Documentary	National Film Board of Canada
The New Corporation: The Unfortunately Unnecessary Sequel	2020	Joel Bakan, Jennifer Abbott	Toronto Int'l		Festivals	Documentary	
The Weight of Gold	2020	Brett Rapkin	HBO Max Original		Fiscal Sponsorship	Documentary	HBO
Through the Night	2020	Loira Limbal	Tribeca		Festivals, Community Conversations	Documentary	PBS
Welcome to Chechnya	2020	David France	Sundance	U.S. Documentary Special Jury Award for Editing: Tyler H. Walk (Sundance), Panorama Audience Award for Best Documentary (Berlin), Teddy ACTIVIST Award (Berlin)	Festivals	Documentary	HBO
White Noise	2020	Daniel Lombroso			Festivals, Community Conversations	Documentary	The Atlantic
Women in Blue	2020	Deirdre Fishel	Tribeca		Festivals, Community Conversations	Documentary	
18 1/2	2021	Dan Mirvish	Woodstock		Fiscal Sponsorship	Narrative	
2 Timers	2021	Tim Aslin, Shane Cibella	Pasadena Int'l		Fiscal Sponsorship	Narrative	
Bitterbrush	2021	Emelie Mahdavian	Teluride		Fiscal Sponsorship	Documentary	Magnolia Pictures
BOULEVARD! A Hollywood Story	2021	Jeffrey Schwarz	Outfest		Festivals, Sales	Documentary	Passion River
Building a Bridge	2021	Evan Mascagni, Shannon Post	Tribeca		Festivals	Documentary	AMC Plus Documentaries
End of the Line	2021	Shannon Kring	Sundance		Festivals	Documentary	
Firebird	2021	Peeter Rebane	BFI Flare		Festivals	Narrative	Lionsgate
Gemmel & Tim	2021	Michiel Thomas	Outfest		Festivals, Sales	Documentary	Passion River
It's Not a Burden	2021	Michelle Boyaner			Fiscal Sponsorship	Documentary	Gravitas
Like a Rolling Stone	2021	Suzanne Kai	Tribeca		Fiscal Sponsorship	Documentary	Netflix
Mission Joy	2021	Louie Psihoyos, Peggy Callahan	Tribeca		Festivals, Global Impact VOD	Documentary	Giant Pictures
My Name Is Lopez	2021	P. David Ebersole, Todd Hughes	AmDocs, Palm Springs Int'l		Fiscal Sponsorship	Documentary	Cinedigm
No Straight Lines	2021	Vivian Kleiman	Tribeca		Festivals	Documentary	
Not Going Quietly	2021	Nicholas Bruckman	SXSW	Audience Award Winner—Documentary Feature (SXSW); Special Jury Recognition—Humanity in Social Action, Documentary Feature (SXSW)	Festivals	Documentary	Greenwich Entertainment
Paul Dood's Deadly Lunch Break	2021	Nick Gillespie	SXSW	Final Draft Screenwriters Award (SXSW)	Festivals	Narrative	
See You Then	2021	Mari Walker	SXSW		Festivals	Narrative	Breaking Glass Pictures
Son of Monarchs	2021	Alexis Gambis	Sundance	Alfred P. Sloan Feature Film Prize (Sundance), Grand Jury Prize / New American Competition (Seattle International)	Festivals	Narrative	
Storm Lake	2021	Jerry Risius, Beth Levison	Full Frame		Festivals	Documentary	PBS
Swan Song	2021	Todd Stephens	SXSW		Festivals	Narrative	Magnolia
The Story of Looking	2021	Mark Cousins	Sheffield DOC/FEST	Closing Night (Sheffield)	Fiscal Sponsorship	Documentary	
Tigre Gente	2021	Elizabeth Unger	Tribeca		Festivals	Documentary	
Try Harder	2021	Debbie Lum	Sundance		Festivals	Documentary	Greenwich Entertainment

== Consultation Services ==
TFC offers distribution and marketing education to independent filmmakers.

== Fiscal Sponsorship ==
In 2012, TFC launched a Fiscal Sponsorship program, enabling filmmakers to contract with TFC to extend tax-exempt status to their specific projects, rather than attempting to secure tax-exempt status on their own.

== Collaborative Releasing ==
In late 2010, The Film Collaborative spearheaded the theatrical release of Javier Fuentes-León's ghostly love story Undertow (Contracorriente), which was Peru's Official Selection to the Academy Awards for Best Foreign Language Film that year. In 2012, they released Jonathan Lisecki's alternative parenting romantic comedy-drama Gayby and Aurora Guerrero's coming-of-age film Mosquita y Mari.

In 2014, The Film Collaborative's theatrical releases included Switzerland's Official Selection to the 2015 Academy Awards for Best Foreign Language Film, The Circle (Der Kreis), Born to Fly: Elizabeth Streb vs. Gravity, Catherine Gund's documentary about the life and work of choreographer and action architect Elizabeth Streb, LGBT film historiographer-director Jeffrey Schwarz's I am Divine, about the international drag superstar and John Waters' leading lady Divine, Darius Clark Monroe's Evolution of a Criminal and The Hand that Feeds.

In 2015, The Film Collaborative's theatrical releases included Jeffrey Schwarz's Tab Hunter Confidential, Lyric R. Cabral and David Felix Sutcliffe's (T)ERROR, which won the Special Jury Award for Breakout First Feature at the 2015 Sundance Film Festival. TFC also released Parvez Sharma's A Sinner in Mecca, Song from the Forest, and 1971, which focuses on a break-in of an FBI office that occurred that year in Media, Pennsylvania to steal over 1000 classified documents.

Requiem for the American Dream, featuring famed historian Noam Chomsky, began its release on January 29, 2016. TFC released Nanfu Wang's documentary about a Chinese activist, entitled Hooligan Sparrow, on July 22, 2016. The Film Collaborative, along with Emerging Pictures, will handle theatrical distribution for Landfill Harmonic (2016). The film will open theatrically in North America on September 9, 2016. TFC partnered with Gravitas Ventures to release For the Love of Spock theatrically on Sept. 9, 2016.

In November 2016, The Film Collaborative launched Collaborative Releasing as a new distribution initiative that combines film sales and licensing with a hybrid release plan. TFC also rebranded its Theatrical Releasing services under the Collaborative Releasing umbrella.

Collaborative Releasing handled the 2018 North American theatrical release of The Song of Sway Lake, directed by Ari Gold.

== Sales and Business Negotiation ==
In 2011, The Film Collaborative helped negotiate a deal for Andrew Haigh's Weekend. In 2012, TFC launched a new foreign sales initiative for LGBT titles with Peccadillo (UK), Outplay (France), Pro-Fun (Germany), ABC/Cinemien (Benelux) to share resources and launch films simultaneously in multiple territories when possible to maximize awareness and limit piracy. In 2016, The Film Collaborative was a key player in orchestrating a splits right deal for the film Landfill Harmonic involving Vimeo (Digital), HBO Latino (Television), Tugg (Educational) and FilmRise (DVD).
