= Tab Hunter Confidential =

2015 film directed by Jeffrey Schwarz

- Film Poster
- Directed by: Jeffrey Schwarz
- Based on: Tab Hunter Confidential: The Making of a Movie Star by Tab Hunter and Eddie Muller
- Produced by: Allan Glaser
- Starring: Tab Hunter; Debbie Reynolds; Robert Wagner; John Waters; George Takei; Clint Eastwood; Portia de Rossi
- Cinematography: Nancy Schreiber
- Edited by: Jeffrey Schwarz
- Music by: Michael Cudahy
- Production company: Allan Glaser Productions Automat Pictures
- Distributed by: The Film Collaborative
- Release date: March 15, 2015
- Running time: 90 minutes
- Country: United States
- Language: English

Tab Hunter Confidential is a 2015 American documentary film focusing on the American actor, singer, and author Tab Hunter. It is inspired by his autobiography of the same name. The film was produced by Allan Glaser and directed by Jeffrey Schwarz.

The film features extensive interviews with Hunter, as well as contemporaries and associates, including John Waters, Clint Eastwood, Debbie Reynolds, and more.

== Background ==
In 2005, Hunter's autobiography, Tab Hunter Confidential: The Making of a Movie Star, co-written with Eddie Muller, became a New York Times best-seller, and again topped the charts when it was released in paperback in 2007, as well as in 2015, following the release of the documentary. The book served as Hunter's first person account of his rise to Hollywood heartthrob status in the 1950s, as well as his personal struggle with revealing his sexuality over the course of his career.

Acknowledging he was gay in the book, the tone set a new precedent for discussion of Hollywood's golden era.

Following Hunter's participation in Jeffrey Schwarz's documentary I Am Divine (about Baltimore drag queen Divine, with whom Hunter had appeared in several motion pictures), producer Allan Glaser approached Schwarz about the potential of adapting the Confidential book into a feature-length documentary.

Filming began in 2011 conducting a series of new interviews with Hunter and associates in Los Angeles, New York, Paris and Santa Barbara, as well as culling archival footage of figures from Hollywood's past discussing the star. Filming was completed in 2015.

== Release ==
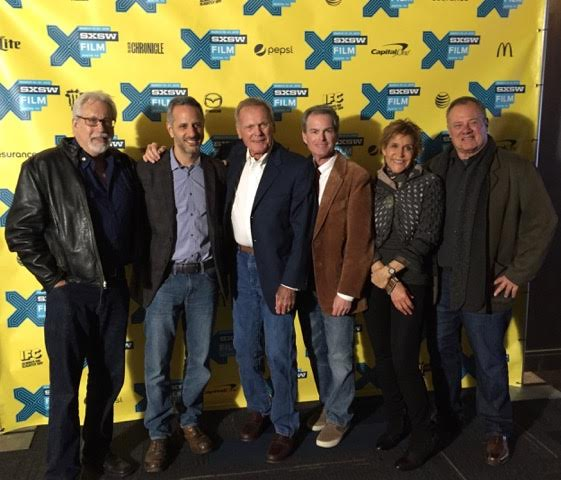
Production Team behind Tab Hunter Confidential

Tab Hunter Confidential premiered at South by Southwest (SXSW) in 2015, and played over 100 film festivals and independent screenings.

The film was also given a theatrical release in October 2015, premiering in New York at The Village East and in Los Angeles at the Nuart Theater, playing theatrically in over 50 cities.

== Participants ==
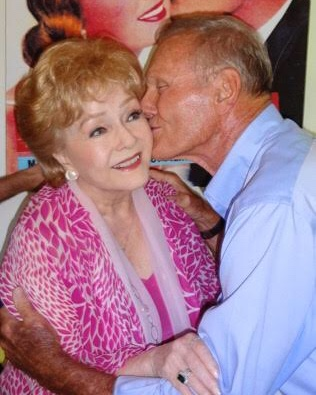
Tab Hunter and Debbie Reynolds on the set of Tab Hunter Confidential

- Tab Hunter
- Clint Eastwood
- Debbie Reynolds
- Portia De Rossi
- Noah Wyle
- George Takei
- Robert Wagner
- Dolores Hart
- Lainie Kazan
- John Waters
- Connie Stevens
- Marilyn Erskine
- Allan Glaser
- Terry Moore
- Liz Torres
- Robert Osborne
- Don Murray
- Darryl Hickman
- Rae Allen
- Rex Reed
- Shannon Bolin
- Rona Barrett
- Eddie Muller
- Gary Giddins
- Neal Noorlag
- Tamara Asseyev
- Etchika Choureau
- Earl Holliman

=== Archive footage ===
- Natalie Wood
- Paul Newman
- James Dean
- Rock Hudson
- Anthony Perkins
- Perry Como
- Steve Allen
- Pat Boone
- Art Linkletter

== Reception and awards ==
Receiving favorable reviews from critics, Tab Hunter Confidential has been praised for its portrait not only of Hunter, but of Hollywood during the actor's heyday. Vanity Fair called it “A savvy, rollicking, eye-popping film. Brave for its candor and enlightening for the social context it provides,” while IndieWire posited that the film was “fun and gossipy in the way that great documentaries about Hollywood often are, but it also speaks to a deeper truth about identity and perseverance and the large divide between one's personal and professional life.”

The film has been nominated and won a multitude of awards, including the Best Documentary at the California Independent Film Festival, the Audience and Festival Awards for Best Documentary at FilmOut San Diego, Best Feature at the Louisville LGBT Film Festival, and the Audience Award for Best Documentary at the Miami Gay and Lesbian Film Festival. Tab Hunter Confidential was also short listed for consideration for Best Documentary for the 2015 Academy Awards.

In January 2016, Tab Hunter Confidential was nominated for "Outstanding Documentary" at the 27th GLAAD Media Awards.

Group	Year (Note: Indicates the year of ceremony. Each year is linked to the article about the awards held that year, wherever possible.)	Category	Recipient	Result	Ref
Cleveland International Film Festival	2015	Best Documentary	Jeffrey Schwarz	Nominated	
Cleveland International Film Festival	2015	Documentary Competition - Best Documentary	Jeffrey Schwarz	Nominated	
California Independent Film Festival	2015	Slate Award - Best Documentary	Jeffrey Schwarz	Won	
California Independent Film Festival	2015	Golden Slate Award - Best Documentary	Allan Glaser, Neil Koenigsberg	Won	
FilmOut San Diego	2015	FilmOut Audience Awards - Best Documentary	Allan Glaser, Neil Koenigsberg	Won	
FilmOut San Diego	2015	FilmOut Festival Award - Best Documentary	Allan Glaser, Neil Koenigsberg	Won	
Louisville LGBT Film Festival	2015	Audience Award - Best Feature	Allan Glaser, Neil Koenigsberg	Won	
Key West Film Festival	2015	Jury Prize - Best LGBT Film	Jeffrey Schwarz	Won	
Miami Gay and Lesbian Film Festival	2015	Audience Award - Favorite Documentary	Allan Glaser	Won	
Miami Gay and Lesbian Film Festival	2015	Jury Award - Best Documentary	Allan Glaser	Nominated	
GLAAD Media Awards	27th / 2016	Outstanding Documentary	Jeffrey Schwarz, Allan Glaser, Neil Koenigsberg	Nominated	
