= Elle Schneider =

American filmmaker, camera developer (born 1985)

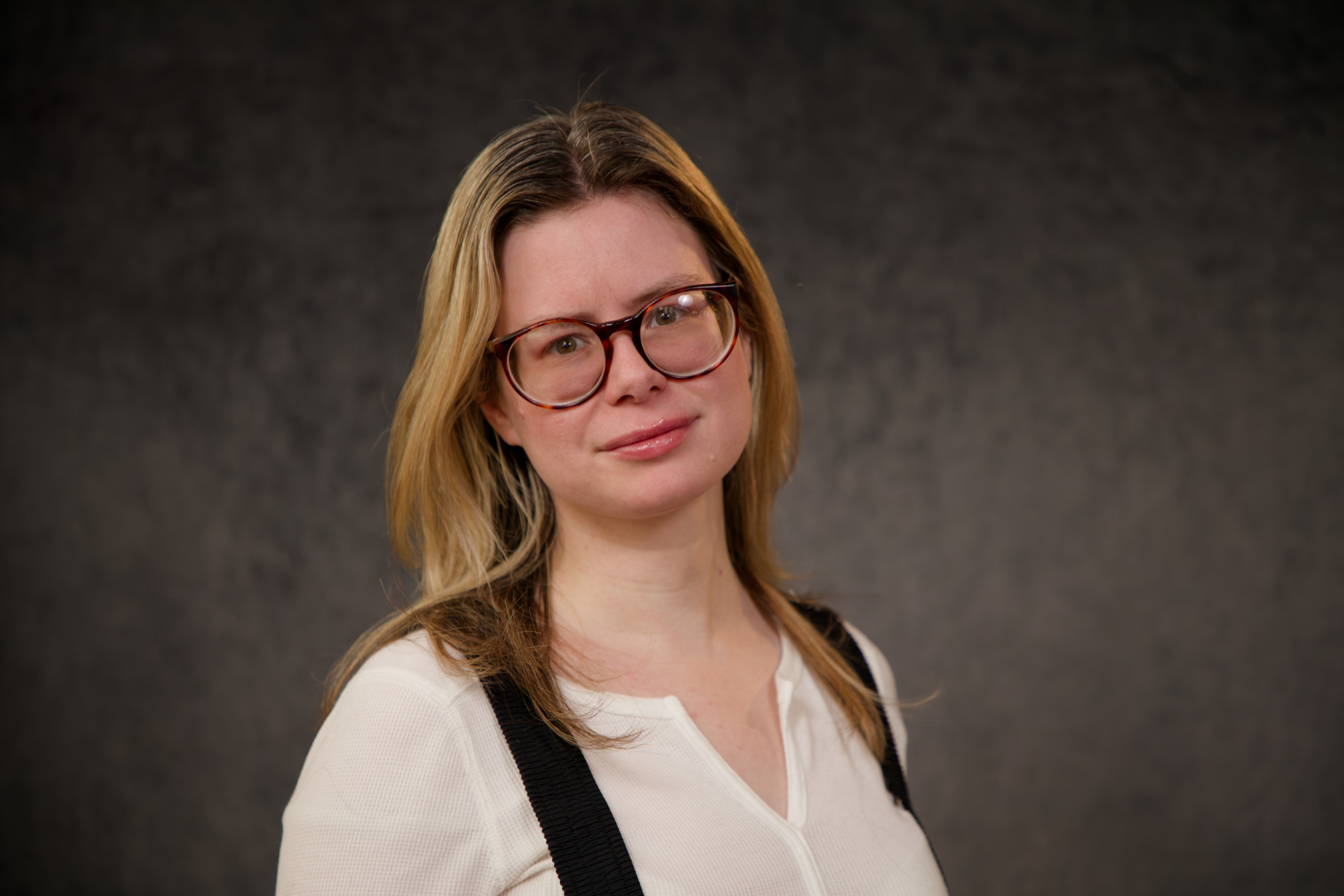
- Born: November 11, 1985 (age 40)
- Education: USC School of Cinematic Arts
- Occupations: Filmmaker, cinematographer
- Website: https://elleschneider.com

Elle Schneider (born November 11, 1985) is an American filmmaker and camera developer, best known as co-producer and director of photography on the 2014 documentary That Guy Dick Miller, and for her work creating the Digital Bolex cinema camera.

== Brief biography ==
Schneider, originally from New York City, is a 2008 graduate of the University of Southern California School of Cinematic Arts. She was a screenwriting major with a minor in the USC Interactive Media & Games Division. After graduation she worked as a game producer and user interface designer for online math and science games.

== Digital Bolex ==
Schneider was originally hired to direct promotional material for the Digital Bolex cinema camera in summer of 2011. During development of the camera, she became involved in the user interface design and physical attributes of the camera, including the digital crank. After the launch of the camera at the 2012 SXSW Film Festival, she became the creative director (CCO) and co-owner of the company. In 2012, Schneider was a speaker at Massachusetts Institute of Technology's #HackingArts Conference.

== Career ==
Schneider has worked as a writer, director, and first and second unit cinematographer, mostly on short films and documentaries. She was one of several cinematographers on Jeffrey Schwarz's documentary feature I Am Divine, which premiered at the 2013 SXSW Film Festival. She was co-producer and director of photographer of 2014 film That Guy Dick Miller, which also premiered at SXSW. Schneider also shot segments of Return to Nuke 'Em High Volume 1.

Short films Schneider has directed have played at festivals including the HollyShorts Film Festival, the San Diego Film Festival, the San Antonio Film Festival, and the Short Film Corner at the Cannes Film Festival. She has also directed commercials promoting her own Digital Bolex company, and the music video for "Keep Talking" by Brooklyn band Gangstagrass, the song used as the theme song for the television series Justified; the video features Joelle Carter, a lead actress on Justified, and was shot on the set of the show.

Schneider co-wrote the story, later adapted by writers at JumpStart Studios, for the first season of the web series Video Game High School. As of 2014, the series had earned more than 10 million views per episode.

=== Activism ===
In 2012, Schneider identified a lack of opportunities for women cinematographers and directors in her press interviews about Digital Bolex; In 2014, she announced that Digital Bolex started a loan program for two of its cameras, to be used by film productions led by female cinematographers. She further discussed discrimination of women cinematographers in the June 2014 issue of MovieMaker.

=== Photography ===
Schneider has been exhibited a number of times as a photographer, including a show in Los Angeles and one in Milan. Schneider was the second unit cinematographer and promotional photographer for Geek & Sundry web series Caper, which premiered on Hulu in 2014; her cast photos appeared in the Los Angeles Times and io9.
