= The Fabulous Allan Carr =

- Film poster
- Directed by: Jeffrey Schwarz
- Produced by: John Boccardo; Jeffrey Schwarz
- Starring: Allan Carr
- Cinematography: Jeff Byrd; Matt May; Keith Walker
- Edited by: Carl Pfirman; Jeffrey Schwarz
- Music by: Michael Cudahy
- Production company: Automat Pictures
- Release date: May 19, 2017
- Running time: 90 minutes
- Country: United States
- Language: English

The Fabulous Allan Carr is a 2017 American documentary film from filmmaker Jeffrey Schwarz. The film details the story of Hollywood producer Allan Carr, famous for producing Grease, Can't Stop the Music, La Cage aux Folles, and the 1989 Academy Awards. The film made its debut at the 2017 Seattle International Film Festival (SIFF).

== Production ==
Featuring interviews and archival footage with friends and confidantes of the flamboyant producer, Allan Carr, early reviews marked The Fabulous Allan Carr as a reverent portrait of one of Hollywood's elite, highlighting the fact that Carr "changed the face of pop and gay culture."

The film features interviews with Patricia Birch, Maxwell Caulfield, Steve Guttenberg, Randy Jones, Randal Kleiser, Sherry Lansing, Lorna Luft, Michael Musto, Robert Osborne, Brett Ratner, Connie Stevens, Alana Stewart, Marlo Thomas, Bruce Vilanch and more.

== Released ==
The film made its debut at the SIFF Cinema Egyptian as a part of 2017 Seattle International Film Festival (SIFF).
