= David Del Valle =

American journalist, columnist and film historian (1949–2026)

- Born: Ronald David Del Valle; September 24, 1949; El Paso, Texas, U.S.
- Died: November 4, 2026 (aged 77); Burbank, California, U.S.
- Education: San Francisco State University
- Occupations: Journalist; columnist; film historian; commentator

Ronald David Del Valle (September 24, 1949 – November 4, 2026) was an American journalist, columnist, film historian, and radio and television commentator on horror, science-fiction, cult and fantasy films. Described by Entertainment Weekly as "Something of a cult celebrity himself," he was inducted into the Rondo Hatton Classic Horror Awards' Monster Kid Hall of Fame in 2016.

== Early life and education ==
Del Valle began his love of horror movies early, beginning "when I was four, or five, or six years old. So the first movies I saw were the Universal horror films, with Lon Chaney Jr. as the Mummy, and Bela Lugosi as Dracula. And then I started watching the films of Vincent Price, especially at the drive-in, when I was in high school, because that’s what they showed, nothing but triple-feature horror movies. So as a kid, that was what I watched, as an escape from school…. And I’m sure my story resonates with a lot of people, because you start out with that genre when you’re a little boy. That’s the way that works."

He attended San Francisco State University.

== Career ==
Del Valle began contributing articles on horror and classic Hollywood movies to magazines including Video Watchdog, Cinefantastique, Scarlet Street, Diabolique, Kinoeye, Little Shoppe of Horrors, and the UK's Films and Filming, plus the website RealScreen.com. From 2000 to 2016, Del Valle wrote a web column on film history, Camp David, for the magazine Films in Review.

He additionally produced and hosted a series of cable TV interviews entitled Sinister Image. His guests included actor Cameron Mitchell and directors Russ Meyer and Curtis Harrington. A compilation was released on home video as Cult People (1990), and the audio of Del Valle's 1987 Sinister Image on-camera interview with Vincent Price later appeared on the 2013 Shout Factory DVD/Blu-ray set The Vincent Price Collection. He also hosted and curated the Full Moon Features streaming series Haunted Hollywood in 2020. He was a producer and the onscreen interviewer of Vincent Price on the 1994 documentary Vincent Price: My Life and Crimes.

Del Valle began doing audio commentary on movie home video releases in 1983, and had continued to do them into the 2020s. (See "Audio commentary" below).

He curated the 2006 Los Angeles, California photo exhibit Nevermore, devoted to the Edgar Allan Poe films of Vincent Price and Roger Corman. Additionally, he had worked as a Hollywood talent agent, had done small, sometimes uncredited roles in low-budget films, and was casting director of the 1987 horror anthology film The Offspring aka From a Whisper to a Scream.

== Death ==
Del Valle died from esophageal cancer in Burbank, California, on November 4, 2026, at the age of 77.

== Audio commentary ==
Del Valle contributed audio commentary to the DVD/Blu-ray releases of films including for the Criterion Collection:

- Connecting Rooms,
- The Count Yorga Collection (with C. Courtney Joyner)
- She Done Him Wrong,
- The Web,

Synapse Films:

- Suspiria,

Kino Lorber:

- The Amazing Transparent Man
- The Female Animal
- The Perfect Furlough,

Gypsy Wildcat

Twilight Time:

- The Hound of the Baskervilles

== Bibliography ==
- Del Valle, David (2010). Lost Horizons Beneath the Hollywood Sign. Albany, Georgia, USA: BearManor Media. ISBN 978-1593936075.
- Del Valle, David (2012). Six Reels Under. Albany, Georgia, USA: BearManor Media. ISBN 978-1-593-93696-9.

== Filmography ==
- It Conquered Hollywood! The Story of American International Pictures (2001; interviewee; one-hour documentary for American Movie Classics (AMC)
- The Many Lives of Jason Voorhees (2002; interviewee; half-hour documentary)
- Spine Tingler! The William Castle Story (2007; interviewee; feature documentary)
- Skin: A History of Nudity in the Movies (2020; interviewee; feature documentary)
- The Vincent Price Legacy (2025; interviewee; feature documentary)
- Mineshaft: The Cruising Murders (2026; interviewee; feature documentary)
