= Mineshaft (disambiguation) =

Mineshaft may refer to:

- A long vertical tunnel giving access to a mine's workings, see shaft mining
- Mineshaft (gay club), a BDSM-oriented gay sex club in New York City, which operated from 1976 to 1985
- Mineshaft (horse), an American thoroughbred racehorse and successful stallion
- Mineshaft (magazine), an independent international art magazine, started in 1999
- Mineshaft gap
- Mineshaft: The Cruising Murders, a 2026 American documentary film
- Gemeinschaft
