= Los Angeles Film School =

American for-profit college

The Los Angeles Film School
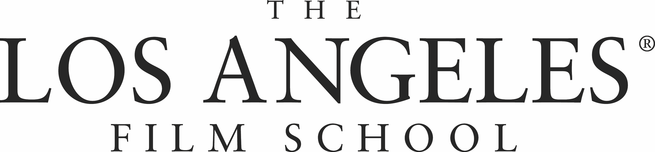
- Motto: Pursue Your Passion
- Type: For-profit college, film school
- Established: 1999
- Students: 5,833 (2025)
- Location: 6363 Sunset Boulevard; Hollywood, California; 90028; 34.09882°N 118.32820°W
- Campus: Urban
- Website: www.lafilm.edu

The Los Angeles Film School (LAFS and, informally, LA Film School) is a private for-profit college in Los Angeles, California, United States. It was founded in 1999 and is accredited by the Accrediting Commission of Career Schools and Colleges (ACCSC). The school encompasses the Los Angeles Recording School and offers associate and bachelor's degrees in entertainment industry fields that are taught by experienced practitioners.

== History ==
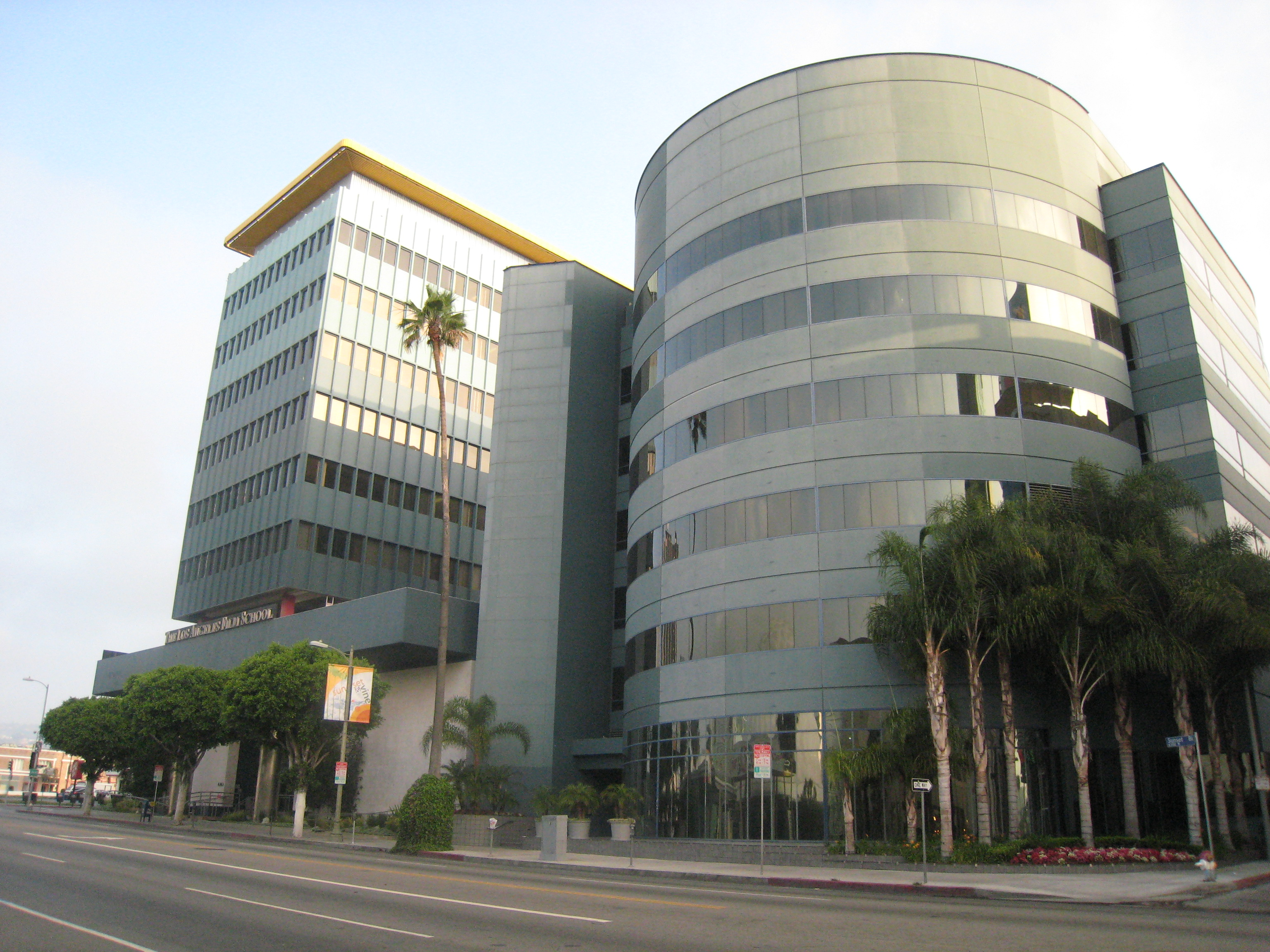
Main Sunset Boulevard building of the Los Angeles Film School

The Los Angeles Film School was founded in 1999. The school was conceived and founded by married investors Paul Kessler, a financier, and Diana Derycz-Kessler, a lawyer and entrepreneur, together with former Universal President and two-term Producers Guild president, Thom Mount, who via his own production company produced Bull Durham, Tequila Sunrise, Frantic, Natural Born Killers, and Can't Buy Me Love, along with venture capitalist Bud MaLette. and venture capitalist Bud MaLette. In 1998, the founders developed the idea for the school and made an initial investment of $2 million.

The first classes began in September 1999 and the school's first students graduated in July 2000. The founding faculty included Tom Schatz, professor of film, William A. Fraker and Janusz Kamiński teaching cinematography, Jon Amiel and Donald Petrie teaching directing, Dede Allen teaching editing, Ron Judkins teaching sound production, and Joe Byron, Director of Technology.

The school was originally funded by Kessler and Derycz-Kessler through their company Bristol Investments. After 18 months, the couple bought out their partners in the school and Dercyz-Kessler became the CEO, seeking to address overspending in a more active role. The total investment in the school had grown to $15 million by 2001, including the installation of the professional equipment required for film production. As of 2001, students at the school had created 700 short films. The total number of students was 150 full-time and approximately 30 part-time.

In 2003, the school formed a partnership with several private equity investors. In April 2011, a decision was made by ACCET to withdraw its accreditation of The Los Angeles Recording School. The decision was stayed on appeal, and the school was permitted to resign its accreditation amicably, following the transfer of remaining students to The Los Angeles Film School, which is accredited by the ACCSC.

In February 2010, employees of The Los Angeles Film School submitted authorization cards to the National Labor Relations Board in an effort to become unionized as part of the California Federation of Teachers. Following the controversial firing of a The Los Angeles Film School employee and union organizer, and the litigation which led to her reinstatement, the group withdrew its petition for unionization. In July 2011, the school settled a dispute with a local farmers market, which regularly blocked access to a The Los Angeles Film School parking garage.

By 2011, the school's enrollment had grown to 1,800 students. Derycz-Kessler had a 17-year tenure as CEO (from 2000 to July 2017).

=== Lawsuits ===
The Los Angeles Film School and Los Angeles Recording School faced a class action lawsuit in 2010, due to the school allegedly using deceptive tactics in promising students jobs in the entertainment industry. The complaint stated that the school allegedly failed to give them their 900 hours of instruction, and would allegedly attempt to bribe students with gift cards to Target and Best Buy if they would sign self-employment forms misrepresenting sales clerk positions at the Apple Store and Guitar Center as "Creative positions".

In 2024, former admissions VP Ben Chaib, together with Dave Phillips, former VP of career development, filed a whistleblower suit, alleging that most of the school's annual federal student aid program funding is acquired by its fraudulent misrepresentations, perpetrated to appear to meet its post-graduate employment accreditation benchmark, though "the vast majority of LAFS graduates were not able to obtain entry level positions", according to the suit. Sister school Full Sail University was also named in the lawsuit. The lawsuit was dismissed and Chaib's and Phillips' attorney was fined in the verdict ruled on Friday October 23, 2026 by Judge Stanley Blumenfeld.

== Campus ==
The Los Angeles Film School, located on Sunset Boulevard in the Los Angeles neighborhood of Hollywood, housing a quarter-million square foot campus (23,000 m^{2}) includes the historic RCA Building, which is known for being a recording place of artists, including Elvis Presley, the Rolling Stones and Henry Mancini.

The school has preserved the historic RCA Studio 2 echo chambers that were used on so many of the label artists recordings, many of which became big hits.

In 2001, the school opened a 345-seat, THX-certified theater featuring a DCI-compliant Christie digital cinema projector with a Dolby decoder. In 2006, the nearby six-story Klasky Csupo studio building (originally built in 1985 for a Mercedes-Benz dealership) was purchased, which brought the total area of the campus to 230,000 square feet (21,000 m^{2}). The campus also includes a 4,000 square feet (370 m^{2}) sound stage and the 8,000 square feet (740 m^{2}) Ivar Theater.

The school's main stage houses a 3,000 square feet (280 m^{2}) set of a Victorian house, where students can produce student films and television shows with industry professionals. The school also includes a backlot located off of Selma Avenue. Students receive hands-on training using groundbreaking technology from industry leaders like Avid, Sony, Arri, Wacom, SSL, and Neve.

== Campus history ==
From April 1964 through 1977, RCA Victor's "Studio C Hollywood" operated out of the current The Los Angeles Film School location, 6363 Sunset Blvd.

Notable recordings made at this location at this include:

- Elvis Presley's "Burning Love," "Separate Ways," "Always on My Mind," and "T-R-O-U-B-L-E" singles as well as his final studio-recorded album, Today. In 2025, the five-disc compilation "Sunset Boulevard" was released, featuring live rehearsal recordings and rarities of Elvis at Studio C between 1970 and 1975.
- Sam Cooke's Night Beat album which featured the singles "You Gotta Move," Shake, Rattle, and Roll," "Nobody Knows the Trouble I've Seen," and "Mean Old World" was recorded at 6363 Sunset Blvd.
- The Rolling Stones' first album to be recorded entirely in the United States, Aftermath, featured "Under My Thumb," "Mother's Little Helper," and "Lady Jane." The track "19th Nervous Breakdown" and the final version of "(I Can't Get No) Satisfaction" were also recorded at this location.
- Other artists who recorded at 6363 Sunset Blvd included: Astrud Gilberto, Harry Nilsson, Jefferson Airplane, The Monkees.

=== The Ivar Theater ===
The Ivar Theater has been used as a filming location for films like Loving You starring Elvis Presley and The Big Lebowski directed by Joel and Ethan Coen, starring Jeff Bridges.

It has also been used for live theater and musical performances from artists like the Grateful Dead.

=== Klasky Csupo Studios ===
In the late 1990s, The Los Angeles Film School's Building B was also home to animation house Klasky Csupo, the creators of Rugrats, The Wild Thornberrys, Duckman, and animators for the first four seasons of The Simpsons. Graffiti of various Klasky Csupo characters remain in the parking lot as of 2026.

=== Other productions ===
The feature-length film Demon Slayer was produced by the school in 2003 and was financed by Roger Corman. The cast and crew for the film, including director James Cotton, was composed of students and alumni of The Los Angeles Film School. The film was produced through the school's 1st Chance Films program, which partners well-known producers with its students to make films using the facilities at the school.

The school's Military Services Department produced the 2011 documentary The Yellow Ribbon Experience, which chronicles the reintegration of soldiers from the 63rd Regional Support Command into civilian life.

== Academics ==
The school is accredited by the Accrediting Commission of Career Schools and Colleges (ACCSC) and approved by the California Bureau for Private Postsecondary Education (BPPE) to offer associate and bachelor's degrees.

The Los Angeles Film School offers over 27 degree programs (associate, bachelor's, and online) related to the entertainment and gaming industries. Programs include a film program that includes digital filmmaking, film production, directing, cinematography, as well as those focused on writing for film and television, and the entertainment business.

Programs related to the video game industry and design include degrees in gaming design, environment design, computer and character animation and visual effects.

== Awards and recognition ==
Since 2017, Billboard has included the school in their Top 25 Music Business Schools list. In 2026 it honored the online music business program, which they describer as "built to accommodate flexible schedules". They also mentioned "Alumnus Anthony Vilchis, a Grammy-nominated mixing and mastering engineer with more than 600 major-label credits including Sabrina Carpenter’s Billboard 200 No. 1 Short n’ Sweet"

Variety has repeatedly included The Los Angeles Film School in their annual "Education Impact Report" highlighting established schools in the entertainment, film, and music sectors. In 2019, Variety included The Los Angeles Film School Students in their "Education Impact Report: 110 Students to Watch" special.

In 2026, TheWrap named the film school in its annual "Top 50 Film Schools" for the fifth year in a row.

== Industry events ==
Since its opening, The Los Angeles Film School has hosted intimate conversations with Award-winning filmmakers and screenwriters such as Spike Lee (Crooklyn, Malcolm X), Jordan Peele (Get Out), Barry Jenkins (Moonlight), John Ridley (12 Years a Slave), and Greta Gerwig (Little Women).

The Guild of Music Supervisors has held its annual "State of the Music in Media" conference at The Los Angeles Film School. In 2023, the Guild celebrated the 50th Anniversary of Hip-hop with guests Public Enemy co-founder Chuck D, sharing a preview of his PBS docuseries Fight the Power: How Hip-Hop Changed the World and led a panel of the same name, Salt-N-Pepa's Cheryl James (Salt), who spoke about the origins of hip-hop.

In 2020, The Los Angeles Film School hosted Academy Award-nominated songwriters — Cynthia Erivo, Bernie Taupin, Diane Warren, Kristen Anderson-Lopez and Robert Lopez — in a panel discussion for students hosted by songwriter and American Society of Composers, Authors and Publishers (ASCAP) chairman/president Paul Williams. Beginning in 2007, the school held an annual panel discussion that featured writers of Oscar-nominated films. Past guest speakers included Academy Award Winners Straight Outta Compton co-writer Jonathan Herman and The Big Short co-writer Charles Randolph, as well as Oscar-nominated Inside Out co-writer Josh Cooley and Carol screenwriter Phyllis Nagy.

In 2010, the Grammy Lifetime Achievement Award for Bob Marley was presented to the artist's family at the school.

From 2012 through 2013, filmmaker Kevin Smith included The Los Angeles Film School students in his "Film School Fridays" podcast.

DJ Paul Oakenfold held his DJ Camps at The Los Angeles Film School's Los Angeles Recording School facility.

The school also hosted the BAFTA Student Film Awards in 2011.

== Staff and faculty ==
Notable instructors have included:

- Danford B. Greene, editor
- J. Todd Harris, film and Broadway producer
- Douglas Knapp, cinematagrapher
- Jeff Kushner, film sound editor
- Hal Lieberman, Universal Studios executive and film producer

== Notable alumni ==
Notable alumni include:

- Chaz Echols, director
- R.D. Alba, director
- Kameron Alexander, music producer and singer/songwriter
- Phillip Bladh, sound engineer
- Carlton Bost, musician
- Hannah Lux Davis, music video director
- Jaycen Joshua, audio engineer
- Kyle Newacheck, actor and director
- Martin Pensa, editor
- Adrian Picardi, film and television director
- Jake Pitts, musician and music producer
- Sy'Rai Smith, singer/songwriter
- Brandon Trost, cinematographer
- Diego Vicentini, filmmaker
- Matt Villines, comedian and director
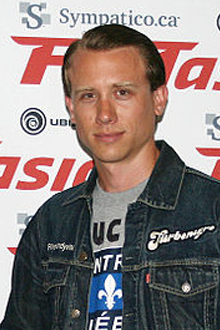
Cinematographer and Director Brandon Trost (Film, 2000)

Music Video Director Hannah "Lux" Davis (Film, 2006)

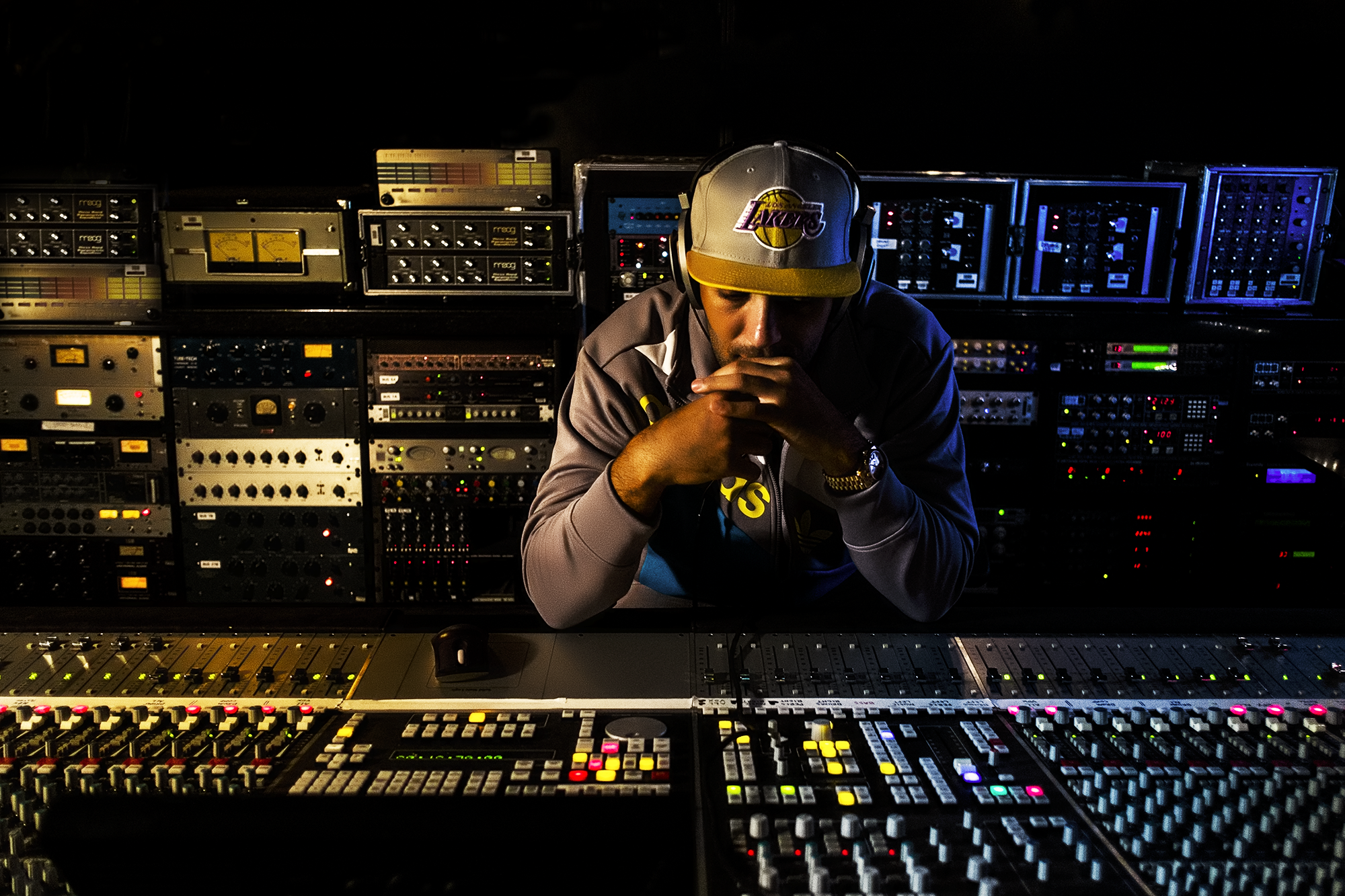
Audio Engineer and Producer Jaycen Joshua (Recording Arts 2003)

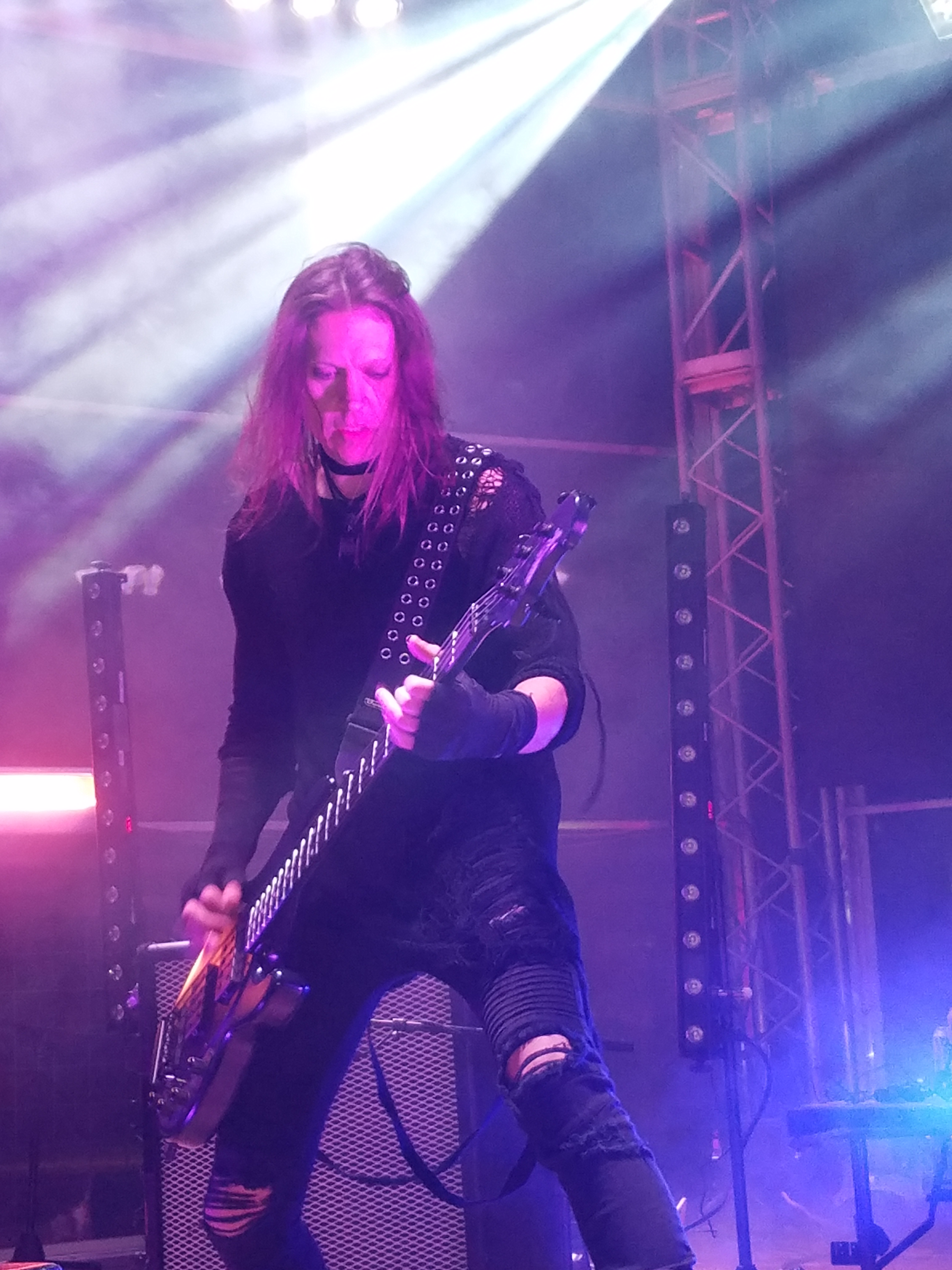
Guitarist and Musician Carlton Bost (Orgy, Deadsy, Berlin, Stabbing Westward)

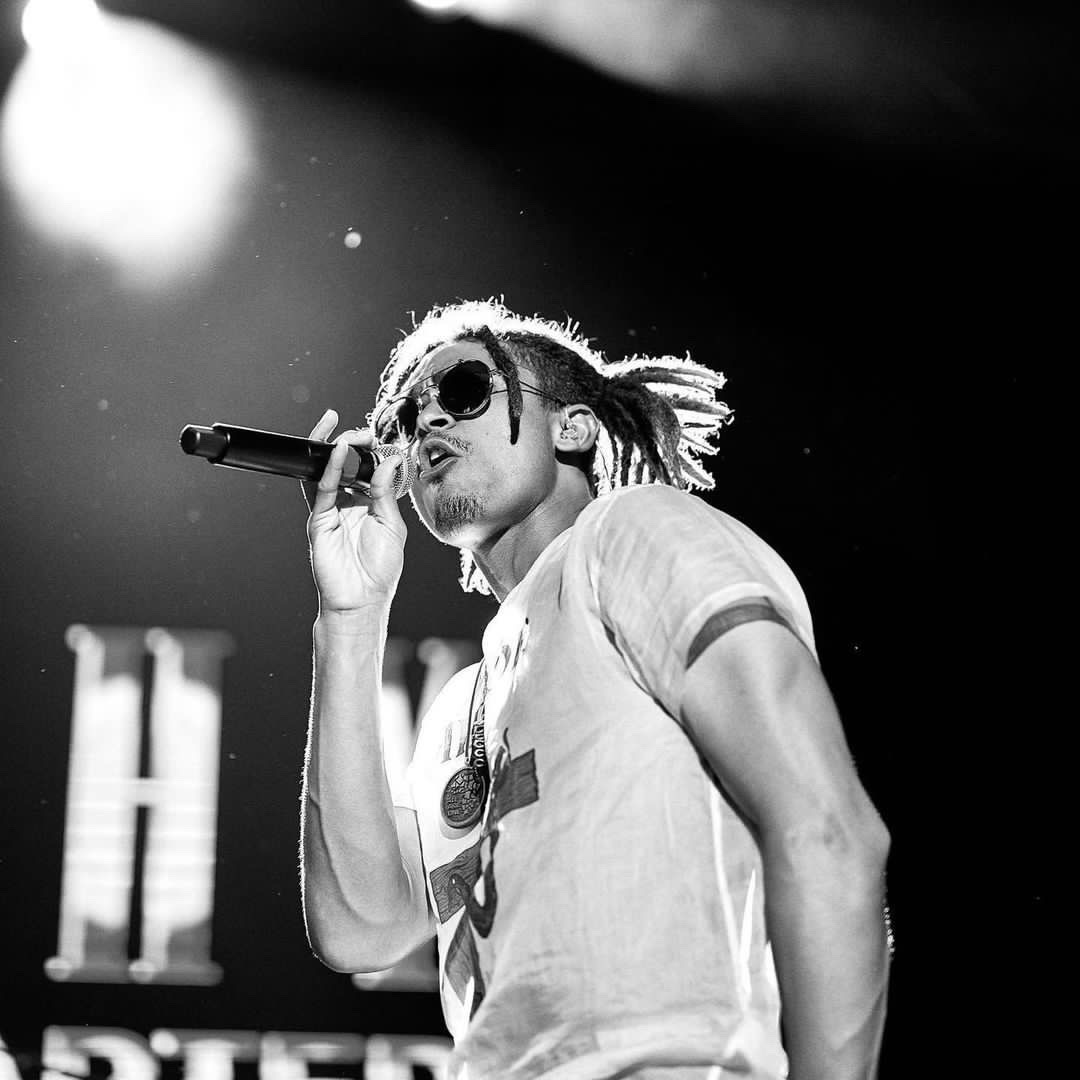
Producer Kameron Alexander

Guitarist Jake Pitts (Black Veil Brides)

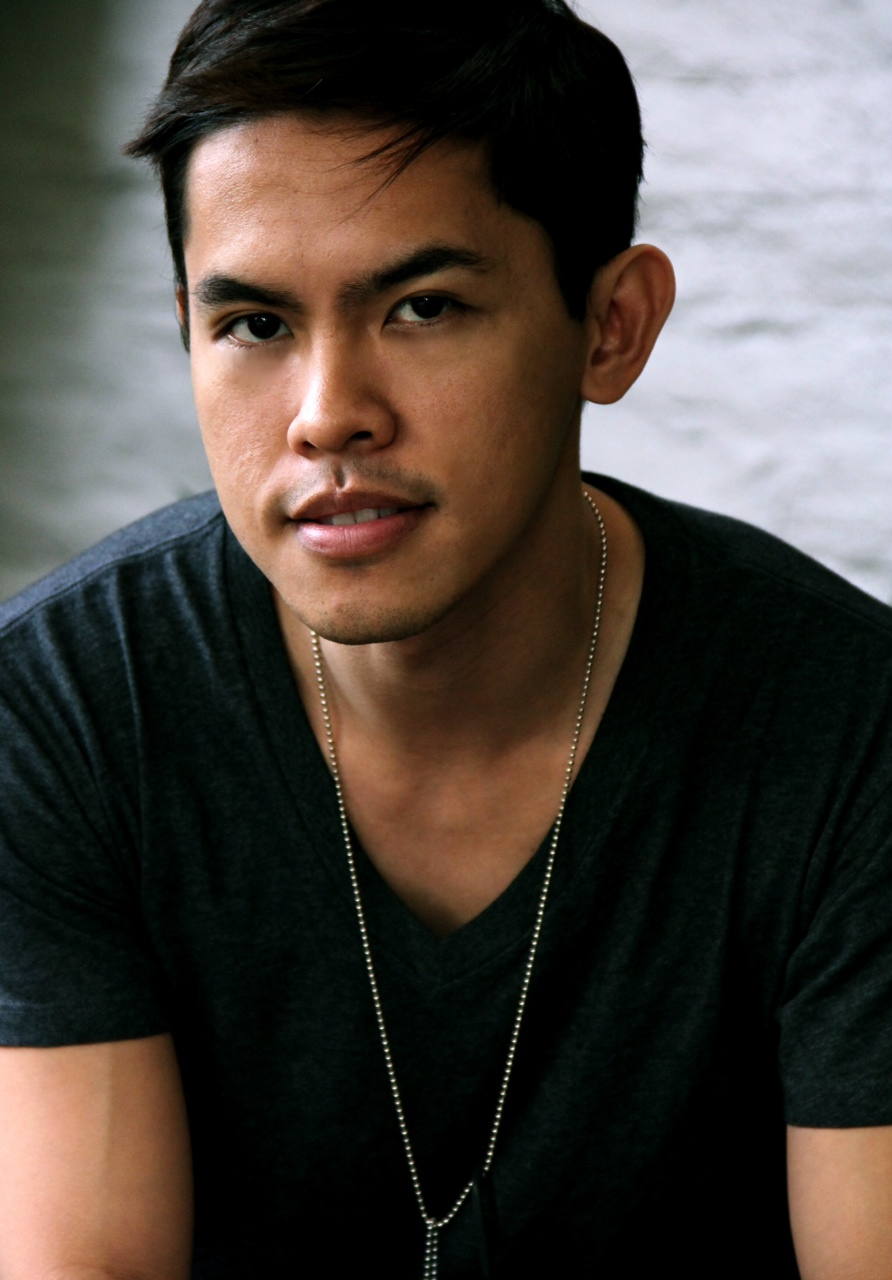
Film & TV Director R.D. Alba (Film, 2000)
