= Jeffrey Schwarz =

American filmmaker

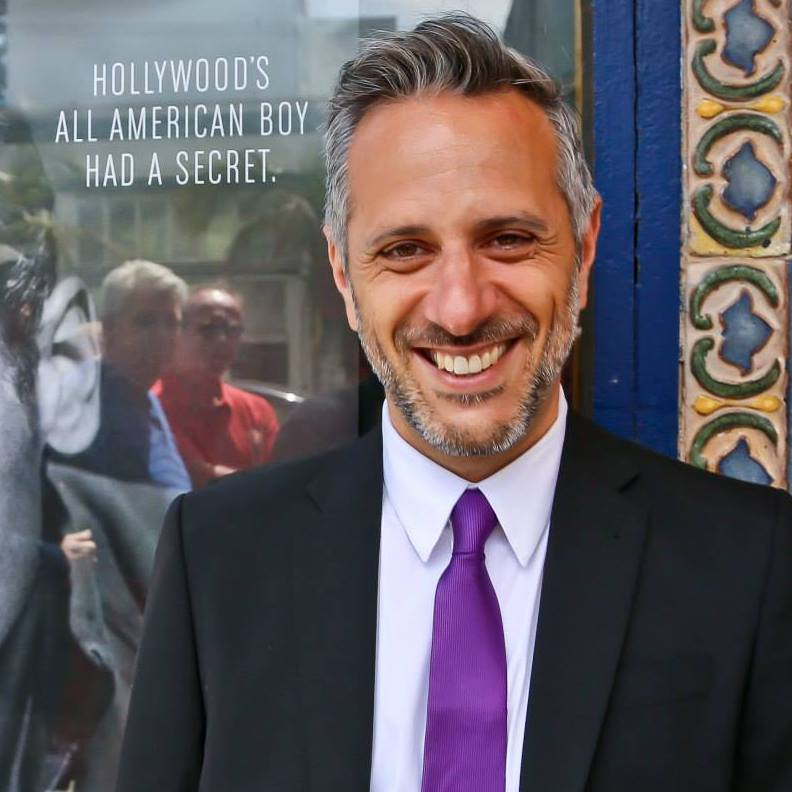
- Born: September 15, 1969 (age 57); New York City, U.S.
- Occupations: Producer; director; editor
- Years active: 1993–present

Jeffrey Schwarz (born September 15, 1969) is an American Emmy Award-winning film producer, director, and editor. He is known for an extensive body of documentary work including Commitment to Life, Boulevard! A Hollywood Story, The Fabulous Allan Carr, Tab Hunter Confidential, I Am Divine, Vito, Wrangler: Anatomy of an Icon, Spine Tingler! The William Castle Story, and Mineshaft: The Cruising Murders.

== Early life ==
Schwarz was born in New York City and is a graduate of SUNY Purchase Film Department. His senior thesis documentary was Al Lewis in the Flesh, a short film profiling actor Al Lewis, famous for playing Grampa on the television series The Munsters. The film observes Lewis as he interacts with the public at his Bleecker Street restaurant, Grampa's Bella Gente.

Schwarz' first job in the film industry was as an apprentice editor on The Celluloid Closet, Rob Epstein and Jeffrey Friedman's film adaptation of Vito Russo's seminal book. Schwarz's work on this project would later bridge into the development of his own documentary about Russo, titled simply Vito.

== Career ==
Schwarz spent the late 1990s working in the low budget feature world, editing movies and trailers for directors such as Gary Graver, Fred Olen Ray and David DeCoteau. In 1998, Schwarz was hired to edit a documentary about the making of Gus Van Sant's controversial remake of Alfred Hitchcock's Psycho. Psycho Path was included on the Universal Pictures Home Entertainment DVD release of Psycho, and was Schwarz's first foray into the burgeoning world of DVD bonus features, also known as value added material (VAM).

As the DVD-Video format was introduced to the public, all the major studios began offering making-of featurettes and audio commentaries on their discs as an incentive to consumers to replace movies they already owned on VHS or laserdisc. Schwarz capitalized on this moment to segue into producing original bonus content, and soon became one of the leading producers in this field.

In 2000, Schwarz founded the Los Angeles-based production house, Automat Pictures. Schwarz and a team of skilled producers created content for over 100 major DVD and Blu-ray studio releases, and soon expanded into the production of EPKs (electronic press kits) and original television programming.

In 2007, Schwarz began to segue into producing independent documentary features, the first being Spine Tingler! The William Castle Story about legendary Hollywood showman William Castle, who specialized in producing low-budget shockers. It featured interviews with Castle's daughter Terry, along with John Waters, Joe Dante, John Landis, Leonard Maltin, Roger Corman, John Badham, Diane Baker, Marcel Marceau, among others. The film premiered at the 2007 American Film Institute's AFI Fest and was awarded the Audience Award for Best Documentary.

In 2008, Schwarz directed the feature documentary Wrangler: Anatomy of an Icon, which focused on the life and career of porn star Jack Wrangler, who became a superstar in both the gay and straight markets before marrying singer Margaret Whiting and retiring from the porn industry. The film features Wrangler as well as a host of notable golden age porn figures such as Samantha Fox, Gloria Leonard, Jamie Gillis, Al Goldstein, Joe Gage, Sharon Mitchell and Candida Royalle. The film won a GayVN Awards in 2009 for Best Alternative Release by TLA Releasing. Wrangler died soon after its launch on the festival circuit in 2009.

His next feature, Vito, focused on the life of Vito Russo, gay activist, film scholar, author and major figure in the fight against AIDS. The film, executive produced by Bryan Singer and produced for HBO Documentary Films, premiered at the 2011 New York Film Festival and made its television debut on HBO in July 2012. It received an Emmy Award for Outstanding Research at the 2013 News and Documentary Emmy Awards, as well as a GLAAD Media Award nomination for Outstanding Documentary.

In 2013, Schwarz documented Baltimore drag performer Divine with the celebratory feature, I Am Divine. It featured extensive interviews with contemporaries and admirers including Divine's mother Frances Milstead, John Waters, Mink Stole, Tab Hunter, Bruce Vilanch, Susan Lowe, Peaches Christ, Ricki Lake, and others. The film had its World Premiere at the 2013 South by Southwest Film Festival, and garnered much critical praise and audience good will.

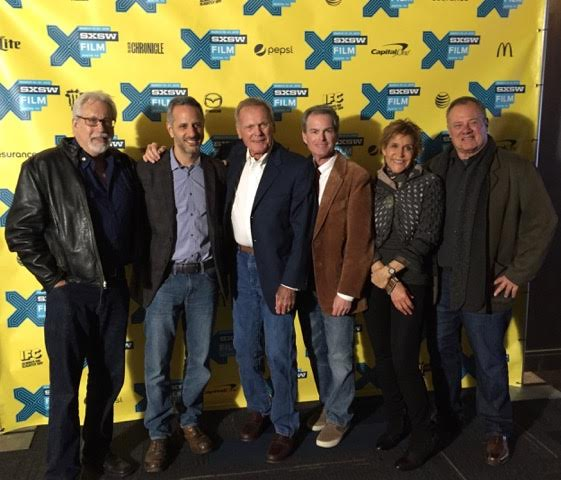
Schwarz (2nd from the left) at the Tab Hunter Confidential's premiere at 2015 SXSW

Following Hunter's participation in I Am Divine, Schwarz was approached by Hunter's partner, Allan Glaser, about adapting Hunter's best-selling autobiography, Tab Hunter Confidential: The Making of a Movie Star (2005, co-written with Eddie Muller), into a documentary feature of same name. The film features extensive interviews with Hunter, as well as friends and associates such as John Waters, Debbie Reynolds, Clint Eastwood, and George Takei. It had its World Premiere at the 2015 South by Southwest Film Festival, and went on to screen at festivals around the world to great acclaim. The film was nominated for "Outstanding Documentary" at the 27th GLAAD Media Awards.

Schwarz' 2017 The Fabulous Allan Carr, is a documentary about flamboyant Hollywood producer Allan Carr, famous for producing Grease, Can't Stop the Music, La Cage aux Folles, and the notorious 1989 Academy Awards broadcast. The film made its debut at the 2017 Seattle International Film Festival (SIFF). It features interviews with Patricia Birch, Maxwell Caulfield, Steve Guttenberg, Randy Jones, Randal Kleiser, Sherry Lansing, Lorna Luft, Michael Musto, Robert Osborne, Brett Ratner, Connie Stevens, Alana Stewart, Marlo Thomas, Bruce Vilanch and more.

In 2021, Boulevard! A Hollywood Story premiered at Outfest Los Angeles. Schwarz produced and directed along with John Boccardo. The film is about Dickson Hughes and Richard Stapley, two young composers who are hired by movie star Gloria Swanson to adapt a musical version of Billy Wilder's 1950 film Sunset Boulevard. The documentary also follows director Jeffrey Schwarz as he uncovers the story and discovers what happened to the two men later in their lives. The film features TCM's Robert Osborne in one of his final film appearances.

In February, 2023, Commitment to Life premiered at the Santa Barbara International Film Festival. It was acquired by NBC Universal's Peacock and made its debut on World AIDS Day December 1, 2023. The film tells the story of the fight against AIDS in Los Angeles, with an emphasis on the work of APLA Health, formerly known as AIDS Project Los Angeles. The film features interviews with Jewel Thais-Williams, Phill Wilson, Michael S. Gottlieb, Rev. Steve Pieters, Karamo Brown, Bruce Vilanch, Jeffrey Katzenberg, Torie Osborn, and Bamby Salcedo.

Schwarz has served as producer, co-producer, and executive producer on Ron Nyswaner's She's the Best Thing In It, Michael Stabile's Seed Money: The Chuck Holmes Story, Elijah Drenner's That Guy Dick Miller, and Rob Epstein and Jeffrey Friedman's And the Oscar Goes To. He was also consulting producer on Lisa Dapolito and CNN Films' Love, Gilda, which premiered at the 2018 Tribeca Film Festival, as well as Jennifer Kroot's The Untold Tales of Armistead Maupin.

== Upcoming projects ==
Currently in development is a feature documentary film Goddess: The Fall and Rise of Showgirls about the making of Paul Verhoeven's "misunderstood masterpiece" Showgirls.

== Personal life ==
Schwarz is gay. In June 2015 San Francisco's Frameline Film Festival presented Jeffrey with The Frameline Award which is designed to honor those who have made a major contribution to LGBT representation in film, television, or the media arts.
