= Allan Carr =

American producer (1937–1999)

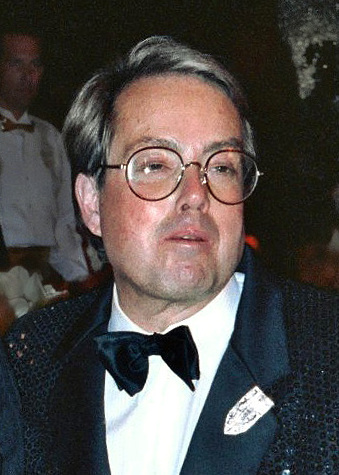
- Carr in 1989
- Born: Allan Solomon; May 27, 1937; Chicago, Illinois, U.S.
- Died: June 29, 1999 (aged 62); Beverly Hills, California, U.S.
- Education: Northwestern University
- Occupations: Producer; manager; screenwriter
- Years active: 1966–1999

Allan Carr (né Solomon; May 27, 1937 – June 29, 1999) was an American producer and manager of stage and screen. He was nominated for numerous awards, winning a Tony Award and two People's Choice Awards, and was named Producer of the Year by the National Association of Theatre Owners.

== Early career ==
Carr was born Allan Solomon to an American Jewish family in Chicago, Illinois. He attended Lake Forest College and Northwestern University, but his interest was always in show business. While at Northwestern, he invested $750 in the Broadway musical Ziegfeld Follies starring Tallulah Bankhead. Though the show was not a hit, he had also invested $1,250 in the 1967 film The Happiest Millionaire, which gave him the success he needed to leave school and embark on a career in entertainment.

In Chicago in the 1960s, he opened the Civic Theater and financed The World of Carl Sandburg starring Bette Davis and Gary Merrill, as well as Eva Le Gallienne in Mary Stuart, directed by Tyrone Guthrie, and Tennessee Williams's Garden District, featuring Cathleen Nesbitt and Diana Barrymore. Carr worked behind the scenes at Playboy with Hugh Hefner and was a co-creator of the Playboy Penthouse television series, which in turn launched the Playboy Club.

Through the years, he became known as a great planner of promotional events and parties. One such event, a black-tie affair for Truman Capote, took place in an abandoned Los Angeles jail.

== Management career ==
In 1966, Carr founded the talent agency Allan Carr Enterprises, managing the actors Tony Curtis, Peter Sellers, Rosalind Russell, Dyan Cannon, Melina Mercouri, and Marlo Thomas. Some of the other entertainment figures whose careers he managed were Ann-Margret, a string of whose television specials he also produced: Nancy Walker, Marvin Hamlisch, Joan Rivers, Peggy Lee, Cass Elliot, Paul Anka, Petula Clark, Frankie Valli and the Four Seasons, George Maharis and Herb Alpert and the Tijuana Brass.

Carr was responsible for the invention of the false and much-derided story that Cass Elliot died by choking on a ham sandwich. In 2020, journalist Sue Cameron admitted that she promulgated the story at Carr's request by writing it into Elliot's obituary for The Hollywood Reporter; Carr decided that the humiliating falsehood was preferable to the implication that Elliot's heart attack was associated with substance abuse.

Carr is also credited for having discovered numerous celebrities, including some who also became his clients, such as Mark Hamill, Michelle Pfeiffer, Steve Guttenberg and Lisa Hartman.

== Grease and Broadway success ==
Producer Robert Stigwood hired him in 1975 as marketing and promotion consultant, with his first project being for the film version of the rock opera Tommy. The film was a hit and he expanded his involvement for his next film, re-editing and overdubbing a low-budget foreign film about a real-life disaster. The result was Survive! (The disaster in question was also described in Piers Paul Read's book Alive.) The surprise box office success of Survive! in 1976 made Carr a wealthy man and gave him clout at Paramount Pictures.

In 1977, Stigwood asked him to produce the ad campaign for Saturday Night Fever, and he turned the film's premiere into a star-studded television special. It worked so well that Stigwood gave him Grease (1978). Carr not only helmed the ad campaign and produced the premiere party and television special for Grease, but also co-produced the film for six million dollars, casting his then client Olivia Newton-John. It became the highest-grossing film of the year, and one of the highest-grossing films up until that time, at just under $100 million. The film was nominated for five Golden Globe Awards and won two People's Choice Awards, for Best Picture and Best Musical Picture. That year he even appeared in a role on the final season of the Angie Dickinson television series Police Woman. Stigwood and Carr would work on several other films, including 1978 Oscar-winning The Deer Hunter.

The following year, 1979, he produced the Village People film musical Can't Stop The Music, a production which, while campy, steered clear of addressing the band members' presumed homosexuality in the script. Again he orchestrated a lavish series of premieres and a television special that co-starred his friends Hefner and Cher. But the film was released in 1980, after the crash of the disco craze, and as a result, it was a major flop. Because of this, Carr "won" the first annual Golden Raspberry Award for Worst Picture in 1981. Undaunted, he went on to produce Grease 2 (1982) which, while nowhere near the hit of its predecessor, was not the financial loss that Can't Stop The Music had been.

When Carr was in Paris for the premiere of Grease, a friend took him to see a play about a gay couple, La Cage aux Folles. By this time in his career, Carr was ready to face the gay theme head on. Returning to Broadway he produced a musical version of the 1973 play, which had since been made into a French film, and would later be remade as an American film called The Birdcage. With a book by Harvey Fierstein and music and lyrics by Jerry Herman, the show opened in 1983 and was a huge success, running for five years and 1,761 performances. Nominated in 1984 for eight Drama Desk Awards and eight Tony Awards, the show won three Drama Desks and an impressive six Tonys, including a "Best Musical" win for Carr.

== Snow White and the Academy Awards ==
Carr's reputation for hosting expensive and lavish parties and creating spectacular production numbers led AMPAS to hire him to produce the 61st Academy Awards on March 29, 1989. Carr made a promise to shift the show from its perceived dry and dull stature to something different, one that would be inspired by Beach Blanket Babylon (created by Steve Silver), the musical revue show featuring Snow White during the Golden Age of Hollywood. Three time Academy Award winner Marvin Hamlisch was brought in as conductor. With the promise of being "the antithesis of tacky," for which the ceremony would have no host, as it would rotate actors and actresses instead generally put in pairs as part of Carr's theme of "couples, companions, costars, and compadres", with the most notable pair being Bob Hope and Lucille Ball (in her final public appearance before her death just a few weeks later). The criticism for the ceremony stemmed mostly from the musical numbers that attempted to cross both Old and New Hollywood together. It began with a booming voice stating that the "star of all time" would arrive soon, which came in the form of Snow White, played by Eileen Bowman (Lorna Luft declined, much to her subsequent relief), who proceeded to try and shake the hands of stars in the audience in the theater (much to the embarrassment of nominated actress Michelle Pfeiffer). Merv Griffin started the show with his 1950 hit “I’ve Got a Lovely Bunch of Coconuts!”, complete with a re-creation of the Cocoanut Grove nightclub that featured a collection of established stars such as Vincent Price, Alice Faye, and Roy Rogers. Bowman returned to the stage afterwards to sing a duet of "Proud Mary" with Rob Lowe, which lasted twelve minutes. A second production number was done later with "The Stars of Tomorrow" doing a number called "I Wanna Be An Oscar Winner" that featured actors in their teens/mid-20s such as Christian Slater (sword fighting Tyrone Power Jr.), Chad Lowe (shouting "I am a Thespian"), and Patrick Dempsey (tap dancing along the stairwell).

Steve Silver, asked about the opening number while looking at the reviews, stated, "Janet Maslin says it is the worst production number in the history of the Oscars. I guess you can't top that. The publicity for Beach Blanket Babylon ought to be wonderful.” An open letter was released on April 7, featuring 17 figures of Hollywood (such as former Academy president Gregory Peck) that called the ceremony an embarrassment to the academy and the industry. Two days later, the Los Angeles Times dedicated its entire letter section (ten in total) to hate mail about the ceremony, titling it “For Some, the Oscar Show Was One Big Carr Crash." The Walt Disney Company sued the academy shortly after the ceremony for copyright infringement (no one at the academy had asked for permission from Disney regarding Snow White), which forced the academy to make a formal apology. Lowe defended his appearance by describing himself as a "good soldier" doing it for the academy, while Bowman would state later that the show looked like a "gay bar mitzvah", doing so years after the fact after having signed a gag order that had her not talk about the show for thirteen years. Carr's reputation in Hollywood did not fully recover from the blowback the ceremony received, although there were some retaining benefits. The ratings for the show were marginally better than the previous ceremony, as over 42 million viewers in 26 million homes saw the ceremony in the United States. The choice of no host for the ceremony would be replicated for the 2019 ceremony. Carr's decision to change the announcement from "And the winner is..." to "And the Oscar goes to.." has been used for each Academy ceremony since. Carr elected to have retailer Fred Hayman get designers to dress the stars for arrival on the red carpet, which became its own segment of focus in later years. Comedian Bruce Vilanch, hired as a writer for the show, would work on the show for the next two decades, which included a promotion to head writer. Carr did not produce another film or television show again.

== Later work ==
That same year Carr helmed the project Goya: A Life in Song with Freddie Gershon and CBS Records, a concept album and, later, an off-Broadway musical theater production written by Maury Yeston (Nine) and featuring Plácido Domingo as artist Francisco Goya. Still in development for a full Broadway production, the music has been recorded by Domingo with Dionne Warwick in English and Gloria Estefan in Spanish, and a version of the duet "Till I Loved You" was a top-40 single for Barbra Streisand and Don Johnson.

Carr continued his work in theater, sponsoring the 1984-85 Royal Shakespeare Company productions of Cyrano de Bergerac and Much Ado About Nothing at Washington's Kennedy Center and Broadway's Gershwin Theatre, earning 10 Tony nominations between them including one more for Carr. Carr had returned to Paramount Pictures to handle the re-release of Grease in 1998, which included producing a VH1 television special of the twentieth anniversary Hollywood "premiere" screening and party, and special edition re-releases of the video, DVD, and soundtrack album.

== Production filmography ==
Carr was a producer of numerous movies, including:

- The First Time (1969)
- C.C. and Company (1970)
- Grease (1978)
- Can't Stop the Music (1980)
- Grease 2 (1982)
- Where the Boys Are '84 (1984)
- Cloak & Dagger (1984)

== Personal life and death ==
Carr died from liver cancer on June 29, 1999, in Beverly Hills, California. His ashes were scattered in front of his former Diamond Head house on Oahu by Ann-Margret, her husband Roger Smith, and Martin Menard. At the time of his death, he split his time between his homes in Beverly Hills and Palm Springs, and was working on bringing Ken Ludwig's Tony-winning comedy Lend Me a Tenor to Australia and the UK, and was preparing a new Broadway show, The New Musical Adventures of Tom Sawyer.

Director Roman Polanski, who had recently been arrested in a statutory rape case, received a standing ovation at Carr's "Rolodex" party.

In 2017, a documentary about Carr's life was released entitled The Fabulous Allan Carr. The film's director, Jeffrey Schwarz, said, "Although it was no secret that Allan Carr was gay, he never formally acknowledged it publicly. The word 'flamboyant' was used to describe him, a code word."
