= Los Angeles Recording School =

American private, for-profit college in California

Coordinates: 34.097681°N 118.336318°W

- Type: Private college, for-profit
- Established: 1985
- President: Diana Derycz-Kessler
- Administrative staff: 350
- Students: 1,500
- Location: Los Angeles, California, USA
- Campus: Urban
- Website: www.larecordingschool.com

The Los Angeles Recording School is a private, for-profit college and is a division of the larger Los Angeles Film School. It is located in Hollywood, California. The school offers Associate of Science degree programs in Recording Arts and Music Production. It was founded in 1985 as the Los Angeles Recording Workshop.

== Facilities ==
The Los Angeles Recording School (LARS) has over 33,000 square feet (3,100 m^{2}) of facilities and classrooms, including over 20 Recording Labs and Studios. The Los Angeles Recording School is located in Hollywood on Sunset Boulevard and is a division of the Los Angeles Film School.

== Costs ==
Tuition costs range from $33,000 - $36,000 for an individual associate degree.

== Accreditation ==
The Los Angeles Recording School is a division of The Los Angeles Film School which is accredited by ACCSC, the Accrediting Commission of Career Schools and Colleges.

== Student life ==
The Los Angeles Recording School's campus is an urban one and does not have residential facilities. Instead, students either commute or rent nearby apartments.
