= Boulevard! A Hollywood Story =

- Directed by: Jeffrey Schwarz
- Produced by: John Boccardo; Jeffrey Schwarz
- Music by: Miriam Cutler
- Production companies: Automat Pictures; Lottie & Lorraine Pictures
- Release date: 2021
- Running time: 85 minutes
- Country: United States
- Language: English

Boulevard! A Hollywood Story is a 2021 American documentary film by Jeffrey Schwarz. It is the story of Gloria Swanson's attempt to adapt a musical version of Billy Wilder's 1950 film Sunset Boulevard with composers Dickson Hughes and Richard Stapley.

== Awards and nominations ==
Group	Year	Category	Recipient	Result	Ref
FilmOut San Diego	2021	FilmOut Festival Award - Best Documentary	Jeffrey Schwarz	Won	
