= Frogs for Snakes =

- Theatrical release poster
- Directed by: Amos Poe
- Screenplay by: Amos Poe
- Produced by: Phyllis Freed Kaufman; Larry Meistrich; Daniel J. Victor
- Starring: Barbara Hershey; Robbie Coltrane; Harry Hamlin; Ian Hart; John Leguizamo; Lisa Marie; Debi Mazar; Ron Perlman; Clarence Williams III
- Cinematography: Enrique Chediak
- Edited by: Jeff Kushner
- Music by: Lazy Boy
- Production companies: Shooting Gallery; Rain Film
- Distributed by: Artisan Entertainment
- Release dates: February 20, 1998 (B.I.F.F.); August 14, 1998 (U.S.)
- Running time: 108 minutes
- Country: United States
- Language: English
- Box office: $20,693 (USA)

Frogs for Snakes is a 1998 film written and directed by Amos Poe.

== Plot ==
Out of work actress Eva (Hershey), pays her way by working as a waitress at a diner in Manhattan's Lower East Side owned by Quint (Hart). She makes extra cash by making collections for her ex-husband, loan shark Al (Coltrane). The film also involves Eva's new boyfriend Zip (Leguizamo), wanna-be actress Myrna (Marie), Al's girlfriend Simone (Mazar), gangster Gascone (Perlman), and Al's driver UB (Deblinger).

Eva is ready to give up both the loan collecting and acting, dreaming of a suburban house with a picket-fence lifestyle with her son Augie (Kerkoulas). Al agrees to let her go, but needs her for just one more job, locating the missing $600,000 stolen from him by Flav (Theroux). Al also plans to produce a stage production of David Mamet's American Buffalo, and he offers a role to UB if he will murder Zip.

== Principal cast ==
- Barbara Hershey as Eva Santana
- Robbie Coltrane as Al Santana
- Ian Hart as Quint
- John Leguizamo as "Zip"
- Debi Mazar as Simone
- Ron Perlman as Gascone
- Justin Theroux as "Flav" Santana
- Clarence Williams III as Huck Hanley
- Mike Starr as Crunch Gwiazda
- Harry Hamlin as Klench
- Lisa Marie as Myrna L'Hatsky
- Nick Chinlund as Iggy Schmurtz
- David Deblinger as U.B.
- Zak Kerkoulas as Augie
- Nicole Arlyn as Flo

== Critical reception ==
The film received mostly negative reviews.

Roger Ebert of The Chicago Sun-Times gave the film zero stars:

Amos Poe's Frogs for Snakes is not a film so much as a filmed idea. That could be interesting, but alas it is a very bad idea... I was reminded of Mad Dog Time (1996), another movie in which well-known actors engaged in laughable dialogue while shooting one another. Of that one, I wrote: "'Mad Dog Time' is the first movie I have seen that does not improve on the sight of a blank screen viewed for the same length of time." Now comes Frogs for Snakes, the first movie I have seen that does not improve on the sight of Mad Dog Time.

Mark Savlov of The Austin Chronicle:

With an all-star cast like this, you'd think Poe's film would be a knockout indie smash, a character-driven acting spree or maybe a quiet reflection on the fine art of the smirk. You'd be wrong, of course, but no one could fault you for hoping. On paper, Poe's humorous take on actors and gangsters and the merging of the two (he also penned the script) must have read like comic gangbusters, but the finished product is more histrionics than hysterical... Occasionally, Poe will gussy up the non-action by freezing the tail ends of scenes, but most of the proceedings drag on endlessly. It's an exercise in so what? filmmaking that has marked the restless, ambivalent edge of American indie filmmaking for some time (Tom DiCillo's meandering Box of Moonlight springs to mind as a good example of this). Actors may well salivate with giddy glee over this Lower East Side take on their art, but for the rest of us it's an exercise in ennui.

== Soundtrack listing ==
1. "Subterranean Homesick Blues" by Bob Dylan
2. "Uneasy Street" by Lazy Boy
3. "Sweet Thing" by The Gaturs
4. "Theme From Headtrader" by Lazy Boy
5. "Destination Moon" by Dinah Washington
6. "Delivery For Mr. Rilke" by Jeffrey Howard
7. "Downtown" by Toledo Diamond
8. "The Man with The Golden Arm" by Barry Adamson
9. "Blood on White Shoes" by Howard Shore
10. "Not a Waltz" by Wolly
11. "Horns for Harry" by Jeffrey Howard
12. "Mr. Excitement" by Tipsy
13. "Fly Away" by Poe
14. "Si Mi Chiamo Mimi" from La bohème, with vocalist Luba Orgonášová and Czecho-Slovak Radio Symphony Orchestra
15. "Fattening Frogs for Snakes" by Patti Smith
