= Character actor =

Actor who predominantly plays distinctive or eccentric characters

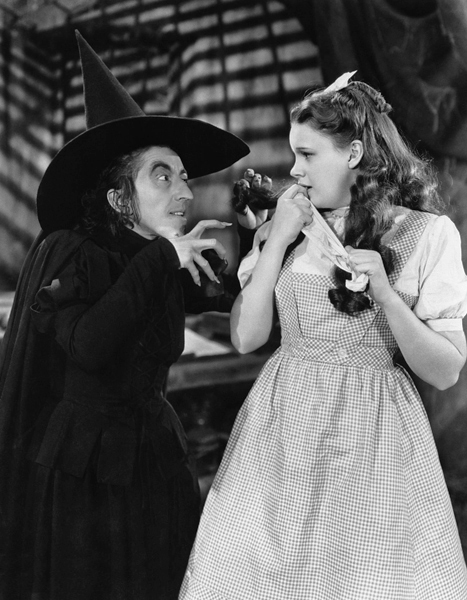
Character actress Margaret Hamilton (left) in real life was a "sweet, gentle woman" who taught kindergarten prior to working on Broadway and Hollywood, which was different from her on-screen persona of the Wicked Witch in the 1939 film The Wizard of Oz.

A character actor is an actor known for playing unusual, eccentric, or interesting characters in supporting roles rather than leading ones. (Note: However, Sir David Suchet, who played the eponymous leading role in Agatha Christie's Poirot (1989–2013), describes himself as a character actor.) The term is somewhat abstract and open to interpretation. While all actors play "characters", the term character actor is often applied to an actor who frequently plays a distinctive and important supporting role.

A character actor may play a variety of characters in their career, often referred to as a "chameleon", or may be known for playing the same type of roles. Character actor roles are more substantial than bit parts or non-speaking extras. The term is used primarily to describe television and film actors, as opposed to theater actors. An early use of the term was in the 1883 edition of The Stage, which defined a character actor as "one who portrays individualities and eccentricities". Actors with a long career history of playing character roles may be difficult for audiences to recognize as being the same actor.

== Overview ==
In contrast to leading actors, they are generally seen as less glamorous. While a leading actor often has the conventional physical attractiveness considered necessary to play the love interest, a character actor typically does not. In fact, some character actors are known for their unusual looks. For example, Chicago character actor William Schutz's face was disfigured in a car accident when he was five years old, but his appearance after reconstructive surgery helped him to be distinctive to theater audiences. Generally, the names of character actors are not featured prominently in movie and television advertising on the marquee, since a character actor's name is not expected to attract film audiences. Some character actors have been described as instantly recognizable despite their names being little known. They are colloquially referred to as "that guy", or "that guy" actors, as in the 2014 documentary That Guy Dick Miller; a notable example of a "that guy" actor is John Carroll Lynch.

Over the course of an acting career, an actor can sometimes shift between leading roles and supporting roles. Some leading actors, as they get older, find that access to leading roles is limited by their age. Sometimes character actors have developed careers based on specific talents needed in genre films, such as dancing, horsemanship, acrobatics, swimming ability, or boxing. Many up-and-coming actors find themselves typecast in character roles due to an early success with a particular part or in a certain genre, such that the actor becomes so strongly identified with a particular type of role that casting directors and theatrical agents steer the actor to similar roles. Some character actors are known as "chameleons", able to play roles that vary wildly, such as Gary Oldman.

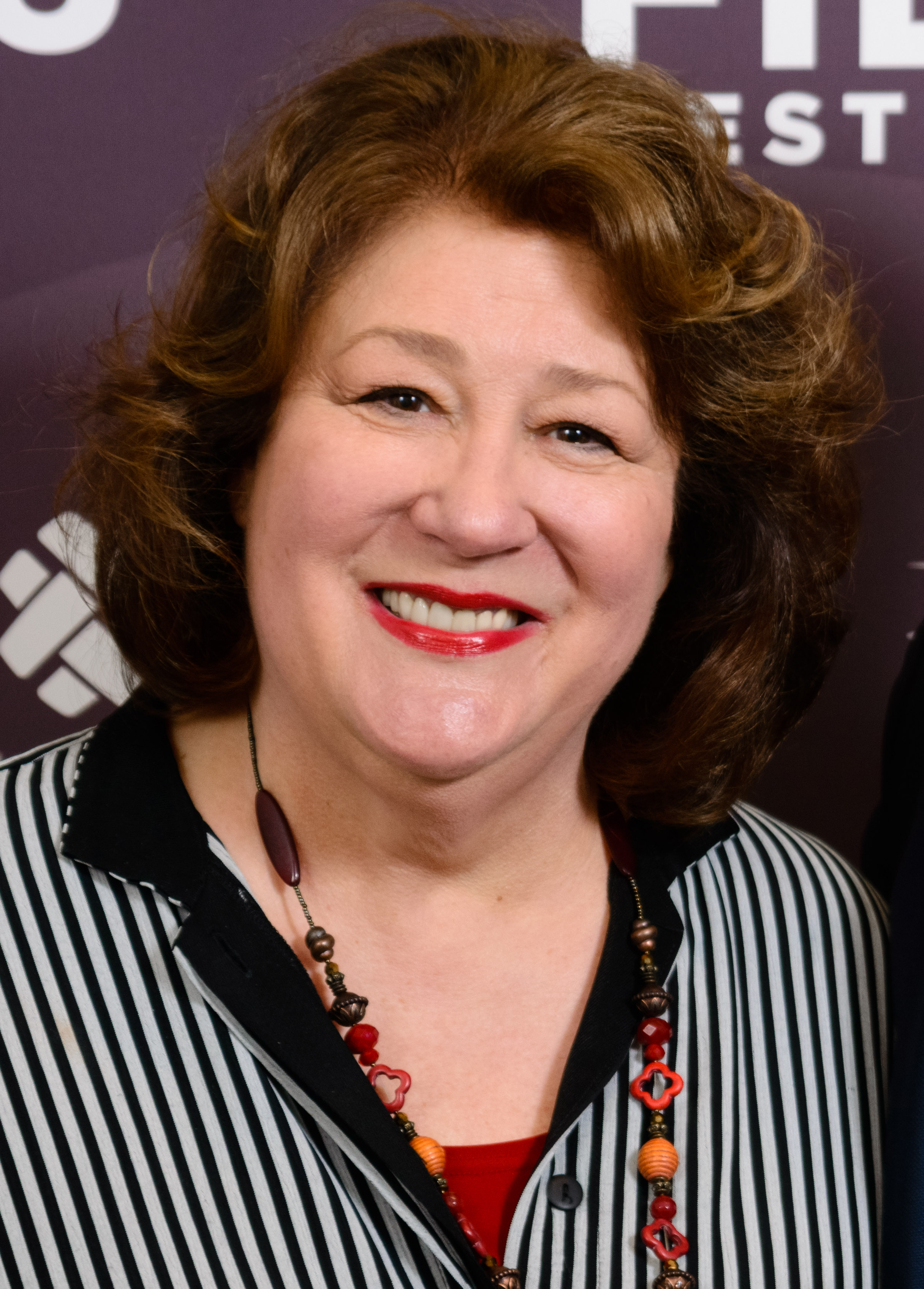
Actress Margo Martindale is an example of a character actress.

Many character actors tend to play the same type of role throughout their careers, like Harvey Keitel as tough, determined characters; Christopher Lloyd as eccentrics; Claude Rains as sophisticated, sometimes morally ambiguous men; Abe Vigoda as aging criminals; Fairuza Balk as moody goth girls; Doug Jones as non-human creatures; and Forest Whitaker as composed characters with underlying volatility. Ed Lauter usually portrayed a menacing figure because of his "long, angular face", which was easily recognized in public, although audiences rarely knew his name. Character actors can play a variety of types, such as the femme fatale, gunslinger, sidekick, town drunk, villain, hooker with a heart of gold, and many others. Prolific character actors, such as Margo Martindale, are rarely out of work, and they often have long careers that span decades. They are often highly esteemed by fellow actors.

== See also ==
- Commedia dell'arte
- Leading actor
- Stock character
- Typecasting
