= That Guy Dick Miller =

- Directed by: Elijah Drenner
- Starring: Dick Miller; Lainie Miller; Gilbert Adler
- Cinematography: Elle Schneider
- Edited by: Elijah Drenner
- Music by: Jason Brandt
- Production companies: Autumn Rose Productions, End Films
- Release date: March 7, 2014 (SXSW)
- Running time: 91 minutes
- Country: United States
- Language: English

That Guy Dick Miller is a 2014 documentary directed by Elijah Drenner. The film had its world premiere on March 7, 2014 at South by Southwest and looks into the life and career of character actor Dick Miller. Funding for the film was raised through a Kickstarter campaign.

== Synopsis ==
The documentary surveys the life and acting career of Dick Miller, who has performed in over 170 roles in various films and television shows as a character actor. It features several interviews, as well as footage from many of Miller's performances.

== Cast ==
Interviews include:

- Dick Miller
- Lainie Miller
- Gilbert Adler
- Allan Arkush
- Meiert Avis
- Belinda Balaski
- Ira Steven Behr
- Kent Beyda
- Steve Carver
- Julie Corman
- Roger Corman
- Joe Dante
- Jon Davison
- Fred Dekker
- David Del Valle
- Leonard Maltin
- Fred Olen Ray
- John Sayles
- Robert Forster
- Mary Woronov

== Reception ==
Critical reception for That Guy Dick Miller has been predominantly positive. Film Threat praised the documentary's use of interviews, as they noted that these would normally be ineffective "because they come off as little more than EPK-publicity materials designed to bow at the altar of an already-known icon" and felt that the interviews in the film came off as showing genuine admiration for Miller. Twitch Film and Ain't It Cool News also gave the film positive reviews, and Ain't it Cool News considered it to be "a warm, worthy tribute to a national treasure!" The Hollywood Reporter gave the film a B−, as they enjoyed the film overall but felt that it "too frequently loses focus".
