= 27th GLAAD Media Awards =

Annual US media awards ceremony

The 27th GLAAD Media Awards is the 2016 annual presentation of the GLAAD Media Awards, presented by GLAAD honoring the 2015 season. The awards honored films, television shows, musicians and works of journalism that fairly and accurately represent the LGBT community and issues relevant to the community. GLAAD announced 144 nominees in 31 English and Spanish language categories for the awards. The awards were presented at ceremonies in Los Angeles on April 2 and New York on May 14. The nominees were announced on January 27, 2016. American singer Demi Lovato, who was honored with the GLAAD Vanguard Award, performed "Stone Cold" at the Los Angeles ceremonies on April 2, 2016.

== Winners and nominees ==
Winners are presented in bold.

=== English-language categories ===
Award	Nominees
Outstanding Film - Wide Release	**Carol**; The Danish Girl; Dope; Freeheld; Grandma
Outstanding Film - Limited Release	**Tangerine**; 52 Tuesdays; Appropriate Behavior; Boy Meets Girl; Drunktown's Finest
Outstanding Drama Series	**Sense8**; Arrow; Black Sails; Empire; The Fosters; Grey's Anatomy; How to Get Away With Murder; Nashville; Orphan Black; Shameless
Outstanding Comedy Series	**Transparent**; Brooklyn Nine-Nine; Faking It; Grace and Frankie; Looking; Master of None; Modern Family; Orange Is The New Black; Please Like Me; Vicious
Outstanding Individual Episode (in a series without a regular LGBT character)	**"The Prince of Nucleotides" of Royal Pains**; "Gender" of The Carmichael Show; "Please Don't Ask, Please Don't Tell" of Black-ish; "Rock-a-Bye-Baby" of NCIS: New Orleans; "We Build, We Fight" of NCIS
Outstanding TV Movie or Mini-Series	**Bessie**; Banana; Cucumber
Outstanding Documentary	**Kumu Hina**; Limited Partnership; Mala Mala; Tab Hunter Confidential; Tig
Outstanding Comic	**Harley Quinn**; Lumberjanes; Angela: Queen of Hel; Midnighter; The Wicked + The Divine
Outstanding Reality Program	**I Am Cait** (tie); **I Am Jazz** (tie); New Girls on the Block; The Prancing Elites Project; Transcendent
Outstanding Daily Drama	**The Bold and the Beautiful**

=== Special awards ===
Award	Winner
Ally Award	Mariah Carey (New York night)
Excellence in Media Award	Robert De Niro
Vanguard Award	Demi Lovato
Stephen F. Kolzak Award	Ruby Rose
