= Vito (film) =

American documentary on gay activist Vito Russo

- Directed by: Jeffrey Schwarz
- Produced by: Jeffrey Schwarz; Bryan Singer
- Starring: Vito Russo
- Cinematography: David Quantic
- Edited by: Philip Harrison
- Music by: Miriam Cutler
- Production company: Automat Pictures
- Distributed by: First Run Features
- Release date: October 14, 2011 (New York Film Festival)
- Running time: 93 minutes
- Country: United States
- Language: English

Vito is a 2011 American documentary film produced and directed by Jeffrey Schwarz of the Los Angeles-based production company Automat Pictures. The film documents the life of Vito Russo, gay activist, film scholar, and author of The Celluloid Closet.

Vito premiered at the 2011 New York Film Festival, went on to screen within such festivals as Maryland Film Festival, and made its television debut on HBO in July 2012. The DVD was released by First Run Features in April 2013.

== Cast ==
- Phyllis Antonellis as herself - Vito's cousin
- Richard Barrios as himself - Author (Screened Out: Playing Gay in Hollywood from Edison to Stonewall)
- Edmund Bergler as himself - Psychoanalyst, writer (archive footage) (billed as Edmund Bergler M.D.)
- Richard Berkowitz as himself - Author
- Lenny Bloom as himself - Friend & Lawyer (billed as Leonard Bloom)
- Jay Blotcher as himself - Journalist, writer, publicist, film producer, and activist
- Malcolm Boyd as himself (billed as Reverend Malcolm Boyd)
- Joseph Brewer as himself
- Lee Brewster as himself - Queens Liberation Front (archive footage)
- Tom Brokaw as himself - Journalist (archive footage)
- Marcus A. Conant as himself - Doctor and dermatologist (archive footage)
- Stephen Boyd as (archive footage) Messala
- Billie Burke as (archive footage) Glinda
- George Bancroft as (archive footage) Bill Bailey
- Jane Darwell as (archive footage) Mrs. Winchell - Jack's Mother
- Marcia Pally as herself

== Development and release ==
The film, executive produced by Bryan Singer and produced for HBO Documentary Films, premiered at the 2011 New York Film Festival and made its television debut on HBO in July 2012. It received an Emmy Award for Outstanding Research at the 2013 News and Documentary Emmy Awards, as well as a GLAAD Media Award nomination for Outstanding Documentary. Critically well-received, Vito was hailed by Time Magazine as a document that shows how civil rights and entertainment are "deeply connected." Based on rejuvenated interest in Russo's life and work, Schwarz edited two volumes of Russo's writing entitled Out Spoken: A Vito Russo Reader.
