= Mineshaft: The Cruising Murders =

2026 documentary film

- Film poster
- Directed by: Jeffrey Schwarz
- Produced by: John Boccardo; Jeffrey Schwarz
- Cinematography: Jesse Dana; Brian Wengrofsky
- Edited by: Jeffrey Schwarz
- Music by: Makeup and Vanity Set
- Production companies: Automat Pictures; Blind Faith Productions
- Release date: June 6, 2026 (Tribeca Festival)
- Running time: 85 minutes
- Country: United States
- Language: English

Mineshaft: The Cruising Murders is a 2026 American documentary film about the controversy surrounding William Friedkin's thriller film Cruising (1980). The documentary is edited, produced, and directed by Jeffrey Schwarz. It premiered at the Tribeca Festival on June 6, 2026.

== Reception ==
On the review aggregator website Rotten Tomatoes, 94% of 17 critics' reviews are positive, with an average rating of 7.5/10.

Guy Lodge of Variety wrote that it's an "engaging, impassioned documentary". Ryan Lattanzio of IndieWire gave it an A−, writing, "It must be said that, in an age of Netflix true-crime documentary series that are often three bloated, overlong episodes that could've been consolidated into a 30-minute short, Mineshaft is a masterpiece of economy at well under 90 minutes."
