= Spine Tingler! The William Castle Story =

- Directed by: Jeffrey Schwarz
- Produced by: Jeffrey Schwarz
- Starring: William Castle
- Cinematography: Adam Cindric; Steve Coleman; Robert Elfstrom; Matt Faw; Eugenia Fiumi; David A. Ford; David Hallinger; Chris Meagher; Jim Newport; Mark Putnam; Matt Stell; Clay Westervelt
- Edited by: Philip Harrison; Jeffrey Schwarz
- Music by: Michael Cudahy
- Production company: Automat Pictures
- Release date: November 8, 2007 (AFI Fest)
- Running time: 82 minutes
- Country: United States
- Language: English

Spine Tingler! The William Castle Story is a 2007 American biographical documentary film directed by Jeffrey Schwarz about legendary Hollywood showman William Castle, who specialized in producing low-budget shockers.

== Production ==
Hailed as a "fittingly lively portrait" of its subject, the film features interviews with Castle's daughter Terry, John Waters, Joe Dante, John Landis, Leonard Maltin, Roger Corman, John Badham, Diane Baker, and Marcel Marceau, among others.

== Release ==
Spine Tingler! premiered at the 2007 American Film Institute's AFI Fest and was awarded the Audience Award for Best Documentary. It received many other festival honors and was released as part of the William Castle box set in 2009 by Sony Pictures Home Entertainment. In 2011 the film was released as a stand-alone Special Edition DVD and is currently streaming on Vimeo. It has aired on The Documentary Channel and TCM.

== Reception ==
On review aggregator website Rotten Tomatoes, the film holds an approval rating of 100% based on 6 reviews, with an average rating of 8.2/10.
