= Eddie Muller =

American author and television host (born 1958)

- Muller in 2026
- Born: October 15, 1958 (age 67); San Francisco, California, U.S.
- Education: San Francisco Art Institute
- Occupations: Author; film historian; film preservationist; television host
- Spouse: Kathleen Maria Milne

Eddie Muller (born October 15, 1958) is an American author and the founder and president of the Film Noir Foundation. He is known for his books about the film noir genre and is the host of Noir Alley on Turner Classic Movies (TCM). He is also known by his moniker: the "Czar of Noir".

Born in San Francisco, Muller studied at the San Francisco Art Institute and worked as a bartender. He next worked as a newspaper journalist for nearly two decades. In 1996, Muller wrote his debut nonfiction book Grindhouse with Daniel Faris. Two years later, he wrote Dark City: The Lost World of Film Noir, which explored the "classic period" of American film noir. He wrote a follow-up book Dark City Dames, which detailed six biographies of American film actresses who portrayed notable femmes fatale. Based on the former book, Muller collaborated with the American Cinematheque to program a film festival screening dedicated to film noir. Muller therefore launched the "Noir City" film festival, which screens films across major cities in the United States.

In 2005, Muller founded the Film Noir Foundation, dedicated to preserving and restoring films noir. During the 2010s, he appeared as a host for the TCM Classic Film Festival and Classic Cruise, and in 2013, he appeared with Robert Osborne to present a primetime lineup of films noir. In 2014, Muller was hired as a host for TCM, where he currently hosts the Noir Alley programming block that airs on weekends.

== Early life ==
Muller was born in San Francisco, California to Edward John Vojkovich (renamed Edward Muller, 1907–1982), a boxing sports writer, and Rose Muller (1915–2017). He has three siblings: Bruce, Dean and Deborah. The elder Muller began working for San Francisco Examiner in 1924 as a copy boy. In 1930, he became a sports writer covering West Coast boxing fights in his column "Shadow Boxing". He earned the moniker "Mr. Boxer". He retired from the Examiner in 1976 and died of a heart attack on December 3, 1982.

During the late 1970s, Muller studied at the San Francisco Art Institute. There, he took a "narrative filmmaking" class taught by filmmaker George Kuchar, and filmed a 16 mm student film titled Bay City Blues, homaging the work of Raymond Chandler. It became one of five finalists for the 1979 Student Academy Award. Muller also starred in Kuchar's film Symphony for a Sinner (1979). Meanwhile, he worked as a professional bartender in his hometown. He later followed in his father's career path and worked as a print journalist for 16 years.

== Career ==
=== Author ===
In 1998, Muller wrote Dark City: The Lost World of Film Noir, published by St. Martin's Press. It was nominated for the 1999 Edgar Allan Poe Award for Best Critical/Biographical Work from the Mystery Writers of America. In 2001, Muller published a follow-up book titled Dark City Dames, chronicling six Hollywood actresses—Marie Windsor, Audrey Totter, Jane Greer, Ann Savage, Evelyn Keyes and Coleen Gray—who notably portrayed femmes fatale. In 2005, Muller co-authored the memoir Tab Hunter Confidential with the actor, following a two-year collaboration. The project originated after Hunter had read Muller's profile of his friend Evelyn Keyes in Dark City Dames. Amazed by his precision, Hunter asked him if he would be interested in co-writing his memoir, to which Muller agreed. The book inspired a 2015 documentary film of the same name.

In 2002, Muller published his debut novel, The Distance. Inspired by his father's sports writing career, the novel tells of Billy Nichols, who writes a boxing column for the San Francisco Inquirer. One night, Hack Escalante, a rising boxing star, kills his manager in a fit of rage, and Billy helps to shield Hack from justice. It won the 2003 Shamus Award for the Best First P. I. Novel, from the Private Eye Writers of America (PWA). In 2003, Muller wrote a sequel titled Shadow Boxer, in which Billy is enlisted to help a woman to clear her husband of a murder charge. Meanwhile, Billy investigates the case of a friend who was hurt by a liquor truck.

In 2023, Muller published a cocktail recipe book titled Noir Bar, pairing 50 noir films with a unique cocktail. That same year, he co-authored his first picture book, Kid Noir: Kitty Feral and the Case of the Marshmallow Monkey, with Jessica Schmidt. The Running Press publishing company had approached Muller to write a children's noir book. He had previously written a children's story about a girl who rescues a stray cat, but publishers turned it down because of Muller's background in noir.

=== Film Noir Foundation ===
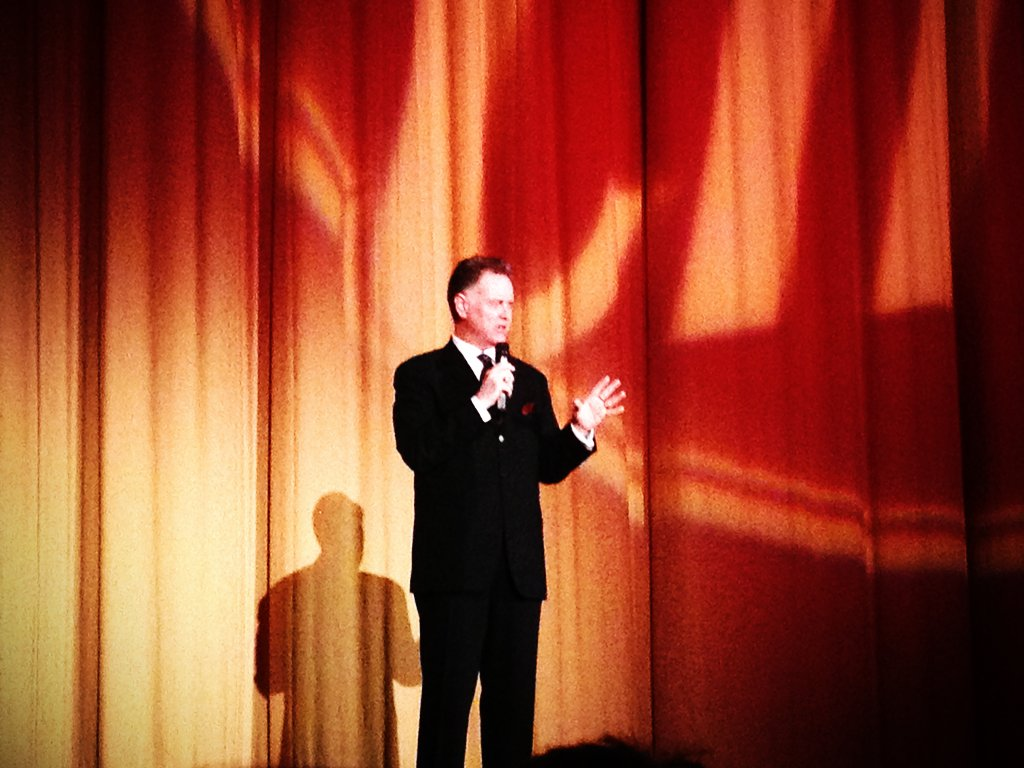
Muller at NOIR CITY X, the 2012 film noir festival at the Castro Theatre, San Francisco

In 1998, Muller was asked by the American Cinematheque to program their annual Festival of Film Noir, inspired by his book Dark City. It was initially hosted at the Egyptian Theater on Hollywood Boulevard. In 2002, the festival, which was renamed "Noir City", moved to San Francisco at the Castro Theater. It became financially successful, and launched satellite festivals in Chicago, Austin, Detroit, Boston, Washington D.C., and Seattle.

In 2020, Muller remembered, "We were ... well quite honestly, we were making so much money at the festival that I was like, 'I gotta do something with this.' I would ask for certain films [from studios] and be told [they] don't have a print. Films were missing, so that's why I elected to use the proceeds from this festival to start the foundation."

In 2005, Muller founded the Film Noir Foundation, a 501(c)(3) non-profit organization created to educate on the "cultural, historical, and artistic significance of film noir as an international cinematic movement." By 2020, the Noir Foundation has restored numerous films, including Too Late for Tears (1949), Woman on the Run (1950), and The Man Who Cheated Himself (1950).

=== Turner Classic Movies ===
Muller first met Robert Osborne, the primetime host of Turner Classic Movies (TCM), at his annual Classic Film Festival in Athens, Georgia, which was intended to raise financing for the Arts Department at the University of Georgia. Charles Tabesh, TCM's vice president of network programming, had noticed the popularity of their noir programming during their live events, such as the TCM Classic Film Festival and the Classic Cruise. Shortly after, Tabesh offered Muller a non-exclusive contract to present film noir programming on the network.

In January 2013, Muller co-hosted a four-film primetime marathon block titled "A Night in Noir City" with Osborne. The featured films included Cry Danger (1951), 99 River Street (1953), Tomorrow Is Another Day (1951), and The Breaking Point (1950). In June of the same year, he hosted the network's "Friday Night Spotlight," highlighting 16 noir films with adapted stories from Dashiell Hammett, David Goodis, James M. Cain, Jonathan Latimer, Cornell Woolrich, and Raymond Chandler.

In January 2014, Muller stated he had been hired as an on-air host for TCM during his annual "Noir City" festival. A year later, from June 5 to July 24, 2015, he hosted a Summer of Darkness festival block, which aired 24 hours of noir films on Fridays. Most notably, it premiered newly restored editions of Woman on the Run (1950) and Too Late for Tears (1949), with restoration work funded by the Film Noir Foundation and the Hollywood Foreign Press Association. In conjunction, he also taught a free online course of the same name (with Prof. Richard Edwards of Ball State University).

In March 2017, Muller began hosting a film noir programming block titled Noir Alley, with The Maltese Falcon (1941) as its first broadcast. As of 2026, it broadcasts on Saturday nights and repeats on Sunday mornings at 10:00 a.m. Eastern Time.

== Personal life ==
Muller is married to Kathleen Marie Milne. He lives in Alameda, California.

== Books ==
=== Nonfiction ===
- (with Daniel Faris) Grindhouse: The Forbidden World of "Adults Only" Cinema (1996); ISBN 0-312-14609-4
- Dark City: The Lost World of Film Noir (1998); ISBN 0-312-18076-4
- Dark City Dames: The Wicked Women of Film Noir (2001); ISBN 0-06-039369-6
- The Art Of Noir: The Posters & Graphics From The Classical Era Of Film Noir (2004); ISBN 1-58567-603-9
- (with Tab Hunter) Tab Hunter Confidential: The Making of a Movie Star (2005); ISBN 1-56512-548-7
- Gun Crazy: The Origin of American Outlaw Cinema (2014); ISBN 978-0-692-26026-5
- Dark City: The Lost World of Film Noir (Revised and Expanded Edition) (2021); ISBN 978-0-762-49897-0
- Eddie Muller's Noir Bar: Cocktails Inspired by the World of Film Noir (2023); ISBN 978-0-762-48062-3
- Dark City Dames: The Women Who Defined Film Noir (Revised and Expanded Edition) (2025); ISBN 978-0-762-48826-1

=== Fiction ===
- The Distance (2002); ISBN 0-7432-1443-9
- Shadow Boxer (2003); ISBN 0-7432-1444-7
- Kid Noir: Kitty Feral and the Case of the Marshmallow Monkey (2023); ISBN 978-0-762-48168-2
