= Women in Blue (film) =

2021 film directed by Deirdre Fishel

Women In Blue
- Directed by: Deirdre Fishel
- Release date: 2021 (United States)
- Country: United States
- Language: English

Women In Blue is a 2021 American documentary film directed by Deirdre Fishel. The film follows four women who worked for the Minneapolis Police Department. The four officers describe the differences between how male officers and female officers conduct themselves.
