= Sahara Lotti =

Iranian American screenwriter and actress (born 1977)

- Born: June 3, 1977 (age 48)
- Occupation: Entrepreneur
- Known for: Patenting cosmetic technology
- Title: CEO of Lashify
- Website: lashify.com

Sahara Lotti (born June 3, 1977) is an Iranian-American CEO and founder of Lashify, a luxury beauty company. She is known for inventing and patenting cosmetic technologies, most notably DIY eyelash extensions.

== Early life and education ==
Raised in the San Francisco Bay Area in the town of Atherton, California. She attended Menlo-Atherton High School. After graduation, Lotti moved to Los Angeles and attended the University of Southern California (USC). In addition to her regular classes, Lotti studied with Hollywood acting coach, Ivana Chubbuck. Lotti also informally studied music and singing for numerous years, showing passion and talent for blues and jazz music.

In her early career, Lotti acted in a series of independent films and wrote several scripts, including the comedies A Family Affair, WishBoned, and Back Magick. In 2010, Lotti adapted the British novel The Ex Files for CBS Films.

== Lashify ==
In the 2010s, Lotti began developing patented DIY eyelash extensions that were easier to apply and looked more natural. This led to her invention of a "wand" applicator that would allow lash extensions to be placed on the underside of the lashline in a more natural pattern. In 2016, Lotti founded the luxury beauty brand, Lashify, with her own money. The company is most well-known for developing the Gossamer lash and Fuse Control Wand, used to apply vegan silk eyelashes. It also develops color cosmetics and other beauty products. The company's products are cruelty-free.

When the company was first founded, Lotti demonstrated the products on social media as a way to build interest and attract customers. As of 2023, the company had reached $80 million in annual sales. It opened its first physical location at Melrose Place, Los Angeles in 2024.

The brand is widely used by makeup artists in the film, television, modelling, and influencer industries. Vivian Baker used Lashify while styling Charlize Theron, who portrayed Megyn Kelly in the film, Bombshell (2019), winning the 92nd Academy Award for Best Makeup and Hairstyling. The brand was also used for Charli XCX's makeup in the "360" music video for the album Brat.

=== Intellectual property lawsuits and patents ===
Lashify holds over 750 patents and 1,000 trademarks worldwide. The company has filed numerous lawsuits alleging infringement on the company'sintellectual property. Regarding the litigation, Lotti has stated "What is really the point of any of the IP stuff in beauty if it’s simply that easy to copy and no one respects it? You have to be a millionaire to even have a chance."

In August 2020, Lotti asked the International Trade Commission (ITC) to investigate the unlawful importation of false lash systems. Her complaint alleged these systems infringe on their patents by copying its technology without license. In October 2020, the International Trade Commission (ITC) launched the investigation into Lashify's patent-infringement complaint. After the ITC initially ruled against Lashify, Lotti filed an appeal with the United States Court of Appeals for the Federal Circuit. The circuit court ruled that Lashify should have qualified for patent protection. This ruling created a legal precedent that would broaden the types of complainants who are eligible to seek relief from the ITC when their patents are infringed.

In May 2020, Lotti filed a lawsuit against Qingdao Hollyren Cosmetics Company alleging misuse of her patented technology. This suit was the first time that a female-owned beauty company took legal action in China against competing manufacturers. In August 2024, the United States District Court for the Western District of Texas awarded Lashify $30.5 million in damages from Qingdao Lashbeauty Cosmetic Co, along with 30% royalties from Qingdao.

== Other work ==
In 2020, Lotti founded a startup incubator to invest in Black-owned beauty businesses.

=== Animal wellness ===
In 2010, Lotti founded Bobzilla, a non-profit organization that researches and supports animal wellness, including natural medicine and healthier breeding practices for breeds like English bulldogs. Lotti has stated that she founded the Lashify company to earn money that could be invested into animal wellness research.

== Personal life ==
Lotti has three dogs, Roberto, Bob and Mack.
