= Automat Pictures =

American film and television production company

- Industry: Entertainment
- Founded: 2000; 26 years ago
- Founder: Jeffrey Schwarz
- Headquarters: Los Angeles, United States
- Key people: Jeffrey Schwarz (President & CEO)
- Services: Film production; television production; Blu-ray/DVD
- Website: www.automatpictures.com

Automat Pictures is an American film and television production company based in Los Angeles, focusing on the production of independent films, original television programming, EPK, and Blu-ray and DVD added value. It was founded in 2000 by producer/director Jeffrey Schwarz.
