= Dark Horse (1992 film) =

1992 drama film by David Hemings

- Poster
- Directed by: David Hemmings
- Written by: Janet McClean
- Produced by: Allan Glaser; Tab Hunter
- Starring: Ed Begley Jr. Mimi Rogers; Ari Meyers; Donovan Leitch
- Cinematography: Steve Yaconelli
- Music by: Roger Bellon
- Release date: July 17, 1992
- Running time: 94 minutes
- Country: United States
- Language: English

Dark Horse is a 1992 American drama film directed by David Hemmings. The screenplay by Janet Maclean was adapted from an original story by Tab Hunter, who also co-produced and played a supporting role.

== Plot ==
The plot focuses on new-girl-in-town Allison Mills, a teenager whose mother recently died. When she hangs out with the wrong crowd, she gets into trouble and is sentenced to community service at a local stable. There she comes to love spending time with the animals until an automobile accident disables her and her favorite horse Jet. The wheelchair-using girl learns to overcome her handicap through the indomitable spirit of the horse, who overcomes the odds and runs again.

== Principal cast ==
- Ed Begley Jr. as Jack Mills
- Mimi Rogers as Dr. Susan Hadley
- Ari Meyers as Allison Mills
- Donovan Leitch as J.B. Hadley
- Brooke Cuskey as Amy
- Samantha Eggar as Mrs. Curtis
- Natasha Gregson Wagner as Martha
- Tab Hunter as Perkins
- Tisha Sterling as Officer Ross

== Production ==
This film was the second project brought to the screen (the first being Lust in the Dust) by Glaser/Hunter Productions, owned by Tab Hunter and his life partner Allan Glaser.

Hunter, an avid horse rider and owner, was inspired for his story by an Arabian horse that was used as a double in the 1979 film The Black Stallion. After breaking his leg, the animal spent a full year recuperating in a sling. Although he never walked properly again, when set loose he could run with no problem.

Director Hemmings insisted on shooting in his home base of Sun Valley, Idaho, where he was surrounded by an entourage offering strong support. He drank heavily during filming, and often was barely functional at the end of the day. Producer Allan Glaser tolerated his erratic and boorish behavior only because the dailies were so good.

Tab Hunter was taken aback when he met Natasha Gregson Wagner on this film, as she was the daughter of Natalie Wood—his co-star in two 1950s films (The Burning Hills and The Girl He Left Behind)—and the woman who Warner Bros. was trying to romantically link to him in the 50s:

Ross Brown, our casting director, excitedly called us from Hollywood about an actress he’d just auditioned for the role of Allison’s best friend, Martha. She was wonderful, he said, but completely inexperienced. We trusted Ross’s instincts and told him to send her photo along for our approval.

“My God,” I exclaimed when I saw the photo, “it’s Natalie!”

I wasn’t far off. Natasha Gregson Wagner was Natalie Wood’s twenty-year-old daughter, born during her mother’s marriage to British agent Richard Gregson. We met Natasha for dinner upon her arrival in Sun Valley. The moment I heard her laugh, it sent shivers through me. “You sound just like your mother,” I told her.

Natasha had no idea how close I’d been to her mom—and no interest in riding those coattails. I’m sure Natalie would never have imagined that it would be her “boyfriend” from a bygone era who’d give her daughter her initial film role.

— Tab Hunter, Tab Hunter Confidential

The film was shown at the 1992 Cannes Film Festival. It was released theatrically on July 17, 1992.

== Critical reception ==
TV Guide wrote the film "does succeed in presenting a tale of overcoming adversity and growing up. The most affecting scene is between Brooke Cuskey and Meyers. Cuskey plays Amy, a young girl who's been on crutches her whole life. She gives Allison her crutches and very assertively tells her to stand up. Director David Hemmings has presented this exchange in a way that is straightforward and not sappy. The rest of the cast is equally competent. "

== See also ==
- List of films about horses

== Works cited ==
- Hunter, Tab; Muller, Eddie (January 1, 2005). Tab Hunter Confidential: The Making of a Movie Star. Algonquin Books. ISBN 978-1565124660.
