= James Bond 007: Light of My Death =

- Dark Horse Comics #10 (1993) featuring James Bond 007: Light of My Death cover art by Paul Gulacy and Egon Selby

Publication information
- Publisher: Dark Horse Comics
- Genre: Spy; Action/Adventure
- Publication date: 1 March 1993 - 1 June 1993
- No. of issues: 4
- Main character: James Bond

Creative team
- Written by: Das Petrou
- Artist: John Watkiss
- Letterer: Woodrow Phoenix
- Colorist: Trevor Goring
- Editor(s): Bob Cooper; Jerry Prosser; Dick Hansom

Light of My Death is a 1993 spy comic book featuring Ian Fleming's secret agent, James Bond, in the central role of the plot, written by Das Petrou and illustrated by John Watkiss. It was published by Dark Horse Comics in issues #8-11 of Dark Horse Comics. It includes the return of a Bond girl from a Fleming novel, Tatiana Romanova from From Russia, with Love (1957).

== Plot ==
The story begins at the French Alps where a British intelligence agent, Dennis Rogers, was sent to rendezvous with a Swiss banker, investigating the eastern trade corporation and its links to a man called Lewis Loizou using its funds to run an arms dealing business. But, before the banker could unveil more, the gondola they are in is cut off from its cable by a laser beam in the employ of a mysterious assassin and they both fall down the valley to their deaths.

James Bond is sent to France on behalf of the fallen operative formerly assigned to the case to resume the investigation where he meets up with the local MI6 station chief, Commander Rattray, who informs him that the suspects behind the scheme and the murder of Rogers at the Alps points at the Soviets, covering the tracks of their own man, assuming to be Loizou and his connections with an agricultural corporation based in Hong Kong when financial irregularities had captured the attentions of several people. Bond decides to examine the crime scene, first, where the cable car landed and the two men from the incident ended up killed, only to be soon chased by a black ops Soviet assassin unit force on skis and be saved by Tatiana Romanova right on time, who herself has been reinstated as a KGB operative after the confusing events regarding the Lektor case a few years back. 007 is told by Tatiana that her people are as puzzled as the British are, hence she is assigned to investigate the death of a Swiss Banker who was revealed to be the keeper of KGB's foreign currency reserve.

The Hong Kong station gathered intelligence that a man called Amos is behind all the scheme that has been developing the assassination of worldwide government delegates to foil the convention from taking effect between non-aligned countries in Cairo to uncover who has been toying with the international currency market which put hundreds of millions of dollars to drain that circulate around improving corporal means around the globe. Bond spies on a meeting at South China Sea upon which Amos's yacht was floating, discovering that a corrupt American businessman called David Wilson was involved in laundering the money stolen from both the US and Soviet funds. Additionally, 007 directly overhears the association they have with the professional assassin who murdered Rogers and the banker at the French Alps. Bond is discovered soon and flees away from the hands of the goons in the employment of Amos.

After arriving in Egypt, Bond reunites with Tatiana to prevent the assassination of the delegates at Giza at the hands of the assassin whose weapon of choice, a "portable laser gun", fascinates 007. Before the governmental gathering is due, Major Boothroyd pilots a remote controlled passengerless helicopter disguised as the chopper carrying the officials heading over to the conference meeting point and explodes it nearby the head of the Great Sphinx, in order to confuse the assassin and lure him out of the shadows. Bond climbs on top of the Sphinx and exposes the assassin with a laser rifle, then clashes with him and dispatches him by kicking him off the ledge. While debriefing the mission back in London, 'M' informs Bond that they have little amount of information regarding Amos and his operations, other than absconding a large slice of the US' financial aid at South East Asia, but nevertheless is grateful that 007 prevented the assassination and removed one of the most wanted killers from the face of the world.

Mr. Amos

== See also ==
- James Bond (comics)
- Outline of James Bond
