= Tatiana Romanova =

Fictional spy in the James Bond story "From Russia with Love"

- James Bond character
- Created by: Ian Fleming
- Portrayed by: Daniela Bianchi (film)
- Voiced by: Barbara Jefford (film); Kari Wahlgren (video game)

In-universe information
- Gender: Female
- Affiliation: KGB (novel) and SPECTRE (film)
- Classification: Bond girl / Henchwoman

Tatiana Alexeievna "Tania" Romanova is a fictional character in the 1957 James Bond novel From Russia, with Love, its 1963 film adaptation and the 2005 video game based on both.

She is played by Daniela Bianchi in the film, with her voice dubbed in by Barbara Jefford.

== Novel and film biography ==
Tatiana Alexeievna Romanova (played in the film From Russia with Love by Daniela Bianchi) is introduced as a corporal in Soviet Army Intelligence, newly assigned to work in the Soviet consulate in Istanbul as a cipher clerk. Her superiors, in connection with the Soviet agency SMERSH, plan to sow dissension in the intelligence community by murdering and discrediting a significant figure in Western intelligence. The target is James Bond (Sean Connery), who works for MI6.

Her commanding officer is Rosa Klebb (Lotte Lenya). In the novel From Russia, with Love, Klebb is actually commander in chief of the Otdyel II section of SMERSH. In the screenplay adaptation, Klebb has defected and is secretly an agent for SPECTRE – who manipulates Romanova into believing that she is on an important mission for her country, when she is in fact merely a pawn in the terrorist organisation's latest bid to destroy MI6.

Romanova's mission is to seduce Bond and have him take her to England to deliver a code machine (a Spektor in the novel, a Lektor in the film), as well as planting false information, before being rescued from prison and returned to the USSR. She is promised a promotion to the rank of captain if she completes the mission.

Once in Istanbul, she contacts Darko Kerim (named Ali Kerim Bey in the film and portrayed by Pedro Armendáriz) and tells him her plans: she will voluntarily defect from the Soviet Union and take the machine with her, but only if Bond assists in the operation. She claims to have fallen in love with Bond and developed a desire to live with him after seeing his picture in a secret file.

Both M (Bernard Lee) and Bond believe the offer to be a trap, but the prize is valuable enough to pursue it. They react just as the main instigator of the SPECTRE plot, chess champion Kronsteen (Vladek Sheybal), had predicted. Bond flies to Istanbul and contacts Kerim, spending several days there and waiting for contact. After a riotous fight at a Gypsy camp, Bond returns to his hotel room and finds Romanova walking across the room and getting into his bed, wearing only a black velvet choker and black stockings. They make love, but are secretly filmed by Klebb's men via a one-way mirror. The film is meant to be used to embarrass MI6.

In the novel, they board the Orient Express train with Kerim, planning to travel to England over the course of four days. Kerim is killed by a Soviet agent named Benz who had boarded the train earlier and is also killed in the struggle. This prompts the bombing of the Soviet consulate in Istanbul in retaliation. Despite this, Bond elects not to leave the train for a plane or the consulate, after having fallen for Romanova and not wanting to cut their time short. Red Grant, an agent recruited by Klebb for SMERSH, pretends to be Nash, an MI6 agent sent by M in response to the death of Kerim. After sedating Romanova, under the guise of standing guard over Bond, he waits until they are both asleep, and plans to murder them. However, due to his vanity, he taunts Bond, revealing details of a meeting with Rosa Klebb. This allows Bond to disarm Grant and save Romanova's life. It is unclear as to what ultimately becomes of Tatiana in the novel as in her last appearance, she is still heavily affected by the sedatives, sleeping in the British consulate, while Bond confronts Klebb. It is presumed that she has been arrested and/or released by the British.

In the film, after meeting Romanova again to verify the authenticity of her information, Bond and Kerim blow up the Soviet consulate in Istanbul to cover their escape. With the help of Kerim, Bond and Romanova board the Orient Express train and depart for Trieste and the Italian frontier. As a part of Kronsteen's SPECTRE strategy, the assassin Donovan "Red" Grant (Robert Shaw) kills Kerim. Bond contacts Grant, who is pretending to be a British agent named Nash. After sedating Romanova, "Nash" reveals his real identity to Bond, who then fights Grant in the train compartment. Prior to the fight, Grant explains that he is going to kill Bond and then execute the sleeping Romanova with Bond's gun, making it look like a murder-suicide. Bond defeats Grant and takes Romanova to Venice. It is there they meet Klebb again who, in an attempt to retrieve the code machine and kill Bond, disguises herself as a maid and tries to eliminate the agent with a dagger-tipped shoe poisoned with blowfish venom. Romanova shoots Klebb, thus saving Bond. She and Bond are last seen on a boat in Venice, with Bond dropping the incriminating film into the canal.

== Analysis ==
The characters of Romanova and Grant exist in juxtaposition to one another, with both being defectors from their respective nations, and it was the intention of Ian Fleming in writing From Russia, with Love to contrast these two characters as a way of justifying the moral superiority of Great Britain over the Soviet Union. In the 1950s, there were real fears in the West that Communism might be the more efficient system, and the Soviet Union would pull ahead both economically and technologically over the West. The Burgess-Maclean affair of 1951, when two senior British diplomats, Donald Maclean and Guy Burgess, defected to the Soviet Union, added to these fears. At the time, it was not widely known that Maclean and Burgess were spies for the Soviet Union and Maclean was on the brink of being arrested on charges of treason. The Soviet government claimed that Maclean and Burgess had defected because life was better in the Soviet Union while the British government was content to go along with this explanation rather than admit that two senior diplomats had been spies for the Soviet Union for the better part of the last twenty years. Since Maclean and Burgess were both members of "the Establishment", having attended public schools and Cambridge University; the defection of the two attracted much attention at the time. Fleming's intention in writing From Russia with Love was at least in part to promote a "West is the best" message by creating two parallel characters who would prove Western superiority over the Soviet Union. Throughout the novel, Fleming drew contrasts between the Soviet Union and the West, always to the benefit of the latter. For an example, the officers of SMERSH are portrayed as living in fear of their superiors while relations between MI6 officers are shown as warm and friendly.

Romanova's life in Moscow as a low-ranking clerk for the MGB is portrayed as dull and stifling. Although as a member of the MGB Romanova enjoys a relatively privileged lifestyle and she is an attractive young woman, she complains that her MGB uniform makes it hard for her to make friends, as people fear her. All of Romanova's superiors are portrayed as twisted and hideous; Rosa Klebb is an ugly woman with a "toad-like figure" and a lesbian (who is shown to be attracted to Romanova), while Kronsteen is a bisexual who is labelled "a monster" in the book. The book makes it clear that people such as Klebb and Kronsteen are the norm in the Soviet system. In the 1950s, homosexuality and bisexuality were widely considered to be perversions and Fleming, by making most of his non-Russian characters straight in contrast to most of the Russian characters, used this as part of his strategy to show "the West is the best".

However despite her repulsive superiors in the MGB, Romanova is portrayed as a committed communist who is at the same time vaguely unhappy with her existence – as Fleming wrote: "The Romanov blood might well have given a yearning for men other than that type of modern Russian officer she would meet-stern, cold, mechanical, basically hysterical and because of their Party education infernally dull". Upon meeting Bond, she abandons her belief in communism as she sees the advantage of a Western lifestyle, while also finding Bond a much better lover than her previous, Russian, lovers. Romanova falling in love with Bond is portrayed as both a political and sexual liberation for her. The way that Bond literally and metaphorically seduces Romanova over to the West was intended by Fleming to show the superiority of the Western world and western political ideologies. Romanova even prefers Bond for his smell as Fleming portrays Russian men as refusing to bathe and hence have unpleasant body odours. The book's message that only men from the West like Bond can really sexually satisfy Romanova was another aspect of Fleming's "the West is the best" message.

In contrast to Romanova, who chooses life in the West over life in the Soviet Union, the book's villain, Grant, goes in the opposite direction. Grant is described as a man from Northern Ireland who joined the British Army in the late 1940s, an experience which briefly contained his insanity and his love of killing. After Grant is disciplined for his vicious style as a boxer, he decides to defect to the Soviet Union as: "He liked all he heard about the Russians, their brutality, their carelessness of human life, and their guile and he decided to go over to them". Grant rides on a motorcycle to a Red Army post in East Germany and says: "I am expert in killing people. I do it very well. I like it". Grant narrowly avoids being executed out of hand by the Soviets, who eventually decide to accept his offer. Having proven himself, he becomes the top assassin for SMERSH, a man who kills happily both because he is insane and because killing is the only thing he knows how to do well. In contrast to the soft and feminine Romanova, who really wants to be in love with a man who causes her to choose the West despite her privileged existence in Moscow, the hard and masculine Grant chooses the Eastern bloc because it is the only system where a perverted, violent man like himself can flourish.

The 1963 film somewhat altered the novel's message by making SPECTRE rather than SMERSH the main antagonist. The Grant of the film is depoliticised, becoming a murderer who was acquitted by reason of insanity, escapes from a mental institution and comes to serve as an assassin for a criminal organisation, instead of a soldier who broke his oath to serve King and Country by defecting to the Soviet Union. The Romanova of the film is much closer to the Romanova of the book, she is shown as thoroughly enjoying the consumerist lifestyle of the West, constantly buying expensive clothing that Bond introduces her to. As in the book, her relationship with Bond serves as both a political and a sexual liberation. Unlike in the book, Romanova of the film makes a more clear decision to choose the West by shooting Klebb in the film's climax to save Bond, a decision made more significant as Romanova is unaware that Klebb is really working for SPECTRE. The theme of defection does not play the same central role in the film as it does in the novel. The film's message, that the obsessive struggle between MI6 and the MGB allows a criminal organisation like SPECTRE to flourish, seems to be a criticism of the Cold War. The Cuban Missile Crisis of 1962 had occurred the previous year, and the film's message is that though the Soviet Union might be an enemy, it is best to keep the level of hostilities down to a manageable level. The fact that Romanova in the film, as in the book, chooses the West was meant to prove Western superiority, but at the same time the film seems to be cautioning against excessively anti-Communist policies.

Helena Bassil-Morosow suggests that

Tatiana's representation throughout the film is marked by a lack of agency, and this is independent of the types of media and focalisation through which she appears to the audience. She is not shown to be displaying the physical prowess, weapon handling or intellectual agility required of a professional spy, but the multiple focalised gaze lingers on her slender figure, tight-fitting or sheer clothes and pretty face.

According to the film's producer Cubby Broccoli, Ian Fleming modelled Romanova on Anna Kutusova, a Russian involved in the Metro-Vickers Affair.

== Other media ==
The character's role in the video game adaptation of From Russia With Love is more or less the same as in the novel and film, the only major difference being that she is now an unwitting double agent for a terrorist organization called "OCTOPUS". She is voiced by Kari Wahlgren.

The character also appears in the 1993 James Bond comic book that takes place after the events of From Russia With Love, called Light of My Death, in which she is reinstated as a KGB agent, aiding Bond in his mission against a shadowy villain who wants to provoke a war between the Soviets and the West.

An early unused script for the 1977 film The Spy Who Loved Me by Cary Bates featured Bond (Roger Moore) and Tatiana Romanova teaming up to stop a SPECTRE hijacking of a nuclear submarine coordinated by Hugo Drax from a base underneath Loch Ness.

== Bibliography ==
- Takors, Jones (2010). "'The Russians could not longer be the heavies' From Russia with Love and the Cold War in the Bond Series". In Barbara Korte; Eva Ulrike Pirker & Sissy Helff (eds.). Facing the East in the West: Images of Eastern Europe in British Literature, Film and Culture. London: Rodopi. pp. 219–232. ISBN 978-9042030497.
