= Allan Glaser =

American film producer

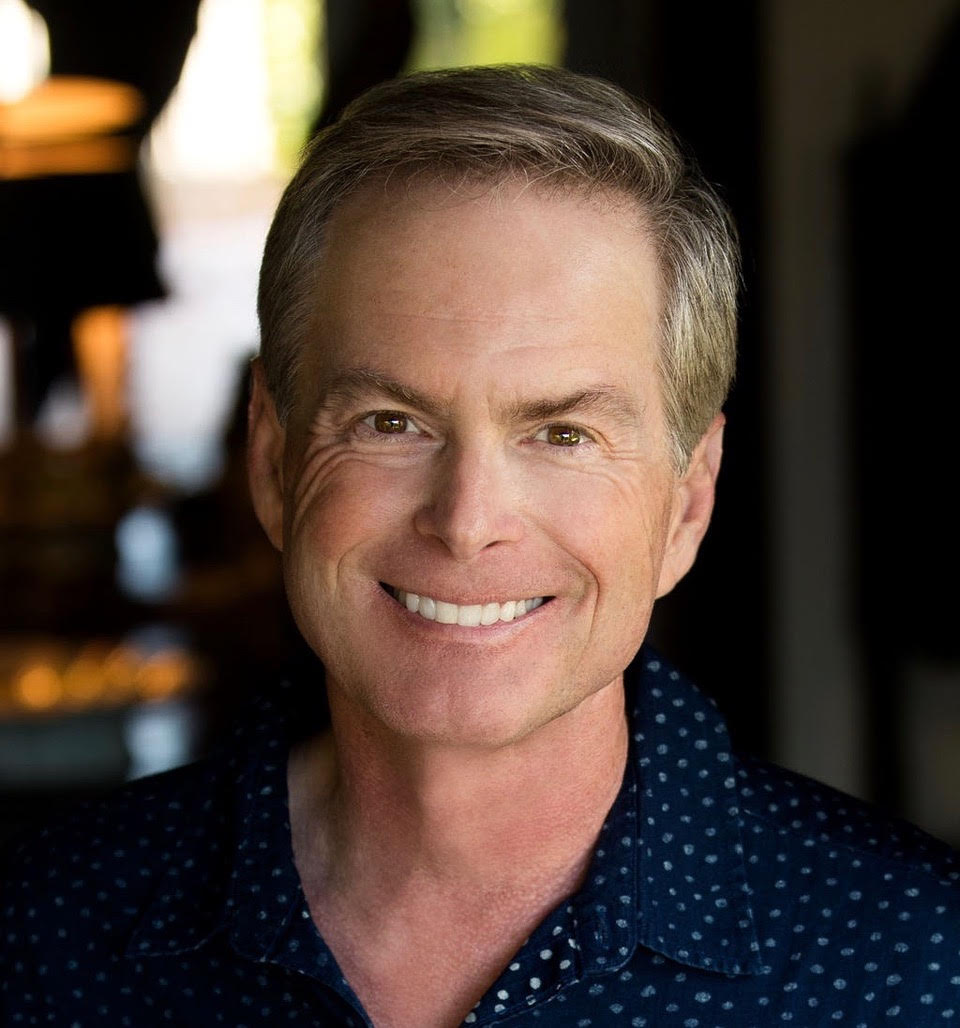
- Glaser in 2019
- Born: November 28, 1959 (age 66); Norfolk, Virginia, USA
- Education: University of Southern California
- Spouse: Tab Hunter (m. 2013; died 2018)

Allan Glaser (born November 28, 1959) is an American film producer known for the feature films Lust in the Dust and Tab Hunter Confidential.

== Production career and Tab Hunter ==
Glaser ultimately became director of acquisitions of feature films at 20th Century Fox. It was while in this position he met Tab Hunter. The two formed Fox Run Productions and raised money to produce the film Lust in the Dust, released in 1985, starring Hunter, Divine, and Lainie Kazan. Glaser's next film, Dark Horse, was based on a story by Hunter. The feature starred Mimi Rogers and Ed Begley, Jr. It premiered at the Cannes Film Festival.

Glaser talked Hunter into writing his autobiography, Tab Hunter Confidential, which became a New York Times bestseller. Glaser turned the book into a documentary in 2015, also entitled Tab Hunter Confidential. In June 2018, The Hollywood Reporter announced that Glaser would produce a feature film for Paramount Pictures based on the documentary with Bad Robot Productions/J. J. Abrams tentatively entitled Tab & Tony.

== Personal life ==
Glaser is Jewish. He and Tab Hunter began a relationship in 1983 and remained together for the next 35 years until Hunter's death in July 2018. They were married in 2013.
