= The Girl He Left Behind =

1956 film by David Butler

- Poster
- Directed by: David Butler
- Written by: Guy Trosper
- Based on: The Girl He Left Behind; or All Quiet in the Third Platoon; 1956 novel by Marion Hargrove
- Starring: Tab Hunter; Natalie Wood; Jessie Royce Landis
- Cinematography: Ted D. McCord
- Edited by: Irene Morra
- Music by: Roy Webb
- Production company: Warner Bros. Pictures
- Distributed by: Warner Bros. Pictures
- Release date: October 26, 1956 (U.S.)
- Running time: 103 minutes
- Country: United States
- Language: English
- Box office: $1.4 million

The Girl He Left Behind is a 1956 American romantic comedy film starring Tab Hunter and Natalie Wood. The supporting cast includes Jim Backus, Alan King, James Garner, and David Janssen. The film was written by Guy Trosper and directed by David Butler, and was filmed at Fort Ord, California. For both Garner and King, it was their third movie.

== Plot ==
Andy Schaeffer is a spoiled mama's boy who usually gets his way. He breezes through college, while girlfriend Susan Daniels works hard at a job to pay for her education. She is not sure where their relationship is going. Andy's grades begin to worsen, and he is being drafted by the army. Andy reports for basic training at Fort Ord, making it clear to everybody there that he would rather be anyplace else.

== Cast ==
- Tab Hunter as Private / Corporal Andy Schaeffer
- Natalie Wood as Susan
- Jessie Royce Landis as Mrs. Schaeffer
- Jim Backus as Sergeant Hanna
- Murray Hamilton as Sergeant Clyde
- Henry Jones as Hanson
- Alan King as Majors
- James Garner as Preston
- David Janssen as Captain Genaro

== Production ==
Marion Hargrove had a huge success with his book See Here, Private Hargrove, which sold 3,500,000 copies. Warner Bros. Pictures approached him to see if he would write a story about a draftee in the army in peacetime.

Hargrove agreed but wanted the story to be accurate, as he had left the army in 1945. He arranged through Warners to undertake enlistment and some basic training at Fort Ord. Hargrove told Warners he had enough material for the book. The studio paid him to write the novel and retained only the screen rights.

The novel was published in 1956. Hargrove wanted to call it All Quiet in the Third Platoon, but Warners preferred The Girl He Left Behind.

Tab Hunter and Natalie Wood had appeared in The Burning Hills together, and Warner Bros. was keen to build them into an on-screen team.

Filming started May 1956. Much of the film was shot at Fort Ord and used real soldiers. "We had a very nice company and a very nice cast," said director David Butler, who claims he recommended James Garner play the lead, but had to accept Hunter.

Tab Hunter recalled, "David Butler was more of a traffic cop than a director, keeping us on time, under budget, and thoroughly uninspired. The most memorable thing about the film was the supporting cast, brimming with more fresh talent: James Garner, David Janssen, Alan King, Henry Jones, and Murray Hamilton — all destined for long careers."

Hunter said Natalie's Wood's "development" since The Burning Hills "was incredible. She became freer with herself in the way she used her face and body. She was maturing as a woman and an actress, and while her mother drilled her to never bite the hand that fed her... she privately groused about being stuck in such a tiny, lame role, unworthy of an Oscar nominee."

James Garner had a small role. He later said the film "was awful and I was awful, but it was the best I could do at the time."

== Reception ==
Variety said "Film, with sometimes serious overtones, is mainly episodic and smacks of the service comedies turned out during World War II, but provides entertaining fare for the youthful and family trade."

The film was the 72nd highest-grossing film of 1957.

== See also ==
- List of American films of 1956
