= Tab Hunter =

American actor, singer, film producer, and author (1931–2018)

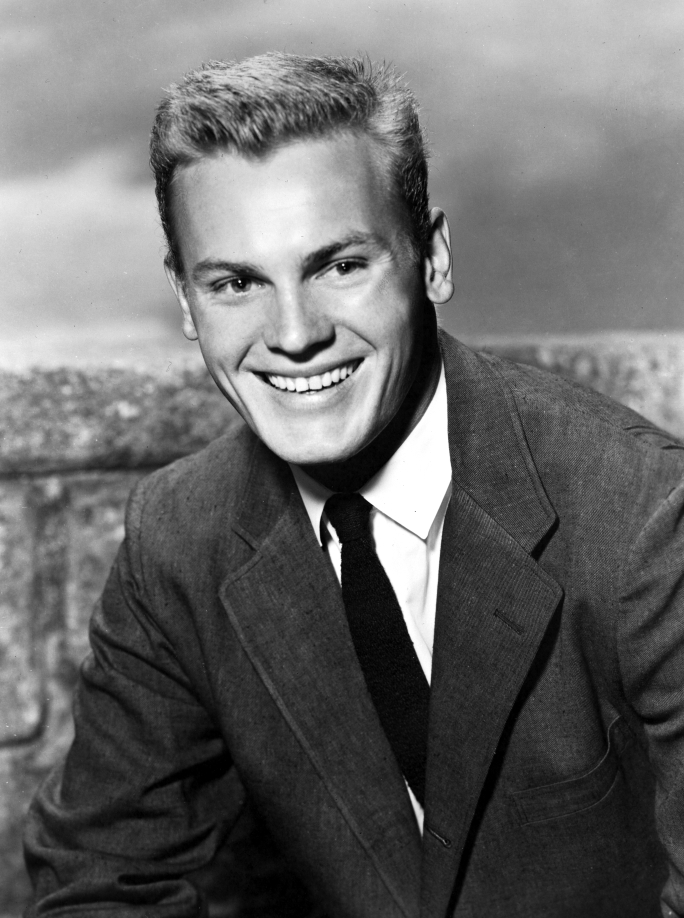
- Hunter in 1956
- Born: Arthur Andrew Kelm; July 11, 1931; Manhattan, New York City, U.S.
- Died: July 8, 2018 (aged 86); Santa Barbara, California, U.S.
- Resting place: Santa Barbara Cemetery, California, U.S.
- Other name: Art Gelien
- Occupations: Actor; singer; film producer; writer
- Years active: 1950–2015
- Spouse: Allan Glaser (m. 2013)
- Website: tabhunter.com

Tab Hunter (born Arthur Andrew Kelm; July 11, 1931 – July 8, 2018) was an American actor, singer, film producer, and author. Known for his blond hair and clean-cut good looks, Hunter starred in more than forty films. During the 1950s and 1960s, Hunter was a Hollywood heartthrob, acting in numerous roles and appearing on the covers of hundreds of magazines. His notable screen credits include Battle Cry (1955), The Girl He Left Behind (1956), Gunman's Walk (1958), Damn Yankees (1958), Polyester (1981), and Lust in the Dust (1985). Hunter also had a music career in the late 1950s; in 1957, he released the no. 1 hit single "Young Love". Hunter's 2005 autobiography, Tab Hunter Confidential: The Making of a Movie Star, was a New York Times bestseller.

== Early life ==
Arthur Andrew Kelm was born in Manhattan, New York City, the son of Gertrude (née Gelien) and Charles Kelm. Kelm's father was Jewish, and his mother was a German immigrant from Hamburg. (Note: A 2003 interview with The New York Times states that Hunter's parents were both German immigrants, and that his mother was Lutheran. However, his obituary from The Guardian states that only his mother was a German immigrant and adds that she was Catholic.) He had an older brother, Walter. Kelm's father was reportedly abusive. Within a few years of Kelm's birth, his parents divorced. He was raised in California, living with his mother, his brother, and his maternal grandparents, John Henry and Ida (née Sonnenfleth) Gelien; the family resided in San Francisco, Long Beach and Los Angeles. His mother re-assumed her maiden surname, Gelien, and changed her sons' surnames as well. As a teenager, Arthur Gelien (as he was then known) was a figure skater, competing in both singles and pairs. Gelien was sent to Catholic school by his religious mother.

Gelien joined the United States Coast Guard at age fifteen in 1946, lying about his age to enlist. While in the Coast Guard, he gained the nickname "Hollywood" for his penchant for watching movies rather than going to bars while on liberty. When his superiors discovered his true age, they discharged him. Gelien met actor Dick Clayton socially; Clayton suggested that he become an actor.

== Career ==
=== 1950s ===
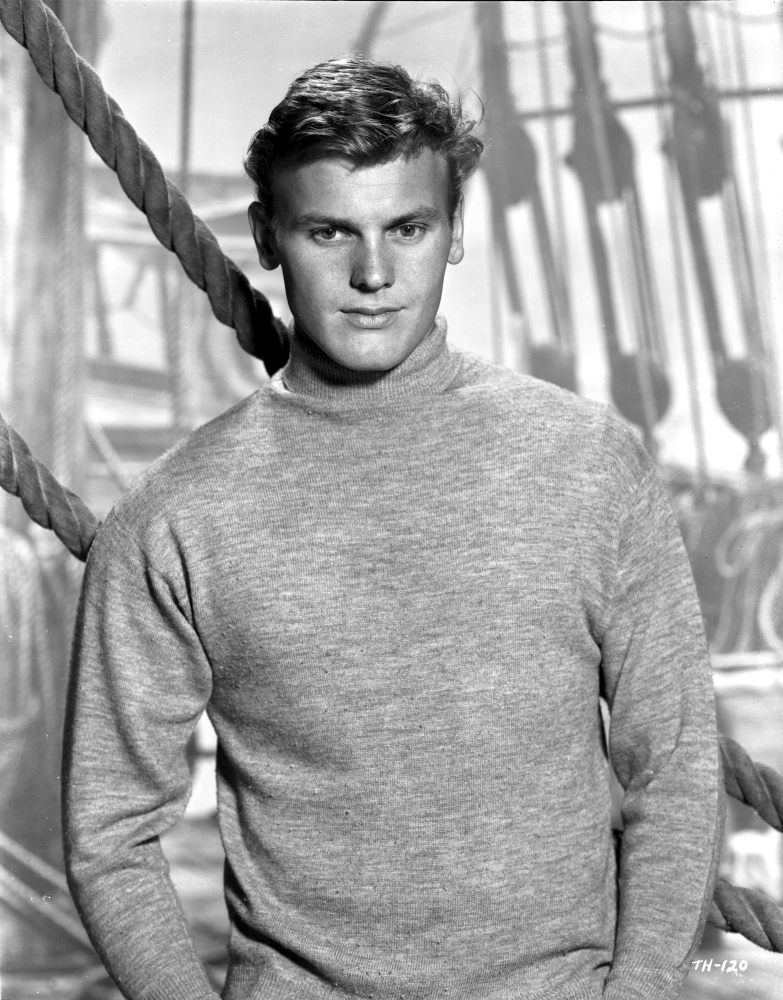
Hunter in the 1950s

Dick Clayton introduced Gelien to agent Henry Willson, who specialized in representing beefcake male stars such as Robert Wagner and Rock Hudson. It was Willson who named him "Tab Hunter".

Hunter's first film role was a minor part in a film noir, The Lawless (1950). Hunter was a friend of character actor Paul Guilfoyle, who suggested him to director Stuart Heisler; Heisler was looking for an unknown to play the lead in Island of Desire (1952) opposite Linda Darnell. The film, essentially a two-hander between Hunter and Darnell, was a hit.

Hunter supported George Montgomery in Gun Belt (1953), a Western produced by Edward Small. Small used him again for a war film, The Steel Lady (1953), supporting Rod Cameron, and as the lead in an adventure tale, Return to Treasure Island (1954). He began acting on stage, appearing in a production of Our Town. Hunter was then offered, and accepted, a contract at Warner Bros.

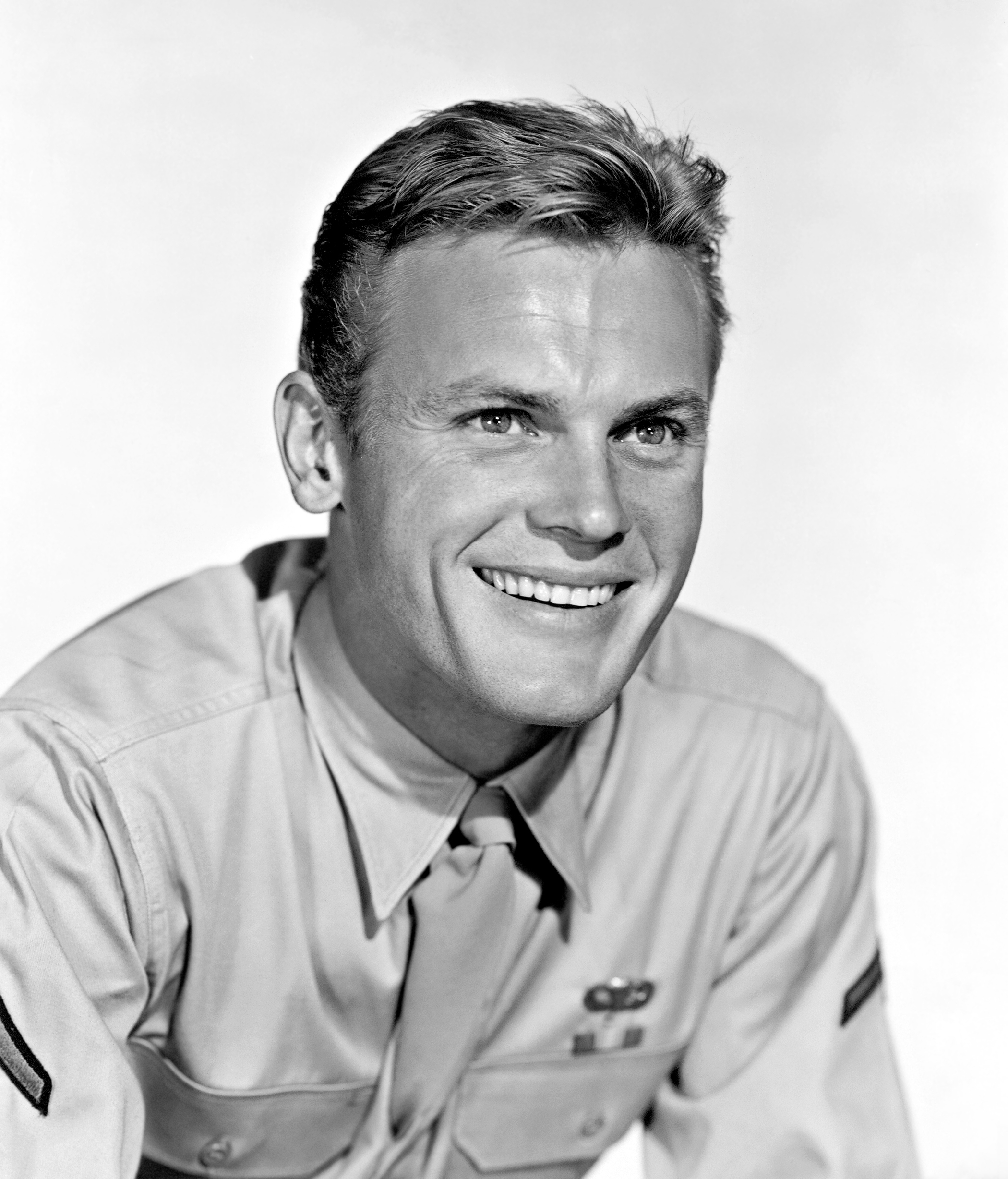
Hunter in a promotional portrait for Battle Cry (1955)

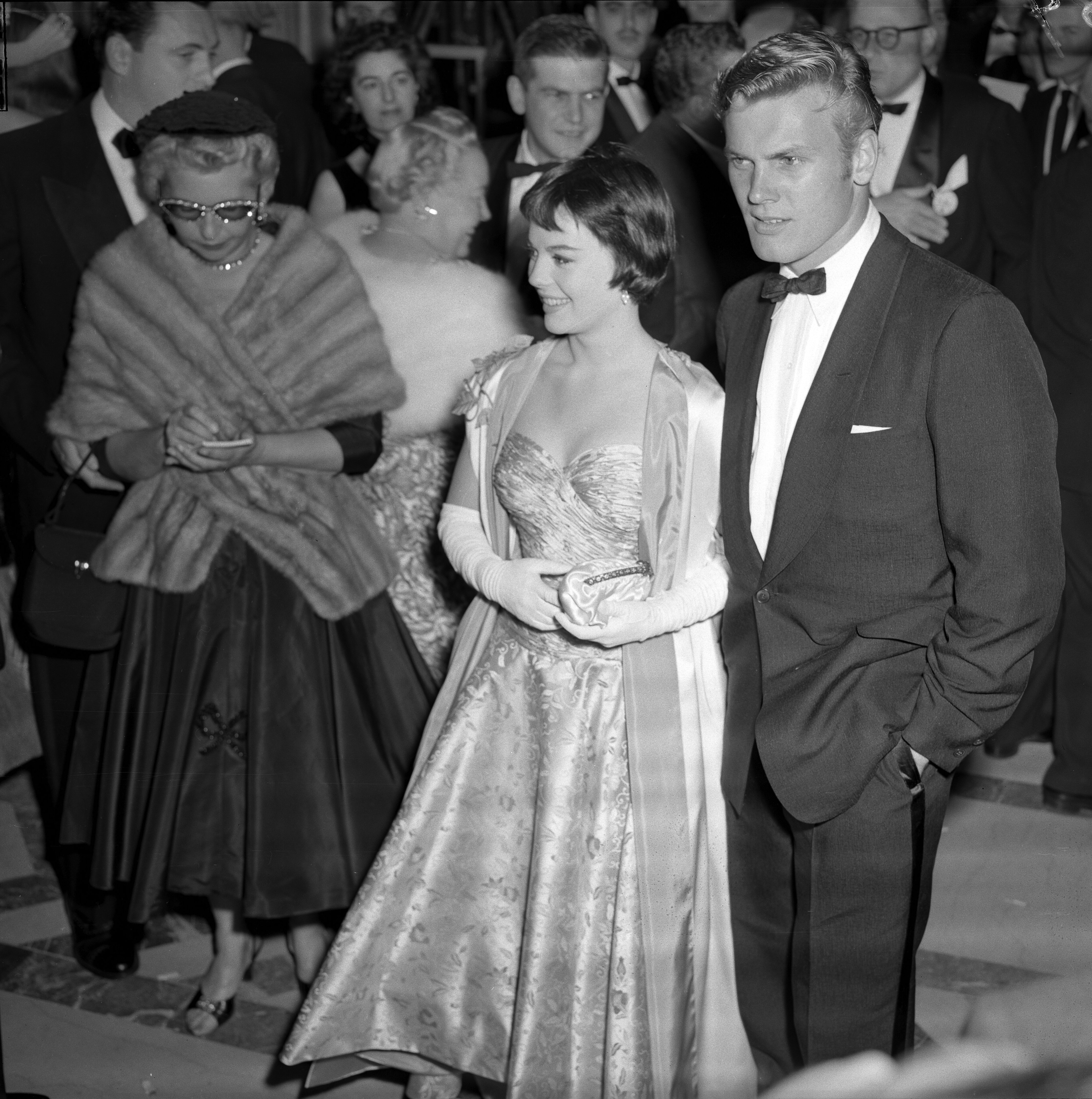
Hunter with Natalie Wood at the 28th Academy Awards in 1956

One of Hunter's first films for Warner Bros. was The Sea Chase (1955), supporting John Wayne and Lana Turner. It was a big hit, but Hunter's part was relatively small. Rushes were seen by William A. Wellman, who cast Hunter to play the younger brother of Robert Mitchum in Track of the Cat (1954). It was a solid hit and Hunter began to get more notice.

His breakthrough role came when he was cast as the young Marine Danny in 1955's World War II drama Battle Cry, which was the year's third most financially successful film. His character has an affair with an older woman, but ends up marrying the girl next door. It was based on a bestseller by Leon Uris and became Warner Bros.' largest grossing film that year, cementing Hunter's position as one of Hollywood's top young romantic leads.

In September 1955, the tabloid magazine Confidential reported that Hunter had been arrested for disorderly conduct in 1950. The innuendo-laced article, and a second one focusing on Rory Calhoun's prison record, were the result of a deal Henry Willson had brokered with the scandal rag in exchange for not revealing to the public the sexual orientation of his more prominent client, Rock Hudson. The article had no negative effect on Hunter's career. A few months later, he was named Most Promising New Personality in a nationwide poll sponsored by the Council of Motion Picture Organizations. In 1956, he received 62,000 valentines. Hunter, James Dean, and Natalie Wood were the last actors to be placed under an exclusive studio contract at Warner Bros. Warner decided to promote him to star status, teaming him with Natalie Wood in two films, a Western, The Burning Hills (1956), directed by Heisler, and The Girl He Left Behind (1956), a service comedy. These films also proved to be a hit with audiences. Warners planned a third teaming of Hunter and Wood but Hunter rejected the third picture, thus ending Warners' attempt to make Hunter and Wood the William Powell and Myrna Loy of the 1950s. Hunter was Warner Bros.' most popular male star from 1955 until 1959.

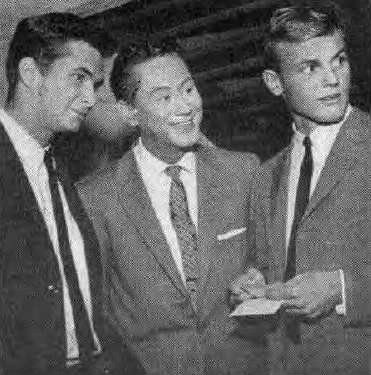
Hunter (right) with Anthony Perkins and Peter Potter on the TV show Juke Box Jury (1957)

Hunter received strong critical acclaim for a television performance he gave in the debut episode of Playhouse 90 ("Forbidden Area", 1956) written by Rod Serling and directed by John Frankenheimer.

Hunter's acting career was at its peak. William Wellman used him again in a war film, Lafayette Escadrille (1958). Columbia Pictures borrowed him for a Western, Gunman's Walk (1958), in which he played a villain against his usual roletype. Hunter claimed, "When Gunman's Walk premiered the following summer, it was one of the proudest moments of my career." Hunter starred in the musical film Damn Yankees (1958), in which he played Joe Hardy of Washington, D.C.'s American League baseball club. The film had originally been a Broadway musical, and Hunter was the only one in the film version who had not appeared in the original cast. The show was based on the best-selling 1954 book The Year the Yankees Lost the Pennant by Douglass Wallop. Hunter later said the filming was hellish because director George Abbott was interested only in recreating the stage version word for word. He also appeared in the western They Came to Cordura (1959) (with Gary Cooper and Rita Hayworth) and starred in the romantic drama That Kind of Woman (1959) (with Sophia Loren).

==== Music career ====
Hunter had a 1957 hit record with the song "Young Love", which was No. 1 on the Billboard Hot 100 chart for six weeks (seven weeks on the UK Chart), and became one of the larger hits of the Rock 'n' Roll era. It sold more than two million copies, and was awarded a gold disc by the RIAA.

Hunter had another hit single, "Ninety-Nine Ways", which peaked at No. 11 in the United States and No. 5 in the United Kingdom. His success prompted Jack L. Warner to enforce the actor's contract with the Warner Bros. studio by banning Dot Records, the label for which Hunter had recorded the single (and which was owned by rival Paramount Pictures), from releasing a follow-up album he had recorded for them. He established Warner Bros. Records specifically for Hunter.

=== Leaving Warner Bros. ===
Frustrated by his studio's controlling behavior, and their insistence that he star in a television series, Hunter made the decision to leave Warner Bros.:

If you want to be your own man, sooner or later you have to bite the hand that feeds you. I bit it on January 24, 1959, after five years at the Warner Bros. trough.

So I asked to be released from my contract. Jack Warner flatly refused. If I wanted out, he said, I'd have to buy my way out.

The asking price was $100,000.

"My God, that's a fortune," I thought. I'll never be able to pay it back. Today, it'd be the equivalent of a couple of million dollars.

But I agreed to the cost of the buyout. That's how badly I wanted off the leash.

He would later credit this decision as one of the worst in his career, as he no longer had a major studio burying bad publicity for him.

=== 1960s ===
Hunter's failure to win the role of Tony in the film adaptation of West Side Story (1961) prompted him to agree to star in a weekly television sitcom. The Tab Hunter Show had moderate ratings (due to being scheduled opposite The Ed Sullivan Show) and lasted for one season (1960–61) of 32 episodes. It was a hit in the United Kingdom, where it ranked as one of the most watched situation comedies of the year. Hunter's costars in the series included Richard Erdman, Jerome Cowan, and Reta Shaw.

Hunter had a starring role as Debbie Reynolds's love interest in the romantic comedy The Pleasure of His Company (1961). He played the lead in an Italian swashbuckler shot in Egypt, The Golden Arrow (1962). He was in a war movie for American International Pictures, Operation Bikini (1963). In 1964, he starred on Broadway opposite Tallulah Bankhead in Tennessee Williams' The Milk Train Doesn't Stop Here Anymore.

He had a starring role in Ride the Wild Surf (1964), a surf film for Columbia, followed by a movie in Britain, the crime drama Troubled Waters (1964). He stayed in England to make another picture for AIP, the science fiction film War Gods of the Deep (1965) starring Vincent Price. Back in Hollywood, he had a supporting role in the comedies The Loved One (1965) and Birds Do It (1966). He starred in a film directed by Richard Rush, The Fickle Finger of Fate (1967).

For a short time in the late 1960s, after several seasons of starring in summer stock and dinner theater in shows such as Bye Bye Birdie, The Tender Trap, Under the Yum Yum Tree, and West Side Story with some of the New York cast, Hunter settled in the south of France and acted in some Italian films including Vengeance Is My Forgiveness (1968), The Last Chance (1968), and Bridge over the Elbe (1969).

=== 1970s ===
Hunter had the lead role in the psychological horror film Sweet Kill (1973), the first movie from director Curtis Hanson. His performance earned good reviews. He won a co-starring role in the successful western film The Life and Times of Judge Roy Bean (1972), starring Paul Newman. He had small roles in Timber Tramps (1975), Won Ton Ton, the Dog Who Saved Hollywood (1976) and Katie: Portrait of a Centerfold (1978). In 1977 he played George Shumway, the father of Mary Hartman (played by Louise Lasser) on Forever Fernwood, a spinoff of the soap-like sitcom Mary Hartman, Mary Hartman.

=== 1980s ===
Hunter's career was revived in the 1980s, when he starred opposite actor Divine in John Waters' Polyester (1981) and Paul Bartel's Lust in the Dust (1985). Both of these films were hits with audiences. He played Mr. Stuart, the substitute teacher in the musical Grease 2 (1982), who sang "Reproduction". Hunter had a major role in the horror film Cameron's Closet (1989).

=== Later career ===
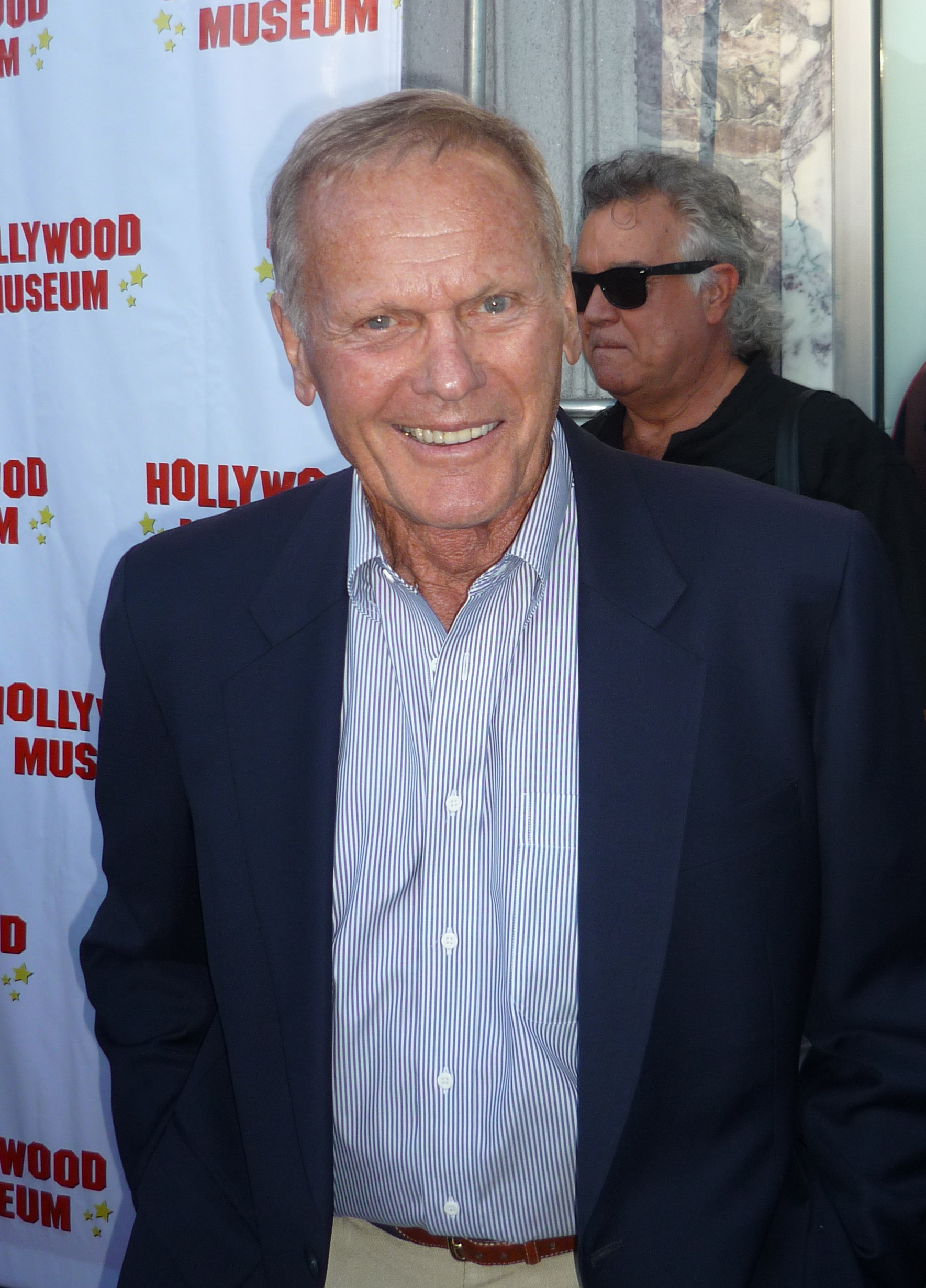
Hunter in 2008, aged 77

Hunter's last film role came in the horse-themed family film Dark Horse (1992). Hunter, a longstanding horse owner, wrote the original story and co-produced the film with his life partner, Allan Glaser.

Hunter's autobiography, Tab Hunter Confidential: The Making of a Movie Star (2005), co-written with Eddie Muller, became a New York Times bestseller, as did the paperback edition in 2007. In his memoir, Hunter officially came out as gay, confirming rumors that had circulated since the height of his fame. The book was nominated for several awards. It entered the New York Times' bestseller list for a third time on June 28, 2015, upon the release of Tab Hunter Confidential, an award-winning documentary based upon the memoir. The documentary was directed by Jeffrey Schwarz and produced by Allan Glaser. As of June 2022, a feature film about Hunter to be produced by Glaser, J. J. Abrams and Zachary Quinto was in development at Paramount Pictures. Pulitzer Prize- and Tony Award-winning writer Doug Wright is attached to create the screenplay.

Hunter has a star for his contributions to the music industry on the Hollywood Walk of Fame at 6320 Hollywood Blvd. In 2007, the Palm Springs Walk of Stars dedicated a Golden Palm Star to him.

== Personal life ==
Hunter came out publicly as gay in his 2005 memoir. According to William L. Hamilton of The New York Times, detailed reports about Hunter's alleged romances with close friends Debbie Reynolds and Natalie Wood during his young adult years had been strictly the product of studio publicity departments. As Wood and Hunter embarked on a well-publicized but fictitious romance, insiders developed their own headline for the item: "Natalie Wood and Tab Wouldn't". Regarding Hollywood's studio era, Hunter said, "[life] was difficult for me, because I was living two lives at that time. A private life of my own, which I never discussed, never talked about to anyone. And then my Hollywood life, which was just trying to learn my craft and succeed..." The star emphasized that the word "'gay' ... wasn't even around in those days, and if anyone ever confronted me with it, I'd just kinda freak out. I was in total denial. I was just not comfortable in that Hollywood scene, other than the work process." "There was a lot written about my sexuality, and the press was pretty darn cruel," the actor said, but what "moviegoers wanted to hold in their hearts were the boy-next-door marines, cowboys, and swoon-bait sweethearts I portrayed."

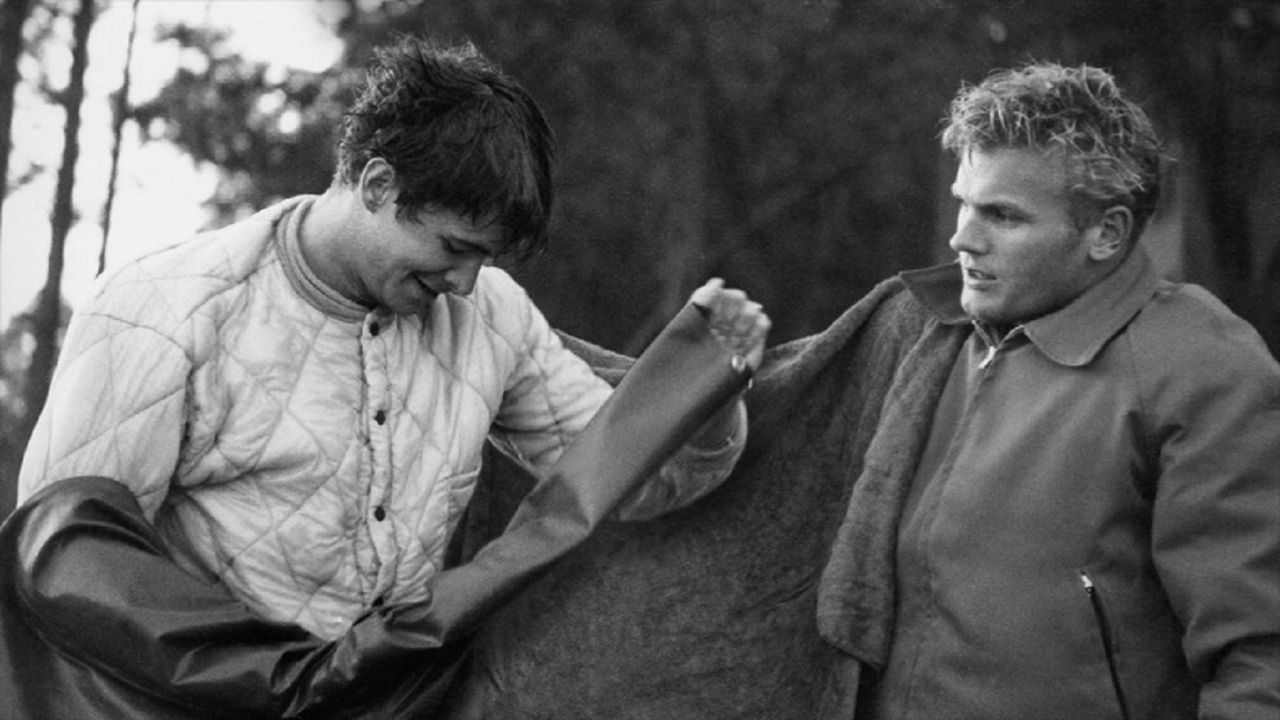
Hunter and Anthony Perkins in 1956 at Lake Arrowhead

Hunter had a relationship with actor Anthony Perkins after having met him at the Chateau Marmont during the filming of Friendly Persuasion in 1956. Their relationship spanned two to four years, and Hunter has said that they only broke up because of pressure from Perkins's movie studio, Paramount. Hunter said that on the contrary, he had experienced no similar pressure from his own studio, Warner Bros. He later remembered Perkins as a "special part of my journey. He wanted to be a movie star more than anything. I wanted that too, but not with the same kind of drive he had. We were such opposites — but then maybe that was the attraction." He also had relationships with champion figure skater Ronnie Robertson, actor Neal Noorlag, and Soviet-born ballet dancer Rudolf Nureyev before settling down and marrying his partner of more than 30 years, film producer Allan Glaser.

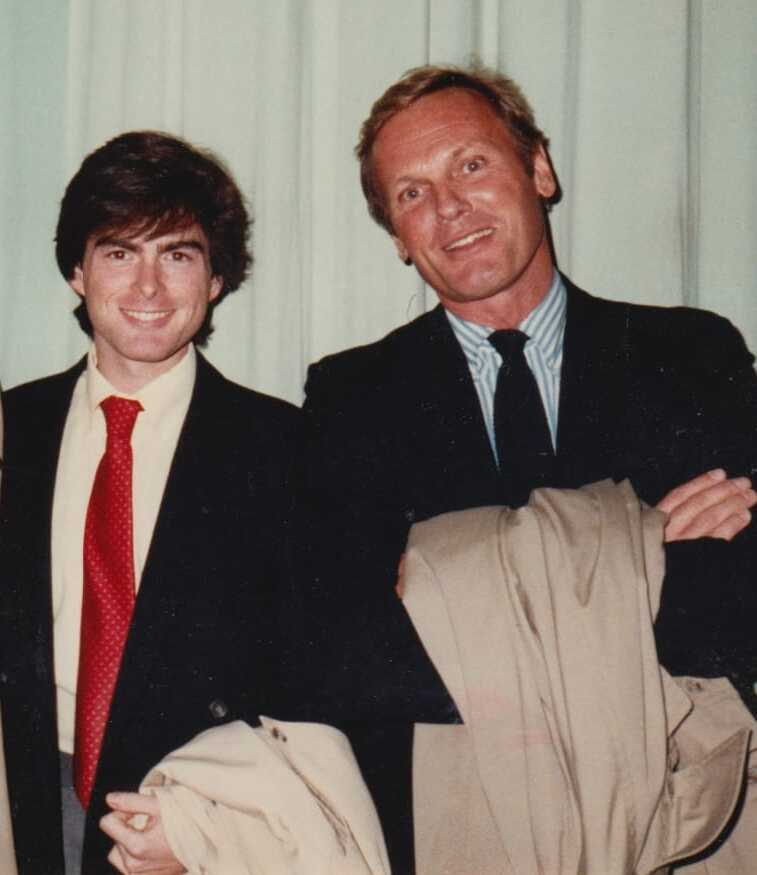
Hunter and Allan Glaser in 1985

Hunter seriously pondered marrying his Lafayette Escadrille costar Etchika Choureau as they grew closer, but decided against it as that would not be living true to himself. Additionally, Joan Perry, a close friend of his, proposed to him after her divorce from Laurence Harvey, but he refused as he wanted their relationship to remain platonic.

Hunter was raised in his mother's Catholic faith. Except for a period in his youth, Hunter was a practicing Catholic for the rest of his life. Hunter, whose father and husband were Jewish, was questioned about his own identity and responded that he did not consider himself Jewish. Hunter was an avid horse owner.

== Death ==
On July 8, 2018, three days before his 87th birthday, Hunter died from a cardiac arrest caused by complications of deep vein thrombosis. According to his husband, Allan Glaser, Hunter's death was "sudden and unexpected."

== Filmography ==
Year	Title	Role	Notes
1950	The Lawless	Frank O'Brien	also released under the title The Dividing Line
1952	Island of Desire	Marine Corporal Michael J. "Chicken" Dugan	also released under the title Saturday Island
1953	Gun Belt	Chip Ringo	
1953	The Steel Lady	Bill Larson	also released under the title Treasure of Kalifa
1954	Return to Treasure Island	Clive Stone	also narrator
1954	Track of the Cat	Harold Bridges	
1955	Battle Cry	Danny Forrester	
1955	The Sea Chase	Cadet Wesser	
1956	The Burning Hills	Trace Jordan	
1956	The Girl He Left Behind	Andy L. Shaeffer	
1958	Gunman's Walk	Ed Hackett	
1958	Lafayette Escadrille	Thad Walker	
1958	Damn Yankees	Joe Hardy	also released under the title What Lola Wants in the UK
1959	They Came to Cordura	Lt. William Fowler	
1959	That Kind of Woman	Red	directed by Sidney Lumet
1961	The Pleasure of His Company	Roger Henderson	
1962	The Golden Arrow	Hassan	
1963	Operation Bikini	Lt. Morgan Hayes	
1964	Ride the Wild Surf	Steamer Lane	
1964	Troubled Waters	Alex Carswell	
1965	City Under the Sea	Ben Harris	released as War Gods of the Deep in the U.S.
1965	The Loved One	Whispering Glades Tour Guide	
1966	Birds Do It	Lt. Porter	
1967	The Fickle Finger of Fate	Jerry	a.k.a. El Dedo del Destino and The Cup of San Sebastian
1967	Hostile Guns	Mike Reno	
1968	Vengeance Is My Forgiveness	Sheriff Durango	
1968	The Last Chance	Patrick Harris	
1969	Bridge over the Elbe	Richard	
1972	Sweet Kill (also known as A Kiss from Eddie and The Arousers)	Eddie Collins	
1972	The Life and Times of Judge Roy Bean	Sam Dodd	
1975	Timber Tramps	Big Swede	
1976	Won Ton Ton, the Dog Who Saved Hollywood	David Hamilton	
1981	Polyester	Todd Tomorrow	
1982	Pandemonium	Blue Grange	
1982	Grease 2	Mr. Stuart	
1982	And They're Off	Henry Barclay	
1985	Lust in the Dust	Abel Wood	Executive producer
1988	Out of the Dark	Driver	
1988	Grotesque	Rod	
1988	Cameron's Closet	Owen Lansing	Executive producer
1992	Dark Horse	Perkins	Executive producer and film story credit
2015	Tab Hunter Confidential	Self	Autobiographical documentary

=== Television ===
Year	Title	Role	Notes
1955	The Ford Television Theatre	Gig Spevvy	Episode: "While We're Young"
1955; 1957	Climax!	Jimmy Piersall	Episode: "Fear Strikes Out" (1955); Episode: "Mask for the Devil" (1957) – No on-screen credit
1956	Conflict	Donald McQuade	Episode: "The People Against McQuade"
1956; 1958	Playhouse 90	Donald Bashor / Stanley Smith	Episode: "Forbidden Area" (1956); Episode: "Portrait of a Murderer" (1958)
1958	Hans Brinker and the Silver Skates	Hans Brinker	TV film
1959	General Electric Theater	Daniel	Episode: "Disaster"
1960–61	The Tab Hunter Show	Paul Morgan	32 episodes; Title character and producer
1962	Saints and Sinners	Sergeant Eddie Manzak	Episode: "Three Columns of Anger"
1962	Combat!	Del Packer	Episode: "The Celebrity"
1964	Burke's Law	Barney Blake	Episode: "Who Killed Andy Zygmut?"
1970	San Francisco International Airport	Stayczek	1 episode
1970	The Virginian	Cart Banner	Episode: "The Gift"
1971	Disneyland	Tim Andrews	Episode: "Hacksaw"; Rebroadcast and syndicated as two episodes.
1972	Cannon	Bob Neal	Episode: "Treasure of St. Ignacio"
1972	Owen Marshall, Counselor at Law	Howard Reimer	Episode: "Starting Over Again"
1973	Ghost Story	Bob Herrick	Episode: "The Ghost of Potter's Field"
1975	The Six Million Dollar Man	Arnold Blake	Episode: "The Cross-Country Kidnap"
1976	Ellery Queen	John Randall	Episode: "The Adventure of the Black Falcon"
1976	Mary Hartman, Mary Hartman	George Shumway No. 2	Several un-credited cameo appearances
1976	McMillan & Wife	Roger Thornton	Episode: "Greed"
1977	The Love Boat	Dave King	Episode: "The Joker Is Mild/Take My Granddaughter, Please/First Time Out"
1977	Forever Fernwood	George Shumway	1 episode; several un-credited cameo appearances
1978	Hawaii Five-O	Mel Burgess	Episode: "Horoscope for Murder"
1978	Katie: Portrait of a Centerfold	Elliot Bender	TV film
1978	Police Woman	Martin Quinn	"Blind Terror"
1979	The Kid from Left Field	Bill Lorant	TV film
1979	$weepstake$	Chip	1 episode
1980	Charlie's Angels	Bill Maddox	Episode: "Nips and Tucks"
1981	Strike Force	Vorhees	Episode: "Night Nurse"
1982	Benson	Roy Lucas	season 4 episodes 1 & 2
1982	Fridays	Self-Guest Host	season 3 episode 13
1982	Madame's Place	Self	Episode: "Come Fly with Me"
1984	The Fall Guy	Anthony Haley	Episode: "Bite of the Wasp"
1984	Masquerade	Whitney	Episode: "Spying Down to Rio"
1989	Hollywood on Horses	Self (presenter)	Video documentary; credited as producer

== Discography ==
Year	Title	Chart positions	
Year	Title	US	UK
1957	"Young Love"/	1	1
1957	"Red Sails in the Sunset"	57	—
1957	"Ninety-Nine Ways"	11	5
1957	"Don't Get Around Much Anymore"	74	—
1958	"Jealous Heart"	62	—
1959	"(I'll Be with You) In Apple Blossom Time"	31	—
1959	"There's No Fool Like a Young Fool"	68	—
1962	"Born to Lose" / "I Can't Stop Loving You"	—	—

=== Roles turned down ===
According to Hunter, he turned down the following roles:

- the lead in Darby's Rangers
- the lead in Bombers B-52
- replacing Paul Newman on Broadway in Sweet Bird of Youth
