= Gunman's Walk =

1958 film by Phil Karlson

- 1958 theatrical poster
- Directed by: Phil Karlson
- Screenplay by: Frank S. Nugent
- Based on: story by Ric Hardman
- Produced by: Fred Kohlmar
- Starring: Van Heflin; Tab Hunter
- Cinematography: Charles Lawton Jr.
- Edited by: Jerome Thoms
- Music by: George Duning
- Color process: Technicolor
- Production company: Columbia Pictures
- Distributed by: Columbia Pictures
- Release date: July 1958
- Running time: 95 minutes
- Country: United States
- Language: English

Gunman's Walk is a 1958 American CinemaScope Western film directed by Phil Karlson and starring Van Heflin and Tab Hunter.

== Plot ==
Davy Hackett (James Darren) and his hot-tempered, arrogant older brother Ed (Tab Hunter) are about to assist their rancher father Lee (Van Heflin) on a horse roundup. The brothers meet Cecily "Clee" Chouard (Kathryn Grant), a beautiful half-French, half-Sioux woman; when Ed makes unwanted advances toward her, Davy, himself genuinely interested in her, apologizes for his brother's behavior.

Clee's brother Paul (Bert Convy) and two other Indians are invited to join the roundup. Ed particularly resents the hard-working, talented Paul. Ed is obsessed with capturing an elusive white mare, ostensibly for Davy, and cannot bear the fact that Paul decides to compete for the animal. During a wild chase after the horse, Ed rides the other man to his death off a cliff. This is witnessed by the two Indians and Ed is arrested. When the case comes to court, Ed is released when a man named Sieverts (Ray Teal) lies that he saw what happened: the cliff gave way and the death was an accident. Lee learns that Davy is in love with Clee and disowns him.

Sieverts claims he has lost a group of wild horses he had gathered; Lee allows him ten of his as a gesture of gratitude for his saving his son. When Sieverts selects the white mare Lee realizes that Sieverts is dishonest, but says nothing. Ed sees Sievert riding through town with the horses. When the man will not release the mare Ed shoots him. Jailed once again, he shoots a deputy and escapes. He is tracked down by Lee and their confrontation escalates to the point where Ed issues a challenge and prepares to draw on his father. Lee shoots and kills his son. Lee returns to town with the body and, having reflected on his own life, asks Davy and Clee to join him in taking Ed's body back to the ranch.

== Cast ==
- Van Heflin as Lee Hackett
- Tab Hunter as Ed Hackett
- Kathryn Grant as Clee Chouard
- James Darren as Davy Hackett
- Mickey Shaughnessy as Deputy Sheriff Will Motely
- Robert F. Simon as Sheriff Harry Brill
- Edward Platt as Purcell Avery
- Ray Teal as Jensen Sieverts
- Paul Birch as Bob Selkirk, Lee's caretaker
- Will Wright as Judge
- Bert Convy as Paul Chouard (uncredited)
- Chief Blue Eagle as Black Horse, Indian (uncredited)
- Paul Bryar as Saloon bartender (uncredited)
- Harry Antrim as Doctor (uncredited)
- Everett Glass as Rev. Arthur Stotheby (uncredited)
- Dorothy Adams as Martha Stotheby (uncredited)

== Production notes ==
Ric Hardman wrote the original script and it was adapted by Frank S. Nugent. Van Heflin signed to star in August 1957. Rudolph Maté was originally meant to be the director but he dropped out (he would be replaced by Phil Karlson). Tab Hunter was borrowed from Warner Bros.

Columbia contractee James Darren was assigned to a support role. Filming started in November 1957.

Director Phil Karlson says the film reduced Columbia studio head Harry Cohn to tears. "He had two sons and this was a story about a father and two sons. He identified completely."

== Reception ==
The Los Angeles Times said it was "moviemaking at its best".

== Legacy ==
Quentin Tarantino later said the film was an inspiration for Tanner, the fictitious movie starring Rick Dalton in Once Upon a Time in Hollywood.

== See also ==
- List of American films of 1958
