= Daniela Bianchi =

Italian actress (born 1942)

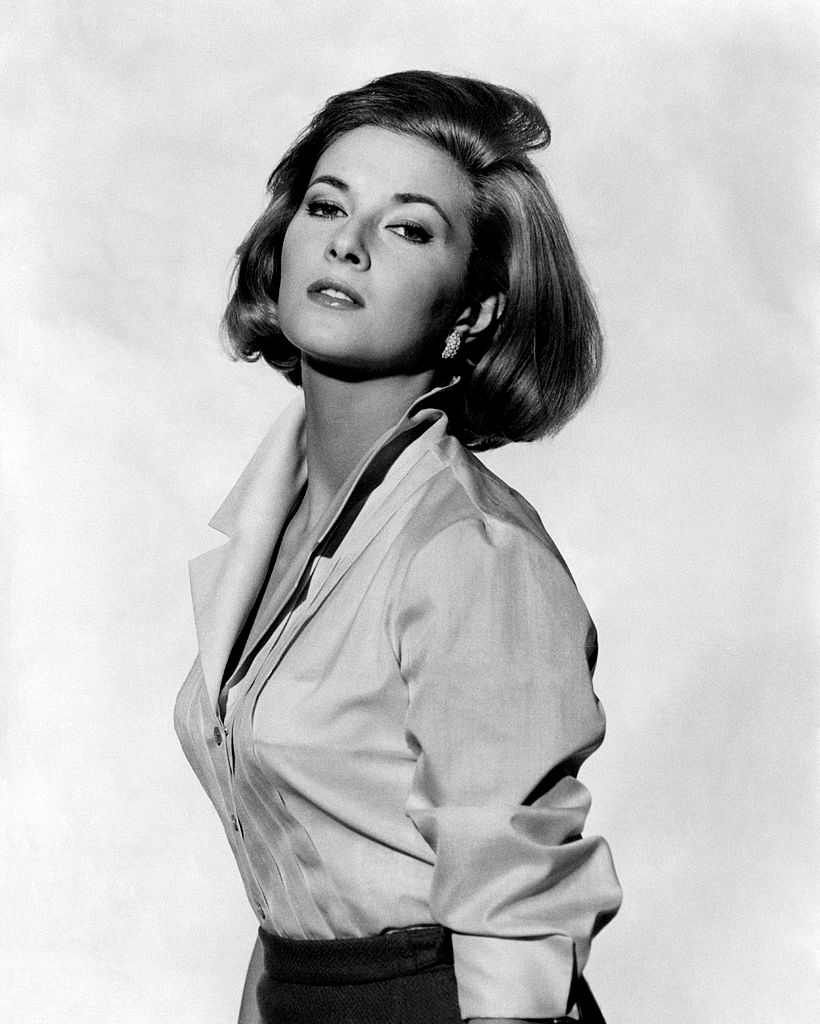
- Bianchi in 1963
- Born: 31 January 1942 (age 84); Rome, Kingdom of Italy
- Occupations: Actress, model
- Spouse: Alberto Cameli (m. 1970; died 2018)
- Children: 1
- Beauty pageant titleholder
- Title: Miss Universo Italia 1960
- Years active: 1958–1970
- Major competitions: Miss Universo Italia 1960 (Winner); Miss Universe 1960 (1st Runner-Up)

Daniela Bianchi (born 31 January 1942) is an Italian former actress, model and beauty pageant titleholder who was crowned Miss Universo Italia 1960 and represented her country at Miss Universe 1960 where she placed 1st Runner-Up. She is known for the role of Bond girl Tatiana Romanova in the 1963 film From Russia with Love.

== Early life ==
Bianchi was born in Rome to parents from Sirolo, Marche in Central Italy. Bianchi's father was an Italian Army colonel. She studied ballet for eight years, and later worked as a fashion model.

Bianchi was first runner-up at the 1960 Miss Universe pageant, where she was also voted Miss Photogenic by the press.

== Acting career ==
Bianchi began appearing in films in 1958, initially as an extra.

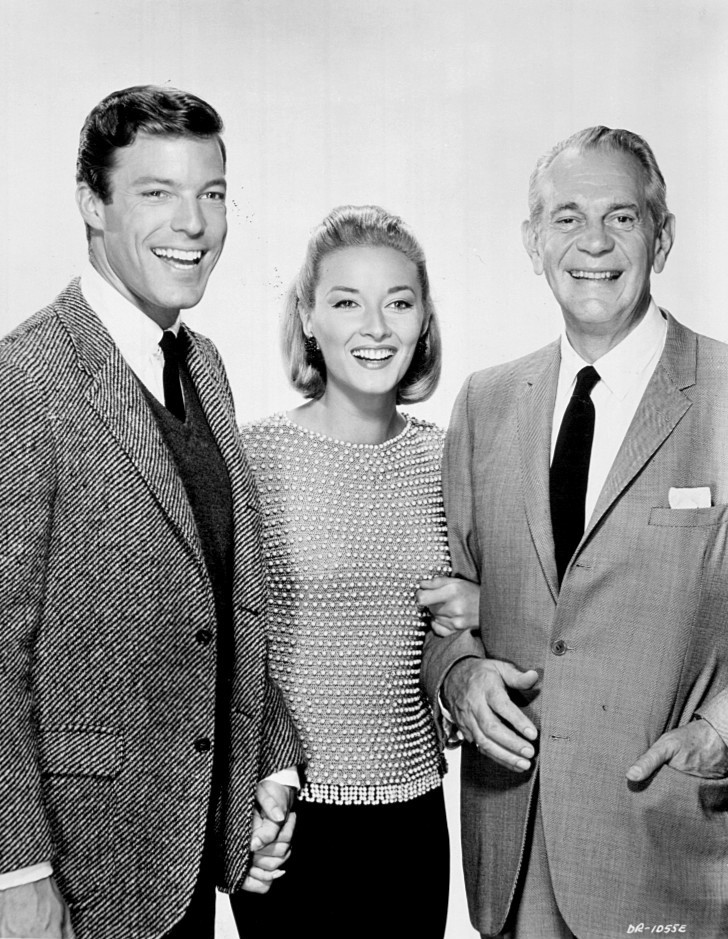
(L-R): Richard Chamberlain, Daniela Bianchi and Raymond Massey in Dr. Kildare (1964)

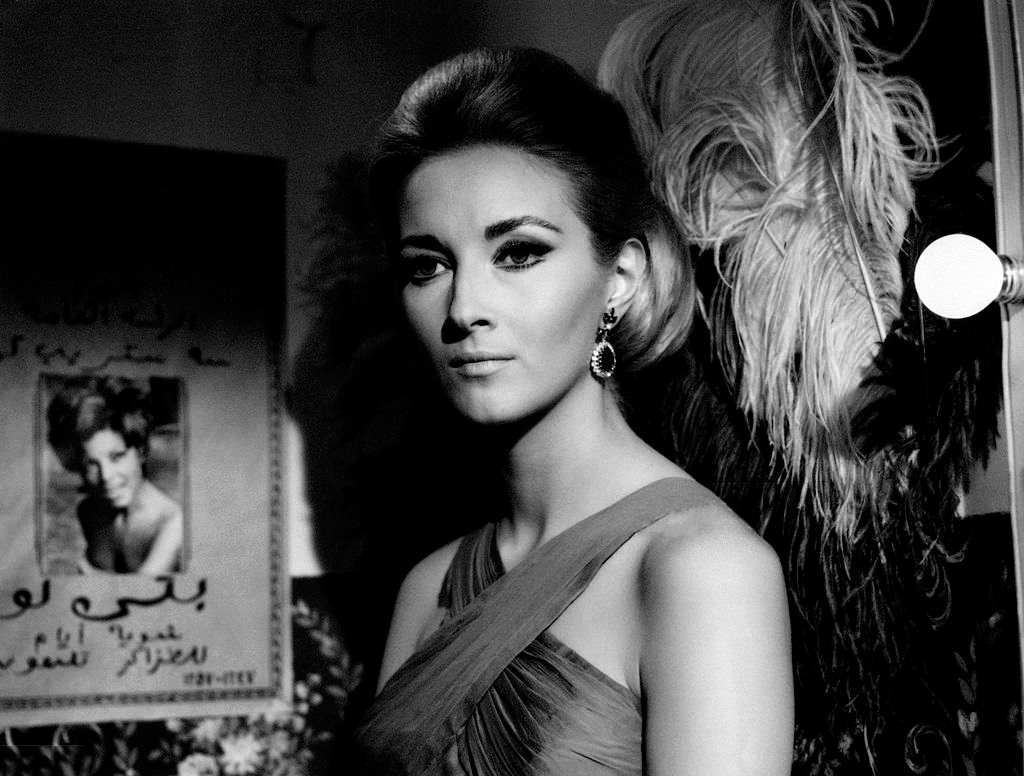
Daniela Bianchi in Requiem per un agente segreto (1966).

In 1963, she starred as Bond girl Tatiana Romanova, a Soviet cipher clerk sent to entrap agent 007, James Bond, in the 1963 film From Russia with Love. Her voice in From Russia with Love was dubbed by Barbara Jefford owing to Bianchi's heavy accent.

Bianchi starred in a number of French and Italian films after From Russia with Love, the last being The Last Chance in 1968. One of her later films was Operation Kid Brother (also known as OK Connery and Operation Double 007), which was a James Bond spoof filmed in English (though Bianchi was again dubbed) and starring Sean Connery's brother, Neil Connery. Her only role in an American production was in the Dr. Kildare three-part story "Rome Will Never Leave You."

In 1970, Bianchi retired from acting to marry a Genoan shipping magnate, Alberto Cameli, with whom she has one son. Her husband died in 2018.

In 2012, Bianchi appeared in a small role in the documentary film We're Nothing Like James Bond.

== Filmography ==
=== Film ===
Year	Title	Role	Notes
1958	In Case of Adversity	Extra	Uncredited
1961	Demons at Midnight	Extra	Uncredited
1962	Always on Sunday	Donatella	
1962	The Sword of El Cid	Elvira	
1963	From Russia with Love	Tatiana Romanova	
1964	Code Name: Tiger	Mehlica Baskine	
1965	Slalom	Nadia	
1966	Weekend, Italian Style	Isabella Dominici	
1966	Balearic Caper	Mercedes	
1966	Special Mission Lady Chaplin	Lady Arabella Chaplin	
1966	Requiem for a Secret Agent	Evelyn	
1967	Operation Kid Brother	Maya Rafis	
1967	Your Turn to Die	Arabella	
1967	Dirty Heroes	Kristina von Keist	
1968	The Last Chance	Helen Harris	final film role

=== Television ===
Year	Title	Role	Notes
1964	Dr. Kildare	Francesca Paolini	3 episodes
2012	We're Nothing Like James Bond	Herself	Documentary
