= The Steel Lady =

1953 American film by Ewald André Dupont

- Directed by: Ewald André Dupont
- Screenplay by: Richard Schayer
- Story by: Aubrey Wisberg
- Produced by: Grant Whytock
- Starring: Rod Cameron; Tab Hunter
- Cinematography: Floyd Crosby
- Edited by: Grant Whytock
- Music by: Arthur Lange; Emil Newman
- Production companies: Edward Small Productions; World Films
- Distributed by: United Artists
- Release date: October 9, 1953 (United States)
- Running time: 84 minutes
- Country: United States
- Language: English

The Steel Lady (also known as Treasure of Kalifa) is a 1953 American action film directed by Ewald André Dupont starring Rod Cameron and Tab Hunter. In the film, four Americans are stranded in the deserts of North Africa. They discover a buried German tank dating to World War II, and they attempt to cross the desert with it. But they are attacked by Bedouins, who want to retrieve stolen jewels from the tank.

== Plot ==
Four American oil company employees—boss/pilot Mike Monahan, alcoholic detection expert Syd Barlow, mechanic Jim Evans and radio man Billy Larsen—make very promising readings from the air in the Sahara Desert, but are told by company manager Sanderson that the local sheik is hostile to outsiders. While flying back, a sandstorm forces them to crash-land. They have little water, the radio transmitter is broken, and the plane's motors are clogged with sand. Monahan spots an antenna sticking out of the sand. Digging down, they discover a German Afrika Korps tank from World War II, complete with two mummified crewmen. Painted on the turret is "Eiserne jungfrau", which translates to "Steel Lady" (actually "Iron Maiden").

Larsen works all night trying to repair the transmitter with parts from the tank, and falls asleep during his turn on watch the next morning. A search plane flies overhead. Monahan wakes and lights a signal fire, but it does not see it. Larsen repairs the transmitter and contacts Sanderson, but it breaks for good before he can give their latitude.

They dig out the tank, fix the engine, and transfer gasoline from the plane. Armed with a Luger pistol, Barlow tries to strike out on his own with his share of the water, but Larsen disarms him. They need most of their water for the tank's radiator. Looking for somewhere to hide his liquor bottle, Barlow discovers a storage bay which contains jewels. He does not tell the others.

They set out for a French Foreign Legion post over a hundred miles away. En route, they are spotted by Bedouin horsemen. One of them, Mustapha El Malek, recognizes the tank. Years before, he had guided a German detachment which raided a rival tribe and stole the jewels; the tank crew then killed their comrades and drove off. Wanting the jewels, El Malek and his cousin, Sheik Taras, trade horses, a camel and supplies for the tank.

Before leaving, Barlow retrieves the jewels, but drops one. The Bedouins search the tank and find it. They demand the rest of them. Monahan does not know about Barlow's find. When El Malek insists on searching the visitors, Barlow punches him, and the Americans flee in the tank, though Larsen is wounded. When Barlow gets drunk again, Monahan finds the jewels while looking for his bottle. Furious, he orders Barlow out of the tank. Barlow fights him, but Monahan wins and drives off. Barlow runs after him. Larsen persuades him to take Barlow back.

They come across an injured "Corps d'Afrique" soldier named Zagora; he claims his detachment was wiped out by Tuaregs. He guides them to a well 10 km (6.2 mi). However, he is a turncoat working for El Malek and leading them into an ambush. When the three healthy Americans leave to get water, Zagora finds the jewels, but Larsen fights him and fires the machine gun. Monahan and the others hear the gunfire and return. The Bedouins open fire, but the Americans drive off. One Bedouin jumps aboard and fires into the engine before being killed; the radiator is punctured and water leaks out, eventually disabling the tank. The Americans are trapped inside, surrounded by the enemy. Monahan tells the others he had planned to return the jewels to their rightful owner, the hostile sheik, in exchange for oil rights.

That night, Monahan takes Barlow to steal water for Larsen, while Larsen converts the tank's receiver into a transmitter. They succeed, but Barlow is shot in the leg. Monahan transmits a mayday, and a company plane lands nearby. While Larsen and Evans get aboard, Monahan holds the enemy off with the machine gun. Then he tries to pull Barlow out of the tank. However, Barlow pushes Monahan away and locks himself in. He then provides covering fire for Monahan's escape. After the plane takes off, Barlow runs out of bullets, and the Bedouins rush onto the tank.

== Cast ==
- Rod Cameron as Mike Monahan
- Tab Hunter as Billy Larsen
- John Dehner as Syd Barlow
- Richard Erdman as Jim Evans
- John Abbott as Mustapha El Melek
- Frank Puglia as Sheik Taras
- Anthony Caruso as Zagora
- Christopher Dark as Ibrahim
- Dick Rich as Sanderson
- Charles Victor as Sanderson's radio man
- Carmen D'Antonio as dancing girl
- Suzanne Ridgway as Bedouin servant girl

== Production ==
Tab Hunter made the film under a two picture deal with producer Edward Small. (The other film was Gun Belt.) Filming started in December 1952. The German tank is a US M24 Chaffee, somewhat disguised to appear like a Panzer IV.

== Release ==
The film was released on a double bill with Captain John Smith and Pocahontas.

Variety said "plot idea has some novelty to help the action and the picture will drive its purpose as a dualer."

== See also ==
- Assault on a Queen (1966)
