= Balearic Caper =

- Directed by: José María Forqué
- Written by: Jacques Sernas; Jaime de Armiñán; José María Forqué; Giovanni Simonelli; Duccio Tessari
- Produced by: José Gutiérrez Maesso
- Starring: Jacques Sernas; Daniela Bianchi
- Cinematography: Cecilio Paniagua
- Edited by: Franco Fraticelli
- Music by: Benedetto Ghiglia
- Release date: 1966
- Language: Italian

Balearic Caper (Spanish: Zarabanda bing bing, Italian: Baleari Operazione Oro, French: Barbouze chérie, also known as Operation Gold) is a 1966 Spanish-Italian-French heist-Eurospy comedy film written and directed by José María Forqué and starring Jacques Sernas, Daniela Bianchi and Mireille Darc. It was shot in Ibiza.

== Synopsis ==
On a Balearic Island, divers grab a valuable scepter but end up mysteriously murdered. Secret service commandos are sent to the island. The mayor decides to showcase the artwork in the museum to lure in customers. They watch each other, tail one another, and exchange coded messages...

== Cast ==
- Jacques Sernas as Pierre
- Daniela Bianchi as Mercedes
- Mireille Darc as Polly
- Harold Sakata as Museum Director
- Marilù Tolo as Sofia
- José Luis López Vázquez as Fernando
- Venantino Venantini as Giuliano
- Adriano Rimoldi
