= The Last Chance (1968 film) =

1968 spy film by Giuseppe Rosati

- Directed by: Giuseppe Rosati
- Written by: Giuseppe Rosati
- Starring: Tab Hunter; Daniela Bianchi
- Cinematography: Gábor Pogány
- Music by: Carlo Rustichelli
- Release date: 1968
- Language: English

The Last Chance (Italian: Scacco internazionale) is a 1968 Italian spy film written and directed by Giuseppe Rosati and starring Tab Hunter. It was the last film of Daniela Bianchi, who married shortly after and abandoned show business to devote herself to her family. It is also the only spy film of Carlo Delle Piane, but his scenes were removed from the final cut.

== Plot ==
When a mysterious Albanian freighter is blown up in the territorial waters off the coast of Rome, the authorities try to cover it up by claiming there was only one survivor. However, an astute American journalist living in Rome, Patrick Harris (Tab Hunter), discovers there were actually two survivors and publishes the truth in his newspaper. This revelation immediately puts a target on his back, and Patrick finds himself the victim of multiple assassination attempts. Unwittingly dragged into a deadly Cold War conspiracy involving a Russian gun-running ring, Soviet double agents, and the CIA, Patrick must navigate a maze of deception. Assisted by US diplomat George McConnell (Michael Rennie) and dealing with the jealousy of his beautiful wife Helen (Daniela Bianchi), Patrick must uncover the encrypted list of Soviet agents hiding in Europe before the ruthless assassins silence him forever.

== Cast ==
- Tab Hunter as Patrick Harris
- Daniela Bianchi as Helen Harris
- Michael Rennie as George McConnell
- Luisa Baratto as Stephanie McConnell
- Umberto Raho as Carlo
- Luciano Rossi as Besive
- Bill Vanders as Clark
- Franco Ressel as Inspector
- Mario Maranzana
