= Frank Puglia =

Italian actor (1892–1975)

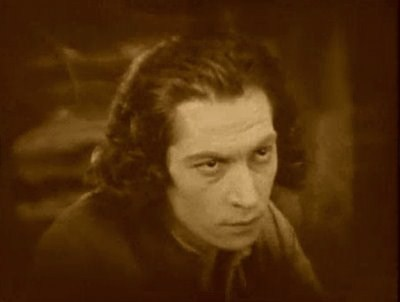
- Frank Puglia in Orphans of the Storm (1921)
- Born: Francesco Giuseppe Puglia; 9 March 1892; Linguaglossa, Sicily, Kingdom of Italy
- Died: 25 October 1975 (aged 83); South Pasadena, California, U.S.
- Occupation: Actor
- Years active: 1921–1975
- Spouse(s): Irene Veneroni (m. 19??; died 1973)

Francesco Giuseppe "Frank" Puglia (9 March 1892 – 25 October 1975) was an Italian actor. He had small, but memorable roles in films including Casablanca (a Moroccan rug merchant), Now, Voyager and The Jungle Book.

== Biography ==
Born in Linguaglossa, Catania, Sicily, the actor started his career as a teen on stage in Italian operas. He emigrated to the U.S. in 1907. He left from Naples on the ship Italia.

In New York City he worked in a laundry before joining an Italian language theater group. While appearing on stage, he was discovered by D. W. Griffith, with whom he worked in over 150 films. He usually played ethnic types in films, and claimed to have learned English from reading newspapers.

He was originally cast as the undertaker, Bonasera, in Francis Ford Coppola's movie The Godfather (1972), even participating in Marlon Brando's screen test, but he fell ill before filming could begin. He was replaced by Sicilian actor Salvatore Corsitto.

He died on October 25, 1975, in South Pasadena, California, and he is buried in the Hollywood Forever Cemetery in Hollywood, California.

On August 10, 2016, he was celebrated in his hometown, Linguaglossa.

== Filmography ==
- Orphans of the Storm (1921) as Pierre Frochard
- Fascination (1922) as Nema
- Isn't Life Wonderful (1924) as Theodor
- Romola (1924) as Adolfo Spini
- The Beautiful City (1925) as Carlo Gillardi
- The Man Who Laughs (1928) as Clown (uncredited)
- The White Sister (1933) as Celebrating Soldier (uncredited)
- Dinner at Eight (1933) as Butler (uncredited)
- The Solitaire Man (1933) as Waiter (uncredited)
- Men in White (1934) as Dr. Vitale
- Viva Villa! (1934) as Pancho Villa's Father
- Stamboul Quest (1934) as German Aide (uncredited)
- One More River (1934) as Waiter (uncredited)
- Chained (1934) as Cafe Headwaiter (uncredited)
- Bordertown (1935) as Police Commissioner in Mexico (uncredited)
- Red Hot Tires (1935) as Brazilian Radio Announcer (uncredited)
- One New York Night (1935) as Louis the Waiter (uncredited)
- The Melody Lingers On (1935) as Giuseppe
- The Perfect Gentleman (1935) as Waiter (uncredited)
- Okay, José (1935 short) as Comandante Capitán Lopez (uncredited)
- Captain Blood (1935) as French Officer (uncredited)
- Wife vs. Secretary (1935) as Havana Hotel Clerk (uncredited)
- Fatal Lady (1936) as Felipe (uncredited)
- His Brother's Wife (1936) as Jungle Hotel Clerk (uncredited)
- Bulldog Edition (1936) as Henchman Tony (uncredited)
- The Devil Is a Sissy (1936) as 'Grandma'
- The Gay Desperado (1936) as López
- The Public Pays (1936 short) as Moran's Hood (uncredited)
- The Garden of Allah (1936) as Man (uncredited)
- Love on the Run (1936) as Waiter (uncredited)
- Mama Steps Out (1937) as Robert Dalderder - the Priest
- When You're in Love (1937) as Carlos
- A Doctor's Diary (1937) as Louie
- Seventh Heaven (1937) as Postman (uncredited)
- Maytime (1937) as Orchestra Conductor (uncredited)
- We Have Our Moments (1937) as Customs Inspector (uncredited)
- Thin Ice (1937) as First Porter (uncredited)
- Song of the City (1937) as Tony
- King of Gamblers (1937) as Mike (uncredited)
- Exclusive (1937) as Johnny (uncredited)
- You Can't Have Everything (1937) as Waiter at Romano's (uncredited)
- She's No Lady (1937) as Bartender (uncredited)
- The Firefly (1937) as Pablo (uncredited)
- The Bride Wore Red (1937) as Alberto
- Lancer Spy (1937) as Monk (uncredited)
- Beg, Borrow or Steal (1937) as French Detective Looking for Summitt (uncredited)
- Mannequin (1937) as Striking Seaman (uncredited)
- Bulldog Drummond's Revenge (1937) as Draven Nogais
- Change of Heart (1938) as Lucio (uncredited)
- Invisible Enemy (1938) as Signor Bramucci
- A Trip to Paris (1938) as Waiter (uncredited)
- Yellow Jack (1938) as Stagamonte (uncredited)
- Rascals (1938) as Florist
- Joaquin Murrieta (1938 short) as Bronco (uncredited)
- Tropic Holiday (1938) as Co-Pilot (uncredited)
- I'll Give a Million (1938) as Citizen #2
- Barefoot Boy (1938) as Hank
- Spawn of the North (1938) as Red's Gang Member #2 (uncredited)
- The Sisters (1938) as Wireless Operator (uncredited)
- The Shining Hour (1938) as Maurice - the Headwaiter (uncredited)
- Sharpshooters (1938) as Ivan
- Dramatic School (1938) as Alphonse
- Zaza (1939) as Rug Dealer
- Pirates of the Skies (1939) as Jerry Petri
- Mystery of the White Room (1939) as Tony
- Society Lawyer (1939) as Headwaiter (uncredited)
- Forged Passport (1939) as Chief Miguel
- Code of the Secret Service (1939) as Train Conductor (uncredited)
- The Girl and the Gambler (1939) as Gomez
- In Old Caliente (1939) as Don José Vargas
- Maisie (1939) as Ernie
- The Spellbinder (1939) as Headwaiter (uncredited)
- Conspiracy (1939) as Police Capt. Luther (uncredited)
- In Name Only (1939) as Manager - Tony's Cafe (uncredited)
- Lady of the Tropics (1939) as Telegraph Office Clerk (uncredited)
- The Monroe Doctrine (1939 short) as King Ferdinand VII
- Mr. Smith Goes to Washington (1939) as Handwriting Expert (uncredited)
- Charlie Chan in City in Darkness (1939) as Gendarme at Steamship Office (uncredited)
- Balalaika (1939) as Ivan (uncredited)
- The Fatal Hour (1940) as Harry 'Hardway' Lockett
- I Take This Woman (1940) as Milt (scenes deleted)
- Castle on the Hudson (1940) as Tony (uncredited)
- Charlie Chan in Panama (1940) as Achmed Halide
- 'Til We Meet Again (1940) as Mexican Bartender (uncredited)
- Torrid Zone (1940) as Rodriguez
- Love, Honor and Oh-Baby! (1940) as Headwaiter
- Argentine Nights (1940) as Police Chief (uncredited)
- Rangers of Fortune (1940) as Stefan (uncredited)
- Down Argentine Way (1940) as Montero
- Arise, My Love (1940) as Father Jacinto
- The Flag of Humanity (1940 short) as Henry Dunant (uncredited)
- Meet the Wildcat (1940) as Chief of Police
- The Mark of Zorro (1940) as Proprietor
- No, No, Nanette (1940) as Art Critic (uncredited)
- Behind the News (1940) as Tomas Almedo (uncredited)
- Tengo fe en ti (1940) as Enrico Buriani
- That Night in Rio (1941) as Pedro
- Billy the Kid (1941) as Pedro Gonzales
- The Parson of Panamint (1941) as Joaquin Fuentes
- World Premiere (1941) as Dapper Officer (uncredited)
- Law of the Tropics (1941) as Tito
- Always in My Heart (1942) as Joe Borelli
- Secret Agent of Japan (1942) as Eminescu
- Jungle Book (1942) as The Pundit
- Who Is Hope Schuyler? (1942) as Baggott
- Escape from Hong Kong (1942) as Kosura
- Flight Lieutenant (1942) as Father Carlos (uncredited)
- The Boogie Man Will Get You (1942) as Silvio Baciagalupi (uncredited)
- Now, Voyager (1942) as Giuseppe (uncredited)
- Casablanca (1942) as Moroccan Rug Merchant (uncredited)
- Journey into Fear (1942) as Colonel Haki's Office Aide (uncredited)
- Mission to Moscow (1943) as Trial Judge Ulrich (uncredited)
- Action in the North Atlantic (1943) as Captain Carpolis (uncredited)
- Pilot No. 5 (1943) as Nikola
- Background to Danger (1943) as Syrian Vendor (uncredited)
- For Whom the Bell Tolls (1943) as Captain Gomez
- Phantom of the Opera (1943) as Villeneuve
- Princess O'Rourke (1943) as Greek Cafe Proprietor (uncredited)
- Around the World (1943) as Native Dealer (uncredited)
- Tarzan's Desert Mystery (1943) as Magistrate
- Ali Baba and the Forty Thieves (1944) as Prince Cassim
- Passage to Marseille (1944) as Older Guard (uncredited)
- This Is the Life (1944) as Music Teacher
- Dragon Seed (1944) as Wu Lien's Old Clerk (uncredited)
- Tall in the Saddle (1944) as Tala (uncredited)
- Brazil (1944) as Señor Machado
- Together Again (1944) as Leonardo (uncredited)
- A Song to Remember (1945) as Monsieur Jollet (uncredited)
- Roughly Speaking (1945) as Tony (uncredited)
- Blood on the Sun (1945) as Prince Tatsugi
- Week-End at the Waldorf (1945) as Emile
- Without Reservations (1946) as Ortega
- Easy Come, Easy Go (1947) as Italian Grocer (uncredited)
- My Favorite Brunette (1947) as Baron Montay
- Stallion Road (1947) as Pelon
- Fiesta (1947) as Doctor
- Brute Force (1947) as Ferrara
- Escape Me Never (1947) as The Guide
- The Lost Moment (1947) as Pietro
- Road to Rio (1947) as Rodrigues
- Dream Girl (1948) as Antonio
- Joan of Arc (1948) as Nicolas de Houppeville, a Judge
- Bride of Vengeance (1949) as Bolfi
- Colorado Territory (1949) as Brother Tomas
- Special Agent (1949) as Grandfather Devereaux
- Bagdad (1949) as Saleel
- Captain Carey, U.S.A. (1950) as Luigi
- Black Hand (1950) as Carlo Sabballera
- Federal Agent at Large (1950) as Angelo 'Angel' Badillo
- The Desert Hawk (1950) as Ahmed Bey
- Walk Softly, Stranger (1950) as A.J. Corelli
- Double Crossbones (1951) as Debtor (uncredited)
- The Bandits of Corsica (1953) as Riggio
- Son of Belle Starr (1953) as Manuel
- The Caddy (1953) as Mr. Spezzato
- The Steel Lady (1953) as Sheik Taras
- Jubilee Trail (1954) as Don Orosco (uncredited)
- Casanova's Big Night (1954) as Carabaccio
- The Shanghai Story (1954) as Mr. Chen
- A Star Is Born (1954) as Bruno (uncredited)
- Serenade (1956) as Manuel Montes
- The First Texan (1956) as Pepe
- The Burning Hills (1956) as Tio Perico
- Accused of Murder (1956) as Cesar Cipriano
- Duel at Apache Wells (1957) as Señor Valdez
- 20 Million Miles to Earth (1957) as Dr. Leonardo
- The Black Orchid (1959) as Henry Gallo
- Cry Tough (1959) as Lavandero
- Girls! Girls! Girls! (1962) as Papa Stavros
- The Sword of Ali Baba (1965) as Cassim
- Operation Razzle-Dazzle (1966, TV Movie)
- The Spy in the Green Hat (1967) as Padre
- A Bell for Adano (1967, TV Movie) as Afronti
- Say Goodbye, Maggie Cole (1972, TV Movie) as Mr. Alissandro
- Mr. Ricco (1975) as Uncle Enzo
