= Barbara Korte =

German professor of English literature and cultural studies

Barbara Korte (born 1957) is a German professor of English literature and cultural studies.

== Career ==
Barbara Korte was born in 1957 in Cologne.

Korte earned her PhD in 1985 and her habilitation (highest university degree in Germany) in 1992, both at the University of Cologne. After that, she became professor for English literature at the Chemnitz University of Technology and later at the University of Tübingen. Since October 2002, she works as a professor for English literature and cultural studies at the University of Freiburg.

She is a member of the Heidelberg Academy of Sciences and Humanities.

== Research interests ==
Korte's habilitation in the field of narratology was on Body Language in Literature (publication 1993 (in German) and 1997 (in English). After that, she researched on topics regarding the British short story. Then she continued to turn towards the fields of cultural studies and media studies, she worked in many research groups concerned with these topics. These include research on the cultural production and reception in World War One Britain, history in popular culture, heroes and heroism, and English travel literature and its transformation towards new medial forms.

== Selected publications ==
=== Monograps ===
- Body Language in Literature. (= Theory/Culture). University of Toronto Press, Toronto / Buffalo / London 1997, ISBN 0-8020-0706-6.
- English Travel Writing: From Pilgrimages to Postcolonial Explorations. Macmillan, Basingstoke 2000, ISBN 0-333-77041-2.
- with Claudia Sternberg: Bidding for the Mainstream? Black and Asian Film in Britain since the 1990s. Rodopi, Amsterdam / New York 2004, ISBN 90-420-1038-X.
- Represented Reporters: Images of War Correspondents in Memoirs and Fiction. transcript, Bielefeld 2009, ISBN 978-3-8376-1062-8.
- with Eva Ulrike Pirker: Black History White History: Britain's Historical Programme between Windrush and Wilberforce. transcript, Bielefeld 2011, ISBN 978-3-8376-1935-5.
- with Georg Zipp: Poverty in Contemporary Literature: Themes and Figurations on the British Book Market. Palgrave Macmillan, Basingstoke 2014, ISBN 978-1-137-42928-5.

=== Editor ===
- with Hartmut Berghoff and others.: The Making of Modern Tourism: The Cultural History of the British Experience, 1600–2000. Palgrave, Basingstoke 2002, ISBN 0-333-97114-0.
- with Ann-Marie Einhaus: The Penguin Book of First World War Stories. (= Penguin Classics). Penguin, Harmondsworth 2007, ISBN 978-0-14-144215-0.
- with Sandra Schaur and Stefan Welz: Britische Literatur in der DDR. (British Literature in the GDR)(= ZAA Monographs). Königshausen & Neumann, Würzburg 2008, ISBN 978-3-8260-3920-1.
- with Sylvia Paletschek: Popular History Now and Then: International Perspectives. transcript, Bielfeld 2012, ISBN 978-3-8376-2007-8.
- with Frédéric Regard: Narrating Poverty and Precarity in Britain. (= Culture & Conflict. Bd. 5). de Gruyter, Berlin 2014, ISBN 978-3-11-036574-0.
- with Stefanie Lethbridge: Heroes and Heroism in British Fiction since 1800: Case Studies. Palgrave Macmillan, Basingstoke 2017. doi:10.1007/978-3-319-33557-5
- with Stefanie Lethbridge: Victorian Periodicals Review. Special Issue: Borders and Border Crossings in the Victorian Periodical Press, 51.3 (Fall 2018). ISSN 1712-526X.
- with Simon Wendt and Nicole Falkenhayner: Heroism as a Global Phenomenon in Contemporary Culture. London / New York 2019, ISBN 978-0-367-20665-9.
- with Laura Lojo Rodriguez: Borders and Border Crossings in the Contemporary British Short Story. Springer Nature [Palgrave Macmillan], Cham 2019, ISBN 978-3-030-30358-7.
