= From Russia, with Love (novel) =

1957 spy fiction novel by Ian Fleming

- First edition cover
- Author: Ian Fleming
- Cover artist: Richard Chopping; Devised by Ian Fleming
- Series: James Bond
- Genre: Spy fiction
- Publisher: Jonathan Cape
- Publication date: 8 April 1957 (hardback)
- Publication place: United Kingdom
- Pages: 253 (first edition)
- Preceded by: Diamonds Are Forever
- Followed by: Dr. No

From Russia, with Love is the fifth novel by the English author Ian Fleming to feature his fictional British Secret Service agent James Bond. Fleming wrote the story in early 1956 at his Goldeneye estate in Jamaica; at the time he thought it might be his final Bond book. The novel was first published in the United Kingdom by Jonathan Cape on 8 April 1957.

The story centres on a plot by SMERSH, the Soviet counter-intelligence agency, to assassinate Bond in such a way as to discredit both him and his organisation. As bait, the Russians use a beautiful cipher clerk Tatiana Romanova and the Spektor, a Soviet decoding machine. Much of the action takes place in Istanbul and on the Orient Express. The book was inspired by Fleming's visit to Turkey on behalf of The Sunday Times to report on an Interpol conference; he returned to Britain by the Orient Express. From Russia, with Love deals with the East–West tensions of the Cold War, and the decline of British power and influence in the post-Second World War era.

From Russia, with Love received broadly positive reviews at the time of publication. The book's sales were boosted by an advertising campaign that played upon a visit by the British Prime Minister Anthony Eden to the Goldeneye estate, and the publication of an article in Life, which listed From Russia, with Love as one of US President John F. Kennedy's ten favourite books. The story was serialised in the Daily Express newspaper, first in an abridged, multi-part form and then as a comic strip. In 1963 it was adapted into the second film in the Bond series, starring Sean Connery.

== Plot ==
Not that it matters, but a great deal of the background to this story is accurate. ... SMERSH, a contraction of Smiert Spionam—Death to Spies—exists and remains today the most secret department of the Soviet government.

— Ian Fleming, From Russia, with Love, Author's note

SMERSH, the Soviet counterintelligence agency, plans to commit a grand act of terrorism in the intelligence field. For this, it targets the British secret service agent James Bond. Due in part to his role in the defeat of the SMERSH agents Le Chiffre, Mr Big and Hugo Drax, Bond has been listed as an enemy of the Soviet state and a "death warrant" is issued for him. His death is planned to precipitate a major sex scandal, which will run in the world press for months and leave his and his service's reputations in tatters. Bond's killer is to be the SMERSH executioner Donovan "Red" Grant, a British Army deserter and psychopath whose homicidal urges coincide with the full moon. Kronsteen, SMERSH's chess-playing master planner, and Colonel Rosa Klebb, the head of Operations and Executions, devise the operation. They instruct an attractive young cipher clerk, Corporal Tatiana Romanova, to tell the British that she wants to defect from her post in Istanbul and claim to have fallen in love with Bond after seeing a photograph of him. As an added lure, Romanova will provide the British with a Spektor, a Soviet decoding device much coveted by MI6. She is not told the details or purpose of the plan.

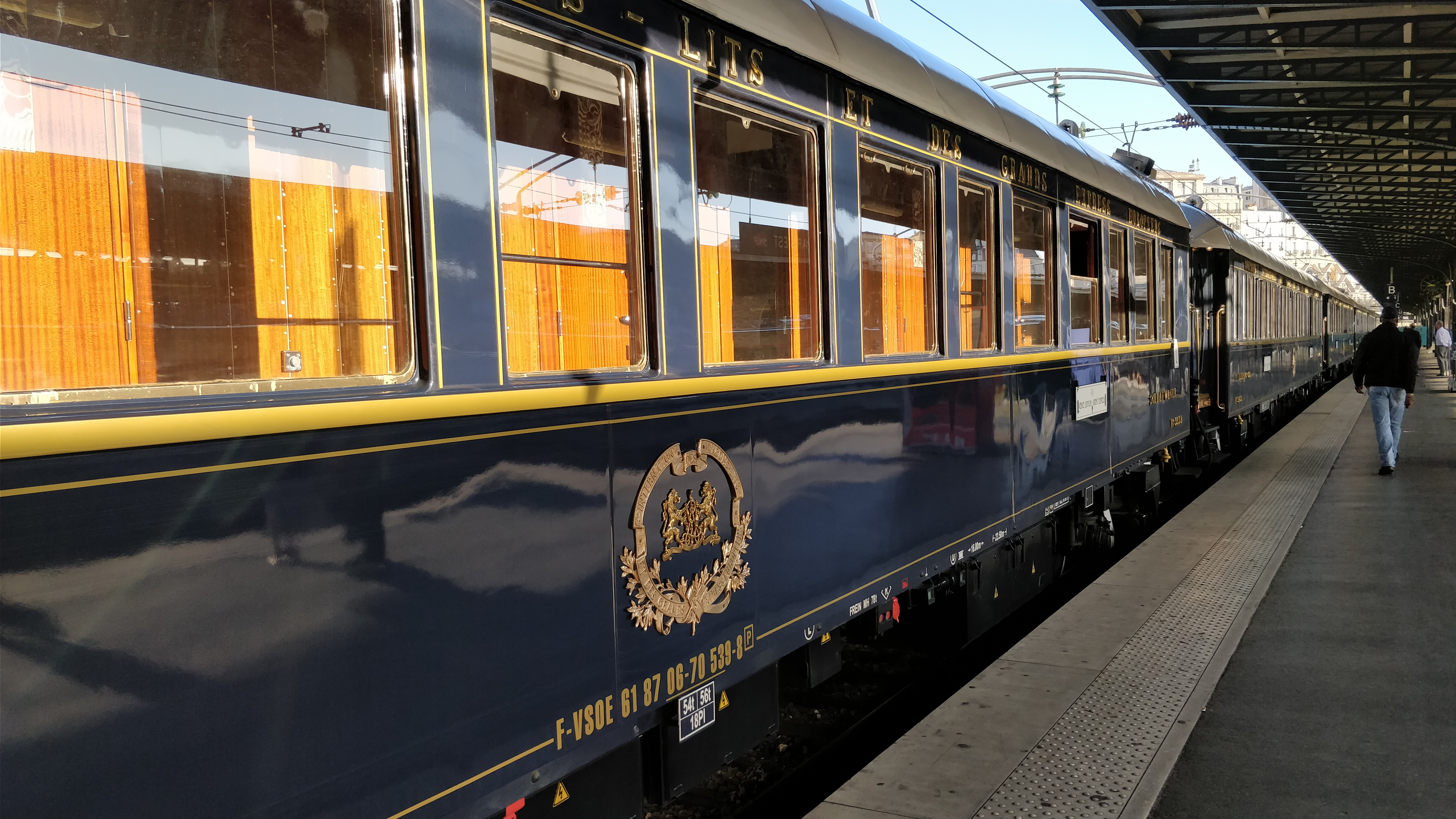
The Orient Express, on which Bond travelled from Istanbul to Paris

The offer of defection, ostensibly from Romanova, is received by MI6 in London, but is conditional on Bond collecting her and the Spektor from Istanbul. MI6 is unsure of Romanova's motives, but the prize of the Spektor is too tempting to ignore; Bond's superior, M, orders him to go to Turkey. Once there, Bond forms a comradeship with Darko Kerim, head of the British service's station in Turkey. Bond meets Romanova and they plan their route out of Turkey with the Spektor. He and Kerim believe her story and the three board the Orient Express. Kerim quickly discovers three Soviet MGB agents on board, travelling incognito. He uses bribes and trickery to have two of them taken off the train, but he is later found dead in his compartment with the body of the third MGB agent.

At Trieste a man introduces himself as Captain Nash, a fellow MI6 agent, and Bond presumes he has been sent by M as added protection for the rest of the trip. Romanova is suspicious of Nash, but Bond reassures her that the man is from his own service. After dinner, at which Nash has drugged Romanova, they rest. Nash later wakes Bond, holding him at gunpoint, and reveals himself as the killer Grant. Instead of killing Bond immediately, he describes SMERSH's plan. He is to shoot both of them, throw Romanova's body out the window, and plant a film of their love-making in her luggage; in addition, the Spektor is booby-trapped to explode when examined. As Grant talks, Bond places his metal cigarette case between the pages of a book he holds in front of him, positioning it in front of his heart to stop the bullet. After Grant fires, Bond collapses to the floor and, when Grant steps over him, he attacks and kills the assassin. Bond and Romanova escape.

Later, in Paris, after successfully delivering Romanova and the booby-trapped Spektor to his superiors, Bond meets Rosa Klebb. She is captured but manages to kick Bond with a poisoned blade concealed in her shoe; the story ends with Bond fighting for breath and falling to the floor.

== Background and writing history ==
By January 1956 the author Ian Fleming had published three novels—Casino Royale in 1953, Live and Let Die in 1954 and Moonraker in 1955. A fourth, Diamonds Are Forever, was being edited and prepared for production. (Note: Diamonds Are Forever was published in March 1956.) That month Fleming travelled to his Goldeneye estate in Jamaica to write From Russia, with Love. He followed his usual practice, which he later outlined in Books and Bookmen magazine: "I write for about three hours in the morning ... and I do another hour's work between six and seven in the evening. I never correct anything and I never go back to see what I have written ... By following my formula, you write 2,000 words a day." He returned to London in March that year with a 228-page first-draft manuscript that he subsequently altered more heavily than any of his other works. One of the significant re-writes changed Bond's fate; Fleming had become disenchanted with his books and wrote to his friend, the American author Raymond Chandler: "My muse is in a very bad way ... I am getting fed up with Bond and it has been very difficult to make him go through his tawdry tricks." Fleming re-wrote the end of the novel in April 1956 to make Klebb poison Bond, which allowed him to finish the series with the death of the character if he wanted.

Breathing became difficult. Bond sighed to the depth of his lungs. He clenched his jaws and half closed his eyes, as people do when they want to hide their drunkenness. ... He prised his eyes open. ... Now he had to gasp for breath. Again his hand moved up towards his cold face. He had an impression of Mathis starting towards him. Bond felt his knees begin to buckle ... [he] pivoted slowly on his heel and crashed head-long to the wine-red floor.

From Russia, with Love, novel's closing lines

Fleming's first draft ended with Bond and Romanova enjoying a romance. By January 1957 Fleming had decided he would write another story, and began work on Dr. No in which Bond recovers from his poisoning and is sent to Jamaica.

Fleming's trip to Istanbul in June 1955 to cover an Interpol conference for The Sunday Times was a source of much of the background information in the story. While there he met the Oxford-educated ship owner Nazim Kalkavan, who became the model for Darko Kerim; Fleming took down many of Kalkavan's conversations in a notebook, and used them verbatim in the novel. (Note: While in Turkey, Fleming wrote an account of the Istanbul pogroms, "The Great Riot of Istanbul", which was published in The Sunday Times on 11 September 1955.)

Although Fleming did not date the event within his novels, John Griswold and Henry Chancellor—both of whom wrote books for Ian Fleming Publications—have identified different timelines based on events and situations within the novel series as a whole. Chancellor put the events of From Russia, with Love in 1955; Griswold considers the story to have taken place between June and August 1954. In the novel, General Grubozaboyschikob of the MGB refers to the Istanbul pogrom, the Cyprus Emergency, and the "revolution in Morocco"—a reference to demonstrations in Morocco that forced France to grant independence in November 1955—as recent events.

In August 1956, for fifty guineas, Fleming commissioned Richard Chopping to provide the art for the cover, based on Fleming's design; the result won a number of prizes. After Diamonds Are Forever had been published in March 1956, Fleming received a letter from a thirty-one-year-old Bond enthusiast and gun expert, Geoffrey Boothroyd, criticising the author's choice of firearm for Bond.

I wish to point out that a man in James Bond's position would never consider using a .25 Beretta. It's really a lady's gun—and not a very nice lady at that! Dare I suggest that Bond should be armed with a .38 or a nine millimetre—let's say a German Walther PPK? That's far more appropriate.

Boothroyd's suggestions came too late to be included in From Russia, with Love, but one of the guns—a .38 Smith & Wesson snubnosed revolver modified with one third of the trigger guard removed—was used as the model for Chopping's image. Fleming later thanked Boothroyd by naming the armourer in Dr. No Major Boothroyd.

== Development ==
=== Plot inspirations ===
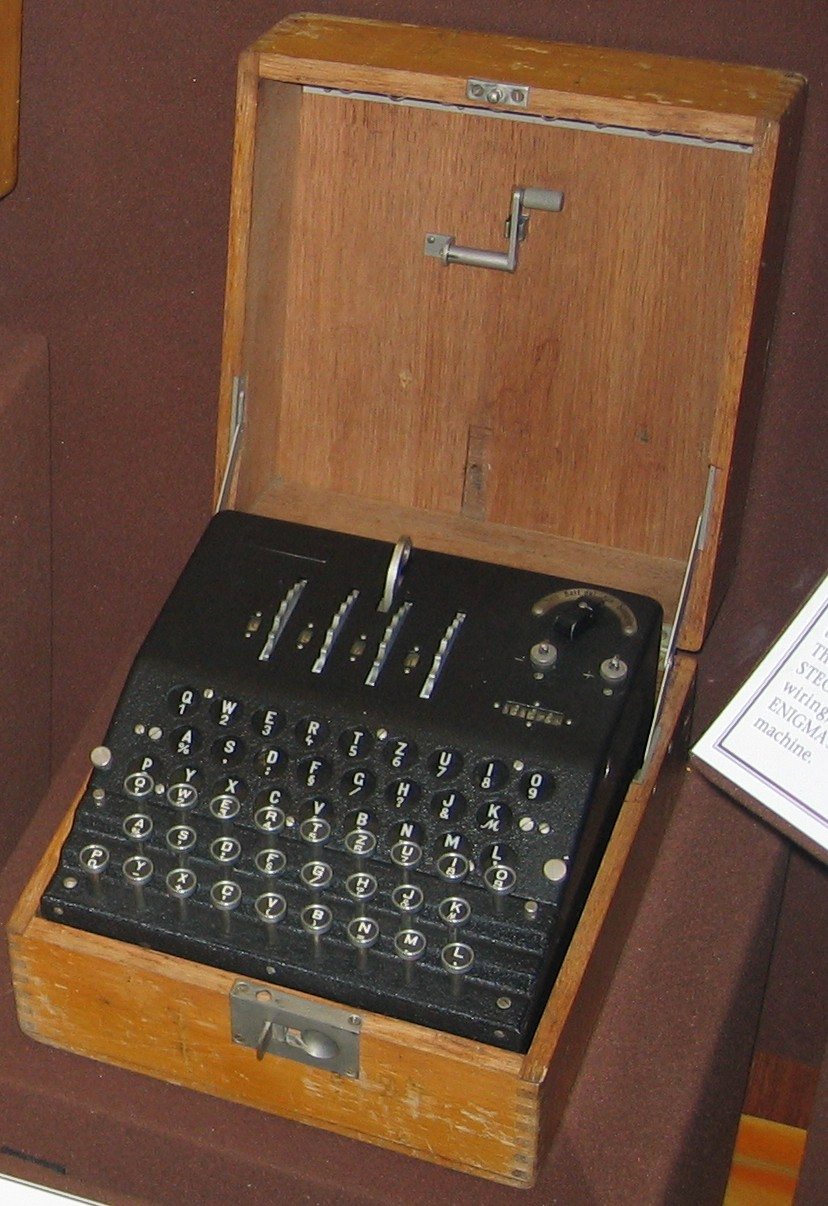
The Enigma machine was used as the basis for the fictional Soviet Spektor decoding machine

As with several of his works, Fleming appropriated the names or backgrounds of people he knew or had heard of for the story's characters: Red Grant, a Jamaican river guide—whom Fleming's biographer Andrew Lycett described as "a cheerful, voluble giant of villainous aspect"—was used for the half-German, half-Irish assassin. Rosa Klebb was partly based on Colonel Rybkina, a real-life member of the Lenin Military-Political Academy about whom Fleming had written an article for The Sunday Times. The Spektor machine used as the bait for Bond was not a Cold War device, but had its roots in the Second World War Enigma machine, which Fleming had tried to obtain while serving in the Naval Intelligence Division.

The idea of the Orient Express came from two sources: Fleming had returned from the Istanbul conference in 1955 by the train, but found the experience drab, partly because the restaurant car was closed. He also knew of the story of Eugene Karp and his journey on the Orient Express: Karp was a US naval attaché and intelligence agent based in Budapest who, in February 1950, took the Orient Express from Budapest to Paris, carrying a number of papers about blown US spy networks in the Eastern Bloc. Soviet assassins were already on the train. The conductor was drugged and Karp's body was found shortly afterwards in a railway tunnel south of Salzburg. Fleming had a long-standing interest in trains and, following his involvement in a near-fatal crash in 1927, associated them with danger; they also feature in Live and Let Die, Diamonds Are Forever and The Man with the Golden Gun.

The cultural historian Jeremy Black points out that From Russia, with Love was written and published at a time when tensions between East and West were on the rise and public awareness of the Cold War was high. A joint British and American operation to tap into landline communication of the Soviet Army headquarters in Berlin using a tunnel into the Soviet-occupied zone had been publicly uncovered by the Soviets in April 1956. The same month the diver Lionel Crabb had gone missing on a mission to photograph the propeller of the Soviet cruiser Ordzhonikidze while the ship was moored in Portsmouth Harbour, an incident that was much reported and discussed in British newspapers. In October and November that year a popular uprising in Hungary was repressed by Soviet forces.

=== Characters ===
To make Bond a more rounded character, Fleming put further aspects of his personality into his creation. The journalist and writer Matthew Parker observes that Bond's "physical and mental ennui" is a reflection of Fleming's poor health and low spirits when he wrote the book. The early depictions of Bond were based on earlier literary characters. In New Statesman, the journalist William Cook writes of the early Bond:

James Bond is the culmination of an important but much-maligned tradition in English literature. As a boy, Fleming devoured the Bulldog Drummond tales of Lieutenant Colonel Herman Cyril McNeile (aka "Sapper") and the Richard Hannay stories of John Buchan. His genius was to repackage these antiquated adventures to fit the fashion of postwar Britain ... In Bond, he created a Bulldog Drummond for the jet age.

Following on from the character development of Bond in his previous four novels, Fleming adds further background to Bond's private life, largely around his home life and personal habits, with Bond's introduction to the story seeing him at breakfast with his housekeeper, May. The novelist Raymond Benson—who later wrote a series of Bond novels—sees aspects of self-doubt entering Bond's mind with the "soft" life he has been leading when he is introduced in the book. Benson identifies Bond's fear when the flight to Istanbul encounters severe turbulence from a storm, and notes Bond's apparent nervousness when he first meets Romanova; he seems concerned and guilty about his mission. The other characters in the book are also well developed, according to Benson. He considers that the head of the Turkish office, Darko Kerim Bey, is "one of Fleming's more colourful characters"; Kerim is a similar type of dependable and appealing ally that Fleming also created with Quarrel (in Live and Let Die) and Enrico Colombo (in the short story "Risico"). Parker considers that Kerim is "an antidote" to Bond's lethargy, while the essayist Umberto Eco sees the character as having some of the moral qualities of the villains in the series, but that those qualities are used in support of Bond.

From Russia, with Love is one of the few stories by Fleming in which the Soviets are the main enemy, although Eco considers Bond's opponents "so monstrous, so improbably evil that it seems impossible to take them seriously". Fleming introduced what was a new development for him, a female opponent for Bond, although much like the former adversaries in the series, Rosa Klebb is described as being physically repulsive, with poor hygiene and gross tastes. Eco—and Anthony Synnott, in his examination of aesthetics in the Bond novels—consider that despite Klebb being female, the character is more akin to a "sexually neuter" individual. Red Grant was Fleming's first "psychotic opponent" for Bond, according to Benson. Charlie Higson—who later wrote the Young Bond series—finds Grant to be "a very modern villain: the relentless, remorseless psycho with the cold dead eyes of a 'drowned man'."

== Style ==
According to Higson, Fleming spent the first four novels changing the style of his books, and his approach to his characters, but in From Russia, with Love the author "finally hits on the classic Bond formula, and he happily moved into his most creative phase". The literary analyst LeRoy L. Panek observes that the previous novels were, in essence, episodic detective stories, while From Russia, with Love is structured differently, with an "extended opening picture" that describes Grant, the Russians and Romanova before moving onto the main story and then bringing back some of the elements when least expected. The extensive prose that describes the Soviet opponents and the background to the mission takes up the first ten chapters of the book, and Bond is only introduced into the story in chapter eleven. Eco says that the opening passage introducing Red Grant is a "cleverly presented" beginning, similar to the opening of a film. (Note: The narrative describes Grant as an immobile man, lying by a swimming pool, waiting to be massaged; it has no direct connection to the main storyline.) Eco remarks that "Fleming abounds in such passages of high technical skill".

Benson describes the "Fleming Sweep" as taking the reader from one chapter to another using "hooks" at the end of chapters to heighten tension and pull the reader onto the next. He feels that the "Fleming Sweep steadily propels the plot" of From Russia, with Love and, though it was the longest of Fleming's novels, "the Sweep makes it seem half as long". Kingsley Amis, who later wrote a Bond novel, considers that the story is "full of pace and conviction", while Parker identifies "cracks" in the plot of the novel, but believes that "the action mov[es] fast enough for the reader to skim over them".

Fleming used known brand names and everyday details to produce a sense of realism, which Amis calls "the Fleming effect". Amis describes "the imaginative use of information, whereby the pervading fantastic nature of Bond's world ... [is] bolted down to some sort of reality, or at least counter-balanced."

== Themes ==
The cultural historians Janet Woollacott and Tony Bennett consider that Fleming's preface note—in which he informs readers that "a great deal of the background to this story is accurate"—indicates that in this novel "cold war tensions are most massively present, saturating the narrative from beginning to end". As in Casino Royale, the concept of the loss of British power and influence during the post-Second World War and Cold War period was also present in the novel. The journalist William Cook observes that, with the British Empire in decline, "Bond pandered to Britain's inflated and increasingly insecure self-image, flattering us with the fantasy that Britannia could still punch above her weight." Woollacott and Bennett agree, and maintain that "Bond embodied the imaginary possibility that England might once again be placed at the centre of world affairs during a period when its world power status was visibly and rapidly declining." In From Russia, with Love, this acknowledgement of decline manifested itself in Bond's conversations with Darko Kerim when he admits that in England "we don't show teeth any more—only gums."

Woollacott and Bennett argue that in selecting Bond as the target for the Soviets, he is "deemed the most consummate embodiment of the myth of England". The literary critic Meir Sternberg sees the theme of Saint George and the Dragon running through several of the Bond stories, including From Russia, with Love. He sees Bond as Saint George—the patron saint of England—in the story, and notes that the opening chapter begins with an examination of a dragonfly as it flies over the supine body of Grant. (Note: Sternberg also points out that in Moonraker, Bond's opponent is named Drax (Drache is German for dragon), while in On Her Majesty's Secret Service (1963) the character Marc-Ange Draco's surname is Latin for dragon, and in From Russia, with Love Darko Kerim's first name is "an anagrammatic variation on the same cover name".)

In From Russia, with Love Fleming wanted to promote a "West is the best" message by creating two parallel characters who would prove Western superiority over the Soviet Union. Two of the novel's most important characters, Romanova and Grant are both defectors who go in opposite directions, and the juxtaposition of the two characters serves to contrast the two systems. According to Takors, Bond both literally and metaphorically seduces Romanova over to the West as he is able to sexually satisfy her in a way that her Russian lovers never could. The way that Bond is portrayed as sexually superior to Russian men was possibly meant by Fleming as a metaphor for how the West was superior to the Soviet Union.

== Publication and reception ==
=== Publication history ===
From Russia, with Love was released in the UK as a hardback on 8 April 1957, by the publishers Jonathan Cape. The American edition was published a few weeks later by Macmillan. Fleming was pleased with the book and later said:

Personally I think from Russia, with Love was, in many respects, my best book, but the great thing is that each one of the books seems to have been a favourite with one or other section of the public and none has yet been completely damned.

In November 1956 the Prime Minister, Sir Anthony Eden, had visited Fleming's Jamaican Goldeneye estate, to recuperate from a breakdown in his health following the Suez Crisis. This was much reported in the British press, and the publication of From Russia, with Love was accompanied by a promotional campaign that capitalised on Fleming's raised public profile. The serialisation of the story in The Daily Express in 1957 provided a boost to the sales of the book; a bigger rise in sales was to follow four years later. In an article in Life on 17 March 1961, the US President John F. Kennedy listed From Russia, with Love as one of his ten favourite books. (Note: Kennedy's brother Robert was also an avid reader of the Bond novels, as was Allen Dulles, the Director of Central Intelligence.) This accolade, and its associated publicity, led to a surge in sales that made Fleming the biggest-selling crime writer in the US. There was a further boost to sales following the release of the film of the same name in 1963, which saw the sales of the Pan paperback rise from 145,000 in 1962 to 642,000 in 1963 and 600,000 in 1964.

In 2023 Ian Fleming Publications—the company that administers all Fleming's literary works—had the Bond series edited as part of a sensitivity review to remove or reword some racial or ethnic descriptors. The rerelease of the series was for the 70th anniversary of Casino Royale, the first Bond novel.

=== Reception ===
From Russia, with Love received mainly positive reviews from critics. Julian Symons, in The Times Literary Supplement, considered that it was Fleming's "tautest, most exciting and most brilliant tale", that the author "brings the thriller in line with modern emotional needs", and that Bond "is the intellectual's Mike Hammer: a killer with a keen eye and a soft heart for a woman". The critic for The Times was less persuaded by the story, suggesting that "the general tautness and brutality of the story leave the reader uneasily hovering between fact and fiction". Although the review compared Fleming in unflattering terms to Peter Cheyney, a crime fiction writer of the 1930s and 1940s, it concluded that From Russia, with Love was "exciting enough of its kind".

The Observer's critic, Maurice Richardson, thought that From Russia, with Love was a "stupendous plot to trap ... Bond, our deluxe cad-clubman agent" and wondered "Is this the end of Bond?" The reviewer for the Oxford Mail declared that "Ian Fleming is in a class by himself", while the critic for The Sunday Times argued that "If a psychiatrist and a thoroughly efficient copywriter got together to produce a fictional character who would be the mid-twentieth century subconscious male ambition, the result would inevitably be James Bond."

Writing in The New York Times, Anthony Boucher—described by a Fleming biographer, John Pearson, as "throughout an avid anti-Bond and an anti-Fleming man"—was damning in his review, saying that From Russia, with Love was Fleming's "longest and poorest book". Boucher further wrote that the novel contained "as usual, sex-cum-sadism with a veneer of literacy but without the occasional brilliant setpieces". The critic for the New York Herald Tribune, conversely, wrote that "Mr Fleming is intensely observant, acutely literate and can turn a cliché into a silk purse with astute alchemy". Robert R Kirsch, writing in the Los Angeles Times, also disagreed with Boucher, saying that "the espionage novel has been brought up to date by a superb practitioner of that nearly lost art: Ian Fleming." In Kirsch's opinion, From Russia, with Love "has everything of the traditional plus the most modern refinements in the sinister arts of spying".

== Adaptations ==
From Russia, with Love was serialised in The Daily Express from 1 April 1957; it was the first Bond novel the paper had adapted. In 1960 the novel was also adapted as a daily comic strip in the paper and was syndicated worldwide. The series, which ran from 3 February to 21 May 1960, was written by Henry Gammidge and illustrated by John McLusky. The comic strip was reprinted in 2005 by Titan Books in the Dr. No anthology, which also included Diamonds Are Forever and Casino Royale.

The film From Russia with Love was released in 1963, produced by Albert R. Broccoli and Harry Saltzman, and directed by Terence Young. It was the second Bond film in the Eon Productions series and starred Sean Connery as Bond. The film version contained some changes to the novel, with the leading villains switching from SMERSH to SPECTRE, a fictional terrorist organisation. In the main it was a faithful adaptation of the novel; the ending was changed to make clear Bond's survival. Benson declares that "many fans consider it the best Bond film, simply because it is close to Fleming's original story".

The novel was dramatised for radio in 2012 by Archie Scottney, directed by Martin Jarvis and produced by Rosalind Ayres; it featured a full cast starring Toby Stephens as James Bond and was first broadcast on BBC Radio 4. It continued the series of Bond radio adaptations featuring Jarvis and Stephens following Dr. No in 2008 and Goldfinger in 2010.

== Notes and references ==
=== Sources ===
- Amis, Kingsley (1966). The James Bond Dossier. London: Pan Books. OCLC 154139618.
- Barnes, Alan; Hearn, Marcus (2001). Kiss Kiss Bang! Bang!: the Unofficial James Bond Film Companion. London: Batsford Books. ISBN 978-0-7134-8182-2.
- Bennett, Tony; Woollacott, Janet (1987). Bond and Beyond: The Political Career of a Popular Hero. London: Routledge. ISBN 978-0-416-01361-0.
- Bennett, Tony; Woollacott, Janet (2009). "The Moments of Bond". In Lindner, Christoph (ed.). The James Bond Phenomenon: a Critical Reader. Manchester: Manchester University Press. pp. 13–34. ISBN 978-0-7190-6541-5.
- Benson, Raymond (1988). The James Bond Bedside Companion. London: Boxtree Ltd. ISBN 978-1-85283-233-9.
- Black, Jeremy (2005). The Politics of James Bond: from Fleming's Novel to the Big Screen. Lincoln, NE: University of Nebraska Press. ISBN 978-0-8032-6240-9. Archived from the original on 23 March 2023.
- Butler, William Vivian (1973). The Durable Desperadoes. London: Macmillan. ISBN 978-0-333-14217-2.
- Chancellor, Henry (2005). James Bond: The Man and His World. London: John Murray. ISBN 978-0-7195-6815-2.
- Eco, Umberto (2009). "The Narrative Structure of Ian Fleming". In Lindner, Christoph (ed.). The James Bond Phenomenon: a Critical Reader. Manchester: Manchester University Press. pp. 34–56. ISBN 978-0-7190-6541-5.
- Faulks, Sebastian; Fleming, Ian (2009). Devil May Care. London: Penguin Books. ISBN 978-0-14-103545-1.
- Fleming, Ian (1957). From Russia, with Love. New York: Macmillan. OCLC 368046.
- Fleming, Ian; Gammidge, Henry; McLusky, John (1988). Octopussy. London: Titan Books. ISBN 978-1-85286-040-0.
- Fleming, Ian; Higson, Charlie (2006). From Russia, with Love. London: Penguin Books. ISBN 978-0-14-102829-3.
- Griswold, John (2006). Ian Fleming's James Bond: Annotations and Chronologies for Ian Fleming's Bond Stories. Bloomington, IN: AuthorHouse. ISBN 978-1-4259-3100-1. Archived from the original on 9 July 2023.
- Halloran, Bernard F (1986). Essays on Arms Control and National Security. Washington, DC: Arms Control and Disarmament Agency. OCLC 14360080.
- Lindner, Christoph (2009). The James Bond Phenomenon: a Critical Reader. Manchester: Manchester University Press. ISBN 978-0-7190-6541-5. Archived from the original on 10 April 2023.
- Lycett, Andrew (1996). Ian Fleming. London: Phoenix. ISBN 978-1-85799-783-5.
- Macintyre, Ben (2008). For Your Eyes Only. London: Bloomsbury Publishing. ISBN 978-0-7475-9527-4.
- McLusky, John; Gammidge, Henry; Hern, Anthony; Fleming, Ian (2009). The James Bond Omnibus Vol. 1. London: Titan Books. ISBN 978-1-84856-364-3.
- Panek, LeRoy (1981). The Special Branch: The British Spy Novel, 1890–1980. Bowling Green, OH: Bowling Green University Popular Press. ISBN 978-0-87972-178-7.
- Parker, Matthew (2014). Goldeneye. London: Hutchinson. ISBN 978-0-09-195410-9.
- Pearson, John (1967). The Life of Ian Fleming: Creator of James Bond. London: Jonathan Cape. OCLC 463251270.
- Takors, Jones (2010). "'The Russians could not longer be the heavies' From Russia with Love and the Cold War in the Bond Series". In Korte, Barbara; Pirker, Eva Ulrike; Helff, Sissy (eds.). Facing the East in the West: Images of Eastern Europe in British Literature, Film and Culture. London: Rodopi. pp. 219–232. ISBN 978-9042030497.
