= Lust in the Dust =

1985 film

- Theatrical release poster
- Directed by: Paul Bartel
- Written by: Philip John Taylor
- Produced by: Allan Glaser; Tab Hunter
- Starring: Tab Hunter; Lainie Kazan; Geoffrey Lewis; Henry Silva; Cesar Romero; Gina Gallego; Divine; Nedra Volz; Courtney Gains
- Cinematography: Paul Lohmann
- Edited by: Alan Toomayan
- Music by: Peter Matz; Karen Hart
- Production company: Fox Run Productions
- Distributed by: New World Pictures
- Release date: March 1, 1985
- Running time: 84 minutes
- Country: United States
- Language: English
- Budget: $2.5 million

Lust in the Dust is a 1985 American Western comedy film directed by Paul Bartel, written by Philip John Taylor, and starring: Tab Hunter, Divine, Lainie Kazan and Cesar Romero.

== Plot ==
Dance-hall girl Rosie Velez, lost in the desert, is helped to safety by gunman Abel Wood. In the town of Chili Verde, at the saloon of Marguerita Ventura, word of a treasure in gold brings Abel into conflict with outlaw Hard Case Williams and his gang.

== Cast ==
- Tab Hunter as Abel Wood
- Divine as Rosie Velez
- Lainie Kazan as Marguerita Ventura
- Cesar Romero as Father Garcia
- Geoffrey Lewis as Hardcase Williams
- Henry Silva as Bernardo
- Courtney Gains as Richard "Red Dick" Barker
- Gina Gallego as Ninfa
- Nedra Volz as Ed "Big Ed"
- Woody Strode as Blackman
- Pedro Gonzalez Gonzalez as Mexican

== Production ==
The title was taken from the nickname given to King Vidor's 1946 film Duel in the Sun. John Waters was asked to direct, but refused because he did not write the script. Edith Massey was cast as Big Ed, but died shortly after her screen test. Paul Bartel was uneasy about casting her because he thought it would look too much like a John Waters film without John Waters.

The role of Marguerita Ventura was originally set for Chita Rivera. Principal photography took place in Santa Fe, New Mexico. In the original script, Rosie Velez (Divine) was supposed to die but the filmmakers changed their mind during filming.

== Reception ==
Variety described the film as "a saucy, irreverent, quite funny send-up of the Western" and said that it "takes some of the old-time conventions – the silent stranger, the saloon singer with a past, the motley crew of crazed gunslingers, the missing stash of gold – and stands them on their head with outrageous comedy and imaginative casting." Kenneth Turan of California called it "raunchy but irresistible," while Stephen Schaefer of US said "Lust in the Dust is a wicked must" and described it as "a happy hoot", concluding that it "knows how to mine the gold quickly and leave 'em laughing." George Williams of The Sacramento Bee described the film as "an irresistibly funny spoof on those Clint Eastwood-Sergio Leone movies called Spaghetti Westerns" and stated that the actors "all give us the feeling they're having a lot of fun — and we can't help but join in." Most of the mirth comes from the situations and the characterizations." Peter Stack of the San Francisco Chronicle called the film "a gun totin' rootin-tootin' New Mexico-style cowboy yarn loaded with surprisingly good performances" and praised Lainie Kazan's acting in particular.

Sheila Benson of the Los Angeles Times said that the film's satire was "limp", and that it resorted to "dumb, sniggering sexual innuendo," while Vincent Canby of The New York Times described the film's jokes as "witless and private". Critic Rex Reed opined that the film "produces the kind of green reaction you get from eating a rancid burrito." Addressing Canby and Reed's reviews, Peter Travers of People said: "Well, what did they expect from a whacked-out Western parody starring has-been '50s hunk Tab Hunter and 300-pound female impersonator Divine—High Noon?" and that the film delivers "tacky, hit-and-miss hilarity" with moments that offer "more laughs than a barrel full of teenage sex comedies." He praised the performances and concluded that "those in search of a smattering of cheap laughs will find Lust in the Dust the perfect oasis."

Lust in the Dust holds a 25% rating on Rotten Tomatoes based on eight reviews.

Divine was nominated for the Golden Raspberry Award for Worst Actor at the 6th Golden Raspberry Awards.
