= The Burning Hills =

1956 film by Stuart Heisler

- Original film poster
- Directed by: Stuart Heisler
- Screenplay by: Irving Wallace
- Based on: The Burning Hills; 1956 novel by Louis L'Amour
- Produced by: Richard Whorf
- Starring: Tab Hunter; Natalie Wood
- Cinematography: Ted D. McCord
- Edited by: Clarence Kolster
- Music by: David Buttolph
- Color process: Warnercolor
- Production company: Warner Bros. Pictures
- Distributed by: Warner Bros. Pictures
- Release date: September 1956
- Running time: 92 minutes
- Country: United States
- Language: English
- Box office: $1.5 million

The Burning Hills is a 1956 American CinemaScope Western directed by Stuart Heisler and starring Tab Hunter and Natalie Wood, based on a 1956 novel by Louis L'Amour.

== Plot ==
When Trace Jordan's brother is murdered and several of their horses stolen, Trace sees by the tracks that three men are involved. One man wears Mexican spurs, one walks with a limp, and one smokes cheroots. Upon arriving in the town of Esperanza, Trace sees a destroyed sheriff's office and discovers the only law in Esperanza is Joe Sutton. He also discovers that the stolen horses have been rebranded with the Sutton brand, and their riders who match the description of their tracks work for Sutton. Trace enters Joe Sutton's ranch and wounds him in a shooting.

The enraged Sutton sends his son Jack, his foreman Ben and ten ranch hands to track down Trace before he goes to an Army fort to bring law to Esperanza. Wounded in his escape, Trace is helped by a courageous half Mexican woman named Maria Colton. Unable to locate the hidden Trace, Joe Sutton enlists a half Indian tracker, Jacob Lantz.

== Cast ==
- Tab Hunter as Trace Jordan
- Natalie Wood as Maria-Christina Colton
- Skip Homeier as Jack Sutton
- Eduard Franz as Jacob Lantz
- Earl Holliman as Mort Bayliss
- Claude Akins as Ben Hindeman
- Ray Teal as Joe Sutton
- Frank Puglia as Tio Perico
- Hal Baylor as Braun
- Tyler MacDuff as Wes Parker
- Rayford Barnes as Veach
- Tony Terry as Vincente Colton

== Production ==
Louis L'Amour said he wrote the novel for Gary Cooper and Katy Jurado. Jurado tried to buy film rights to the novel.

L'Amour's short story "The Gift of Cochise" had been successfully filmed with John Wayne in 1953 as Hondo and there was interest in The Burning Hills. Warner Bros. Pictures purchased the screen rights in May 1955 and assigned it to Richard Whorf to produce. Irving Wallace wrote the script and John Wayne was announced as a possible star. In December 1955 Tab Hunter was assigned to the lead.

The book ended up selling over a million copies.

Filming started February 1956.

== Reception ==
Variety said "With the youthful filmgoer in mind, the combo of Tab Hunter and Natalie Wood in “The Burning Hills” could prove to be a profitable one. They form a team, of somewhat younger stars than is customarily found in sagebrush sagas and do an okay job of the outdoor assignment. The accent on youth in a western plot at least has its novelty value and the teenage fans should like their favorites in this prairie drama."
