= Algie the Miner =

1912 film

Algie, the Miner
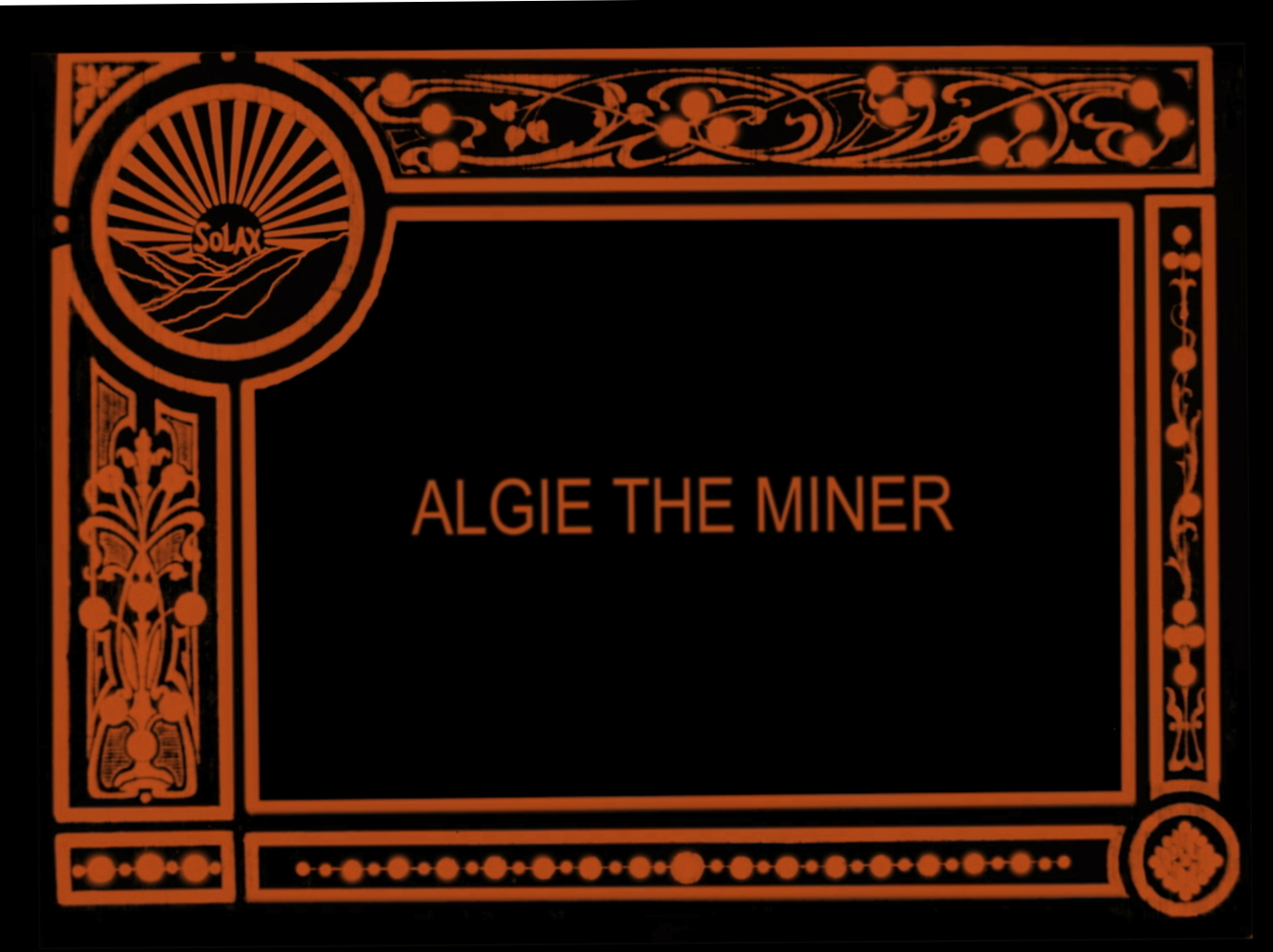
- Title card
- Directed by: Harry Schenck; Edward Warren; Alice Guy
- Produced by: Alice Guy
- Starring: Billy Quirk
- Distributed by: Solax Studios
- Release date: February 28, 1912
- Running time: 9 minutes
- Country: United States
- Languages: Silent; English intertitles

Algie, the Miner is a 1912 American pre-code silent Western film produced by Solax Studios. It was directed by Harry Schenck, Edward Warren, and Alice Guy and stars Billy Quirk, with Clarice Jackson as Miss Lyons.

The film was advertised as: "A real live western comedy, showing how a sissy boy won his sweetheart's hands by going out west and making a man of himself". The film has been commonly regarded as the first to feature a queer character.

== Plot ==
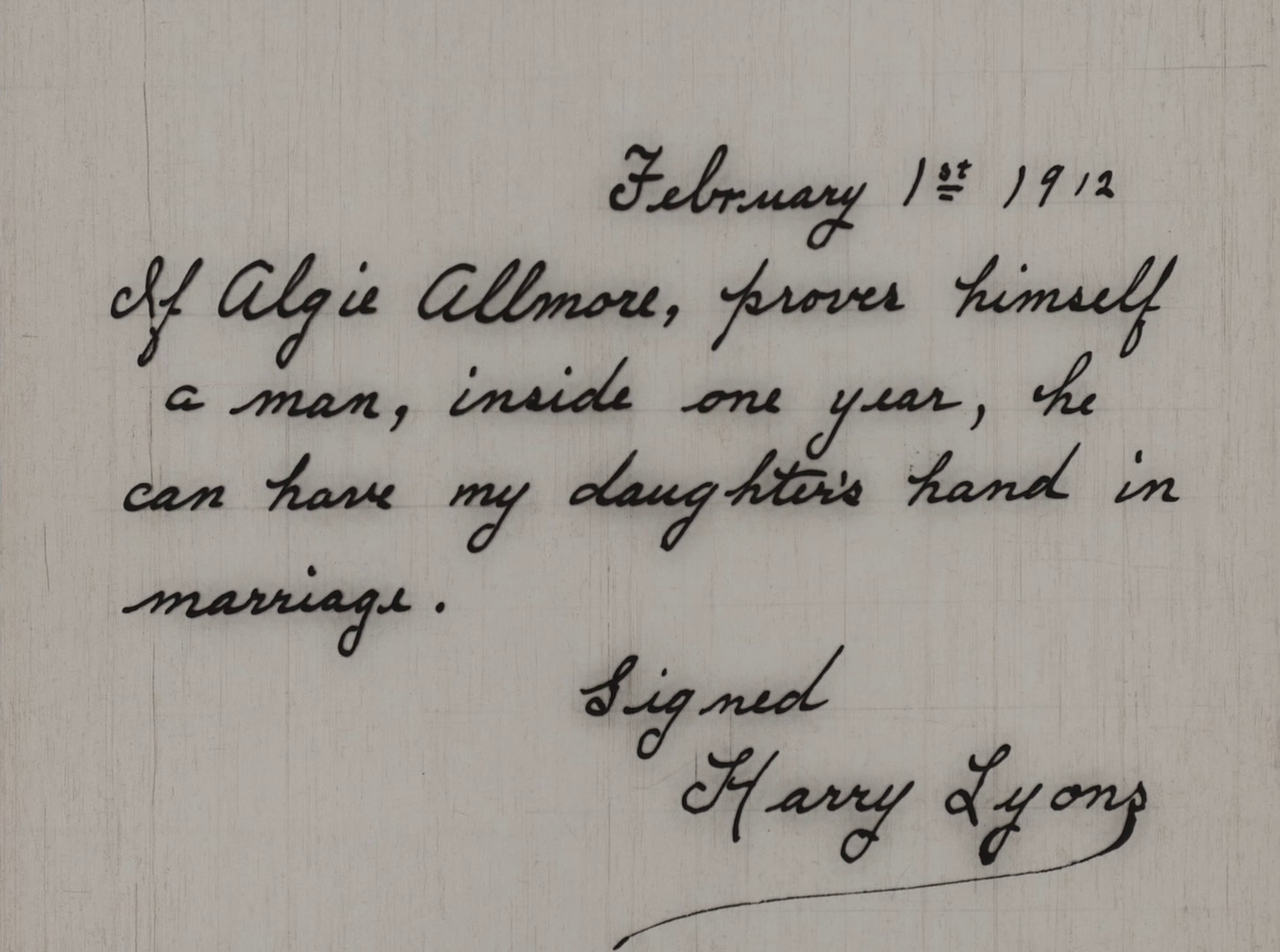
The letter

Algie the Miner (1912)

During a wealthy family's party, Algie informs Mr Lyons that he wishes to marry the man's daughter. Lyons writes out a letter that reads: "February 1st, 1912 / If Algie Allmore, proves himself a man, inside one year, he can have my daughter's hand in marriage. / Signed Harry Lyons".

Algie takes the letter, goes home, packs a small suitcase, tucks a tiny pistol into his waistband, and travels by train to the west. When he arrives two cowboys laugh at Algie and his "sissy" ways, and introduces him to the toughest cowboy of them all. A title card reads: "Algie's education is confided to Big Jim". Big Jim, a heavy drinker, shares his cabin with the newcomer, and frightens Algie by giving him a full-sized pistol. He teaches Algie how to ride a horse.

The next title card reads: "The Demon Drink, Algie begins to fill his contract". Two cowboys bring staggering-drunk Jim home, and the man appears to be hallucinating. Algie gets his friend onto his bunk, and shows great concern for the man's condition.

Later Big Jim and Algie begin digging into a hillside with pickaxes. Gold is discovered, Algie is given a second pistol, and he leaves the scene. Two outlaws attack Big Jim, and as he struggles with the men Algie returns, with both pistols aimed at the criminals.

Algie and Big Jim go into a bar, but Algie doesn't let his friend drink liquor. He scolds the cowboys who are trying to get Jim to drink, and the two leave together.

A year goes by and a title cards reads: "Come Jim and see me claim my girl". Algie shows Jim a calendar while explaining his story, and the cowboy shows happiness over the news.

The final title card reads: "Back East a Western way of ringing a door bell". Algie and Big Jim travel to the east, and Big Jim fires his pistol on the Lyons' porch, frightening everyone inside. The pair barge into the house, Algie shows Mr Lyons the letter he'd been given and demands his sweetheart's hand in marriage. Mr Lyons is reluctant to keep his promise to allow Algie to marry his daughter, but Big Jim draws his pistol from his holster, and Mr Lyons stops protesting.

== Cast ==
- Billy Quirk – Algie Allmore
- Clarice Jackson – Miss Lyons
- Mary Foy – Society Dowager

== Release ==
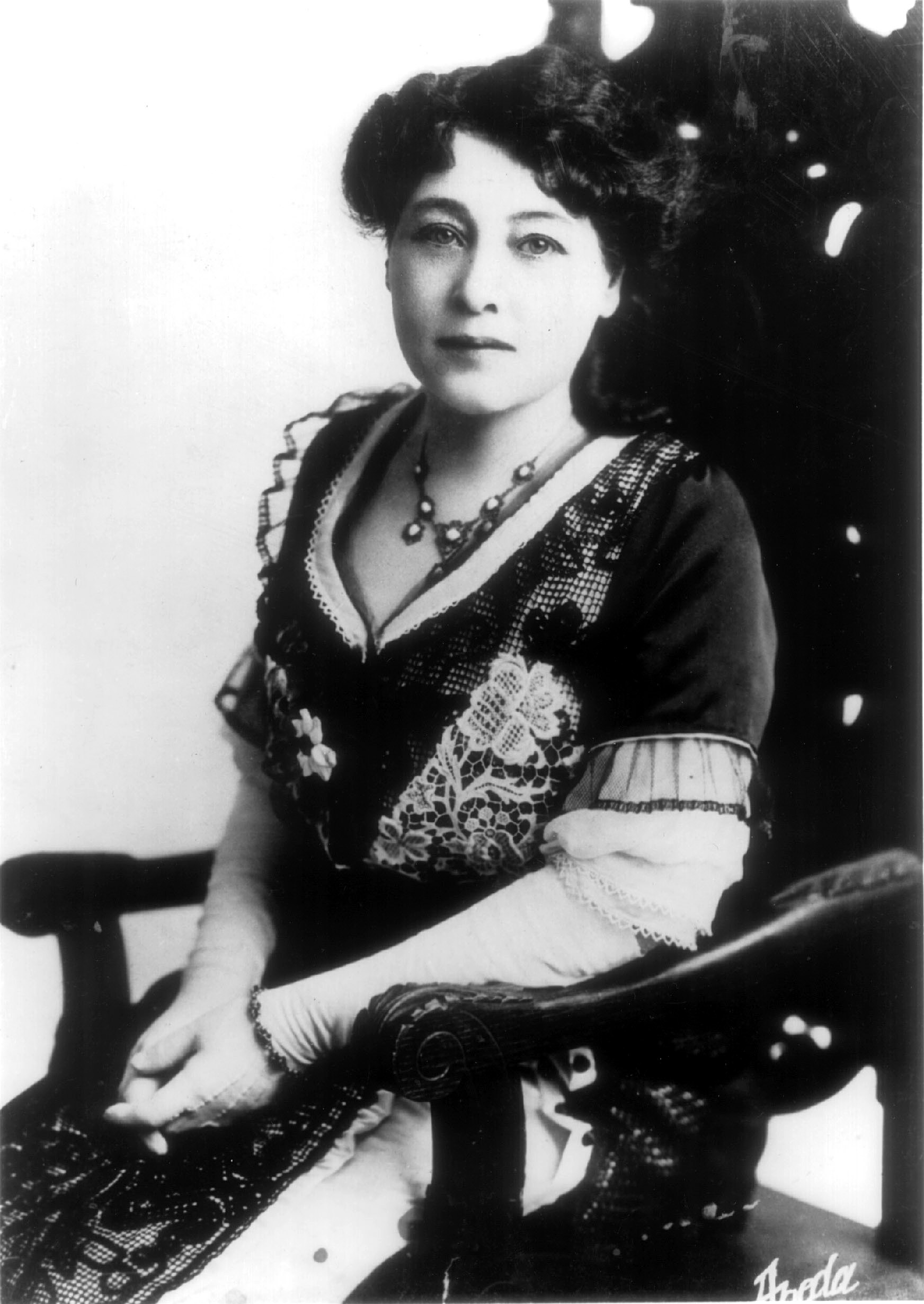
The film's producer and director, Alice Guy-Blaché

The film was released on February 28, 1912. During the early days of motion pictures one-reel films, approximately ten-minutes long, were made to be shown as part of a variety show, either in vaudeville theaters, along with live acts featuring singers or comedians, or at a nickelodeon movie theater where the audience paid five cents to view a half-hour of short films. Algie the Miner was shown at both types of theaters. While most early short films were only circulated to theaters for a few months Algie the Miner was advertised as being shown in theaters more than two years after its release.

In 1996, Algie the Miner was featured in the American documentary film The Celluloid Closet, directed by Rob Epstein and Jeffrey Friedman. The film is based on Vito Russo's 1981 book The Celluloid Closet: Homosexuality in the Movies.

=== Home media ===
In June 2007, in honor of Gay Pride month, Turner Classic Movies cable channel ran a series throughout the month, titled Screened Out, which featured American movies from 1912 to 1970 that dealt with homosexuality. There were forty-four films in total, that ranged from silent films to mainstream hits. The series premiered with Algie, the Miner. The series was based on film historian Richard Barrios's 2005 book Screened Out: Playing Gay in Hollywood from Edison to Stonewall. Barrios commented that "what people don't realize is that 77 years ago homosexual themes were considered viable enough to be part of mainstream entertainment." (Note: Homosexual themes stopped in 1934 with the adoption of the Motion Picture Production Code, "which set standards so stringent that for 20 years thereafter, movie married couples had to sleep in twin beds, and any open mention of homosexuality was strictly forbidden.")

In 2018, the short was released on DVD and Blu-ray to two different collections. The first collection is a four-disc DVD box-set, from Lobster Films, titled Les Pionniėres du cinéma, and the second is Kino Lorber's six-disc Blu-ray box-set titled Pioneers: First Women Filmmakers, which was made with cooperation from the Library of Congress and the British Film Institute. The Blu-ray box-set features commentary from film scholars Gaylyn Studlar and Anthony Slide.

== Critical analysis and reception ==
=== Analysis ===
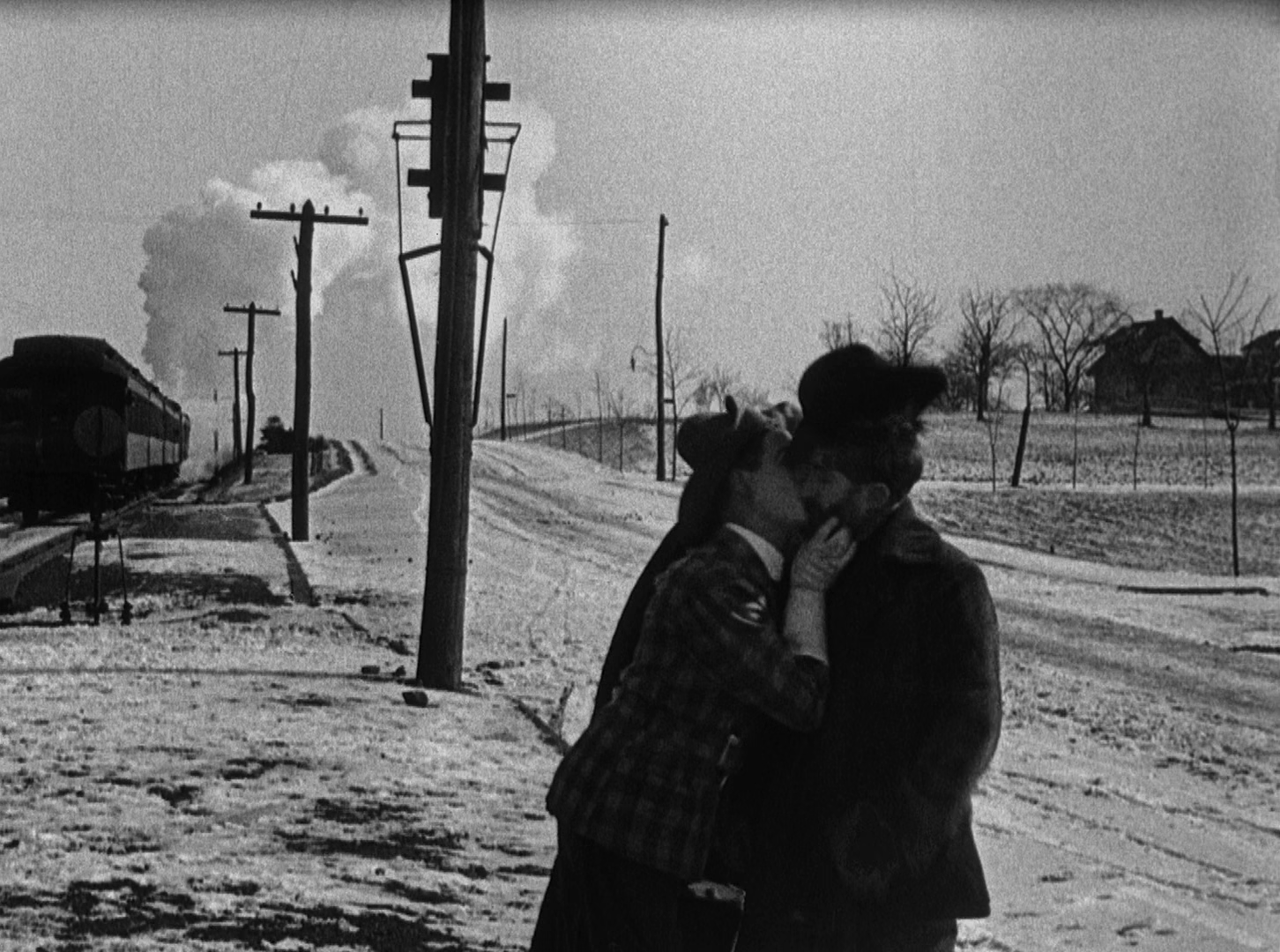
Algie kissing a cowboy after he arrives out west

Author Shane Brown says that Algie is an early appearance of the sissy in American film, a "stock character" who later became a comedy staple in future films during that time period. Brown goes on to say that the 1910s iteration of this character is less about the character's sexuality, but instead, it is more of an indicator of the period's gender politics and societal expectations regarding masculinity.

Guy-Blaché's biographer, Alison McMahan, contends that "at the diegetic level of narration, the movie is about Algie becoming more virile, skilled and confident", but at the same time, the film is also a love story between two men. McMahan also stated that to assuage American social norms, Guy-Blaché added the girlfriend subplot, but as is apparent, the girlfriend really has no role in the film. Film academic Richard Barrios agrees, arguing that, "Algie is heterosexual in only that he has a girlfriend."

Authors Manuel Hernández-Pérez and Juan Sánchez-Soriano said the film is regarded as the first production to feature a queer character. They note that even though Algie has a girlfriend, his character's queerness "shows through in everything he says and does", citing the scene where Algie is shown with "painted lips" and effeminate hand movements, that are often associated with the queer identify.

It has long been a source of wonder to me that many women have not seized upon the wonderful opportunities offered to them by the motion-picture art to make their way to fame and fortune as producers of photodramas.

— Alice Guy-Blaché, (1914 essay)

Queer film historian Andrew Grossman observed that "dandyism and cross-dressing" were pretty common tropes in the early days of silent slapstick [...] however, Guy-Blaché went beyond the superficial role of "gender confusion", and instead, she presented an "ambisexual hero rather than a cross-dressed farceur." Grossman further states:

American film director Bret Wood's assertion that 'Algies character is defined as gay through certain visual indicators of behavior and dress', not only fails to appreciate the perversities of silent clowning, but makes little sense within the framework of the story. Algie's goal, after all, is to marry a woman, a desire that is apparently sincere and not some sort of situational ruse.

British author Anthony Slide stated that "despite Algie being heterosexual, the performance that Blaché has Quirk deliver is totally effeminate and perpetuates a gay stereotype", and while the film "may or may not be a pioneering gay film", it is an early example of a common trope in Westerns: the sophisticated easterner arrives out west and is seen as effeminate by the local cowboys.

=== Reception ===
Pamela Hutchinson wrote in Sight and Sound that "as this is a comedy, the direction of travel is towards reconciliation rather than revenge — though a gun will be turned on the patriarch whose retrogressive gender policing has set the plot in motion." The Moving Picture World wrote "Algie is a lackadaisical, girlish youth; the film is very well photographed and the characters are surely 'put over'; it is no comedy; it may get through as a tract, but it is very vulgar."

Richard Barrios opined that Algie is a "card-carrying flamer; all the mannerisms are there for the filmmakers to heighten and caricature: the dandified air, fluttering hands, pursed and apparently rouged lips, sly smile, and eyes that he bats while fondling the barrel of a pistol which he examines as if it were cloisonné." Moving Picture News said "Algie's sissy manner makes him look like a jellyfish, or a milk and water baby of the touch-me-not-ain't-you-rough variety."

Critic Henry Mach remarked that "Algie gives us limp-wristed comic Billy Quirk trying to prove his manhood, but merely demonstrating why we've never heard of Billy Quirk; the value of the short is not as great filmmaking, but because of what it shows us about an earlier era; this 10-minute snippet reminds us that 'sissyboys' were always with us, as was gay bashing."

== See also ==
- 1912 in film
- List of LGBTQ-related films pre-1920
- List of films in the public domain in the United States
