= Howard Rosenman =

American film producer

- Born: Zvi Howard Rosenman; February 1, 1945 (age 81); New York City, U.S.
- Education: Brooklyn College
- Occupation: Producer
- Years active: 1969–present

Zvi Howard Rosenman (born February 1, 1945) is an American producer and motion picture executive. He specializes in producing romantic comedy films and documentary films. Some of his most popular productions include Father of the Bride (1991) starring Steve Martin and Diane Keaton, Joss Whedon's Buffy the Vampire Slayer (1992) and The Family Man (2000) starring Nicolas Cage. Rosenman's documentary film Common Threads: Stories from the Quilt won the Peabody Award and the 1990 Academy Award for Best Documentary Feature; his film The Celluloid Closet also won the Peabody Award.

== Life and career ==
Rosenman was born in Brooklyn, New York and grew up in Far Rockaway, Queens, the son of Sima (née Rosenfeld) and Morris Joseph Rosenman, Ashkenazi Jewish parents from Israel whose families had lived in the Old City of Jerusalem and Mea Shearim for seven generations, but immigrated to the United States in the wake of Arab pogroms. Rosenman graduated from Brooklyn College with a degree in European Literature in 1965. In 1967, he took a leave from medical school at Hahnemann Medical College to serve as an extern medic in the Six-Day War as a part of the Israel Defense Forces. After the war, he met his mentor, the composer Leonard Bernstein, who encouraged him to leave medical school after two years and begin his career in show business. Rosenman's first job was on Broadway assisting Katharine Hepburn in the André Previn musical Coco in 1969. Also, on Broadway, he assisted the director, Sir Michael Benthall (former head of Britain's National Theatre/Old Vic), on I'm Solomon and Her First Roman. He then became a producer of commercials for the ad agency Benton & Bowles, winning two Clio Awards on campaigns for Cool Whip and Almond Joy.

For his first feature film Sparkle, he served as its producer and collaborated with Joel Schumacher on its story. With producing partner Renée Missel, Rosenman went on to make the film The Main Event starring Barbra Streisand and Ryan O'Neal and Resurrection starring Ellen Burstyn and Sam Shepard. Resurrection received two Academy Award nominations.

He served as Co-President of Production at Sandollar, manager Sandy Gallin's and performer Dolly Parton's production company, from 1985–1992. While co-heading production at Sandollar with producer Carol Baum, he produced Father of the Bride, Buffy the Vampire Slayer, Gross Anatomy starring Matthew Modine (about Rosenman's years in medical school), Straight Talk starring Dolly Parton, Sidney Lumet's A Stranger Among Us, Shining Through starring Melanie Griffith and Michael Douglas, and Harvey Fierstein's Tidy Endings for HBO, which garnered two Emmy Award nominations and two CableACE Awards.

Also during this time, Rosenman served as Executive Producer of the Oscar-winning Common Threads: Stories from the Quilt by Rob Epstein and Jeffrey Friedman. Rosenman collaborated with Epstein and Friedman on two more documentary films: The Celluloid Closet in 1995, which was nominated for four Emmy Awards, and Paragraph 175 in 2000.

He served as President of Production at Brillstein-Grey Entertainment from 1992–1994. While at Brillstein-Grey Entertainment, he oversaw initial development of The Cable Guy starring Jim Carrey and Mike Nichols's What Planet Are You From?.

He subsequently formed Howard Rosenman Productions and produced The Family Man, Noel starring Susan Sarandon, Penélope Cruz and Robin Williams and You Kill Me starring Sir Ben Kingsley and Téa Leoni.

In 2007, Rosenman was the Executive Producer on the David Milch surfing series John from Cincinnati for HBO.

Rosenman made his acting debut in Gus Van Sant's Milk playing the role of David Goodstein (founder of The Advocate) opposite Sean Penn as Harvey Milk.

Rosenman is Co-Founder of Project Angel Food in Los Angeles, a meals-on-wheels program for people living with life-threatening diseases including AIDS and cancer.

== Filmography ==
He was a producer in all films unless otherwise noted.

=== Film ===
Year	Film	Credit
1976	Sparkle	
1979	The Main Event	Executive producer
1980	Resurrection	
1989	Lost Angels	
1989	Gross Anatomy	
1991	True Identity	Executive producer
1991	Father of the Bride	
1992	Shining Through	
1992	Straight Talk	Executive producer
1992	A Stranger Among Us	
1992	Buffy the Vampire Slayer	
2000	The Family Man	
2001	My First Mister	Co-executive producer
2001	American Neurotic	Executive producer
2004	Noel	
2007	You Kill Me	
2007	Breakfast with Scot	Executive producer
2009	Jonah	
2012	Sparkle	Executive producer
2016	Lazy Eye	Executive producer
2017	Call Me by Your Name	
2019	Shepherd: The Story of a Jewish Dog	
TBA	Anita	

As an actor

Year	Film	Role
2008	Milk	David Goodstein
2011	Coming & Going	Creator
2012	Should've Been Romeo	Henry
2012	Sparkle	Landlord

As writer

Year	Film
1976	Sparkle
1989	Gross Anatomy
2012	Sparkle

=== Television ===
Year	Title	Credit	Notes
1973	Isn't It Shocking?		Television film
1974	Killer Bees		Television film
1974	Virginia Hill	Executive producer	Television film
1975	All Together Now	Executive producer	Television film
1975	Death Scream		Television film
1988	Tidy Endings	Executive producer	Television film
2002	Bond Girls Are Forever	Co-executive producer	Documentary
2007	John from Cincinnati	Executive producer	
