= Social Media Kings Into Queens =

- RuPaul's Drag Race episode
- Episode no.: Season 10; Episode 10
- Original air date: May 24, 2018

Guest appearances
- Miles Heizer (guest judge); Lizzo (guest judge); Anthony Padilla; Chester See; Frankie Grande; Kingsley; Raymond Braun; Tyler Oakley

Episode chronology
← Previous "Breastworld"	Next → "Evil Twins"
- RuPaul's Drag Race season 10

"Social Media Kings Into Queens" is the tenth episode of the tenth season of the American reality competition television series RuPaul's Drag Race, which originally aired on VH1 on May 24, 2018. The episode's mini-challenge has contestants dress as "butch" men and promote a perfume called Trade. The main challenge tasks contestants with giving makeovers to a social media personalities. Miles Heizer and Lizzo are judges, alongside regular panelists RuPaul, Michelle Visage, and Ross Mathews. Miz Cracker wins the main challenge. Monét X Change is eliminated from the competition after placing in the bottom two and losing a lip-sync contestant against Kameron Michaels to "Good as Hell" by Lizzo.

== Episode ==
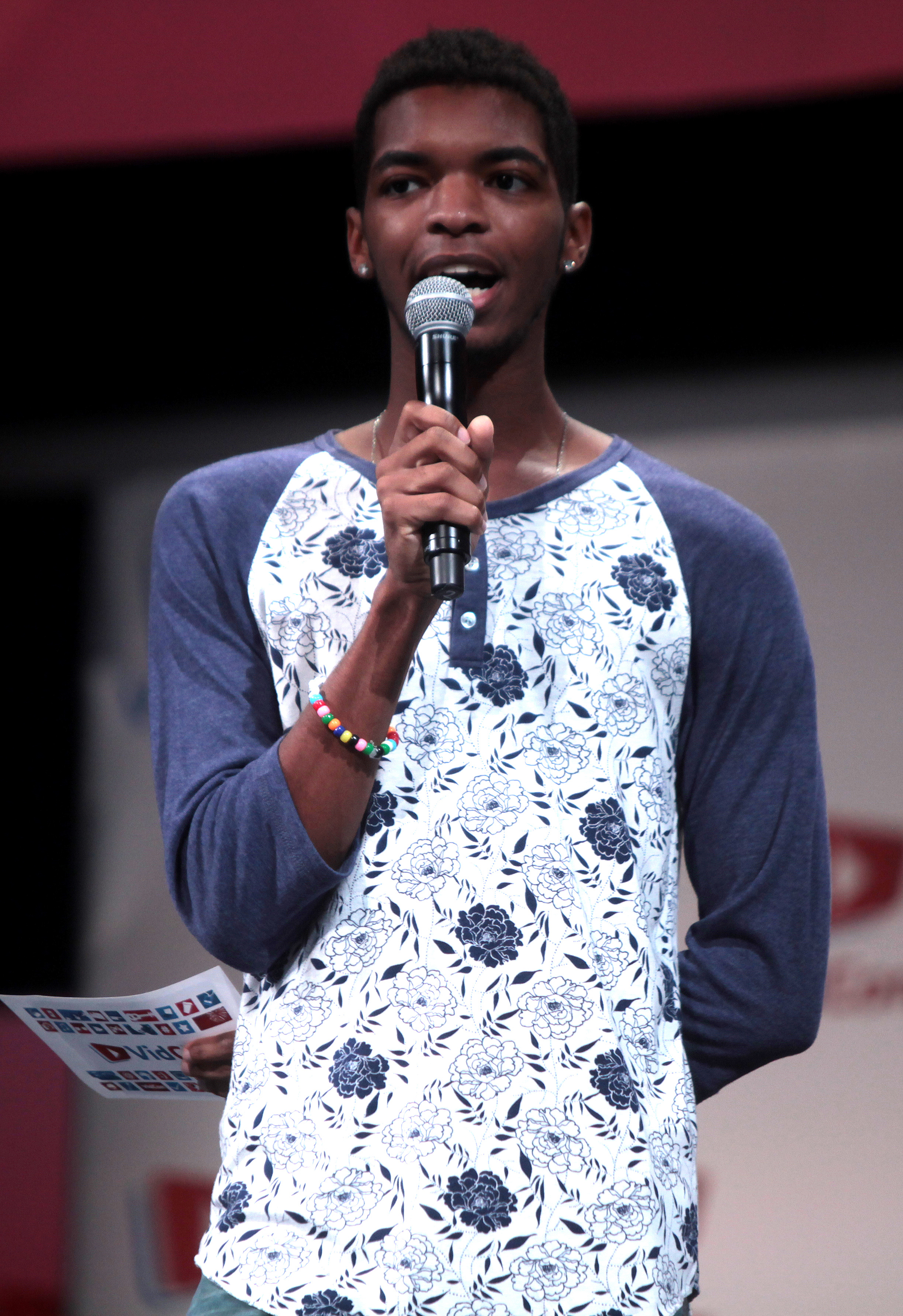
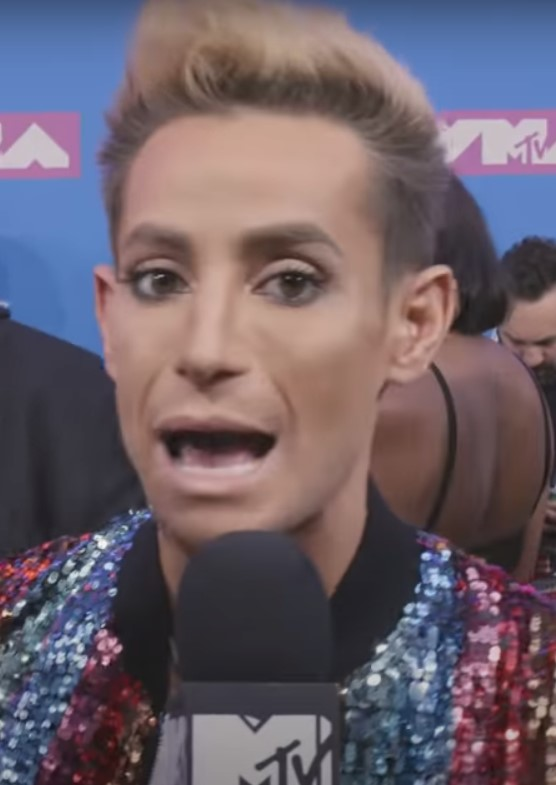
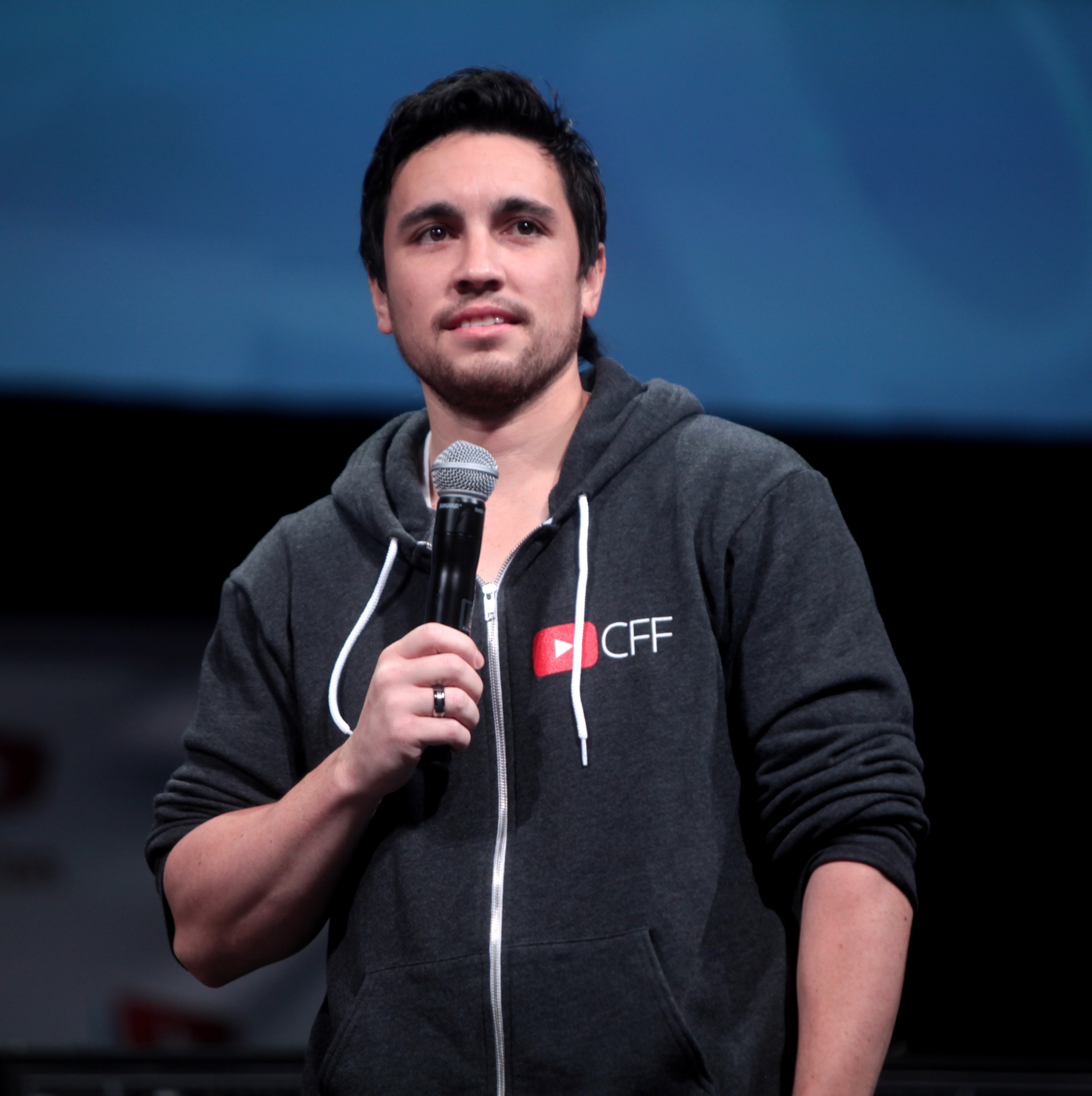
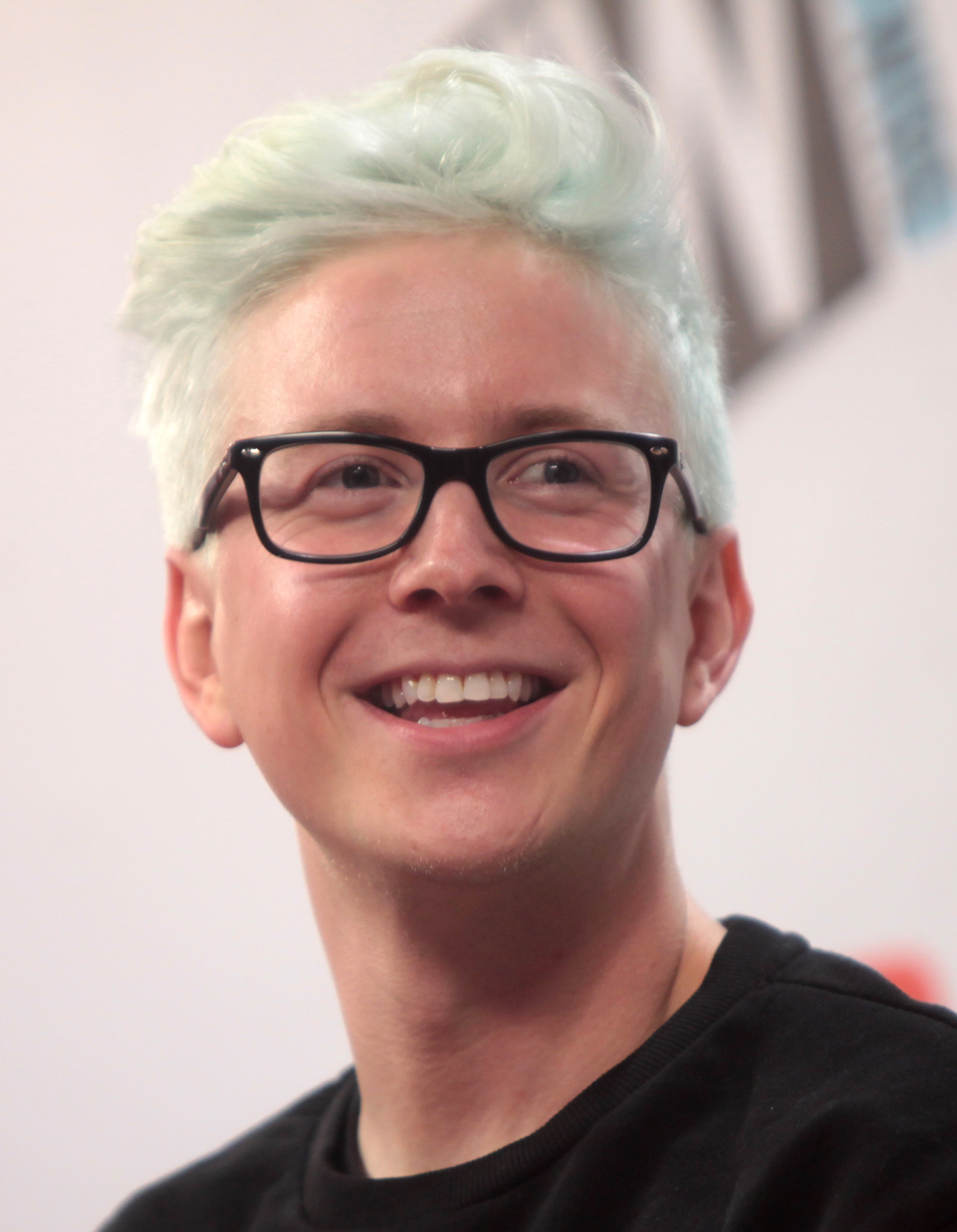
Kingsley (top left, pictured in 2014), Frankie Grande (top right), Chester See (bottom left, pictured in 2014), and Tyler Oakley (bottom right, pictured in 2014) receive makeovers.

For the mini-challenge, the six remaining contestants are tasked with appearing in a commercial that promotes RuPaul's perfume for men, titled "Trade". Each contestant is to dress as "butch" men and deliver comedic improvisations. Eureka wins. As the winner of the mini challenge, she is tasked by RuPaul to pair each contestant with six special guests for a make-over challenge. Aquaria is paired with YouTube star Kingsley, Asia O'Hara and Raymond Braun, Eureka and Frankie Grande, Kameron Michaels and Anthony Padilla, Miz Cracker and Chester See, and Monét X Change with Tyler Oakley. Additionally, each pair must take part in a home-made music video to RuPaul's song "Charisma Uniqueness Nerve and Talent".

RuPaul introduces the runway category, "Drag Family Resemblance". On the main stage, Asia O'Hara and Eureka, alongside their drag daughters America O'Hara and Eufreaka, received positive reviews for their performances and make-overs, but are declared safe. Miz Cracker and her drag daughter Miz Cookie are commended for their performances, make-over, and chemistry, and are deemed the winners of the challenge. The bottom contestants of the week were Aquaria, Kameron and Monét X Change, who were criticized for not having a make-over resemblance to their drag daughters Capricia Corn, Kelly Michaels, and Short Change, respectively. Aquaria is declared safe, while Kameron Michaels and Monét X Change lip-synced to "Good as Hell" by Lizzo. Kameron Michaels wins the lip-sync and Monét X Change is eliminated from the competition.

== Production and broadcast ==
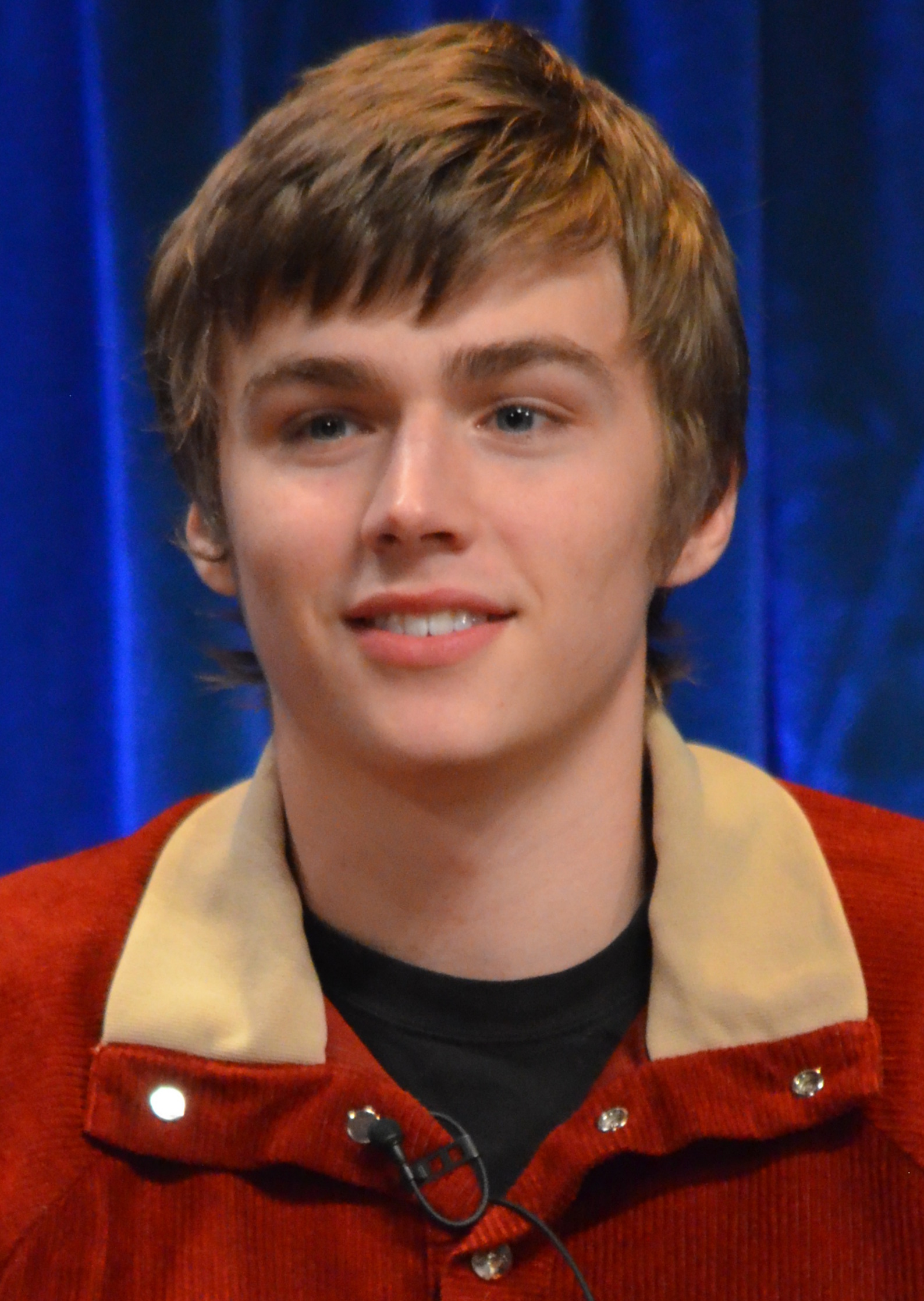
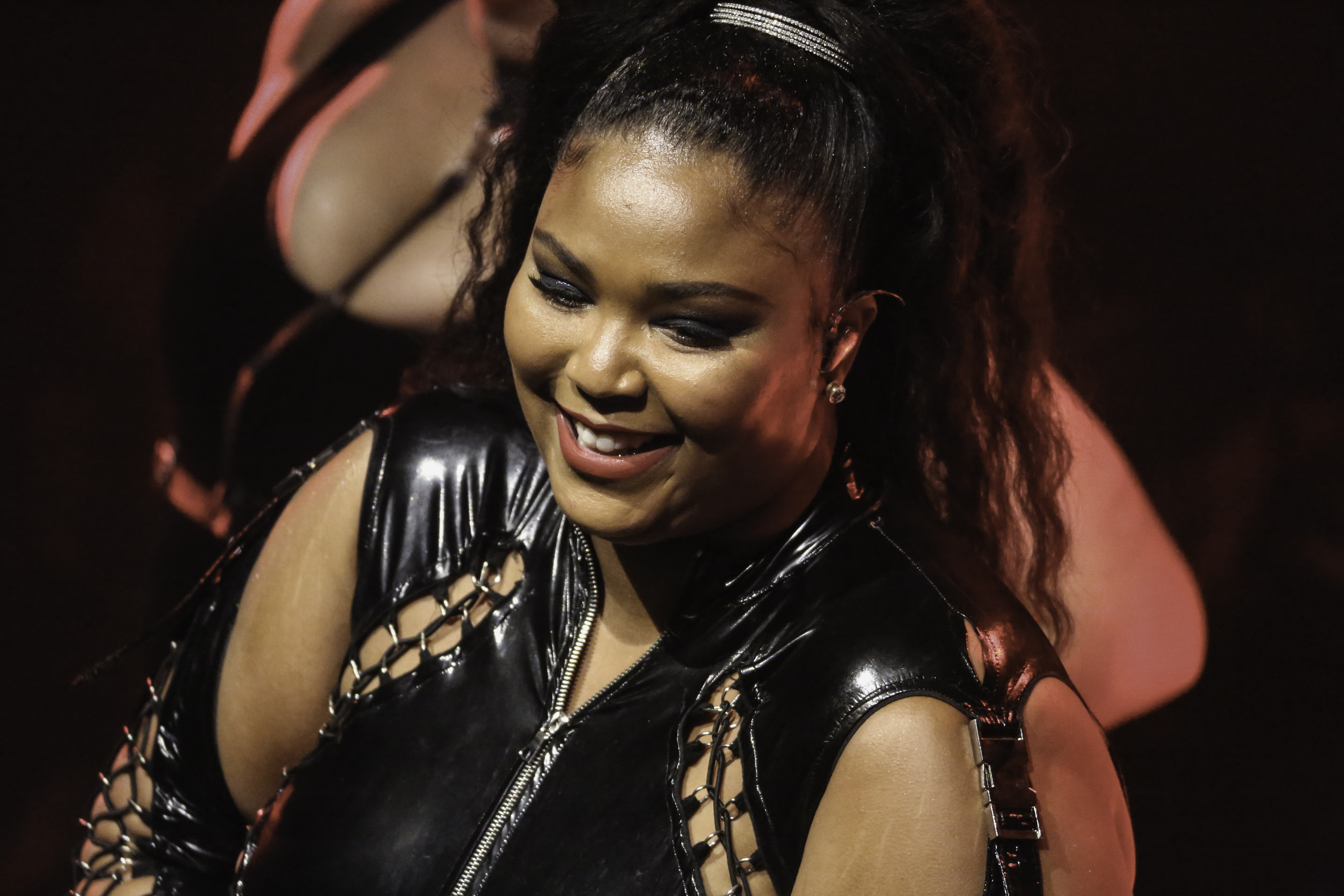
Miles Heizer (left, pictured in 2013) and Lizzo (right, pictured in 2018) are guest judges.

The episode originally aired on May 24, 2018.

On the main stage, RuPaul recreates Vanessa Vanjie Mateo's exit from the season's first episode ("10s Across the Board").

== Reception ==
In their review, Bowen Yang and Matt Rogers of Vulture rated the episode three out of five stars. Sam Damshenas of Gay Times called the lip-sync "killer".

Jessica Jalali included Miz Cracker and Miz Cookie in Screen Rant's 2021 list of the show's ten best makeover challenge "transformations" and wrote: "A complete transformation, Miz Cracker delivered a striking drag family resemblance that anyone could deduce that the two were drag family. On top of the irrefutable cohesiveness of the looks, Miz Cracker also helped craft a drag persona for Miz Cookie as the drag newcomer seemed at home on the runway.". The website's Min Ji Park included Heizer in a 2022 list of the show's "ten worst judges, according to Reddit" and wrote, "Miles Heizer was innocent enough in his guest judge appearance on Drag Race but unfortunately didn’t contribute much during that appearance... Fans found that he was too quiet and didn't speak up enough during the episode. Being memorable on an episode of the show is hard enough without being co-judges with Lizzo, but Heizer simply did not make any mark on the show during his appearance, and went down as one of the worst celebrity guest judges in the show's history."
