= Ed Hooper (journalist) =

American journalist

- Born: William Edward Hooper; March 10, 1964 (age 62); MacDill AFB Tampa, Florida
- Occupations: Author, journalist
- Notable credit(s): 1. Columnist; 2. Author; 3. Creator of Voices from the Front radio broadcast series.; 4. Military affairs reporter in war on terror.; 5.Chronicles notable veterans in U.S. history.: 6. Hosted radio/television documentary series on Tennessee history.; 7. Organized National Media campaign on needed repairs at Shiloh NMP.

William Edward (Ed) Hooper (born March 10, 1964) is an author, film producer and columnist from Knoxville, Tennessee. He is most widely known for his work in military affairs reporting and his coverage of historic preservation and U.S. veterans issues.

== Recognition ==
Hooper holds dozens of awards for his work as a broadcast and print journalist, including three of the U.S. military's highest civilian awards: The Department of Defense Medal for Distinguished Public Service presented on Aug. 15, 2001, The Department of Defense Seven Seals Public Service Award presented on June 12, 2004 and The U.S. Secretary of the Navy’s Meritorious Public Service Award presented on August 9, 2005. They were awarded for his work documenting notable veterans in U.S. history, his efforts decorating the graves of the Tennessee’s Medal of Honor recipients across the nation and for his ongoing work as a military affairs reporter in the war on terror, where he also served as an embedded reporter with the U.S. Army’s 489th Civil Affairs Battalion while working as a news reporter for WIVK-FM and contributing as a freelance writer for the Knoxville News Sentinel and other soldiers' hometown newspapers, who served in the unit.

One of Hooper's broadcast credits also cited in the awards was his creating and producing WIVK's twice-weekly broadcast series Voices from the Front with long-time colleague and WIVK afternoon announcer Ted Gunner Ousley, which gave soldiers and sailors from Tennessee the opportunity to speak with family members and listeners. The series was awarded numerous times for its public service contributions and led other stations across the nation to copy the program for their listeners.

In 1998, Hooper was nominated for the Pulitzer Prize in feature reporting for the Tennessee Star Journal series Appalachia: Behind the Spinning Wheel featuring minority accomplishments in Southern Appalachia and again in 2001 for Above and Beyond the Call of Duty, a series of stories on the American Southeast's Medal of Honor recipients. He has been twice awarded the prestigious Golden Press Card Award for Excellence in Journalism from the East Tennessee Society of Professional Journalists; first in 2002 for Historic Preservation finds Common Ground and again in 2009 for his book Knoxville in the Vietnam Era.

== Career milestones ==
Ed Hooper's first nationally published article was as a columnist for Banjo Newsletter when he was 17 years old. His first syndicated broadcast series was Radio Appalachia, 1986–1992, which aired on more than 30 stations in the Southern Appalachian region. The daily program covered the history and culture of Southern Appalachia and was noted for dispelling media stereotypes of the region that pervade popular culture. His work with the program was also noted for its original documentation of minorities in Southern Appalachian history.

His first national story as a news reporter was his coverage of the 1994 Watts Bar Nuclear Generating Station protest by the radical environmental group Earth First for WVLT-TV in Knoxville, which resulted in numerous arrests, police actions and national media coverage. He was the only broadcast reporter to arrive at the site before protesters set up a transportation blockade on highways and roads leading to the power station. In addition to news reporting and anchoring a weekly public affairs talk show for the station, Hooper created and produced a television documentary series on Tennessee history and archaeology in 1995. The twice-weekly broadcast was carried by CBS affiliates statewide and earned regional and statewide recognition for its documentaries on Tennessee's past.

In 1996, Hooper coordinated a successful national media campaign to bring attention to the plight of Shiloh National Military Park's erosion issues and the destruction of a Mississippian Indian mound on the Shiloh Indian Mounds Site, which sat on the back of the National Park Service's Shiloh property. The ensuing efforts led him and broadcast producer Jeff Hentschel to create the Tennessee Online Internet site, which serves as a teaching aid for students studying the history of Tennessee. In addition, Hooper served as a trustee and as Museum Outreach Chairman of the National Medal of Honor Museum of Military History from 1996 to 2002, where he assisted in researching and assisting with the displays of MOH "Halls of Valor" across the nation and at U.S. military facilities overseas. He has coordinated numerous educational programs with the nation's living recipients for public and private schools.

In 2002, the Tennessee Legislature unanimously passed Senate Joint Resolution 0537 officially giving Hooper the ancient title of “Bard Laureate” of Tennessee for his efforts documenting Tennessee’s notable veterans. In 2005 and 2006, Hooper served two successive terms as President of the East Tennessee Society of Professional Journalists.

Hooper served as a publisher/editor of the Civil War Courier newspaper and national reenacting magazines Camp Chase Gazette, and the Citizen's Companion from 2004 to 2009. During his tenure, he served as national media coordinator for the 140th Battle of Franklin and the 145th Battle of Chickamauga. He also coordinated The Battle of Chickamauga's School Days program and the Medal of Honor program for more than 7,000 school children. He was the event manager for the opening ceremony's keynote speaking event featuring the Vice President of the United States.

His extensive work with American Indian tribes helping document their military veterans and Medal of Honor recipients has been cited numerous times for its preservation of tribal contributions to the U.S. military. His research has also assisted state and federal officials in drafting legislation and resolutions honoring notable veterans in American history. In 2010, Hooper was recognized on the floor of the U.S. House of Representatives for his efforts originating and assisting in the drafting of the bipartisan HR 1442 that was passed by Congress designating November as U.S. Military History Month. It calls on state legislatures and assemblies to designate November as United States Military History Month and encourages citizens to study the subject and participate in Veterans Day activities.

He is the author of six books. His 2008 release Knoxville in the Vietnam Era and Knoxville's WIVK are additions to his photographic histories and features never-before-seen photographs of Knoxville and Tennessee. His 2009 book release Knoxville's WNOX traces the origins of the celebrated broadcast station WNOX from its launching of Country music as an American music genre to its formative impact on Rock and roll in popular music. He has also worked as a columnist for the Washington Post, the History News Service and the Atlanta Journal Constitution.

In 2013, Hooper served on the host committee of the 2014 Medal of Honor Convention, where he worked with RIVR Media producing and writing the critically acclaimed "Medal of Honor: The History" narrated by Gary Sinise for the Congressional Medal of Honor Society. It was the first chronological history of the U.S. Military's highest award featuring artifacts and documents from private and public collections around the world on the decoration. It was the legacy contribution of the Knoxville Medal of Honor Convention. The documentary premiered to recipients at the United States Supreme Court and was featured on The Pentagon Channel. Hooper followed up the documentary with "The Tennesseans: A Volunteer Legacy" featuring the military history of the state of Tennessee that earned it the "Volunteer" nickname, including images and documents on notable minorities and women that had been overlooked in the state's military legacy. It premiered July 4, 2015, on Tennessee's Public Broadcasting System.

Hooper works as an independent documentary producer in Tennessee and is a frequent speaker on veterans' issues, the American Southeast and Southern Appalachian culture.

== Bibliography ==
- Images of America: Knoxville (Arcadia Publishing 2003) ISBN 0-7385-1557-4
- Gunpowder and Glory: Tennessee’s Wild West Legends (PA 2005) ISBN 1-4137-7798-8
- Knoxville in World War II (Arcadia Publishing 2006) ISBN 0-7385-4320-9
- Knoxville in the Vietnam Era (Arcadia Publishing 2008) ISBN 0-7385-5341-7
- Knoxville's WIVK (Arcadia Publishing 2008) ISBN 978-0-7385-6703-7
- Knoxville's WNOX (Arcadia Publishing 2009) ISBN 978-0-7385-6653-5
