= Where Are We? Our Trip Through America =

1992 American documentary film

- Directed by: Rob Epstein; Jeffrey Friedman
- Produced by: Rob Epstein; Jeffrey Friedman; Sharon Wood (Associate Producer)
- Cinematography: Jean de Segonzac
- Edited by: Ned Bastille
- Music by: Daniel Licht
- Production company: Telling Pictures
- Distributed by: Roxie Releasing
- Release date: January 21, 1992
- Running time: 73 minutes
- Country: United States
- Language: English

Where Are We? Our Trip Through America is a 1992 American documentary film directed by Rob Epstein and Jeffrey Friedman.

== Overview ==
In May 1991, San Francisco filmmakers Jeffrey Friedman and Rob Epstein took an 18-day road trip through areas in the south and southwest of the United States, interviewing various people about their lives and their feelings about the country.

== Production ==
In an interview with James Kleinmann, Jeffrey Friedman explained, "Where Are We? Was something we came up with as a response to a request for proposals from the Corporation for Public Broadcasting. The theme was rediscovering America, and we came up with the idea of doing a road trip through the country, meeting people from backgrounds different from ours. We were both gay men who came from the East Coast and lived on the West Coast, and we knew that there was this big country in the middle whose lives we were not that familiar with, and who we felt had experiences which were socially and culturally different from ours. We thought it would be interesting to take a trip through this unknown land, unknown to us anyway, to discover what the differences really were and what we had in common."

The book The Art of Nonfiction Movie Making by Jeffrey Friedman, Robert Epstein, and Sharon Wood contains extensive information about the conception and production of the documentary as well as other documentaries by the filmmakers. The book states that the documentary, originally called Planes, Trains, and Buses, was conceived as a trip across country using three modes of transportation and was meant to focus on class structure in the United States. The filmmakers made contact with transportation companies and got written permission from Greyhound to film on their buses and from Amtrak to shoot on the train. For the plane, the filmmakers chose MGM Grand Air, a short-lived first-class-only airline that flew exclusively between New York and Los Angeles, which they felt this would heighten the contrast in the economic circumstances of the subjects of the film. When it came time to start filming, the airline's PR department withdrew its permission. The filmmakers decided to drive across country, supplemented with a day each on a Greyhound bus and an Amtrak train.

== Release ==
Special features on the Blu-ray release include deleted scenes and optional audio commentary.

== Reception ==
Reviewer Christopher Campbell of Medium gave the film a rating of four stars, writing, "It's a surprisingly different effort from the duo, partly because it’s not a tearjerker and partly because it's done in the first-person style as the two narrate their travels westward through the American South and talk to random people and address the climate on gay culture and tolerance in the early '90s. It's interesting for being made just after the Gulf War and before the 'don't ask, don't tell' policy as it features a number of homosexuals in the military, some of whom come out publicly on screen. The film is probably even better now for its historical anthropology than it was 20 years ago, but either way it's a fascinating road movie."

Reviewer Bil Antoniou of The Shelf wrote, "You get the kind of caricature of what we now think of as Trump's America from a few people (like the gentleman in the barbershop who is mad at the liberal reporters who want to take away his guns) but even he is as generous and welcoming as many of the optimistic individuals who are happy to share their stories and who react positively to the directors. Epstein and Friedman never patronize or provoke their subjects, they seem to genuinely want to know how people feel about life in their country even in cases where they are interviewing people diametrically opposed to them, and the result is something that makes one wistful for the days before we all believed that there was more success to be gleaned from picking fights. The documentary is inconclusive and deeply felt."

James Kleinmann wrote, "Epstein and Friedman's 1992 documentary Where Are We? Our Trip Through America, saw the filmmakers take a road trip through an America unknown to them, seeking to find some common ground with those they encountered at a time of sharp divisions in the country over LGBTQ issues and the Gulf War."

TV Guide gave the film a rating of three stars.
