= Making Love =

1982 film by Arthur Hiller

- Theatrical release poster
- Directed by: Arthur Hiller
- Screenplay by: Barry Sandler
- Story by: A. Scott Berg
- Produced by: Allen R. Adler; Daniel Melnick
- Starring: Michael Ontkean; Kate Jackson; Harry Hamlin; Wendy Hiller; Arthur Hill
- Cinematography: David M. Walsh
- Edited by: William H. Reynolds
- Music by: Leonard Rosenman
- Distributed by: 20th Century Fox
- Release date: February 12, 1982
- Running time: 113 minutes
- Country: United States
- Language: English
- Budget: $14 million
- Box office: $11,897,978

Making Love is a 1982 American drama film directed by Arthur Hiller and starring Kate Jackson, Harry Hamlin and Michael Ontkean. The film tells the story of a married man coming to terms with his homosexuality and the love triangle that develops between him, his wife and another man.

== Plot ==
Zack Elliot is a successful young oncologist in the Los Angeles area married to Claire, an equally successful television network executive during the early 1980s. They first met in college, have been married for eight years, and are generally happy in their relationship, sharing a love for Gilbert and Sullivan and the poetry of Rupert Brooke, to whom they were introduced by their elderly former neighbor, Winnie Bates. Intending to start a family, the couple buys a big house.

Unknown to Claire, Zack has been struggling with feelings of attraction to other men. He picks up men in his car and starts frequenting gay bars in West Hollywood on his lunch hour, although he does not follow through sexually. This changes when he meets Bart McGuire, an openly gay novelist who comes to see him for a medical check-up. Bart leads a fairly hedonistic single lifestyle, picking up multiple sexual partners, frequenting gay bars and clubs, and occasionally taking recreational drugs. Zack and Bart are mutually but unspokenly attracted to each other and go out for lunch.

A few days later, Zack asks him on a dinner date. He lies to Claire, saying he has to work late. At Bart's house, it becomes clear Zack is not yet able to identify as gay, instead labeling himself "curious." Zack and Bart go to bed, which is the first time Zack has had sex with another man. Zack wants to stay the night, but Bart, following his usual pattern, brushes him off. Angered, Zack leaves, but later challenges Bart's fear of intimacy, which stems from his own troubled childhood with his domineering and emotionally abusive father growing up. Bart makes plans for them to get together during the weekend.

Claire, concerned about the growing distance in her marriage, goes to her boss seeking a year-long leave of absence. Instead, he promotes her and sends her to New York City on a weekend business trip. Zack takes advantage of the opportunity to spend more time with Bart, but they end up arguing. Zack calls the outline for Bart's new novel less than honest, and Bart confronts Zack about his own lack of honesty about his sexuality. That night in bed, Zack tells Bart that he loves him. The next morning, fearful of his own growing feelings for Zack, Bart pushes him away again.

Eventually, Bart realizes he has feelings for Zack but isn't ready for the commitment Zack needs. He is last seen in the film at the bars, cruising.

When Claire returns from her trip, Zack confesses his feelings for other men. Although she said she could handle anything, she reacts badly, and Zack leaves. A few days later, Claire, emotional, trashes some of Zack's clothes and finds a matchbook with a man's name and number. She locates someone Zack had met and they talk. She learns he lives a relatively normal and happy life. Claire tries to convince Zack to stay in the marriage, even accepting him having affairs with other men. However, Zack tells her she must let go, as he can no longer live a lie and needs to be true to himself. He then informs Claire of a job prospect in New York City, working with cancer patients. Ultimately, they agree to a divorce.

The film ends a few years in the future, with the death of Winnie Bates, Zack and Claire's former neighbor. Zack is living in New York and in a committed relationship with another man, an investment banker, named Ken. He returns to Los Angeles for Winnie's funeral. Claire has since gotten remarried to an architect, and has a young son named Rupert. It is loosely implied that she is now a stay-at-home mom. After the funeral, Zack and Claire discuss their lives and express their own happiness and their gratitude that the other is happy.

Throughout the film, Bart and Claire deliver several mini-monologues, speaking directly to the camera about aspects of their lives and their feelings about the scenes that had just played out on-screen.

== Cast ==
- Michael Ontkean as Zack Elliot
- Harry Hamlin as Bart McGuire
- Kate Jackson as Claire Elliot
- Wendy Hiller as Winnie Bates
- Arthur Hill as Henry
- Nancy Olson as Christine

== Background ==
The core concept for Making Love purportedly occurred to writer Scott Berg while he was touring to promote his 1978 biography Max Perkins: Editor of Genius: the tour occasioned Berg's touching base with several male friends from his college days who confided that they were opting out of marriages for same-sex relationships. Berg said, "I thought this is the next big social movement of our country. What the black [rights] movement was, translated into film in the '60s, what the feminist movement was in the '70s, the gay movement will be in the '80s." Berg pitched a story based on his college friends' disclosures to his friend screenwriter Barry Sandler who like Berg was openly gay. Sandler said, "I resisted [scripting Berg's story] at first" - six months passed before Sandler agreed to collaborate with Berg - "I [had] always written very glossy, Hollywood type of films"..."[Berg's story was] very delicate and potentially explosive...To do this film meant a great deal of self-exploration into portions of my psyche I hadn't been into before." Despite Berg's avowed purpose in "translating" the "gay movement of the '80s" into film, the planned focus of the screenplay for Making Love was as a "husband-and-wife love story." Berg said, "It was very important to have a love story [to interest] a major studio". Sherry Lansing, newly appointed president of 20th Century-Fox, greenlit the project based on an outline of Sandler's projected screenplay, of which a 125-page rough draft was completed in the autumn of 1980 when directing duties were assigned to Arthur Hiller, whose helming of the iconic 1970 film Love Story would be heavily referenced in the promotion for Making Love, the latter film being posited as the "'Love Story' of the '80s".

Daniel Melnick, the co-producer of Making Love, would allege that the film's two male leads, Michael Ontkean and Harry Hamlin, as well as female lead Kate Jackson, were the "original choices" for their roles, while admitting, "We did send the script to a few actors who [responded] that they were either not interested or were 'too busy'". Reportedly the film-makers hoped to cast Michael Douglas as Zack to the point that after he passed on the film's original script he was sent a revision which he also passed on. Another actor courted to play Zack: Tom Berenger, purportedly passed on the part due to a scheduling conflict (Berenger did tour Japan in A Streetcar Named Desire in the spring of 1981). Harrison Ford, William Hurt and Peter Strauss have also been cited as being unsuccessfully approached to play Zack. According to Arthur Hiller, most actors he approached re starring in Making Love advised him not to even consider them. Kate Jackson - who had previously costarred with Ontkean in the 1972-76 ABC-TV series The Rookies - was cast by Hiller as the female lead in Making Love on the strength of her performance in the TV movie Thin Ice which was previewed for Hiller prior to its 17 February 1981 broadcast.

== Themes ==
Making Love was one of several mainstream Hollywood films to be released in 1982 that attempted to deal with themes of homosexuality in a more tolerant and sympathetic light. Others included Personal Best, Victor/Victoria, and Partners. Making Love has been referred to as being the first mainstream Hollywood film drama to address the subject of coming out and the effect that being closeted and coming out has on a marriage.

The film contrasts two visions of the so-called "gay lifestyle". Zack wants to settle into a long-term monogamous relationship, while Bart is shown as promiscuous and uninterested in forming commitments.

Issues of the tension many women felt over pursuing careers are also touched on in Claire's fears that she is being forced to choose between her career and having a baby. By the film's end, she does have a child, but it is unstated whether she is still working, so that issue ultimately remains unresolved (although it is implied she's now a housewife).

== Release and public reception ==
Principal photography for Making Love commenced in February 1981 being completed that May auguring the film would be a high-profile summer release: however Making Love would not be released for almost a year, a key factor in this delay reportedly being the negative reaction of Marvin Davis, the Denver oil tycoon who purchased 20th Century-Fox in April 1981 ("At a private screening of the gay love story Making Love, he reportedly stands up and bellows, “You made a goddamn faggot movie!,” and storms out of the room"). Making Love would open during the "dump months" of 1982, but 20th Century-Fox hoped to boost the film to hit status, having devised a "three-pronged" advertising campaign costing $5 million - more than half the $8 million cost of making the film: besides being promoted as a "sympathetic view of...'coming out'" to draw gay audiences, Making Love was pitched to the "mainstream audience" as a "'women's film' - Hollywood marketese for 'soap opera'" - and also as a purported cinematic milestone, the latter a tactic to draw "educated young adult males".

Opening 12 February 1982, Making Love was originally hailed as a hit, earning an inaugural four-day box office tally of $3 million and swiftly expanding its theatre count from 300 venues to 700. However the strong opening of Making Love evidently exhausted any potential public interest in the film which would soon prove a costly flop: with a total cost between $13–14 million - including distribution costs and the $5 million advertising campaigns - Making Love's total domestic box office tally would be reported as $6.1 million. Reports of Sherry Lansing's 20 December 1982 resigning as 20th Century-Fox president noted: "The company has produced bomb after bomb under Lansing, including Author! Author!, Monsignor and Making Love" and that 20th Century-Fox would end 1982 with a loss of $16.9 million. The studio wouldn't recoup their losses until the release of Return of the Jedi in the summer of 1983.

== Critical reaction ==
Upon its release, Making Love was typically dismissed by critics as a glossy soap opera which dodged its sensitive ostensibly core issue.

Gay film historian Vito Russo wrote in The Celluloid Closet that straight critics found the film boring while gay critics, glad for any attention paid to the subject, praised it. Making Love opened strong at the box office its first week, but poor word of mouth led to a large drop-off in box office receipts the following week.

Gay rights activist Dennis Altman argued in The Homosexualization of America (1982) that, of several films released in the United States in 1982 that dealt with homosexual themes, Making Love was the only one that "suggested a willingness to portray homosexual relations as equally valid as heterosexual ones" and that "the wariness with which the film was promoted suggests real change will be slow."

Social critic Camille Paglia in 2006 cited Making Love, which she considers "intelligent", as her "favorite film to date about gay men."

Rotten Tomatoes gives the film a rating of 56% from 25 reviews.

== Home media ==
Making Love was released by 20th Century Fox Home Entertainment on Region 1 DVD on February 7, 2006.

== Awards and nominations ==
The film's theme song, "Making Love" performed by Roberta Flack, garnered composers – Burt Bacharach (lyrics), Bruce Roberts (lyrics/music), and Carole Bayer Sager (lyrics) – a nomination for a Golden Globe Award for Best Original Song.
