= The Duchess and the Dirtwater Fox =

1976 film by Melvin Frank

- Theatrical release poster
- Directed by: Melvin Frank
- Screenplay by: Melvin Frank; Barry Sandler; Jack Rose
- Story by: Barry Sandler
- Produced by: Melvin Frank
- Starring: George Segal; Goldie Hawn
- Cinematography: Joseph Biroc
- Edited by: Frank Bracht; Bill Butler
- Music by: Charles Fox
- Production company: 20th Century-Fox
- Distributed by: 20th Century-Fox
- Release date: March 24, 1976
- Running time: 103 minutes
- Country: United States
- Language: English
- Budget: $4.5 million
- Box office: $15.1 million

The Duchess and the Dirtwater Fox is a 1976 American Western romantic comedy film directed and produced by Melvin Frank from a screenplay by Frank, Barry Sandler, and Jack Rose and a story by Sandler. It stars George Segal and Goldie Hawn as the title characters. It follows a female hustler who becomes repeatedly mixed up with a suave con man and card sharp through a series of misadventures before falling in love with him.

The film was theatrically released in the United States on March 24, 1976, by 20th Century-Fox. It received mediocre reviews from critics, but performed well at the box office. For her performance, Hawn was nominated for the Golden Globe Award for Best Actress in a Motion Picture – Comedy or Musical.

== Plot ==
In 1882, San Francisco, popular dance hall girl Amanda Quaid learns that Mormon millionaire Josiah Widdicombe is seeking a well-bred governess for his children. Looking for an easier life, Amanda needs $65 to buy clothes for the interview. She accepts an invitation from gambler Charlie "Dirtwater Fox" Malloy to join him in his hotel room, where she discovers he is carrying a satchel full of stolen money that he acquired by double-crossing the Bloodworth gang in a bank robbery. Drugging Charlie and stealing the satchel, she buys an outfit and successfully interviews with Widdicombe as the "Duchess of Swansbury".

When Charlie notices that the money is gone, he travels east on his horse Blackjack and catches up to the stagecoach carrying Amanda to Salt Lake City, Utah. Charlie recognizes Amanda and makes her agree to give him a portion of her salary in exchange for keeping her real identity a secret. On their trip, they encounter snakes, rapids, horseback pursuits through towns, a Jewish wedding, and the Bloodworth gang who capture them and take back the money. The pair are tied down with stakes and left to die, but manage to escape when Amanda uses a pair of lorgnette spectacles to burn through the ropes.

The couple almost make it to Salt Lake City, but Charlie is not willing to give up the money and hatches a plan to get it back from the Bloodworth gang. He sets booby traps at the gang's ranch and starts a fire in the barn, retrieving the loot in the process. In the ensuing chase and gunfight, the gang members are killed, but Charlie is wounded. Charlie believes he is dying, but Amanda calls him lazy, grabs the satchel and walks toward Salt Lake City. Charlie and Blackjack stand up and follow her.

== Cast ==
- George Segal as Charlie "Dirtwater Fox" Malloy
- Goldie Hawn as Amanda "Duchess" Quaid
- Conrad Janis as Gladstone
- Thayer David as Josiah Widdicombe
- Jennifer Lee as Trollop
- Sid Gould as Rabbi
- Pat Ast as Music hall singer
- E. J. André as Prospector
- Dick Farnsworth as Stagecoach driver
- Clifford Turknett as Mr. Weatherly
- Roy Jenson as Bloodworth
- Bob Hoy as Ingersoll, Bloodworth gang member
- Bennie Dobbins as Murphy, Bloodworth gang member
- Walter Scott as Graves, Bloodworth gang member
- Jerry Gatlin as Stein, Bloodworth gang member

== Production ==
On June 20, 1975, it was announced that Melvin Frank had been hired by Twentieth Century-Fox Film Corporation to produce and direct The Duchess and the Dirtwater Fox. The studio considered the film to be one of its major productions for 1975.

Principal photography took place in Colorado from August 18 to October 16, 1975. The film was shot in and around Central City, Cañon City, Denver, and Westcliffe, Colorado.

== Reception ==
=== Critical response ===
On the review aggregator website Rotten Tomatoes, 50% of 8 critics' reviews are positive, with an average rating of 4.0/10.

Richard Eder of The New York Times wrote that "the gags make for monotony. Here the action—there is lots of it—has been polluted for the sake of gags that are rarely even funny in themselves." The Chicago Tribune's Gene Siskel gave the film two stars out of four and noted it was indebted to the comedy of Mel Brooks and Blazing Saddles in particular, but only had one funny scene (in which Segal and Hawn converse in a mixture of different languages). Arthur D. Murphy of Variety wrote, "While the 104-minute film is more than simply an acceptable effort, it lacks the punch, dash and excitement which makes a film comedy really great." Charles Champlin of the Los Angeles Times called it "a vigorous little diversion, fast, efficient and peppered if not replete with inventive jokes ... Mostly the movie has Segal and Hawn, who are both shrewd and attractive light comedians." Caroline Lewis of The Monthly Film Bulletin wrote that "except when they are scoring points off the more obvious clichés, the visual and verbal puns seem rather unsure of their targets, and the film fails to sustain the pace set by a few hilarious scenes."

=== Accolades ===
Year	Award	Category	Nominee	Result	Ref.
1977	34th Golden Globe Awards	Best Actress in a Motion Picture – Comedy or Musical	Goldie Hawn	Nominated	
