= State of Pride =

2019 American documentary film

- Film poster
- Directed by: Rob Epstein; Jeffrey Friedman
- Produced by: Rob Epstein; Jeffrey Friedman; Mari Rivera
- Starring: Troye Sivan; Raymond Braun; Heklina
- Cinematography: Lincoln Else; Zachary Fink
- Edited by: Michael Palmieri
- Music by: Allyson Newman; Matt Novack
- Production company: Portal A Interactive
- Distributed by: YouTube
- Release date: March 8, 2019 (SXSW)
- Running time: 70 minutes
- Country: United States
- Language: English

State of Pride is a 2019 American YouTube original documentary film directed by Jeffrey Friedman and Rob Epstein. YouTuber and LGBTQ activist Raymond Braun explores the LGBT rights movement by traveling to Salt Lake City, Utah, San Francisco, California, and Tuscaloosa, Alabama, to meet with young LGBT people who share their opinions about what Pride Month means to them. The film stars Troye Sivan, Raymond Braun and Heklina. It was the first in a series of three documentaries hosted on the YouTube site for Pride 2019. It had its world premiere on March 8, 2019, at the South by Southwest Film Festival, and later released on YouTube on May 29, 2019.

== Synopsis ==
LGBT activist Raymond Braun examines the LGBT rights movement by touring the country with stops in Utah, California, Alabama and Washington D.C., where he meets with young LGBT people who share their experiences and opinions about what Pride Month means to them. Notable highlights include interviews with trans women of color in Alabama, a young trans woman attending her first Pride event in San Francisco, where he also interviews American actor and drag queen, Heklina. In Utah, he talks with a young gay disabled man who shares his experiences about his Mormon family accepting his sexual orientation, and also talks about how people in the LGBT community with disabilities are often de-sexualized. And in D.C. Braun talks with Australian singer and activist Troye Sivan.

People have been doing this a long time. We owe it to our elders that we get to be here today.

— Troye Sivan

== Cast ==
- Troye Sivan
- Raymond Braun
- Heklina

== Production notes ==
Braun said that it was in 2017 when the project first began to develop after meeting with executives from Portal A Interactive. After being asked what a dream project would look like to him, Braun pitched the idea of touring the country to meet with young LGBT people who would share their experiences and opinions about what Pride Month meant to them. As soon as the project was greenlit, he brought on Rob Epstein and Jeff Friedman, two experienced filmmakers who had a successful history of making LGBT films. Braun also said that producer Mari Rivera hired an all-female crew who in turn made sure to hire a team that represented the diversity of the LGBT community.

== Critical reception ==
Christopher Cappiello wrote in the Los Angeles Blade that Epsteins and Friedmans directing was impressive, and the film is "illuminating even as it entertains". Cappiello also noted that the film gives due consideration to the history of the LGBT movement, "and the importance of recognizing how far we’ve come since Stonewall fifty years ago". Richard Schneider wrote that for old-timers who have attended these Pride parades and events for years and years, these "declarations of 'Pride' can seem a little hokey", but we shouldn't dispute their sincerity and honesty. He also said the film "reminds us that the adoption of this word [Pride] is the opposite of shame and homophobia".

== See also ==
- Gay pride
- LGBT history
- List of LGBT events
- Pride parade
