= Linda Ronstadt: The Sound of My Voice =

2019 documentary film

- Movie poster
- Directed by: Rob Epstein; Jeffrey Friedman
- Produced by: James Keach; Michele Farinola
- Starring: Linda Ronstadt
- Distributed by: Greenwich Entertainment
- Release dates: April 26, 2019 (Tribeca Film Festival); September 6, 2019 (United States)
- Running time: 95 minutes
- Country: United States
- Language: English
- Box office: $4,252,657

Linda Ronstadt: The Sound of My Voice is a 2019 documentary film about American singer Linda Ronstadt. It was directed by Rob Epstein and Jeffrey Friedman. It features interviews with many of Ronstadt's friends and fellow artists.

It had its world premiere at Tribeca Film Festival on April 26, 2019. It won the Audience Award for Best Documentary at the 2019 Provincetown International Film Festival.

Greenwich Entertainment, 1091 and CNN Films released Linda Ronstadt: The Sound of My Voice in theaters in September 2019. It was released on Digital HD from Amazon Video and iTunes on December 3, 2019, and on DVD and Blu-ray on December 10, 2019. Its broadcast premiere was on the CNN network on January 1, 2020.

It won Best Music Film at the 63rd Annual Grammy Awards, Ronstadt's first competitive nomination since 2006.

== Synopsis ==
Linda Ronstadt: The Sound of My Voice covers Ronstadt's life and career from childhood to the present day. Narrated by the singer (who otherwise appears on camera only briefly in present-day footage), she describes how she grew up in Tucson, Arizona, singing Mexican canciones with her family; her folk-rock days with her first professional group, the Stone Poneys, in the late 1960s; living in Santa Monica, California; and her early days performing at the popular West Hollywood night club, the Troubadour.

Other topics covered by the film include her rise as the "queen of country rock" in the 1970s; her advocacy for women in the male-dominated music industry; her high-profile romance with California Governor Jerry Brown; and her unexpected move away from country-rock into diverse areas such as opera, the Great American Songbook, and several albums devoted to the music of her Mexican heritage.

The documentary reaches to the present day and how the onset of what was initially thought to be Parkinson's disease left her unable to sing and forced her into early retirement in 2009.

The film is illustrated with concert footage from throughout Ronstadt's career, and interviews with many of her collaborators, friends, and family members.

== Cast ==
The following musicians or others involved in Ronstadt's life and career are named and seen onscreen in an interview setting, usually for small amounts of screen time.

- Linda Ronstadt
- Peter Asher
- Karla Bonoff
- John Boylan
- Jackson Browne
- Patricia Casado of Lucy's El Adobe restaurant
- Ry Cooder
- Cameron Crowe
- David Geffen
- Emmylou Harris
- Don Henley
- Bobby Kimmel
- Kevin Kline
- Aaron Neville
- Dolly Parton
- Bonnie Raitt
- Petie Ronstadt
- Joe Smith, record executive for Elektra/Asylum
- JD Souther
- Waddy Wachtel

In addition, The Muppets, Kate and Anna McGarrigle, Nelson Riddle, Johnny Cash, Glen Campbell, Don Lane, Glenn Frey, Johnny Carson, Rubén Blades and Ringo Starr appear in archival footage. Archive photo of Red & The Red Hots with Linda Ronstadt, Red Young, Elizabeth Lammers, Liza Likins, Rita Valente with Nelson Riddle from Radio City Music Hall. There is a musical performance at The Rock And Roll Hall of Fame Induction with Carrie Underwood, Bonnie Raitt, Sheryl Crow, Emmylou Harris, and Stevie Nicks.

== Reception ==
On the review aggregator Rotten Tomatoes, the film holds an approval rating of 89% based on 94 reviews. The site's critical consensus reads, "Linda Ronstadt: The Sound of My Voice offers an engaging overview of its subject's career that should entertain fans and the uninitiated alike." Metacritic, which uses a weighted average, assigned the film a score of 77 out of 100, indicating "generally favorable" reviews.

Frank Scheck of The Hollywood Reporter wrote that the film "will make you fall in love with [Linda] all over again" and that it "will delight the singer's old fans and likely make her many new ones as well". Pete Hammond of Deadline wrote that it "expertly captures why Ronstadt was such a unique performer — a voice that could lend itself to any form of music she tried" and that the "performance footage that will knock your socks off and likely sell millions more albums from her vast catalog". Owen Gleiberman of Variety wrote, "Ronstadt's voice yearns and crests with a freedom that never forgets its pain. She breaks your heart and heals it at the same time."

=== Accolades ===
Year	Award	Category	Nominee	Result	Ref.
2019	Critics' Choice Documentary Awards	Best Music Documentary	Linda Ronstadt: The Sound of My Voice	Won	
2019	Critics' Choice Documentary Awards	Most Compelling Living Subject of a Documentary	Linda Ronstadt	Won	
2019	Critics' Choice Documentary Awards	Best Biographical Documentary	Linda Ronstadt: The Sound of My Voice	Nominated	
2019	Provincetown International Film Festival	Best Documentary Feature - Audience Award	Rob Epstein, Jeffrey Friedman	Won	
2019	Film Club's The Lost Weekend Awards	Best Soundtrack	Rob Epstein, Jeffrey Friedman	Won	
2019	St. Louis Film Critics Association Awards	Best Documentary Film	Linda Ronstadt: The Sound of My Voice	Nominated	
2020	AARP Movies for Grownups Awards	Best Documentary	Linda Ronstadt: The Sound of My Voice	Won	
2020	News & Documentary Emmy Awards	Outstanding Arts and Culture Documentary	Michele Farinola (producer), Rob Epstein (director), James Keach (producer), Jeffrey Friedman (director)	Nominated	
2020	American Cinema Editors Eddie Awards	Best Edited Documentary - Feature	Jake Pushinsky, Heidi Scharfe	Nominated	
2020	MPSE Golden Reel Awards	Outstanding Achievement in Sound Editing - Sound Effects, Foley, Dialogue and ADR for Documentary Feature Film	Milos Zivkovic (supervising sound editor), John Boylan (supervising music editor), Julian Raymond (supervising music editor), Bennett Salvay (supervising music editor)	Nominated	
2020	Hawaii Film Critics Society Awards	Best Documentary	Linda Ronstadt: The Sound of My Voice	Nominated	
2021	Grammy Awards	Best Music Film	Linda Ronstadt (artist), Rob Epstein (video director), Jeffrey Friedman (video director), Michele Farinola (video producer), James Keach (video producer)	Won	
