= The Celluloid Closet (book) =

1981 book by Vito Russo

- First edition cover
- Author: Vito Russo
- Language: English
- Subject: History of homosexuality in film
- Publisher: Harper & Row
- Publication date: 1981
- Pages: 276
- ISBN: 0-06-013704-5

The Celluloid Closet: Homosexuality in the Movies is a non-fiction book by film historian and LGBT activist Vito Russo, first published in 1981 by Harper & Row. The book examines the history of depictions of homosexuality in film, particularly in Hollywood films, from queer coded to overt portrayals. A revised edition of the book was published in 1987, with 80 additional pages.

The book was released after two books of the same subject Parker Tyler's 1972 book Screening the Sexes and Richard Dyer's 1977 Gays and Film, even though Russo complained at the time of the release that no gay writer had produced any meaningful criticism of homosexuality in the movies.

The Celluloid Closet book was prefigured by a live lecture/film clip presentation of the same name, which Russo first presented in 1972 and would go on to deliver at colleges, universities, and small cinemas. After Russo's death in 1990, The Celluloid Closet book was adapted into a 1995 documentary film of the same name directed by Rob Epstein and Jeffrey Friedman.

== Reception ==
Demian of the Seattle Gay News wrote that, "Vito Russo brings to his book the same wealth of political and social history that he used in creating his lecture and film show", and concluded: "The Celluloid Closet is a great book to browse through. The writing is direct, clear, and entertaining. The book is another piece of history reclaimed. Vito Russo has created an exciting volume out his great love of cinema and out of his gay pride."

The New York Times described it as "an essential reference book" on the representation of homosexuality in the United States film industry.

The Kirkus Reviews critic wrote that, "from a serious and gay-rights-conscious perspective", the author "scrutinizes the representation of homosexuals in American films", ranging from the predominance of the "harmless sissy" image to characters considered "somewhat dangerous". In addition, the book addresses the subject during periods of censorship, which rendered the theme of homosexuality "implicitly present (as a threat) but not mentionable", as well as the representations that emerged after the "relaxation of the Motion Picture Code in 1961", continuing up to the present day (1981). The reviewer highlighted as positive points Russo's documentation and research throughout this cinematic process, and as a negative point "occasional lapses into strident rhetoric", referring to moments when Russo labels heterosexuals as "paranoid" or "homophobic" while arguing against traditional male/female gender roles or when identifying non-explicit sexual statements.

== See also ==
- History of homosexuality in American film
- Media portrayal of LGBT people
