= Gross Anatomy (film) =

1989 film by Thom Eberhardt

- Theatrical release poster
- Directed by: Thom Eberhardt
- Screenplay by: Ron Nyswaner; Mark Spragg
- Story by: Mark Spragg; Howard Rosenman; Alan Jay Glueckman; Stanley Isaacs
- Produced by: Debra Hill; Howard Rosenman
- Starring: Matthew Modine; Daphne Zuniga; Christine Lahti
- Cinematography: Steve Yaconelli
- Edited by: Bud S. Smith; M. Scott Smith
- Music by: David Newman
- Production companies: Touchstone Pictures; Silver Screen Partners IV; Sandollar Productions; Hill/Roseman
- Distributed by: Buena Vista Pictures Distribution
- Release date: October 20, 1989
- Running time: 109 min.
- Language: English
- Budget: $8.5 million
- Box office: $11,604,598

Gross Anatomy is a 1989 American medical comedy-drama film directed by Thom Eberhardt from a screenplay by Ron Nyswaner and Mark Spragg. The film stars Matthew Modine, Daphne Zuniga, and Christine Lahti.

Gross Anatomy was released in the United States by Touchstone Pictures on October 20, 1989.

== Plot ==
Joe Slovak is a brilliant freshman medical school student whose nonconformist approach to life is tested when he enrolls in gross anatomy, the toughest course in med school. His schoolfriends and lab partners include Kim, a pregnant woman; Miles, a buttoned-down blue-blood; Laurie, an overly ambitious student determined to make it; and David, an overanalyzer who is also his roommate.

Joe's freewheeling, independent style immediately causes problems in the classroom, beginning with his constantly arriving late to class and using a door marked as "Do not enter", all of which annoy the class instructor Dr. Banumbra. Joe's antics become more serious, and put him at odds with the demanding department head, Dr. Woodruff, after Joe jokes about a cadaver in a disrespectful manner, prompting Woodruff to remind him that the bodies in the gross anatomy course were real people who donated their bodies to science and deserve respect. After Joe allows his roommate David to glance at his answers on an examination, Woodruff questions whether her easygoing "class rebel" has what it takes to be a doctor.

Meanwhile, Joe falls in love with his lab partner Laurie, who won't let anything, especially romance, interfere with her plans. While Joe's never done anything by the book, he proves he does have what it takes to succeed — without changing his ways. However, Joe's ways and the ways of medicine come to a head twice, once when he discovers David has been taking amphetamines, which leads to his expulsion when he passes out in class and Joe reveals this to Dr. Woodruff. The other time is when Joe is ordered to do an extra credit assignment by Dr. Woodruff involving a complex diagnosis. Joe correctly diagnoses it as a serious, difficult-to-treat chronic illness and learns the patient is Dr. Woodruff herself.

Joe returns to class and his teammates help him get caught up with his studies. Kim goes into labor when the group is on the road, forcing them to deliver the baby in a truck stop. Joe takes the final exam, then is told that Dr. Woodruff died that morning. This renews Joe's dedication to learning medicine and he takes his studies and his future more seriously. He and Laurie successfully pass their first year of medical school and Kim vows to return. Although Miles ends up with lower grades than Laurie and Joe, he has also passed.

== Cast ==
- Matthew Modine as Joe Slovak
- Daphne Zuniga as Laurie Rorbach
- Christine Lahti as Dr. Rachel Woodruff
- Todd Field as David Schreiner
- John Scott Clough as Miles Reed
- Alice Carter as Kim McCauley
- Robert Desiderio as Dr. Banks
- Zakes Mokae as Dr. Banumbra
- Ryan Cash as Frankie Slovak
- Rutanya Alda as Mama Slovak
- Brandis Kemp as Aunt Rose

== Reception ==
Gross Anatomy was released domestically on October 20, 1989, earning $2,830,387 in 853 theaters during its opening weekend. After its theatrical run, the film brought in a total of $11,604,598 at the domestic box office.

Upon its initial release, the film received mixed to negative critical response. Roger Ebert of the Chicago Sun-Times gave the film a three-star review stating, "Most of the major events in the movie can be anticipated, but they are played with a genuine grace." Janet Maslin of The New York Times also gave the film a positive review, describing the film as "mostly funny and engaging." It holds a rating of 36% on Rotten Tomatoes based on 11 reviews.
