= Gable and Lombard =

1976 film by Sidney J. Furie

- Theatrical film poster
- Directed by: Sidney J. Furie
- Written by: Barry Sandler
- Produced by: Harry Korshak
- Starring: James Brolin; Jill Clayburgh; Allen Garfield; Red Buttons
- Cinematography: Jordan Cronenweth
- Edited by: Argyle Nelson, Jr.
- Music by: Michel Legrand
- Distributed by: Universal Pictures
- Release dates: February 11, 1976 (Los Angeles and New York City)
- Running time: 131 minutes
- Country: United States
- Language: English
- Budget: $4.5 million
- Box office: $5.8 million

Gable and Lombard is a 1976 American biographical film directed by Sidney J. Furie. The screenplay by Barry Sandler is based on the romance and consequent marriage of screen stars Clark Gable and Carole Lombard. The original music score was composed by Michel Legrand.

== Plot ==
Film stars Clark Gable and Carole Lombard meet at a Hollywood party, where rugged leading man Gable eschews evening wear and screwball comedian Lombard arrives in an ambulance that wrecks his car. After an argument, it is apparent the two clearly dislike each other, and intensely so, but as fate conspires to bring them together again and again, they begin to admire each other and fall in love.

The fly in the ointment is Gable's second wife Ria. Metro-Goldwyn-Mayer studio chief Louis B. Mayer fears any publicity about his affair with Lombard will jeopardize Gable's career, and since he is MGM's most valuable player, Mayer becomes protective of his star. Gable and Lombard fish, play practical jokes on each other, laugh, fight, and have fun making up. His wife finally grants him a divorce, and the two wed. The happily ever after ending is thwarted when Lombard is killed in a plane crash while promoting the purchase of defense bonds during World War II.

== Cast ==
- James Brolin as Clark Gable
- Jill Clayburgh as Carole Lombard
- Allen Garfield as Louis B. Mayer
- Red Buttons as Ivan Cooper
- Joanne Linville as Ria Gable
- Melanie Mayron as Dixie
- Alice Backes as Hedda Hopper
- Ross Elliot as Lombard's Director
- Morgan Brittany as Vivien Leigh
- Carol McGinnis as Noreen
- Noah Keen as A. Broderick
- Alan Dexter as Sheriff Ellis (credited as Alan D. Dexter)
- S. John Launer as The Judge
- William Bryant as Colonel (credited as Bill Bryant)
- John Lehne as Attorney Kramer
- Robert Karnes as Gable's Director
- Betsy Jones-Moreland as Party Guest
- Jodean Lawrence as Party Guest (credited as Jodean Russo)

== Production ==
Production design was done by Edward C. Carfagno and costume design was provided by Edith Head.

== Critical reception ==
On the review aggregator website Rotten Tomatoes, 0% of 5 critics' reviews are positive, with an average rating of 3.4/10. In his review in The New York Times, Vincent Canby called the film

a fan-magazine movie with the emotional zap of a long-lost Louella Parsons column ... As written by Barry Sandler and directed by Sidney J. Furie, Gable and Lombard recalls not Gone with the Wind, Honky Tonk, Twentieth Century, Nothing Sacred or To Be or Not to Be, but clichés culled from the worst movies of that period. The actors do not help ... Of the two, Miss Clayburgh comes off better. She appears to be creating a character whenever the fearfully bad screenplay allows it. Mr. Brolin does not act. He gives an impersonation of the sort that makes you wonder if he can also do James Cagney and Edward G. Robinson. Miss Clayburgh could be an interesting actress, but she's not a great one, nor is she a star, and there are always problems when small performers try to portray the kind of giant legends that Gable and Lombard were. Because both Gable and Lombard are still very much alive in their films on television and in repertory theaters, there is difficulty in responding to Mr. Brolin and Miss Clayburgh in any serious way. They are stand-ins.

Roger Ebert of the Chicago Sun-Times described the film as a "mushy, old-fashioned extravaganza" and added,

there are so many dumb practical jokes and would-be risque innuendoes that any concern for [Gable and Lombard's] real thoughts and feelings is lost. So we don't get a notion of their private lives, and we don't even remotely learn from this movie what made them great stars and personalities.

Gene Siskel of the Chicago Tribune named Gable and Lombard one of the worst films of 1976, stating in his year-end TV review that “in real life, you can get arrested for playing around with dead bodies. The same should be true for movie-makers who desecrate the memory of great, dead actors.” He also slammed the "overwhelming" audacity of the film:

Think about it: What the folks at Universal Pictures have done ranks somewhere between putting Lenin's waxen body in the Kremlin and Disneyland notorizing the Presidents.

[...]

IT'S PURE cornball, filled with every cliche. James Brolin looks and sounds like Gable from his "Gone With the Wind" period. That might be appealing, but it's a mistake, because what we get is a constant imitation of a Gable performance, rather than Gable as he must have been off-screen. Further proof that this film is not a re-creation of the Gable-Lombard love affair, but a corny love story featuring Gable in his most popular screen personage the aw, shucks, reluctant sex symbol.

So far I haven't mentioned Jill Clayburgh's more successful performance as comedienne Lombard. The reason is Lombard is not crucial to this movie. Not many people remember her, at least not enough to warrant financing for the film. Her subordinate role is apparent in the film itself. The script presents her as a foul-mouthed, slightly, cloying gal with a powerful hankering for the big lug that is Gable.

Variety called it

a film with many major assets, not the least of which is the stunning and smashing performance of Jill Clayburgh as Carole Lombard. James Brolin manages excellently to project the necessary Clark Gable attributes while adding his own individuality to the characterization . . . [the film] is candid without being prurient; delightful without being superficially glossy; heart-warming without being corny.

Time Out London says,

The film seems as insulated and remote from the real Hollywood as Hollywood vehicles of the time were from the real world. Allen Garfield does a reasonable turn as Louis Mayer, but Brolin is a wax dummy and Clayburgh produces a very modern version of the Lombard larkishness.

TV Guide awarded it one out of a possible four stars, calling it

a cardboard retelling of the Clark Gable-Carole Lombard romance and marriage . . . Clayburgh as Lombard is adequate, but Brolin has none of the charisma that made Gable a premier screen idol. The major problem is the superficial script.
