= Barry Sandler =

American screenwriter and film producer (born 1947)

- Born: February 23, 1947 (age 79); Buffalo, New York, United States
- Occupations: Screenwriter, film producer

Barry Sandler (born February 23, 1947, in Buffalo, New York) is an American screenwriter and film producer. His career has spanned several decades, with the 1980s being his most prolific. The openly gay Sandler is perhaps best known for writing the 1982 film Making Love, the first mainstream Hollywood film to deal seriously with issues of homosexuality and coming out. Sandler discussed Making Love in the 1995 documentary film The Celluloid Closet.

In addition to his successful writing career, Sandler also teaches screenwriting at the University of Central Florida and serves as one of the artistic directors to Outfest, a gay and lesbian film festival in Los Angeles.

He is the recipient of the GLAAD Media Award and the Outfest 2002 Gay Pioneer Award for Courage and Artistry, and was named by The Advocate as one of the most influential gay artists in America.

== Filmography ==
=== Writer ===
- Kansas City Bomber – 1972
- The Loners – 1972
- The Duchess and the Dirtwater Fox – 1976
- Gable and Lombard – 1976
- The Other Side of Midnight – 1977 (uncredited)
- The Mirror Crack'd – 1980
- Evil Under the Sun – 1982 (uncredited)
- Making Love – 1982
- Crimes of Passion – 1984
- All-American Murder – 1992
- Evil Never Dies – 2003

- Knock ‘em Dead – 2014

=== Producer ===
- Making Love – 1982 (associate producer)
- Crimes of Passion – 1984
- All-American Murder – 1992 (co-producer)
