= Common Threads: Stories from the Quilt =

1989 film by Jeffrey Friedman, Rob Epstein

- Poster
- Directed by: Rob Epstein; Jeffrey Friedman
- Written by: Rob Epstein; Jeffrey Friedman; Cindy Ruskin
- Produced by: Bill Couturié; Rob Epstein; Jeffrey Friedman
- Narrated by: Dustin Hoffman
- Cinematography: Dyanna Taylor; Jean de Segonzac
- Edited by: Rob Epstein; Jeffrey Friedman
- Music by: Bobby McFerrin
- Production company: Telling Pictures
- Distributed by: Direct Cinema
- Release date: 1989
- Running time: 79 minutes
- Country: United States
- Language: English

Common Threads: Stories from the Quilt is a 1989 American documentary film that tells the story of the NAMES Project AIDS Memorial Quilt. Narrated by Dustin Hoffman, with a musical score written and performed by Bobby McFerrin, the film focuses on several people who are represented by panels in the Quilt, combining personal reminiscences with archive footage of the subjects, along with footage of various politicians, health professionals and other people with AIDS. Each section of the film is punctuated with statistics detailing the number of Americans diagnosed with and dead from AIDS through the early years of the epidemic. The film ends with the first display of the complete (to date) Quilt at the National Mall in Washington, D.C., during the 1987 Second National March on Washington for Lesbian and Gay Rights.

The film, made for HBO, was based in part on the book The Quilt: Stories From The NAMES Project by Cindy Ruskin (writer), Matt Herron (photographs) and Deborah Zemke (design).

The film relates the lives of five people memorialized with panels:

- Dr. Tom Waddell, physician and Olympic decathlete who founded the Gay Games; his story is told by his friend and mother of his child, Sara Lewinstein.
- David Mandell Jr., a young, 12-year-old hemophiliac; his storytellers are his parents, David Mandell and Suzi Mandell.
- Robert Perryman, an African-American man who contracted the disease through intravenous drug use; his widow, Sallie Perryman, tells his story.
- Jeffrey Sevcik, a gay man; his story is told by his partner, film critic and historian Vito Russo, who succumbed to the disease in 1990, five years after he was diagnosed.
- David C. Campbell, a Washington, D.C., landscape architect; his storyteller is his lover, U.S. Navy commander Tracy Torrey, who became his own storyteller as well, for he succumbed to the disease and was memorialized in the course of filming.

Along with these personal stories, the film reviews the history of the NAMES Project, and shows the process of creating quilt panels. It also documents the response — or perceived lack of it — to the onset of the AIDS epidemic by the Reagan administration through the use of archive footage of Reagan and members of his administration, the medical community's action in the face of the burgeoning health crisis, and the earliest attempts within the gay community to organize around the AIDS issue through the actions of activists, such as self-proclaimed "KS poster boy" Bobbi Campbell, Vito Russo (co-founder of the Gay and Lesbian Alliance Against Defamation (GLAAD)), and Gay Men's Health Crisis and ACT UP co-founder Larry Kramer.

In 2024, the film was selected for preservation in the United States National Film Registry by the Library of Congress as being "culturally, historically, or aesthetically significant".

== Awards ==
Common Threads: Stories from the Quilt won the Academy Award for Best Documentary Feature in 1990. This was the second Oscar for producer/director Rob Epstein. He had won previously for The Times of Harvey Milk, a biography of openly gay San Francisco politician Harvey Milk. The film also won the Interfilm Award at the 1990 Berlin Film Festival, the GLAAD Media Award for Outstanding Documentary, and a Peabody Award.

== DVD release ==
Common Threads: Stories from the Quilt was released on a Region 1 DVD June 8, 2004.

== Preservation ==
Common Threads: Stories from the Quilt was preserved in 2019 by the Academy Film Archive, in conjunction with Milestone Films and Outfest.

== Soundtrack ==
Bobby McFerrin's 1990 studio album Medicine Music can be easily passed off as the soundtrack to the film, and it includes the film's theme song, "Common Threads". The album reached number 146 on the Billboard 200 and number 2 on the Top Contemporary Jazz Albums chart.
