= Raymond Braun =

American media personality, journalist, endurance athlete, and documentary filmmaker

- Education: Stanford University
- Occupations: media personality; journalist; endurance athlete; documentary filmmaker

Raymond Braun is an American media personality, journalist, endurance athlete, and documentary filmmaker.

== Early life and education ==
Braun grew up in Toledo, Ohio, a city in Northwest Ohio. Braun graduated from Stanford University with a Bachelor of Arts in Science, Technology, and Society and a Master of Arts in Media studies and Journalism.

In the documentary State of Pride, which Braun hosted and produced, he discusses how his upbringing in Ohio influenced his decision to pursue a career in media. He credits the internet and news media with exposing him to diverse stories that shaped his perspective and inspired him to study the impact of media and technology on culture at Stanford University.

== Career ==
Braun worked in marketing at YouTube and Google. In 2013, he developed and implemented YouTube's first LGBTQ+ marketing campaign, "#ProudToLove," which involved turning the YouTube logo into a rainbow. He later became the LGBTQ marketing lead for Google and YouTube.

In 2019, Braun hosted and produced the documentary State of Pride, which premiered at the SXSW Film Festival. The film received critical recognition, winning the GLAAD Media Award for "Outstanding Documentary" and being listed by TIME as a "must-see" documentary for Pride Month. For his role as host and executive producer, Braun was named the "Doc Star of the Month" for June 2019 by the International Documentary Association.

He set a world record in 2023 as the first person to complete seven triathlons on seven continents in seven consecutive days. Known as the "World Triathlon Challenge," the effort aimed to raise awareness and funds for mental health programs in recognition of his own experience with OCD. In 2024 he completed the Abbott World Marathon Majors, serving as a guide for Chris Nikic, who became the first person with Down syndrome to finish all six races in the series.

== Paris 2024 Coverage ==
Braun served as a mental health correspondent at the Paris 2024 Olympic and Paralympic Games, focusing on athlete well-being, sports psychology, and mental resilience. His coverage featured interviews with Olympians, Paralympians, and sports figures, including with Novak Djokovic about mental resilience and maintaining a championship mindset under pressure.

== Awards and honors ==
- 2014, Forbes 30 Under 30 in marketing and advertising An update on Braun was included in their 2016 list.
- 2015, the Out 100
- 2016, the Financial Times ranked Braun No. 1 on its "Power Rankings: Top 50 Future LGBT Leaders" list.
- 2020, GLAAD Media Award for "Outstanding Documentary" for State of Pride That same year, he was named the "Doc Star of the Month" by the International Documentary Association.
