= Voices from the Front =

1991 documentary film

- Directed by: Robyn Hutt; Sandra Elgear; David Meieran
- Produced by: Sandra Elgear; David Meieran
- Edited by: Robyn Hutt; Sandra Elgear; David Meieran
- Production company: Testing the Limits Collective
- Release date: April 1991 (WorldFest)
- Running time: 88 minutes
- Country: United States
- Language: English

Voices from the Front is an American documentary film, released in 1991. Directed by Robyn Hutt, Sandra Elgear and David Meieran, the film is a portrait of the activism in the late 1980s around the HIV/AIDS crisis, including the work of organizations such as ACT UP and Queer Nation, and individuals such as Larry Kramer, Vito Russo and Peter Staley.

The film premiered at the WorldFest-Houston International Film Festival in 1991 and was subsequently screened at film festivals including the 1991 Frameline Film Festival and the 42nd Berlin International Film Festival in 1992, before going into commercial release in June 1992.

At Berlin the film won the Teddy Award for best LGBTQ-related documentary film.
