= Jeffrey Friedman (filmmaker) =

American film director and producer (born 1951)

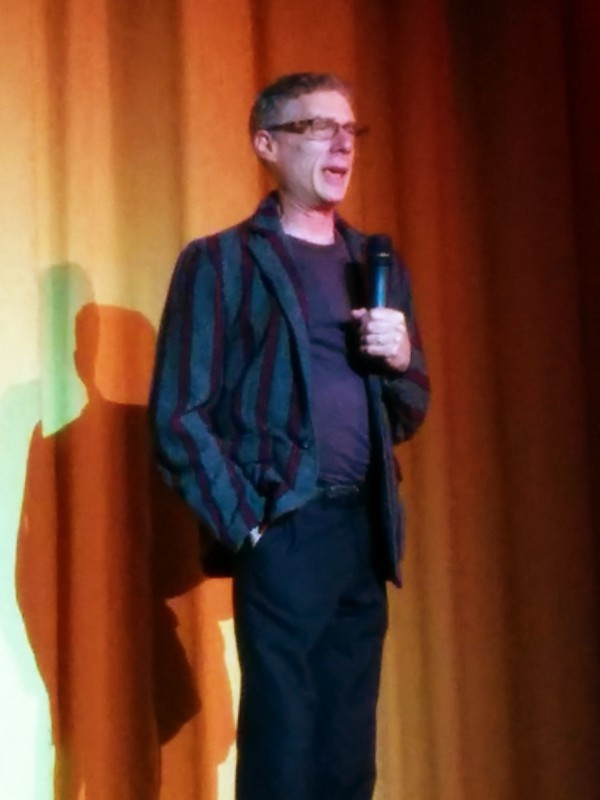
- Friedman in 2015
- Born: August 24, 1951 (age 74); Los Angeles, California, U.S.
- Occupation: Filmmaker
- Years active: 1972–present

Jeffrey Friedman (born August 24, 1951) is an American filmmaker. In 2021, he and Rob Epstein won a Grammy Award for their work on the documentary film Linda Ronstadt: The Sound of My Voice.

== Career ==
Jeffrey Friedman grew up in New York City, where his mother was an actor and his father taught undergraduate English literature and edited and published a small literary magazine. He began studying acting when he was nine, and at 12, he acted professionally in two off-Broadway productions. He played Emil in Emil and the Detectives and a schoolboy on the first day of integration in Little Rock, Arkansas in Black Monday by Reginald Rose.

Friedman began his film training by apprenticing in the editing rooms of films such as Marjoe (Academy Award, Documentary Feature, 1972) and William Friedkin's The Exorcist (1973). Other early credits include the pole-vault segment directed by Arthur Penn and edited by Dede Allen for Visions of Eight (1973) about the 1972 Munich Olympics, and Raging Bull (Academy Award, Film Editing, 1980), edited by Thelma Schoonmaker and directed by Martin Scorsese.

Friedman has been making films with Rob Epstein since 1987 when they formed the production company Telling Pictures in San Francisco, California. Friedman and Epstein's first film together was Common Threads: Stories from the Quilt, inspired by the NAMES Project AIDS Memorial Quilt. Narrated by Dustin Hoffman, Common Threads recounts the first decade of AIDS in America through stories of five individuals featured in the Quilt. The film won the Academy Award for Best Documentary Feature for Common Threads in 1990 as well as a Peabody Award. Common Threads was preserved by the Academy Film Archive, in conjunction with Milestone Films and Outfest, in 2019. In 2024 the film was added to the Library of Congress National Film Registry.

Their film The Celluloid Closet, based on the book by film historian Vito Russo, depicts a 100-year history of homosexual characters in Hollywood movies. Narrated by Lily Tomlin, The Celluloid Closet had its world premiere at the Venice Film Festival and was featured at the Toronto, New York, and Sundance Film Festivals (at which it received the juried Freedom of Expression Award) and at numerous international festivals, including Berlin, Tokyo, and Sydney. It received a Peabody Award and a duPont-Columbia journalism award alongside a News & Documentary Emmy for directing.

In 2000, they directed and produced Paragraph 175, a film that explores the untold history of homosexuals during the Nazi regime in Europe. Narrated by Rupert Everett and filmed in Germany, France and Spain, it had its U.S. premiere at the Sundance Film Festival in January 2000, where it was awarded the documentary Grand Jury Prize for directing, followed by a European premiere at the Berlin Film Festival in February, where it won a FIPRESCI award (Fédération Internationale de la Presse Cinématographique).

They wrote, directed, and co-produced Howl (2010), starring James Franco as the poet Allen Ginsberg. Howl premiered on opening night at the Sundance Film Festival, followed by the Berlin and London International Film Festivals. Howl received a 2011 Freedom of Expression Award from the National Board of Review.

In 2013, the duo directed Lovelace, starring Amanda Seyfried and Peter Sarsgaard, and it premiered at the Sundance and Berlin International Film Festival. In 2019, their documentary short End Game was nominated from an Academy Award, and two additional documentaries were released, first with the State of Pride premiering at South by Southwest followed by Linda Ronstadt: The Sound of My Voice premiering the Tribeca Film Festival.Linda Ronstadt: The Sound of My Voice won a Grammy Award for Best Musical Film in 2021.

In 2023, they released the concert film Taylor Mac's A 24-Decade History of Popular Music. The film premiered at Tribeca Festival, and was released on HBO and Max.

== Filmography ==
All films jointly with Rob Epstein:

- 1989: Common Threads: Stories from the Quilt — director, producer, writer
- 1993: Where Are We? Our Trip Through America — director, producer
- 1995: The Celluloid Closet — director, producer, writer
- 1999: Xtreme: Sports to Die For — director, producer (TV)
- 2000: Paragraph 175 — director, producer
- 2002: Underground Zero — director (segment "Isaiah's Rap")
- 2002: Crime & Punishment — director, producer (TV series aka "Law & Order: Crime & Punishment")
- 2006: Ten Days That Unexpectedly Changed America: Gold Rush — director (TV)
- 2007: Save Me — executive producer
- 2009: Sex in '69: The Sexual Revolution in America — executive producer
- 2010: Howl — director, producer, writer
- 2013: Lovelace — director
- 2013: The Battle of amfAR — director, producer
- 2014: And the Oscar Goes to... — director, producer, writer
- 2016: Killing the Colorado — executive producer (TV)
- 2018: End Game — director
- 2019: State of Pride — director, producer
- 2019: Linda Ronstadt: The Sound of My Voice — director, producer
- 2023: Taylor Mac's A 24-Decade History of Popular Music – director
