= Rob Epstein =

American film director, producer, writer and editor

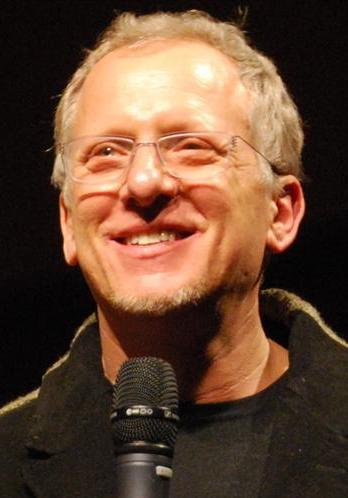
- Epstein in 2013
- Born: Robert P. Epstein; April 6, 1955 (age 71); New Brunswick, New Jersey, U.S.
- Occupations: Film director and producer
- Years active: 1978–present

Robert P. Epstein (born April 6, 1955), is an American director, producer, writer, and editor. He is known for directing numerous documentaries, several of them focusing on the LGBTQ community and has won two Academy Awards, two Emmy Awards, and a Grammy Award.

Epstein won the Academy Award for Best Documentary Feature twice for the films The Times of Harvey Milk (1984) and Common Threads: Stories from the Quilt (1989). He was nominated for the Academy Award for Best Documentary Short Film for End Game (2018). He also directed the documentaries Word Is Out: Stories of Some of Our Lives (1977), The AIDS Show (1986), The Celluloid Closet (1996), and Paragraph 175 (2000). He made his narrative directorial film debut with the historical drama Howl (2010) followed by Lovelace (2013).

== Career ==
In 1987, Epstein and his filmmaking partner Jeffrey Friedman founded Telling Pictures, a production company that focused on feature documentaries. Epstein's works also include scripted narratives such as Howl, his award-winning film about Allen Ginsberg's controversial poem by the same name (starring James Franco), and Lovelace, the story about the life and trials of pornographic superstar Linda Lovelace (starring Amanda Seyfried).

== Personal life ==
Epstein co-founded the Film Program at California College of the Arts in San Francisco, California. He also serves as a visiting professor at NYU’s Tisch School of the Arts. In 2025, he received an honorary doctorate from CCA recognizing his groundbreaking work as a filmmaker and educator over many decades. He is gay.

== Filmography ==
=== Narrative films ===
Year	Title	Director	Producer	Write	Notes
2010	Howl	Yes	Yes	Yes	
2013	Lovelace	Yes	No	No	

=== Documentaries ===
Year	Title	Director	Producer	Editor	Notes
1977	Word Is Out: Stories of Some of Our Lives	Yes	Yes	Yes	
1984	The Times of Harvey Milk	Yes	Yes	Yes	
1986	The AIDS Show	Yes	Yes	No	
1989	Common Threads: Stories from the Quilt	Yes	Yes	Yes	
1989	Where Are We? Our Trip Through America	Yes	Yes	No	
1995	The Celluloid Closet	Yes	Yes	No	
2000	Paragraph 175	Yes	Yes	No	
2005	An Evening with Eddie Gomez	Yes	No	No	
2014	And the Oscar Goes to...	Yes	Yes	Yes	
2018	End Game	Yes	Yes	Yes	Short film
2019	State of Pride	Yes	No	No	
2019	Linda Ronstadt: The Sound of My Voice	Yes	Yes	No	
2023	Taylor Mac's A 24-Decade History of Popular Music	Yes	No	No	

=== Television ===
Year	Title	Notes	Ref.
2002	Underground Zero	Segment: "Isiah's Rap"	
2002-2004	Crime & Punishment	TV series	
2006	10 Days That Unexpectedly Changed America	Episode: "Gold Rush"	

== Awards and nominations ==
Year	Association	Category	Nominated work	Result	Ref.
1984	Academy Award	Academy Award for Best Documentary Feature	The Times of Harvey Milk	Won	
1984	News & Documentary Emmy Awards	Interview/Interviewer - Programs	The Times of Harvey Milk	Won	
1989	Academy Award	Best Documentary Feature	Common Threads: Stories from the Quilt	Won	
1995	Primetime Emmy Award	Outstanding Informational Special	The Celluloid Closet	Nominated	
1995	News & Documentary Emmy Awards	Outstanding Individual Achievement in a Craft: Directors	The Celluloid Closet	Won	
2000	News & Documentary Emmy Awards	Outstanding Individual Achievement in a Craft: Direction	Paragraph 175	Nominated	
2000	News & Documentary Emmy Awards	Outstanding Historical Documentary - Long Form	Paragraph 175	Nominated	
2001	GLAAD Media Award	Davidson/Valentini Award	Himself	Won	
2018	Academy Award	Best Documentary Short Film	End Game	Nominated	
2019	Grammy Award	Best Music Film	Linda Ronstadt: The Sound of My Voice	Won	
