= Vito Russo =

American historian and LGBTQ activist (1946–1990)

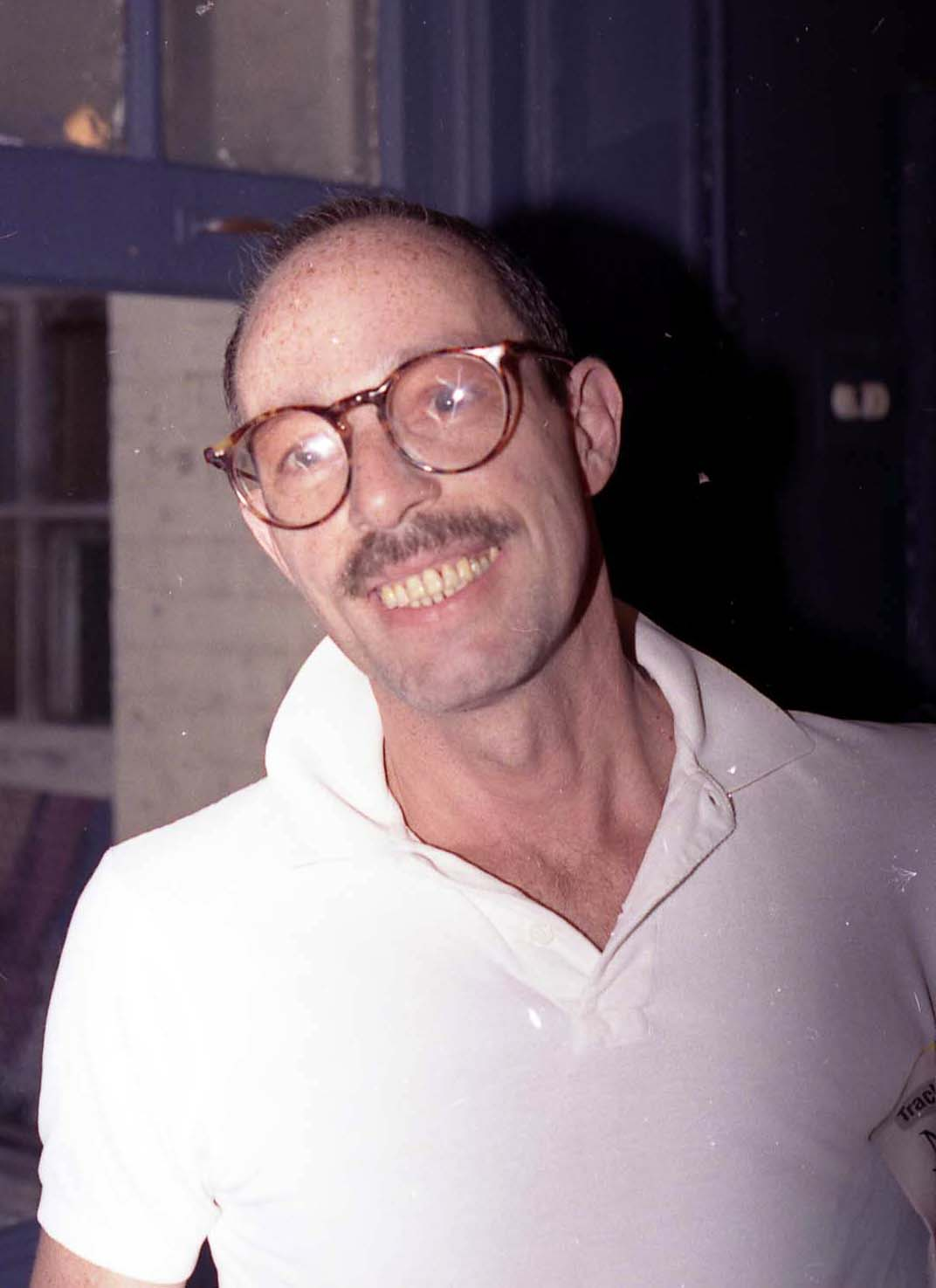
- Russo in 1989
- Born: July 11, 1946; New York City, U.S.
- Died: November 7, 1990 (aged 44); New York City, U.S.
- Education: Fairleigh Dickinson University; New York University
- Occupations: Activist; film historian; author
- Notable work: The Celluloid Closet
- Partner: Jeffrey Sevcik

Vito Russo (/ˈruːsoʊ/; July 11, 1946 – November 7, 1990) was an American LGBT activist, film historian, and author. He is best remembered as the author of the book The Celluloid Closet (1981, revised edition 1987), described in The New York Times as "an essential reference book" on homosexuality in the US film industry. In 1985, he co-founded the Gay and Lesbian Alliance Against Defamation (GLAAD), a media watchdog organization that strives to end anti-LGBT rhetoric, and advocates for LGBTQ inclusion in popular media.

== Life and work ==
Vito Russo was born in 1946 in Italian Harlem (East Harlem), Manhattan. Growing up, Russo was disturbed by the stereotypical portrayals of gay people in media. After witnessing the Stonewall riot in 1969 and hearing about another raid the following year, Russo became avidly involved in the emerging Gay Activists Alliance.

Russo obtained his undergraduate degree from Fairleigh Dickinson University and earned his Master's in film at New York University. While earning his Master's, Russo also worked with the film departments at a Gay Community Center and New York's Museum of Modern Art. It was his interaction with these communities that led to the synthesis of his politics and works.

Russo developed his material following screenings of camp films shown as fundraisers for the Gay Activists Alliance. He traveled throughout the country from 1972 to 1982, delivering The Celluloid Closet as a live lecture presentation with film clips at colleges, universities, and small cinemas such as the Roxie Cinema in San Francisco and the Hirschfeld Biograph in Dublin. In both the book and in the lecture/film clip presentation, he related the history of gay and lesbian moments – and the treatment of gay and lesbian characters – in American and foreign films of the past.

Russo worked for a time for The Emerald City on Channel J, where he interviewed public figures including John Waters.

In 1983, Russo wrote, produced, and hosted a series focusing on the gay community called Our Time for WNYC-TV public television, that was co-hosted by Marcia Pally. This series featured the nation's first GLBT hard news and documentary video segment produced and directed by social behaviorist D. S. Vanderbilt.

Russo's concern over how LGBTQ people were presented in the popular media led him to co-found the Gay and Lesbian Alliance Against Defamation (GLAAD), a watchdog group that monitors LGBTQ representation in the mainstream media and presents the annual GLAAD Media Awards. The Vito Russo Award is named in his memory and is presented to an openly gay or lesbian member of the media community for their outstanding contribution in combating homophobia. Russo was also actively involved in the AIDS direct action group ACT UP.

Russo appeared in the 1989 documentary Common Threads: Stories from the Quilt as a "storyteller," relating the life and death of his lover Jeffrey Sevcik. The film won the Academy Award for Best Documentary Feature at the 62nd Academy Awards.

In 1990, Russo spent a year at the University of California, Santa Cruz, teaching a class, also titled "The Celluloid Closet". He enjoyed being a professor, spending lecture breaks smoking and joking with his students.

Also in 1990, Merrill College at UC Santa Cruz established Vito Russo House to promote Gay, Lesbian, Bisexual and Transgender awareness and provide a safe and comfortable living environment for queer, straight-supportive and all students who value and appreciate diversity. The house tailors its programming to meet the needs of LGBTQ students and offers all an opportunity to build understanding and tolerance.

== Death and legacy ==
Russo was diagnosed with HIV in 1985 and died of AIDS-related complications in 1990. His work was posthumously brought to television in the 1996 documentary film The Celluloid Closet, co-executive-produced and narrated by Lily Tomlin. His memorial was held at the Rutherford Congregational Church in Rutherford, New Jersey.

He appeared in the film Voices from the Front, a feature-length documentary in 1991 on AIDS activism in America created by the video collective Testing the Limits.

After his death, there was a memorial in Santa Cruz put on by students and colleagues. There were testimonials about how inspirational he had been and en masse, the group sang "Over the Rainbow" in his memory.

Russo's papers are held by the New York Public Library.

A family-approved biography of Russo's life, written by NYIT professor Michael Schiavi, titled Celluloid Activist: The Life and Times of Vito Russo, was published by the University of Wisconsin Press in April 2011. A two-volume Vito Russo reader was published in July 2012 by White Crane Books, titled Out Spoken: The Vito Russo Reader – Reel One and Out Spoken: The Vito Russo Reader – Reel Two. Reel One presents his film writings; Reel Two collects his political/social commentaries.

The documentary film Vito had its festival premiere within the 2011 New York Film Festival, went on to screen at the Maryland Film Festival, and had its television premiere on HBO on June 23, 2012. It is directed by Jeffrey Schwarz of the Los Angeles production company Automat Pictures.

In 2013, GLAAD named the "Vito Russo test" after him, a set of criteria intended to analyze the representation of LGBTQ characters in films.

In 2016, Russo was inducted into the Legacy Walk.

From 1969 until his death, Russo lived at 401 West 24th Street in Chelsea, Manhattan.

In June 2019, Russo was one of the inaugural 50 American "pioneers, trailblazers, and heroes" inducted on the National LGBTQ Wall of Honor within the Stonewall National Monument (SNM) in New York City's Stonewall Inn. The SNM is the first U.S. national monument dedicated to LGBTQ rights and history, and the wall's unveiling was timed to take place during the 50th anniversary of the Stonewall riots.

Season 1, episode 10 of the podcast Making Gay History is about him.
