= List of films shot in Baltimore =

Movies, TV shows, and documentaries filmed in Baltimore include:

- Absolute Power
- The Accidental Tourist
- Ace of Cakes
- Airline
- Along Came a Spider
- Amazing Grace (1974)
- America's Most Wanted
- ...And Justice For All
- Avalon
- Ax 'Em
- Beauty Shop
- The Bedroom Window
- Boys
- Cecil B. DeMented
- Clara's Heart
- The Corner
- Cry-Baby
- The Curve
- Dave
- Desperate Living
- Detention
- Diner
- Diners, Drive-Ins and Dives
- A Dirty Shame
- The Distinguished Gentleman
- Divine Trash
- Enemy of the State
- Failure to Launch
- Female Trouble
- First Invasion: War of 1812
- First Sunday
- For Richer or Poorer (1997)
- Gods and Generals
- Guarding Tess
- Hag in a Black Leather Jacket
- Hairspray (1988 version)
- He Said, She Said
- Head of State
- Her Alibi
- He's Just Not That Into You
- Home for the Holidays
- Homicide
- Homicide: Life on the Street
- Homicide: The Movie
- Hook, Line and Dinner
- House of Cards
- The Invasion
- House on Sorority Row
- Ladder 49
- Liberty
- Liberty Heights
- The Life of Bailey
- Live Free or Die Hard
- Major League II
- Marnie
- Maxum Xul
- Men
- Men Don't Leave
- The Meteor Man
- Mondo Trasho
- The Mosquito Coast
- Multiple Maniacs
- On the Block
- The Passing
- Pecker
- The Photon Effect
- Pink Flamingos
- Polyester
- Princess
- Putty Hill
- Random Hearts
- Red Dragon
- The Replacements
- Roc
- Roulette
- Runaway Bride
- The Salon
- Satisfaction
- The Seduction of Joe Tynan
- Serial Mom
- The Service
- Shooter
- Shot in the Heart
- Silent Fall
- Sleepless in Seattle
- Something the Lord Made
- Species II
- Stage Fright
- Step Up
- Step Up 2: The Streets
- The Sum of All Fears
- That Night
- Tin Men
- Tuck Everlasting
- Twelve Monkeys
- Violets Are Blue
- Veep
- Washington Square
- While You Were Out
- The Wire
- XXX: State of the Union
- The Young Americans
