= Pat Moran (filmmaker) =

American filmmaker

- Born: Patricia Moran c. 1946; Baltimore County, Maryland, U.S.
- Known for: Member of the Dreamlanders; Emmy Award-winning casting director
- Spouse: Chuck Yeaton
- Children: 2
- Website: www.patmorancasting.com

Patricia Moran Yeaton (born c. 1940), known professionally as Pat Moran, is an American actress and casting director active in Baltimore, having won three Emmy Awards for her work. Since early in her career, Moran has been a member of the Dreamlanders, director John Waters's regular cast of actors, being, along with Mink Stole and Mary Vivian Pearce, the only actresses to appear in every film directed by Waters.

== Biography ==
Born as the oldest of five siblings, Moran is the only daughter of Irish-American parents John Joseph and Grace (née Swietzer) Moran. Her father was a musician and orchestra director who often performed at the S.S. Tolchester.

Moran was raised in Catonsville, in Baltimore County, and Beechfield, in Southwest Baltimore, studying at Mount de Sales Academy. She originally met director John Waters in 1964 and soon worked in his films, usually finding actors and securing locations, along with making her debut in Waters' directorial full-length debut, Mondo Trasho (1969). Moran was the owner of the dog whose feces Divine ate in the infamous final scene of Pink Flamingos (1972). She played Patty Hitler in the film, a Nazi gossiper who supplies vital information to the main characters, but her role was mostly cut from the film, being reduced to a minor cameo in a party scene. A member of his regular cast, the Dreamlanders, she has played a role in every Waters film, a title she shares only with fellow actresses Mink Stole and Mary Vivian Pearce. In 1987, Moran, along with Waters, worked on co-founding AIDS Action Baltimore after seeing many of their friends die of HIV/AIDS. Since the 1990s, Moran has worked in casting for various TV shows, including NBC's Homicide: Life on the Street (1993–1999) and HBO's The Wire (2002–2008). More recently she has worked on Maryland-produced movies such as Wedding Crashers (2005), Syriana (2005) and Golden Globe-winning Game Change (2012).

Moran married Charles K. Yeaton, who she started dating in 1970. They have two children, Brook Hopley and Greer S. Yeaton, both fellow filmmakers.

== Filmography as actress ==
Year	Title	Role	Notes
1969	Mondo Trasho	Dr. Coathanger's secretary	
1970	Multiple Maniacs	Cavalcade Patron	
1972	Pink Flamingos	Patty Hitler	
1974	Female Trouble	Bitch Prisoner	
1988	Hairspray		
1990	Cry-Baby		
1994	Serial Mom		
1998	Pecker		
2000	Cecil B. Demented		
