= Vincent Peranio =

American production designer (born 1945)

- Born: 1945 (age 80–81); Baltimore, Maryland, U.S.
- Education: Maryland Institute College of Art (MFA)
- Occupations: Production designer; art director
- Years active: 1970–2016
- Spouse: Dolores Deluxe

Vincent Peranio (born 1945) is a retired American production designer, art director, set designer, and actor.

Peranio began his career designing film sets for John Waters. Because of his work with Waters, he is considered one of the Dreamlanders, Waters' ensemble of regular cast and crew members.

== Biography ==
Peranio was born in 1945 in Baltimore, and received a Master of Fine Arts degree from the Maryland Institute College of Art in 1968. He is of Italian ancestry.

Peranio's first credited project is the creation of Lobstora, a room-sized rapacious lobster in Waters' Multiple Maniacs (1970).

After Multiple Maniacs, Peranio developed a successful career creating the sets for all subsequent films of Waters and other films and TV shows, including Barry Levinson's Liberty Heights and the crime dramas, Homicide: Life on the Street, The Corner, and the HBO television production The Wire.

At times, Peranio's brother Ed Peranio assisted with prop construction and creating effects, as well as portraying minor roles in the early Waters films.

Peranio retired in 2016.

=== Personal life ===
Peranio and his wife, designer Dolores Deluxe, moved to Tavira, Portugal, in 2019. They had previously lived on Dallas Street in Fell's Point, Baltimore, where they gradually bought four adjoining rowhouses and merged them, modeling the property after an Italian villa, which was eventually dubbed the "Palace on Dallas".

== Filmography ==
=== Cinema ===
==== Production design ====
- Multiple Maniacs (1970) (designer of Lobstora)
- Pink Flamingos (1972) (also Set Design/Art Direction/Technical Assistant)
- Female Trouble (1974) (also Art Direction)
- Desperate Living (1977) (as Set Designer)
- The Hitter (1979) (as Set Designer)
- Polyester (1981)
- Hairspray (1988) (also Art Direction)
- Cry-Baby (1990)
- Serial Mom (1994)
- Pecker (1998)
- Liberty Heights (1999)
- Cecil B. DeMented (2000)
- Book of Shadows: Blair Witch 2 (2000)
- Replay (2003)
- A Dirty Shame (2004)
- This Filthy World (2006)
- Bay of Pigs (2008)

==== Art direction ====
- The Prize Fighter (1979)
- The Private Eyes (1980)
- Ruckus (1981)
- The House on Sorority Row (1983)
- The Adventure of the Action Hunters (1987)

==== Actor ====
- Multiple Maniacs (1970) as Freak
- Pink Flamingos (1972) as Musician at Party
- Love Letter to Edie (1975) as Sailor in Bar
- The Adventure of the Action Hunters (1987) as 1st

=== Television production design ===
- Darrow (1991)
- Homicide: Life on the Street (84 episodes from 1993–1999)
- The Corner (2000)
- Young Americans (2000) (unknown episodes)
- Shot in the Heart (2001)
- The Wire (51 episodes from 2002–2008)
- Something the Lord Made (2004)

=== Other ===
- Edith's Shopping Bag (1976) (Himself)
- The Bedroom Window (1987) (set buyer: Baltimore)
- Divine Trash (1998) (himself)
- Anatomy of a 'Homicide: Life on the Street' (1998) (as himself)
- It Came from Baltimore (2005) (Himself)
- All the Dirt on 'A Dirty Shame' (2005) (Himself)
- The Wire: It's All Connected (2006) (Himself)
- The Roots of 'Hairspray' (2007) (Himself)
