= Susan Lowe =

American actress, educator and painter (born 1948)

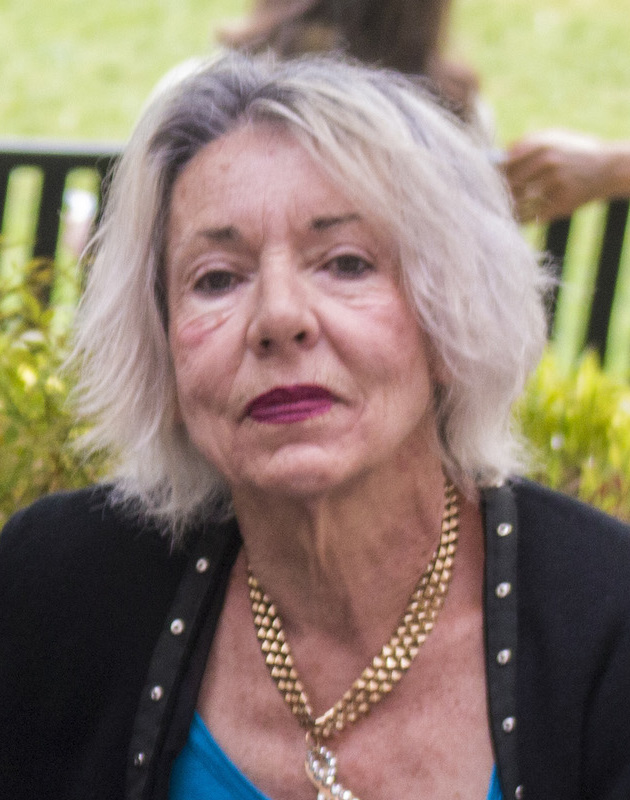
- Born: Laura Susan Lowe; January 19, 1948 (age 78); Reidsville, North Carolina, U. S.
- Education: Maryland Institute College of Art
- Occupations: Actress, Educator, Artist
- Known for: Dreamlanders
- Children: 2

Laura Susan Lowe (born January 19, 1948) is an American actress, educator and painter. She has appeared almost exclusively in the works of John Waters for most of her career, starring in ten of his films.

== About ==
Lowe was born in Reidsville, North Carolina on January 19, 1948. She was a student at the Maryland Institute College of Art (MICA) in the 1960s, when she became friends with Divine and other Dreamlanders.

Her first role with Waters was playing an asylum inmate in Mondo Trasho. She continued to play small parts in many of his films, but played the lead role of Mole McHenry, the ultra-butch bleach blonde lesbian, in Desperate Living.

She has taught art history classes at MICA, Catonsville Community College, and University of Maryland.

== Personal life ==
Lowe has been married twice, and has two children. Her first husband, surnamed McLean, was a drawing teacher at the Maryland Institute College of Art (MICA), where Lowe had worked as a model. They wed in Ireland and had two children, Ruby and Ramsey McLean. The marriage ended seven years later. She later married Frank Tomboro of Baltimore. That union also ended in divorce.

== Filmography ==
Filmography
Year	Title	Role	Notes
1969	Mondo Trasho	as an asylum inmate	
1970	Multiple Maniacs	as Suzi (Cavalcade Pervert)	
1974	Female Trouble	as Vikki, the receptionist	Her son, Ramsey McLean, appeared as the infant "Taffy" in this 1974 film. During her scenes in the film, Lowe was visibly pregnant; the birth scene was filmed a few days after Lowe gave birth.
1977	Desperate Living	as Mole McHenry, a lesbian heroine	
1981	Polyester	as Mall Victim	
1988	Hairspray	as Angry Mother	
1990	Cry-Baby	as Night Court Parent	
1994	Serial Mom	as Court Groupie B	
1998	Pecker	as Hairdresser	
2000	Cecil B. DeMented	as Family Lady A	
2003	Pigeon Envy	As The Pigeon Lady	
2013	I Am Divine	as Herself	
