= Van Smith =

American costume designer and makeup artist

- Van Smith from Steve Yeager's 1998 documentary Divine Trash
- Born: Walter Avant Smith, Jr. August 17, 1945; Marianna, Florida
- Died: December 5, 2006 (aged 61); Marianna, Florida
- Other names: Walter Avant Smith, Jr
- Occupations: Costume designer Makeup artist
- Known for: Dreamlanders

Walter Avant "Van" Smith, Jr. (August 17, 1945 - December 5, 2006) was an American costume designer and make-up artist. He worked primarily in the films of John Waters, designing the costumes and make-up for every John Waters film from 1972 to 2004. Because of his work with Waters, he is considered one of the Dreamlanders, Waters' ensemble of regular cast and crew members.

The first John Waters film Smith worked on was Pink Flamingos (1972), for which he designed the costumes and make-up for the film's star, female-impersonating actor Divine, as well as the rest of the cast. In this film Smith, along with Waters, created the famous look for Divine which included a white clown face base and a shaved-back hairline with the eyebrows drawn on the upper forehead. Waters said he wanted Divine's make-up to look like a cross between Jayne Mansfield and Clarabell the Clown.

This was followed by Smith's work on Female Trouble (1974), which featured a cast of flamboyant criminals and hairdressers whose costumes are overtly tacky and whose make-up is extreme. For Divine's wedding scene in the film, Smith designed a see-through wedding dress for the 300 lb. bride.

Smith went on to create the look for the grotesque citizens of Mortville in Desperate Living (1977). In Waters' next seven films, Smith demonstrated the ability to create interesting looks for characters with big personalities but more conventional appearances as Waters' movies became more mainstream.

Smith died of a heart attack in Marianna, Florida on December 5, 2006.

== Filmography ==
=== Make-up and costume design ===
- Pink Flamingos (1972)
- Female Trouble (1974)
- Desperate Living (1977)
- Polyester (1981)
- Hairspray (1988)
- Cry-Baby (1990)
- Serial Mom (1994)
- Pecker (1998)
- Cecil B. Demented (2000)
- A Dirty Shame (2004)

=== As himself ===
- Divine Trash (1998)
- It Came from Baltimore (2005) (Video)
- All the Dirt on A Dirty Shame (2005) (Video)

=== Other ===
- Pink Flamingos (1972) Birthday party guest in drag
- Homicide: Life on the Street (2 episodes, 1993)
