= Susan Walsh (actress) =

American actress (1948–2009)

- Susan Walsh as Chicklette in Female Trouble (1974)
- Born: March 30, 1948; Baltimore, Maryland, U.S.
- Died: February 6, 2009 (aged 60); Baltimore, Maryland, U.S.
- Other name: Susan Story Bowers
- Occupation: Film actress
- Known for: Dreamlanders

Susan Walsh (March 30, 1948 – February 6, 2009) was an American actress. She worked primarily in the films of John Waters. Because of her work with Waters, she is considered one of the Dreamlanders, Waters' ensemble of regular cast and crew members.

== Biography ==
Walsh is reported to have died of natural causes on February 6, 2009, at the age of 60.

== Filmography ==
- Mondo Trasho (1969) (uncredited) as Shocked Laundromat Patron
- Multiple Maniacs (1970) as Female Church-Goer
- Pink Flamingos (1972) as Suzie
- Female Trouble (1974) as Chicklette
- Divine Trash (1998) as herself
