= I Am Divine =

2013 film by Jeffrey Schwarz

- Film poster
- Directed by: Jeffrey Schwarz
- Produced by: Jeffrey Schwarz; Jon Glover; Lance Robertson; Lotti Pharriss Knowles
- Starring: See Participants
- Cinematography: John Chater; John Davis; Dan DeJesus; David A. Ford; Marsha Kham; Cameron MacDonald; James Mulryan; Elle Schneider; Steven Wacks; Clay Westervelt
- Edited by: Phillip J. Bartell
- Music by: Michael Cudahy
- Production company: Automat Pictures
- Distributed by: Wolfe Video
- Release date: March 9, 2013 (SXSW)
- Running time: 90 minutes
- Country: United States
- Box office: $81,497

I Am Divine is a 2013 American documentary film produced and directed by Jeffrey Schwarz of the Los Angeles-based production company Automat Pictures. The documentary focuses on the American actor, singer, and drag performer Divine (October 19, 1945 – March 7, 1988), born Harris Glenn Milstead, a lifelong friend and collaborator of filmmaker John Waters.

The film features extensive contemporary interviews with Waters, as well as Divine's mother Frances Milstead, and surviving members of the Dreamlanders.

== Participants ==
- John Waters
- Tab Hunter
- Ricki Lake
- Mink Stole
- George Figgs
- Bruce Vilanch
- Lisa Jane Persky
- David DeCoteau
- Susan Lowe
- Mary Vivian Pearce
- Jackie Beat
- Peaches Christ
- Tammie Brown
- Michael Musto
- Holly Woodlawn

Archive footage

- Harris Glenn Milstead/Divine
- Edith Massey
- Cookie Mueller
- David Lochary
- Leo Ford
- George Masters
- Tally Brown
- Van Smith

== Release ==
I Am Divine premiered at South by Southwest 2013, and had its premiere in Divine's hometown of Baltimore, Maryland as part of the Maryland Film Festival 2013.

== Reception ==
The film garnered critical acclaim, holding a 96% rating on Rotten Tomatoes based on 53 reviews; the general consensus states: "With warmth and affection, I Am Divine offers an engaging portrait of the complex personality behind a trailblazing cinematic figure." On Metacritic, the film has a 70 out of 100 rating, based on 13 critics.
