= Elizabeth Coffey =

American actress

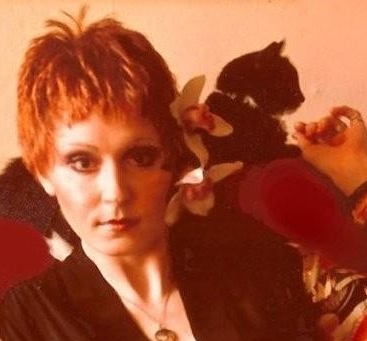
- Coffey at the Female Trouble premiere
- Born: March 1948 (age 78); Brooklyn, New York City, U.S.
- Occupation: Film actress
- Known for: Member of the Dreamlanders
- Children: 1 (adoptive)

Elizabeth Coffey Williams (née Coffey, born March 1948), simply known by her maiden name Elizabeth Coffey, is an American actress and transgender activist. Coffey, a trans woman, had small but significant roles in four of the early films of John Waters, becoming a member of the Dreamlanders, his regular cast. Her work has been shown at multiple national venues, including the Baltimore Museum of Art and the Chicago Art Institute.

== Early life and education ==
Coffey was born in 1948 in Brooklyn, New York City, the oldest of five children. At the age of 5, her family moved to Philadelphia, Pennsylvania, where she was raised and attended Northeast Catholic High School, a private, all-male Catholic school, where she often rebelled against the dress code by presenting as a woman, wearing long hair with ponytails, and dating boys. According to her, her parents were "too uptight" to talk to her about her gender identity, but at one point confronted her, asking if she was a "queer" and separating her from the rest of her siblings. Eventually, they accepted it and let her return to the family.

== Career ==
In 1970, she hitchhiked to Baltimore, Maryland, where she openly identified as a transgender woman. While there, she met filmmaker John Waters while in the basement of a church during the premiere of one of his earlier films, Multiple Maniacs. Upon learning that Coffey was transgender, he described to her the idea to include her in his next film as a flasher.

At the time of her first film appearance in Waters' Pink Flamingos (1972), Coffey was a pre-operative transgender woman who had already undergone hormone therapy to develop breasts and female features, starting in the summer of 1972. She played the part of a beautiful woman who turns the tables on a perverted flasher/voyeur by exposing herself and flashing him, sending him fleeing in shock. Coffey underwent gender confirmation surgery a week after her scene was filmed, becoming one of the first trans women to get gender confirmation surgery from Johns Hopkins Hospital. Soon after, Coffey joined her regular cast of the Dreamlanders, Waters' ensemble of regular cast and crew members, also appearing the films, Female Trouble (1974) playing Earnestine, the sorrowful death row cellmate of Dawn Davenport (Divine), Desperate Living (1977), and Hairspray (1988).

Later on, Coffey moved to Rockford, Illinois, where she married and adopted a child. Later on, she divorced and moved back to Pennsylvania.

She remains in contact with Waters, inaugurating gender-neutral bathrooms at the Baltimore Museum of Art along with him in 2021, and has worked with several AIDS-related charities. Coffey lives in Philadelphia in the John C. Anderson Apartments, an LGBTQ-friendly senior living community, where she co-facilitates TransWay, a trans and gender non-conforming support group.

== Filmography ==
- Pink Flamingos (1972) as trans flasher
- Female Trouble (1974) as Earnestine
- Desperate Living (1977) as bartender
- Hairspray (1988) as Dance kid mom
