= George Figgs =

American actor and projectionist

- Born: 1947 (age 78–79); Baltimore, Maryland
- Occupations: Actor; Projectionist; Film historian
- Known for: Dreamlanders

George Figgs (born 1947, Baltimore, Maryland) is an American actor and projectionist. He began his career portraying characters in the early films of John Waters. Because of his work with Waters, he is considered one of the Dreamlanders, Waters' ensemble of regular cast and crew members.

Figgs is a film historian interested in film noir and independent films. From 1991 to 1999 Figgs was the owner/operator of the Orpheum Cinema in the Fell's Point section of Baltimore.

== Filmography ==
=== Film roles ===
- Mondo Trasho (1969) as Asylum Inmate/Man in Waiting Room
- Multiple Maniacs (1970) as Jesus Christ
- Pink Flamingos (1972) as Bongo player
- Female Trouble (1974) as Dribbles
- Desperate Living (1977) as Herbert
- Polyester (1981) as Abortion Picketer
- Divine Trash (1998) as himself
- A Dirty Shame (2004) as Neuter (uncredited)
- I Am Divine (2013) as himself

=== Crew ===
- Serial Mom (1994) (projectionist)
- Major League II (1994) (projectionist)
- 12 Monkeys (1995) (projectionist: Baltimore)
- Home for the Holidays (1995) (projectionist) (uncredited)
- Boys (1996) (projectionist)
- Pecker (1998) (dailies projectionist) (uncredited)
- Cecil B. DeMented (2000) (projectionist)
