= The Diane Linkletter Story =

1970 film by John Waters

- Divine as Diane Linkletter
- Directed by: John Waters
- Written by: John Waters
- Produced by: John Waters
- Starring: Divine; David Lochary; Mary Vivian Pearce
- Cinematography: John Waters
- Edited by: John Waters
- Distributed by: Dreamland; The Mara Company
- Release date: April 10, 1970
- Running time: 9 minutes
- Country: United States
- Language: English

The Diane Linkletter Story is a 1970 16mm short film by American filmmaker John Waters starring Divine, Mary Vivian Pearce, and David Lochary.

== Overview ==
This improvised film is based on the 1969 suicide of TV personality Art Linkletter's daughter, Diane. In the film, Mr. and Mrs. Linkletter fret about their daughter's recent behavior, which includes taking drugs and dating a lowlife named Jim. Eventually, the parents confront Diane, which results in her suicide under the influence of LSD. Waters claims that the film is "accidental" – he and his friends improvised a story while testing a new synch-sound camera (later used on Multiple Maniacs). The film had a very limited release in the early 1970s, mainly in art houses as short feature before Pink Flamingos, and gained a wider audience when it showed up on a 1990 videotape entitled A Divine Double Feature, paired with a live recording of the off-Broadway play The Neon Woman, which also starred Divine.

== Cast ==
- Divine as Diane Linkletter
- David Lochary as Art Linkletter
- Mary Vivian Pearce as Lois Foerster Linkletter

== Background ==
John Waters stated in a 2015 interview with the British Film Institute that the short is the worst of his works, and that The Diane Linkletter Story was ad-libbed and was really just a test of the camera the day it was filmed.

== See also ==
- List of American films of 1970
