= Channing Wilroy =

American film actor (born 1940)

Channing Wilroy (born November 8, 1940) is an American film actor who has appeared in seven films by John Waters. His first film role was the character Channing, the manservant in the film Pink Flamingos. Because of his work with Waters, Wilroy is considered one of the Dreamlanders, Waters' ensemble of regular cast and crew members.

Prior to appearing in the films of John Waters, he was a regular on The Buddy Deane Show for three years.

He lives in Provincetown, Massachusetts and runs an inn.

== Filmography ==
- Pink Flamingos (1972) as Channing the Butler
- Female Trouble (1974) as Prosecuting Lawyer
- Desperate Living (1977) as Lieutenant Wilson
- Pecker (1998) as Wiseguy neighbor
- Divine Trash (1998) (himself)
- Cecil B. DeMented (2000) as Shop steward
- In Bad Taste (2000) (TV) (himself)
- A Dirty Shame (2004) as Irate motorist
- All the Dirt on 'A Dirty Shame' (2005) (Himself)

=== Other ===
- The Buddy Deane Show (1957) (TV series)
- Cry-Baby (1990) (music consultant)
