= Mary Vivian Pearce =

American actress

- Born: November 9, 1947 (age 78)
- Other name: Bonnie Pearce
- Occupation: Actress
- Years active: 1964–present
- Known for: Dreamlanders

Mary Vivian Pearce (born November 9, 1947) is an American actress. She has worked primarily in the films of John Waters.

== Life and career ==
Pearce is a childhood best friend of Waters and has appeared as an actress in all of his films. Because of her work with Waters, she is considered one of the Dreamlanders, Waters's ensemble of regular cast and crew members. Along with Mink Stole and Pat Moran, she is one of only three actors to appear in all of his feature films to date. She holds the additional distinction of having appeared in all of Waters's early short films, making her the only performer to appear in every film Waters has ever made. Pearce is always credited by her real name, but in her personal life, she is known as Bonnie. Her first film with Waters, in 1964, was a 17-minute independent short film called Hag in a Black Leather Jacket. The film was never released. In the rest of Waters's films, she's played both main and bit parts.

Her most famous roles were in Waters's Mondo Trasho, Multiple Maniacs, Pink Flamingos, Female Trouble and Desperate Living. However, as the years progressed, Pearce appeared less and less in Waters's films, usually as an extra or a character without a major impact on the plot. She continues to appear in Waters' films; she appeared as a protester in Cecil B. Demented just weeks after brain surgery.

== Personal life ==
At the age of eighteen, Pearce was married to a jockey who worked at Saratoga. In an interview with Gerald Peary, Pearce explained that she left for Provincetown to live with Waters and his then-girlfriend, Mona Montgomery:

I was 18, and it was three months after I got married. My husband was a jockey at Saratoga, and he told my father I'd left him and run off with beatniks. I was so pissed at him for telling! As far as I was concerned, it was a fake marriage to get me out of the house. I'd taken all our wedding presents back and bought books and records.

Pearce's alma mater is Goucher College. She has a graduate degree in creative writing. She lives in Baltimore, Maryland, with her sister and brother-in-law.

== Filmography ==
- Hag in a Black Leather Jacket (1964) as Bodie green dancer
- Roman Candles (1966) Woman Attacked by Fan
- Eat Your Makeup (1968) as a Kidnapped model
- Mondo Trasho (1969) as The Bombshell
- The Diane Linkletter Story (1969) as Mrs. Linkletter
- Multiple Maniacs (1970) as Bonnie/Cavalcade Patron
- Pink Flamingos (1972) as Cotton
- Female Trouble (1974) as Donna Dasher
- Desperate Living (1977) as Princess Coo Coo
- Polyester (1981) as Nun in unwed mothers home
- Hairspray (1988) as Hairhopper Mother
- Cry-Baby (1990) as Picnic Mother (scene later removed)
- Serial Mom (1994) as Book Buyer
- Pecker (1998) as Homophobe
- Divine Trash (1998) as herself
- Cecil B. DeMented (2000) as Family Lady
- A Dirty Shame (2004) as Non-judgmental sex addict at meeting
- I Am Divine (2013) as herself
- Squirrel (2017) as Mrs. Mueller an evil high school principal
