= Diane Linkletter =

Daughter of Art Linkletter (1948–1969)

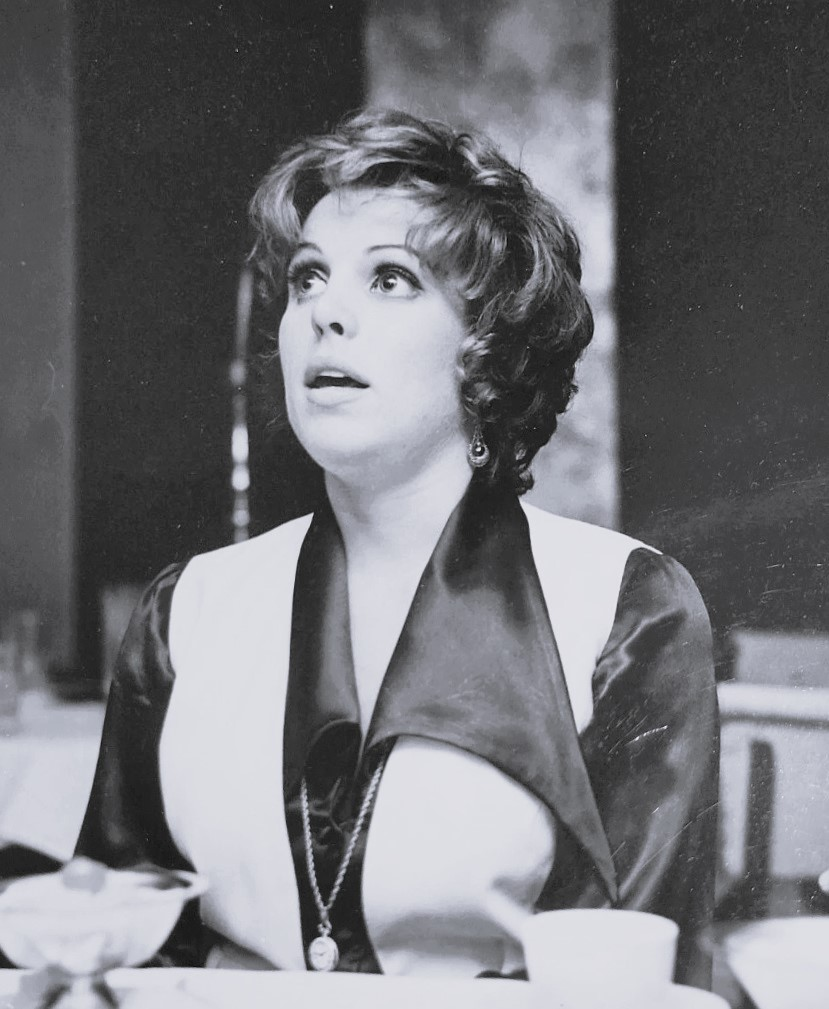
- Linkletter in 1969
- Born: October 31, 1948; Los Angeles County, California, US
- Died: October 4, 1969 (aged 20); West Hollywood, California, US
- Cause of death: Suicide
- Resting place: Forest Lawn Memorial Park; Hollywood Hills, Los Angeles
- Spouse: Grant Conroy (m. 1965; ann. 1965)
- Father: Art Linkletter
- Relatives: Jack Linkletter (brother)

Diane Linkletter (October 31, 1948 – October 4, 1969) was the daughter and youngest child of popular American media personality Art Linkletter and his wife, Lois Foerster. In 1969, she died by suicide at the age of 20.

== Background ==
Not widely known to the public before her death, Diane Linkletter was the youngest of five children born to Art Linkletter and Lois Foerster.

In 1965, 17-year-old Linkletter married 19-year-old Grant Conroy. Although Conroy had previously signed up for the Navy's NavCad program, the brief marriage offered a deferment from his draft notice for the Vietnam War; the marriage was quickly annulled and was not publicized, as both Linkletter's and Conroy's families wanted to keep the marriage quiet. Linkletter pursued a career in acting. She performed in summer stock, and in 1968 she appeared in a sketch on The Red Skelton Show, then traveled with her father to Europe to entertain servicemen's families.

== Death ==
At 9 a.m. on October 4, 1969, Linkletter jumped out of a window of her sixth-floor apartment at the Shoreham Towers in West Hollywood, California. She was first taken to Hollywood Receiving Hospital, then to LAC+USC Medical Center where she died of injuries she sustained in the fall. Her father blamed her death, which the media widely reported at the time, on drug use, specifically LSD.

Edward Durston, the last person known to have seen Linkletter alive, said that he had attempted to grab her, but she had jumped over the balcony. Durston was also the last person to see the actress Carol Wayne alive 16 years later, who disappeared after an argument with him.

The day after Linkletter's death, Art Linkletter held a press conference where he stated that his daughter's death "wasn't a suicide. She was not herself. She was murdered by the people who manufacture and distribute LSD." He also stated that Linkletter had used LSD in the six months prior to her death and the two discussed a "bum trip" she had experienced. Although Linkletter had not spoken to Diane in the last twenty-four hours of her life, he believed that she had taken LSD the night before her death and had experienced another bad trip which caused her to leap to her death.

A police investigation was launched to determine the events surrounding Linkletter's death. Police questioned Edward Durston, who said that Linkletter had phoned him the night before her death and "was very upset" and asked him to come over. He went to Linkletter's apartment at around 3 a.m., and the two stayed up all night talking. He said that Linkletter's behavior was "extremely emotional, extremely despondent and very irrational at times, in fact most of the time."

== Aftermath ==
In 1970, Art and Diane Linkletter won the 1970 Grammy Award for Best Spoken Word Recording for their record "We Love You, Call Collect". The record, which was released in November 1969—just a few weeks after her death—sold 275,000 copies in eight weeks, peaking at #42 on the Billboard Hot 100. According to Art Linkletter, royalties from the sales went "to combat problems arising from drug abuse."

== In popular culture ==
- John Waters' 1970 short film The Diane Linkletter Story is a fictionalized account of the suicide.
- In David Foster Wallace's 2011 posthumous novel The Pale King, an Internal Revenue Service officer recounting his recreational drug use in the 1970s before joining the Service states that "personally psychedelics frightened me, mostly because of what I remembered happening to Art Linkletter's daughter—my parents had been very into watching Art Linkletter in my childhood."
