= Dreamlanders =

John Waters acting group

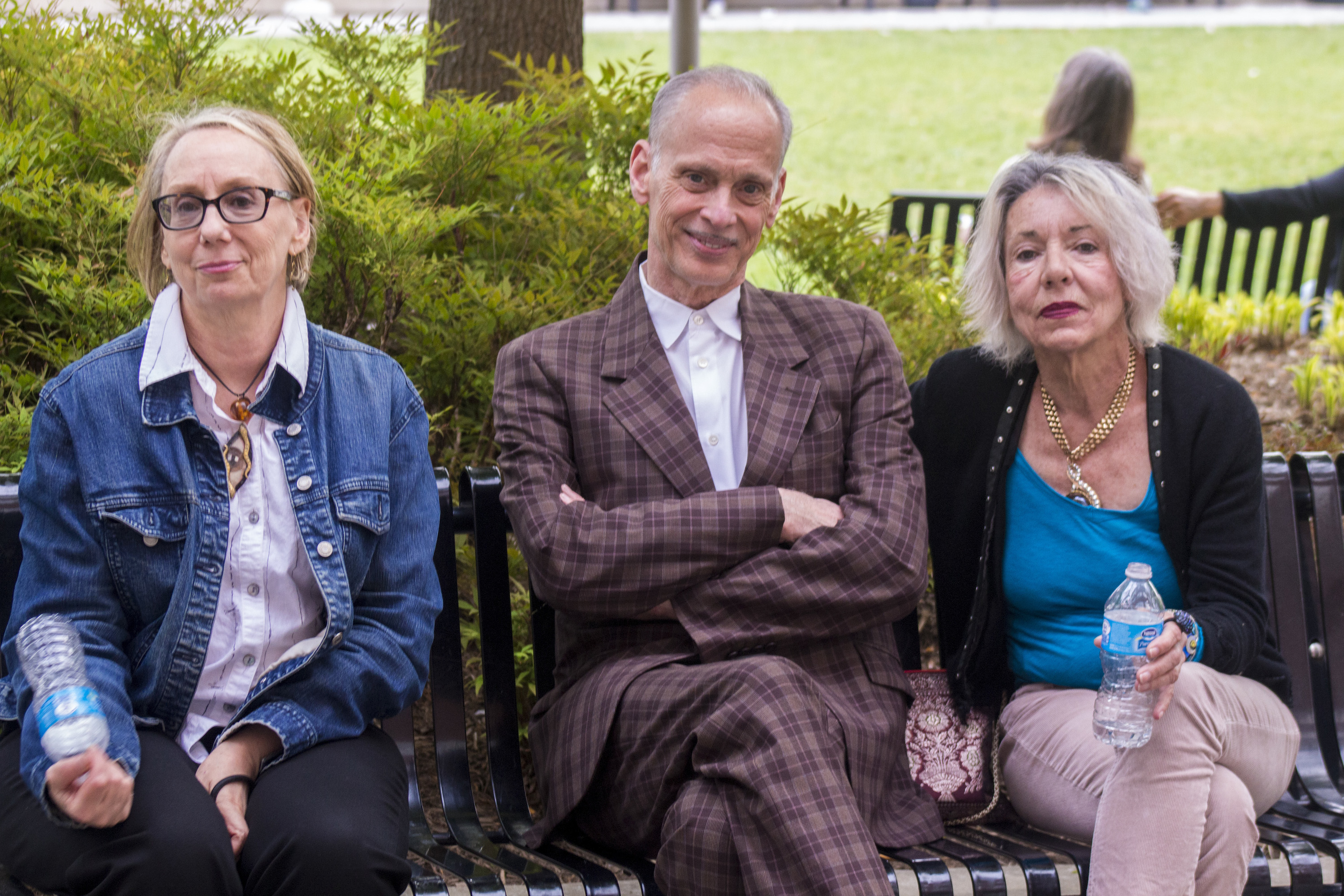
Dreamlanders members Mink Stole, John Waters and Susan Lowe in 2014

Dreamlanders are the cast and crew of regulars whom John Waters has used in his films. The term comes from the name of Waters's production company, Dreamland Productions.

Many of the original Dreamlanders were friends of Waters from his native Baltimore, Maryland. They included the "bad suburban kids" he knew from Towson and Lutherville: Bob Skidmore, Mark Isherwood, and Mary Vivian Pearce. This crowd was drawn to downtown Baltimore by the gay scene, where Divine introduced Waters to David Lochary.

== History ==
The original Dreamlanders also included denizens of the Fells Point neighborhood where Waters's art director, Vincent Peranio, a recent graduate of Maryland Institute College of Art, had rented an industrial space that once housed a commercial bakery with seven other Maryland Institute graduates, to use as cheap studio and living space. They called it the Hollywood Bakery. In Fells Point, the Dreamlanders were regular customers at Pete's Hotel, Bertha's, and Jimmy's. In addition to Peranio, the Fells Point Dreamlanders included Mink Stole, George Figgs, Bob Adams, Susan Lowe, Paul Swift, Chris Mason, and Peter Koper.

Although Waters has attempted to include many of the same actors and production team members in every film, not every Dreamlander is used in each of his films. This is frequently the result of the death of an actor, as was the case with Maelcum Soul, Edith Massey, Divine, and David Lochary. Other actors such as Jean Hill and Ricki Lake have not been used in every film, but appear occasionally.

Typically Waters would discover an actor and continue to use them in subsequent films. Most notably, Mary Vivian Pearce is the only Dreamlander to appear in every one of Waters's films, although her scenes in Cry-Baby were cut. Mink Stole has appeared in all of Waters's feature films, but does not appear in the early short films Hag in a Black Leather Jacket (1964), Eat Your Makeup (1967), and The Diane Linkletter Story (1969). Although many Dreamlanders have a prolific history with Waters, the distinction of being a Dreamlander is generally bequested upon anyone who has made more than one Waters film, such as Traci Lords who appeared in Cry-Baby (1990) and Serial Mom (1994). Danny Mills is sometimes considered a Dreamlander despite only appearing in the 1972 film Pink Flamingos.

== The Dreamlanders ==
Dreamlanders appearances in John Waters films
Actor and/or Crew	Mondo Trasho	Multiple Maniacs	Pink Flamingos	Female Trouble	Desperate Living	Polyester	Hairspray	Cry-Baby	Serial Mom	Pecker	Cecil B. Demented	A Dirty Shame
Divine	Yes	Yes	Yes	Yes		Yes	Yes					
David Lochary	Yes	Yes	Yes	Yes								
Susan Lowe	Yes	Yes		Yes	Yes	Yes	Yes	Yes	Yes	Yes	Yes	
Edith Massey		Yes	Yes	Yes	Yes	Yes						
Cookie Mueller		Yes	Yes	Yes	Yes	Yes						
Mary Vivian Pearce	Yes	Yes	Yes	Yes	Yes	Yes	Yes	Yes	Yes	Yes	Yes	Yes
Channing Wilroy			Yes	Yes	Yes			Yes		Yes	Yes	Yes
Jean Hill					Yes	Yes						Yes
Mink Stole	Yes	Yes	Yes	Yes	Yes	Yes	Yes	Yes	Yes	Yes	Yes	Yes
Susan Walsh	Yes	Yes	Yes	Yes								
Paul Swift		Yes	Yes	Yes	Yes							
George Figgs	Yes	Yes	Yes	Yes	Yes	Yes			Yes	Yes	Yes	Yes
Elizabeth Coffey			Yes	Yes	Yes		Yes					
George Stover				Yes	Yes	Yes	Yes					
Patty Hearst								Yes	Yes	Yes	Yes	Yes
Pat Moran	Yes	Yes	Yes	Yes	Yes	Yes	Yes	Yes	Yes	Yes	Yes	Yes
Ed Peranio		Yes	Yes	Yes	Yes							
Vincent Peranio		Yes	Yes	Yes	Yes	Yes	Yes	Yes	Yes	Yes	Yes	Yes
Van Smith			Yes	Yes	Yes	Yes	Yes	Yes	Yes	Yes	Yes	Yes
Steve Yeager			Yes	Yes	Yes	Yes						
Ricki Lake							Yes	Yes	Yes		Yes	Yes
Holter Graham							Yes	Yes				
Traci Lords								Yes	Yes			
Bess Armstrong									Yes	Yes		
Bob Skidmore	Yes	Yes	Yes							Yes		
Mark Isherwood	Yes	Yes	Yes									
