= David Lochary =

American actor

- Born: David Crawford Lochary; August 21, 1944; Baltimore, Maryland, U.S.
- Died: July 29, 1977 (aged 32); New York City, U.S.
- Occupation: Actor
- Years active: 1966–1977

David Crawford Lochary (August 21, 1944 – July 29, 1977) was an American actor. He is best known as a member of the Dreamlanders, the ensemble of regular actors and crew members used in the films of director John Waters.

== Biography ==
Lochary was the son of Dean and Mary Eileen (née McMahan) Lochary. (Note: Lochary's mother Mary was featured in two of Waters' films: Multiple Maniacs and Female Trouble. Donald Lochary, David's elder brother, died in July 2019; he also played a small, uncredited role in Female Trouble.) He starred in such films as Pink Flamingos, Female Trouble, and Multiple Maniacs, in which he typically played exotically dressed, sophisticated perverts. Lochary co-wrote The Diane Linkletter Story with Divine, and worked as an uncredited hair and makeup artist on many of Waters' films. Lochary met Divine at beauty school and used to style his wigs and makeup for parties. Divine later commented that he had "never even heard the word 'drag' before David."

Following the success of Pink Flamingos, Lochary moved from Baltimore to New York City to pursue acting. According to Robert Maier, Lochary struggled to find roles in New York and began to abuse drugs. In 1977, Lochary died as a result of a PCP overdose.

Lochary was gay, and dated singer John Condon in the 1970s.

== Filmography ==
Year	Title	Role	Notes
1966	Roman Candles	Reading Man	
1968	Eat Your Makeup	Governess' Boyfriend	
1969	Mondo Trasho	Asylum Inmate, Dr. Coathanger, Voice of Snob #2	Also production assistant and makeup artist for Divine (uncredited)
1970	The Diane Linkletter Story	Art Linkletter	Also writer
1970	Multiple Maniacs	Mr. David	Also production assistant
1972	Pink Flamingos	Raymond Marble	Also hair stylist (uncredited)
1974	Female Trouble	Donald Dasher	Also hair stylist (uncredited)
1998	Divine Trash	Himself	Posthumous release; documentary; archive footage
2000	In Bad Taste	Himself	Posthumous release; documentary; archive footage
2013	I Am Divine	Himself	Posthumous release; documentary; archive footage
