= Paul Swift =

American actor

- Screenshot of Swift from the documentary film Divine Trash (1998) directed by Steve Yeager.
- Born: August 18, 1934
- Died: October 7, 1994 (aged 60) Baltimore, Maryland, U.S.
- Occupation: Actor
- Years active: 1970–1977

Paul Swift (August 18, 1934 – October 7, 1994) was an American actor.

== Career ==
Between 1970 and 1977 he appeared in roles in four of the early feature films directed by John Waters. He additionally appeared as himself in two Waters-related documentary films. Swift's most notable role is his appearance as "The Egg Man" in Pink Flamingos (1972). Aside from that, he played mostly bit parts.

== Personal life ==
According to 2018 article in the Baltimore Sun, Paul Swift was openly gay.

== Death ==
Swift died of complications from AIDS, aged 60, in his native Baltimore.

== Filmography ==
| Year | Title | Role | Notes |
|---|---|---|---|
| 1970 | Multiple Maniacs | Steve (Cookie's boyfriend) | |
| 1972 | Pink Flamingos | The Egg Man | |
| 1974 | Female Trouble | Butterfly | |
| 1976 | Edith's Shopping Bag | himself | |
| 1977 | Desperate Living | Mr. Paul | (final film role) |
| 1998 | Divine Trash | himself | archive footage |
