= Liarmouth =

2022 novel by John Waters

Liarmouth: A Feel-Bad Romance
- First edition cover
- Author: John Waters
- Audio read by: John Waters
- Language: English
- Publisher: Farrar, Straus and Giroux
- Publication date: May 3, 2022
- Media type: Print (hardcover and paperback), e-book, audiobook
- Pages: 256 pp.
- ISBN: 978-0-374-18572-5 (First edition hardcover)
- OCLC: 1264272355
- Dewey Decimal: 813/.54
- LC Class: PS3573.A8174 L53 2022

Liarmouth: A Feel-Bad Romance is the debut novel by John Waters, published on May 3, 2022, by Farrar, Straus and Giroux.

== Plot ==
Con artist and thief Marsha "Liarmouth" Sprinkle orchestrates a heist at the Baltimore/Washington International Airport with her partner in crime Daryl, to whom she has promised sex once a year. They are caught during their luggage theft scheme and are separated. They continue their thieving ways apart, and Daryl's penis starts talking. Liarmouth is also estranged from her mother, Adora, who operates a cosmetic surgery business for pets. Her daughter, Poppy, is the leader of a trampoline park outside Baltimore, where she and her posse of adult trampoline fanatics find therapeutic release in bouncing nonstop. After Marsha turns up and steals their money, Poppy decides she must kill her mother. Liarmouth then steals from her mother, and a chase ensues with the three women coming to Provincetown, Massachusetts, for a family reunion of sorts.

== Style ==
The novel is characterized by a loose plot, which according to The New York Times "unfurls as a tangled ribbon of manic events untouched by the logic of cause and effect". It is also defined by Waters' absurd and vulgar style of humor, represented in its physical gags and slapstick elements.

== Reception ==
Publishers Weekly called the work "hilariously sleazy" and praised Waters for sustaining humor throughout. Molly Young of The New York Times praised Waters' brand of "weirdo" hyberbole, and felt he made a rare achievement in that "every character thinks and speaks exactly like the author", and to success. Henry Bankhead of Library Journal deemed it "nothing short of stunningly outrageous—a nonstop smorgasbord of theft, deceit, and rancor fueled by an unrelenting, unabashedly sexualized comic genius".

== Abandoned film adaptation ==
In October 2022, Deadline announced that Village Roadshow Pictures optioned the novel for a film adaptation, with Waters set to write the screenplay and direct. It was to have been Waters' first directorial effort since A Dirty Shame (2004).

In February 2024, a film blog reported that Aubrey Plaza had been cast as Marsha Sprinkle and the film would begin shooting in the mid-year. Waters initially stated that this was untrue, saying he would be happy to have Plaza play the role, but that no plans for production had yet been set. However, in April 2024, Waters confirmed Plaza's casting, but also said that while executives liked his script for the adaptation, they did not have the budget available to make it as of yet. In November 2024, Waters told the Houston Chronicle that the film was no longer in development.
