= Eat Your Makeup =

- Directed by: John Waters
- Written by: John Waters
- Produced by: John Waters
- Starring: Maelcum Soul; David Lochary; Divine
- Cinematography: John Waters
- Edited by: John Waters
- Distributed by: Dreamland
- Release date: February 23, 1968
- Running time: 45 minutes
- Country: United States

Eat Your Makeup is a 1968 short film directed by John Waters, starring Marina Melin, Divine, Mary Vivian Pearce, David Lochary, Howard Gruber, and Maelcum Soul.

It was John Waters' first film production to be shot on 16mm film; his prior films were shot on 8mm stock.

The film has never been shown commercially, or released on home video. However, since 2004, it has been screened occasionally as part of various John Waters touring art exhibitions.

== Plot ==
A deranged nanny (Maelcum Soul) kidnaps young girls and forces them to model themselves to death in front of her boyfriend (David Lochary) and their crazed friends. Highlights include one of the spectators (Divine) fantasizing that he is Jackie Kennedy and reliving the JFK assassination in his mind, and a starving model clawing her way up a sand dune while crying out.

== Cast ==
- Lizzy Temple Black as Girl Scout
- Maelcum Soul as Governess
- David Lochary as Governess' boyfriend
- Divine as Jackie Kennedy
- Howard Gruber as John F. Kennedy
- George Figgs as Prince Charming
- Marina Melin as Head kidnapped model
- Berenica Cipcus as Starving Model on Sand Dune
- Mona Montgomery as Kidnapped model
- Mary Vivian Pearce as Kidnapped model
- Bob Skidmore as Spectator
- Margie Skidmore as Spectator
- Ben Syfu as Spectator
- Otts Munderloh as the Chauffeur
- John Waters

== Release ==
The film was originally only released in a church basement but has been screened occasionally at Waters' art exhibits through the years.

== See also ==
- List of American films of 1968
