= Hag in a Black Leather Jacket =

1964 film by John Waters

- Directed by: John Waters
- Written by: John Waters
- Produced by: John Waters
- Starring: Mona Montgomery; Mary Vivian Pearce; John Waters
- Distributed by: Dreamland
- Release date: 1964
- Running time: 17 minutes
- Country: United States
- Language: English
- Budget: $30

Hag in a Black Leather Jacket is a 1964 short 8 mm film made in Baltimore, Maryland, by John Waters and starring Mona Montgomery and Mary Vivian Pearce. The film has no dialogue, with the only sound being piano accompaniment played by Waters' mother and scattered pop songs playing over the footage.

== Plot ==
A white ballerina (Mona Montgomery) is walking when a black man flirts with her leading to her getting in the car with him. Afterward, the black man climbs into a trash can and the ballerina takes a bath in full clothing.

On a rooftop, a Ku Klux Klansman performs the wedding. The wedding guests are played by people dressed in early pop-influenced costumes, American flags, tinfoil, and drag. Following the ceremony, Mary Vivian Pearce does a dance known as the Bodie Green. At the end of the film, the wedding guests drive off and dance.

== Cast ==
- Mona Montgomery as Ballerina/White Girl Bride
- Tricia Waters as Bridesmaid
- Mary Vivian Pearce as Bodie Green Dancer
- John Waters

== Production Notes ==
The entire film was shot in one take due to Waters' not knowing how to edit at the time. The short was originally only shown once at a "beatnik coffee house" where Waters did end up earning his $30 budget back. The stock for the film was stolen by the lead of the film and Waters' then-girlfriend, Mona Montgomery.

== Production and availability ==
It was a "no budget film" that cost $30 to make and runs 17 minutes.

In 2004–2005, it was seen in John Waters: Change of Life as part of Waters' traveling photography exhibit. In September 2014, it was shown as part of the "Fifty Years of John Waters" retrospective at the Film Society of Lincoln Center in New York City.
