= Mondo Trasho =

- VHS cover
- Directed by: John Waters
- Written by: John Waters
- Produced by: John Waters
- Starring: Mary Vivian Pearce; Divine; David Lochary; Mink Stole
- Cinematography: John Waters
- Edited by: John Waters
- Music by: John Waters
- Production company: Dreamland
- Distributed by: Film-Makers' Cooperative
- Release date: March 14, 1969
- Running time: 95 minutes
- Country: United States
- Language: English
- Budget: $2,100

Mondo Trasho is a 1969 American 16mm mondo black comedy film by John Waters. The film stars Divine, Mary Vivian Pearce, David Lochary and Mink Stole. It contains very little dialogue, the story being told mostly through musical cues.

== Plot ==
After an introductory sequence during which chickens are beheaded on a chopping block, the main action begins. Platinum blond bombshell Mary Vivian Pearce begins her day by riding the bus and reading Kenneth Anger's Hollywood Babylon.

Bombshell is later seduced by a hippie degenerate "shrimper" (foot fetishist), who starts molesting her feet while she fantasizes about being Cinderella. She is then hit by a car driven by Divine, a portly blonde who was trying to pick up an attractive hitchhiker whom she imagines naked.

Divine places Bombshell in the car and drives to a thrift store where she steals clothes for her and later steals shoes from a dead homeless woman.

The Bombshell is then brought to a coin laundry where Divine cleans her face up with a wipe and changes her into the clothes she stole. Divine is then visited by the Blessed Virgin Mary (Margie Skidmore)—during which Divine exclaims, "Oh Mary ... teach me to be Divine". Divine is then gifted a wheelchair by Mary which she uses to wheel the unconscious Bombshell around.

When Divine returns to her car she is in shock to see that it has been stolen by a man in sunglasses. While trying to take a detour to the doctor's, Divine and the bombshell are then captured in a violent asylum.

At the asylum, Divine is robbed of a cigarette and watches in disgust as a topless tap dancer gets sexually assaulted before the Virgin Mary visits her again, this time giving her a hunting knife. After seeing the miracle, the inmates break out of the asylum and flee happily into Baltimore

Divine finally takes the unconscious Bombshell to Dr. Coathanger and his dangerously ill nurse, who amputate her feet and replace them with bird-like monster feet which she can tap together to transport herself around Baltimore.

Meanwhile, Divine is interrogated by a reporter which she shows disdain to until the camera starts taking photos. She is then beaten by a member of the police, which leads to a gunfight between him and many bystanders. Divine throws a lamp at the police officer and wrestles with the officer until she kills him, accidentally stabbing herself in the stomach in the process. After Dr. Coathanger tries to abduct a high school girl, he drops the Bombshell and Divine in the woods but as she is about to succumb to her wounds, she is taken and "granted divinity," by Virgin Mary.

The Bombshell then travels across Baltimore with her bird feet, which leads to her being mooned by greasers in an alley and being repeatedly insulted by two snobs.

== Cast ==
- Mary Vivian Pearce as The Bombshell / Cinderella
- Divine as Divine / Greaser in Alley
- David Lochary as Asylum Inmate / Dr. Coathanger / Voice of Snob #2
- Mink Stole as Homeless Woman / Asylum Inmate / Snob #1
- John Leisenring as The Hippie Foot Fetishist / Prince Charming
- Bob Skidmore as Asylum Personnel / Policeman
- Margie Skidmore as Shocked Mother in Park / The Virgin Mary
- Berenica Cipcus as Evil Stepsister #1 / Asylum Inmate / Dr. Coathanger's Nurse
- Chris Atkinson
- Lizzy Temple Black as The Virgin Mary's Assistant
- Mark Isherwood as The Hitchhiker
- George Figgs as Asylum Inmate / Man in Waiting Room
- Susan Lowe as Asylum Inmate
- Marina Melin as Asylum Inmate
- Rick Morrow as News Photographer
- Mimi Lochary as Snob #2
- Pat Moran as Dr. Coathanger's secretary
- Bob Walsh as Shocked Laundromat Patron
- Susan Walsh (uncredited) as Shocked Laundromat Patron
- John Waters as Reporter (voice)
- Patricia Waters as Little Girl
- Rip Quinn as Jacob Ross

== Production ==
Depending on versions of the story; either Waters or the whole crew (except Divine) was either arrested or nearly arrested during production for illegally shooting a scene involving a nude hitchhiker on the campus of Johns Hopkins University. However, according to contemporary newspaper accounts, only one person was immediately arrested, actor Mark P. Isherwood. Charged sometime later were John Waters, Nancy Stoll, David C. Lochary and Mary V. Pearce, all five for indecent exposure, but the charges were eventually dropped.

=== Title ===
The film's title refers to a series of semi-related quasi-documentary films that were popular during the 1960s: Mondo Cane, Mondo Freudo, Mondo Bizarro, etc. The title also pays tribute to Mondo Topless, a film by one of Waters's favorite directors, Russ Meyer.

=== Music ===
Waters, in a 2008 interview, stated that the songs used in the film were taken right out of his own record collection. Waters says he did not pay the proper licensing fees to use these songs because he could not afford to. It is because of this, Waters says, that Mondo Trasho remains out of distribution, as the still-unsecured music rights would be too prohibitively expensive to clear.

== Reception ==
Waters stated that upon Mondo Trasho's release, it received "some national attention," namely by The Cockettes who Divine performed with after the film's release.

Mondo Trasho currently holds a 43% approval rating on Rotten Tomatoes, based on seven reviews.

== Background ==
Waters himself has stated that he does not care for this movie. In an interview with British Film Institute Waters said it should have been a short film instead of a feature but was a feature-length due to being influenced by films such as Andy Warhol's experimental film Sleep.

== Home media ==
The film was only produced in 1984 on a 95-minute R-rated VHS with hi-fi mono sound in black and white by Cinema Group Home Video.

In an interview with the Harvard Book Store in Cambridge, Massachusetts, on tour for his book release of Mr Know-It-All: The Tarnished Wisdom of a Filth Elder (2019), Waters stated that Mondo Trasho would never get released again due to copyright issues with the music and that it would cost $1 million just to secure rights for the music.

== See also ==
- List of American films of 1969
