= Divine Trash =

1998 documentary film by Steve Yeager

- DVD cover
- Directed by: Steve Yeager
- Produced by: Steve Yeager; Cindy Miller
- Starring: Steve Yeager; John Waters; The Dreamlanders; Steve Buscemi
- Cinematography: Steve Yeager
- Edited by: Steve Yeager
- Music by: Don Barto
- Distributed by: Fox Lorber
- Release date: January 18, 1998
- Running time: 97 minutes
- Country: United States
- Language: English
- Budget: $10,000
- Box office: $39,842

Divine Trash is a 1998 American documentary film directed by Steve Yeager about the life and work of filmmaker John Waters, and the making of the 1972 film Pink Flamingos, which is written and directed by Waters and stars Divine.

Divine Trash premiered at the 1998 Sundance Film Festival, where it won Yeager the Filmmakers Trophy for Best Documentary.

== Cast ==
- Steve Yeager
- John Waters
- Robert Shaye
- Mink Stole
- Divine (archive footage)
- David Lochary (archive footage)
- Edith Massey (archive footage)
- Herschell Gordon Lewis
- Danny Mills
- Mary Vivian Pearce
- Vincent Peranio
- Paul Swift
- John Pierson
- Hal Hartley
- Steve Buscemi
- Jim Jarmusch
- Channing Wilroy
- Mary Avara
- David O. Russell
- Paul Morrissey
- Jonas Mekas
- George Kuchar
- Mike Kuchar
- Ken Jacobs

== Release ==
Divine Trash had its premiere at the 1998 Sundance Film Festival in Utah, where it won Yeager the Filmmakers Trophy for Best Documentary. Following its Sundance premiere, Yeager re-cut the film in order to excise roughly eight minutes of footage from films and television programs for which he had not secured the usage rights; after being re-edited, Divine Trash screened at the Senator Theatre in Baltimore, Maryland, on May 5, 1998.

== Reception ==
On the review aggregator website Rotten Tomatoes, the film has an approval rating of 80 percent based on five reviews, with an average rating of 6.9/10.
