= Cecil B. Demented =

2000 film by John Waters

- Theatrical release poster
- Directed by: John Waters
- Written by: John Waters
- Produced by: John Fiedler; Joe Caracciolo Jr.; Mark Tarlov
- Starring: Melanie Griffith; Stephen Dorff; Alicia Witt; Adrian Grenier; Larry Gilliard Jr.; Mink Stole; Ricki Lake; Patricia Hearst; Kevin Nealon
- Cinematography: Robert Stevens
- Edited by: Jeffrey Wolf
- Music by: Zoë Poledouris; Basil Poledouris
- Production companies: Polar Entertainment; Le Studio Canal+
- Distributed by: Artisan Entertainment (United States); BAC Films (France)
- Release dates: May 17, 2000 (Cannes); August 2, 2000 (France); August 11, 2000 (United States)
- Running time: 88 minutes
- Countries: United States; France
- Language: English
- Budget: $10 million
- Box office: $2 million

Cecil B. Demented is a 2000 black comedy film written and directed by John Waters. The film stars Melanie Griffith as a snobby A-list Hollywood actress who is kidnapped by a band of terrorist filmmakers; they force her to star in their underground film. Stephen Dorff stars as the eponymous character and leader of the group, with Alicia Witt, Adrian Grenier, Maggie Gyllenhaal, and Michael Shannon co-starring as the rest of his gang of filmmakers.

The film, whose title (also the name of Dorff's character) alludes to director Cecil B. DeMille, is loosely based on the 1974 kidnapping of Patricia Hearst, who has a cameo role. Like all of Waters' films, it was shot in Baltimore, Maryland. The film was given a limited theatrical release in the United States on August 11, 2000, by Artisan Entertainment.

== Plot ==
Hollywood A-list actress Honey Whitlock publicly presents herself as a sweet and considerate woman, but is actually a profane, unreasonable, and demanding diva. While in Baltimore to attend a premiere for her latest film, Honey is kidnapped by manic film director Cecil B. Demented and his band of misfit, Andy Warhol–worshiping artists who have branded themselves "outlaw filmmakers", known collectively as the "Sprocket Holes". Each of the Sprocket Holes has infiltrated the staff of the theater where the premiere is to take place; they subsequently kidnap Honey as she concludes her speech on stage. In the ensuing mayhem, the group escapes.

Honey is taken to an abandoned movie theater where she is kept gagged with tape on her mouth, tied up and blindfolded. Honey is introduced to Cecil's crew of followers, each of whom wears a tattoo of a noted filmmaker and reveals unique, individual quirks. Cecil explains that he wants to make his masterpiece film and needs Honey to star as the lead. At first, she resists, shooting scenes halfheartedly, but when Cecil demands better results, Honey gives an over-the-top performance in the film's opening scene which pleases him. Apart from the first scene, Cecil, Honey and the crew roam around the city filming scenes at real (unapproved) locations, often involving innocent bystanders in the process.

The group's first location is a movie theater playing Patch Adams: The Director's Cut, which they storm with guns and smoke bombs before leaving with their footage. Several bystanders note in interviews that Honey seems younger and cooler than in her recent Hollywood films, but a spokesman for the Baltimore Film Commission "says no to cinema terrorism". Inspired, Cecil decides to invade the luncheon the commission is hosting. The group crashes the event and Cecil orders Honey to jump off the roof of a nearby building, which she does without safety measures. A gunfight ensues between Cecil's crew and the police, during which hairdresser Rodney is killed, and Cecil is wounded. Honey uses the opportunity to turn herself in to the authorities and they take her away in a police car, but the film group retrieves her soon afterward.

As Honey seems to become more comfortable with her situation, possibly developing Stockholm syndrome, she watches a television special discussing her disappearance. People who knew her, including her ex-husband, are interviewed and come clean about how mean-spirited she was in daily life. Honey now realizes that her desire to escape would only lead her back to Hollywood, where she is hated for being rude. She resists the idea of joining Cecil's followers but soon reconsiders and declares herself "Demented forever", having her arm branded and officially joining the motley crew.

The Sprocket Holes then invade the set of the Forrest Gump sequel being filmed in Baltimore, at Honey's suggestion. Upon arrival, they subdue and replace many of the film's crew. A gunfight breaks out between Cecil's cohorts and Teamsters who got free. Members of Cecil's crew are either killed or wounded. The surviving Sprocket Holes and Honey flee to a nearby pornographic theater and seek refuge inside. The audience helps Cecil escape.

At their last location, Cecil is shooting the final scene at a local drive-in while law enforcement are alerted. Cecil and the crew invade the projection room, and he proceeds to excite the crowd into a frenzy. He asks Honey to light her hair on fire for the final shot, which she does. With the film finished, the Sprocket Holes start having sex in public before the authorities step in. Cecil sets himself completely ablaze as police arrive, to give Honey a chance to escape. In the ensuing chaos, some crew members escape with the raw film footage while others are shot. Taken into custody, Honey is surprised and pleased by the new affection that the crowd has shown to her as she is led into a police van.

== Cast ==
- Melanie Griffith as Honey Whitlock
- Stephen Dorff as Sinclair Stevens / Cecil B. Demented, the director (Otto Preminger)*
- Alicia Witt as Cherish, the actress (Andy Warhol)*
- Adrian Grenier as Lyle, the actor (Herschell Gordon Lewis)*
- Larry Gilliard Jr. as Lewis, the art director (David Lynch)*
- Maggie Gyllenhaal as Raven, the makeup artist (Kenneth Anger)*
- Jack Noseworthy as Rodney, the hair stylist (Pedro Almodóvar)*
- Mink Stole as Mrs. Sylvia Mallory
- Ricki Lake as Libby, Honey's publicist
- Patricia Hearst as Fidget's mother
- Mike Shannon as Petie, the driver (Rainer Werner Fassbinder)*
- Kevin Nealon as himself
- Eric M. Barry as Fidget, the costume designer (William Castle)*
- Zenzele Uzoma as Chardonnay, the sound artist (Spike Lee)*
- Erika Lynn Rupli as Pam, the cinematographer (Sam Peckinpah)*
- Harriet Dodge as Dinah, the producer (Sam Fuller)*
- Roseanne Barr as herself
- Eric Roberts as Honey's ex-husband
- Jeffrey Wei as William "Little William"
- Channing Wilroy as shop steward
- John Waters as reporter (uncredited)

* Denotes the director name tattooed on the character.

== Soundtrack ==
The soundtrack was released August 8, 2000, by RCA Records.

1. "Opening Credit Theme" – Moby
2. "Nice Tranquil Thumbs in Mouth" – The Locust
3. "Bankable Bitch" – DJ Class and Teflon the Bull
4. "Upstart" – Meatjack
5. "Everyday" – Substance D
6. "No Budget" – DJ Class and Mayo
7. "Broadway Brouhaha"
8. "Loopy" – XXXBombshell
9. "An Extra Piece of Dead Meat" – The Locust
10. "Demented Forever" – Karen McMillan
11. "Seduction" – The Sex-o-Rama Band
12. "Ciao!" – Liberace
13. "Chow" – Jerome Dillon

== Release ==
The film was screened out of competition at the Cannes Film Festival on May 17, 2000. It was given a limited theatrical release in the United States on August 11, 2000, by Artisan Entertainment.

== Reception ==
=== Box office ===
Cecil B. Demented grossed $1.3 million in the United States and Canada, and $676,898 in other territories, for a worldwide total of $2 million, against an estimated budget of $10 million.

=== Critical response ===
On the review aggregator website Rotten Tomatoes, the film holds an approval rating of 52% based on 82 reviews, with an average rating of 5.6/10. The website's critics consensus reads, "The idea behind John Waters' latest has much potential, but the movie ends up being too sloppy and underdeveloped in terms of script and direction. Also, by today's standards, it fails to shock." Metacritic, which uses a weighted average, assigned the film a score of 57 out of 100, based on 32 critics, indicating "mixed or average" reviews.

Roger Ebert of the Chicago Sun-Times gave the film one and a half stars out of four, remarking that it was like "a home movie [with] a bunch of kids goofing off", while Peter Travers of Rolling Stone said, "DeMented is Waters the way we like him—spiked with laughs and served with a twist".

In more recent years, the film has been reappraised by some critics. In a 2020 review, A. S. Hamrah of The Baffler wrote, "Seen today, Cecil B. Demented is hilarious, cheap, and necessary. A series of low-budget set pieces, the film mocks all aspects of film production, bemoaning the loss of trash to blockbuster entertainment, exhorting young filmmakers across America to form queer families and blow things up." In a 2021 review, Will Sloan of Screen Slate wrote, "As a filmmaker, Waters's flaws and virtues are so densely intertwined as to be indistinguishable. His actors are mostly just mouthpieces for his ideas, but if you can accept a universe in which the baby-faced likes of Adrian Grenier, Alicia Witt, and Maggie Gyllenhaal can't stop talking about Pasolini, the ideas are as stimulating as ever." In a 2022 review, Scout Tafoya of RogerEbert.com wrote, "Cecil B. Demented may lack some of the immediacy of Waters' early experiments in transgression, but it's one of his most personal statements."

== See also ==
- List of American films of 2000
