= Multiple Maniacs =

1970 American film directed by John Waters

- Promotional release poster
- Directed by: John Waters
- Written by: John Waters
- Produced by: John Waters
- Starring: Divine; David Lochary; Mary Vivian Pearce; Mink Stole; Cookie Mueller; Edith Massey; George Figgs
- Cinematography: John Waters
- Edited by: John Waters
- Music by: John Waters
- Production company: Dreamland
- Distributed by: New Line Cinema
- Release date: April 10, 1970 (Baltimore)
- Running time: 96 minutes
- Country: United States
- Language: English
- Budget: $5,000
- Box office: $33,036

Multiple Maniacs is a 1970 independent American black comedy film composed, shot, edited, written, produced, and directed by John Waters, as his second feature film and first "talkie". It features several actors who were part of the Dreamland acting troupe for Waters' films, including Divine, Mary Vivian Pearce, David Lochary, Mink Stole, Edith Massey, George Figgs, and Cookie Mueller. The plot follows a traveling troupe of sideshow freaks who rob their unsuspecting audience members.

A major restoration received national exhibition in August 2016, after initially screening in June at the Provincetown Film Festival.

== Plot ==
Lady Divine is the owner and operator of the Cavalcade of Perversion, a traveling freak show of various perversions, fetish acts, and obscenities, such as the "Puke Eater". The show is free, but the various performers must persuade and even physically drag reluctant passersby to attend.

At the finale to every show, Lady Divine appears and robs the patrons at gunpoint. This arrangement seems successful to Mr. David, Lady Divine's lover, but Lady Divine becomes bored with the routine and decides to murder the patrons rather than merely robbing them. After escaping the murder scene, she comes home to Cookie, her prostitute daughter, and her new boyfriend Steve, a member of the Weather Underground.

Lady Divine receives a call from Edith, proprietor of the local bar, who informs her that Mr. David had been at her bar with another woman. Lady Divine heads there to catch them, but is raped on the way by two glue-sniffers. Meanwhile, Mr. David and his new lover Bonnie, a woman who desperately wants to be part of the troupe, engage in sex acts at the home he shares with Lady Divine, during which Bonnie anally penetrates him with a dildo.

While Lady Divine contemplates her rape, the Infant of Prague appears and leads her to a church. Making her way uncertainly into the church, Lady Divine prays, but is then approached and seduced by a strange young woman named Mink. They have a sexual encounter in the church pew, with Mink inserting a rosary in Divine's rectum while describing the Stations of the Cross.

Now lesbian lovers, Lady Divine and Mink go to Edith's bar with the intent to kill Mr. David and his mistress, but they are too late: David and Bonnie, who have by this time decided that they have to kill Lady Divine to protect themselves, have left.

Mr. David returns to Cookie's house, intent on killing Divine, but instead he finds Cookie and fellow Cavalcade performer Ricky there. An argument ensues, and Bonnie accidentally kills Cookie. They tie up Ricky and hide Cookie's corpse just before Divine and Mink return. When Bonnie tries to shoot Lady Divine, Divine attacks and kills her with a knife. She then turns on Mr. David and eviscerates him as well, cannibalizing his internal organs, and becoming even more frenzied. Ricky suddenly surprises Mink, who shoots him. In a fit of anger, Divine accuses Mink of betrayal and fatally stabs her before uttering, "Oh, Divine! And now you're a maniac." Divine becomes even more crazed upon finding Cookie's body hidden behind the couch.

Exhausted from the ordeal, Lady Divine collapses on a couch and is subsequently raped by a giant lobster. In the aftermath, she destroys a car, then wanders Baltimore trying to kill anyone she can. The National Guard appear, surround Lady Divine on the street, and shoot her dead, to the tune of "America the Beautiful".

== Cast ==
- Divine as Lady Divine
- David Lochary as Mr. David
- Mary Vivian Pearce as Bonnie
- Mink Stole as Mink / The Religious Whore
- Cookie Mueller as Cookie Divine
- Edith Massey as Edith the Barmaid / Virgin Mary
- Rick Morrow as Ricky
- Paul Swift as Steve
- Michael Renner Jr. as The Infant of Prague
- George Figgs as Jesus Christ

== Production ==
=== Development ===
Waters has said he was influenced by Herschell Gordon Lewis's Two Thousand Maniacs! (1964) when writing the film, and the title Multiple Maniacs is a direct reference. The idea for "Lobstora"—the giant lobster that rapes Divine towards the end of the film—was derived from a combination of influences: Salvador Dalí; Jack Smith; a postcard for Provincetown, Massachusetts, that featured a lobster in the sky overlooking a beach; and taking LSD and cannabis.

=== Filming ===
Filming took place in Baltimore, Maryland. The scene in which Divine cannibalizes Mr. David's innards was accomplished using a cow's heart that Waters had purchased from a butcher two days prior and refrigerated. Lobstora was played by Vince Peranio and Peranio's brother in a papier-mâché costume.

== Themes ==
=== Queerness and trash ===
Waters, in a 2016 interview regarding the re-release of the film, quoted as saying "There was such a war going on then between the hippies and the straight world; and straight didn’t mean heterosexual... it meant you didn’t smoke pot or you didn’t think the revolution was going to happen." Multiple Maniacs has often been described as a camp movie. Guy Schaffer, a lecturer at Rensselaer Polytechnic Institute, describes camp aesthetics in queer cinema as a way of reappropriating and revaluing "trash" whilst still broadcasting the trashiness of what it glamorizes. The perceived trash in this case is not only the visual aesthetics but the main characters which are depicted as criminals, sodomites, cannibals, etc, the trash of society. This is evident as in the Cavalcade of Perversion, where "puke eaters" and "actual queers kissing" are part of the same spectacle and elicit the same guttural reactions from the "straight" audience. These depictions of filth reflect the sentiment social deviants such as queers might feel in reaction to society's treatment of deviants. "By forging a radical form of glamour based on a revaluation of trash and low culture, these performances refuse to value authenticity over artifice, beauty over ugliness, truth over trash."

At the end of the film, after being raped and beaten, Divine proclaims, "I'm a maniac! A maniac that cannot be cured! O Divine, I am Di-vine!" Although she might have been merely proclaiming her name, it is no accident that Divine was the chosen name of a character that seems to embody degeneracy itself. Divine draws power in these stories from the misfortune she faces, as every crime committed (against her or by her) pushes her further from society, prompting her to radicalize her behavior in retribution, which paradoxically grants her a sense of freedom from societal restraints. Multiple Maniacs is the intrinsic depiction of the perceived "free queer" in the 70s when the film was made—a sideshow attraction, a criminal, a junkie—yet it is also an intrinsic satire.

=== Religious imagery ===
John Waters has been described as the "Pope of Trash", a reference to the role that religious imagery plays throughout his films. In Multiple Maniacs, Divine is part of a dysfunctional heterosexual relationship. After being assaulted once more, she awakens to the Infant of Prague by her side. The child leads her to a church where she has her first homosexual encounter: a "rosary job" performed by Mink Stole's character. The sex scene is intercut with reenactments of the crucifixion. In a 2016 interview, Waters noted that the Catholic church is the only enemy he has left and that religion is so inherently anti-sex that it's easy to sexualize it. Moreover, he describes that rosaries and other religious symbols were popular in counterculture movements during the era, such as goth. The scene itself was inspired by a rosary that Mink Stole wore off-camera.

== Release ==
Multiple Maniacs had its world premiere at the First Unitarian Church in Baltimore on April 10, 1970. Waters later recalled that he toured the film throughout the United States, showing it at small arthouse theaters and other venues which often required a deposit to screen features. The film also showed internationally, with screenings in England in early 1971. In 2024, Waters recalled that the Ontario Censor Board burned a print of Multiple Maniacs that he sent for review.

=== Critical response ===
Upon the film's debut in 1970, The Baltimore Sun's Lou Cedrone wrote: "Multiple Maniacs is very smelly, save for a moment here and there when the Waters humor is apparent. And humor he has. It's just a shame he has chosen to ignore that for the brutality which is not, as he and his audiences may think, a gas." In 1981, Geoffrey Himes, also of The Baltimore Sun, referred to the film as "thoroughly disgusting" yet "also quite funny at times."

The film holds a 100% approval rating on Rotten Tomatoes, based on 23 critic reviews with an average rating of 7.2/10.

=== 2016 restoration ===
A new restoration of Multiple Maniacs by American art house film distribution company Janus Films and video distribution company The Criterion Collection was previewed June 17, 2016 at the Provincetown Film Festival, and national exhibition began August 5, 2016 at the IFC Center in New York City.

The Criterion Collection released the restored print on Blu-ray and DVD on March 21, 2017, featuring a commentary track by Waters among other newly produced special features. This release marked the first time the film had been available on a home format in 30 years, since its original VHS release by Cinema Group in 1987.

== Box office ==
Multiple Maniacs grossed $33,036 in North America.

== See also ==
- List of American films of 1970

== Works cited ==
- Davies, Jon (June 2004). Trash is Truth: Performances of Transgressive Glamour (PDF) (M.A. thesis). Toronto, Canada: York University.
