= John Waters =

American filmmaker (born 1946)

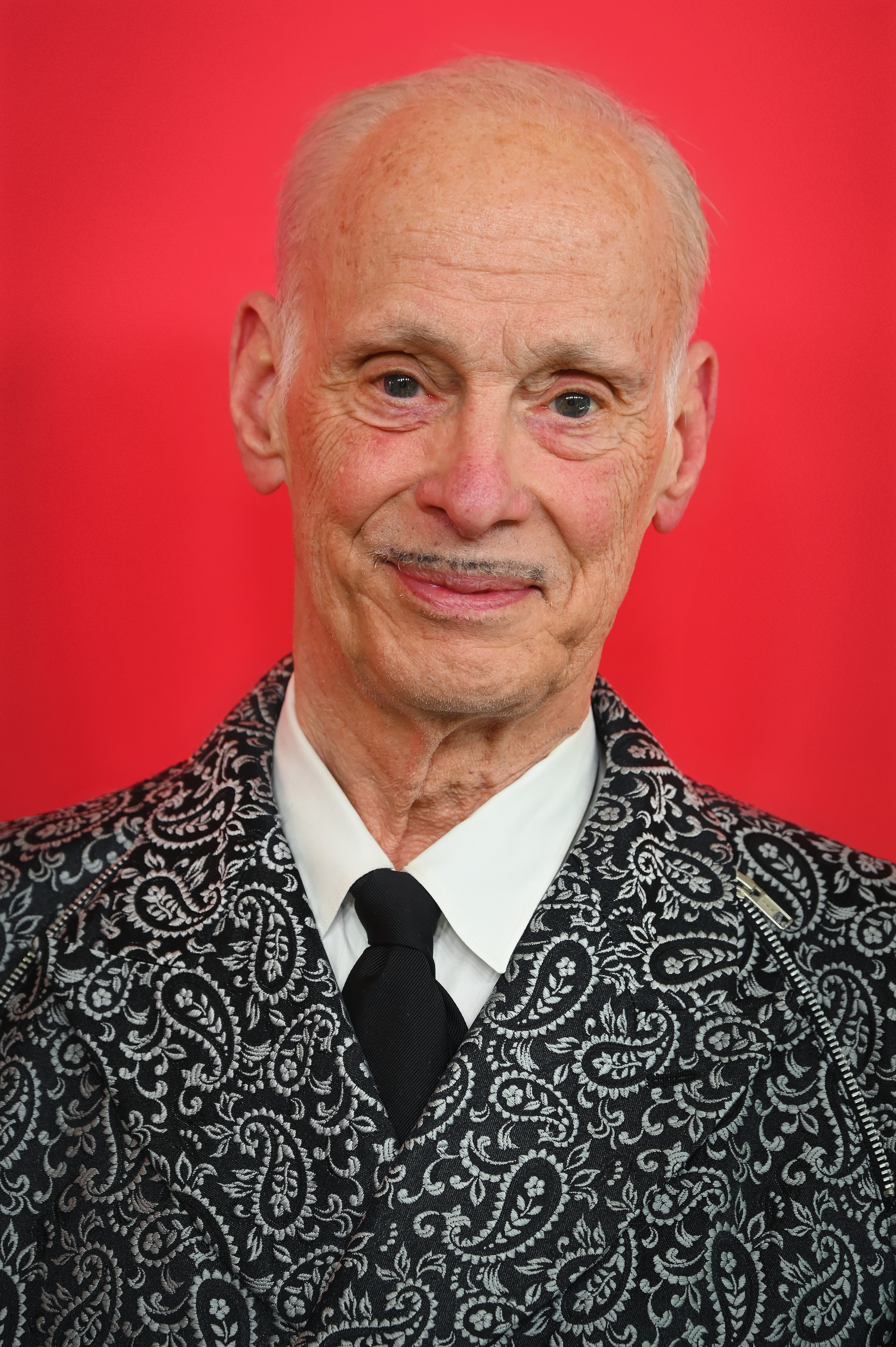
- Waters in 2025
- Born: John Samuel Waters Jr. April 22, 1946 (age 80); Baltimore, Maryland, U.S.
- Occupations: Filmmaker; actor; writer; artist
- Years active: 1964–present
- Organization: Dreamland Productions
- Relatives: George P. Whitaker (great-great-great-grandfather)

John Samuel Waters Jr. (born April 22, 1946) is an American filmmaker, actor, writer, and artist. He rose to fame in the early 1970s for his transgressive cult films, including Multiple Maniacs (1970), Pink Flamingos (1972), and Female Trouble (1974). Waters wrote and directed the comedy film Hairspray (1988), which was later adapted into a hit Broadway musical and a 2007 musical film. His other films include Desperate Living (1977), Polyester (1981), Cry-Baby (1990), Serial Mom (1994), Pecker (1998), and Cecil B. Demented (2000), each containing elements of post-modern comedy and surrealism.

As an actor, Waters has appeared in the films Sweet and Lowdown (1999), Mangus! (2011), Excision (2012), and Suburban Gothic (2014), as well as the Child's Play franchise with the film Seed of Chucky (2004) and the third season of the television series Chucky (2024). He hosted and produced the television series John Waters Presents Movies That Will Corrupt You (2006).

Waters also works as a visual artist and across different media, such as installations, photography, and sculpture. He was twice nominated for the Grammy Award for Best Spoken Word Album, narrating his audiobooks Carsick (2015) and Mr. Know-It-All (2020). Waters was named an officer of the French Order of Arts and Letters in 2018. He received a star on the Hollywood Walk of Fame in 2023.

== Early life and education ==
Waters was born on April 22, 1946, in Baltimore, Maryland, one of four children born to Patricia Ann (née Whitaker) and John Samuel Waters, a manufacturer of fire-protection equipment. He was raised Catholic by his mother, though his father was not Catholic. Through his mother, who immigrated as a child to the United States from Victoria, British Columbia, Canada, he is the third great-grandson of George P. Whitaker of the Whitaker iron family. Waters grew up in Lutherville, Maryland, a suburb of Baltimore. His boyhood friend and muse, Glenn Milstead, later known as Divine, also lived in Lutherville. Waters lived at 313 Morris Avenue in Lutherville from his early teenage years until he moved out in his early twenties. Waters and Milstead shot many of their early films at the house, dubbing the front lawn the "Dreamland Lot".

The film Lili inspired an interest in puppets in the seven-year-old Waters, who proceeded to stage violent versions of Punch and Judy for children's birthday parties. Biographer Robrt L. Pela says that Waters's mother believes the puppets in Lili had the greatest influence on Waters's subsequent career (though Pela believes tacky films at a local drive-in, which the young Waters watched from a distance through binoculars, had a greater effect).

Cry-Baby was also a product of Waters's boyhood, because of his fascination as a seven-year-old with the "drapes" then receiving intense news coverage because of the murder of Carolyn Wasilewski, a young "drapette", and his admiration for a young man living across the street who had a hot rod. Waters was privately educated at the Calvert School in Baltimore. After attending Towson Jr. High School in nearby Towson, and Calvert Hall College High School, he graduated from Boys' Latin School of Maryland. While still a teen, he made frequent trips into downtown Baltimore to visit Martick's, a beatnik bar, where he and Milstead met many of their later film collaborators. He was underage and could not enter the bar proper, but loitered in the adjacent alley, where he relied on older patrons to slip him drinks.

== Career ==
=== Early career ===
Waters's first short film was Hag in a Black Leather Jacket. MGM's The Wizard of Oz (1939) had a profound effect on Waters's creative mind. He said about it:

I was always drawn to forbidden subject matter in the very, very beginning. The Wizard of Oz opened me up because it was one of the first movies I ever saw. It opened me up to villainy, to screenwriting, to costumes. And great dialogue. I think the witch has great, great dialogue.

Waters has stated that he takes an equal amount of joy and influence from highbrow "art" films and sleazy exploitation films. Waters once said, "To understand bad taste one must have very good taste." In January 1966, Waters and some friends were caught smoking marijuana on the grounds of New York University, and he was soon kicked out of his dormitory. He returned to Baltimore, where he completed his next two short films, Roman Candles and Eat Your Makeup. They were followed by the feature-length films Mondo Trasho and Multiple Maniacs.

Waters became known as an underground filmmaker in the 1970s.

Waters's films became Divine's primary star vehicles. All of Waters's early films were shot in the Baltimore area with his company of local actors, the Dreamlanders—which, in addition to Divine, included Mink Stole, Cookie Mueller, Edith Massey, David Lochary, Mary Vivian Pearce, Susan Walsh, and others. Waters met Edith Massey while she was a bartender at Pete's Hotel. Waters's early campy movies present exaggerated characters in outrageous situations with hyperbolic dialogue. Pink Flamingos, Female Trouble and Desperate Living, which he labeled the Trash Trilogy, pushed hard at the boundaries of conventional propriety and censorship.

=== Move toward the mainstream ===
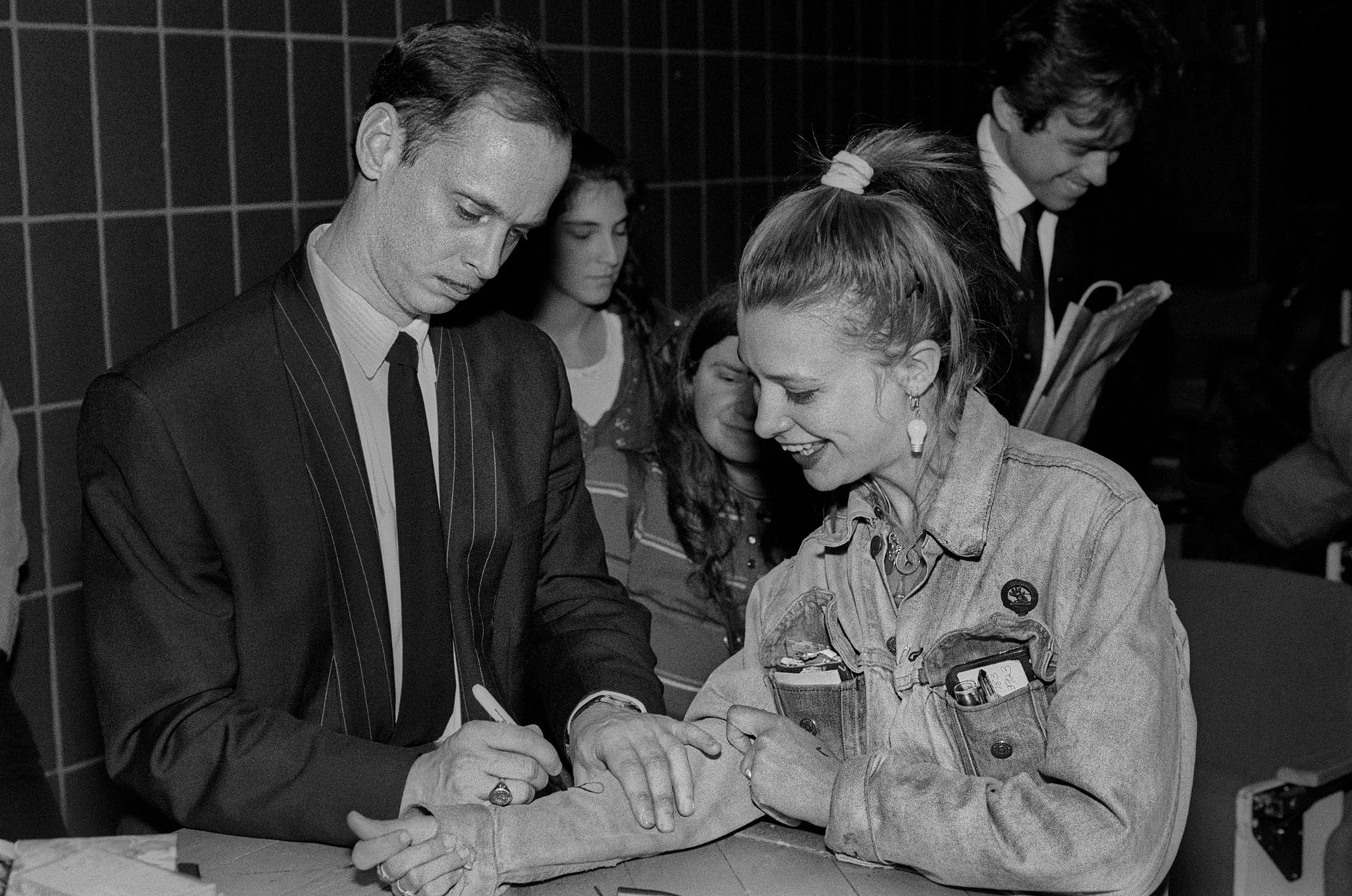
Waters signing a fan's jean jacket sleeve at the Massachusetts College of Art in Boston, 1990

Waters's 1981 film Polyester starred Divine opposite former teen idol Tab Hunter. It was the first time that Waters was not the primary camera operator for his own work, as he had started collaborating with local film student David Insley. Since then, his films have become less controversial and more mainstream, although works such as Hairspray, Cry-Baby, Serial Mom, Pecker and Cecil B. Demented still retain his trademark inventiveness. Hairspray became a hit Broadway musical that swept the 2003 Tony Awards; and a film adaptation of the Broadway musical was released in theaters on July 20, 2007, to positive reviews and commercial success. Cry-Baby, itself a musical, also became a Broadway musical.

In 2004, the NC-17-rated A Dirty Shame marked a return to Waters's earlier, more controversial work of the 1970s. Having received mixed reviews and bombing at the box-office, it is his last film so far. In 2007, Waters became the host ("The Groom Reaper") of 'Til Death Do Us Part, a program on America's Court TV network. In 2008, he planned to make a children's Christmas film, Fruitcake starring Johnny Knoxville and Parker Posey. Filming was set for November 2008, but the project was shelved in January 2009.

Waters has been open about financing problems for his movies. In 2010, Waters told the Chicago Tribune that "Independent films that cost $5 million are very hard to get made. I sold the idea, got a development deal, got paid a great salary to write it—and now the company is no longer around, which is the case with many independent film companies these days." In 2017, he stated that "they all want you to make a movie for under a million dollars, which I don't want to. I don't want to be a faux radical film-maker at 70. I did that. I don't need to do it again."

In October 2022, it was announced that Waters will adapt his novel, Liarmouth, into a film. Village Roadshow Pictures was set to produce, with Waters writing and directing. However, in November 2024, it was reported that the film was "no longer happening".

Waters has often created characters with alliterated names for his films, such as Corny Collins, Cuddles Kovinsky, Donald and Donna Dasher, Dawn Davenport, Fat Fuck Frank, Francine Fishpaw, Link Larkin, Motormouth Maybelle, Mole McHenry, Penny and Prudy Pingleton, Ramona Ricketts, Sandy Sandstone, Sylvia Stickles, Todd Tomorrow, Tracy Turnblad, Ursula Udders, Wade Walker and Wanda Woodward.

On September 18, 2023, Waters was honored with a star on the Hollywood Walk of Fame. Dreamlanders members Ricki Lake and Mink Stole were among the guest speakers.

== Other ventures ==
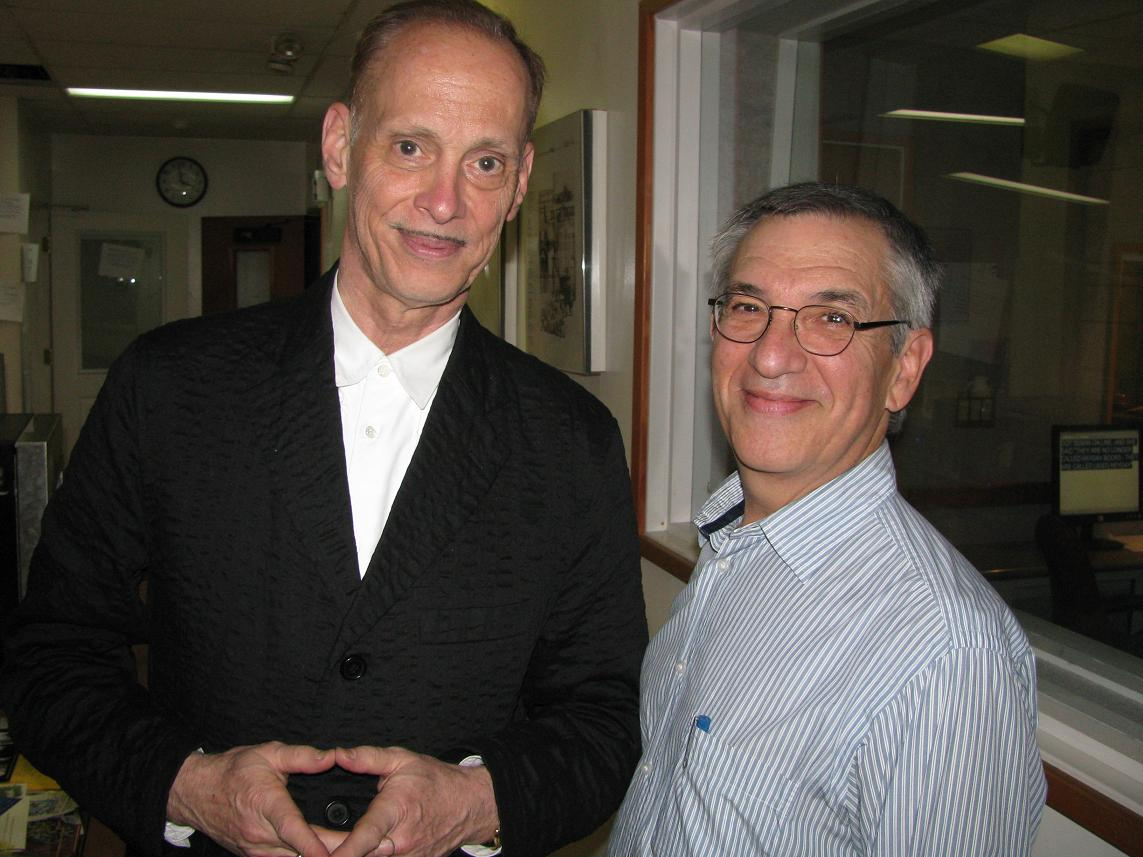
Waters with historian Jon Wiener in 2010

Waters is a bibliophile, with a collection of over 8,000 books. In 2011, during a visit to the Waters house in Baltimore, Andrew Edgecliffe-Johnson observed:

Bookshelves line the walls but they are not enough. The coffee table, desk and side tables are heaped with books, as is the replica electric chair in the hall. They range from Taschen art tomes such as The Big Butt Book to Jean Genet paperbacks and a Hungarian translation of Tennessee Williams with a pulp fiction cover. In one corner sits a doll from the horror spoof Seed of Chucky, in which Waters appeared. It feels like an eccentric professor's study, or a carefully curated exhibition based on the life of a fictional character.

Waters has had his fan mail delivered to Atomic Books, an independent bookstore in Baltimore, for over 20 years.

Puffing constantly on a cigarette, Waters appeared in a short film, shown in film art houses, announcing that "no smoking is permitted" in the theaters. The spot was directed by Douglas Brian Martin and produced by Douglas Brian Martin and Steven M. Martin. They also created two other short films for the Nuart Theatre (a Landmark Theater) in West Los Angeles, California, in appreciation for their showing Pink Flamingos for many years. It is shown immediately before any of Waters's films, and before the midnight showing of The Rocky Horror Picture Show.

Waters played a minister in Blood Feast 2: All U Can Eat, directed by Herschell Gordon Lewis.

In the 1980s, Waters taught inmates at the Patuxent Institution, a Maryland prison. He was hired to teach literature, but his classes also encompassed discussions of film. In 1985, he made a film with his students called Reckless Eyeballs, but it was not intended for release and was never publicly screened.

Waters is a board member of the Maryland Film Festival, and has selected and hosted a favorite film there each year since its launch in 1999. He is also on the advisory board of the Provincetown International Film Festival, and has hosted events and presented awards there every year since it was founded in 1999. He is a contributor to Artforum magazine and author of its year-end Top Ten Films list. Waters hosts an annual performance, "A John Waters Christmas", which was launched in 1996 at the Castro Theatre in San Francisco, and in 2018 toured 17 cities over 23 days.

In 2017, Waters began hosting an annual "Camp John Waters" event in Kent, Connecticut. Adult fans from as far away as Australia and Chile "relive their sleepaway camping days" with an "extra-campy theme weekend". Notable guests have included Debbie Harry, Patricia Hearst, Kathleen Turner, Mink Stole and Randy Harrison. In 2019, the Film Society of Lincoln Center celebrated its 50th anniversary at a gala where John Waters spoke in tribute to the Center along with Martin Scorsese, Dee Rees, Pedro Almodóvar, Tilda Swinton, Jake Gyllenhaal, Michael Moore, Paul Dano and Zoe Kazan.

=== Fine art ===
Since the early 1990s, Waters has been making photo-based artwork and installations that have been internationally exhibited in galleries and museums. Waters was offered his first art show by Colin de Land with American Fine Art gallery in 1992. In 2004, the New Museum in New York City presented a retrospective of his artwork curated by Marvin Heiferman and Lisa Phillips. His most recent exhibition John Waters: Indecent Exposure was exhibited at the Baltimore Museum of Art from October 2018 to January 2019 and later traveled to the Wexner Center for the Arts. Prior to that, Waters exhibited Rear Projection in April 2009, at the Marianne Boesky Gallery in New York and the Gagosian Gallery in Los Angeles. Waters has been represented by C. Grimaldis Gallery in Baltimore, Maryland, since 2002 and by Marianne Boesky Gallery in New York since 2006.

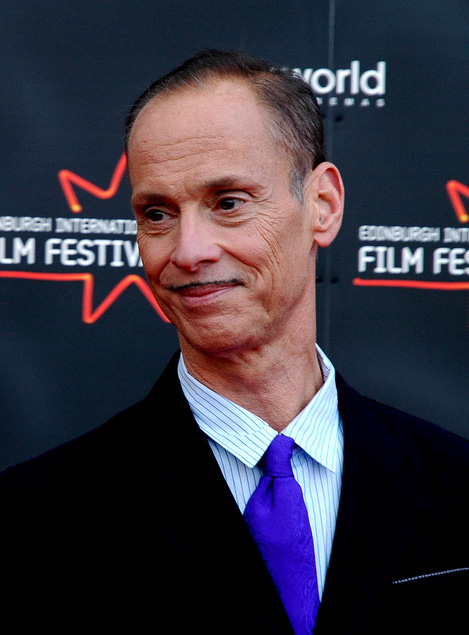
Waters in 2007

Waters's pieces are often comical, such as Rush (2009), a super-sized, tipped-over bottle of poppers (nitrite inhalants), and Hardy Har (2006), a photograph of flowers that squirts water at anyone who traverses a taped line on the floor. Waters has characterized his art as conceptual: "The craft is not the issue here. The idea is. And the presentation."

In November 2020, Waters promised to donate 372 artworks from his personal collection, including some of his own work as well as pieces by 125 artists, including Andy Warhol, Roy Lichtenstein, Cy Twombly, Cindy Sherman and more, to the Baltimore Museum of Art. In recognition of the donation, the museum named its rotunda after Waters, but Waters also insisted the museum name an all-gender bathroom after him. Both the rotunda and the bathroom were renamed for Waters in time for the opening of the first exhibition of his bequeathed collection, Coming Attractions: The John Waters Collection on November 20, 2022. Waters, who serves on the museum's board of directors, has stated the museum will acquire all of his art after his death.

=== Carsick ===
With the motif "My life is so over-scheduled, what will happen if I give up control?", Waters completed a hitchhiking journey across the United States from Baltimore to San Francisco, turning his adventures into a book titled Carsick. On May 15, 2012, while on the hitchhiking trip, Waters was picked up by 20-year-old Myersville, Maryland, councilman Brett Bidle, who thought Waters was a homeless hitchhiker standing in the pouring rain. Feeling bad for Waters, he agreed to drive him four hours to Ohio.

The next day, indie rock band Here We Go Magic tweeted that they had picked John Waters up hitchhiking in Ohio. He was wearing a hat with the text "Scum of the Earth". In Denver, Colorado, Waters reconnected with Bidle (who had made an effort to catch up with him); Bidle then drove him another 1,000 miles (1,600 km) to Reno, Nevada. Before parting ways, Waters arranged for Bidle to stay at his San Francisco apartment: "I thought, you know what, he wanted an adventure, too ... He's the first Republican I'd ever vote for."

Bidle later said: "We are polar opposites when it comes to our politics, religious beliefs. But that's what I loved about the whole trip. It was two people able to agree to disagree and still move on and have a great time. I think that's what America's all about."

== Personal life ==
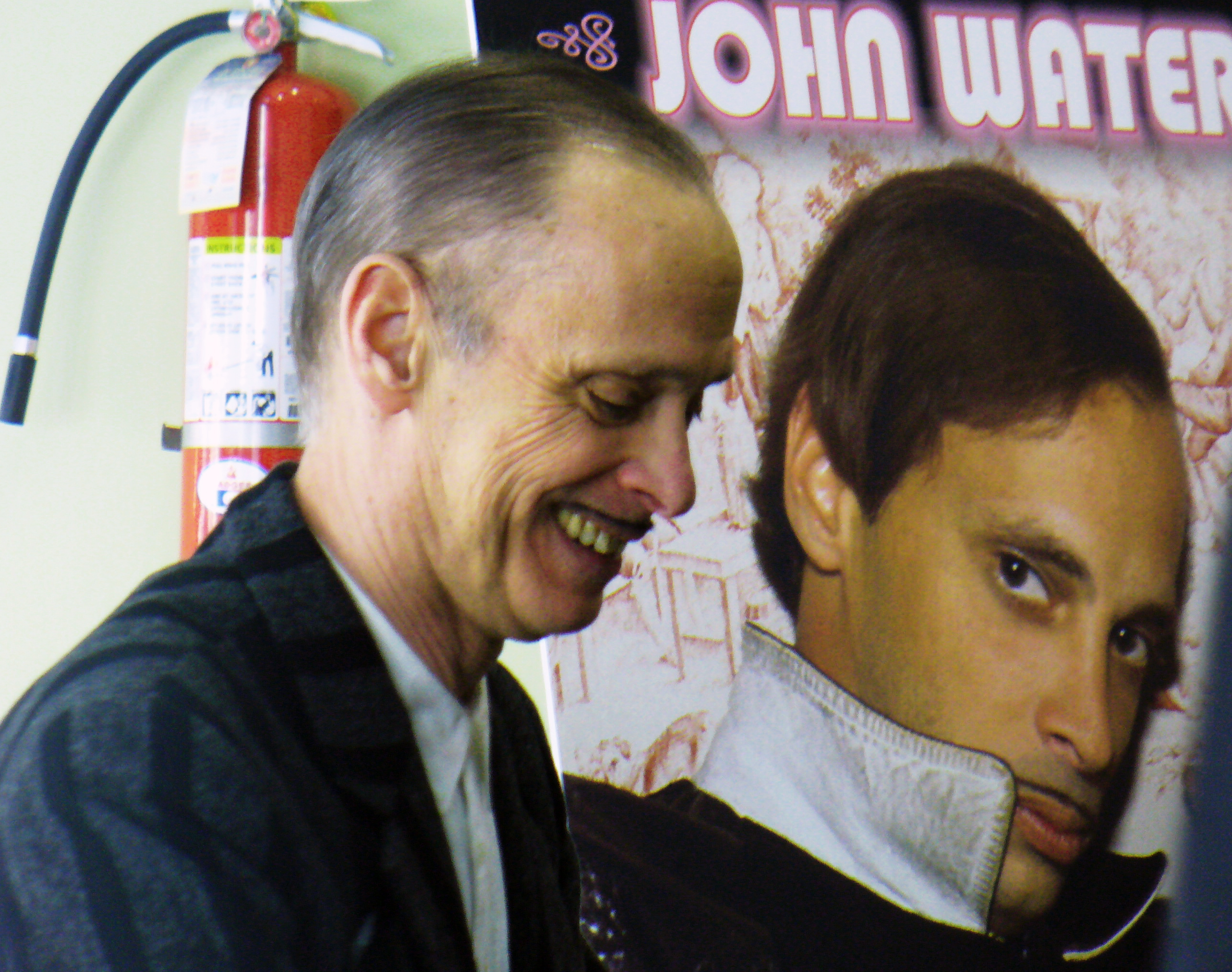
Waters in New York City, 2007

Although he has maintained apartments in New York City and San Francisco's Nob Hill, as well as a summer home in Provincetown, Waters mainly resides in Baltimore. All his films are set and shot there.

A gay man himself, Waters is an avid supporter of gay rights and gay pride. In a 2019 interview, he said that he dislikes publicly discussing his personal life, adding that he had a partner but that they both preferred to keep the relationship private.

Waters was a great fan of the music of Little Richard when growing up. He has said that, ever since he shoplifted a copy of the Little Richard song "Lucille" in 1957, at the age of 11, "I've wished I could somehow climb into Little Richard's body, hook up his heart and vocal cords to my own, and switch identities." In 1987, Playboy magazine employed Waters, then aged 41, to interview his idol, but the interview did not go well, with Waters later remarking: "It turned into kind of a disaster." Waters's signature pencil moustache is an homage to him.

Waters advocated for the parole of former Manson family member Leslie Van Houten, writing in his 2010 book Role Models, "Her crime was a long, long time ago and she has paid her dues to society". After Van Houten was paroled in 2023, Waters said he would not speak further about her, in deference to her privacy.

Throughout his life, Waters has been open about his recreational drug use, including marijuana and LSD, particularly with regard to his creative process. Waters began using LSD as a teenager, "tak[ing] LSD and see[ing] ... movies all the time". Waters was often on LSD while making his early films, claiming in a 2016 interview "I was on LSD [during Multiple Maniacs], I don't remember [how long it took to shoot the film]!" He tried LSD again in his 70s, and documented the experience in his 2019 book Mr. Know-It-All.

Waters was a smoker before quitting around 2004, saying "the only thing I've ever regretted in my whole life [was] smoking cigarettes. Because it was a nightmare giving up. It's the only thing the government ever told me that was true: It does kill you!" In 2022, Waters said that if he were to write his younger self a letter, he would say, "Quit smoking [cigarettes] and do everything else exactly the way you did."

== Other projects ==
Waters continues to be involved in creative ventures. In 2025, Waters narrated several different projects including an audiobook collection where he voiced every character from his early movies and screenplays which included Hairspray and Pink Flamingos.

== Filmography ==
=== Film ===
Year	Title	Director	Writer	Producer	DoP	Editor	Notes	Ref.
1964	Hag in a Black Leather Jacket	Yes	Yes	Yes	Yes	Yes	Short film	
1966	Roman Candles	Yes	Yes	Yes	Yes	Yes	Short film	
1968	Eat Your Makeup	Yes	Yes	Yes	Yes	Yes	Short film	
1968	Dorothy, the Kansas City Pot Head	Yes	Yes	Yes	Yes	Yes	Short film; unfinished	
1969	Mondo Trasho	Yes	Yes	Yes	Yes	Yes		
1970	The Diane Linkletter Story	Yes	Yes	Yes	Yes	Yes	Short film	
1970	Multiple Maniacs	Yes	Yes	Yes	Yes	Yes		
1972	Pink Flamingos	Yes	Yes	Yes	Yes	Yes		
1974	Female Trouble	Yes	Yes	Yes	Yes	Yes		
1977	Desperate Living	Yes	Yes	Yes	Yes	No		
1981	Polyester	Yes	Yes	Yes	No	No		
1988	Hairspray	Yes	Yes	Yes	No	No		
1990	Cry-Baby	Yes	Yes	No	No	No		
1994	Serial Mom	Yes	Yes	No	No	No		
1998	Pecker	Yes	Yes	No	No	No		
2000	Cecil B. Demented	Yes	Yes	No	No	No		
2004	A Dirty Shame	Yes	Yes	No	No	No		
2015	Kiddie Flamingos	Yes	Yes	No	No	No		
2019	Obscene Dogma 19	Yes	Yes	No	No	No	Short film	

==== As actor ====
Year	Title	Role	Notes	Ref.
1969	Mondo Trasho	Reporter	Voice cameo; uncredited	
1972	Pink Flamingos	Mr. J	Voice; uncredited	
1986	Something Wild	Used car salesman	Cameo	
1988	Hairspray	Dr. Fredrickson		
1989	Homer and Eddie	Robber No. 1	Cameo	
1994	Serial Mom	Ted Bundy	Voice cameo; uncredited	
1998	Pecker	Pervert on phone	Voice cameo; uncredited	
1999	Sweet and Lowdown	Mr. Haynes		
2000	Cecil B. Demented	Reporter	Cameo; uncredited	
2002	Blood Feast 2: All U Can Eat	The Reverend	Cameo	
2004	Seed of Chucky	Pete Peters		
2006	Plagues & Pleasures on the Salton Sea	Narrator	Voice; documentary	
2006	This Film Is Not Yet Rated	Himself	Documentary	
2006	Jackass Number Two	Himself	Guest appearance	
2007	Hairspray	Flasher	Cameo	
2007	The Junior Defenders	Narrator	Voice; direct-to-DVD	
2007	In the Land of Merry Misfits	Narrator	Voice	
2011	Mangus!	Jesus Christ		
2011	Of Dolls and Murder	Narrator	Voice; documentary	
2012	Excision	William		
2014	Suburban Gothic	Cornelius		
2015	Alvin and the Chipmunks: The Road Chip	Himself	Cameo	
2017	Mansfield 66/67	Himself	Documentary	
2019	30/30 Vision: 3 Decades of Strand Releasing	Himself	Segment "Obscene Dogma 19"	
TBA	Mugworth	Sir Butler	Voice	

=== Television ===
Year	Title	Role	Notes	Ref.
1990	21 Jump Street	Mr. Bean	Episode: "Awomp-Bomp-Aloobomb, Aloop Bamboom"	
1993, 1995	Homicide: Life on the Street	Bartender; R. Vincent Smith	2 episodes	
1997	The Simpsons	John	Voice; episode: "Homer's Phobia"	
1998	Frasier	Roger	Voice; episode: "The Maris Counselor"	
2006	John Waters Presents; Movies That Will Corrupt You	Himself (host)	13 episodes	
2006–2007	'Til Death Do Us Part	Groom Reaper	Main; 14 episodes	
2007	My Name Is Earl	Funeral director	Episode: "Kept a Guy Locked in a Truck"	
2011	Superjail!	Quetzalpocetlan	Voice; episode "Ghosts"	
2012	Fish Hooks	The Yeti Lobster	Voice; episode: "Rock Yeti Lobster"	
2013, 2018	Mickey Mouse	Wadsworth Thorndyke III	Voices; 2 episodes	
2014	Mr. Pickles	Dr. Kelton	Voice; episode: "Coma"	
2015	RuPaul's Drag Race	Himself	Guest judge; episode: "Divine Inspiration"	
2016	Clarence	Captain Tom	Voice; episode: "Plane Excited"	
2016	Hairspray Live!	—N/a	Associate producer	
2017	Feud: Bette and Joan	William Castle	Episode: "Hagsploitation"	
2018	The Blacklist	Himself	Episode: "Sutton Ross (No. 17)"	
2018	Liverspots and Astronots	O-Dor	Voice; episode: "The Exorcism of O-Dor"	
2019	Tigtone	Fertile Centaur	Voice; episode: "...and the Freaks of Love"	
2020–2021	Law & Order: Special Victims Unit	Floyd Cougat	2 episodes	
2021	Finding Your Roots	Himself (guest)	Episode: "To the Manor Born"	
2022	Search Party	Sheffield	2 episodes	
2022	The Marvelous Mrs. Maisel	Lazarus	Episode: "Interesting People on Christopher Street"	
2022	Bubble Guppies	Baron Von Bland	Voice; episode: "Taste Buddies!"	
2023	King Star King	God Star God	Voice; episode: "King Star King!/!/!/"	
2024	Chucky	Wendell Wilkins	Episode: "Final Destination"	
2024	Monster High	Scarecrow Von Twolegs / Treat	Voice; 2 episodes	
2024	Helluva Boss	Rolando	Voice; episode: "Ghostf**ckers"	
2024–2025	The Second Best Hospital in the Galaxy	Chtonk	Voice; 3 episodes	
2025	Digman!	Magnus Knight	Voice; episode: "The Arky Trials"	
2025	Sarah Squirm: Live + in the Flesh	Stage Manager	Stand-up special	
2026	American Horror Story: 13	Mr. Phibes	Recurring role; 5 episodes	

=== Video game ===
Year	Title	Voice role
2026	High on Life 2	Thurston Goodwell

Documentary appearances

- American Cinema
- The Andy Warhol Diaries
- Beautiful Darling
- Biography
- Celebrity Ghost Stories
- The Cockettes
- Divine Waters
- Divine Trash
- The Drexel Interview
- I Am Divine
- Love Letter to Edie
- E! True Hollywood Story
- Fabulous! The Story of Queer Cinema
- Le Grand Journal (Canal+)
- Guest of Cindy Sherman
- HBO's First Look
- Here's Looking at You, Boy – The Coming Out of Queer Cinema
- How Porn Conquered the World
- The Incredibly Strange Film Show
- Inside Deep Throat
- Intimate Portrait
- It Came From Kuchar
- Little Castles
- Little Richard: I Am Everything
- Lynch/Oz
- Mansfield 66/67
- Mansome
- Mary Oliver: Saved by the Beauty of the World
- Midnight Movies: From the Margin to the Mainstream
- Of Dolls and Murder
- Pie in the Sky: The Brigid Berlin Story
- Queens of Disco (BBC Four)
- SexTV
- Spine Tingler! The William Castle Story
- Tab Hunter Confidential
- The Simpsons 20th Anniversary Special – In 3-D! On Ice!
- That Man: Peter Berlin
- These Amazing Shadows: The Movies That Make America
- This Film Is Not Yet Rated
- Tracks
- VH1 Behind the Music (Blondie)
- William S. Burroughs: A Man Within

== Other credits ==
- This Filthy World – Waters's touring one-man show, made into a feature film directed by Jeff Garlin
- Mommie Dearest (1981) – Audio commentary on film's "Hollywood Royalty Edition" DVD release (2006)
- The Little Mermaid Special Edition DVD (2006) – Interview on 'making of' documentary about Howard Ashman, the theatre (i.e. Little Shop of Horrors), and the inspiration behind the character Ursula: Divine
- A Date with John Waters (2007), a CD collection of songs Waters finds romantic
- Christmas Evil DVD release (2006) – Audio commentary
- Breaking Up with John Waters – Waters's third CD compilation rumored as "currently in the works" in 2004
- The Other Hollywood – Commentary and opinions about pornography throughout the book
- "The Creep" (featuring Nicki Minaj) – Appeared on a television set in The Lonely Island's music video "The Creep", which made its debut on Saturday Night Live. Waters gives the introduction to the song and he is credited as a featured artist on the album.
- Art:21 – Introducing Host for Season Two, "Stories" episode – PBS DVD series

== Published works ==
- Waters, John (1981). Shock Value. New York: Dell Pub. Co. ISBN 0-440-57871-X.
- Waters, John (1986). Crackpot: The Obsessions of John Waters. New York: Scribner. ISBN 0-02-624440-3.
- Waters, John; Hainley, Bruce (2003). Art: A Sex Book. New York: Thames & Hudson. ISBN 0-500-28435-0.
- Waters, John (2010). Role Models. New York: Farrar, Straus and Giroux. ISBN 978-0-374-25147-5.
- Waters, John (2014). Carsick: John Waters Hitchhikes Across America. New York: Farrar, Straus and Giroux. ISBN 978-0-374-29863-0.
- Waters, John (2017). Make Trouble. Chapel Hill, NC: Algonquin Books. ISBN 978-1-61620-635-2.
- Waters, John (2019). Mr. Know-It-All: The Tarnished Wisdom of a Filth Elder. New York: Farrar, Straus and Giroux. ISBN 978-0-374-21496-8.

Novel

- Waters, John (2022). Liarmouth: A Feel-Bad Romance. New York: Farrar, Straus and Giroux. ISBN 978-0-374-18572-5.

Screenplays

- Waters, John (1988). Trash Trio: Three Screenplays: Pink Flamingos, Desperate Living, Flamingos Forever. New York: Vintage Books. ISBN 0-394-75986-9.
- Waters, John (2005). Pink Flamingoes and Other Filth: Three Screenplays. New York: Thunder's Mouth Press. ISBN 1560257016.
- Waters, John (2005). Hairspray, Female Trouble and Multiple Maniacs: Three More Screenplays. New York: Thunder's Mouth Press. ISBN 1-56025-702-4.
- Waters, John (2025). Pink Flamingos. New York: Picador. ISBN 9781250371331.
- Waters, John (2025). Desperate Living. New York: Picador. ISBN 9781250371232.
- Waters, John (2025). Flamingos Forever. New York: Picador. ISBN 9781250371270.
- Waters, John (2025). Hairspray. New York: Picador. ISBN 9781250371294.
- Waters, John (2025). Female Trouble. New York: Picador. ISBN 9781250371256.
- Waters, John (2025). Multiple Maniacs. New York: Picador. ISBN 9781250371317.

Photo collections

- Waters, John (1997). Director's Cut. New York: Scalo. ISBN 3-931141-56-X.
- Waters, John (2006). Unwatchable. New York: Marianne Boesky Gallery. ISBN 0-9779503-0-1.

== Discography ==
- A John Waters Christmas – A CD of Christmas songs compiled by Waters (2004)
- A Date With John Waters – A CD of love songs for Valentine's Day compiled by Waters. New Line Records (2007)
- Role Models – Audiobook narrated by John Waters. Tantor Media (2010)
- Featured in The Lonely Island song and SNL Digital Short, The Creep (feat. Nicki Minaj) (2011)
- Carsick: John Waters Hitchhikes Across America – Audiobook narrated by John Waters. Macmillan Audio (2014)
- Make Trouble – Spoken word speech. Jack White's Third Man Records (2017). Produced by Grammy-winner Ian Brennan
- Mr. Know-It-All: The Tarnished Wisdom of a Filth Elder – Audiobook narrated by John Waters. Macmillan Audio (2019)
- Prayer to Pasolini – Spoken word speech recorded at the murder site of filmmaker Pier Paolo Pasolini on the outskirts of Rome. Sub Pop Records (2021). Produced by Grammy-winner, Ian Brennan.
- Liarmouth: A Feel-Bad Romance (A Novel) – Audiobook narrated by John Waters. Macmillan Audio (2022)
- It's in the Book – Spoken word tribute to comedian Johnny Standley. Sub Pop Records (2022). Produced by Grammy-winner, Ian Brennan.
- John Waters Covers The Singing Dogs' "Jingle Bells" b/w "It's a Punk Rock Christmas" – Comedy Christmas music. Sub Pop Records (2024).
- The John Waters Screenplay Collection – Audiobook narrated by John Waters. Macmillan Audio (2025)

== Awards and nominations ==
In 1999, Waters was honored with the Filmmaker on the Edge Award at the Provincetown International Film Festival. In September 2015, the British Film Institute ran a program to celebrate 50 years of Waters films which included all of his early films, some previously unscreened in the UK.

In 2014, Waters was nominated for a Grammy for the spoken word version of his book, Carsick. His follow-up record, Make Trouble, was produced by Grammy-winning producer, Ian Brennan, and released on Jack White's Third Man Records in the fall of 2017. Waters received his second Grammy-nomination in 2020 for Mr. Know-It-All: The Tarnished Wisdom of a Filth Elder.

In 2015, he received the Ted M. Larson Award at the Fargo Film Festival for his contribution to filmmaking.

In 2016, Waters received an honorary degree from the Maryland Institute College of Art in Baltimore during the college's undergraduate commencement ceremony. He received an honorary doctorate from the University of Baltimore in 2023.

In 2017, Waters received Timeless Star honors from the Gay and Lesbian Entertainment Critics Association (now GALECA: The Society of LGBTQ Entertainment Critics). The group's career achievement award goes to an entertainment figure "whose exemplary career is marked by character, wisdom and wit."

In 2018, Waters was named an Officier of the Ordre des Arts et des Lettres, a cultural award from the French government.

In 2023, Waters received a star on the Hollywood Walk of Fame. His friends and collaborators Mink Stole, Greg Gorman, and Ricki Lake spoke at the induction. Waters brought a photo of his parents to the unveiling, dedicating the honor to them. Waters's star was placed in front of Larry Edmunds Bookshop on Hollywood Boulevard, a store Waters frequents.

=== Nominations ===
Year	Award	Category	Nominated work	Result	Ref.
1988	Sundance Film Festival	Grand Jury Prize	Hairspray	Nominated	
1989	Independent Spirit Awards	Best Feature	Hairspray	Nominated	
1989	Independent Spirit Awards	Best Director	Hairspray	Nominated	
1998	Gijón International Film Festival	Grand Prix Asturias	Pecker	Nominated	
2015	Grammy Awards	Best Spoken Word Album	Carsick: John Waters Hitchhikes Across America	Nominated	
2020	Grammy Awards	Best Spoken Word Album	Mr. Know-It-All	Nominated	

== See also ==
- LGBT culture in New York City
- List of LGBT people from New York City
