= List of Czech Americans =

This is a list of notable Czech Americans.

Many people on this list are not ethnically Czech but rather born in Bohemian/Moravian territory, of German and/or Jewish extraction.

To be included in this list, the person must have a Wikipedia article showing they are Czech American or must have references showing they are Czech American and are notable.

== Business ==
- Fred Figner, Bohemiam-born entrepreneur with North-American citizenship, coming from a Jewish family, pioneer of music recording in Brazil and South America, pioneer of record manufacturing, a great trader of writing machines in Brazil, a spiritist writer and supporter of Alan Kardec's religion/philosophy and a great philanthropist.
- Ray Kroc, founder of McDonald Empire
- Jon Ledecky, co-owner of the New York Islanders
- Sigmund Mandl, Jewish-Moravian immigrant, founded Husky Wrench Company in Wisconsin in 1924
- Thomas Pritzker, chairman of Hyatt and member of the Pritzker family
- Donald Trump Jr., son of Donald and Ivana, co-trustee of The Trump Organization with Eric
- Eric Trump, son of Donald and Ivana, co-trustee of The Trump Organization with Donald Jr.
- Ivana Trump, Moravia-born businesswoman, former model, ex-wife of Donald Trump
- Ivanka Trump, daughter of Donald and Ivana

== Creative writing ==
- Miles J. Breuer, trained as physician, an early science fiction writer
- James Thomas Flexner, of Bohemian ancestry, one of American foremost men of letters, especially noted for his four-volume Biography of George Washington
- Patricia Hampl, writer; one of the founding members of the Loft Literary Center
- Arnost Lustig, notable writer of the Holocaust
- Frederic Prokosch, novelist and poet
- Joanie Holzer Schirm, writer, Global Ebook Award Winner, Best Biography 2013, Czech WWII stories, Father was Czech-American physician
- Charles Sealsfield (pseudonym of Karl Anton Postl), author of romantic novels with American backgrounds and travelogues.
- Clifford Donald Simak, American science fiction writer
- Nicholas Sparks, internationally bestselling American novelist and screenwriter
- Joseph Wechsberg, free-lance writer associated with the New Yorker magazine
- Franz Werfel, famous novelist, playwright, and poet, known especially for his novel, Song of Bernadette

== Dramatic art ==
- Karen Black, actress
- Adrien Brody, film actor. His maternal grandmother was of Czech Jewish background.
- Anna Chlumsky, actress
- Frank Daniel, film producer, writer, director and first dean of the American Film Institute
- Don DeFore, actor
- Miloš Forman, film director
- Brendan Fraser, actor
- Karl Freund, cinematographer and director
- Bruce Glover, film actor (of part Czech descent)
- Crispin Glover, film producer, writer, director and actor, both parents of part Czech descent
- Fanny Janauschek, famed character actress, who became famous acting in great Shakespearean parts and other famous parts
- Jim Jarmusch, independent filmmaker
- January Jones, actress
- Ashton Kutcher, motion picture actor, of 5/8 Czech descent
- Cloris Leachman Actress
- Francis Lederer, born Prague, Czechoslovakia, actor, leading man in Hollywood from 1933, after European stage and film experience.
- Ryan Lee, actor
- Karl Malden, Czech mother, an actor, whose career that spanned more than seven decades, he performed in such classic films as A Streetcar Named Desire, for which he won the Academy Award for Best Supporting Actor
- Jay Manuel, creative director
- Donna Murphy, actress
- Brandon Novak, motivational speaker, author, reality star, skateboarder
- Eva Novak, born St. Louis, Missouri, of Bohemian ancestry, an actress, a silent screen lady; she starred as Tom Mix's love interest in ten of his westerns, including "Sky High" and "Trailin"
- Jane Novak, born St. Louis, Missouri, of Bohemian ancestry, an actress; the celebrated blond beauty and a leading lady to such stars as W. S. Hart, Tom Mix, Harold Lloyd, Hobart Bosworth, W. D. Taylor, Charles Ray, etc.
- Kim Novak, motion picture actress
- Nancy Novotny, voice actress and radio personali
- Ivan Passer, film director
- Paulina Porizkova, actress and supermodel (featured in Sports Illustrated Swimsuit Edition)
- Craig Pospisil, playwright
- Antonio Sabato Jr., actor and model
- Walter Slezak, film actor
- Maelcum Soul (1940–1986), bartender, artist's model, and actress
- Sissy Spacek, actress, her father was of Czech origin
- Rip Torn, film actor, first cousin of Sissy Spacek (mother of Czech descent)
- Edgar G. Ulmer, cult film director, born in Olomouc
- George Voskovec, actor, writer
- Tom Wopat, actor
- Blanche Yurka (orig, Jurka), of Czech immigrant father, an American theatre and film actress until the late 1960s. In addition to her many stage roles, including Queen Gertrude opposite John Barrymore's Hamlet, she was also a director and playwright
- William Zabka, actor, producer, screenwriter, and martial artist
- Winter Ave Zoli, actress and model

== Exploration ==
- Eugene Cernan, of Czech mother, astronaut; was last man of Apollo to leave his footprints on the moon.
- Jim Lovell, astronaut; was command module pilot of Apollo 8, man's first flight around the moon.

== Government and politics ==
- Madeleine Albright, born in Prague, former U.S. Secretary of State
- John J. Babka, U.S. Representative from Ohio
- Walter S. Baring Jr., U.S. Representative of Nevada
- Richard Bassett desc. of Augustine Herman, signer of the US constitution.
- James Asheton Bayard (III), desc. of Augustine Herman, an American lawyer who served as U.S. Senator from Delaware.
- Richard Henry Bayard, desc. of Augustine Herman, an American lawyer, a member of the Whig Party who served as the first Mayor of Wilmington, Chief Justice of the Delaware Superior Court, and as U.S. Senator from Delaware.
- Thomas Francis Bayard Sr., desc. of Augustine Herman, an American lawyer who served three terms as U.S. Senator from Delaware, and as U.S. Secretary of State, and U.S. Ambassador to the United Kingdom.
- Thomas F. Bayard Jr., desc. of Augustine Herman, served two terms as U.S. Senator from Delaware
- Mark Begich, United States senator from Alaska from 2009 to 2015
- George H. Bender, United States senator
- Karl A. Brabenec, parents both born in Czechoslovakia, New York State Assemblyman, 98th District
- Dan Benishek (born 1952), American physician; serving as the U.S. representative for Michigan's 1st congressional district (R-MI)
- Anton Cermak was the Mayor of Chicago, Illinois
- Roman Hruska was Senator from Nebraska
- Darrell Issa, U.S. representative for California's 49th congressional district
- John Kasich (born 1952), former United States Representative and the 69th and former Governor of Ohio
- Charles Jonas, 16th Lieutenant Governor of Wisconsin
- Otto Kerner Jr., 33rd Governor of Illinois
- John Forbes Kerry, 68th United States Secretary of State and the presidential nominee of the Democratic Party in the 2004 presidential election
- Cllr. August Klecka, editor of the Telegraf and first Czech-American elected to the Baltimore City Council (parents from Nehodiv and Kvášňovice)
- Kris Kobach, Secretary of State of Kansas, serving since 2011
- Thomas F. Konop, U.S. Representative of Wisconsin
- Andrej Lisanik, leader of the National Renaissance Party (United States)
- Deborah R. Malac (born 1955), United States Ambassador to Uganda from 2016 to 2020
- Joe Manchin, senior United States senator from West Virginia
- Anthony Michalek was member of the U.S. House of Representatives from Chicago, Illinois
- Robert J. Mrazek, U.S. Representative of New York's 3rd district. (5th cousin twice removed of August Klecka)
- Edmund Jennings Randolph, desc. of Augustine Herman, an American attorney, the seventh Governor of Virginia, the second Secretary of State, and the first US Attorney General.
- Adolph J. Sabath was member of the U.S. House of Representatives from Chicago, Illinois
- Steve Sisolak, Governor of Nevada
- Harold Stassen 25th governor of Minnesota from 1939 to 1943
- Karl Stefan, U.S. Representative
- Elise Stefanik, U.S. Representative from New York
- Judy Baar Topinka, former Illinois State Treasurer, Illinois Comptroller General, and Chair of the Illinois Republican Party.
- Robert Vanasek Minnesota politician and a former member and Speaker of the Minnesota House of Representatives
- Ron Mottl, U.S. Representative from Ohio
- Charles Vanik, U.S. Representative from Ohio
- Scott Walker, Governor of Wisconsin and 2016 candidate for President of the United States
- Caspar Weinberger of Bohemian ancestry on his father's side, politician, vice president and general counsel of Bechtel Corporation, and Secretary of Defense under President Ronald Reagan from January 21, 1981, until November 23, 1987.

== Humanities and social sciences ==
- Francis Dvornik, Moravia-born, authority on Byzantine history, Slavic history and civilization.
- Saul Friedländer, Prague-born, award-winning historian, currently a professor of history at UCLA.
- Ales Hrdlicka, founder of American physical anthropology.
- Paul Felix Lazarsfeld, of Moravian ancestry, founder of modern empirical sociology.
- Richard Neustadt, of Bohemian ancestry, political scientist at Harvard; first director of J.F. Kennedy Inst. of Politics.
- Beardsley Ruml, of Czech immigrant father, economist, devised plan to collect taxes at their source by means of a payroll deduction system, on a pay as you go basis.
- Joseph Alois Schumpeter, Moravia-born, notable economist at Harvard University.
- Jan Švejnar, Prague-born, notable economist.
- Frank William Taussig, of Czech ancestry, economist and educator, credited with creating the foundations of modern trade theory.
- Vlasta Vraz, of Czech ancestry, worked for Czech war relief and other Czech causes in Prague and US
- René Wellek, of Czech father, founder of literary criticism and comparative literature.
- Max Wertheimer, Czech-born psychologist who was one of the founders of Gestalt psychology.

== Law ==
- Louis D. Brandeis, son of Czech immigrant, Justice of US Supreme Court.
- Paul Freund, of Bohemian ancestry, lawyer; professor of law at Harvard University; authority on public law and understanding the Supreme Court.
- Hans Kelsen, Prague-born jurist and legal philosopher; one of the most important legal scholars of the 20th century.
- James F. Matousek, an American lawyer born to Czech immigrants.
- John Roberts, Chief Justice of US Supreme Court.

== Music ==
- Ric Ocasek, singer-songwriter, leader of The Cars, member of the Rock and Roll Hall of Fame, and record producer for Weezer, Bad Brains, and Nada Surf.
- Jan Balatka, conductor, founder of the Milwaukee Musical Society
- Jerry Cantrell, guitarist, singer-songwriter of the Seattle-based Alice in Chains
- Exene Cervenka, singer of the Los Angeles-based X (American band)
- Renee Fleming, opera singer
- Rudolf Firkusny, pianist of note
- Rudolf Friml, composer of operettas
- Jan Hammer, musician, film music composer; Mahavishnu Orchestra keyboardist
- Karel Husa, Pulitzer Prize-winning composer
- Maria Jeritza (orig. Marie Jedlickova), born Brno, Moravia, a famed Metropolitan Opera singer, known for her role as Sieglinda, Elisabeth, Santuzza, Fedora, Rosalinda, Carmen, Salome, Octavius, Tosca and Turandot
- Tomas Kalnoky, Prague-born lead guitarist/vocalist of New Jersey ska punk band Streetlight Manifesto
- Jerome David Kern, of Bohemian ancestry on his mother' side (Fanny Kakeles), one of the most important American theatre composers of the early 20th century, he wrote more than 700 songs, used in over 100 stage works, including such classics as "Ol' Man River", "Can't Help Lovin' Dat Man", "A Fine Romance", "Smoke Gets in Your Eyes", "All the Things You Are", "The Way You Look Tonight", etc.
- Erich Wolfgang Korngold, Brno-born Hollywood composer
- Irwin Kostal, musical arranger of films and an orchestrator of Broadway musicals
- Ivan Kral, musician and director
- Katrina Leskanich, singer, author and former lead singer of British pop-rock band Katrina and the Waves
- Bohumil Makovsky, band leader
- Mark Matejka, guitarist of Lynyrd Skynyrd
- Tim McGraw, country singer-songwriter
- Václav Nelhýbel, composer
- Jason Mraz, singer-songwriter
- Stephanie Novacek, operatic mezzo-soprano of Czech descent
- Jarmila Novotná, opera singer
- Walter Parazaider, saxophone and woodwinds Chicago
- Neyla Pekarek, cello and vocals The Lumineers
- Rudolf Serkin, eminent pianist
- George Szell, prominent conductor and composer of Cleveland Orchestra
- Miroslav Vitouš, musician (Weather Report bassist)
- Jaromír Weinberger, composer

== Media and publishing ==
- Jim Acosta, CNN journalist
- Meyer Berger, Pulitzer Prize–winning journalist and columnist for The New York Times.
- Mika Emilie Leonia Brzezinski, of Czech mother, TV news journalist at MSNBC, co-host of MSNBC's weekday morning program Morning Joe.
- Tony Dokoupil, broadcast journalist and author. Co-anchor of CBS Mornings.
- Wanda Jablonski, Polish immigrant born in Moravia (now Czech Rep.), journalist that founded Petroleum Intelligence Weekly in 1961, which came to be known as the "bible of the oil industry", and ran it until 1988.
- Janet Malcolm, journalist, New Yorker staff writer, born in Prague.
- Edward Rosewater, founder of the daily The Omaha Daily Bee which developed into the largest and most influential newspaper on the mid-west.
- Jim Svejda, announcer for KUSC radio in Los Angeles, a nationally known classical music station.
- Rosa Sonneschein, born in Prostejov, Moravia, founder and editor of The American Jewess magazine – the first English-language periodical targeted to American Jewish women.
- Jeff Zeleny, Pulitzer Prize-winning journalist for CNN and the New York Times; of Czech ancestry on both sides of his family.

== Medicine ==
- Jan Klein, immunologist, best known for his work on the major histocompatibility complex (MHC).
- Karl Koller, Bohemia-born ophthalmologist, a discoverer of using cocaine as a local anesthetic for eye surgery.
- Bohdan Pomahač, plastic surgeon, he led the team that performed the first full face transplant in United States and the third overall in the world.
- Helen Repa, nurse, hero of the SS Eastland Disaster of 1915.
- Peter Safar, Austrian physician of Czech descent, who is credited with pioneering cardiopulmonary resuscitation.
- Helen Taussig, granddaughter of Czech immigrant, medical researcher at Johns Hopkins University who alerted physicians of the dangers of thalidomide.

== Military ==
- Claude C. Bloch, US Navy Admiral who commanded the 14th Naval District during the Attack on Pearl Harbor.
- Leopold Karpeles, Color Sergeant, recipient of Congressional Medal of Honor for heroism in 1864 during the Civil War.
- William F. Lukes, US Navy sailor, a recipient of the Medal of Honor for his actions in the 1871 Korean Expedition.
- Coral Wong Pietsch, of Czech mother and Chinese father, a Brigadier General in the United States Army Reserve; the first 'Asian' American woman to reach the rank of Brigadier General in the United States Army.
- Apollo Soucek, Vice Admiral in the US Navy, who was a record-breaking test pilot during 1929–1930.
- Henry Svehla, Army PFC., of Czech father, awarded posthumously by President Obama a Medal of Honor for his heroic action during Korean War.

== Pioneer colonists ==
- Joachim Gans from Prague, metallurgist, member of the first English colonization effort in America (Roanoke, 1585)
- Augustine Herman one of the earliest immigrants in America from Bohemia; creator of first accurate map of Maryland and Virginia
- Frederick Philipse descendant of Bohemian aristocratic family, wealthiest person in New Amsterdam (New York)

== Religion ==
- Petr Esterka Bishop for Czech Catholics in Diaspora in Canada and the United States (1999–2021) and auxiliary bishop of Brno (1999–2013).
- Lewis Hodous, American missionary and Sinologist.
- Joseph Maria Koudelka, second bishop of Diocese of Superior.
- John Neumann, Bishop of Philadelphia; first American male Saint.
- David Nitschmann, (1696–1772), first bishop of the renewed Unitas fratrum, the Moravian Church.
- Isaac Mayer Wise, Rabbi, Founder of Reform Judaism in the US.
- David Zeisberger, famed Moravian missionary among the Indians.
- Patrick Zurek, current bishop of Amarillo since his appointment by Pope Benedict XVI on 3 January 2008.

== Science and technology ==
- Alfred Bader, son of Czech immigrant, founder of Aldrich Chemical Company, art collector, philanthropist.
- Thomas Cech, of Czech ancestry, Nobel Prize laureate in chemistry.
- Carl Cori, Prague-born Nobel Prize laureate.
- Gerty Cori, Prague born Nobel Prize laureate.
- John C. Dvorak, of Czech ancestry, columnist and broadcaster in the areas of technology and computing.
- Abraham Flexner, son of Czech immigrant, reformer of American medical education, founder of Institute of Advanced study, Princeton.
- Simon Flexner, son of Czech immigrant, pathologist, founder and first director of the Rockefeller Institute (now University).
- Václav Hlavatý, noted Czech-American mathematician, who solved some very difficult equations relating to Einstein's Unified field theory.
- Lilli Hornig, scientist who worked on the Manhattan Project.
- Aleš Hrdlička, physical anthropologist of note; founder and the first curator of physical anthropology of the U.S. National Museum.
- Josef Allen Hynek, of Czech ancestry, astronomer, professor, and ufologist.
- Karl Jansky, of Czech ancestry, discoverer of radio astronomy.
- Frederick Jelinek, pioneer of statistical methods in computational linguistics.
- Gustav Lindenthal, Brno-born, notable civil engineer who designed the Hell Gate Bridge (1917) among other bridges.
- Frank Malina, of Czech parents, aeronautical engineer who designed the first U. S. rocket to break the 50-mile altitude mark, becoming the first sounding rocket to reach space.
- James Pustejovsky, Czech-American computer scientist specializing in theoretical and computational modeling of language.
- Mila Rechcigl, biochemist who pioneered early studies on enzyme synthesis and degradation; one of the founders and long-time President of SVU.
- Oldrich Vasicek, mathematician, author of several financial models including Vasicek model.
- Paul Zamecnik, of Czech ancestry, a biochemist of note, who played a central role in the early history of molecular biology.
- Charles Zeleny, Czech-American zoologist, and professor at the University of Illinois, who made important contributions to experimental zoology, especially embryology, regeneration, and genetics.
- John Zeleny, physicist.

== Sports and acrobatics ==
- Hugo Bezdek, football, basketball and baseball coach, inductee in the College Football Hall of Fame (1954)
- Alan Benes, former Major League pitcher
- Andy Benes, former Major League pitcher
- George Blanda, of Czech mother, former football player
- Jeremy Bleich, baseball pitcher
- Nicole Bobek, former figure skater
- Mike Cervenak, Major League player
- Hunter Cervenka, baseball player
- David Chodounsky, olympic alpine skier
- Charles Dvorak
- Christian Dvorak hockey player
- Amy Fadhli, fitness model 1996 (Czech mother and Iraqi father)
- Jim Furyk, professional golfer
- Randal Grichuk, professional baseball player
- George S. Halas, "Papa Bear", player-coach of the Chicago Bears
- John Havlicek, of Czech ancestry, basketball player
- Bobby Holik, hockey player, naturalized American citizen
- Mike Holovak, baseball player
- Jeff Hornacek, former basketball player and NBA basketball coach
- Al Hostak, middleweight boxing champion
- Jaromir Jagr, hockey player
- Patrick Kane, professional ice hockey player of Czech ancestry
- Chris Kanyon, WWE wrestler, real name was Christopher Klucsarits
- Madison Kocian, Olympic gymnast
- Jessica Korda, professional golfer
- Nelly Korda, professional golfer
- Sebastian Korda, tennis player
- Austin Krajicek, tennis player
- Robert Lang, hockey player
- Joseph Lapchick, basketball player and coach; Original Celtics center; St. John's University and New York Knicks head coach; member of Basketball Hall of Fame
- Katie Ledecky, swimmer, 10-time Olympic medalist
- Al Leiter, former Major League pitcher
- Mark Leiter, former Major League pitcher
- Ivan Lendl, tennis player
- Isabelle Lendl, amateur golfer, daughter of Ivan Lendl
- Evan Frank Lysacek, figure skater; the 2010 Olympic champion and the 2009 World champion
- Connor Michalek, WWE fan suffered from Medulloblastoma of Greek-Czech descent
- Nicole Melichar, professional tennis player
- Stanley Frank Musial, of Czech mother, baseball player of international fame
- Martina Navratilova, Prague-born tennis player
- Joe Nemechek, NASCAR driver, grandfather was from Prague
- John Nemechek, NASCAR driver, brother of Joe Nemechek
- John Hunter Nemechek, NASCAR driver, son of Joe Nemechek
- Jay Novacek, football player
- Logan Ondrusek, baseball player
- Ken Patera, Olympic weightlifter and professional wrestler
- John Pesek, professional wrestler, known as 'The Nebraska Tiger Man'; inductee in the Professional Wrestling Hall of Fame (2005)
- Scott Podsednik, Major League Baseball player
- Nate Polak, soccer player
- Jeff Rohlicek, hockey player
- Jack Root from Frahelz, Bohemia, an American boxer, was first-ever World Light-Heavyweight Champion and later declared also the Heavyweight Champion of the World
- Blake Schilb, basketball player for the Czech national team by marriage
- Frank Secory, baseball player
- Joey Sindelar, professional golfer
- Eric Sogard, former Major League infielder
- Scott Touzinsky, volleyball player
- Terrin Vavra, baseball player
- Karl Wallenda, founder of the Flying Wallendas, with the Ringling Brothers and Barnum & Bailey Circus
- Kim Zmeskal, rhythmic gymnast, Olympic champion
- Paxton Pomykal, professional soccer player
- Sam Sulek, professional bodybuilder and social media influencer

== Visual art ==
- Charles Demuth, of Moravian ancestry, an artist; a notable painter who had major influence on American art by the introduction of modern European movements, such as cubism
- Harrison Fisher, of Bohemian ancestry, a popular commercial artist and illustrator of the cover of Cosmopolitan magazine from the early 1900s through 1934; known as 'The Father of a Thousand Girls'
- Wanda Gág, notable American illustrator and author of Bohemian descent
- Alexandr Hackenschmied, photographer, innovative cinematographer, Academy Award winner
- Leo Holub, photographer
- Antonín Kratochvíl, Czech-born American photojournalist
- Jan Matulka, painter
- Mario Korbel, sculptor
- Albin Polasek, sculptor
- Antonin Raymond, famed architect who explored traditional Japanese building techniques with the latest American building innovations
- Rudolph Ruzicka, prominent Czech-born American wood engraver, etcher, illustrator, typeface designer, and book designer
- Charles Sindelar, illustrator and painter
- Peter Sis, writer and illustrator of children's books
- Melanie Kent Steinhardt, painter and ceramicist
- Paul Strand, of Bohemian immigrant parents, one of the most important figures in American twentieth-century photography
- Ladislav Sutnar, graphic artist, considered one of the great pioneers of the modern period
- William Pachner, painter and illustrator

== Recreation ==
- Lubomir Kavalek, chess grandmaster
- Wilhelm Steinitz, Prague-born chess player and the first undisputed world chess champion from 1886 to 1894

== Sources ==
- Thomas Capek, The Čechs (Bohemians) in America. Boston & New York: Houghton Mifflin Co., 1920.
- Guido Kisch, In Search of Freedom. London: Edward Goldston, 1948.
- Vera Laska, The Czechs in America 1633–1977. Dobbs Ferry, NY: Oceana Publications, 1978.
- Miloslav Rechcigl, Jr., US Legislators with Czechoslovak Roots. Washington, DC, SVU Press, 1987.
- Miloslav Rechcigl, Jr., Czechs and Slovaks in America. Boulder, CO: East European Monographs, 2005.
- Miloslav Rechcigl, Jr., Czech American Bibliography. Bloomington, IN: AuthorHouse, 2011.
- Rechcigl, Miloslav Jr. (2013). Czech American Timeline: Chronology of Milestones in the History of Czechs in America. Bloomington, Indiana: Author House. ISBN 978-1-4817-5706-5.
