= National Czech & Slovak Museum & Library =

Archive organization in Iowa, US

Coordinates: 41.966150°N 91.661894°W

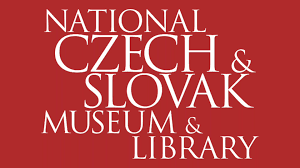

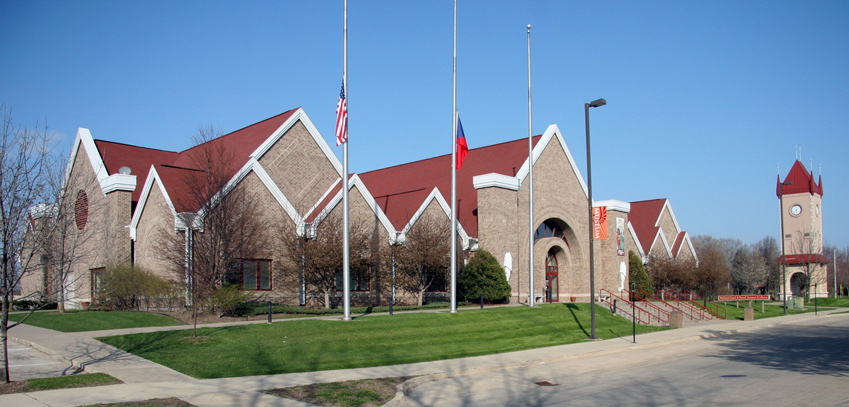
- Established: 1974
- Location: 1400 Inspiration Place SW; Cedar Rapids, Iowa
- President: Cecilia Rokusek
- Curator: Stefanie Kohn
- Website: ncsml.org

The National Czech & Slovak Museum & Library (NCSML) is a museum and library of Czech and Slovak history and culture located in Cedar Rapids, Iowa, in the United States. Established in 1974, the museum and library moved to its present site in 1983. The museum and library was severely affected by the Iowa flood of 2008. In 2012, rebuilding and expansion efforts were completed and the NCSML reopened. In 2018, the NCSML became a Smithsonian Affiliate, joining a network of museums, educational institutions, and cultural organizations that share Smithsonian resources. Dr. Cecilia Rokusek serves as the President & CEO of the museum since 2018.

== History: 1974 to 1995 ==
In 1974, several second and third-generation Czech Americans in the Cedar Rapids area founded the Czech Fine Arts Foundation to preserve their Czech heritage and culture. In 1978, the group's growing collection of artifacts and documents caused them to open a Czech Museum in a three-room house, where the museum attracted additional materials and volunteers. In 1981, the collections were moved to a new building on the museum's current site with the goal of permanent public display. In 1983, the group acquired a 2,200 square feet (200 m^{2}) 19th-century immigrant home and moved it to its property, where it was restored and furnished in the style of the 1880s and 1890s.

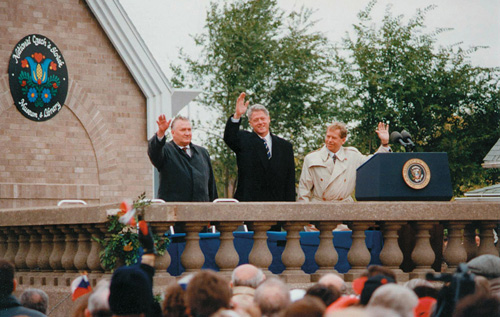
The presidents of the Czech Republic, Slovakia, and the United States dedicate the National Czech & Slovak Museum & Library in 1995.

From 1983 onwards, the museum began to employ staff, and during the 1980s gained additional artifacts and financial contributions from Czech and Slovak Americans. The museum adopted its current name during this period. By the 1990s, the museum and library were outgrowing its space, and plans for a new facility began, with an architect creating plans for a new 16,000-square-foot (1,500 m^{2}) building. Fundraising for the new facility began during this time. On October 28, 1993, groundbreaking took place for the new building. On October 21, 1995, the building was dedicated, with U.S. President Bill Clinton, Czech President Václav Havel, and Slovak President Michal Kováč presiding over the ceremony. Some 7,000 people attended the dedication event.

== Large exhibitions and reconstruction ==
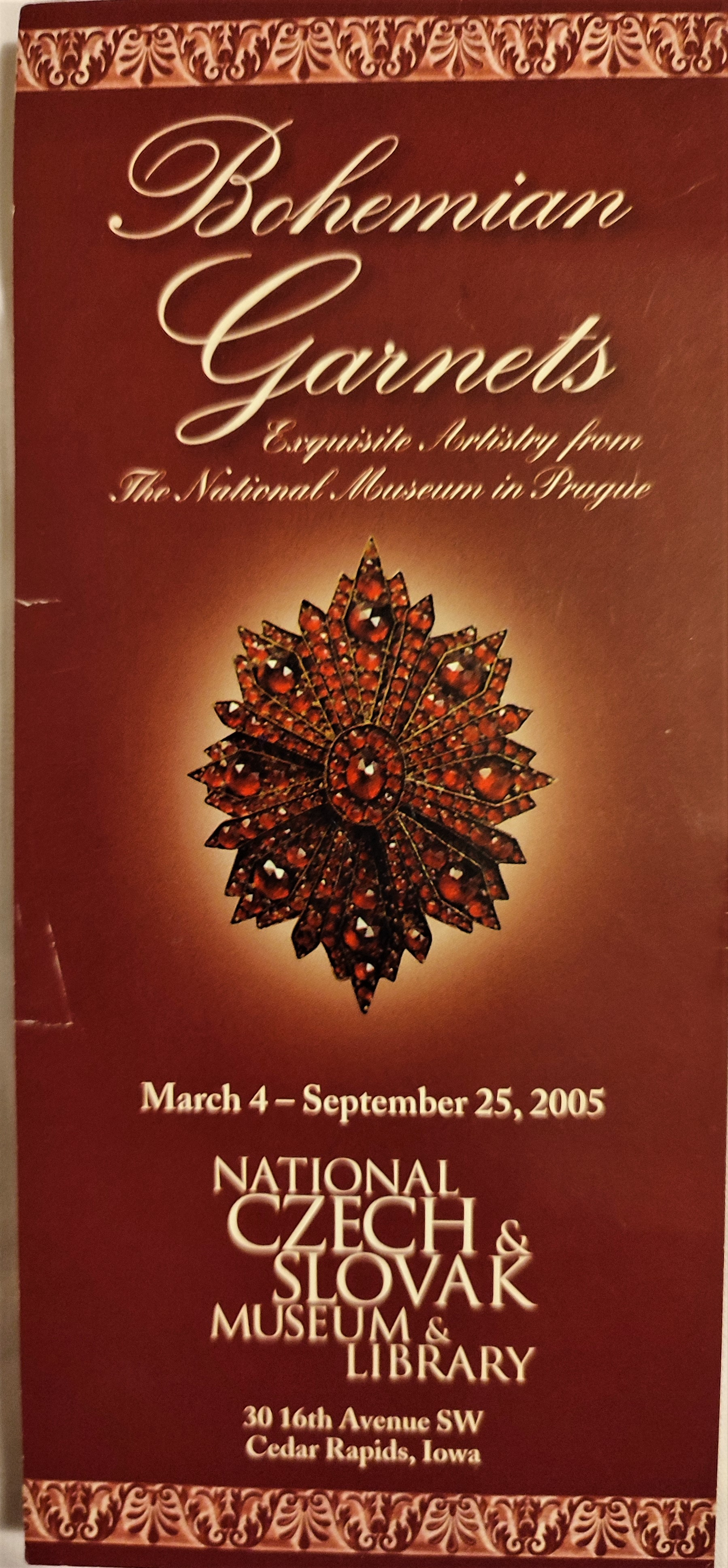
Invitation Card for the exhibition Bohemian Garnets

- On May 24, 1997, the NCSML opened an international exhibition: "A Thousand Years of Czech Culture: Riches from the National Museum in Prague," which centered on artifacts on loan from the National Museum in Prague. The museum stated that the exhibit attracted more than 30,000 visitors from around the U.S. and 22 countries. In 1998, a permanent exhibit, "Homelands: The Story of the Czech and Slovak People," opened. In 1999, the museum hosted its history and culture conference for the first time.
- In 2000, the museum underwent significant renovations and remodeling, including the addition of secure and climate-controlled storage facilities and a new venue for temporary exhibits, created by dividing the social/rental hall. In the same year, the library's collection doubled with the acquisition of the Slavic language collection from Benedictine University.
- Museum and library began publishing Slovo, a history and culture academic journal with biannual periodicity, ISSN 1545-0082.

In subsequent years, the museum continued to grow its collections, membership, and events schedule. In 2001, the museum began planning to acquire additional property for a research and performing arts center, and began a fundraising campaign to build its endowment to $5 million by 2005. The NCSML stated that its membership in 2002 was above 1,900 people. In 2002, the museum and library opened "Kroje—Dress for the Dance of Life!," an exhibit on Kroje which ran until January 19, 2003. The museum also hosted the annual meetings of the Czech Glass Collectors Guild and the Czech-Slovak Genealogical Society International during this time.

- On March 4, 2005, the museum opened an exhibition, "The Bohemian Garnets", which presented jewellery from renaissance to the present, dishes an other artifacts with the Czech national precious stone, on loan from the National Museum in Prague.

== 2008 flood and rebuilding ==
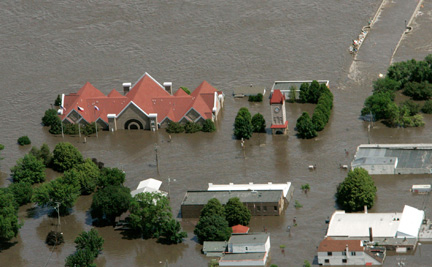
Flood in 2008

During the Iowa flood of 2008, the Cedar River overflowed its banks, flooding the museum and library with 8 feet (2.4 m) of water and causing severe damage to the exhibitions and contents. The damage was variously valued at $8 million or $9 million. The flood occurred just days before the museum was scheduled to reveal its choice among four proposals for a tripling in the size of the facility.

Museum staff were able to remove two trucks full of museum and library material before the flood. Fine art and folklore artifacts were prioritized for removal. Two exhibits were destroyed in the flood, including one about the Prague Spring in 1968 and the subsequent invasion of Czechoslovakia. In the immediate aftermath of the flood, artifacts were removed from the building's upper levels, which were not reached by floodwaters, and flood-damaged items were removed for restoration efforts, with some library books sent to Chicago to be freeze-dried and restored. The Chicago Conservation Center assisted by providing expert help in efforts to save textiles and linens.

At the time of the 2008 flood the museum was visited by about 35,000 people each year, with an annual economic impact of $1 million. The library held an estimated 30,000 Slovak and Slovak-related items in its library, two-thirds of which are stored off-site and were not affected by flood damage. Around 40 percent of the museum's artifacts are Slovak. The museum holds the largest collection of kroje outside Slovakia and the Czech Republic, with the oldest pieces dating to the 16th century.

During the flood the NCSML's entire collection of 5,000 phonograph records, documenting 80 years of recorded Czech and Slovak music, were damaged. The University of Iowa Libraries Preservation Department were able to repair and restore most of the records.

After the flood, a temporary facility was opened at Lindale Mall. The museum's temporary home was moved in April 2010 to the Kosek Building at 87 Sixteenth Avenue SW in Cedar Rapids, built in 1910. The interim space, including a gallery and museum gift shop, was opened. An exhibition, "Rising Above: The Story of the People and the Flood" also opened at that time. The exhibit focuses on the 2008 flood, comparing it to the previous floods of 1929 and 1993, and includes materials from the NCSML's Flood Oral History Project, an oral history project of the personal accounts of flood victims. The exhibit tells the story of the flood in conjunction with the history of Cedar Rapids, the Czech Village, and New Bohemia. The Kosek Building continues to be a part of the Museum and Library after the main building was rebuilt.

The Iowa General Assembly set aside $10 million to help the museum and library rebuild. In October 2008 the Czech ambassador presented a $405,000 donation from the Czech Republic for reconstruction efforts.

The flood damage caused the museum property to have difficulty obtaining insurance and exhibitions with materials on loan from other museums because of a fear of another flood. The museum decided to move and expand the museum to higher ground, rather than demolishing the original building, because the cost to move the 15-year-old building was $713,000, compared to an estimated $2 million to demolish and rebuild the structure. Despite the flood damage, the building remained structurally sound. The museum also stated that it wanted to preserve the original building for its historic value and avoid creating unnecessary landfill waste.

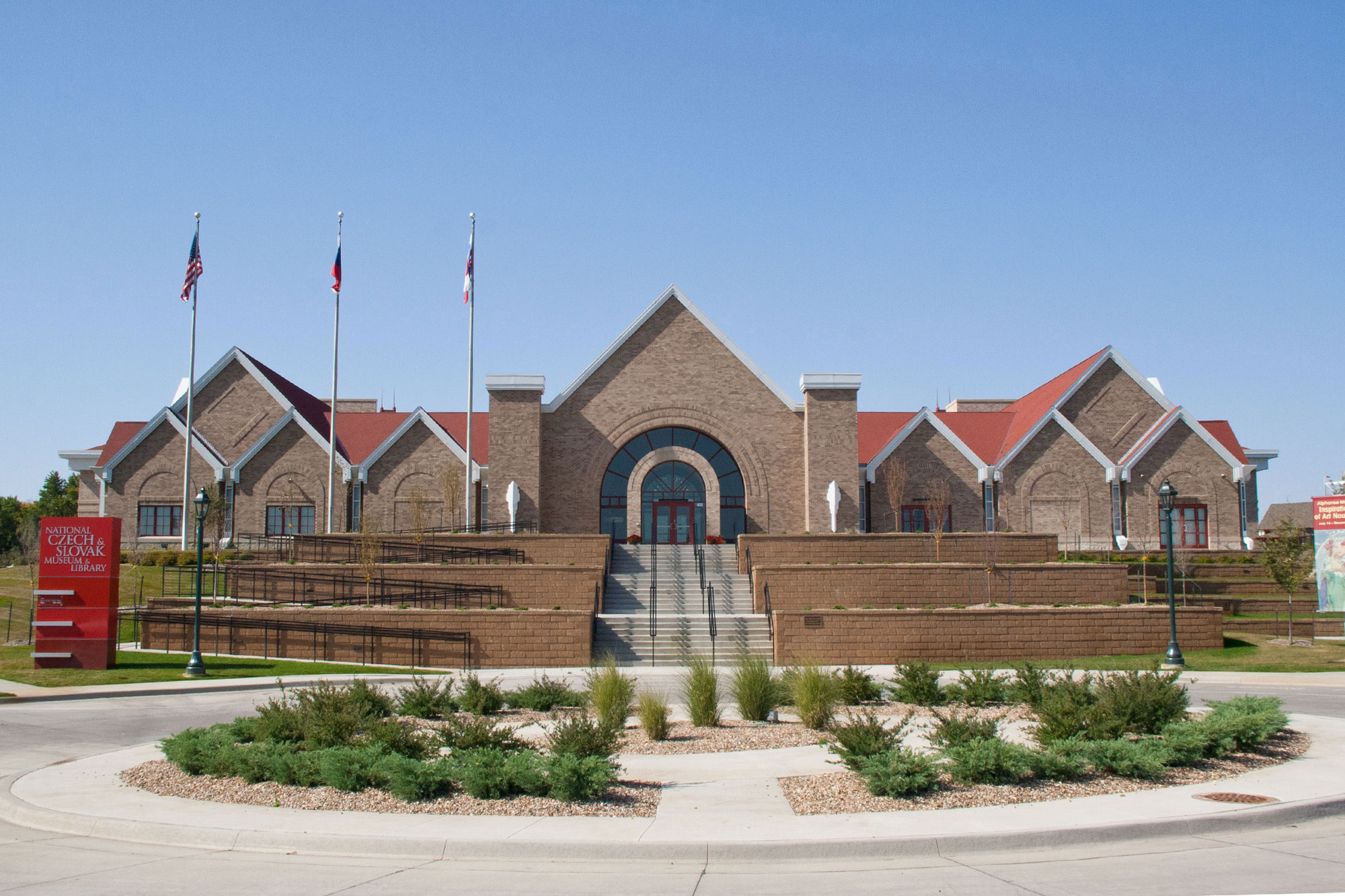
The New National Czech & Slovak Museum & Library

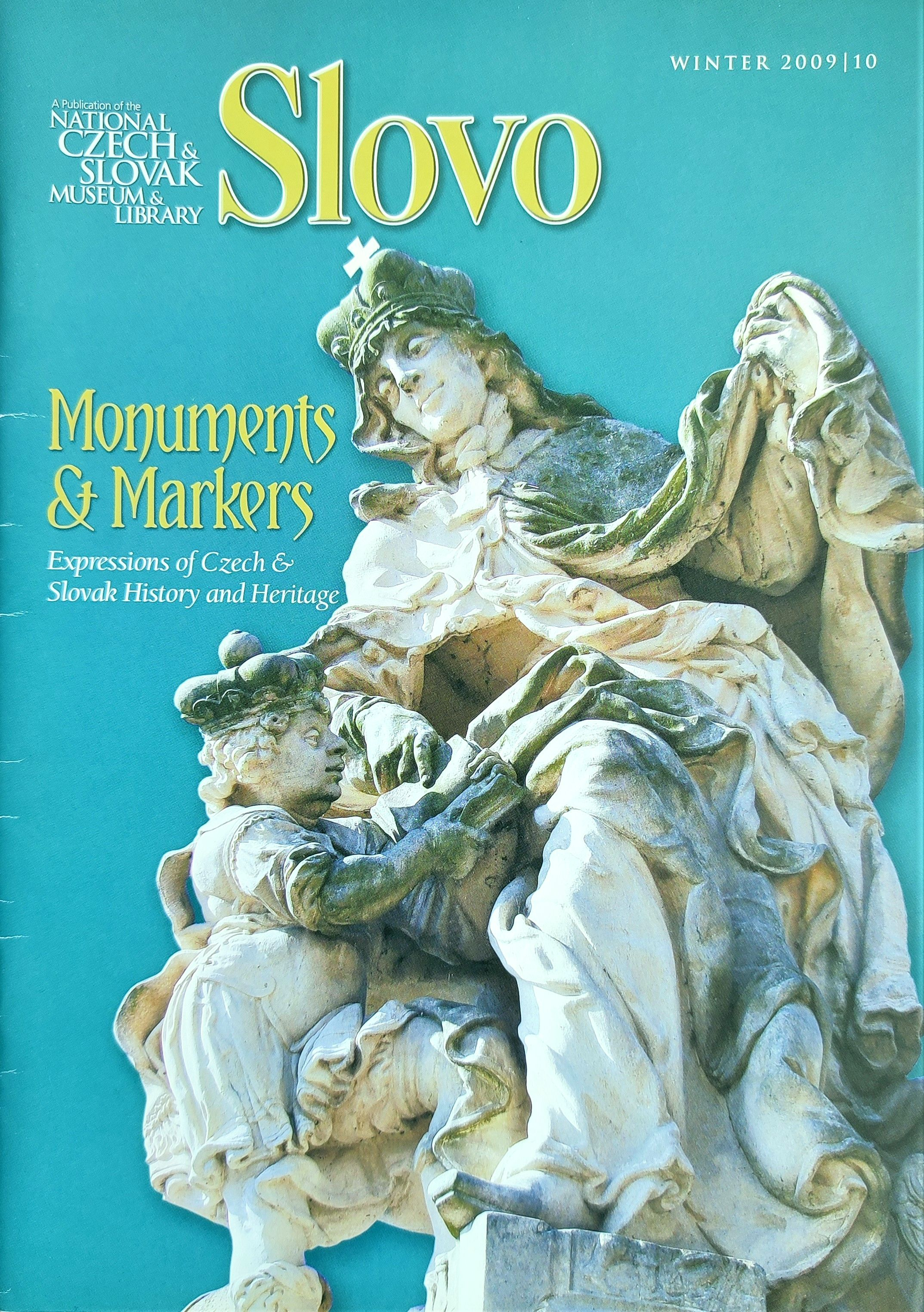
cover of the journal Slovo issued by NCSML biannually since 2000

The museum was moved 480 feet (150 m) from the original site and was placed on an elevated foundation. A groundbreaking ceremony was held on December 15, 2010. On June 8–9, 2011, the Museum and Library, weighing around 1,500 tons (1,400 metric tons) and constructed of a wood frame with brick veneer, was moved to the new site. The building new site is 11 feet (3.4 m) higher than the previous site and 3 feet (0.91 m) above the 2008 flood level. The museum dubbed the event "A Monumental Move" and set up a webcam for viewers to watch the move; the City of Cedar Rapids also shut down 16th Avenue SW, including the Bridge of Lions, so local residents could watch. The museum's contractor for the job, Jeremy Patterson Structural Moving, stated that "it's apparently the largest museum ever relocated for flood hazard mitigation, and probably the only museum ever elevated."

In addition to moving the first building to a new location, the rebuilt facility is significantly expanded, to a total of 50,000 square feet (4,600 m^{2}) including "larger permanent and temporary exhibition galleries, an expanded research library, educational programming space, a new museum store, collection storage, and work space." The new facility will be LEED-certified and will include a new 5,500-square-foot (510 m^{2}) library and archives, 51-seat theater, three galleries, public and educational programming space for up to 400 people, underground parking for 65 vehicles, a terrace with a view of the Cedar River and Cedar Rapids skyline, and an outdoor amphitheater. The rebuilding and recovery costs are estimated to be $25 million.

The NCSML was accredited by the American Alliance of Museums in November 2008. In 2010, the museum launched a capital campaign with a goal of raising $25 million to establish the Kosek Building as part of the NCSML's permanent collection, renovate The Immigrant Home and the Babi Buresh Center historic homes for tour, design and install a new permanent exhibition, recovery money spent by the museum and library on disaster cleanup; and grow the endowment to pay for operating expenses. The NCSML stated that following the museum's reopening, an estimated 54,000 visitors will visit annually and the economic impact on the Cedar Rapids area will be over $1.1 million.

== Buresh Immigration Tower and Astronomical Clock (Orloj) ==
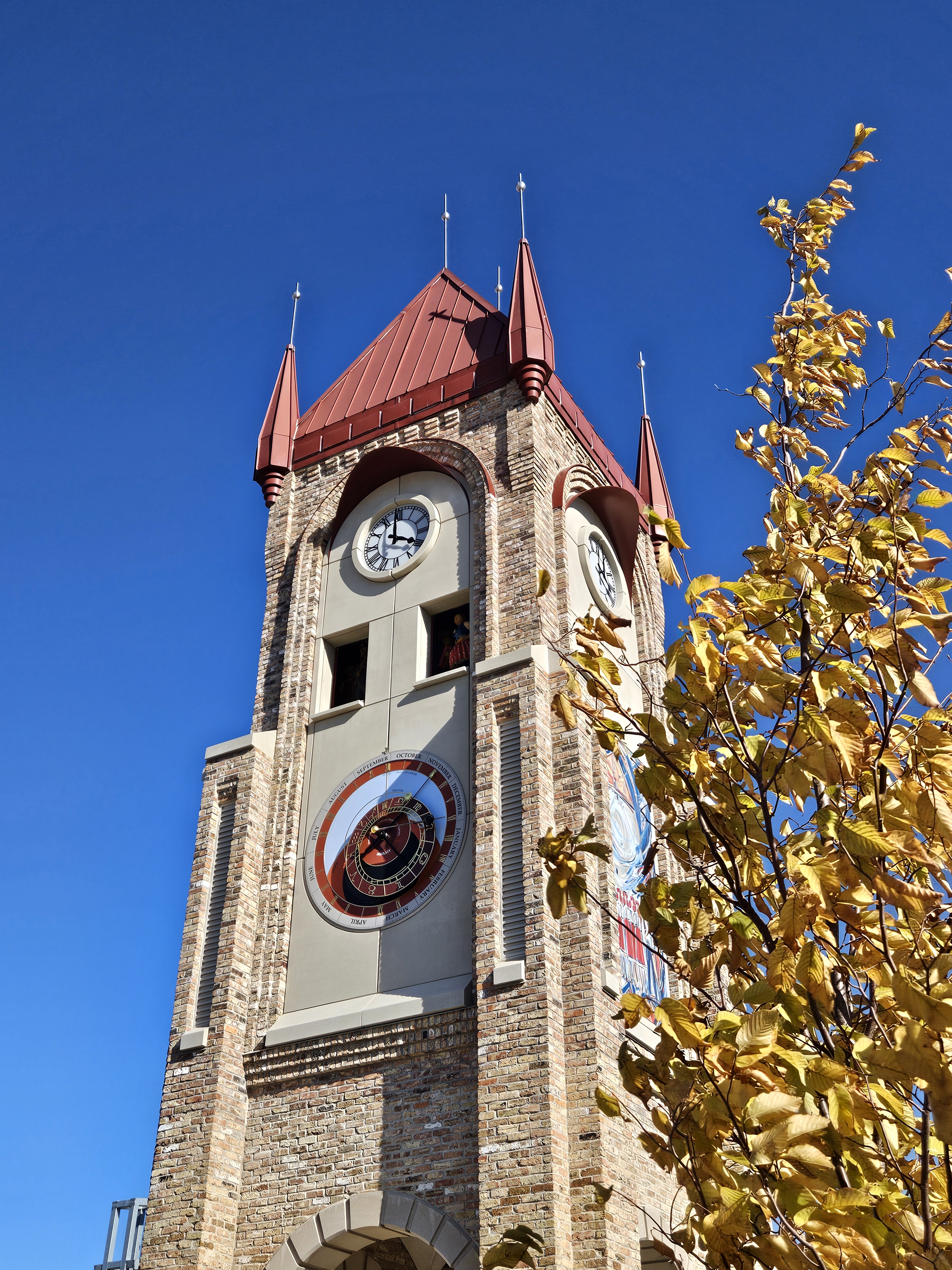
Buresh Immigration Tower with Orloj

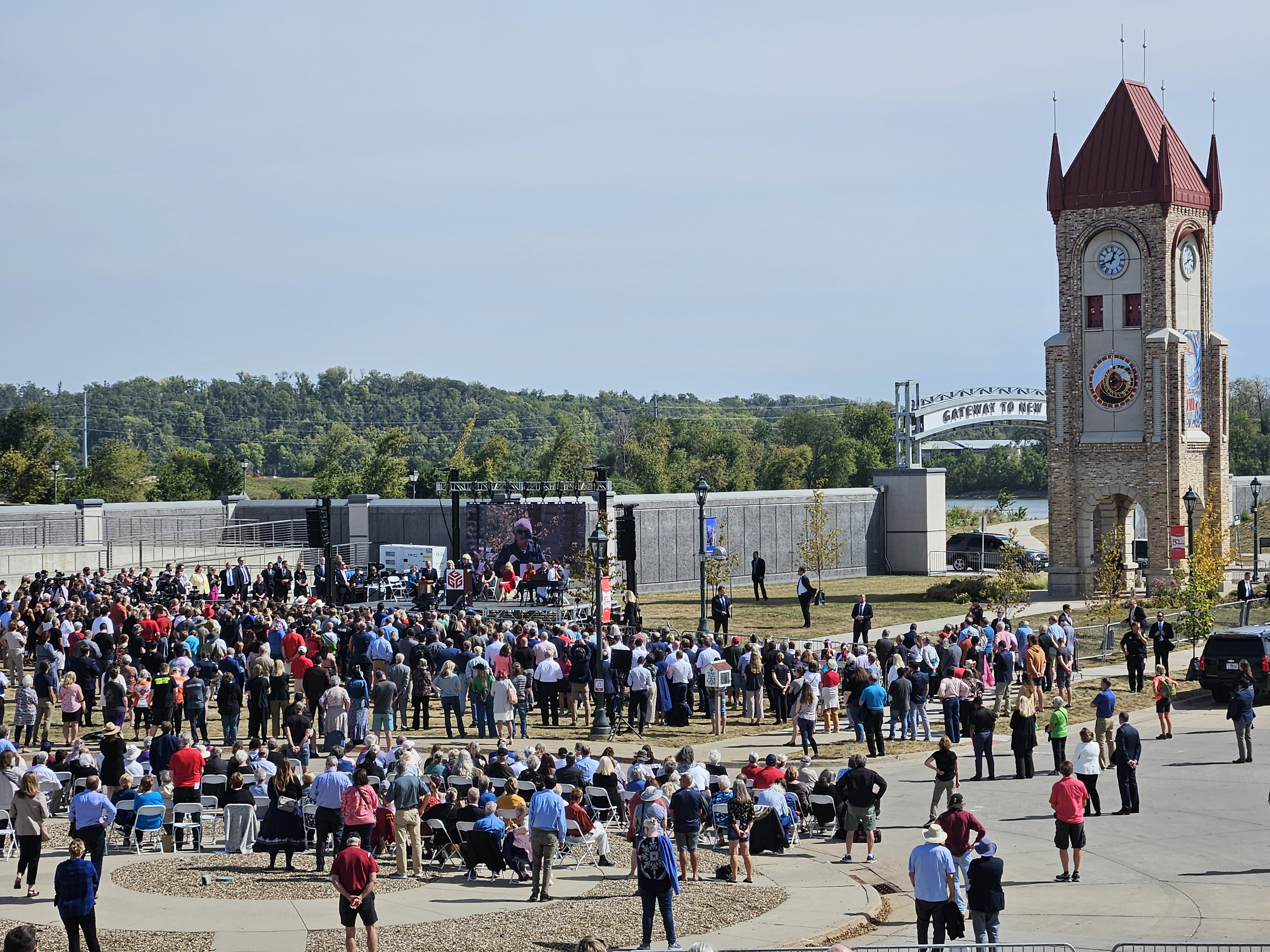
Dedication Ceremony of the Buresh Immigration Tower on September 27, 2024

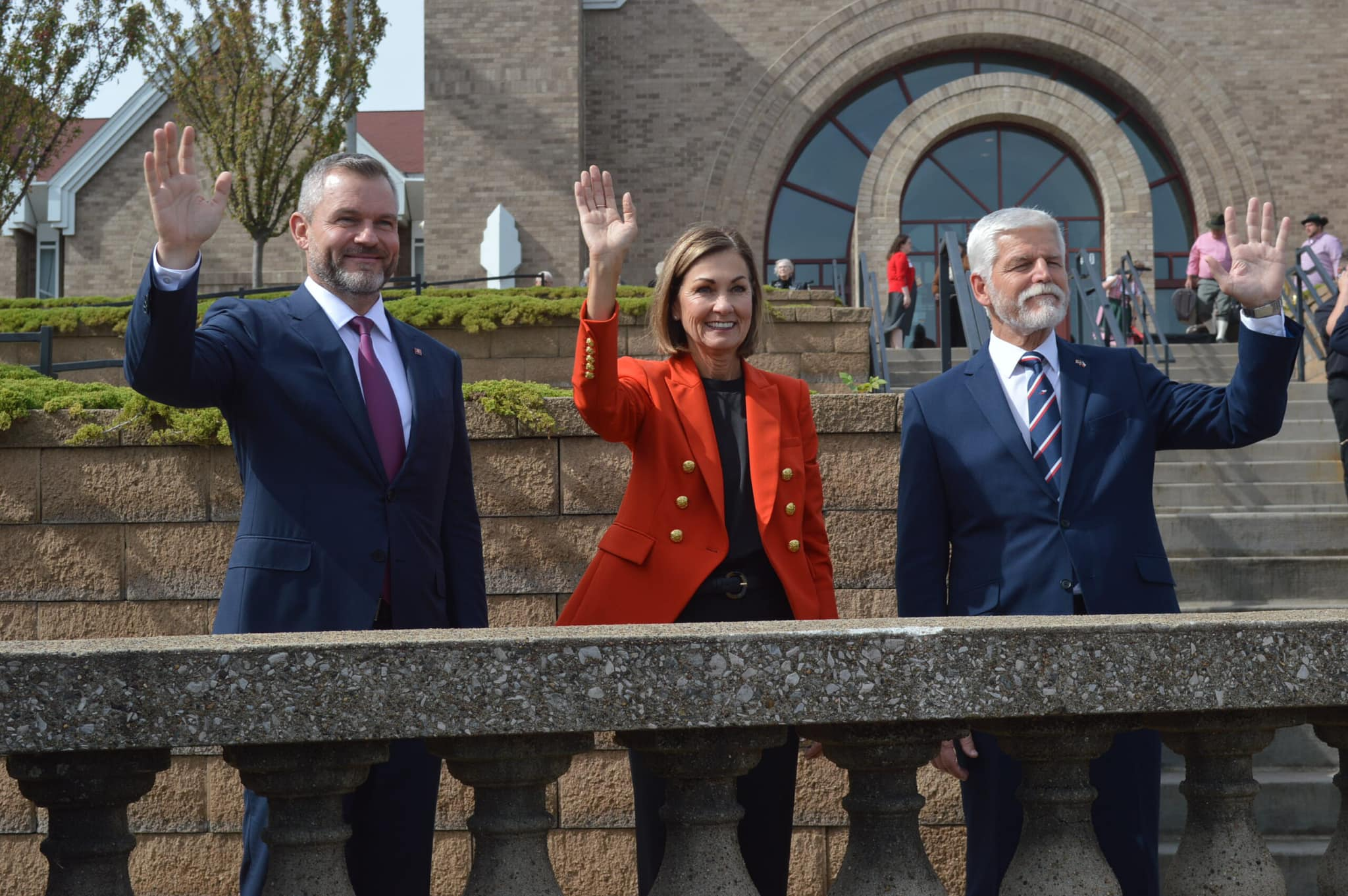
Slovak President Peter Pellegrini, Iowa Governor Kim Reynolds and Czech President Petr Pavel during the dedication ceremony on September 27, 2024

Nearly 30 years after President Bill Clinton, Czech President Václav Havel and Slovak President Michal Kovac visited the museum for a dedication in 1995, their modern counterparts Petr Pavel, President of the Czech Republic and Peter Pellegrini, President of Slovakia, returned September 27 to dedicate the only Prague-style astronomical clock — called an orloj — in the United States. The orloj includes 12 hand-carved figurines by Slovak artist Andrej Haršány symbolizing professions of Czech & Slovak immigrants to the United States. The figurines rotate on the hour to the music of Czech composers Antonín Dvořák and Bedrich Smetana. The clock tower is one of eight like it around the world, and the only one in North America and is named after the American-Czech banker and philanthropist Ernest J. Buresh.

== See also ==
- Czechoslovak Genealogical Society International
- A Merchantilist's memoir - diary (1625)
- Jamestown craftsmen
- List of Czech Americans
- List of Czechs
- Czech Americans
- List of Slovak Americans
- List of Slovaks
- 1619 Jamestown craftsmen strike
- Slovak Americans
