= August Klecka =

American politician

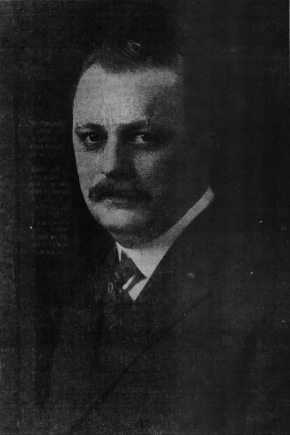
- Photograph of August Klecka in the Telegraf, March 28, 1919.

Baltimore City Council 2ndDistrict
- In office 1915–1933

Personal details
- Born: 2 February 1878 Baltimore, Maryland
- Died: 12 August 1946 (aged 68) Baltimore, Maryland
- Party: Democratic
- Spouse: Lillian
- Parent(s): Joseph Klecka (Father); Marie Hranicka Klecka (Mother)

August Klecka was an American politician and newspaper editor of Czech descent. He was a member of the Baltimore City Council from 1915 to 1933, representing Ward 7. Upon his election in 1915, Klecka became the first American of Czech descent to be elected to the Baltimore City Council. He was a leading personality in the Czech community and for Czech Democrats in Baltimore. Klecka represented Czech voters and ran the Slavic Building and Loan Association. He also performed as acting mayor of Baltimore for a time in 1931.

== Early life ==
Klecka was born on 2 February 1878. His father Josef Klečka (from Nehodiv) was a prominent figure in Baltimore. His mother Marie Hraničková was an immigrant from Kvášňovice. August's brother James was Chief Magistrate of the People's Court of Baltimore.

== Career ==
Starting in 1929, Klecka served as the editor of the Telegraf, a Czech-language newspaper in Baltimore.

He was appointed as Federal Marshal for the state of Maryland by Franklin D. Roosevelt, serving from 1933 to 1946.

In 1901, Klecka married Julia Lavicka at St. Wenceslaus Catholic Church. She died in 1931 while he served as acting mayor. In 1932, he married a widow, Lillian Lottes-Bricker, at the Methodist Episcopal Church in Frederick.

After Klecka's death in 1946, his wife Lillian took over his role as Ward 7's most important political figure.

== Gallery ==
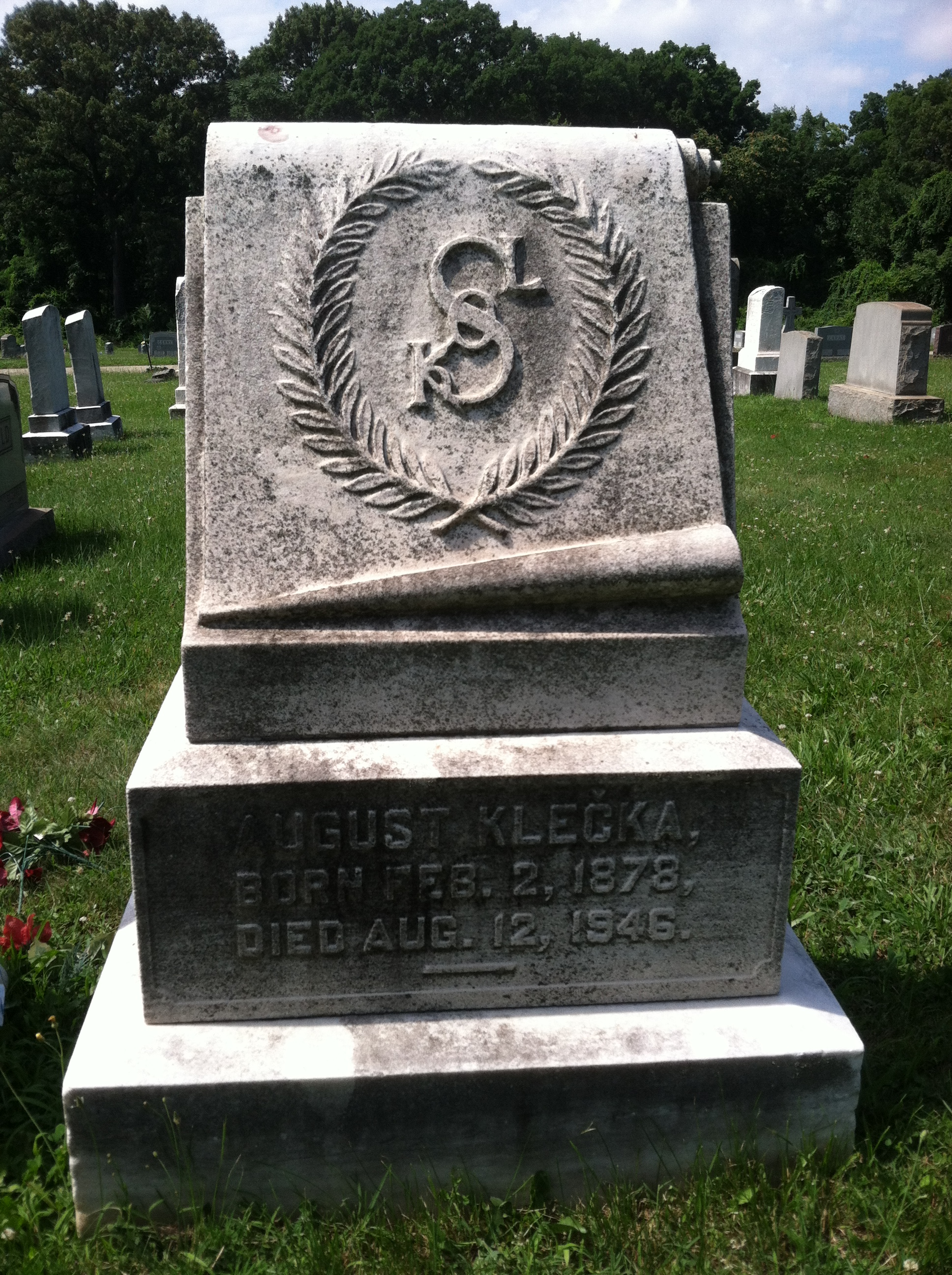
August Klecka's grave at the Bohemian National Cemetery in Baltimore.

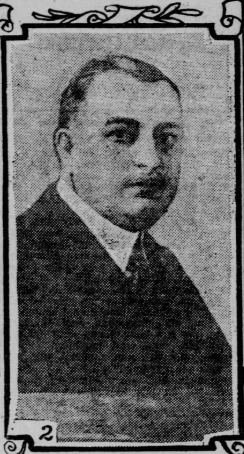
Photograph of August Klecka from an article in the Baltimore Sun, June 18, 1918.

== See also ==
- History of the Czechs in Baltimore
