= Bohemian National Cemetery =

Bohemian National Cemetery may refer to:

- Bohemian National Cemetery (Baltimore, Maryland)
- Bohemian National Cemetery (Chicago, Illinois)
