= Rosemarie Tong =

American feminist philosopher (born 1949)

Rosemarie Putnam Tong
- Born: Rosemarie Behensky; 19 July 1949 (age 76); Chicago, Illinois

Philosophical work
- School: Feminist philosophy, Feminist studies
- Institutions: Williams College, Lafayette College, Davidson College, University of North Carolina, Charlotte
- Main interests: Bioethics, Health care ethics, Genetic and reproductive technology

Rosemarie "Rosie" Tong is an American feminist philosopher. The author of 1998's Feminist Thought: A More Comprehensive Introduction, an overview of the major traditions of feminist theory, she is the emeritus distinguished professor of health care ethics in the Department of Philosophy at the University of North Carolina, Charlotte.

Tong's research is focused on ethical issues in long-term care, cognitive enhancement and genetics. She has been recognized for contributions to bioethics, health care reform, genetic and reproductive technology, and the implications of caregiving for parents and children, a role performed primarily by women.

== Early life ==
Tong was born Rosemarie Behensky in Chicago to Joseph J. Behensky (1924–2005) and Lillian Ann Nedved (1924–1981), both of Czech ancestry. Her paternal grandfather was an immigrant from Nehodiv.

== Education ==
Tong holds a BA in religious studies and German from Marygrove College, an MA in philosophy from Catholic University and a PhD from Temple University. Her MA thesis was on the 19th-century German philosopher Wilhelm Dilthey. She earned her PhD with a dissertation titled "Towards a Rational reconstruction of Anglo-American Criminal Law: The Insanity Defense."

== Career and affiliations ==
Tong has held professorships at Williams College and Lafayette College. She was the Thatcher Professor in Medical Humanities at Davidson College until 1999, when she began her professorship at the University of North Carolina.

She chaired the American Philosophical Association's Committee on the Status of Women from 2003 to 2007. From 1999 to 2002 she was the co-coordinator of the International Network for Feminist Approaches to Bioethics. Tong has also served as chair of the Institutional Review Board's Conflict of Interest Committee at Chesapeake Research, Inc., co-chair of the North Carolina Institute of Medicine's Task Force on Pandemic Influenza, and on the boards of the U.S. Women's Bioethics Project, the North Carolina Biotechnology Center and the Association for Practical and Professional Ethics.

Tong has been a consultant to the Advanced Center for Learning Studies, the Fulbright Foundation, the Hastings Center, the National Advisory Board on Ethics and Reproduction, and curricular programs involving medical humanities bioethics and women's studies. She has received grants from the Sloan Foundation, the Ford Foundation, the Fullerton Foundation and the National Endowment for the Humanities.

She has written 13 books and more than 100 papers, and was the series editor of the Point/Counterpoint series and the New Feminist Perspectives series from Rowman and Littlefield Press.

In Feminist Thought, Tong describes intersectionality and its importance to the globalization of feminism. Tong explains the different sections of feminism that have emerged throughout the years. Tong suggests that intersectionality represents the commitment of women and global feminists, regardless of culture, to "widen the scope of feminist thought." Although global feminism is defined by the sexual issues and gender discrimination of women, its personal twist stems from the political and economic disparities. "Third World" women are far more concerned with the latter disparities separating them from their privileged oppressors. The political agenda of the western world has direct implications on the globalization of the rest of the world, the "non-west."

== Personal life ==
Her first husband, Dr. Paul Ki King Tong, was a Chinese immigrant and professor at Glassboro State College. The couple had two sons. After Paul died in 1988, she married Jeremiah Putnam. Her son Paul died in 2013.

== Partial bibliography ==
=== Author ===
- New Perspectives in Healthcare Ethics: An Interdisciplinary and Crosscultural Approach (Basic Ethics in Action), Westview Press, Mar 3, 2006
- Feminist Approaches To Bioethics: Theoretical Reflections And Practical Applications, Westview Press, Dec 27, 1996
- Feminine and Feminist Ethics, Westview Press Mar 1, 1993
- Feminist Thought: A More Comprehensive Introduction, Westview Press, 1989

- Women, Sex, and the Law (New Feminist Perspectives),Dec 27, 1989
- Ethics in Policy Analysis (Occupational Ethics Series), Prentice-Hall, Jan 1986

=== Co-author and co-editor ===
- Globalizing Feminist Bioethics (co-authored with Aida Santos and Gwen Anderson)
- Feminist Philosophy: Essential Readings in Theory, Reinterpretation, and Application' (Co-edited with Nancy Tuana) Westview, 1994,
- Feminist Philosophies: Problems, Theories, and Applications (Co-edited with James Sterba and Janet Kourany) Prentice-Hall, 1991.
