= Bohemian National Cemetery (Baltimore) =

- Bohemian National Cemetery (Český-Národní Hrbitov)
- U.S. National Register of Historic Places
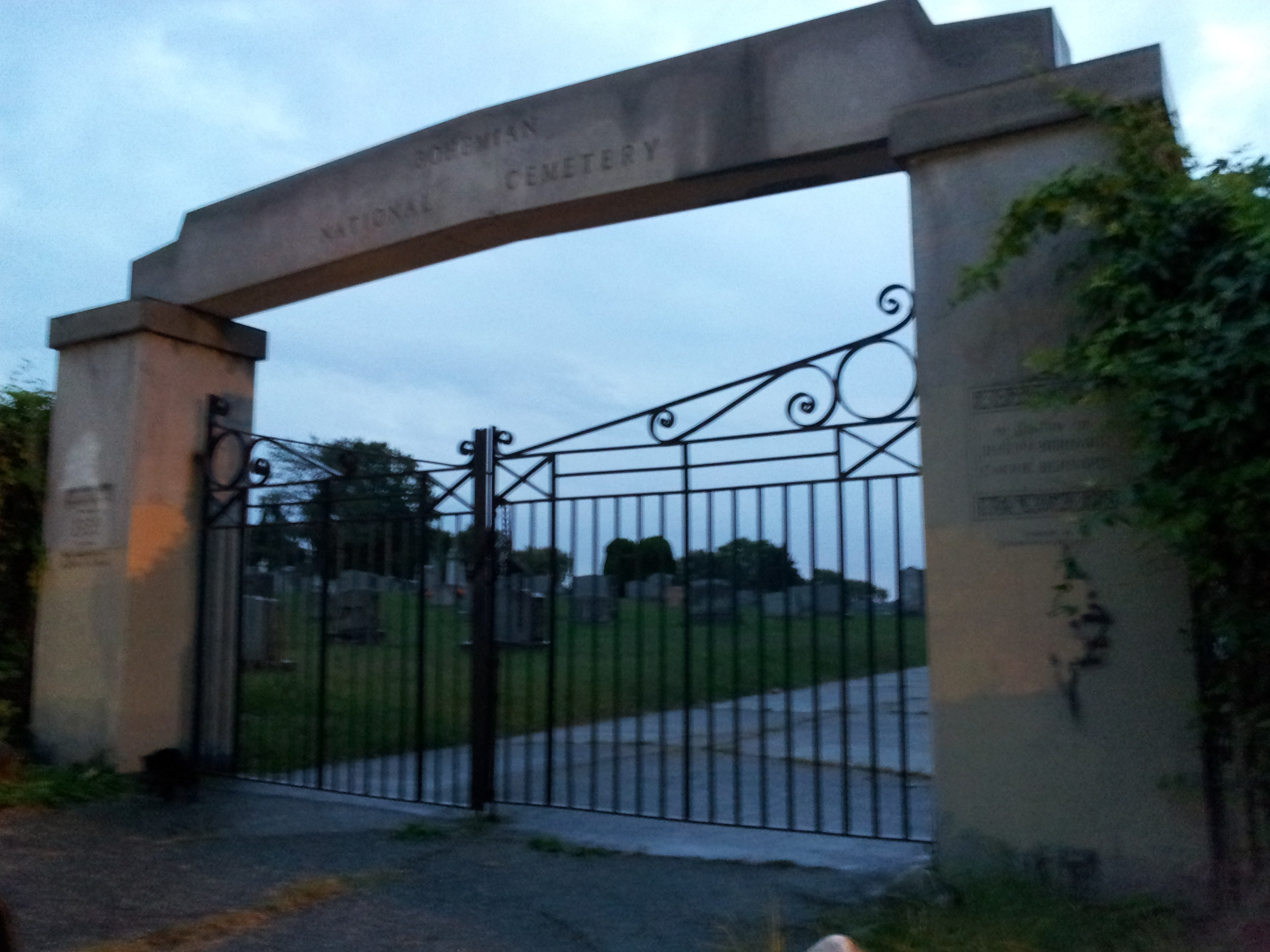

- Location within Baltimore Location within Maryland Location within the United States
- Location: 1300 Horners Lane, Baltimore, Maryland, United States
- Coordinates: 39°18′28″N 76°33′13″W
- Area: 12,410 acres (5,020 ha)
- Built: 1884
- NRHP reference No.: 10000910
- Added to NRHP: November 11, 2010

Bohemian National Cemetery (Czech: Český-Národní Hřbitov), also known as Oak Hill Cemetery, is a cemetery located at 1300 Horners Lane, Armistead Gardens in East Baltimore, Maryland.

== History ==
The cemetery was built in 1884 and was added to the National Register of Historic Places on November 11, 2010. It was established by members of Baltimore's Czech community as a burial ground for Protestant and irreligious Czechs. The property is owned by the Grand Lodge Č.S.P.S. of Baltimore Česko-Slovenská Podporující Společnost Benevolent Association of Baltimore, a chapter of the Czech-Slovak Protective Society. The C.S.P.S. is a benevolent society that was founded to help Czech and Slovak immigrants integrate into American society. The chapter was founded in 1880 by Vaclav Joseph Shimek, who was also the publisher of the Telegraf, the owner of Bohemian Hall, and a six-time president of Sokol Baltimore. Historically, buildings on the property were used to host social events, Sokol sports events, and other Bohemian/Czech cultural activities.

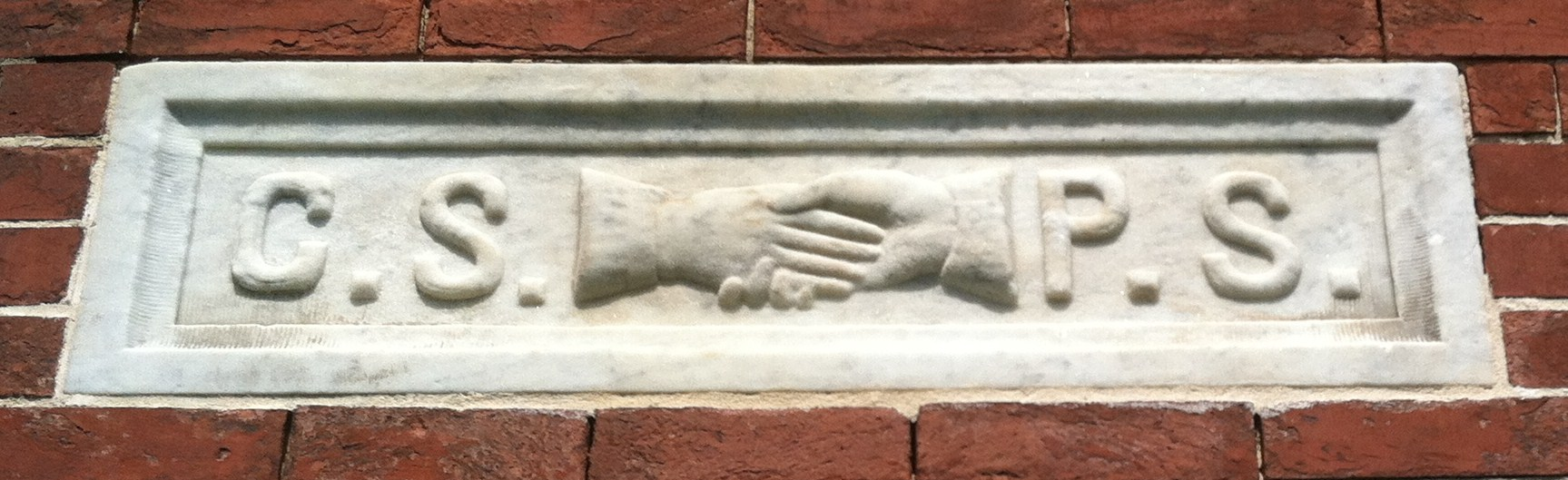
C.S.P.S. plaque on a crypt at Bohemian National Cemetery, June 2014.

Over the course of a decade, the Grand Lodge Č.S.P.S. President C. Jeanne Táborský and her organization have worked to maintain and repair the cemetery grounds and turn a small building at the cemetery into a museum and cultural center called the "Bohemians of Baltimore Museum". Since the neighborhood of Little Bohemia is long dispersed, the Bohemian National Cemetery is one of the few remnants of the Czech culture remaining in Baltimore, so the Č.S.P.S. has focused much of its energy on preserving the cemetery.

== Popular culture ==
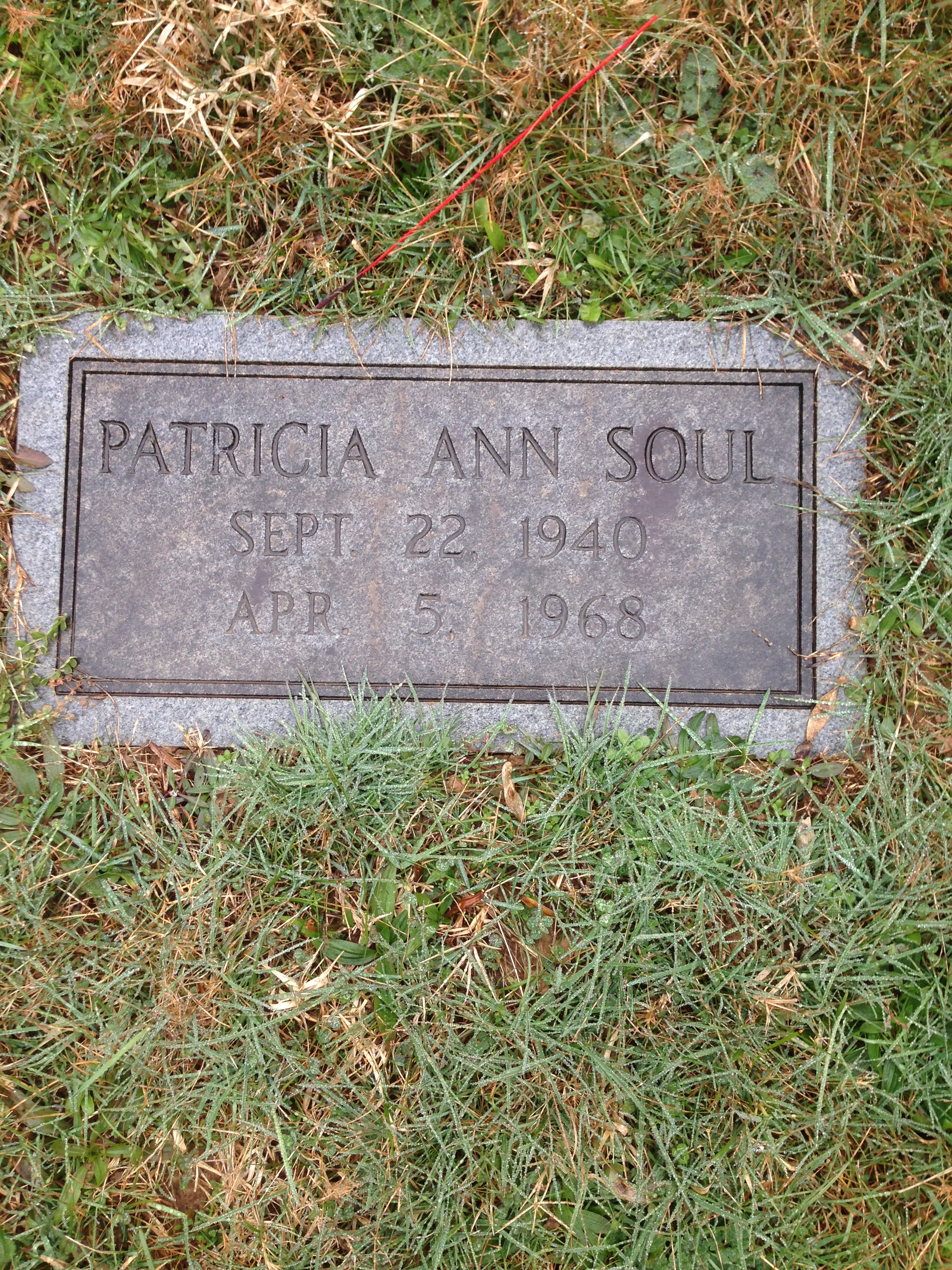
Maelcum Soul's grave at the Bohemian National Cemetery.

John Waters mentions both the cemetery and the surrounding neighborhood in his book Role Models:

Armistead Gardens, a neighborhood originally built as public housing for the influx of people coming to work in factories during World War II. It has been called a "white ghetto" of "row-ranchers," surprising in their "now outdated modernity." There is an amazing graveyard nearby where the star of my early movie Eat Your Makeup, Maelcum Soul, is buried. No one ever shops in Armistead Gardens.

== Notable interments ==
- William R. Jecelin, a soldier in the United States Army who posthumously received the United States Medal of Honor for his actions during the Korean War.
- August Klecka, politician and newspaper publisher.
- Maelcum Soul, actress in John Waters's early films Roman Candles and Eat Your Makeup.
- Dutch Ulrich, professional baseball player.

== See also ==
- Bohemian National Cemetery (Chicago)
- Czech-Slovak Protective Society
- Sokol movement in the United States
- Category:Burials at Bohemian National Cemetery (Baltimore)
