= Armistead Gardens, Baltimore =

Armistead Gardens
- neighborhood statistical area
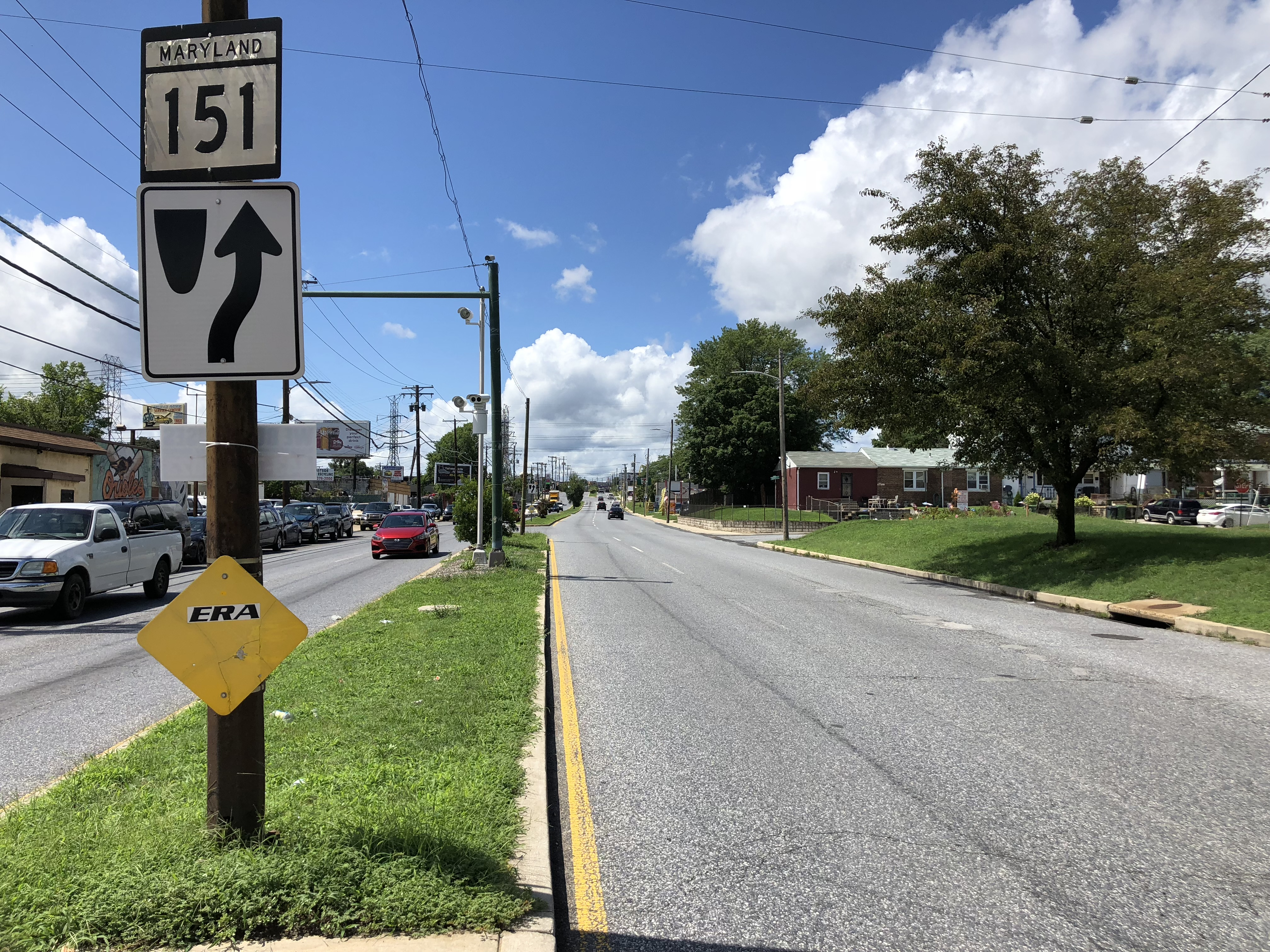
- View north along 4800 block of Erdman Avenue with houses in Armistead Gardens, Baltimore to the right

- Location within Baltimore
- Coordinates: 39°18′8″N 76°32′59″W
- Country: United States
- State: Maryland
- City: Baltimore

Area
  - Total: 0.529 sq mi (1.37 km^{2})
  - Land: 0.529 sq mi (1.37 km^{2})

Population (2009)
  - Total: 2,864
  - Density: 5,410/sq mi (2,090/km^{2})
- Time zone: UTC-5 (Eastern)
  - Summer (DST): UTC-4 (EDT)
- Area code: 410, 443, and 667

Armistead Gardens is a neighborhood in the Northeast District of Baltimore. It is located north of Pulaski Highway and east of Erdman Avenue, between Herring Run Park (northeast) and the East District neighborhood of Orangeville (southwest).

Armistead Gardens is home to four churches, Armistead Gardens Elementary School, and the Bohemian National Cemetery. The nearest major highways are Pulaski Highway (U.S. Route 40) and Erdman Avenue.

== History ==
Known as the White Ghetto, it was originally built by the Housing Authority of Baltimore City as public housing for white people coming to work in industries supplying World War II. Most of these white workers were from states of Appalachia such as West Virginia, Kentucky, and Tennessee and came to Baltimore to work at Glenn L. Martin Company and other major defense plants. The first section was built in 1939, with two additions in 1941. Even though it is only 60 years old, many of the homes are destroyed and many have moved out. In 1956 a cooperative (Armistead Homes Corporation) was formed by the residents and the 1500 homes were acquired from the Housing Authority. Because of the unit construction with common utilities, homes are not individually owned, but rather members have a 99-year lease with two 99 year options. Many of the current members are third and fourth generation.

== Demographics ==
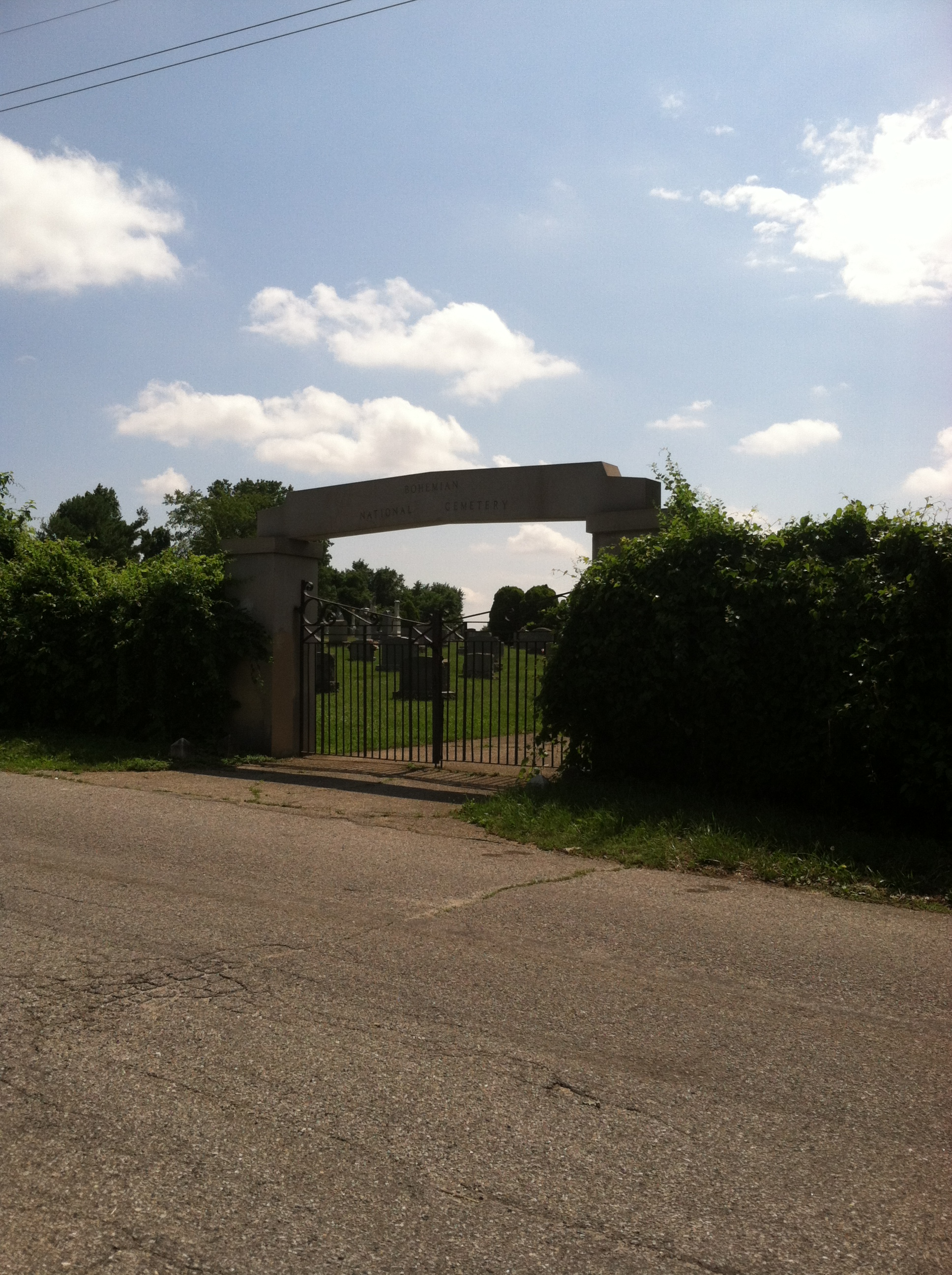
Bohemian National Cemetery, a Czech-American cemetery in Armistead Gardens.

As of the census of 2008, there were 3,150 people living in the neighborhood. The racial makeup of Armistead Gardens was 81.4% White, 1.0% African American, 1.0% Native American, 1.0% Asian, 2.7% from other races, and 4.0% from two or more races. Hispanic or Latino of any race were 10.0% of the population. 65.0% of occupied housing units were owner-occupied. 35.0% of housing units were vacant.

20.0% of the population were employed, 12.1% were unemployed, and 55.9% were not in the labor force. The median household income was $15,123. About 42.8% of families and 34.5% of the population were below the poverty line.

== Popular culture ==
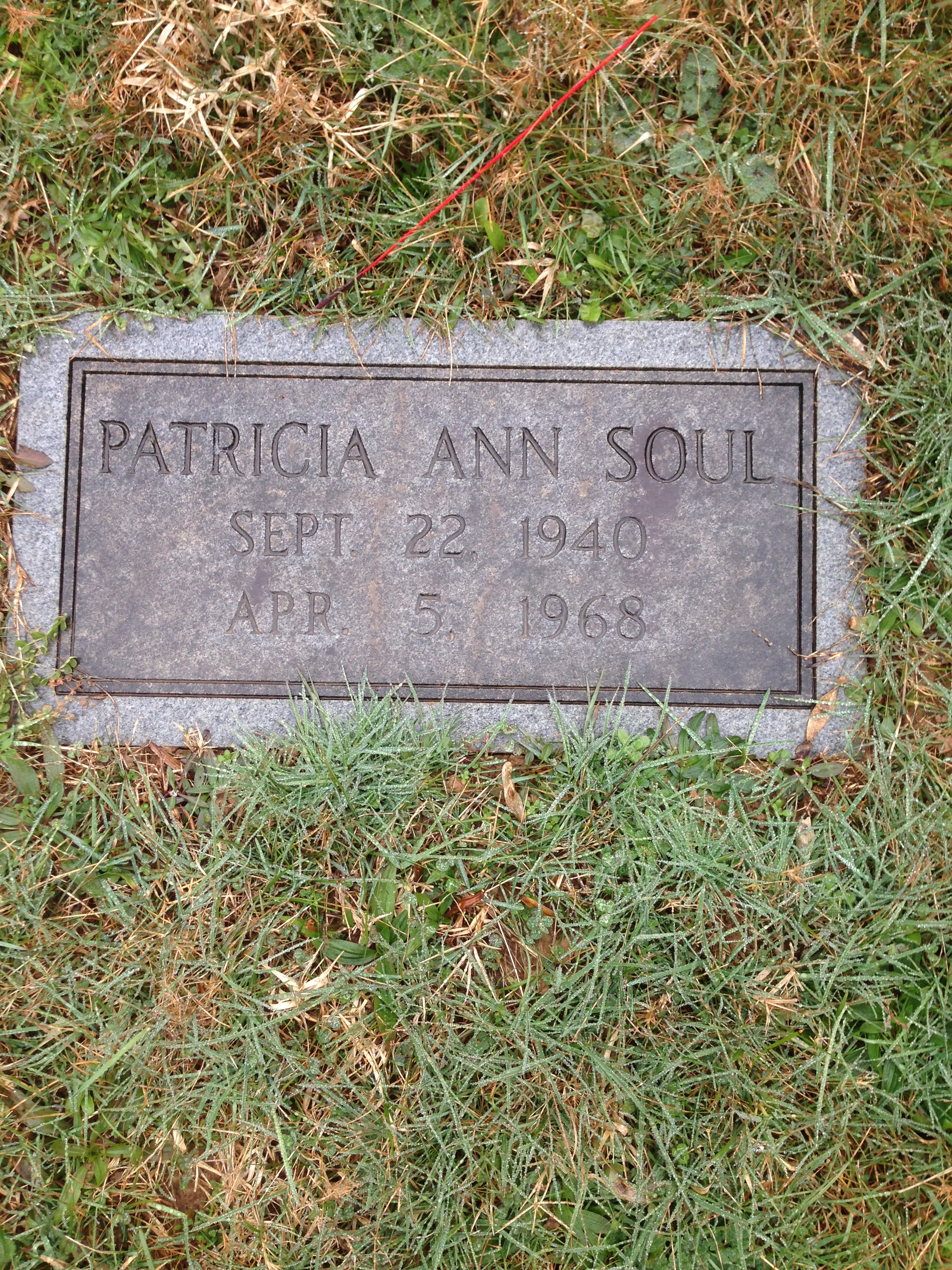
Maelcum Soul's grave at the Bohemian National Cemetery.

John Waters mentions both the neighborhood and the Bohemian National Cemetery in his book Role Models:

Armistead Gardens, a neighborhood originally built as public housing for the influx of people coming to work in factories during World War II. It has been called a "white ghetto" of "row-ranchers," surprising in their "now outdated modernity." There is an amazing graveyard nearby where the star of my early movie Eat Your Makeup, Maelcum Soul, is buried. No one ever shops in Armistead Gardens.

== See also ==
List of Baltimore neighborhoods
