= Dutch Ulrich =

Czech-American baseball player (1899-1929)

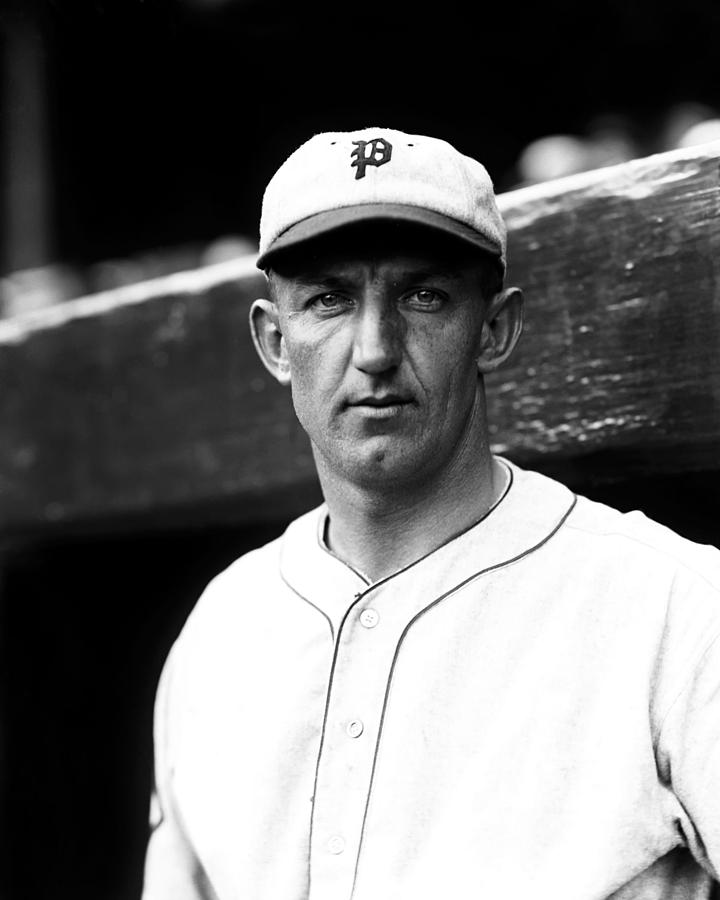
- Pitcher
- Born: November 18, 1899; Wiener Neudorf, Austria
- Died: February 11, 1929 (aged 29); Baltimore, Maryland, U.S.
- Batted: Right Threw: Right

MLB debut
- April 18, 1925, for the Philadelphia Phillies

Last MLB appearance
- October 1, 1927, for the Philadelphia Phillies

MLB statistics
- Pitching record: 19-27
- ERA: 3.48
- Strikeouts: 123
- Stats at Baseball Reference

Teams
- Philadelphia Phillies (1925 – 1927)

Frank W. "Dutch" Ulrich (November 18, 1899 – February 11, 1929) was a Czech-American professional baseball player who played three seasons for the Philadelphia Phillies from 1925 through 1927. In 1927, he had the seventh-best earned run average (ERA) in the National League (NL). He batted and threw right-handed.

Born to Czech immigrants in Austria, Ulrich and his family eventually moved to Baltimore, Maryland, where he got his start in pitching with the Baltimore Orioles, a minor league team. He pitched for several more minor league teams from 1922 through 1924 before the NL's Philadelphia Phillies added him to their roster in 1925. Ulrich appeared in 21 games for them that year, posting a 3–3 record and a 3.03 ERA. In 1926, he tied for fourth in the NL with 45 games pitched. He would emerge as one of Philadelphia's best pitchers in 1927, only posting an 8–11 record but finishing among the NL's ERA leaders despite the fact that his team lost 103 games. Ulrich would not have the chance to build off this success in 1928, as he was stricken with tuberculosis. The disease killed him in 1929 at the age of 29. In his three-season career, Ulrich had a 19–27 record, a 3.48 ERA, 123 strikeouts, 89 walks, and 452 hits allowed in 406 innings pitched.

== Early life ==
František (Franz) Ulrich was born in Wiener Neudorf, Austria, the third child to Czech migrants Václav Ulrich from Horní Lhota and Josefa Sedláková from Čermná. His father died when he was less than a year old so his family returned to Bohemia before eventually moving to Baltimore, Maryland. Upon coming to the United States, Ulrich americanized his name to the more common "Frank" and gained the nickname "Dutch."

== Minor league career ==
Uhlrich started his baseball career with the Baltimore Orioles of the International League. A pitcher, he struggled with locating where he threw the ball, leading to his eventual release. In 1920, he appeared in 38 games as a catcher with the Milwaukee Brewers of the American Association. He batted .277 with 31 hits, four of which were doubles and three of which were triples. Thereafter, he served mainly as a pitcher.

In 1922, Uhlrich pitched 14 games for the Moline Plowboys of the Class B Three-I League. He had a 6–5 record and a 4.19 earned run average (ERA), allowing 96 hits in 86 innings pitched. The following year, he pitched one game for the Quebec Bulldogs of the Class B Eastern Canada League, though an exact record of how he fared is unavailable. In the fall of 1923, he pitched for Brooks' All-Stars, a Baltimore-based team in a semipro industrial league. Recently acquired catcher Walt Lerian, who became good friends with Ulrich, noticed that the pitcher's velocity, location, and control were the best of all the ballplayers he had caught in semipro ball that year.

Uhlrich appeared in 35 games in 1924 as a starting pitcher for the Waterbury Brasscos of the Class A Eastern League, posting a 17–13 record. Uhlrich ranked among the Eastern League leaders with 17 wins (tied with Kent Greenfield and Moose Fuller for seventh), a 2.87 ERA (sixth), and 276 innings pitched (ninth). Baseball historian Frank Russo indicates that Uhlrich played for the Waynesboro Villagers of the Blue Ridge League sometime before 1925; if he did, Baseball-Reference.com does not have statistics from his tenure with the Villagers.

== Philadelphia Phillies ==
=== 1925 ===
In 1925, the Philadelphia Phillies of the National League added Ulrich to their roster. He made his major league debut with them on April 18, pitching a scoreless inning and striking out a batter in a 14–13 victory over the Boston Braves. He served as a relief pitcher in the first part of the season, not pitching more than 3 1/3 innings in a game through July. On June 30, he relieved Huck Betts to start the ninth inning of a game in which the Phillies trailed the Brooklyn Robins by a score of 9–7. Philadelphia tied the game in the bottom of the inning, and Ulrich, after pitching a scoreless ninth, threw a scoreless 10th. Milt Stock led off the 11th inning with a double against Ulrich but was retired in an unusual double play. Zack Wheat hit the ball back to Ulrich, and Stock was caught in a rundown between second and third. Amidst the confusion, Wheat tried to go to second base and was retired with Stock still active on the basepaths; Stock was then retired trying to go to third. Ulrich finished his third scoreless inning of work and was credited with his first major league win when Jimmie Wilson hit a game-winning single in the bottom of the inning. After July 15, Ulrich was sent back to Waterbury, where he won six of seven decisions and posted a 1.00 ERA in 63 innings of work.

In September, Ulrich rejoined the Phillies and was added to their starting rotation. He pitched 10 innings in his first start back on September 4, giving up six runs in a 6–5 loss to the New York Giants. After that, he did not complete another start until the second game of an October 3 doubleheader, when he gave up nine hits but no runs in a 3–0 victory over the Giants, his first major league shutout. In 21 games (four starts), he had a 3–3 record, a 3.05 ERA, 29 strikeouts, 12 walks, and 73 hits allowed in 65 innings pitched. Though his winning percentage was just .500, this was the closest he would ever come to having a winning season in the major leagues.

=== 1926 ===
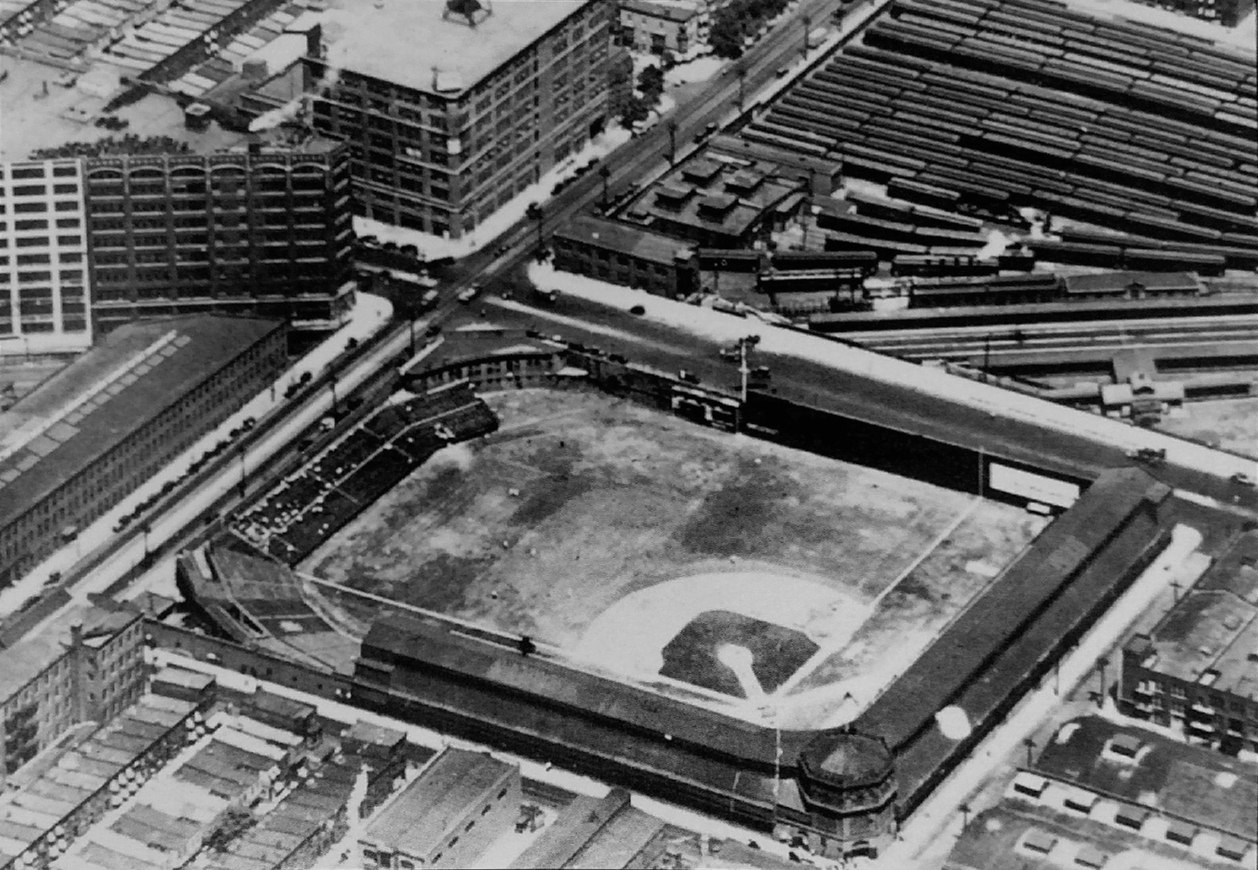
The Phillies played at the Baker Bowl during Ulrich's tenure with them.

Ulrich began 1926 as a relief pitcher but was used as a starter during the season as well. Many of his starts came from June 24 through July 22; after starting the year with an 0–5 record, he got his first win on June 28, holding Brooklyn to four runs in a complete game, 9–4 victory. He had a 4–3 record and a 3.55 ERA during this stretch. After being used more in relief in August, he served exclusively as a starter in September. His record was 4–12 through August 24, but Ulrich then won four games in a row. On September 1, he held the Braves to four hits in his only shutout of the season, a 3–0 triumph. He held the Cincinnati Reds to six hits and one run in a complete game, 5–1 victory on September 25. In 1926, Ulrich had an 8–13 record, a 4.08 ERA, 52 strikeouts, 37 walks, and 178 hits allowed in 147 2/3 innings pitched. He made 45 appearances for the Phillies in 1926, tied with Jakie May for the fourth-highest total among NL pitchers (behind Jack Scott's 50 and Claude Willoughby's and Pete Donohue's 47). However, his 13 losses tied him with sixth other pitchers for 10th in the league.

=== 1927 ===
As he had in 1926, Ulrich began 1927 as a relief pitcher. He only pitched three times in April and May. Though he made three starts from May 28 through June 9 and a fourth start on July 3, the rest of his appearances through July 20 all came in relief. Beginning with a start on July 22, 14 of his final 16 outings were starts. On August 5, Ulrich entered a game against the Pittsburgh Pirates with one out in the seventh inning, runners on second and third base, and the Pirates down by only two runs after already scoring three times in the inning. He got future Hall of Famer Kiki Cuyler to hit into a double play which scored a run but ended the inning. In the ninth, with Philadelphia up 9–6, Ulrich allowed a couple of singles, and the Pirates loaded the bases with one out. Future Hall of Famer Lloyd Waner hit into a fielder's choice to score a run, and Cuyler came to bat again. This time, Ulrich struck him out, preserving the 9–7 victory. In the first game of an August 13 doubleheader, he threw his only shutout of the season, against Boston once again in a 7–0 victory. He had back-to-back one-run complete games on August 22 and 27. In the first, he held the St. Louis Cardinals to four hits but suffered the loss, as future Hall of Famer Jesse Haines threw a shutout. In the latter, which was the first game of a doubleheader, he allowed seven hits and was the benefit of two runs as he defeated the Chicago Cubs by a score of 2–1. From August 5 through September 5, though his record was only 3–4, he posted a 1.14 ERA. This brought his ERA for the season down to 2.64; it was still under three until his final game of the season, the second game of a doubleheader against Boston on October 1, when he gave up eight runs in eight innings in an 8–6 loss. In 32 games (18 starts), he had an 8–11 record, 42 strikeouts, 40 walks, and 201 hits allowed in 193 1/3 innings pitched. He finished seventh in the NL with a 3.17 ERA despite pitching for a Phillies team that lost 103 games. Ulrich's 4.6 Wins Above Replacement figure was eighth among NL pitchers, his walks plus hits per innings pitched figure of 1.247 ranked 10th, his 1.862 walks per nine innings pitched ranked ninth, and he did not commit an error on the mound all season. After the season, he finished 23rd in the vote for the NL Most Valuable Player Award voting.

== Illness and death ==
In 1928, the Phillies signed Lerian to catch for them. Ulrich and Lerian would never play together in the major leagues, however, because the pitcher missed the 1928 season with an illness contracted in February. Newspaper reports correctly identified it as double pneumonia, but this was on top of tuberculosis. Ulrich kept it a secret from the general public that he was consumptive. The illness kept him confined to Franklin Square Hospital for several weeks, but later in the year, he was able to begin training in hopes of recovering enough to pitch again in 1929. His condition relapsed slightly that autumn, and in January 1929, it began to rapidly deteriorate. On February 11, 1929, Uhlrich died in Baltimore at the age of 29. Though newspaper articles said he had died of pneumonia and pleurisy, tuberculosis and cardiac exhaustion were the actual causes, according to the death certificate. Ulrich is buried at the Bohemian National Cemetery in Baltimore.

In his three-season career, Ulrich had a 19–27 record, a 3.48 ERA, 123 strikeouts, 89 walks, and 452 hits allowed in 406 innings pitched.
