= Czechoslovak Genealogical Society International =

Czechoslovak Genealogical Society International (CGSI) is a non-profit, volunteer organization dedicated to promoting genealogical research and interest in heritage among descendants of ethnic groups of former Czechoslovakia (Bohemians, Moravians, Silesians, Czech-Germans, Slovaks, Slovak Hungarians, Carpatho-Ruthenians, and Czech and Slovak Jews). Established in 1988 and based in St. Paul, Minnesota, CGSI is the oldest and largest society of its kind with more than 2,000 members from across the United States, Canada, and Czechia and Slovakia. Until its incorporation in 1991, it was known as Czechoslovak Genealogical Society and was a part of the Minnesota Genealogical Society.

The CGSI collection in Mendota Heights, Minnesota contains resources for genealogical research, and CGSI publishes the quarterly newsletter Naše rodina (from Czech: Naše rodina, i.e. "Our family"). CGSI also organizes seminars and workshops and a biennial genealogical conference attended by several hundreds of people. The conference is usually held in the United States, but in 2005 it took place in Bratislava and Prague under the title "Back to the Homeland".

In April 1999, CGSI President Dave Pavelka accepted a Silver Presidential Commemorative Medal from Václav Havel, then president of the Czech Republic, for the society's work in preserving Czech culture. In August 2019, CGSI received the Prize of Milan Hodža for the society's work in preserving Slovak culture.

Other Czech-American genealogical societies are the Czech and Slovak American Genealogy Society of Illinois (CSAGSI), the Czech and Slovak Genealogical Society of Arizona (CSGSA), and the Texas Czech Genealogical Society.

== See also ==
- National Czech & Slovak Museum & Library (in Cedar Rapids, Iowa)
