= Telegraf (Baltimore newspaper) =

Defunct newspaper in Baltimore, Maryland, US

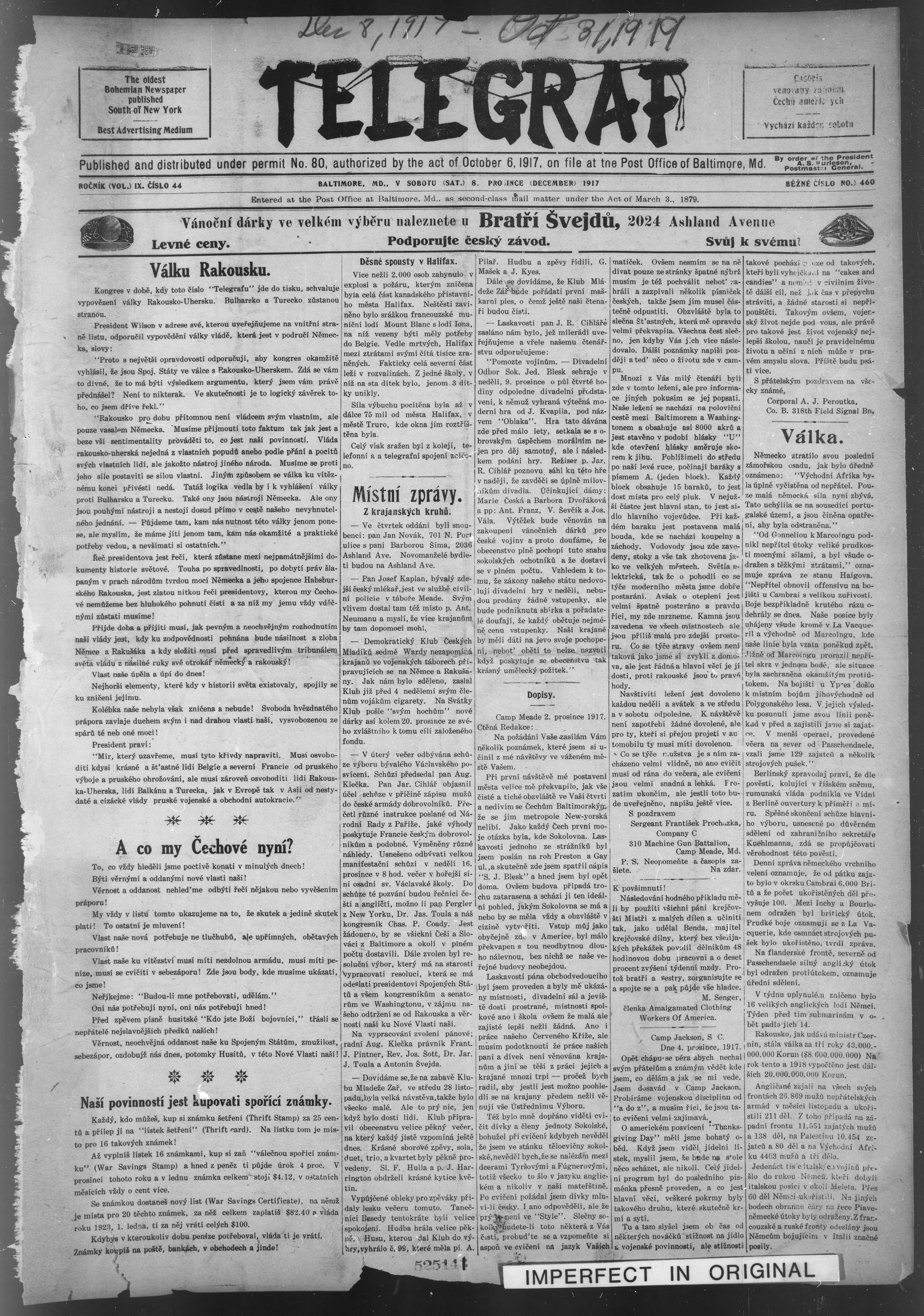
- The cover page for the December 8, 1917 issue of Telegraf
- Type: Weekly newspaper
- Owner(s): Vaclav Joseph Shimek, August Klecka
- Founder: Vaclav Joseph Shimek
- Publisher: Čes.-Am. vydavatelské družstvo
- Editor: Rev. Frank Novak
- Founded: 1909
- Language: Czech
- Headquarters: Baltimore, Maryland, U.S.
- OCLC number: 9483768

The Telegraf was a local weekly newspaper published in Baltimore, Maryland. The newspaper ran for 42 years, from February 20, 1909, until 1951. It was directed at the Czech community in Baltimore and was published in Czech. The newspaper was founded and first published by Vaclav Joseph Shimek, who also founded the Grand Lodge Č.S.P.S. of Baltimore. After 1929, the newspaper was edited by the Rev. Frank Novak and published by August Klecka.

== History ==
In 1909, the Telegraf and its co-owner Venceslaus J. Shimek endorsed the Digges Amendment, a defeated proposal to amend the Maryland Constitution to disenfranchise Black voters. An October 11, 1909, article in the Baltimore Sun stated that foreign-born white voters in Shimek's neighborhood of Baltimore were enthusiastic supporters of the amendment. Although some critics of the amendment were concerned it might be used to restrict the voting rights of foreign-born white people, Shimek wrote in the Telegraf that "...I am in favor of the amendment, heart and soul, and the Telegraf, of which I am president, is supporting it strongly." Shimek argued that Bohemians should support the amendment because only Black Americans would be disenfranchised. The Baltimore Sun summarized Shimek's argument as being that "No Bohemian need fear" because the law "will eliminate only the negro."

== Preservation ==
Baltimore's Enoch Pratt Free Library maintains a partial archive of the Telegraf on microfilm in its Periodicals Department Collection. The Telegraf is also available on microfilm at the Center for Research Libraries, the Maryland State Archives, and the Franklin D. Roosevelt Presidential Library and Museum.

== Gallery ==
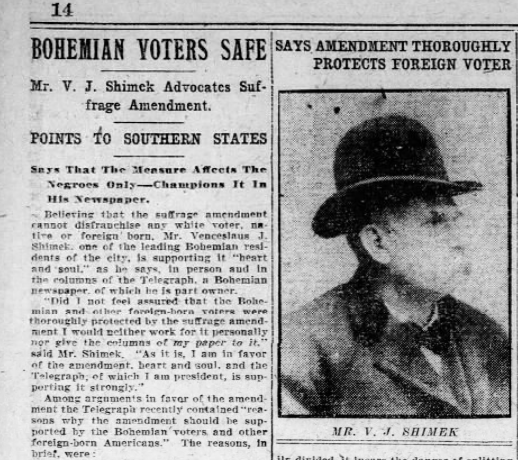
"Bohemian Voters Safe", the Baltimore Sun reports on the Telegraf's endorsement of the Digges Amendment, October 11, 1909.

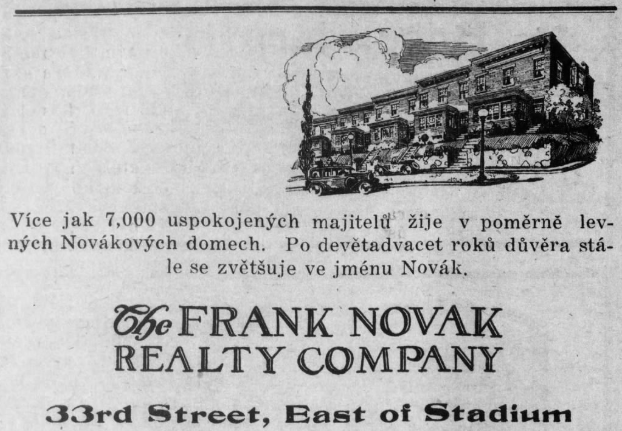
Frank Novak Realty Company advertisement in the Telegraf, December 28, 1928.

== See also ==
- History of the Czechs in Baltimore
