= Maelcum Soul =

Film actress (1940-1968)

- Born: Patricia Ann Soul; September 22, 1940
- Died: April 5, 1968 (aged 27); Baltimore, Maryland, US
- Occupations: Bartender; Artist model; Actress
- Years active: 1966–1968
- Spouse: Dudley Gray

Patricia Ann Soul (September 22, 1940 – April 5, 1968), known professionally as Maelcum Soul, was an American bartender, artist's model, and actress. In the 1960s, she portrayed leading characters in two of filmmaker John Waters' earliest works, Roman Candles and Eat Your Makeup.

== Early life and education ==
Patricia Ann Soul was born September 22, 1940. She studied painting at the Maryland Institute College of Art and worked at the Fat Black Pussycat Cafe on Minetta Lane in New York City.

== Career ==
Soul later worked as a barmaid at Martick's (later Martick's Restaurant Francais), a bistro run by Morris Martick on Mulberry Street in Baltimore. Here, she also worked as an artist's model. Her role in Baltimore was compared with Paris' Kiki de Montparnasse. Starting November 4, 1966, Martick's hosted "The Maelcum Show" with 25 art works of her nude, created by different artists, including her husband Dudley Gray with various styles and mediums. Some pieces were made of stained glass and cardboard cutouts. During her life, most "young-Turk" artists of Baltimore used Soul as a model. Earl Hofmann painted her as a surrealistic giant towering over Baltimore. In response to the exhibit, Soul reported "It’s very funny to see 25 of yous staring at you. It's a happy things, a fun thing, I feel like it’s my birthday."

John Waters called Maelcum Soul “my first star”, adding "she was ahead of her time". She was known for her wild looks, with burnt red hair, white chalk makeup, and very long eyelashes. Waters said she scared everyone, including him, but he loved her. She starred in his first Dreamland-produced movie, Roman Candles, as the Smoking Nun. For Waters' next movie, Eat Your Makeup, she played the role of the Governess. The third movie she was in was Dorothy, the Kansas City Pothead. She was to play the Wicked Witch, but very little was shot and the project was abandoned. Waters said that she was a "big influence" on him, Divine, and his makeup artist, Van Smith.

== Artistry ==
The name Maelcum Soul is said to be of Czech origin. She is described as bohemian "in both the old-baltimore and art-world sense of the word." Soul was reportedly considered the "Alice Prin" of Baltimore. She was known for dyeing her hair an "iron-ore red" and wearing heavy eyeliner and "hip haberdashery" drawing from the style of the Berlin cabarets of Weimar Republic.

== Personal life ==
Soul married Maryland Art Institute student Dudley Gray. She lived in Baltimore and New York City. Soul was described by John Waters as a bohemian. In 1968, she died from a drug overdose. She is buried in Bohemian National Cemetery in Baltimore.

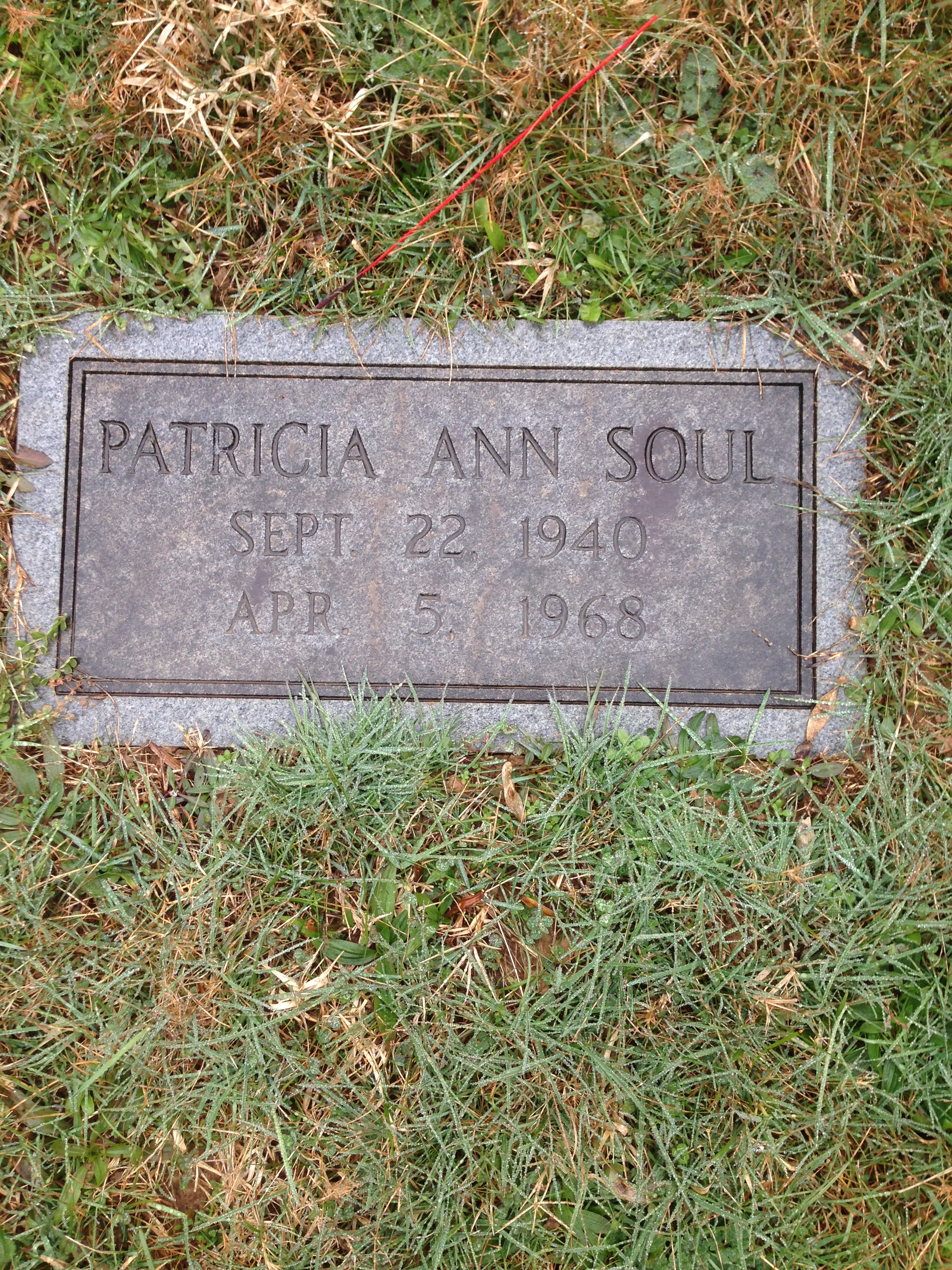
Soul's grave at the Bohemian National Cemetery.

== Legacy ==
Posthumously, The Evening Sun reported that despite a short and "busy" life, Soul achieved "a certain fame." She became "semilegendary among younger admirers of the beat generation. A dozen artists painted her." Soul has been described as a "fabled starlet."

== Filmography ==
- Roman Candles (1966) as Smoking Nun
- Eat Your Makeup (1968) as Governess
- Dorothy, the Kansas City Pothead (1968) as Wicked Witch

== See also ==
- History of the Czechs in Baltimore
