= Melanie Kent Steinhardt =

American painter, printmaker, and ceramicist

- Born: May 26, 1899; Lemberg, Poland
- Died: January 17, 1952 (aged 52); Los Angeles, United States
- Movement: Expressionism

Melanie Kent Steinhardt (May 26, 1899 – January 17, 1952) was a Bohemian American painter, printmaker, and ceramicist.

== Early years ==
Kent Steinhardt was born in the town of Lemberg, Poland (currently Lviv, Ukraine), which was part of the Austro-Hungarian empire. She and her parents, Leopold and Isabella Heller (née Blaustein) were secular Jews. The artist was raised in her father's hometown, Saaz, Bohemia (currently, Zatec, Czech Republic), in the hops-growing region west of Prague. As a teenager, she attended the Kunstgewerbeschule (an arts and crafts school) in Vienna, Austria.

In the summer of 1921, in nearby Marienbad (currently Mariánské Lázně, Czech Republic), the Heller family encountered a Bavarian merchant, Fritz Steinhardt, who profoundly altered the lives of the Heller family.

== First marriage ==
Fritz Steinhardt ultimately became Mela's husband, and moved Mela, then 23, to Berlin, Germany, where for a privileged decade, she honed her painting techniques with distinguished professors, such as Willi Jaekel, at the Verein der Berliner Künstlerinnen (Union of Berlin Women Artists' School).

One month prior to the birth of her first child, Melanie's mother and sister were asphyxiated due to a faulty gas line in their apartment Fritz Steinhardt's hometown, Fürth, Bavaria.

Fritz and Melanie Steinhardt raised two children, Edith (born 1923) and Gerhart (born 1925).

Ultimately, the Steinhardts' marriage failed, and the artist was banished from the family's Dahlem, Berlin home. During the period of ten years, from 1923 to 1933, the painter signed her works Mela Steinhardt.

== Second marriage ==
In 1933, Melanie Steinhardt married Alfred Kent, a Viennese attorney. They lived for several years at Villa Freiberg in Zell am See, Austria, in the house presented to Melanie by Fritz Steinhardt on their honeymoon in 1923.

== Emigration ==
Shadowing her children across Europe, and ultimately to the United States, Melanie and Alfred Kent made their way from New York City to Hollywood in 1943. By the end of World War II, the artist returned to painting and etching. The couple moved to Inglewood, California in 1946.

== Ceramics ==
Mela manufactured handmade ceramic tableware under the brand Kent Handmade, which she initially glazed and fired in the Kent's garage in Inglewood. From 1948 until her death, Kent Steinhardt owned and operated the Home Decorators Hobby Shop on Robertson Boulevard in Los Angeles. She produced and taught ceramics, painting, sewing, and crafts.

== Expressionist art ==
"Kent Steinhardt’s compositions, portraits and landscapes blend European Expressionism with an émigré’s troubled impressions" of her new American life.

Much of the work Kent Steinhardt created in her final years depict complex existential themes, reminiscent of the work of post-World War 1 Expressionists Käthe Kollwitz, James Ensor, Max Beckmann, and George Grosz.

Mela's ten commandments, written by Melanie Kent Steinhardt, translated from German (c.1930s):

Thou shalt help others.
Thou shalt love.
Thou shalt have ideals.
Thou shalt fight for those ideals.
Thou shalt be factual.
Thou shalt not humiliate.
Thou shalt give of one's self generously.
Thou shalt be thankful.
Thou shalt not kill with words or weapons.
Thou shalt not poison with words or chemicals.

== Death ==
Melanie Kent Steinhardt died due to carbon monoxide poisoning in her Robertson Boulevard shop in January 1952. She was 52 years old. Her grandson Richard and his wife published “Mela: The Life and Art of Melanie Kent Steinhardt,” a limited edition art biography in 2002 to pay tribute to the grandmother he never knew.

== Exhibition ==
- A retrospective of the artist's work was presented at California State University Sonoma in 2006.
- The premiere exhibition of the artworks of Melanie Kent Steinhardt (1899-1952) was held from 30 January to 24 March 2006 at The University Library Art Gallery at Sonoma State University.

== List of selected works ==
- Everything Money Can Buy, oil on canvas, 16" x 20" (1950). Gallery: Tradition of Mayhem, Mela Kent Steinhardt
- Lady Liberty, oil on canvas, 23.5" x 19.5" (1949). Gallery: Tradition of Mayhem, Mela Kent Steinhardt
- Worship of the golden calf, oil on canvas, 20" x 16 (1951). Gallery: Tradition of Mayhem, Mela Kent Steinhardt
- Torment of the Agnostic, oil on canvas, 20" x 23" (1951). Gallery: Tradition of Mayhem, Mela Kent Steinhardt
