= Roman Candles (1966 film) =

1966 film by John Waters

- Original film poster
- Directed by: John Waters
- Written by: John Waters
- Produced by: John Waters
- Starring: Divine; Maelcum Soul; David Lochary
- Cinematography: John Waters
- Edited by: John Waters
- Music by: John Waters
- Distributed by: Dreamland
- Release date: 1966
- Running time: 40 min.
- Country: United States
- Language: English

Roman Candles is a 1966 short film directed by John Waters and starring Divine, Mary Vivian Pearce, David Lochary, Mink Stole, and Maelcum Soul.

The film was shown "triple projected" on three 8mm projectors running simultaneously but was never released commercially. However, since 2004, it has been screened occasionally as part of various John Waters touring art exhibitions. But as of current, no bootlegs or recordings of the film have surfaced.

== Plot ==
The movie features random scenes of Maelcum Soul in nun habit drag, a priest drinking a beer, a woman being attacked with an electric fan, a drag queen riding a motorcycle, and Divine playing hide and seek. The soundtrack is played back from tape in the room during the screening, and includes radio advertisements, rock songs, a press conference with Lee Harvey Oswald's mother, and a tune by the Shangri-Las.

== Cast ==
- Divine
- Maelcum Soul
- David Lochary
- Mona Montgomery
- Mary Vivian Pearce
- Pat Moran
- Mink Stole
- Bob Skidmore
- John Waters

== See also ==
- List of American films of 1966
