= Kvášňovice =

- Municipality
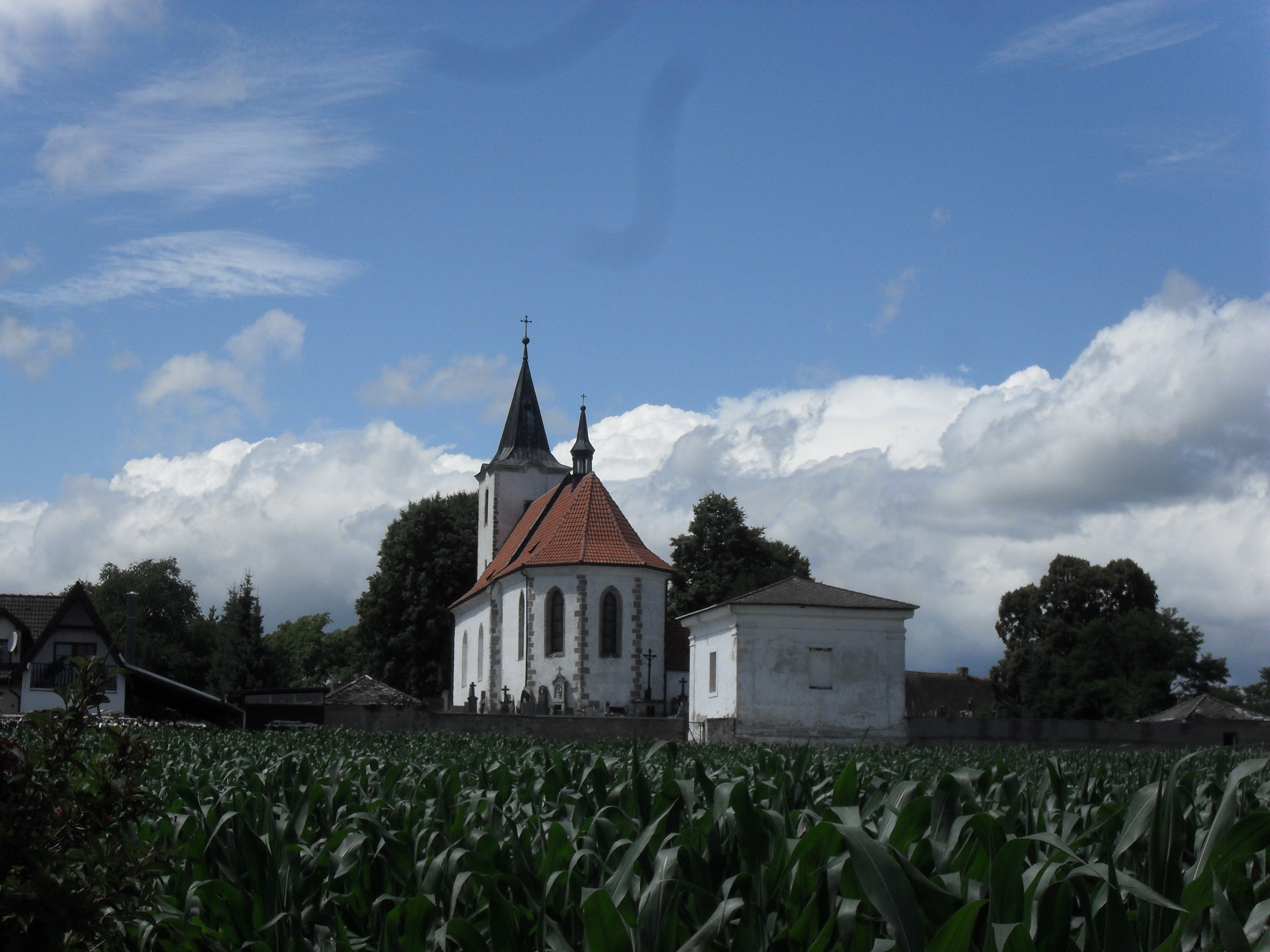
- Church of Saint Bartholomew

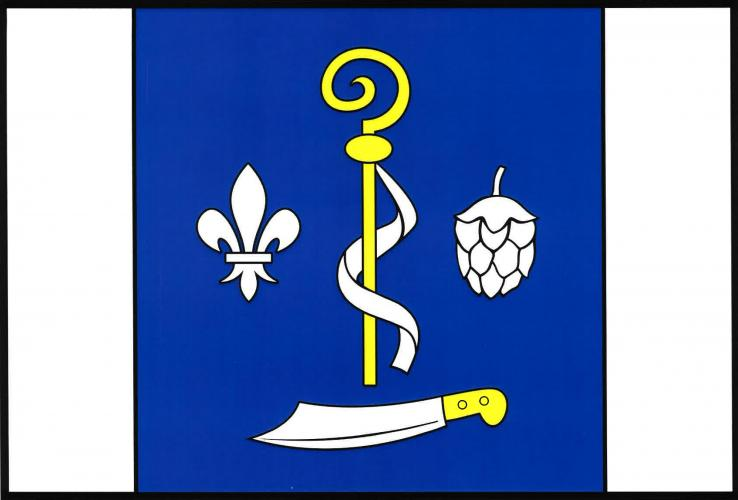
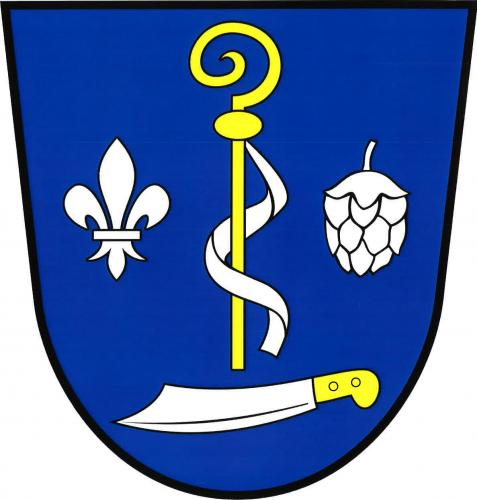
- Flag Coat of arms

- Location in the Czech Republic
- Coordinates: 49°24′47″N 13°38′31″E
- Country: Czech Republic
- Region: Plzeň
- District: Klatovy
- First mentioned: 1364

Area
  - Total: 4.42 km^{2} (1.71 sq mi)
- Elevation: 536 m (1,759 ft)

Population (2026-01-01)
  - Total: 125
  - Density: 28.3/km^{2} (73.2/sq mi)
- Time zone: UTC+1 (CET)
  - Summer (DST): UTC+2 (CEST)
- Postal code: 341 01
- Website: www.kvasnovice.cz

Kvášňovice is a municipality and village in Klatovy District in the Plzeň Region of the Czech Republic. It has about 100 inhabitants.

Kvášňovice lies approximately 26 kilometres (16 mi) east of Klatovy, 43 km (27 mi) south-east of Plzeň, and 94 km (58 mi) south-west of Prague.

== Demographics ==
Historical population
Year	Pop.	±%
1869	353	—
1880	362	+2.5%
1890	397	+9.7%
1900	410	+3.3%
1910	404	−1.5%
1921	363	−10.1%
1930	381	+5.0%
1950	275	−27.8%
1961	251	−8.7%
1970	226	−10.0%
1980	172	−23.9%
1991	136	−20.9%
2001	127	−6.6%
2011	125	−1.6%
2021	129	+3.2%
Source: Censuses
