= Nehodiv =

- Municipality
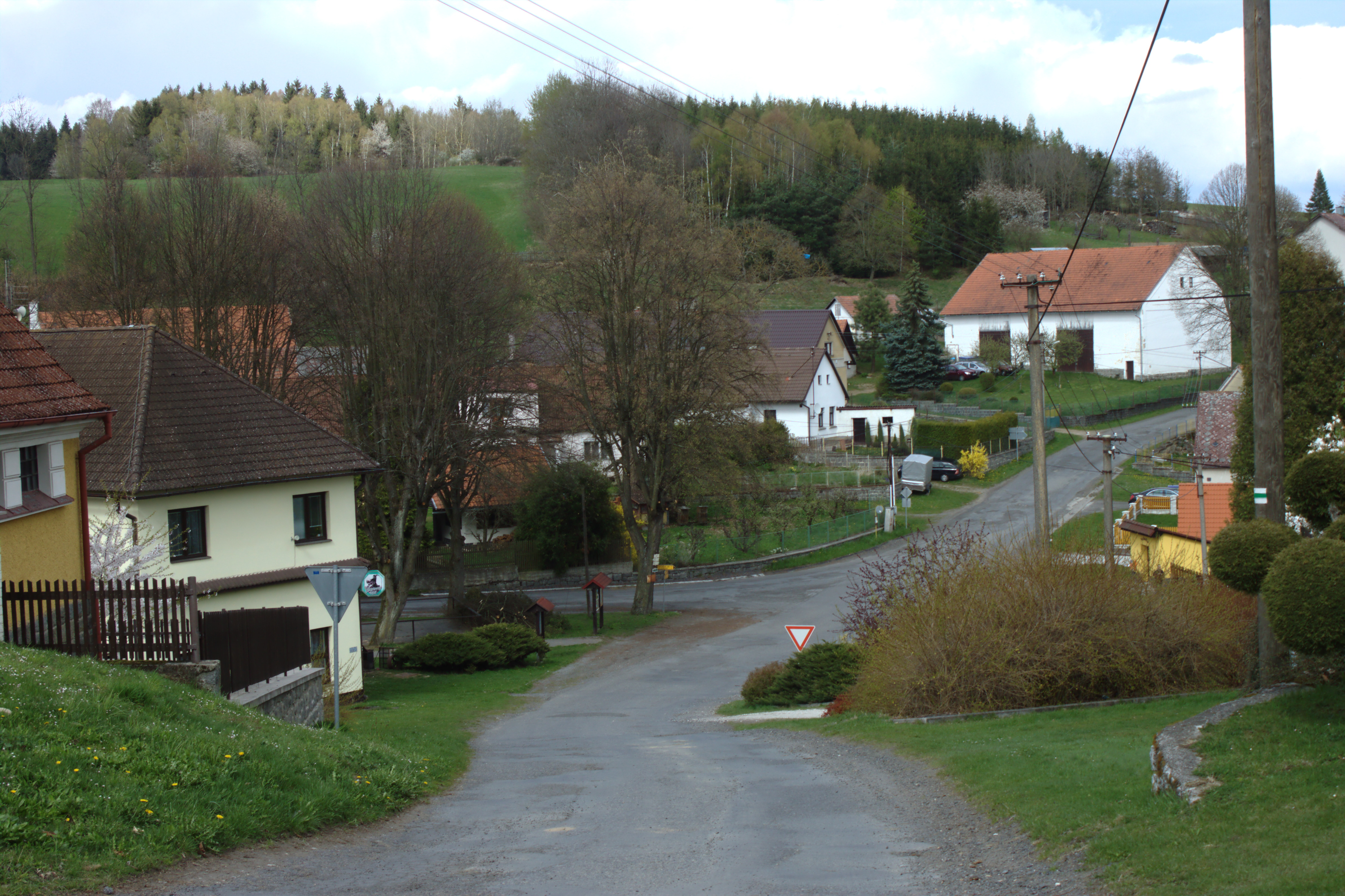
- Centre of Nehodiv

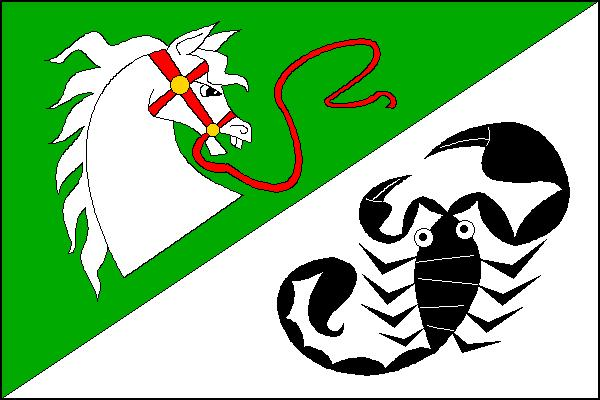
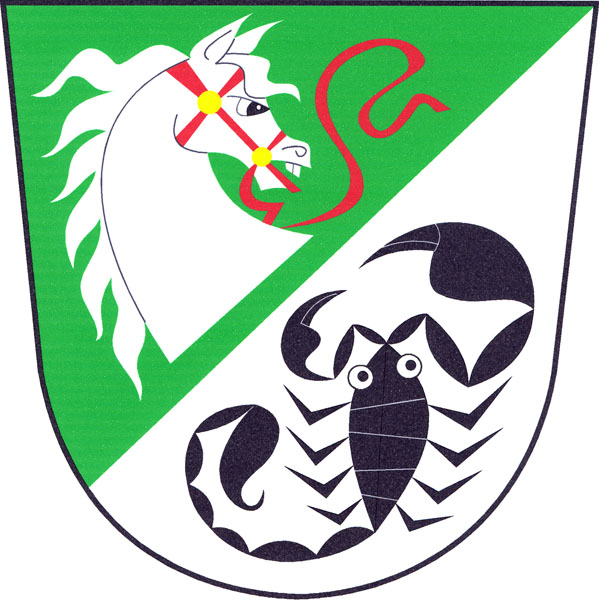
- Flag Coat of arms

- Location in the Czech Republic
- Coordinates: 49°24′39″N 13°33′23″E
- Country: Czech Republic
- Region: Plzeň
- District: Klatovy
- First mentioned: 1558

Area
  - Total: 3.95 km^{2} (1.53 sq mi)
- Elevation: 607 m (1,991 ft)

Population (2026-01-01)
  - Total: 88
  - Density: 22/km^{2} (58/sq mi)
- Time zone: UTC+1 (CET)
  - Summer (DST): UTC+2 (CEST)
- Postal code: 341 01
- Website: www.nehodiv.cz

Nehodiv is a municipality and village in Klatovy District in the Plzeň Region of the Czech Republic. It has about 90 inhabitants.

== Etymology ==
The name is derived from the personal name Nehoděj.

== Geography ==
Nehodiv is located about 19 km (12 mi) east of Klatovy and 37 km (23 mi) south of Plzeň. It lies in the Blatná Uplands. The highest point is the hill Stírka at 706 m (2,316 ft) above sea level. In the western part of the territory is located the Dolejší dráhy Nature Monument.

== History ==
The first written mention of Nehodiv is from 1558.

== Demographics ==
Historical population

Year	Pop.	±%
1869	277	—
1880	340	+22.7%
1890	293	−13.8%
1900	306	+4.4%
1910	291	−4.9%

Year	Pop.	±%
1921	262	−10.0%
1930	240	−8.4%
1950	173	−27.9%
1961	168	−2.9%
1970	126	−25.0%

Year	Pop.	±%
1980	94	−25.4%
1991	77	−18.1%
2001	74	−3.9%
2011	67	−9.5%
2021	65	−3.0%

Source: Censuses

== Economy ==
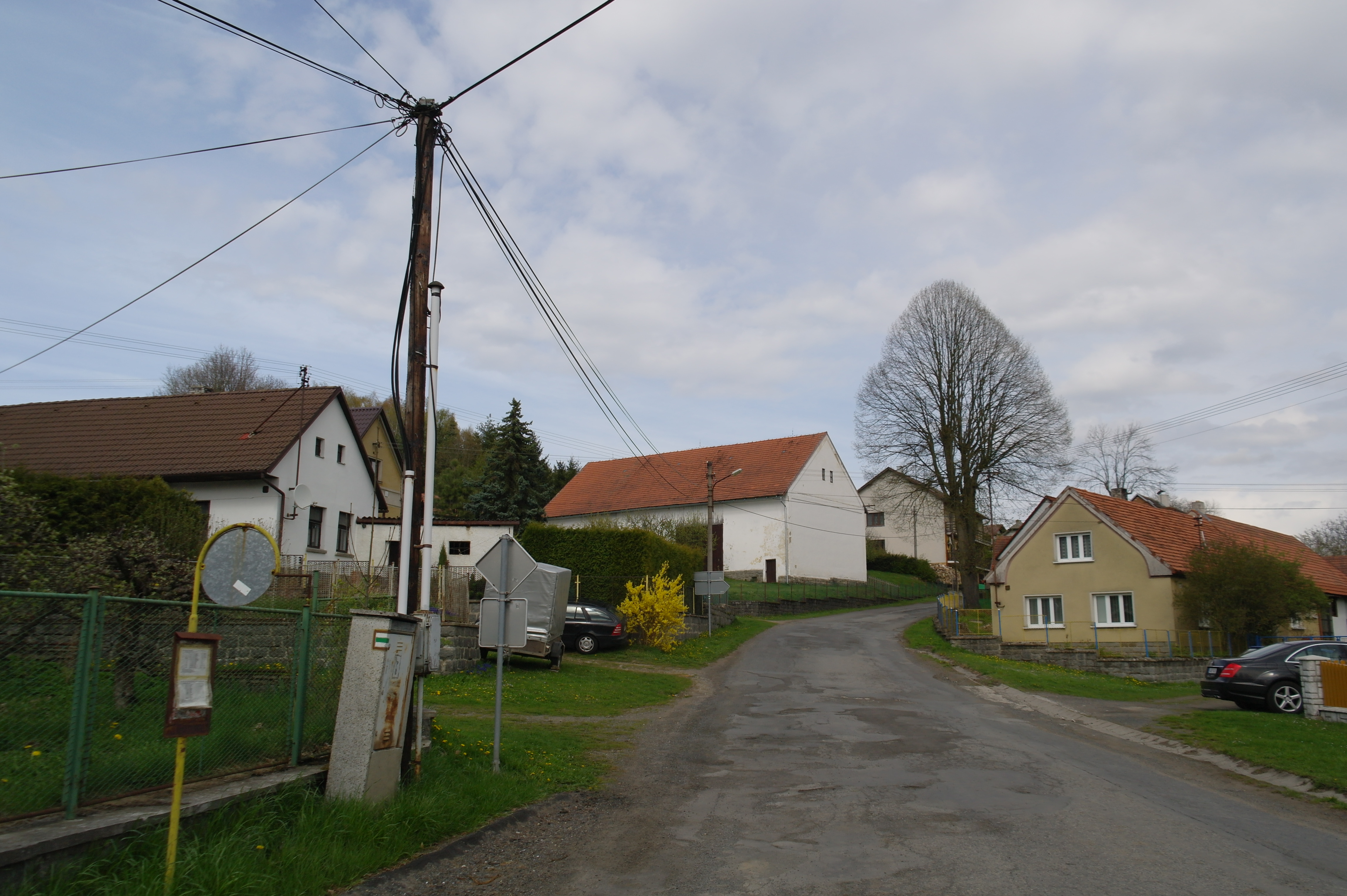
Main street

Nehodiv is known for a marble quarry. In 2015, the extraction was renewed.

== Transport ==
There are no railways or major roads passing through the municipality.

== Sights ==
There are no protected cultural monuments in the municipality. A landmark of the centre of Nehodiv is the Chapel of Saint John of Nepomuk, built in 1950.
