= B movies since the 1980s =

Cinematic exhibition of the B movie, defined as a relatively low-cost genre film, has declined substantially from the early 1980s to the present. Spurred by the historic success of several big-budget movies with B-style themes beginning in the mid-1970s, the major Hollywood studios moved progressively into the production of A-grade films in genres that had long been low-budget territory. With the majors also adopting exploitation-derived methods of booking and marketing, B movies began to be squeezed out of the commercial arena. The advent of digital cinema in the new millennium appeared to open up new opportunities for the distribution of inexpensive genre movies.

== The B movie loses its place: 1980s ==
Most of the B movie production houses founded during the exploitation era collapsed or were subsumed by larger companies as the field's financial situation changed in the early 1980s. Even a comparatively cheap, efficiently made genre picture intended for theatrical release began to cost millions of dollars, as the major movie studios steadily moved into the production of expensive genre movies, raising audience expectations for spectacular action sequences and realistic special effects. Intimations of the trend were evident as early as Airport (1970) and especially in the mega-schlock of The Poseidon Adventure (1972), Earthquake (1973), and The Towering Inferno (1974). Their disaster plots and dialogue were B-grade at best; from an industry perspective, however, these were pictures firmly rooted in the tradition of star-stuffed extravaganzas like The Ten Commandments (1956) and Around the World in Eighty Days (1956). The Exorcist (1973) and, though not effects-driven, George Lucas's American Graffiti (1973) were the first serious steps in Hollywood's transformation into an industry built around high-budget B-themed movies.

But the tidal shift in the majors' focus owed largely to the enormous success of three films: Steven Spielberg's creature feature Jaws (1975) and Lucas's space opera Star Wars (1977) had each, in turn, become the highest-grossing film in motion picture history. Superman, released in December 1978, had proved that a studio could spend $55 million on a movie about a children's comic book character and make a very handsome profit. Not an all-time record-breaker like Jaws and Star Wars, it was merely the biggest box-office hit of 1979. Blockbuster fantasy spectacles like the original, 1933 King Kong had once been exceptional; in the new Hollywood, increasingly under the sway of multi-industrial conglomerates, they would rule.

It had taken a decade and half, from 1961 to 1976, for the production cost of the average Hollywood feature to double from $2 million to $4 million—actually a decline if adjusted for inflation. In just four years it more than doubled again, hitting $8.5 million in 1980 (a constant-dollar increase of about 25 percent). Even as the U.S. inflation rate eased, the average expense of moviemaking would continue to soar. With the majors now routinely saturation booking in over a thousand theaters, it was becoming increasingly difficult for smaller outfits to secure the exhibition commitments needed to turn a profit. Revival houses were now the almost-exclusive preserve of the double feature. One of the first leading casualties of the new economic regime was venerable B studio Allied Artists, which declared bankruptcy in April 1979. In the late 1970s, American International Pictures (AIP) had moved into the production of relatively expensive comedies and genre films like the very successful Amityville Horror and the disastrous, $20 million Meteor in 1979. That same year, the studio was sold off to Filmways, a company with a history in TV production, and was dissolved as a moviemaking concern by the end of 1980. Capitalizing on the popularity of Hercules, in 1960 Roger Corman had made Atlas for a total of $75,000. In 1982, Universal released a movie in the same tradition: fantasy plus muscles. The lead role was to be played by an Austrian-born actor with a great reputation as a bodybuilder but entirely unproven as a major film star. Adjusting for inflation, the cost of Atlas was about $400,000 in 1982 dollars. Production cost on Conan the Barbarian was an estimated $20 million. Hercules had opened in 600 theaters, an astonishing figure at the time. Conan opened in 1,395, making it one of more than twenty movies that year to open at over 900 theaters.

Despite the mounting financial pressures, distribution obstacles, and overall risk, a substantial number of genre movies from small studios and independent filmmakers were still reaching theaters. In September 1980, Corman released his most expensive movie to date: Battle Beyond the Stars, with screenplay by John Sayles and art direction by James Cameron, cost his New World Pictures a grand total of $2 million. By comparison, the Star Wars sequel The Empire Strikes Back, which came out three-and-a-half months before the Corman epic, was originally budgeted at $18.5 million and wound up costing $33 million, triple the cost of Star Wars just three years before. Horror was the strongest low-budget genre of the time, particularly in the "slasher" mode as with The Slumber Party Massacre (1982), directed by Amy Holden-Jones and written by feminist author Rita Mae Brown. The film was produced for New World on a budget of $250,000. At the beginning of 1983, Corman sold New World; New Horizons, later Concorde–New Horizons, became his primary company. In 1984, New Horizons released a critically applauded movie set amid the punk scene written and directed by Penelope Spheeris. Vincent Canby's admiring review ends with a definitive compliment: "Suburbia is a good genre film."

Writer-director Larry Cohen continued to twist genre conventions in pictures such as Q (aka Q: The Winged Serpent; 1982): "the kind of movie that used to be indispensable to the market: an imaginative, popular, low-budget picture that makes the most of its limited resources, and in which people get on with the job instead of standing around talking about it." In 1981, New Line Cinema put out Polyester, a John Waters movie with an estimated $300,000 budget and an old-school exploitation gimmick: Odorama. In October that year, a gore-filled yet stylish horror movie made for less than $400,000 was premiered at a theater in Detroit. The writer, director, and co–executive producer of The Book of the Dead, Sam Raimi, was a week shy of his twenty-second birthday; star and co–executive producer Bruce Campbell was twenty-three. Retitled The Evil Dead, it was picked up for distribution by New Line in 1983 and became a critical and commercial hit. Comparing it to Night of the Living Dead, one reviewer said "it achieves a similarly claustrophobic intensity on a microscopic budget. It's a shoestring tour de force."

One of the most successful B-movie companies of the 1980s was a survivor from the heyday of the exploitation era, Troma Pictures, founded in 1974. Troma's most characteristic productions, including Class of Nuke 'Em High (1986), Redneck Zombies (1986), and Surf Nazis Must Die (1987), take exploitation for an absurdist spin. Troma also built on another B-studio tradition: re-releasing the often embarrassing early films of actors turning into major stars. In 1986, the company acquired and distributed two unreleased films, Sizzle Beach U.S.A. (shot in 1974) and Shadows Run Black (shot in 1981), capitalizing on performances by Kevin Costner, who had recently appeared in the popular Silverado (1985) and was set to headline The Untouchables (1987). Troma's best-known production is The Toxic Avenger (1985), whose hero, after plunging into a vat of toxic waste while attempting to escape a loathsome gang of tormentors, mutates into a hideous creature with enhanced physical strength and revenge on what's left of his mind. After the film's successful release, the character, affectionately known as Toxie, became the symbol of Troma and an icon of the 1980s B movie. One of the few successful B-studio startups of the decade was Rome-based Empire Pictures, whose first production, Ghoulies, reached theaters in 1985. Despite other profitable ventures such as Re-Animator (1985), financial difficulties forced the company's American founder to sell it off in 1988.

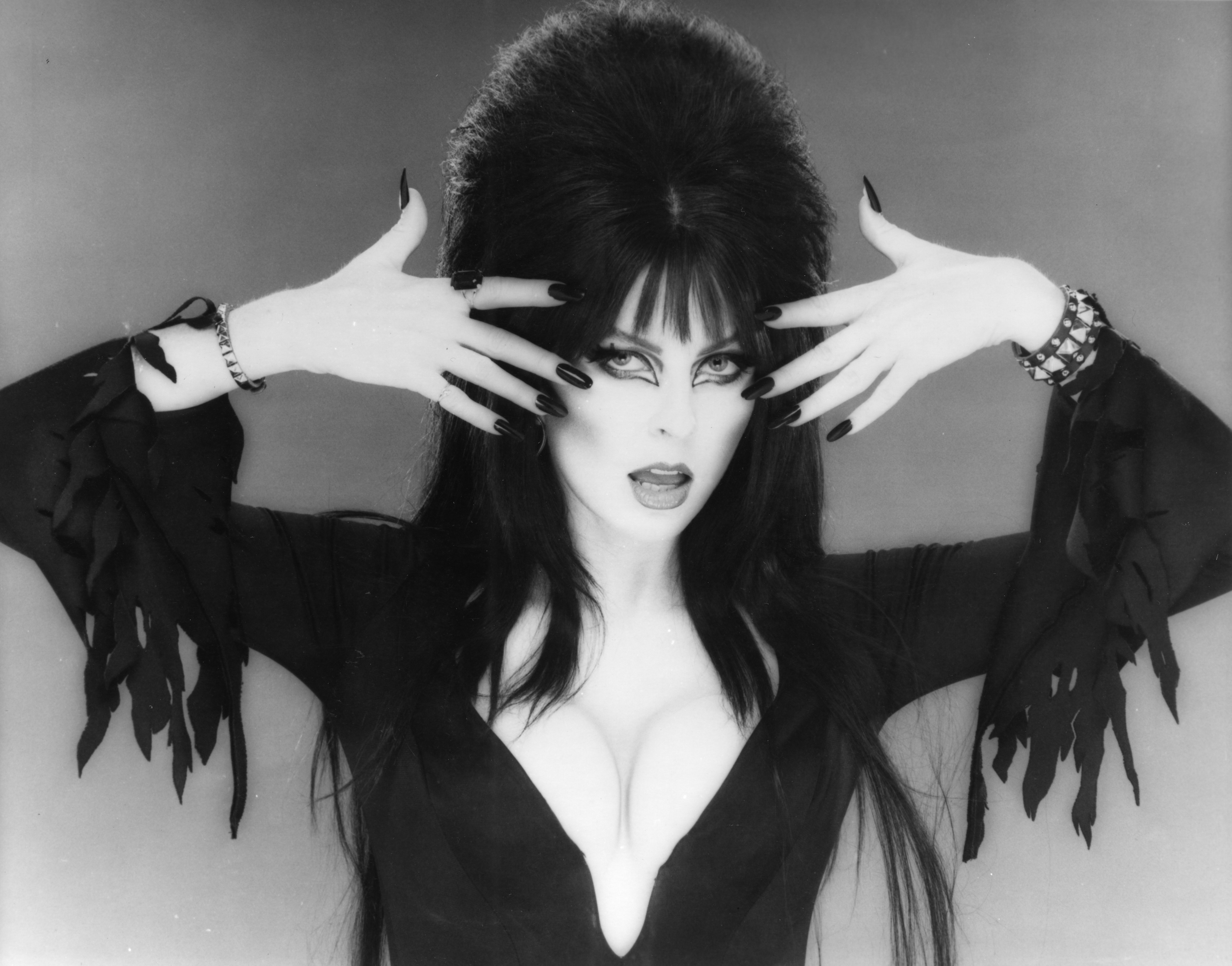
Elvira, Mistress of the Dark adapted the midnight movie tradition for cable television.

The growth of the cable television industry in the 1980s helped support the low-budget film market, as many B movies quickly wound up as "filler" material for 24-hour cable channels or were made expressly for that purpose. The broadcast version of the midnight movie remained popular: the nationally syndicated Movie Macabre package starring Cassandra Peterson—aka Elvira, Mistress of the Dark—was essentially a brassier copy of The Vampira Show, presenting mostly low-budget horror films interspersed with Elvira's satiric commentary and abundant display of cleavage. The video rental market was also becoming central to B-film economics: Empire's financial model, for instance, relied on seeing a profit not from theatrical rentals, but only later, at the video store. A number of Concorde–New Horizon releases appeared only briefly in theaters, or not at all.

== B movies in the arthouse: 1990s ==
By 1990, the cost of the average U.S. film had passed $25 million. Of the nine films released that year to gross more than $100 million at the U.S. box office, two would have been strictly B-movie material before the late 1970s: Teenage Mutant Ninja Turtles and Dick Tracy. Three more—the science-fiction thriller Total Recall, the action-filled detective thriller Die Hard 2, and the year's biggest hit, the slapstick kiddie comedy Home Alone—were also far closer to the traditional arena of the B's than to classic A-list subject matter. The growing popularity of home video and access to unedited movies on cable and satellite television along with real estate pressures were making survival more difficult for the sort of small- or non-chain theaters that were the primary home of independently produced genre films. Drive-in screens were rapidly disappearing from the American landscape: between 1987 and 1990, the number in operation fell from 2,507 to 910. Surviving B-movie operations adapted in different ways. Releases from Troma now frequently went straight to video. As if in farewell, the company brought a title to the big screen in 1991 that summed up much of the preceding three-and-a-half decades of B movies: Chopper Chicks in Zombietown. Empire's founder, Charles Band, started a new production company, Full Moon, specifically to address the direct-to-video market. New Line, in its first decade, had been almost exclusively a distributor of low-budget independent and foreign genre pictures. With the smash success of exploitation veteran Wes Craven's original Nightmare on Elm Street (1984), whose nearly $2 million cost it had directly backed, the company began moving steadily into higher-budget genre productions. In 1994, New Line was sold to the Turner Broadcasting System; it was soon being run as a midsized studio with a broad range of product alongside Warner Bros. within the Time Warner conglomerate. The following year, Showtime launched Roger Corman Presents, a series of thirteen straight-to-cable movies produced by Concorde–New Horizons. A New York Times reviewer found that the initial installment qualified as "vintage Corman...spiked with everything from bared female breasts to a mind-blowing quote from Thomas Mann's Death in Venice."

At the same time as exhibition venues for B films vanished, the independent film movement was burgeoning; among the results were various crossovers between the low-budget genre movie and the "sophisticated" arthouse picture. Director Abel Ferrara, who built a reputation with violent B movies such as The Driller Killer (1979) and Ms. 45 (1981), made two works in the early nineties that marry exploitation-worthy depictions of sex, drugs, and general sleaze to complex examinations of honor and redemption: King of New York (1990) was backed by a group of mostly small production companies and the cost of Bad Lieutenant (1992), $1.8 million, was financed totally independently. Ferrara followed these two movies with Body Snatchers (1993), a major-studio remake of the sci-fi classic and an acknowledgment of his debt to the B's of an earlier generation. Larry Fessenden's micro-budget monster movies, such as No Telling (1991) and Habit (1997), reframe classic genre subjects—Frankenstein and vampirism, respectively—to explore issues of contemporary relevance—animal experimentation, ecological destruction, drug addiction, and fin-de-siècle urban romance. Written and directed by Jeremy Horton, 100 Proof (1997) is based on the true story of a killing spree that occurred in Lexington, Kentucky, a decade earlier. Praising its authentic depiction of the impoverished milieu in which it is set, critics variously described its style as evoking a home movie or a reality-style TV police series. Joe Leydon of Variety, capturing the way it crossed the line between genre and art film, called it a "diamond in the rough, or at least a shiny bit of jagged rhinestone."

David Cronenberg, one of the leading B-movie auteurs of the 1970s, had stepped up in financial grade with Scanners (1980), a $3.5 million production that Time critic Richard Corliss associated with his earlier, low-budget films as well as George A. Romero's Dawn of the Dead (1978) and John Carpenter's The Fog (1980) as "hip parables of contemporary moral malaise." Cronenberg's crowning achievement in that vein would come a decade and a half later: Like that of Scanners in 1980, the budget of Crash, $10 million, wasn't comfortably A-grade by 1996, but it was hardly B-level either. The film's imagery was another matter: "On its scandalizing surface, David Cronenberg's Crash suggests exploitation at its most disturbingly sick," is how Janet Maslin's New York Times review begins. The review ends with an explanation of the film's rating: "Crash has the NC-17 rating (No one under 17 admitted) that it fully deserves. It includes frontal nudity, many sexual encounters and coolly grotesque situations linking sex and violence in graphic, sickening ways." Financed, like King of New York, by a consortium of production companies, it was ultimately picked up for U.S. distribution by Fine Line Features. In more ways than one, this result resonated perfectly with the way the film scrambled definitions: Fine Line was a subsidiary of New Line, recently merged into the Time Warner empire—specifically, it was the old exploitation distributor's arthouse division.

== The B movie in the digital age: 2000s ==
By the turn of the millennium, the average production cost of an American feature had already spent three years above the $50 million mark. In 2005, the top ten movies at the U.S. box office included three adaptations of children's fantasy novels (including one extending and another initiating a series, as well as a remake of a 1971 film), a child-targeted cartoon, a comic book adaptation, a sci-fi series installment, a sci-fi remake, and a King Kong remake. It was a slow year for Corman: he produced just one movie, which had no American theatrical release, true of most of the pictures he had been involved in recently. Bloodfist 2050, directed by long-time B filmmaker and Corman collaborator Cirio H. Santiago, went straight to DVD in the United States. Ultrawide openings at many thousands of theaters were becoming the norm. In May 2007 alone, three fantasy blockbusters—Pirates of the Caribbean: At World's End, Spider-Man 3, and Shrek the Third—each opened on over 10,000 screens. As big-budget Hollywood movies further usurped the genre territories that were traditionally the domain of the B's, the ongoing viability of the familiar brand of B movie was in grave doubt. Critic A. O. Scott of the New York Times warned of the impending "extinction" of:

"the cheesy, campy, guilty pleasures that used to bubble up with some regularity out of the B-picture ooze of cut-rate genre entertainment. Those cherished bad movies—full of jerry-built effects, abominable acting, ludicrous story lines—once flickered with zesty crudity in drive-ins and grind houses across the land. B-picture genres—science fiction and comic-book fantasy in particular, but also kiddie cartoons and horror pictures—now dominate the A-list, commanding the largest budgets and the most attention from the market-research and quality-control departments of the companies that manufacture them.... [F]or the most part, the schlock of the past has evolved into star-driven, heavily publicized, expensive mediocrities...."

On the other hand, recent industry trends suggest the reemergence of something that looks very like the traditional A-B split in major studio production, though with fewer "programmers" bridging the gap. According to a 2006 report by industry analyst Alfonso Marone, "The average budget for a Hollywood movie is currently around $60m, rising to $100m when the cost of marketing for domestic launch (USA only) is factored into the equation. However, we are now witnessing a polarisation of film budgets into two tiers: large productions ($120–150m) and niche features ($5–20m). The rationale is that the likelihood of success is maximised by coupling ultra-large budget and highly marketable features (e.g., Pirates of the Caribbean: Dead Man's Chest), with multiple low-cost bets (e.g., Little Miss Sunshine). Fewer $30–70m releases are expected."

Little Miss Sunshine was produced by Fox Searchlight, the major studio's pseudo-indie subsidiary, for $8 million. With its quirky, "indie"-style comedy, the film hardly meets any conventional definition of a B movie beyond its relatively small budget, but the sorts of movies embraced by the term have shifted drastically before. Classic film noir's combination of visual beauty and verbal wit, for instance, was hardly common coin in exploitation-era B filmmaking. Further expanding the field, Fox launched a new subsidiary in 2006, Fox Atomic, to concentrate on teen-oriented genre films (horror in particular, at first, then increasingly comedy, as well). The genre focus was similar to that of Sony's Screen Gems division and the Weinsteins' Dimension Films, but the economic model was deliberately low-rent, at least by major studio standards. According to a Variety report, "Fox Atomic is staying at or below the $10 million mark for many of its movies. It's also encouraging filmmakers to shoot digitally—a cheaper process that results in a grittier, teen-friendly look. And forget about stars. Of Atomic's nine announced films, not one has a big-name." In sum, this was an updated version of a Golden Age big studio B unit targeting a market very similar to the one Samuel Z. Arkoff and James H. Nicholson's AIP helped define in the 1950s. Despite its low budgets and consequently low benchmarks for profitability, Fox Atomic's output was seen as unsuccessful by its parent company, which shut it down in 2009.

In a development hinted at by the Variety quotation above, technological advances are greatly facilitating the production of truly low-budget motion pictures. Although there have always been economical means with which to shoot movies, including Super 8 and 16 mm film, as well as video cameras recording onto analog videotape, these mediums could hardly rival the image quality of 35 mm film. The development and widespread usage of digital cameras and postproduction methods allow even low-budget filmmakers to produce films with excellent (and not necessarily "grittier") image quality and precise editing effects—though technical excellence is no guarantee of aesthetic value or even cinematographic competence. As Marone observes, "the equipment budget (camera, support) required for shooting digital is approximately 1/10 that for film, significantly lowering the production budget for independent features." Comparing circumstances in 2006 to those just a couple of years earlier, he argues that the "quality of digital filmmaking has improved dramatically."

Independent filmmakers, whether working in a genre or arthouse mode, continue to find it difficult to gain access to distribution channels, though so-called digital end-to-end methods of distribution offer new opportunities. The so-called day-and-date strategy, in a which a film is released simultaneously in theaters as well as DVD and/or cable, may offer a way for the true low-budget B movie to regain some of the audience it has lost. In a similar fashion, the popularity of Internet sites such as YouTube have opened up entirely new avenues for the presentation of motion pictures made on a shoestring. Abel Ferrara, envisioning his first digital film, says, "I want to do it on the Internet...and put it out in 10-minute increments. I know that watching films on computer is the future—it's a direct connection to the audience."

Many of these developments have come together to create a boom in a relatively new form of low-budget genre picture. The fan film, typically an unauthorized production set in the imaginary universe of a popular genre movie or TV series, may be thought of as the most widespread present incarnation of the B movie. "Arguably the first fan film was Hardware Wars, a short spoof from 1977 depicting toasters and egg-beaters fighting in space," according to journalist Curt Holman. "In the first decade of the new millenni[um], fan films have grown exponentially in quantity and improved significantly in quality and ambition...[t]hanks to digital cameras, affordable editing software and online distribution." In 2002, Lucasfilm created a yearly award ceremony for noncommercial fan films, arranging to screen them online via AtomFilms (purchased in 2006 by MTV Networks). Star Wars: Revelations (2005), a 40-minute drama directed by Shane Felux for a production cost of $20,000, has apparently been downloaded by millions. Similar projects are designed as "episodes" set in the TV-based Star Trek and Buffy the Vampire Slayer universes. A parallel development in fan culture has been inspired in part by the direct-to-video market, whose products garner little notice and less respect in mainstream culture. According to scholar Linda Ruth Williams, the "new B-movie culture runs on the convoluted equation that cheap means bad which means good. Such products garner far more respect from fans because they manage to press the same buttons on one million dollars (or less) rather than one hundred million (or more)."

Since 2006, The Asylum—a production company founded in 1997—has specialized in low-budget pictures also inspired by the big-budget films that have largely usurped the B movie's place in the theatrical market. The company makes what one critic dubbed "mockbusters", straight-to-video knockoffs of major studio action pictures: Transformers, for instance, is transformed into The Asylum's Transmorphers. Another commercial relative of the fan film is the overt B-movie homage. Quentin Tarantino and Robert Rodriguez's Grindhouse (2007) nods to a wide variety of exploitation styles popular from the late 1960s through the early 1980s. Criticizing the film, notwithstanding its "posture of cool," as yet another "blockbuster B-movie," Adario Strange places it in historical context: "Despite themselves, Tarantino and Rodriguez have the right idea. As the tools for filmmaking have become cheaper and more malleable, now is the time for rough, ugly, experimental films to shine again as they did in the '70s. The problem for these directors is that they are just too rich, too well-connected and too self-aware to produce films that are truly spit and chewing gum, bleeding-edge like Eric Nicholas' Alone with Her, Vincent Gallo's The Brown Bunny or Shane Carruth's Primer—films most Americans will never see."

== Sources ==
- Canby, Vincent (1984). "Down-and-Out Youths in 'Suburbia,'" New York Times, April 13 (available online).
- Collum, Jason Paul (2004). Assault of the Killer B's: Interviews with 20 Cult Film Actresses (Jefferson, N.C., and London: McFarland). ISBN 0-7864-1818-4
- Cook, David A. (2000). Lost Illusions: American Cinema in the Shadow of Watergate and Vietnam, 1970–1979. Berkeley, Los Angeles, and London: University of California Press. ISBN 0-520-23265-8
- Corliss, Richard (1981). "This Is the Way the World Ends," Time, January 26 (available online).
- Corman, Roger, with Jim Jerome (1998). How I Made a Hundred Movies in Hollywood and Never Lost a Dime, new ed. New York: Da Capo. ISBN 0-306-80874-9
- Dargis, Manohla (2007). "Hollywood Shines on Sundance; Independent Film Gets Burned," New York Times, section 2 ("Arts & Leisure), pp. 1, 19, January 21.
- Epstein, Edward Jay (2005). The Big Picture: The New Logic of Money and Power in Hollywood. New York: Random House. ISBN 1-4000-6353-1
- Finler, Joel W. (2003). The Hollywood Story, 3d ed. London and New York: Wallflower. ISBN 1-903364-66-3
- Halbfinger, David M. (2007). "Summer Cinema's One-Week Wonders," New York Times, July 18 (available online).
- Holman, Curt (2007). "Where No Fan Has Gone Before," New York Press, February 7–13 (available online).
- Leydon, Joe (1997). "100 Proof," Variety, March 2 (available online).
- Lubasch, Arnold H. (1979). "Allied Artists Seeks Help Under Bankruptcy Act; Allied Artists Files Chapter XI," New York Times, April 5.
- Mackey-Kallis, Susan (2001). The Hero and the Perennial Journey Home in American Film. Philadelphia: University of Pennsylvania Press. ISBN 0-8122-3606-8
- Maslin, Janet (1997). "An Orgy of Bent Fenders and Bent Love," New York Times, March 21 (available online).
- Morrow, John (1996). "Cinekirbyesque: Examining Jack's Deal with Empire Pictures," Jack Kirby Collector 12 (July).
- Nelson, Rob (2007). "Cannes and Abel," Village Voice, May 30 – June 5 (available online).
- O'Connor, John J. (1995). "Horror Hero of the 90s, Half Man, Half Bomb," New York Times, July 11 (available online).
- Petit, Chris (1999). "The Winged Serpent (aka Q—The Winged Serpent)," in Time Out Film Guide, 8th ed., ed. John Pym. London et al.: Penguin, p. 1172. ISBN 0-14-028365-X
- Prince, Stephen (2002). A New Pot of Gold: Hollywood Under the Electronic Rainbow, 1980–1989. Berkeley: University of California Press. ISBN 0-520-23266-6
- Rockoff, Adam (2002). Going to Pieces: The Rise and Fall of the Slasher Film, 1978–1986. Jefferson, N.C., and London: McFarland. ISBN 0-7864-1227-5
- Russell, Carolyn R. (2001). The Films of Joel and Ethan Coen. Jefferson, N.C., and London: McFarland. ISBN 0-7864-0973-8
- Sapolsky, Barry S., and Fred Molitor (1996). "Content Trends in Contemporary Horror Films," in Horror Films: Current Research on Audience Preferences and Reactions, ed. James B. Weaver. Mahwah, N.J.: Lawrence Erlbaum, pp. 33–48. ISBN 0-8058-1174-5
- Scott, A. O. (2005). "Where Have All the Howlers Gone?" New York Times, "Arts & Leisure," December 18.
- Scott, A. O. (2009). "Truck Heist Hits a Skid in a B Movie With a Soul," New York Times, December 5 (available online).
- Strange, Adario (2007). "Inside the Grindhouse," New York Press, February 7–13 (available online).
- Warren, Bill (2001). The Evil Dead Companion. New York: St. Martin's. ISBN 0-312-27501-3
- Williams, Ruth Ann (2005). The Erotic Thriller in Contemporary Cinema. Bloomington: Indiana University Press. ISBN 0-253-21836-5
- Zeitchik, Steven, and Nicole Laporte (2006). "Atomic Label Proves a Blast for Fox," Variety, November 19 (available online Archived 2010-01-21 at the Wayback Machine).
