= Braudy =

Braudy is a surname. Notable people with the surname include:

- Dorothy Braudy, American artist
- Leo Braudy (born 1941), American English professor
- Susan Braudy (born 1941), American author and journalist
