= Steve Yeager (disambiguation) =

Steve Yeager (born 1948) is an American baseball player.

Steve Yeager may also refer to:

- Steve Yeager (filmmaker) (born 1948), American filmmaker known for collaborations with John Waters
- Steve Yeager (politician) (born 1978), American attorney and speaker of the Nevada State Assembly
