= Robert Maier =

American film producer

Robert Maier (born December 26, 1950, in Salisbury, Maryland) is an American writer, director, producer and production manager, best known for his long collaboration with filmmaker John Waters.

== Early life ==
Maier moved to the Baltimore suburb of Towson, Maryland, in 1954. In 1973, after graduating from The American University in Washington, D.C. he moved to Baltimore's Fells Point neighborhood, where he first connected with John Waters' Dreamland studios group.

== Film career ==
Maier worked with filmmaker John Waters for fifteen years as a production executive on Waters' films Polyester, Hairspray, Desperate Living, Female Trouble, and Cry-Baby. Maiers first film was the 30-minute underground film Love Letter to Edie (1974), a documentary on the life and career of Edith Massey, a regular actress in the John Waters films. It has played around the world for thirty years, been excerpted for programs on Channel 4, the Discovery Channel, the Criterion Collection, and New Line Cinema's John Waters boxed set. A remastered DVD version includes his "expanded director's cut".

Maier is a multimedia producer, writer, and director with a wide range of documentary, corporate and instructional TV experience. Other than Waters, he also worked with a dozen other low-budget movie-makers in Baltimore and New York City. Maier has numerous feature film credits. For New Line Cinema in New York, he was line producer of the award-winning Alone in the Dark, and the original Hairspray. Other New York independent feature credits include The House on Sorority Row, Fastlane, The Fox Affair, and Downtown 81. He was also line producer of four feature-length world music documentaries for by documentarian Robert Mugge.

He lived for seven years in the 1970s and 1980s in the New York City area, then returned to Baltimore for several years. In 1989, he moved to Davidson, North Carolina where he worked in Charlotte as a public TV production executive and independent producer. During that time, he traveled extensively throughout the United States, Europe, and the Middle East, including a stint Ariana Television in Afghanistan helping to launch an educational TV network in Kabul.

His broadcast credits include the one-hour documentary Trappist which appeared on PBS, ABC and NBC networks, and a six-hour series for PBS, Seapower: A Global Journey. His half-hour documentary Nativity airs regularly as a Christmas special on PBS and the Trinity Broadcasting Network.

In non-broadcast production, Maier was the co-writer/producer of a 15-hour teacher development series, Creating the Learning Centered School, and 8 hours of productions for the Skylink Family and School Network. He has produced dozens of instructional videos, TV spots, marketing films, and two PBS how-to series, The Spirit of Cross Stitch and Homestretch.

Beginning in 2012 his interest in independent and art films led him to create several indie film series. They included The Davidson Film Club, Studio C Cinema at the Cornelius (NC) Art Center, and The Warehouse Cinema at The Warehouse Performing Art Center. They specialized in independent, documentary, foreign and classic films. He has lectured on the art of film in Celo, NC, Charlotte, NC, The Palace Theater in Chattanooga, TN.

== Academic career and books ==
Maier is the author of two textbooks: Handbook of Location Scouting and Management (Focal Press) and Guide to Essential Audio and Video Production (Full Page Publishing). He has taught graduate-level production courses at The American University's Summer Film and Video Institute and presented production workshops at the University of Maryland, Florida State University, Johns Hopkins University, Towson State University, and Davidson College.

Maier also wrote a 348-page memoir, Low Budget Hell: Making Underground Movies with John Waters that describes his experiences on Waters' and other low-budget films in the 1970s and 80s, ISBN 0983770808]. He has been a regular contributor to The Wrap and Indiewire.

Maier earned a BA (Literature) from The American University and an MA in English (Professional Communications) from East Carolina University.

Maier was the Department Head in the Broadcasting Production program at Gaston College for nine years. He taught basic and advanced level courses in broadcasting over a ten year period in digital audio and video production. Additionally, he designed and supervised installation of new audio and video production facilities for the program in the late 1990s and into the 2020s. They included a multi-track digital recording studio and a high definition multi-camera digital video studio, including several video and audio editing rooms, and an Internet Radio production facility with tie-lines to the college broadcast radio station, WSGE-91.7 FM. This included five field portable digital recording packages.
