= Love Letter to Edie =

- VHS front cover
- Directed by: Robert Maier
- Written by: Robert Maier and Edith Massey
- Produced by: Robert Maier
- Release date: 1975
- Running time: 15 minutes 30 minutes (DVD)
- Country: United States
- Language: English

Love Letter to Edie is a 1975 American short documentary by Robert Maier. The film is about actress Edith Massey who starred in many John Waters films such as Desperate Living, Pink Flamingos, Multiple Maniacs, and Female Trouble. The film follows Edith Massey around her Baltimore thrift store, and includes fantasy sequences and stories about her past.

== Cast ==
- Edith Massey as herself
- John Waters as himself
- Mink Stole as Blonde Wicked Stepsister
- Delores Delux as L.A. Showgirl
- Pat Moran as Red-Headed Wicked Stepsister
- Ed Peranio as Brothel Client
- Vincent Peranio as Sailor in Bar
- Mary Vivian Pearce as Store Customer (uncredited)

== DVD release ==
The DVD release of Love Letter to Edie includes extra footage and commentary by the director. This is a director's authorized version remastered from his original 16 mm color film footage. The film was released on Blu-ray in 2019.
