= Jean Hill (actress) =

American model and actress (1946–2013)

Jean Elizabeth Hill (November 15, 1946 – August 21, 2013) was an American model and actress most notable for the role of Grizelda Brown in the 1977 film Desperate Living. Hill is considered a Dreamlander (John Waters' regular ensemble of cast members).

== Biography ==
Jean Hill was born in Baltimore, Maryland, the daughter of a city sanitation supervisor and a nurse and raised on Druid Hill Avenue in the city's Druid Heights neighborhood. She was a 1965 graduate of Frederick Douglass High School. Following high school, she earned an associate degree from Baltimore City Community College and earned a bachelor's degree in special education from what is now Coppin State University. Hill tutored special education students at School 181 in Baltimore.

Known as John Waters' "discovery", he was seeking an overweight African-American woman to play in his 1977 film Desperate Living. Waters' doorman referred her to him. In Waters' book Shock Value, he describes her as "my dream-come-true, four hundred pounds of raw talent".

In the mid-1980s Hill joined fellow Dreamlander Edith Massey in becoming a greeting card model, making her an icon of the gay community. She was a longtime supporter of LGBT rights and same-sex marriage. She was also active in local theater and performed at the Arena Players, where she directed and designed costumes.

== Death ==
Jean Hill died on August 21, 2013, in Baltimore, Maryland from renal failure at the age of 66.

== Filmography ==
| Year | Film | Role |
|---|---|---|
| 1977 | Desperate Living | Grizelda Brown |
| 1981 | Polyester | Gospel Bus Hijacker |
| 2000 | In Bad Taste | Herself |
| 2004 | A Dirty Shame | Woman on the Fire Escape |
| 2005 | All the Dirt on 'A Dirty Shame' | Herself |
| 2010 | Frances: A Mother Divine | Herself |
