= In Bad Taste =

- Directed by: Steve Yeager
- Produced by: Steve Yeager; Cindy Miller
- Starring: Steve Yeager; John Waters; The Dreamlanders
- Cinematography: Steve Yeager
- Edited by: Steve Yeager
- Music by: Steve Yeager
- Distributed by: Fox Video
- Release date: March 23, 2000
- Running time: 100 minutes
- Country: United States
- Language: English

In Bad Taste is a 2000 documentary film from Steve Yeager following the cinematic career of American filmmaker John Waters, and includes interviews with Waters and his ensemble cast, known as the Dreamlanders.

== Cast ==
- Steve Yeager
- John Waters
- Divine
- Steve Buscemi
- Johnny Depp
- Ricki Lake
- Jean Hill
- Danny Mills
- Edith Massey
- Mink Stole
- Susan Lowe
- Sam Waterston
- Kathleen Turner
- David Lochary
- Channing Wilroy
- Jeanine Basinger
- Debbie Harry
- Patricia Hearst
- Lloyd Kaufman
- David O. Russell
- Nick Zedd
