= Divine Waters =

- Directed by: Vito Zagarrio
- Starring: Divine; John Waters
- Music by: Edith Massey
- Release date: 1985
- Running time: 110 minutes
- Country: United States
- Language: English

Divine Waters is a documentary film released in 1985 (shot in 1981) featuring Divine and John Waters, along with Waters' father John Waters Sr. and sister Trish Waters.

== Synopsis ==
This documentary focuses on the careers of influential partners in trash film, John Waters and Divine. The film includes interviews with Waters' parents and sister, actress Edith Massey sings two songs ("Punks, Get off the Grass" and "Fever"), as well as a live performance of Divine performing his song "Born to Be Cheap".

== Cast ==
- Divine
- John Waters
- John Waters Sr.
- Trish Waters
- Edith Massey
