= Polyester (film) =

1981 film by John Waters

- Theatrical release poster
- Directed by: John Waters
- Written by: John Waters
- Produced by: John Waters
- Starring: Divine; Tab Hunter; Edith Massey; David Samson; Mary Garlington; Ken King; Mink Stole; Joni Ruth White; Stiv Bators
- Cinematography: David Insley
- Edited by: Charles Roggero
- Music by: Chris Stein; Michael Kamen
- Production companies: New Line Cinema; Dreamland; Michael White Productions
- Distributed by: New Line Cinema
- Release date: May 29, 1981
- Running time: 86 minutes
- Country: United States
- Language: English
- Budget: $300,000
- Box office: $1.12 million (US and Canada rentals)

Polyester is a 1981 American independent satirical black comedy film written, produced, and directed by John Waters, and starring Divine, Tab Hunter, Edith Massey, David Samson, Mary Garlington, Ken King, Mink Stole, Joni Ruth White, and Stiv Bators. It satirizes the melodrama film genre and the "woman's film" category, particularly the work of Douglas Sirk, which directly influenced this film. The film is also a satire of suburban life in the early 1980s, involving topics such as divorce, abortion, adultery, alcoholism, racial stereotypes, foot fetishism, and the religious right.

Polyester was filmed in Waters' native Baltimore, Maryland, like all of his previous films. It featured a gimmick called Odorama, whereby moviegoers could smell what they were viewing on-screen with special scratch-and-sniff cards (a stylistic tribute to the work of William Castle, whose films typically featured attention-grabbing gimmicks).

Following Stunts (1977), Polyester was among the earliest films that New Line Cinema produced.

== Plot ==
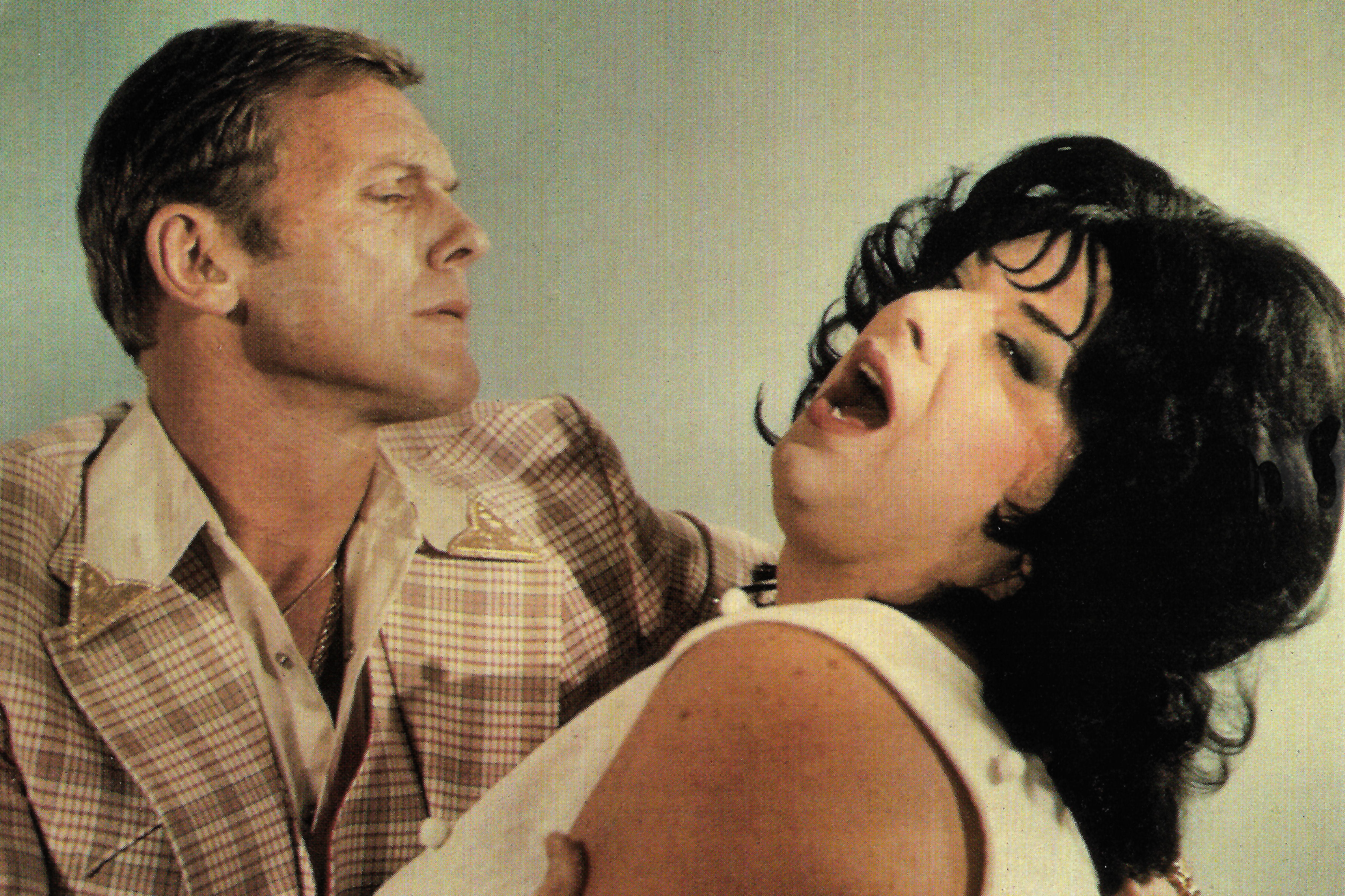
Tab Hunter and Divine in a publicity still for the film

Overweight housewife Francine Fishpaw watches her upper-middle-class family's life crumble in their suburban Baltimore home. Her husband Elmer is a polyester-clad lout who owns an adult movie theater, causing anti-pornography protesters to picket the Fishpaws' house. Francine's Christian beliefs are offended by the behavior of her teenage children—Lu-Lu, her spoiled, promiscuous daughter, and Dexter, her delinquent, glue-sniffing son who derives sexual pleasure from stomping on women's feet.

Francine's cocaine-snorting mother, La Rue, is a class-conscious snob. She compounds her daughter's troubles by robbing her blind, constantly deriding her obesity and berating her for befriending her former housecleaner Cuddles Kovinsky. Cuddles is a simple-minded woman who tries to console Francine with seize-the-day bromides and has inherited a large sum of money from a wealthy former employer.

After Francine discovers Elmer is having an affair with his secretary Sandra Sullivan, she confronts them during a motel tryst and demands a divorce. Francine then descends into alcoholism and depression, exacerbated by her children's behavior. Lu-Lu is impregnated by her degenerate boyfriend Bo-Bo Belsinger and announces she is getting an abortion. Dexter is arrested at a supermarket for stomping on a woman's foot, and the media reveals that he is the "Baltimore Foot Stomper" who has been terrorizing local women.

Lu-Lu goes to an abortion clinic, but anti-abortion picketers harass her. She returns home and tries to induce a miscarriage, causing Francine to place her in the care of a Catholic unwed mothers' home.

Bo-Bo and his friend, who have come to trash the Fishpaw house on Halloween, shoot La Rue, but she retrieves the gun and shoots Bo-Bo dead. After Lu-Lu flees the unwed mothers' home, she returns home to find Bo-Bo's body and is so distraught that she attempts suicide. Francine faints after witnessing her daughter's suicide attempt—and the apparent suicide by hanging of the family dog Bonkers, based on a suicide note left near the dog's dangling body.

A rehabilitated Dexter is released from jail and becomes an artist specializing in paintings of feet. Lulu suffers a miscarriage from her suicide attempt and is contrite about her past, becoming an artistic flower child who embraces macramé. Francine quits drinking, confronts and rebukes her mother, and finds new romance with Todd Tomorrow, who runs an art-house drive-in theater. Todd proposes marriage to an elated Francine, but she soon discovers that Todd and La Rue are romantically involved and conspiring to embezzle her divorce settlement, drive her insane, and sell her children into prostitution.

Elmer and Sandra break into the house to murder Francine, but Dexter and Lu-Lu kill them: Dexter steps on Sandra's foot, causing her to accidentally shoot Elmer, and Lu-Lu uses her macramé to strangle Sandra. When Cuddles arrives with her German chauffeur/fiancé Heintz, their car runs over La Rue and Todd, killing them. Francine embraces her children while Cuddles and Heintz kiss.

== Cast ==
- Divine as Francine Fishpaw
- Tab Hunter as Todd Tomorrow
- Edith Massey as Cuddles Kovinsky
- David Samson as Elmer Fishpaw
- Mary Garlington as Lu-Lu Fishpaw
- Ken King as Dexter Fishpaw
- Mink Stole as Sandra Sullivan
- Joni Ruth White as La Rue
- Hans Kramm as Heintz
- Stiv Bators as Bo-Bo Belsinger
- Rick Breitenfeld as Dr. Arnold Quackenshaw
- Michael Watson as Freddy Ashton
- Jean Hill as gospel bus hijacker
- Mary Vivian Pearce and Sharon Niesp as nuns
- Cookie Mueller as Betty Lalinski
- Marina Melin as supermarket victim
- Susan Lowe as Shirley Evans, mall victim
- George Hulse as Principal Kirk
- Chuck Yeaton as hospital reporter
- Dorothy Braudy as abortion picketer
- George Figgs as abortion picketer
- Leo Braudy as abortion picketer

== Production ==
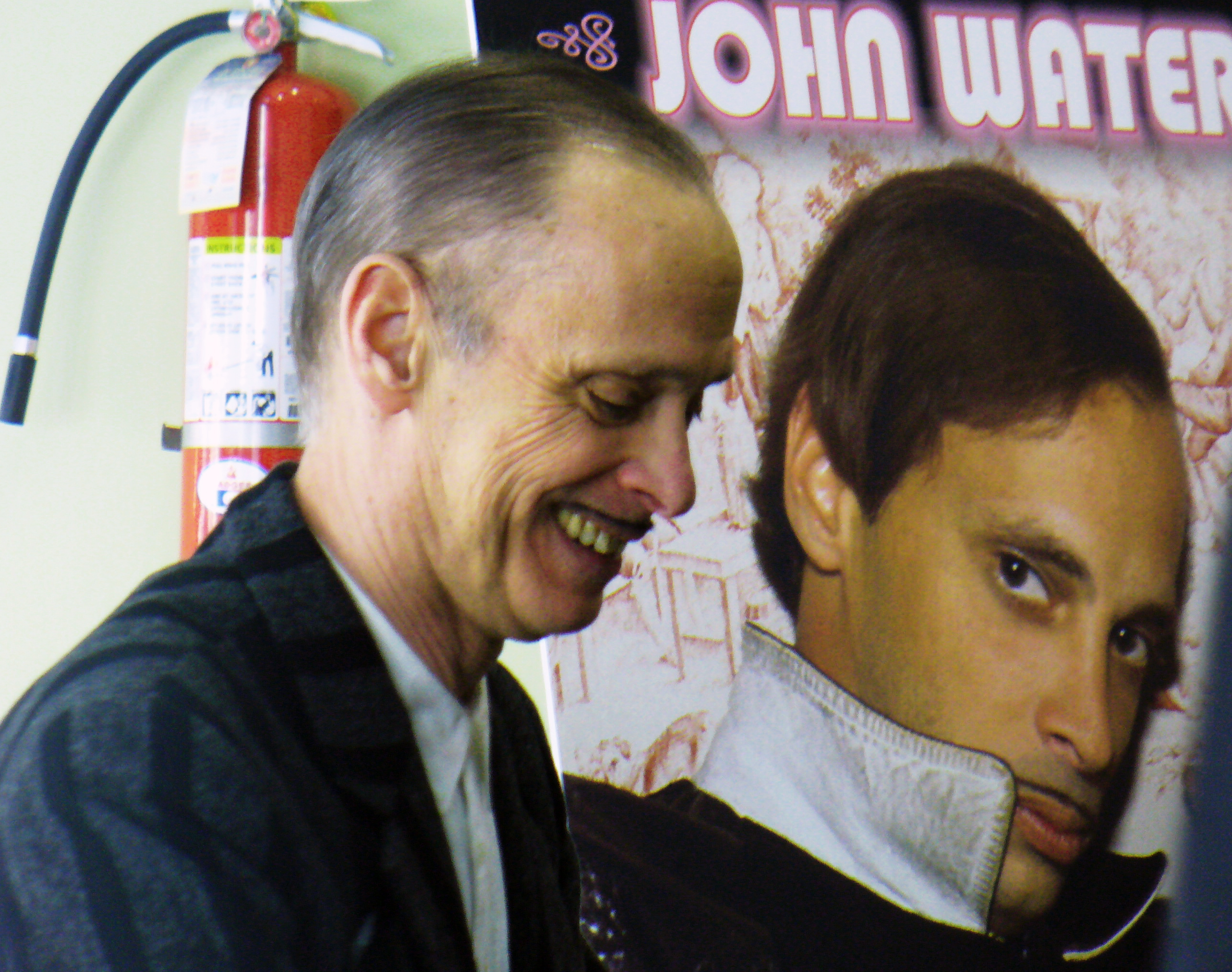
John Waters

The Dreamlanders, Waters' usual acting troupe, serve minor roles in Polyester, compared to Waters' previous films Desperate Living, Female Trouble, and Pink Flamingos, which starred several Dreamlanders in major roles. Only two, Divine and Edith Massey, receive top billing. This movie was also Massey's final collaboration with Waters before her 1984 death. Dreamlander perennials Mink Stole, Mary Vivian Pearce, Cookie Mueller, Sharon Niesp, Marina Melin, Susan Lowe, and Jean Hill have plot integral roles; however, they are much smaller compared to earlier films. Principal photography took place over the course of three weeks in October 1980.

Polyester was the first Waters film to skirt the mainstream, even garnering an R rating (his previous films were all unrated or rated X—the equivalent of the Motion Picture Association of America's present-day NC-17 rating). The film is set in a middle-class Baltimore suburb instead of its slums and bohemian neighborhoods, the setting of Waters' earlier films.

During an interview on The Ghost of Hollywood, cinematographer David Insley revealed that the helicopter used to shoot the opening scenes had to make an emergency landing on a nearby golf course while it was open. After the helicopter was cleared for safety, it was towed from the fairway using a flatbed.

This was Insley's third collaboration with Waters and his first as lead cinematographer. Insley also photographed Hairspray and Cry-Baby.

=== Music ===
Three songs are featured.

1. "Polyester" by Tab Hunter – words and music by Chris Stein and Debbie Harry
2. "Be My Daddy's Baby (Lu-Lu's Theme)" by Michael Kamen – words and music by Harry and Kamen
3. "The Best Thing" by Bill Murray – words and music by Harry and Kamen

=== Women's pictures ===
Polyester was a send-up of women's pictures, an exploitative film genre popular from the 1950 to the 1960s and typically featured bored, unfulfilled, or otherwise troubled women, usually middle-aged suburban housewives, finding release or escape through the arrival of a handsome younger man. Women's pictures were typically hackneyed B movies, but Waters specifically styled Polyester after the work of the director Douglas Sirk, asking Insley to make use of similar lighting and editing techniques, even using film equipment and movie-making techniques from Sirk's era. By chance, Insley viewed some of Sirk's films at a local screening celebrating the director.

=== Odorama ===
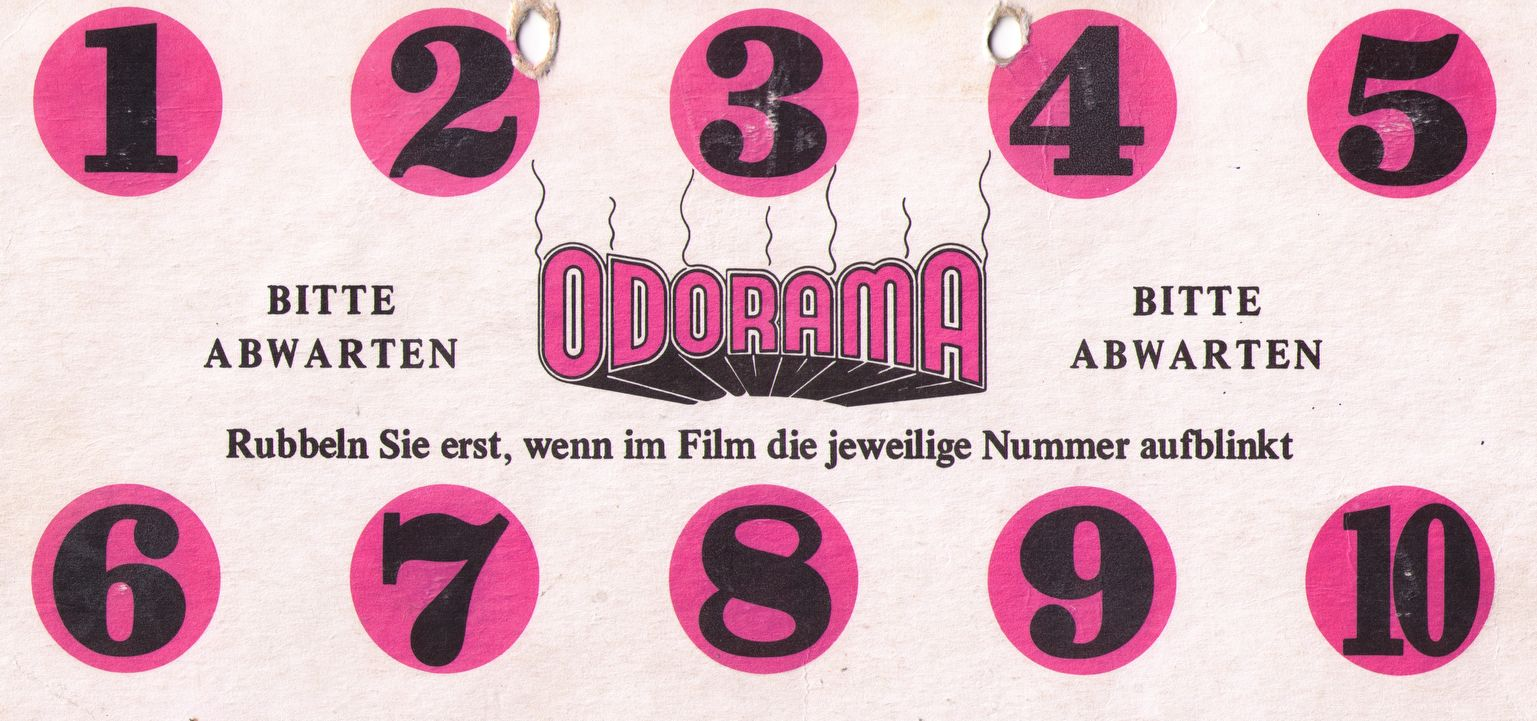
Original German Odorama card for the film

Odors, especially Francine's particularly keen sense of smell, play an important role. To highlight this, Waters designed Odorama, a "scratch-and-sniff" gimmick inspired by the work of William Castle and the 1960 film Scent of Mystery, which featured a device called Smell-O-Vision. Special cards with spots numbered 1 through 10 were distributed to audience members before the show, in the manner of 3D glasses. When a number flashed on the screen, viewers were to scratch and sniff the appropriate spot. Smells included the scent of flowers, pizza, glue, gas, freshly cut grass, and feces. For the first DVD release, the smell of glue was changed due to, as Waters states, "political correctness". The gimmick was advertised with the tag "It'll blow your nose!" After being prompted to scratch and sniff a bouquet of roses, viewers are subjected to a series of mostly foul-smelling odors, and thus fall victim to the director's prank.

The ten smells (developed by 3M per Waters in the supplements section of the DVD release) are:

1. Roses
2. Flatulence
3. Model airplane glue
4. Pizza
5. Gasoline
6. Skunk
7. Natural gas
8. New car smell
9. Dirty shoes
10. Air freshener

A video release omits the onscreen flashing numbers as well as the opening introduction explaining Odorama. This version, created by Lorimar-Telepictures, was shown on cable TV in the United States. The Independent Film Channel released reproduction Odorama cards for John Waters film festivals in 1999. Waters expressed his delight at having audiences actually "pay to smell shit" on the 2004 DVD release commentary track.

Paramount Pictures used the Odorama name and logo as part of the Rugrats Go Wild release in 2003, upsetting Waters when he learned that New Line Cinema had let the trademark lapse. The 2011 film Spy Kids: All the Time in the World used a scratch-and-sniff card branded "Aromascope", advertised as providing the fourth dimension in its "4D" format.

Odorama cards were recreated by Midnight Movies, Little Joe Magazine, and The Aroma Company to allow viewers to interact with Polyester as intended for a screening at the Edinburgh International Film Festival in June 2011.

== Critical response ==
Polyester received some positive reviews from the mainstream press. Janet Maslin of The New York Times wrote:

Ordinarily, Mr. Waters is not everyone's cup of tea — but Polyester, which opens today at the National and other theaters, is not Mr. Waters' ordinary movie. It's a very funny one, with a hip, stylized humor that extends beyond the usual limitations of his outlook. This time, the comic vision is so controlled and steady that Mr. Waters need not rely so heavily on the grotesque touches that make his other films such perennial favorites on the weekend Midnight Movie circuit. Here's one that can just as well be shown in the daytime.

On the review aggregator website Rotten Tomatoes, the film holds an approval rating of 94% based on 31 reviews, with an average rating of 7.1/10. The website's critics consensus reads, "As proudly tacky as its titular fabric, Polyester finds writer-director John Waters moving ever so slightly into the mainstream without losing any of his subversive charm."

== In popular culture ==
The 2000 single "Frontier Psychiatrist" by the Australian electronic music group The Avalanches samples the film.
