= B movies in the 1950s =

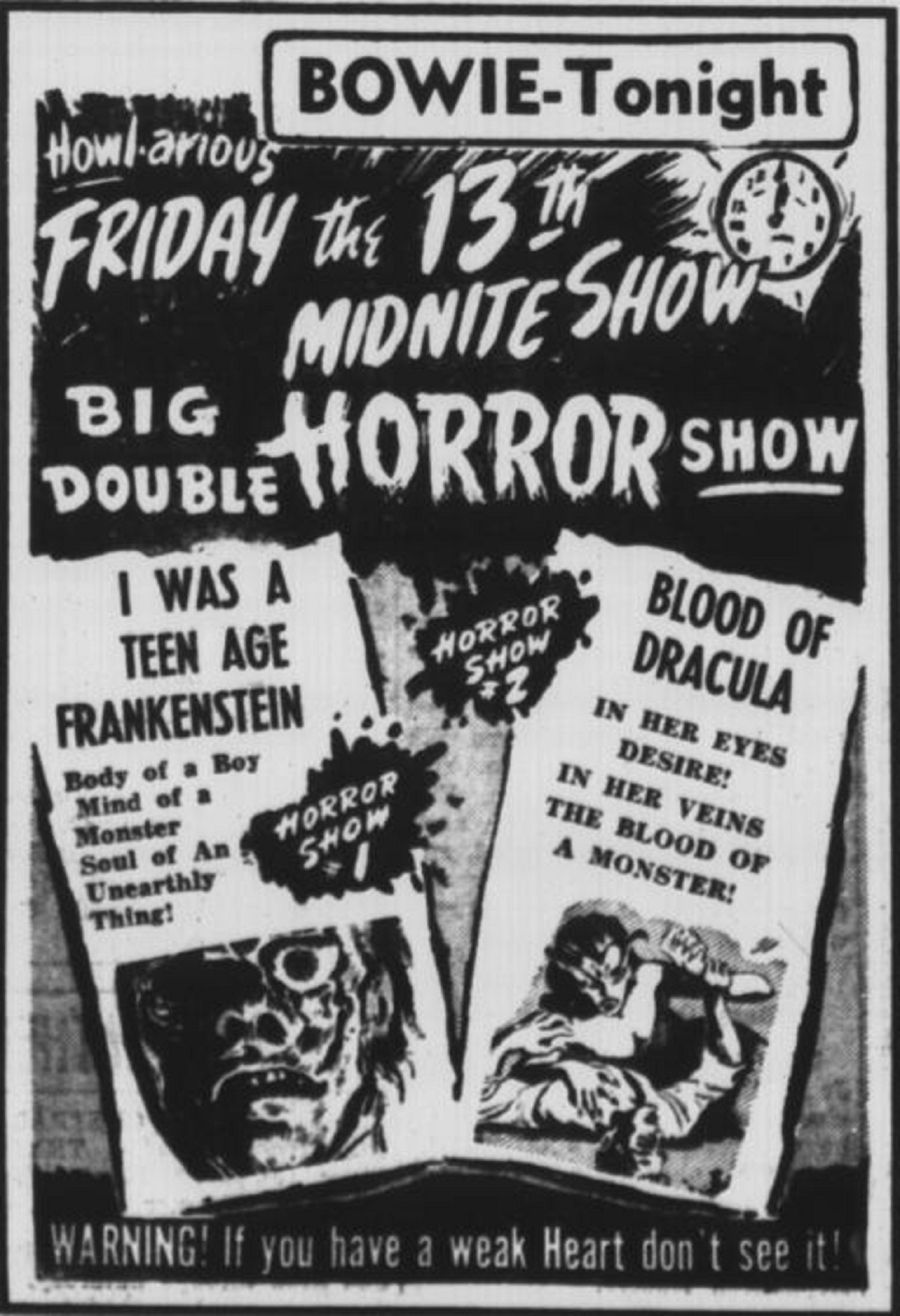
1957 theater advertisement for midnight screening of double-feature B movie horror films, I Was a Teenage Frankenstein and Blood of Dracula

The 1950s mark a significant change in the definition of the B movie. The transformation of the film industry due to court rulings that brought an end to many long-standing distribution practices as well as the challenge of television led to major changes in U.S. cinema at the exhibition level. These shifts signaled the eventual demise of the double feature that had defined much of the American moviegoing experience during Hollywood's Golden Age of the 1930s and 1940s. Even as the traditional bottom-of-the-bill second feature slowly disappeared, the term B movie was applied more broadly to the sort of inexpensive genre films that came out during the era, such as those produced to meet the demands of the burgeoning drive-in theater market.

== Fadeout of the classic B ==
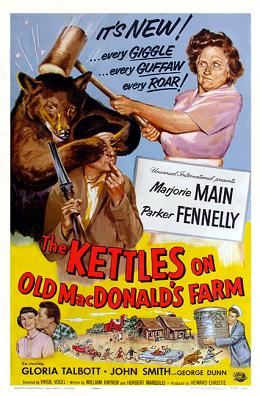
The Kettles on Old MacDonald's Farm (1957), from Universal, was the final installment of the last "B series" put out by a major studio.

In 1948, a Supreme Court ruling in a federal antitrust suit against the leading Hollywood studios, the so-called Big Five, outlawed block booking and led to the divestiture of the majors' theater chains over the next few years. After barely inching forward in the 1930s, the average U.S. feature production cost had essentially doubled through the 1940s, reaching an average $1 million by the turn of the decade (the increase from 1940 to 1950 was 150 percent in simple terms, 93 percent after adjusting for inflation). With audiences draining away to television and other economic pressures forcing the studios to scale back production schedules, the Golden Age–style double feature began disappearing from American theaters.

At the beginning of the 1950s, most U.S. movie houses still programmed double features at least part of the time. The major studios promoted the benefits of recycling, offering former headlining movies as second features in the place of traditional B films. Their longer running time appears to have both accommodated and hastened the progressive abandonment of the traditional "variety program" of newsreel/cartoon/short preceding the feature presentations at many theaters. With television airing many classic Westerns as well as producing its own original Western series, the cinematic market for B oaters in particular was drying up.

The first prominent victim of the changing market was the Poverty Row studio Eagle-Lion, which released its last films in 1951. By 1953, the old Monogram brand had disappeared, the company having adopted the identity of its higher-end subsidiary, Allied Artists. The following year, Allied released Hollywood's last two B series Westerns, starring Wayne Morris: The Desperado in June and Two Guns and a Badge in September. Non-series B Westerns would continue to come out for a few more years, but Republic Pictures, long associated with cheap sagebrush sagas, was out of the filmmaking business by the end of the decade. In other genres, Universal maintained B series featuring Abbott and Costello (through 1955), Francis the Talking Mule (through 1956), and Ma and Pa Kettle (through 1957). Allied Artists kept its Bomba, the Jungle Boy series going through 1955; Allied's Bowery Boys finished their run in 1958—the end of the longest feature series in movie history (48 films, altogether) and the last B series from one of Hollywood's Golden Age studios.

The most B oriented of the Big Five, RKO Pictures, weakened by what one studio historian describes as its "systematic seven-year rape" by former owner Howard Hughes, abandoned the movie industry in 1957. Hollywood's A product was getting longer—the top ten box-office releases of 1940 had averaged 112.5 minutes; the average length of 1955's top ten was 123.4. In their modest way, the B's were following suit. The age of the hour-long feature film was now past; at 69 minutes, Two Guns and a Badge was about as short as Hollywood features ran. In sum, the Golden Age–style second feature was dying. B movie, however, continued to be used in a broader sense, referring to any low-budget genre film featuring relatively unheralded performers ("B actors"). The term retained its earlier suggestion that such movies relied on formulaic plots, "stock" character types, and simplistic action or unsophisticated comedy. At the same time, the realm of the B movie was becoming increasingly fertile territory for experimentation, both serious and outlandish.

== Mutating genres ==
Ida Lupino, well known as an actress, established herself as Hollywood's sole female director of the era. In short, low-budget pictures made for the production company she ran with her husband Collier Young, The Filmakers, Lupino explored virtually taboo subjects such as rape in 1950s Outrage (released by RKO) and 1953's self-explanatory The Bigamist (an entirely independent project). Her most famous directorial effort, The Hitch-Hiker (1953), was another RKO release. Often referred to as the only classic film noir directed by a woman, it made a virtue of its small budget with an unusually intense focus on its three lead characters.

That same year, RKO put out another historically notable film made at low cost and with an only faintly starry cast: the 85-minute-long Split Second comes to a head in a desert ghost town about to become a nuclear blast site, making it perhaps the first example of an "atomic noir." The most famous such movie, Kiss Me Deadly (1955), independently produced by Victor Saville and his Parklane Pictures company, typifies the persistently murky middle ground between the A and B picture. Film historian Richard Maltby identifies it as a "programmer capable of occupying either half of a neighbourhood theatre's double-bill [and] budgeted at approximately $400,000. [Its] distributor, United Artists, released around twenty-five programmers with production budgets between $100,000 and $400,000 in 1955. For UA, these movies served to spread the overhead costs of their distribution operation rather than to make profits in themselves." The film's length, 106 minutes, is A level, but its star, Ralph Meeker, had previously appeared in only one major film. It is based on an unequivocally pulpy source, one of Mickey Spillane's Mike Hammer novels, but is directed in a self-consciously aestheticized fashion by Robert Aldrich. The result is a brutal genre picture that chillingly evokes contemporary anxieties about what was often spoken of simply as the Bomb.

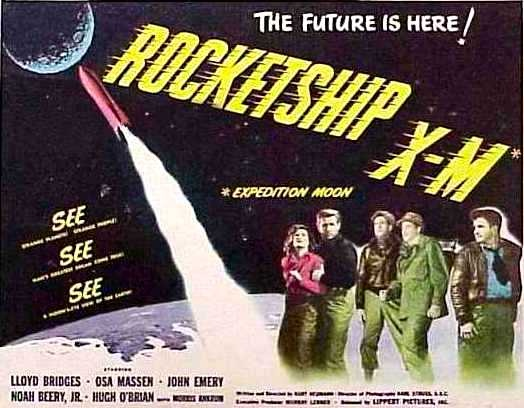
Rocketship X-M (1950), produced and released by small Lippert Pictures, is cited as possibly "the first postnuclear holocaust film." It was at the leading edge of a large cycle of movies, mostly low-budget and many long forgotten, classifiable as "atomic bomb cinema."

The fear of nuclear war with the Soviet Union, along with less expressible qualms about the effects of radioactive fallout from America's own atomic tests, energized many of the era's genre films. Science fiction, horror, and various hybrids of the two were now of central economic importance to the low-budget end of the business. Most down-market films of the type—like many of those produced by William Alland at Universal (e.g., Creature from the Black Lagoon [1954]) and Sam Katzman at Columbia (e.g., It Came from Beneath the Sea [1955])—provided little more than simple diversion. But these were genres whose fantastic nature could also be used as cover for mordant cultural observations often difficult to make in mainstream movies.

Two well-financed films of 1951, The Thing from Another World and The Day the Earth Stood Still, are often mentioned as vanguard examples, but scholar Richard Hodgens argues that they are beasts of a different sort: The Thing "proved that some money could be made by 'science fiction' that preyed on current fears symbolized crudely by any preposterous monster." Its fellow traveller was a thriller with a simplistic moral: "Earthlings, behave yourselves." The era's most provocative and unsettling fantasies were made for B-level money. Director Don Siegel's Invasion of the Body Snatchers (1956), produced by Walter Wanger for $300,000 and released by Allied Artists, treats conformist pressures and the evil of banality in haunting, allegorical fashion. Even the majors' genre mills at times came out with challenging films. Produced on a "trifling budget" by Katzman, The Man Who Turned to Stone (1957), "uses the physical transfer of the life force from one class to another as a metaphor for economic expropriation." Among the most disturbing was The Amazing Colossal Man (1957), written, directed, and produced by Bert I. Gordon. A "King Kong for the atomic age", it is both a monster movie that happens to depict the horrific effects of radiation exposure and "a ferocious cold-war fable [that] spins Korea, the army's obsessive secrecy, and America's post-war growth into one fantastic whole."

== AIP and Corman ==
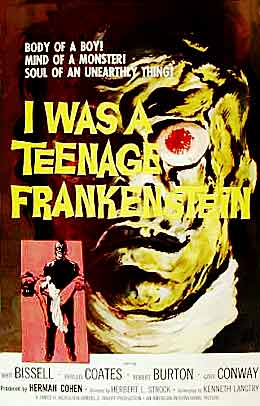
When one of AIP's movies hit, the company was able to take advantage quickly. I Was a Teenage Werewolf premiered June 19, 1957. I Was a Teenage Frankenstein, also produced and cowritten by Herman Cohen, opened just five months later.

The Amazing Colossal Man was released by a new company whose name was much bigger than its budgets. American International Pictures (AIP), founded in 1956 by James H. Nicholson and Samuel Z. Arkoff in a reorganization of their American Releasing Corporation (ARC), soon became the leading U.S. studio devoted entirely to B-priced productions. American International helped keep the original-release double bill alive through paired packages of its films: these movies were low-budget, but the economic model was different from that of the traditional B movie—instead of a flat rate, they were rented out on a percentage basis, like A films. I Was a Teenage Werewolf (1957) is perhaps the best known AIP film of the era. Guided by experienced genre writer-producer Herman Cohen, the movie starred a twenty-year-old Michael Landon. As its title suggests, AIP sought audiences not only with fantastic genre subjects, but also with new, teen-oriented angles. One exemplary film, Daddy-O (a.k.a. Out on Probation; 1958), sported the tagline "Alive!! With the Beat and the Heat of Today's Rock-N-Roll Generation!" If Hot Rod Gang (1958) worked, then why wouldn't hot rod horror? Result: Ghost of Dragstrip Hollow (1959). AIP is credited with having "led the way...in demographic exploitation, target marketing, and saturation booking, all of which would become standard procedure for the majors in planning and releasing their mass-market 'event' films" by the late 1970s.

At least in terms of content, the majors were already there, putting out low-budget "J.D." movies such as Warner Bros.' Untamed Youth (1957), starring Mamie Van Doren, and MGM's High School Confidential (1958), with Van Doren and Russ Tamblyn. In Bill Osgerby's description, these films "purported to preach against the 'evils' of juvenile crime, yet simultaneously provided young audiences with the vicarious thrills of delinquent rebellion", a gambit as old as St. Augustine, if not the Hollywood hills themselves. Variety's review of the Van Doren vehicle Girls Town (1959) declared, "The screenplay of the film is as flimsy as a G-string, and designed for somewhat the same purpose. It includes all the staples of the exploitation film—a drag race, a necking party, the flip and shallow conversation of a segment of youth, the slight and unconvincing nod to conventional morality at the ending."

In 1954, a young filmmaker named Roger Corman received his first screen credits as writer and associate producer of Allied Artists' Highway Dragnet. Later that year, he independently produced his first movie, The Monster from the Ocean Floor, on a $12,000 budget and a six-day shooting schedule. In 1955, Corman produced and directed the first official ARC release, Apache Woman, one of five movies he had a hand in directing that year. Within a few months he would direct Day the World Ended, half of Arkoff and Nicholson's first twin-bill package, and one of the first AIP films, It Conquered the World. Corman would go on to direct over fifty feature films through 1990. As of 2007, he remained active as a producer, with more than 350 movies to his credit. Often referred to as the "King of the B's", the historically sensitive Corman has said that "to my way of thinking, I never made a 'B' movie in my life", as B movies, in the classic Hollywood sense of the term, were dying out by the time he began making pictures. He prefers to describe his metier as "low-budget exploitation films." In later years Corman, both with AIP and as head of his own companies, would help launch the careers of Francis Ford Coppola, Peter Bogdanovich, Jonathan Demme, Robert Towne, Jack Nicholson, and Robert De Niro, among many others.

== New trends in exhibition ==
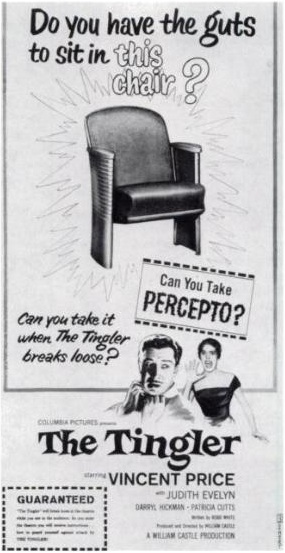
An ad for The Tingler (1959), focusing on William Castle's Percepto gimmick. "GUARANTEED: 'The Tingler' will break loose in the theatre while you are in the audience. As you enter the theatre you will receive instructions how to guard yourself against attack by THE TINGLER!"

In the late 1950s, William Castle was even better known as a B filmmaker than Corman. A long-time director and producer of mostly low-end movies for Columbia, including several entries in the studio's Whistler detective series, he left in 1957 to establish the independent Susina Productions with writer Robb White. Castle was the great innovator of the B-movie publicity gimmick. Audiences of Macabre (1958), an $86,000 production distributed by Allied Artists, were invited to take out insurance policies to cover potential death from fright. With this film and his next collaboration with White, House on Haunted Hill (1958), another Allied release, Castle "combine[d] the saturation advertising campaign perfected by Columbia and Universal in their Sam Katzman and William Alland packages with centralized and standardized publicity stunts and gimmicks that had previously been the purview of the local exhibitor." Castle and White's 1959 creature feature The Tingler, distributed by Columbia, featured his most famous gimmick, Percepto: at the film's climax, buzzers attached to select theater seats would unexpectedly rattle a few audience members, prompting either appropriate screams or even more appropriate laughter.

The growth of the drive-in theater market was one of the major spurs to the expansion of the independent low-budget film industry. As of January 1, 1945, there were 96 drive-ins in the United States; a decade later, the number had passed 3,700. Unpretentious pictures with simple, familiar plots and reliable shock effects—that is, B pictures in both production values and aesthetic spirit if not by the older, more precise industrial definition—were ideally suited for auto-based film viewing, with all its attendant distractions. The phenomenon of the drive-in movie became one of the defining symbols of American popular culture in the 1950s. Over the course of the decade, many local television stations began showing B genre films in late-night slots, popularizing the notion of the midnight movie. In the spring of 1954, Los Angeles TV station KABC expanded on the concept by having an appropriately offbeat host introduce the films: on Saturday nights, The Vampira Show, with Maila Nurmi as the titular MC, screened low-budget horror and suspense movies, including at least one that would become a cult classic—Edgar G. Ulmer's Detour, produced in 1945 for $117,000. Variations on the Vampira format were soon running at stations around the country.

Increasingly, American-made genre films were being joined by overseas movies acquired cheaply and, in the case of foreign-language films, dubbed for the U.S. market. Between 1951 and 1955, small Lippert Pictures and low-budget British studio Hammer Film Productions had a distribution deal that brought such pictures as Stolen Face (1952) and Spaceways (1953) across the Atlantic to a few American screens. In 1957, Hammer initiated its trademark star pairing of Peter Cushing and Christopher Lee with The Curse of Frankenstein, made on a budget of $400,000 or less. The film was shot in Technicolor as "a crucial element in avoiding the supporting-feature fate of Hammer's previous American releases...and to add an extra emphasis to the unprecedented levels of onscreen gore that the film offered as its major attraction." Warner Bros. handled the film's global distribution. It grossed over $3 million around the world in its first year, and its influence on B-budget horror productions such as Corman's Poe adaptations for AIP and Italian films of the early 1960s would soon be evident (see 1960s B movies). Hammer, which had made a deal with Universal to ensure that the American major wouldn't sue for copyright infringement of its 1930s Frankenstein classics, ultimately acquired remake rights to a number of Universal properties. This led to Hammer's Dracula (1958; released in the U.S. as Horror of Dracula), made for £81,412 ($228,768), and The Mummy (1959), both distributed very profitably by Universal.

Promoter Joseph E. Levine was the crucial U.S. figure in exploiting the opportunities offered by foreign genre production. In 1956, low-budget producer Richard Kay acquired a Japanese creature feature, Godzilla, for $30,000. Levine financed the shooting of new footage with American actor Raymond Burr that was edited into the film—the total cost to the U.S. partnership was less than $100,000. The Americanized version, Godzilla, King of the Monsters!, was distributed on the East Coast by Levine's Embassy Pictures. Levine himself came up with a string of taglines: "Fantastic beyond comprehension, beyond compare—Astounding beyond belief!", "Terror staggers the mind as the gargantuan creature of the sea surges up on a tidal wave of destruction to wreak vengeance on the Earth!", and many more. Godzilla, King of the Monsters! was a B-market hit, grossing over $2 million in its original run. In 1959, Embassy acquired the worldwide rights to a cheaply made movie starring an American-born bodybuilder as one of the original superheroes. Steve Reeves had appeared in all of two films previously; his debut was in the independent production Jail Bait (1954), directed by Ed Wood On top of a $125,000 purchase price for his import, Levine then spent $1.5 million on advertising and publicity, a virtually unprecedented amount. The New York Times was nonplussed: "Hercules, an Italianmade spectacle film dubbed in English, is the kind of picture that normally would draw little more than yawns in the film market. It would have, that is, had it not been that promoter Joseph E. Levine has launched the movie throughout the country with a deafening barrage of publicity. The exploitation film, which has been taken over by Warner Brothers for distribution, opened yesterday at 135 theatres in the New York area alone." Levine counted on opening-weekend box office for his profits, booking the film "into as many cinemas as he could for a week's run, then withdrawing it before poor word-of-mouth withdrew it for him." The strategy was a smashing success: the film earned $4.7 million in domestic rentals alone. Just as valuable to the bottom line, it was even more successful overseas. Within a few decades, Hollywood would be dominated by both movies and an exploitation philosophy very like Levine's.

== Sources ==
- Allison, Anne (2006). Millennial Monsters: Japanese Toys and the Global Imagination. Berkeley, Los Angeles, and London: University of California Press. ISBN 0-520-22148-6
- Auty, Chris (1999). "The Amazing Colossal Man", in Time Out Film Guide, 8th edn, ed. John Pym. London et al.: Penguin, p. 24. ISBN 0-14-028365-X
- Braucort, Guy (1972 [1970]). "Interview with Don Siegel", in Focus on the Science Fiction Film, ed. William Johnson. Englewood Cliffs, N.J.: Prentice-Hall, pp. 74–76. ISBN 0-13-795161-2
- Buhle, Paul, and David Wagner (2003). Hide in Plain Sight: The Hollywood Blacklistees in Film and Television, 1950-2002. New York: Palgrave Macmillan. ISBN 1-4039-6144-1
- Cook, David A. (2000). Lost Illusions: American Cinema in the Shadow of Watergate and Vietnam, 1970–1979. Berkeley, Los Angeles, and London: University of California Press. ISBN 0-520-23265-8
- Corman, Roger, with Jim Jerome (1998). How I Made a Hundred Movies in Hollywood and Never Lost a Dime, new ed. New York: Da Capo. ISBN 0-306-80874-9
- Denisoff, R. Serge, and William D. Romanowski (1991). Risky Business: Rock in Film. New Brunswick, N.J.: Transaction. ISBN 0-88738-843-4
- Di Franco, J. Philip, ed. (1979). The Movie World of Roger Corman. New York and London: Chelsea House. ISBN 0-87754-050-0
- Epstein, Edward Jay (2005). The Big Picture: The New Logic of Money and Power in Hollywood. New York: Random House. ISBN 1-4000-6353-1
- Finler, Joel W. (2003). The Hollywood Story, 3d ed. London and New York: Wallflower. ISBN 1-903364-66-3
- Heffernan, Kevin (2004). Ghouls, Gimmicks, and Gold: Horror Films and the American Movie Business, 1953–1968. Durham, N.C., and London: Duke University Press. ISBN 0-8223-3215-9
- Hirschhorn, Clive (1979). The Warner Bros. Story. New York: Crown. ISBN 0-517-53834-2
- Hodgens, Richard (1972 [1959]). "A Brief, Tragical History of the Science Fiction Film", in Focus on the Science Fiction Film, ed. William Johnson. Englewood Cliffs, N.J.: Prentice-Hall, pp. 78–90. ISBN 0-13-795161-2
- Kinsey, Wayne (2005). Hammer Films: The Bray Studios Years. Richmond, UK: Reynolds & Hearn. ISBN 1-903111-44-7
- Lasky, Betty (1989). RKO: The Biggest Little Major of Them All. Santa Monica, Calif.: Roundtable. ISBN 0-915677-41-5
- Lev, Peter (2003). Transforming the Screen: 1950–1959. New York et al.: Thomson-Gale. ISBN 0-684-80495-6
- Loy, R. Philip (2004). Westerns in a Changing America, 1955–2000. Jefferson, N.C., and London: McFarland. ISBN 0-7864-1871-0
- Maltby, Richard (2000). "'The Problem of Interpretation...': Authorial and Institutional Intentions In and Around Kiss Me Deadly", Screening the Past (June 30) (available online Archived 2012-05-05 at the Wayback Machine).
- McCarthy, Todd, and Charles Flynn, eds. (1975). Kings of the Bs: Working Within the Hollywood System—An Anthology of Film History and Criticism. New York: E.P. Dutton. ISBN 0-525-47378-5
- Nason, Richard (1959). "Weak 'Hercules'; Italian-Made Spectacle Opens at 135 Theatres", New York Times, July 23 (available online).
- Osgerby, Bill (2003). "Sleazy Riders: Exploitation, "Otherness", and Transgression in the 1960s Biker Movie", Journal of Popular Film and Television (September 22) (available online).
- Reid, John Howard (2005). Movie Westerns: Hollywood Films the Wild, Wild West. Morrisville, N.C.: Lulu. ISBN 1-4116-6610-0
- Schatz, Thomas (1999 [1997]). Boom and Bust: American Cinema in the 1940s. Berkeley, Los Angeles, and London: University of California Press. ISBN 0-520-22130-3
- Segrave, Kerry (1992). Drive-In Theaters: A History from Their Inception in 1933. Jefferson, N.C., and London: McFarland. ISBN 0-89950-752-2
- Shapiro, Jerome F. (2002). Atomic Bomb Cinema: The Apocalyptic Imagination on Film. New York and London: Routledge. ISBN 0-415-93659-4
- Strawn, Linda May (1975 [1974]). "Samuel Z. Arkoff [interview]", in McCarthy and Flynn, Kings of the Bs, pp. 255–66.
