= Steve Yeager (filmmaker) =

American director and writer (born 1948)

- Born: 1948 (age 77–78); Baltimore, Maryland, U.S.
- Occupations: Filmmaker, educator, stage director, writer, actor
- Years active: 1970-present
- Spouse: Patty Barzyk

Steve Yeager (born 1948) is an independent filmmaker from Baltimore, Maryland, U.S. He is best known for his documentary about the indie filmmaking of fellow director John Waters, Divine Trash, which won the Filmmakers Trophy for Best Documentary at the Sundance Film Festival in 1998.

== Career overview ==
Steve Yeager got his start as a resident director at the Corner Theatre ETC, an experimental theatre company in Baltimore, Maryland (a branch of Ellen Stewart's New York-based Café La MaMa ETC), with such productions as Pigeons by Lee Dorsey and Marguerite by C. Richard Gillespie. Yeager also directed an original play entitled Chiaroscuro while working at Corner. It was during this period that Steve Yeager also had occasion to work with two emerging talents of the day: Howard Rollins, in a 1972 production of John Steinbeck's Of Mice and Men; and Kathleen Turner, who appeared in Yeager's highly regarded original adaptation of Robert Louis Stevenson's Dr. Jekyll & Mr. Hyde in 1978. After 1982, Yeager devoted his talents primarily to filmmaking endeavors. In 1985, he won the Grand Prize for Best Documentary at the Houston International Film Festival for Aquarium, a ten-minute film on the National Aquarium in Baltimore.

In 1990, Yeager released his first feature film drama, On The Block. The film offered a gritty look at life in and around The Block, Baltimore's infamous red-light district, and featured an appearance by Howard Rollins in a key role, as well as a cameo by burlesque legend Blaze Starr.

Steve Yeager's 1998 documentary film Divine Trash examines the global underground film movement, and features previously unreleased footage of John Waters' early life and behind-the-scenes capers of his Dreamland crew, including Divine, the 300-pound female impersonator Glenn Milstead. Those interviewed about the making of Pink Flamingos and the context in which it emerged include actors, critics and Baltimore's film industry people of the era. Yeager's sequel to Divine Trash, In Bad Taste, a documentary on Waters' post-Pink Flamingos career, aired in January 2000 on the Independent Film Channel. Yeager played the role of a reporter in both Pink Flamingos and Polyester.

In 2009, Steve Yeager finished work on a new narrative feature film Crystal Fog, which offers a glimpse into relationships within the gay community. The film drew its inspiration, however loosely based, from the life of Yeager's younger brother, who had died approximately twelve years earlier. The film was shot in and around Baltimore during the summer of 2008, and had its initial cast and crew screening in Baltimore in June, 2009. In 2010, Yeager began filming "The Rosens", a narrative feature film detailing the betrayal of family values between three brothers after the death of the family matriarch.

Throughout his work in film, Steve Yeager has continued to direct for the stage, generally in Washington, D.C. and Baltimore. Notable productions include Streamers by David Rabe, S.L.A.G. by David Hare, A View From The Bridge by Arthur Miller, and Michael V. Gazzo's A Hatful of Rain, voted one of the Ten Best Theatre productions of 2008 by the Baltimore City Paper.

== Young Filmmakers Workshop ==
In 2002, Yeager co-founded, along with Lane Keller, the Young Filmmakers Workshop with Steve Yeager (YFW), an organization designed to provide young people between the ages of 10–17 an opportunity to realize their dreams of becoming filmmakers, actors, and artisans through the creation of both narrative and documentary motion pictures. The resulting works are ultimately screened at a local art deco movie palace in an event that includes a red carpet premiere and awards.

== Other projects ==
In September, 2006 Yeager directed Suzanne Shepherd - A Gift of Fire, a documentary film about acclaimed New York City actor, director, and teacher Suzanne Shepherd, whose notable and varied roles include Tony Soprano's mother-in-law on the series The Sopranos, as well as featured appearances in Goodfellas, Lolita, Uncle Buck, Living Out Loud, and John Waters' A Dirty Shame.

An unfinished Yeager work, Beyond the Bridge, a biographical film about Howard Rollins, debuted at Baltimore's Senator Theater in 2007.

Yeager is co-author of a book about Divine, called My Son Divine, written with Glenn Milstead's mother Frances. He teaches film and acting-related courses at Towson University and at the University of Maryland, Baltimore County.

== Filmography ==
Year	Film Title	Function/Role	Notes
1972	Pink Flamingos	Actor; Role: Nat Kurzan, television reporter	While he was on set playing the reporter, Steve Yeager was also filming behind-the-scenes "making of" footage of John Waters and company, which would later be used in the creation of Divine Trash.
1981	Polyester	Actor; Role: Cameo	
1985	Aquarium	Director, editor	(Documentary Short) Recipient of the Grand Prize for Best Documentary at the Houston International Film Festival, 1985.
1990	On The Block	Director, Co-writer	(Drama) Cast includes Howard Rollins in a featured role.
1998	Divine Trash	Director	(Documentary) Guest appearances by John Waters, Robert Shaye, Mink Stole, Divine (archive footage), Edith Massey (archive footage), Herschell Gordon Lewis, Danny Mills, Mary Vivian Pearce, Vincent Peranio, Paul Swift, John Pierson, Hal Hartley, Steve Buscemi, Jim Jarmusch, Channing Wilroy, Mary Avara. Recipient of Filmmakers Trophy for Best Documentary at the Sundance Film Festival in 1998.
2000	In Bad Taste	Director	(Television Documentary) Follow-up film to Divine Trash. Guest appearances by John Waters, Steve Buscemi, Johnny Depp, Divine, Debbie Harry, Ricki Lake, Patricia Hearst, Danny Mills, Edith Massey, Mink Stole, Sam Waterston, Kathleen Turner, David Lochary, Channing Wilroy
2001	The Connection	Director	Narrative feature film adapted from playwright Jack Gelber's drama about heroin addiction.
2005	If The Bough Breaks	Director	(Television Documentary) Film depiction of how the medical malpractice crisis affects both doctors and patients, aired on PBS 2006.
2006	Suzanne Shepherd - A Gift of Fire	Director	
2007	The Howard Rollins Story	Director	
2009	Crystal Fog	Writer/Director/Actor	(Drama) Original script and story based loosely on the troubled life and times of Steve Yeager's late younger brother.
2010	The Rosens	Writer/Director	Original script relating strained relationships between brothers after the death of their mother.
