= Edith Massey (actress) =

American actress and singer (1918–1984)

- Massey in archive footage from Steve Yeager's 1998 documentary Divine Trash
- Born: Edith Y. Dornfeld; May 28, 1918; New York City, New York, U.S.
- Died: October 24, 1984 (aged 66); Los Angeles, California, U.S.
- Resting place: Westwood Village Memorial Park Cemetery
- Occupations: Actress, singer
- Years active: 1970–1984
- Spouse: Findley Eli Stitson (m. 1938)

Edith Massey (born Edith Y. Dornfeld; May 28, 1918 – October 24, 1984) was an American actress and singer. Massey was best known for her appearances in a series of movies by director John Waters. She was one of the Dreamlanders, Waters's stable of regular cast and crew members.

== Early life ==
Born as Edith Dornfeld on May 28, 1918, in New York City, she was the daughter of Ashkenazi Jews Bessie (née Lansnek, 1896–1925) and Samuel Dornfeld (1891–1918), an Austrian-born émigré. Samuel, who was a World War I veteran, died five months after Massey's birth due to complications as a result from a gas attack during the war.

The 1920 United States Federal Census recorded Edith, age one, living on Lewis Street in Manhattan, New York, with her three-year-old sister, Etta, and their widowed mother, Bessie, who was 22 years old. The following year, on March 9, 1921, Bessie married her second husband, Max Grodsky, in Denver, Colorado.

According to Massey's half-brother, Morris Grodsky, their parents "just threw up their hands one day, dropped off those who couldn't fend for themselves at a local orphanage or 'home,' and disappeared". According to Grodsky, who was also left there, the Jewish orphanage was not a terrible place, though he remembered being always hungry. Massey's mother died March 1, 1925.

In the 1975 documentary Love Letter to Edie, Massey said she was raised in an orphanage and eventually was placed in a foster home. Her foster family members were cruel to her and, as a teenager, she ran away to Hollywood. In the documentary Divine Waters (1981), Massey explained that she was "born in New York, but raised in Denver....I was movie crazy, so I went to California to try and get in the movies, but instead I became a barmaid."

While in Los Angeles, California, she married soldier Findley Eli Stitson on November 26, 1938, leaving him about five years later because she got "restless". However, in Divine Waters, Massey said that the marriage lasted "about seven years. It was my fault; I left him for another man, so I blame myself for it."

She worked in several odd jobs through the years, and she eventually relocated to Baltimore, Maryland where she worked as a barmaid at Pete's Hotel in the Fell's Point neighborhood. Filmmaker John Waters met Massey while she was working at Pete's Hotel in 1969 and offered her a role as herself in the film Multiple Maniacs. In the early 1970s, she quit her job at Pete's and opened a thrift store called Edith's Shopping Bag, also in Fell's Point.

== Collaboration with John Waters ==
Massey gained a cult following from her appearances in five films directed by John Waters: Multiple Maniacs (1970), in which she appeared as herself and, in a dream sequence, as the Virgin Mary; Pink Flamingos (1972), playing Divine's egg-loving mother, Edie; Female Trouble (1974), as Aunt Ida; Desperate Living (1977), as the evil Queen Carlotta of Mortville; and in her final role in a Waters film, Polyester (1981), as Cuddles Kovinsky.

== Later career and death ==
In the late 1970s and early 1980s, Massey capitalized on the infamy of Waters's films by touring as the lead singer of a punk band, Edie and the Eggs. John Waters described her as an "outsider artist" and "definitely a novelty act.

She also posed for a series of greeting cards. Later, when the Baltimore winters became too much for her to endure, she moved to Venice, California, where she opened another thrift store with the money she earned from acting in Waters's films. In 1980, she was featured in John Mellencamp's music video for "This Time" and also appears on the cover of Mellencamp's album Nothin' Matters and What If It Did.

In 1982, Massey recorded a cover of The Four Seasons' "Big Girls Don't Cry" that was included on the compilation albums The Rhino Brothers Present the World's Worst Records and A Date With John Waters.

The year she died, Massey starred in her final film, Mutants in Paradise. She read for a role in Paul Bartel's Western parody Lust in the Dust (1985) opposite longtime co-star Divine, but actress Nedra Volz was cast instead.

Massey died of complications of lymphoma and diabetes on October 24, 1984, aged 66, in Los Angeles. Her body was cremated, and her ashes were scattered in the Garden of Roses at Westwood Village Memorial Park Cemetery in Los Angeles.

== Legacy ==
Director Robert Maier made a "mockumentary" short about her in 1975 titled Love Letter to Edie. There is a director's authorized version re-mastered from his original 16mm color film footage.

== Filmography ==
Year	Title	Role	Notes
1970	Multiple Maniacs	Edith / Virgin Mary	
1972	Pink Flamingos	Edie	
1974	Female Trouble	Aunt Ida	
1975	Love Letter to Edie	Herself	
1977	Desperate Living	Queen Carlotta	
1981	Polyester	Cuddles Kovinsky	
1983	My Breakfast with Blassie	Herself	Uncredited
1984	Mutants in Paradise	Dr. Durchfall	(final film role)
1985	Divine Waters	Herself	Documentary
2000	In Bad Taste	Herself	Archival footage
2005	Midnight Movies: From the Margin to the Mainstream	Herself	Archival footage
2013	I Am Divine	Herself	Archival footage

== Discography ==
=== Singles ===
List of singles
Title	Year	Album
"Big Girls Don't Cry"	1982	Non-album single
