= Dorothy Braudy =

American painter

Dorothy (McGahee) Braudy is an artist based in Los Angeles. A graduate of the University of Kentucky, she received a M.F.A. from New York University and taught for many years at Pratt Institute, the University of Maryland, and Goucher College. Her work, which includes painting, photography, and printmaking, has been shown in New York, Washington, Baltimore, San Francisco, and Los Angeles, and is included in many private and public collections.

== Background ==
Dorothy Braudy was born in Los Angeles, California and raised in Maysville, Kentucky. She is married to film critic and historian, Leo Braudy. They live and work in Los Angeles, California.

== Career ==
=== Highlights ===
Dorothy Braudy's artwork explores various styles and media with an emphasis on figures and their relation to color and environment.

Her collections '"Signs of Rescue'" (1988) and "Animal Rites" (1994) feature the animal figure and their interactions with not only the human figures in the paintings, but also the engagement of the viewer. In "Animal Rites" shown at Take 2 (a collaborative exhibit between USC's Fisher Gallery and the California African American Museum) visitors peered into the world of zoo animals using a magnifying glass to view their photographs on display.

The human figure and experience is brought to the forefront in "Marking Time" (1995), a biographical snapshot of the artist's life through the recreation of old photographs with oil on canvas paintings. Braudy showed and presented her work on the cross-section between memory and art at Northeastern University's series The Arts of Being: Telling Life Stories Now in 2010.

Dorothy Braudy's photograph series "Sacred L.A" (1995–1997) focuses its lens on the religious aspects of the metropolis that is Los Angeles. The series was featured in the Journal of the American Academy of Religion in 2013.
