= Desperate Living =

1977 film by John Waters

- Theatrical release poster
- Directed by: John Waters
- Written by: John Waters
- Produced by: John Waters
- Starring: Liz Renay; Mink Stole; Susan Lowe; Edith Massey; Mary Vivian Pearce; Jean Hill
- Cinematography: Thomas Loizeaux; John Waters
- Edited by: Charles Roggero
- Music by: Chris Lobingier
- Production company: Dreamland
- Distributed by: New Line Cinema
- Release date: May 27, 1977
- Running time: 90 minutes
- Country: United States
- Language: English
- Budget: $65,000

Desperate Living is a 1977 American independent black comedy film directed, produced, and written by John Waters. The film stars Liz Renay, Mink Stole, Susan Lowe, Edith Massey, Mary Vivian Pearce, and Jean Hill.

It is the third installment of what Waters has labeled the "Trash Trilogy", which also includes Pink Flamingos (1972) and Female Trouble (1974), and the only one without Divine. The film generated a cult following around Renay, who appeared in at least two dozen other films.

Following the murder of her husband, a suburban housewife and her maid agree to be exiled to Mortville, a shantytown ruled by a tyrannical queen regnant.

== Plot ==
Neurotic and delusional Guilford housewife Peggy Gravel and her overweight maid, Grizelda Brown, go on the lam after Grizelda smothers Peggy's husband Bosley to death. A cross-dressing policeman arrests the pair and gives them an ultimatum: go to jail or be exiled to Mortville, a filthy shantytown ruled by the evil Queen Carlotta and her treasonous daughter, Princess Coo-Coo.

Peggy and Grizelda choose Mortville, and engage in lesbian prison sex. They become associates of self-hating lesbian wrestler Mole McHenry, who wants a sex change to please her lover, Muffy St. Jacques. After confiscating a lottery ticket from Peggy, Mole wins the Maryland Lottery and uses the money to obtain gender reassignment surgery at Johns Hopkins Hospital. However, Muffy is repulsed by Mole's phalloplasty and insists he cut it off, so Mole gives himself a penectomy.

Most of Mortville's social outcasts—criminals, nudists, and sexual deviants—conspire to overthrow Queen Carlotta, who banishes Coo-Coo after she elopes with a garbage collector named Herbert, whom Queen Carlotta's guards later shoot to death. Coo-Coo hides in Peggy and Grizelda's house with her dead lover. When Peggy betrays Coo-Coo to the Queen's guards, Grizelda fights them and dies when the house collapses on her. Peggy, however, joins the queen in terrorizing her subjects, even infecting them (and Princess Coo-Coo) with rabies.

Eventually, Mortville's denizens, led by Mole, overthrow Queen Carlotta and execute Peggy by shooting a gun up her anus. To celebrate their freedom, the townsfolk roast Carlotta on a spit and serve her, pig-like, on a platter with an apple in her mouth.

== Cast ==
- Liz Renay as Muffy St. Jacques
- Mink Stole as Peggy Gravel
- Susan Lowe as Mole McHenry
- Edith Massey as Queen Carlotta
- Mary Vivian Pearce as Princess Coo-Coo
- Jean Hill as Grizelda Brown
- Brook Blake as Bosley Gravel Jr.
- Karen Gerwig as Beth Gravel
- Al Strapelli as Dr. Evans
- George Stover as Bosley Gravel
- Turkey Joe as Sheriff Shitface
- Ed Peranio as Lieutenant Williams
- Channing Wilroy as Lieutenant Wilson
- Steve Butow as Lieutenant Grogan
- Paul Swift as Mr. Paul
- George Figgs as Herbert
- Marina Melin as Shina
- Cookie Mueller as Flipper
- Sharon Niesp as Shotsie

== Production ==
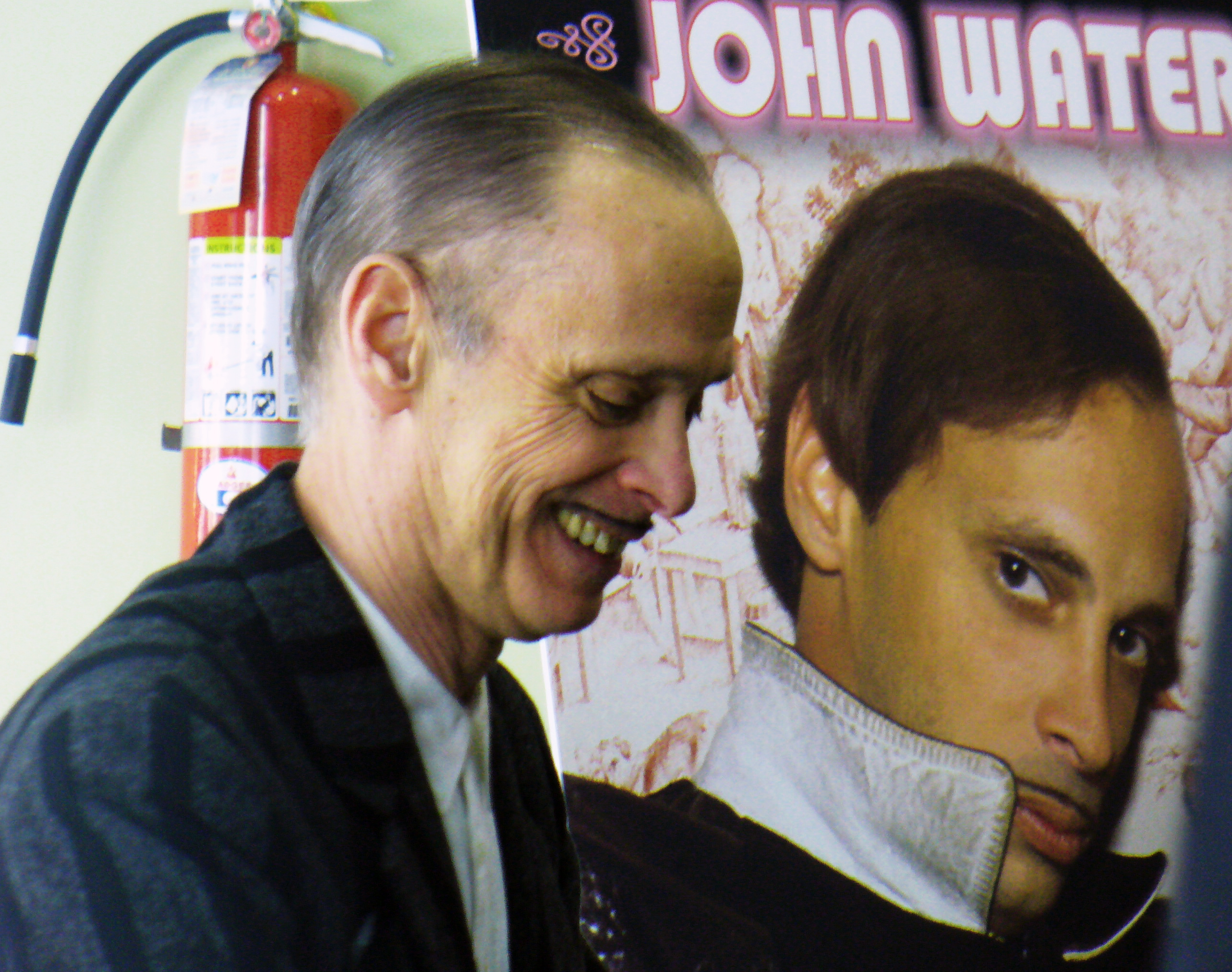
John Waters

Art director Vincent Peranio built the exterior sets for Mortville on a 26-acre farm in Hampstead, Maryland, owned by Waters' friend, Peter Koper. The exterior sets were largely constructed of plywood and rubbish Peranio and Waters had collected from around Baltimore. Production manager Robert Maier recalled the challenges of shooting without adequate facilities, how the cast and crew overwhelmed the farm's septic system, how heavy rains nearly washed away the set, and how "charmed" Waters seemed through it all.

The Mortville interiors were filmed in a 5000-sq-ft, second-story loft in a rented warehouse located in Fells Point, Baltimore. The space was unheated, noisy, and poorly suited for film production according to Maier.

Desperate Living was edited for 10 weeks in the basement of editor Charles Roggero's home. It was Waters' first film with original music, by Chris Lobingier and Allen Yanus, whom Waters asked to provide a "cheesy Doctor Zhivago-type score".

=== Casting ===
Desperate Living is the only feature film Waters made without Divine prior to the actor's death in 1988. Divine had to reluctantly back away from the film because he was committed to appearing in Women Behind Bars. Susan Lowe, who had appeared in small or supporting roles in Waters' previous films, was chosen to take over for the role of Mole McHenry. This was also Waters' first film without David Lochary, because of Lochary's addiction to drugs. Waters said, "The reason that David wasn't in Desperate Living is because of PCP. That's all that's to it. I know that's why he wasn't in the film, and he knows it, too." Lochary died a few weeks after the film's release, when he injured himself while under the influence of the drug.

Waters had received a copy of Liz Renay's autobiography My Face for the World to See and wanted to offer her a role in the film. He went to see Renay in a burlesque show in Boston, then traveled to Los Angeles to offer her the role of Muffy St. Jacques. He offered her only a brief outline of the story, withholding some of the more graphic details for fear that she might refuse the role. Renay accepted the offer and flew to Baltimore for three weeks of shooting (which was, reportedly, all that the production could afford to pay Renay for her services).

== Release ==
As with Waters' previous films, the premiere was held in the auditorium of the University of Baltimore. A brief controversy arose when lesbian groups attacked the film for its depiction of lesbianism, and for taking the title of a defunct lesbian magazine edited by the radical feminist Susan Baker.

New Line Cinema blew the film up from 16 to 35 mm and opened it at midnight in Manhattan, though the original poster (featuring a cooked rat on a plate) was rejected by The New York Times to run, forcing a new poster to be created three days before the opening. The new poster featured Liz Renay in a screaming pose, fashioned from a production still.

Critics from Good Housekeeping walked out of the film after 10 minutes. Otherwise, Playboy enjoyed the film, stating it had to be "seen to be believed". David Chute of The Boston Phoenix said of the film: "In Desperate Living, Waters comes close to creating a work of true trash art."

On the review aggregator website Rotten Tomatoes, the film holds an approval rating of 73% based on 11 reviews, with an average rating of 5.9/10.
