= Leo Braudy =

American academic (born 1941)

Leo Braudy is an American scholar of British literature and mass media. He is University Professor Emeritus in the departments of English and art history at the University of Southern California, and the former holder of the Leo S. Bing Chair in English and American Literature at USC.

== Background ==
Braudy was born in Philadelphia in 1941. After contracting polio at a young age, he took up reading to get through times when he was confined to bed. He received his B.A. from Swarthmore College in 1963 and his M.A. 1963 and Ph.D. 1967 from Yale University. He joined the USC faculty in 1983. He is married to the painter Dorothy Braudy.

Braudy was elected to the American Academy of Arts and Sciences in 2010. He retired from USC, becoming a professor emeritus, in 2024.

== Books ==
Braudy has authored books including:

- Narrative Form in History and Fiction: Hume, Fielding & Gibbon (1970); 2nd ed., The Plot of Time: Narrative Form in Hume, Fielding, and Gibbon (2003)
- Jean Renoir: The World of His Films (1972)
- The World in a Frame: What We See in Films (1977)
- The Frenzy of Renown: Fame and its History (1986)
- Native Informant: Essays on Film, Fiction and Popular Culture (1990)
- From Chivalry to Terrorism: War and the Changing Nature of Masculinity (2003)
- On the Waterfront (2005)
- The Hollywood Sign: Fantasy and Reality of an American Icon (2011)
- Trying to be Cool: Growing Up in the 1950s (2013)
- Haunted: On Ghosts, Witches, Vampires, Zombies, and Other Monsters of the Natural and Supernatural Worlds (2016)

His edited volumes include:

- Norman Mailer: A Collection of Critical Essays (1972)
- Focus on: Shoot the Piano Player (1972)
- Great Film Directors: A Critical Anthology (1978)
