= B movies (exploitation boom) =

1960s–1970s era of genre filmmaking

The 1960s and 1970s marked the rise of exploitation-style independent B movies; films which were mostly made without the support of Hollywood's major film studios. As censorship pressures lifted in the early 1960s, the low-budget end of the American cinema industry increasingly incorporated the sort of sexual and violent elements long associated with so-called "exploitation" films. The demise of the Motion Picture Production Code in 1968 and coupled with the success of the film Easy Rider the following year fueled the trend throughout the subsequent decade. The success of the B-studio exploitation movement had a significant effect on the strategies of the major studios during the 1970s.

== 1960s ==
Despite many transformations in the industry, the average production cost of an American feature film remained mostly stable over the course of the 1950s. In 1950, the figure had been $1 million; in 1961, it reached $2 million—after adjusting for inflation, the increase in real terms was less than 10 percent. The traditional twin bill of B film preceding and balancing a subsequent-run A film had largely disappeared from American theaters. The dual genre-movie package, popularized by American International Pictures (AIP) in the previous decade, was the new face of the double feature. In July 1960, the latest Joseph E. Levine sword-and-sandals import, Hercules Unchained, opened at neighborhood theaters in New York. An 82-minute-long suspense film, Terror Is a Man, ran as a "co-feature", and is notable for including a now-common exploitation gimmick, asking sensitive viewers to close their eyes during the dénouement. That year, Roger Corman took American International down a new road: "When they asked me to make two ten-day black-and-white horror films to play as a double feature, I convinced them instead to finance one horror film in color." A period piece in the vein of Britain's Hammer Films, House of Usher was a success, launching a series of Poe-based movies Corman would direct for AIP.

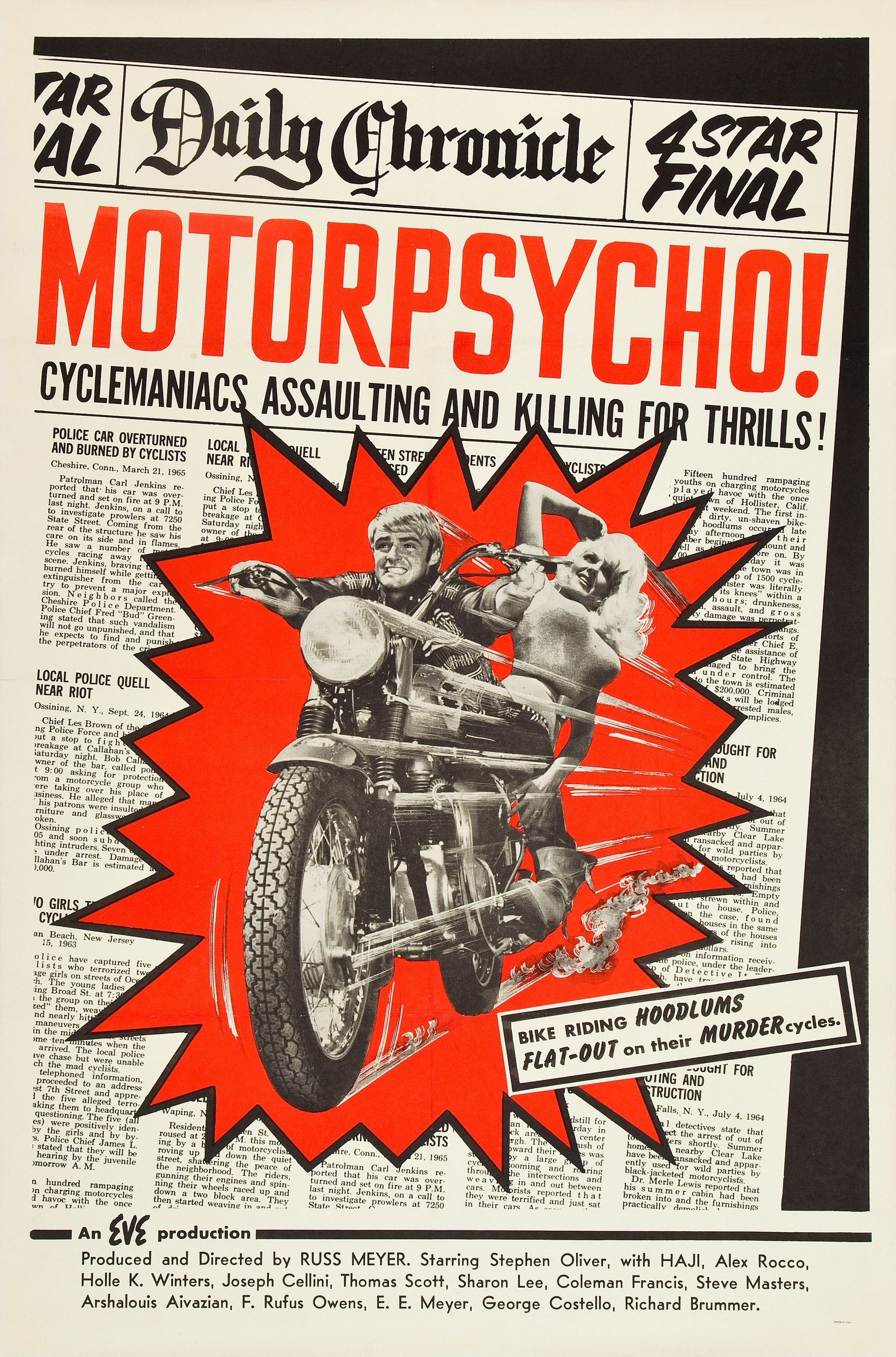
Motorpsycho (1965) exemplifies the shocking nature of many B movies of the time.

With the loosening of industry censorship constraints, the 1960s and 1970s saw a major expansion in the production and commercial viability of a variety of B-movie subgenres that have come to be known collectively as exploitation films. Exploitation-style promotional practices had become standard practice at the lower-budget end of the industry. With major studios having exited traditional B-movie production, exploitation became a way to refer to the entire field of low-budget genre films.

In the early 1960s, exploitation movies in the original sense continued to appear: 1961's Damaged Goods, a cautionary tale about a young lady whose boyfriend's promiscuity leads to venereal disease, comes complete with enormous, grotesque closeups of VD's physical manifestations. At the same time, the concept of fringe exploitation was merging with a closely related and similarly venerable tradition: “nudie" films featuring nudist-camp footage or striptease artists like Bettie Page had simply been the softcore pornography of previous decades. As far back as 1933, This Nude World, which promised an "Authentic Trip Through an American Nudist Colony!", was "Guaranteed the Most Educational Film Ever Produced!" In the late 1950s, as more of the old grindhouse theaters specifically devoted themselves to "adult" product, a few filmmakers began making nudies with some greater semblance of plots. Best known was Russ Meyer, who released his first successful narrative nudie, The Immoral Mr. Teas, in 1959. Five years later, on a sub-$100,000 budget, Meyer came out with Lorna, "a harder-edged film that combined sex with gritty realism and violence." Meyer would build an underground reputation as a talented director with movies such as Faster, Pussycat! Kill! Kill! (1965) and Vixen! (1968), the sort of films, virtually ignored by the mainstream press, that had become known as sexploitation pictures. Many films, while not sexually explicit, were nevertheless relegated to adult theaters due to their sexual content.

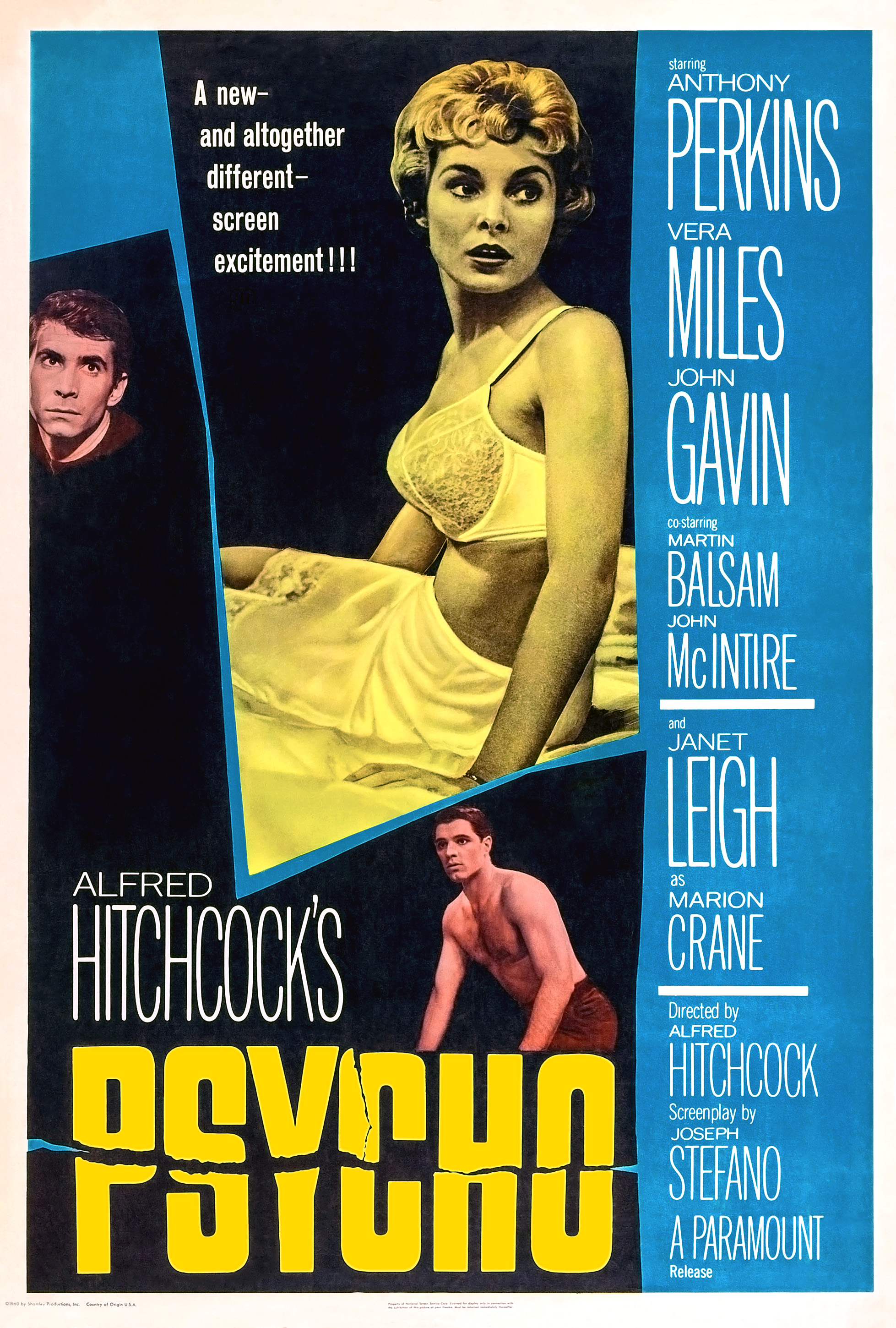
Psycho (1960) marked a move by established director Alfred Hitchcock into horror.

One of the most influential films of the era, on B's and beyond, was Paramount's Psycho. Its $8.5 million in earnings against a production cost of $800,000 made it the most profitable movie of 1960. Its mainstream distribution without the Production Code seal of approval helped weaken U.S. film censorship. And, as William Paul notes, this move into the horror genre by respected director Alfred Hitchcock was made, "significantly, with the lowest-budgeted film of his American career and the least glamorous stars. [Its] greatest initial impact... was on schlock horror movies (notably those from second-tier director William Castle), each of which tried to bill itself as scarier than Psycho." Castle's first film in the Psycho vein was Homicidal (1961), an early step in the development of the slasher subgenre that would flourish in the late 1970s and early 1980s. In order to make up for low budgets, many studios resorted to extreme violence and gore. One of these films, Blood Feast (1963) laid the foundation of the splatter film genre.

Despite Psycho's impact and the growing popularity of horror, major Hollywood studios largely continued to disdain the genre, at least for their own production lines. Along with the output of "off-Hollywood" U.S. concerns similar to Lewis and Friedman's, distributors brought in more foreign movies to fill the demands of rural drive-ins, lower-end urban theaters, and outright grindhouses. Hammer Films' success with The Curse of Frankenstein (1957) and its remake of Dracula (1958) had established the studio as an important supplier of horror movies to the American B market, a positioned it maintained throughout the 1960s. In 1961, American International released a movie clearly influenced by Hammer's characteristically bold visual style and moody pace—Black Sunday was a dubbed horror import from Italy, where it had premiered the previous year as La maschera del demonio. It became the highest grossing film in AIP history. The movie's director was Mario Bava, who would launch the horror subgenre known as giallo with La ragazza che sapeva troppo (The Girl Who Knew Too Much; 1963) and Sei Donne per l’assassino (Blood and Black Lace; 1964). Many gialli, highly stylized films mixing sexploitation and ultraviolence, were picked up for U.S. B-market distribution and would prove influential on American horror films in turn, especially of the slasher type. While in the past, the term B movie had been applied, both in the United States and abroad, almost exclusively to low- and modest-budget American films, the growing Italian exploitation film industry now also became associated with the label (usually styled in Italy as B-movie).

=== Decline of the Code ===
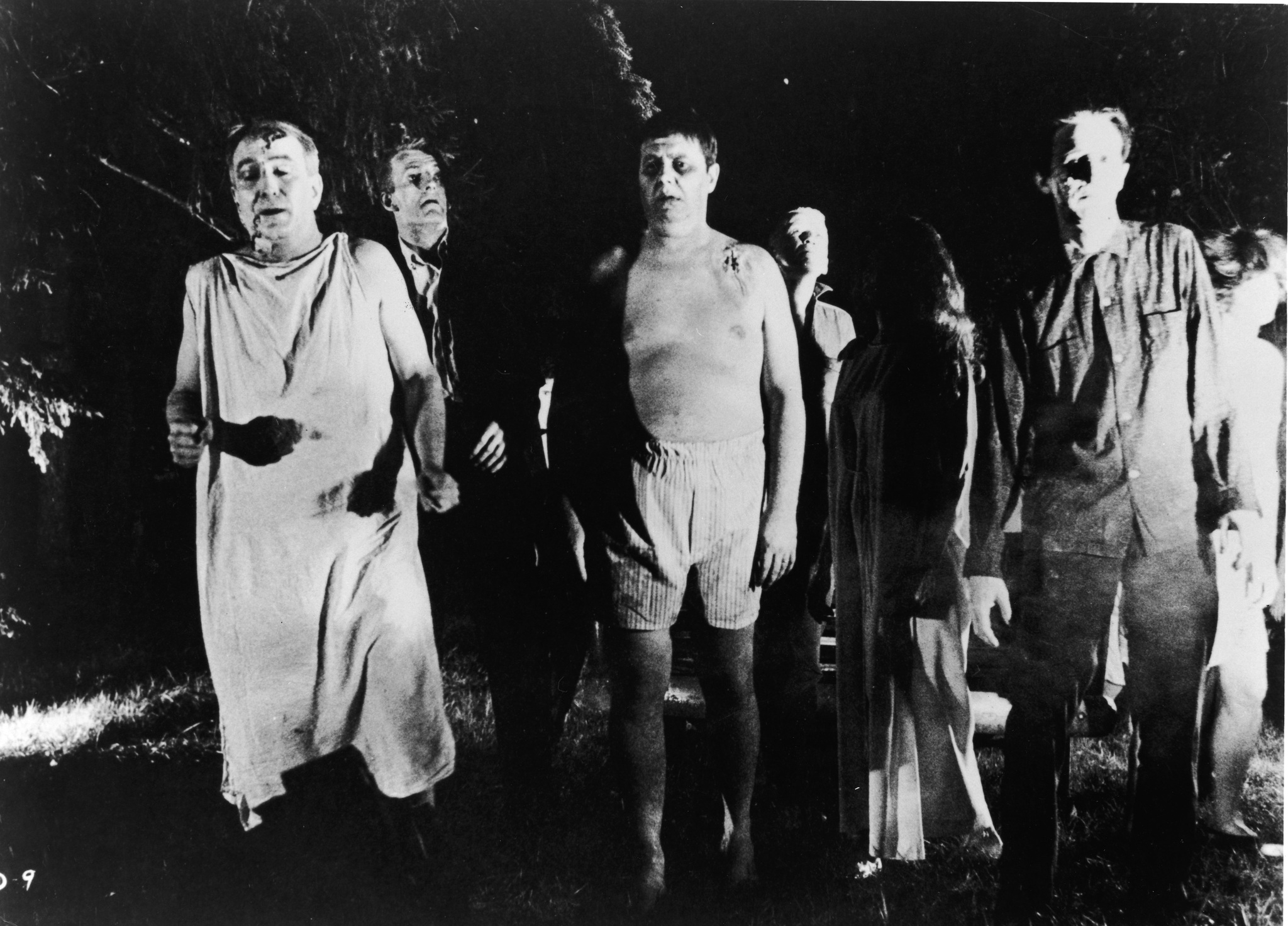
Zombies from Night of the Living Dead (1968)

The Production Code was officially repealed in 1968 and replaced by the first version of the present-day MPA. That same year, two particularly relevant horror films were released. One was a high-budget Paramount production, directed by Roman Polanski and based on a bestselling novel by Ira Levin. Produced by B-horror veteran William Castle, Rosemary's Baby "took the genre up-market for the first time since the 1930s." It was a critical success and the seventh-biggest box office hit of the year. The other was George A. Romero's now classic Night of the Living Dead, produced on weekends in and around Pittsburgh for $114,000. It built on the achievement of B-genre predecessors like Invasion of the Body Snatchers in its subtextual exploration of social and political issues, and was a critical and financial success.

With the Production Code gone and the X rating established, major studio A films like Midnight Cowboy could now show adult imagery, while the market for increasingly hardcore pornography exploded. In this transformed commercial context, work like Russ Meyer's gained a new legitimacy. In 1969, for the first time a Meyer film, Finders Keepers, Lovers Weepers!, was reviewed in The New York Times. Soon, Corman would be putting out nudity-filled sexploitation pictures such as The Student Nurses (1970) and Women in Cages (1971). With The Vampire Lovers (1970), Hammer similarly launched "a cycle of lesbian vampire movies that bordered on soft porn."

In May 1969, the most important of all exploitation movies premiered at the Cannes Film Festival. Much of Easy Rider's significance owes to the fact that it was produced for a respectable, if still modest, budget and released by a major studio. The project was first taken by one of its co-creators, Peter Fonda, to American International. Fonda had become AIP's top star in the Corman–directed The Wild Angels (1966), a biker movie, and The Trip, as in LSD. The idea Fonda pitched would combine those two proven themes. AIP was intrigued but balked at giving his collaborator, Dennis Hopper—who had appeared in The Trip and several other AIP opuses—free directorial rein. The duo then took their concept, for which they had projected a $60,000 budget, to producer Bert Schneider. Suggesting that they would have an easier time raising $600,000, Schneider helped arrange a financing and distribution deal with Columbia Pictures, where his brother was president. Two more graduates of the Corman/AIP exploitation mill joined the project: Jack Nicholson and cinematographer László Kovács. The film (which managed to incorporate another favorite exploitation theme, the redneck menace, as well as a fair amount of nudity) was brought in at a cost of $501,000. Easy Rider would earn $19.1 million in rentals, becoming, as one history puts it, "the seminal film that provided the bridge between all the repressed tendencies represented by schlock/kitsch/hack since the dawn of Hollywood and the mainstream cinema of the seventies."

== 1970s ==
In the late 1960s and early 1970s, a new generation of low-budget film companies emerged that drew from all the different lines of exploitation as well as the sci-fi and teen themes that had been a mainstay since the 1950s. Operations such as Roger Corman's New World Pictures, Cannon Films, New Line Cinema, Film Ventures International, Fanfare Films, and Independent-International Pictures brought exploitation films to mainstream theaters around the country. The major studios' top product was continuing to inflate in running time—in 1970, the ten biggest earners averaged 140.1 minutes. The B's were keeping pace: In 1955, Corman had a produced five movies averaging 74.8 minutes, with a range between 69 and 79. He played a similar part in five films originally released in 1970, two for AIP and three for his own New World, including an Italian horror film that he purchased for around $25,000: the average length was 89.8 minutes, with a range between 86 and 94. These films could turn a tidy profit. The first New World release, the biker movie Angels Die Hard, cost $117,000 to produce. It was no Easy Rider, but its box-office take of $2 million–plus meant a 46 percent return for New World's investors.

In addition to the start-ups, the growth of exploitation in the 1970s also involved the leading studio in the low-budget field. In 1973, American International gave a shot to director Brian De Palma, whose previous movie, a Warner Bros. comedy, performed poorly. Reviewing Sisters, De Palma's first horror film, New Yorker critic Pauline Kael observed that its "limp technique doesn't seem to matter to the people who want their gratuitous gore. The movie supplies it, but why is there so much gratuitous dumbness too?... [H]e can't get two people talking in order to make a simple expository point without its sounding like the drabbest Republic picture of 1938." Many examples of the so-called blaxploitation genre of the early and middle part of the decade, featuring stereotype-filled stories revolving around drugs, violent crime, and prostitution, were the product of AIP. One of blaxploitation's biggest stars was Pam Grier, who began her film career with a bit part in Russ Meyer's Beyond the Valley of the Dolls (1970) and who had appeared in several New World pictures, including The Big Doll House (1971) and The Big Bird Cage (1972), both directed by Jack Hill. Hill also directed her best-known performances, in two AIP blaxploitation films: Coffy (1973) and Foxy Brown (1974).

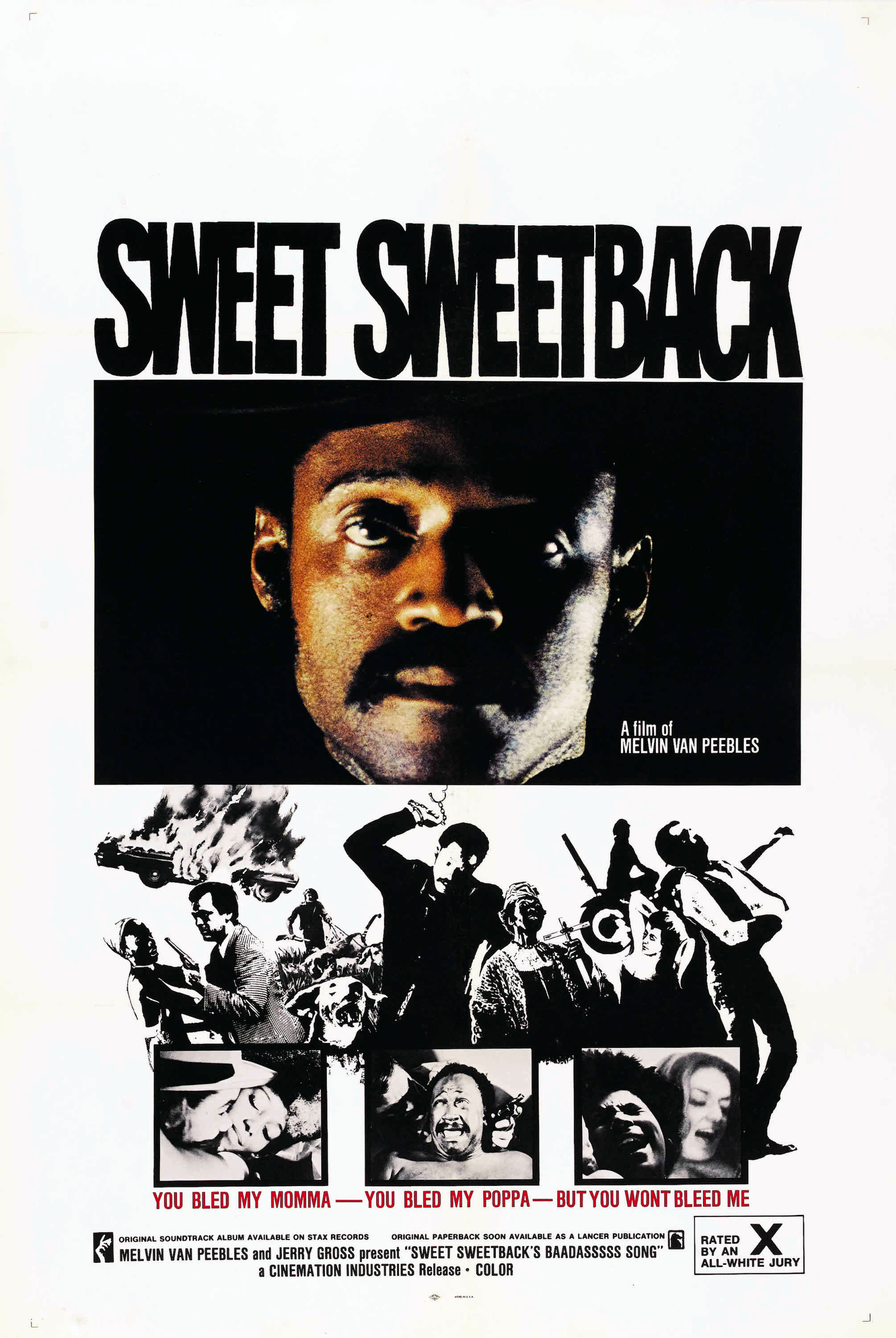
Sweet Sweetback's Baadasssss Song (1971), directed by Melvin Van Peebles

Blaxploitation was the first exploitation genre to picked up by the major studios in a substantial way. Indeed, the United Artists release Cotton Comes to Harlem (1970), directed by Ossie Davis, is seen as the first significant film of the type. Crossing over before the genre had even gotten established, Laurence Merrick's micro-budget independent The Black Angels (a.k.a. Black Bikers from Hell; 1970) followed by a few months. But the movie regarded as truly igniting the blaxploitation phenomenon, again completely independent, came the following year: Sweet Sweetback's Baadasssss Song. Melvin Van Peebles wrote, co-produced, directed, starred in, edited, and composed the music for the film, which was completed with the last-minute help of a $50,000 loan from Bill Cosby.

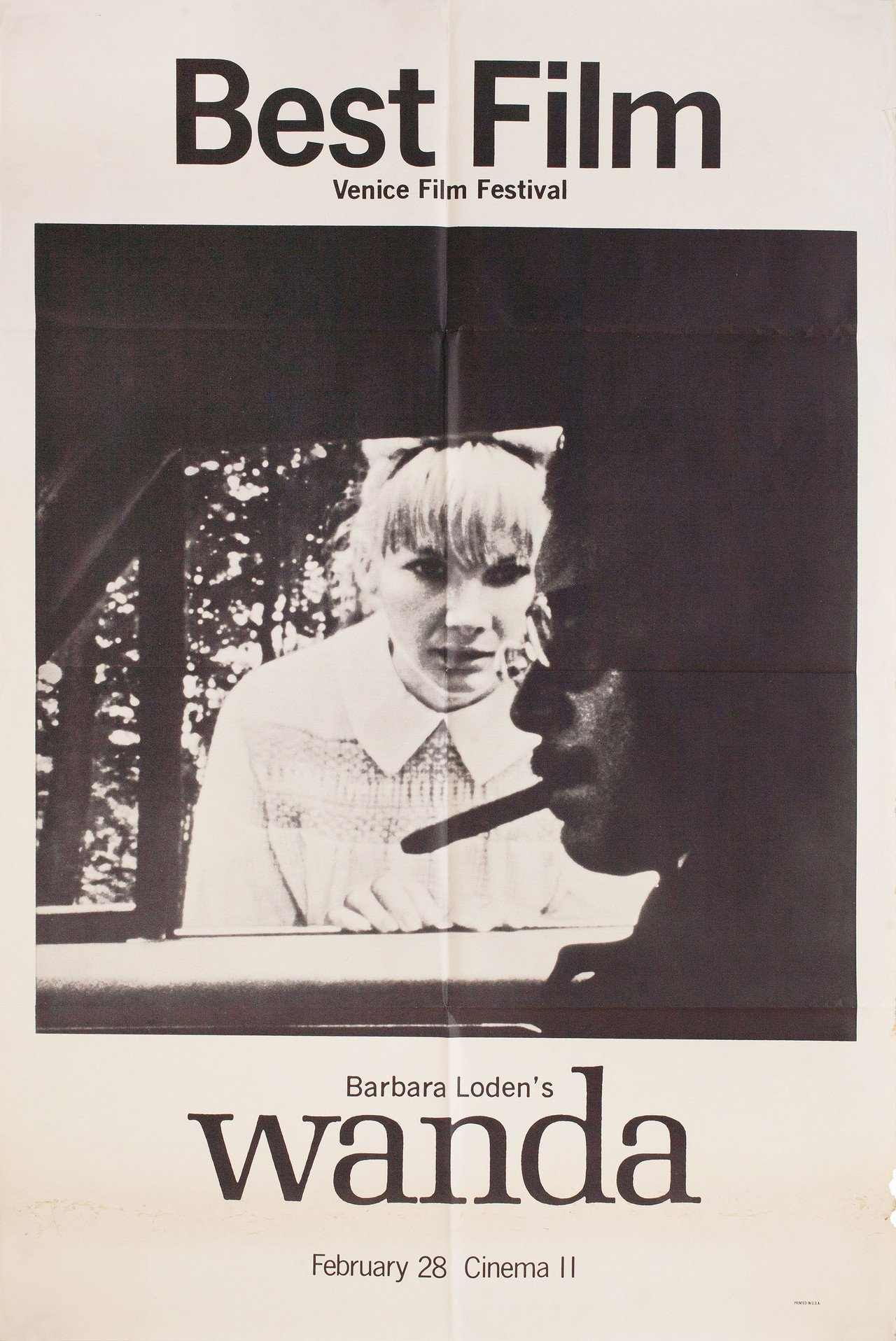
Wanda (1970), directed by Barbara Loden

In 1970, a low-budget crime drama shot in 16 mm by a first-time American director won the international critics' prize at the Venice Film Festival. Wanda, written and directed by Barbara Loden, is both a seminal event in the independent film movement and a classic B picture. The plot—involving a disaffected divorcée who drifts away from her coal-town life and aimlessly falls in with a small-time, would-be hardboiled crook, resembling the setting of an old noir film. Loden, who spent six years raising money for the sub-$200,000 production, created a film that Vincent Canby of The New York Times praised for "the absolute accuracy of its effects, the decency of its point of view and the kind of purity of technique that can only be the result of conscious discipline." While Wanda would be the only movie Loden ever made, she "left us with a film that anticipated the independent spirit that would reinvigorate the industry."

Like Romero and Van Peebles, other filmmakers of the era made pictures that combined the gut-level entertainment of exploitation with biting social commentary. The first three features directed by Larry Cohen, Bone (a.k.a. Beverly Hills Nightmare; 1972), Black Caesar (1973), and Hell Up in Harlem (1973), were all nominally blaxploitation movies, but Cohen—also the screenwriter on each film—used them as vehicles for a satirical examination of race relations and the wages of dog-eat-dog capitalism. Cohen's The Private Files of J. Edgar Hoover (1977), for AIP, might have "the look of tabloid sleaze," but one leading critic found it "perhaps the most intelligent film about American politics ever to come out of Hollywood." The gory horror film Deathdream (a.k.a. Dead of Night; 1974), directed by Bob Clark and written by Alan Orsmby, is also a protest of the Vietnam War. Canadian filmmaker David Cronenberg made many low-budget horror films which, while not ideological, still take a deep focus on existential and psychological problems, such as Shivers (1975), Rabid (1977), and The Brood (1979)

The horror field continued to attract young, independent American directors whose work would prove especially influential. As critic Roger Ebert explained in one 1974 movie review, "Horror and exploitation films almost always turn a profit if they're brought in at the right price. So they provide a good starting place for ambitious would-be filmmakers who can't get more conventional projects off the ground." The particular movie under consideration was The Texas Chain Saw Massacre. Written and directed by Tobe Hooper, it was made on a budget of somewhere between $93,000 and $250,000. It would earn $14.4 million in domestic rentals and become one of the most influential horror films of the decade. John Carpenter, whose debut feature, the $60,000 Science fiction comedy Dark Star (1974) became a cult classic. Halloween (1978), produced for $320,000, grossed over $80 million at the box-office worldwide, making it "the most successful 'indie' movie ever released." The film effectively established the slasher mode as the primary expression of the horror genre for the next decade. Just as Hooper had learned from Romero's landmark Night of the Living Dead, Halloween, in turn, largely followed the model of Black Christmas, directed by Deathdream's Bob Clark.

The impact of these films still echoes through such movies as the Saw series, including 2006's Saw III, a mainstream, $10 million production—far below the current Hollywood average, but more than a hundred times Hooper's budget and well out of any true independent's league. In various ways, the B movies of the era have inspired later filmmakers blessed with much better financial backing. Almost all the works of Quentin Tarantino—in particular, Jackie Brown (1997), the Kill Bill movies (2003–04), and his Death Proof segment of Grindhouse (2007)—pay explicit tribute to classic exploitation cinema. Blaxploitation is a direct homage by the former, while the Kill Bill pictures reference a wide variety of Asian martial arts films, which appeared as imports in U.S. theaters regularly during the 1970s. These "kung fu" films as they were often called, whatever specific martial art was featured, were popularized in the United States by the Hong Kong–produced movies of Bruce Lee. His films, and later ones with such stars as Hong Kong's Jackie Chan and Japan's Sonny Chiba, were marketed to the same genre/exploitation audience targeted by AIP and New World. Death Proof is inspired by a range of exploitation styles, particularly giallo/slasher pictures and car-chase movies like 20th Century-Fox's Vanishing Point (1971) and Dirty Mary, Crazy Larry (1974) and New World's Cannonball (1976) and Grand Theft Auto (1977).

=== New markets for the B ===
In the early 1970s, the growing practice of screening non-mainstream motion pictures as late shows, with the goal of building a cult film audience, made the midnight movie a significant new mode of cinematic exhibition, with transgressive connotations. Socializing in a countercultural milieu was part of the original attraction of the midnight filmgoing experience, something like a drive-in movie for the hip. One of the first films adopted by the new midnight movie circuit in 1971 was the three-year-old Night of the Living Dead. The midnight movie success of low-budget pictures made entirely outside of the studio system, like John Waters' Pink Flamingos (1972), with its campy spin on exploitation, spurred the development of the independent film movement. The Rocky Horror Picture Show (1975), an inexpensive film from 20th Century-Fox that spoofed all manner of classic B-picture clichés, became an unparalleled hit when it was relaunched as a late show feature the year after its initial, unprofitable release. Even as Rocky Horror generated its own subcultural phenomenon, it contributed to the mainstreaming of the theatrical midnight movie.

On television, the parallels between the weekly series that became the mainstay of prime-time programming and the Hollywood series films of an earlier day had long been clear. In the 1970s, original feature-length programming increasingly began to echo the B movie as well. While there had been dramatic feature presentations made especially for TV since the beginning of the medium's mass commercialization in the late 1940s, they had by and large not crossed over with the realm of the B movie. In the 1950s, the live television drama—a unique amalgam of cinematic and theatrical elements exemplified by Playhouse 90 (1956–1961)—had predominated. Over the course of the 1960s, there was a transition to prerecorded features; most of those produced by the major networks either aspired to the prestige of major motion pictures (e.g., CBS's 1965 Cinderella) or were intended as pilots for projected series. During this period, AIP produced a number of low-grade genre pictures such as Zontar, the Thing from Venus (1966) intended for the first-run TV syndication market.

As production of TV movies expanded with the introduction of the ABC Movie of the Week in 1969, soon followed by the dedication of other network slots to original feature presentations, time and financial factors shifted the medium progressively into B-picture territory. In a 1974 Time article, "The New B Movies," Richard Schickel begins by discussing a few recent high-priced TV features, only to argue that

"as with the old films, so with TV movies: the quick, deft westerns, mysteries and action melodramas that depend on well-established conventions may in the end exert a larger claim on our attention than their more pretentiously publicized rivals...Convenient to turn on, easy to flick off, movies made for TV approximate the conditions under which all movies used to be chanced by audiences years ago...when at least half the pleasure of movie-going derived precisely from the fact that no sense of cultural occasion was attached to that simple, inexpensive act."

While many TV films of the 1970s were action-oriented genre pictures of a type familiar from contemporary cinematic B production, the small screen also saw a revival of the B melodrama. Television films inspired by recent scandals—such as ABC's The Ordeal of Patty Hearst, which premiered a month after her release from prison in 1979—harkened all the way back to the 1920s and such movies as Human Wreckage and When Love Grows Cold, pictures from low-budget studio FBO made swiftly in the wake of celebrity misfortunes. Some TV movies, such as Nightmare in Badham County (ABC; 1976), headed straight into the realm of road-tripping-girls-in-redneck-bondage exploitation.

The reverberations of Easy Rider could be felt in Nightmare in Badham County, as well as in a host of big-screen exploitation films of the era. But perhaps its greatest influence on the fate of the B movie was less direct. By 1973, the major studios were clearly catching on to the commercial potential of genres that had once been consigned to the bargain basement. Rosemary's Baby had shown that a well-packaged horror "special" could be a box-office hit, but it had little in common with the exploitation style. Warner Bros.' The Exorcist, directed by William Friedkin, was a different story. It showed that a heavily promoted and distributed film in the genre could be an absolute blockbuster. And more: In William Paul's description, "it is the film that really established gross-out as a mode of expression for mainstream cinema.... Past exploitation films managed to exploit their cruelties by virtue of their marginality. The Exorcist made cruelty respectable. By the end of the decade, the exploitation booking strategy of opening films simultaneously in hundreds to thousands of theaters became standard industry practice." It was the biggest movie of the year and by far the highest-earning horror movie yet made. On behalf of its genre, Universal's American Graffiti did something similar. Released when writer-director George Lucas was twenty-nine years old, it is described by Paul as "essentially an American-International teenybopper pic with a lot more spit and polish"—a combination that made it the third biggest movie of 1973 and, likewise, by far the highest-earning teen-themed movie yet made. A-budgeted B-themed movies of even greater historical import would follow in their wake.
