= List of LGBTQ-related films of 1972 =

This is a list of lesbian, gay, bisexual, transgender or queer-related films released in 1972. It contains theatrically released films that deal with important gay, lesbian, bisexual, transgender or queer characters or issues and may have same-sex romance or relationships as a plot device.

== Films ==
Title	Director	Country	Genre	Cast	Notes
Amuck!	Silvio Amadio	Italy	Thriller	Barbara Bouchet, Farley Granger, Rosalba Neri, Umberto Raho and Patrizia Viotti	a.k.a. Alla ricerca del piacere
The Beguines	Guy Casaril	France	Drama	Anicée Alvina, Nicole Courcel, Venantino Venantini, Jean Martin, Ginette Leclerc and Harry-Max	a.k.a. Le Rempart des béguines
The Bitter Tears of Petra von Kant	Rainer Werner Fassbinder	West Germany	Drama	Margit Carstensen, Irm Hermann, Hanna Schygulla, Gisela Fackeldey, Eva Mattes and Katrin Schaake	a.k.a. Die bitteren Tränen der Petra von Kant; based on Fassbinder's play of the same name
The Blood Spattered Bride	Vicente Aranda	Spain	Horror	Simón Andreu, Maribel Martín, Alexandra Bastedo	a.k.a. La novia ensangrentada, Till Death Do Us Part; based on the novel Carmilla by Sheridan Le Fanu
Cabaret	Bob Fosse	United States	Musical, drama	Liza Minnelli, Michael York, Helmut Griem, Joel Grey, Fritz Wepper, Marisa Berenson, Elisabeth Neumann-Viertel, Helen Vita, Sigrid von Richthofen, Gerd Vespermann, Ralf Wolter, Georg Hartmann, Ricky Renee and Oliver Collignon	
The Canterbury Tales	Pier Paolo Passolini	Italy	Comedy, drama	Hugh Griffith, Laura Betti, Ninetto Davoli, Franco Citti, Josephine Chaplin, Alan Webb, Jenny Runacre, John Francis Lane, Tom Baker, Robin Askwith, Michael Balfour, Vernon Dobtcheff, Derek Deadman, Adrian Street, Nicholas Smith, Willoughby Goddard and Peter Stephens	a.k.a. I racconti di Canterbury, based on the stories of the same name by Geoffrey Chaucer
The Case of the Bloody Iris	Anthony Ascott	Italy	Thriller	Edwige Fenech, George Hilton, Paola Quattrini, Annabella Incontrera, George Rigaud and Giampiero Albertini	a.k.a. Perché quelle strane gocce di sangue sul corpo di Jennifer?
Daughter of Dracula	Jesus Franco	Spain, France, Portugal	Horror	Britt Nichols, Anne Libert, Alberto Dalbés, Howard Vernon and Daniel White	a.k.a. La hija de Drácula, La fille de Dracula
The Death of Maria Malibran	Werner Schroeter	West Germany	Experimental, drama	Magdalena Montezuma, Christine Kaufmann, Candy Darling, Manuela Riva, Ingrid Caven	a.k.a. Der Tod der Maria Malibran; fictional, experimental film influenced by the life of opera singer Maria Malibran
Deliverance	John Boorman	United States	Adventure, drama, thriller	Jon Voight, Burt Reynolds, Ned Beatty, Ronny Cox, Ed Ramey, Billy Redden, Bill McKinney, Herbert 'Cowboy' Coward, James Dickey, Macon McCalman, Belinda Beatty and Charley Boorman	Screenplay by James Dickey, based on his novel of the same name
Georgia, Georgia	Stig Björkman	Sweden, United States	Drama	Diana Sands, Dirk Benedict, Minnie Gentry, Terry Whitmore, Diana Kjær, Lars-Erik Berenett, Stig Engström, James Thomas Finley Jr. and Roger Furman	Screenplay by Maya Angelou, considered the first theatrically-released film to have been written by a Black woman
Heat	Paul Morrissey	United States	Drama	Joe Dallesandro, Sylvia Miles, Andrea Feldman, Pat Ast, Ray Vestal, Lester Persky, Eric Emerson, Gary Kaznocha, Harold Stevenson, John Hallowell, Pat Parlemon and Bonnie Walder	
Her Third	Egon Günther	East Germany	Romance, drama	Jutta Hoffmann, Barbara Dittus, Rolf Ludwig, Peter Köhncke and Armin Mueller-Stahl	Based on the short story Unter den Bäumen regnet es zweimal by Eberhard Panitz
I Want What I Want	John Dexter	United Kingdom	Drama	Anne Heywood, Harry Andrews and Jill Bennett	Based on the novel of the same name by Geoff Brown
Intimate Confessions of a Chinese Courtesan	Chor Yuen	Hong Kong	Action, drama	Lily Ho, Betty Pei Ti and Yueh Hua	a.k.a. Ai Nu
My Dearest Senorita	Jaime de Armiñán	Spain	Romance, drama	José Luis López Vázquez, Julieta Serrano, Antonio Ferrandis, Enrique Ávila, Lola Gaos, Chus Lampreave, Mónica Randall and José Luis Borau	a.k.a. Mi querida señorita
Os Machões	Reginaldo Faria	Brazil	Comedy	Erasmo Carlos, Reginaldo Faria, Flávio Migliaccio, Mário Benvenutti and Neuza Amaral	
Pete 'n' Tillie	Martin Ritt	United States	Comedy, drama	Walter Matthau, Carol Burnett	Adapted from the novella Witch's Mlik by Peter De Vries
Pink Flamingos	John Waters	United States	Comedy, crime	John Waters, David Lochary, Mink Stole, Mary Vivian Pearce, Danny Mills, Edith Massey, Cookie Mueller, Channing Wilroy, Paul Swift, Susan Walsh, Linda Olgierson, Pat Moran, Steve Yeager, George Figgs and Elizabeth Coffey	
Play It as It Lays	Frank Perry	United States	Drama	Tuesday Weld, Anthony Perkins, Tammy Grimes, Adam Roarke, Ruth Ford, Eddie Firestone, Diana Ewing and Paul Lambert	Based on the novel of the same name by Joan Didion
The Pollen of Flowers	Ha Gil-jong	South Korea	Drama	Choi Ji-hee, Namkoong Won and Hah Myung-joong	a.k.a. Hwabun, based on the novel of the same name by Yi Hyoseok
Scarecrow in a Garden of Cucumbers	Robert J. Kaplan	United States	Musical drama	Holly Woodlawn	
The Sensuous Three	Robert van Ackeren	West Germany	Drama, comedy	Mascha Rabben, Gabriele Lafari, Ulli Lommel, Rolf Zacher and Heidy Bohlen	a.k.a. Harlis
Sins of Rachel	Dick Fontaine	United States	Mystery, drama	Ann Noble, Jerome Scott, Brett Mariott and Bruce Campbell	
That Certain Summer	Lamont Johnson	United States	Drama	Hal Holbrook, Martin Sheen	TV movie that was recognized as being the first network drama to depict a stable, same-gender couple
Tombs of the Blind Dead	Amando de Ossorio	Spain	Horror	Lone Fleming, César Burner, María Elena Arpón, José Thelman and Rufino Inglés	a.k.a. La noche del terror ciego
Vanessa	René Cardona Jr.	Mexico	Drama	Laila Novak, Arthur Hansel, Jacqueline Voltaire, Carmen Serral, Hedi Blue and Maria Bardahl	
Zee and Co.	Brian G. Hutton	United Kingdom	Drama	Elizabeth Taylor, Michael Caine, Susannah York, Margaret Leighton, John Standing, Mary Larkin and Michael Cashman	Screenplay by Edna O'Brien, who later adapted it into a novel; a.k.a. X Y and Zee, Zee and Company
