= Günter Kunert =

German writer (1929–2019)

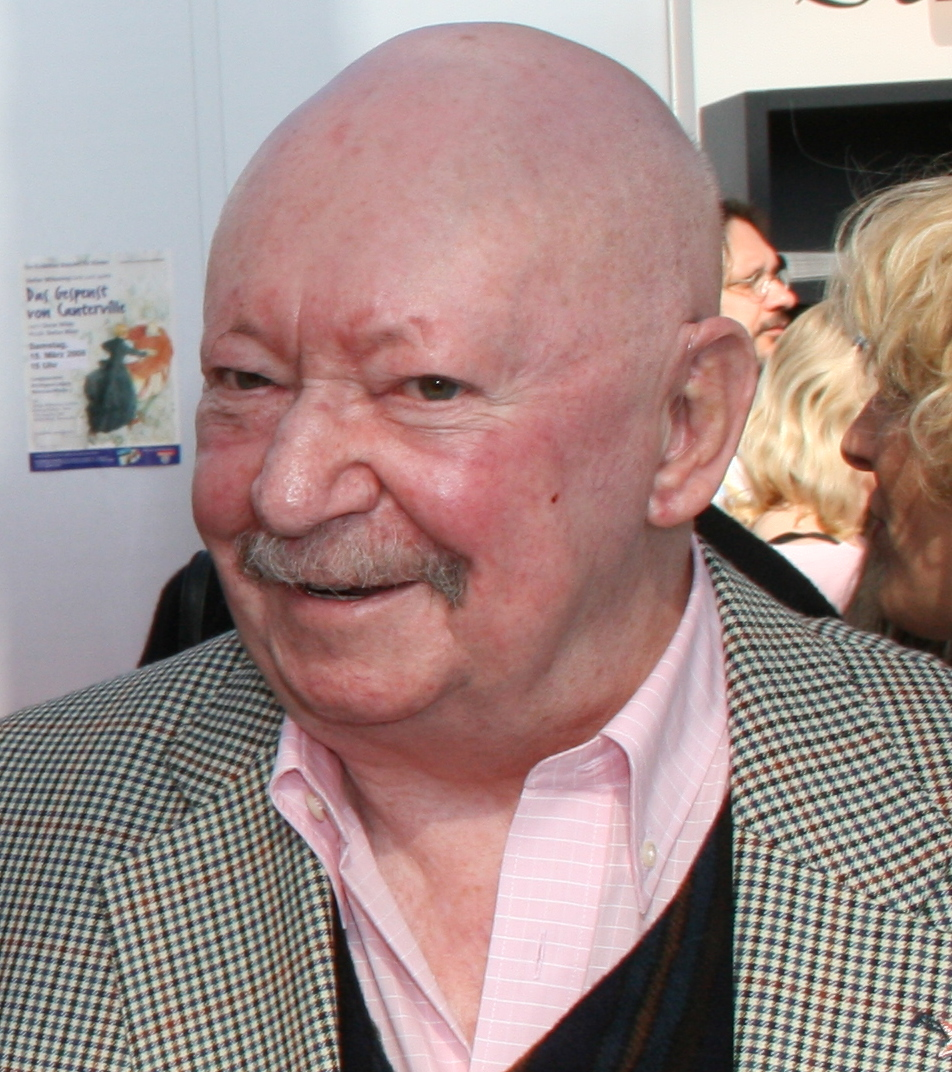
- Kunert in 2008
- Born: 6 March 1929; Berlin
- Died: 21 September 2019 (aged 90); Kaisborstel, Germany
- Occupations: Writer; Poet; Graphic artist
- Organization: P.E.N. Club
- Awards: Heinrich Heine Prize; Order of Merit of the Federal Republic of Germany

Günter Kunert (German: [ˈɡʏn.tɐ ˈkʊ.nɐt]; 6 March 1929 – 21 September 2019) was a German writer. Based in East Berlin, he published poetry from 1947, supported by Bertolt Brecht. After he had signed a petition against the deprivation of the citizenship of Wolf Biermann in 1976, he lost his SED membership, and moved to the West two years later. He is regarded as a versatile German writer who wrote short stories, essays, autobiographical works, film scripts and novels. He received international honorary doctorates and awards.

== Life ==
Kunert was born in Berlin. After attending a Volksschule, it was not possible for Kunert—due to the National Socialist race laws—to continue his high school education because his mother was Jewish. After World War II, Kunert studied graphics at East Berlin's Academy of Applied Arts from 1946–49, but then abandoned his studies. His first poem appeared in 1947. Supported by Bertold Brecht, he published in the satirical paper Ulenspiegel. In 1950, his first poetry collection appeared.

He joined the main political party of East Germany, the Socialist Unity Party (SED) in 1949. In 1976, he signed a petition against the deprivation of the citizenship of his fellow writer, Wolf Biermann, and subsequently lost his SED membership. Kunert was able to leave the GDR in 1979 with a visa. He, his wife Marianne, and their granddaughter, Judith, established themselves in near Itzehoe in northern Germany.

Kunert was regarded as one of the most versatile and important contemporary German writers. Besides lyric poetry, he also wrote short stories, essays, autobiographical works, aphorisms, satires, fairy tales, science fiction, radio plays, speeches, travel writing, film scripts, a novel, and a drama. Kunert was also a painter and a graphic artist. He published in numerous literary magazines, such as Muschelhaufen.

In his works, he took a critical attitude towards Nazism, and the belief in progress. Kunert was a primary opponent of the German spelling reform of 1996, and served as a member in the Association for German Orthography and Language Care. He was also active in the P.E.N. Club of German-language authors.

Kunert died in Kaisborstel on 21 September 2019 at the age of 90. He is buried in Berlin at Weißensee cemetery.

== Awards ==
Kunert was an honorary doctor of several universities in Italy and the United States. He was awarded the Heinrich Heine Prize of Düsseldorf in 1985, the Order of Merit of the Federal Republic of Germany in 2012 and the Kunstpreis of Schleswig-Holstein in 2014.

== Works ==
=== Books ===
Books by Kunert are held by the German National Library.

- Wegschilder und Mauerinschriften. poems. Aufbau-Verlag, East Berlin 1950.
- Der ewige Detektiv und andere Geschichten. stories. Eulenspiegel Verlag, East Berlin 1954.
- Jäger ohne Beute. story. Verlag Neues Leben, East Berlin 1955.
- Unter diesem Himmel. poems. Aufbau-Verlag 1955.
- Der Kaiser von Hondu. television play. Aufbau-Verlag 1959.
- Tagwerke. Gedichte – Lieder – Balladen. poems / prose. Mitteldeutscher Verlag, Halle 1961.
- Das kreuzbrave Liederbuch. poems. Aufbau-Verlag 1961.
- Erinnerung an einen Planeten. Gedichte aus fünfzehn Jahren. Carl Hanser Verlag, Munich 1963.
- Tagträume. Carl Hanser Verlag 1964.
- Kunerts lästerliche Leinwand. Eulenspiegel, East Berlin.1965.
- Der ungebetene Gast. poems. Aufbau-Verlag 1965.
- Unschuld der Natur. 52 Figurationen leibhafter Liebe. poems. Aufbau-Verlag 1966.
- Verkündigung des Wetters. poems. Carl Hanser Verlag 1966.
- Im Namen der Hüte. novel. Carl Hanser Verlag 1967.
- Die Beerdigung findet in aller Stille statt. stories. Carl Hanser Verlag 1968.
- Kramen in Fächern. Geschichten – Parabeln – Merkmale. Aufbau-Verlag 1968.
- Poesiealbum 8. Verlag Neues Leben, Berlin 1968; neueingerichtete Auflage, Märkischer Verlag, Wilhelmshorst 2012
- Betonformen – Ortsangaben. Essays. Verlag Literarisches Colloquium, Berlin 1969.
- Notizen in Kreide. poems. Verlag Philipp Reclam Jun, Leipzig 1970.
- Warnung vor Spiegeln. poems. Carl Hanser Verlag 1970.
- Ortsangaben. Kurzprosa. Aufbau-Verlag 1970.
- Alltägliche Geschichte einer Berliner Straße. Aufgeschrieben und gezeichnet von Günter Kunert. illustrated story. Carl Hanser Verlag 1970.
- Tagträume in Berlin und andernorts. Carl Hanser Verlag 1972.
- Offener Ausgang. Gedichte. Aufbau-Verlag 1972.
- Die geheime Bibliothek. Aufbau-Verlag 1973.
- Gast aus England: story. Carl Hanser Verlag 1973.
- Der andere Planet. Ansichten von Amerika. Aufbau-Verlag 1974.
- Im weiteren Fortgang. poems. Carl Hanser Verlag 1974.
- Das kleine Aber. poems. Aufbau-Verlag 1975.
- Notizen in Kreide. poems. Reclam Verlag 1975.
- Der andere Planet. Ansichten von Amerika. Lizenzausgabe des Aufbau-Verlags Berlin/Weimar, Carl Hanser Verlag 1975.
- Der Mittelpunkt der Erde. Kurzprosa. Mit Zeichnungen des Autors. Eulenspiegel Verlag 1975.
- Jeder Wunsch ein Treffer. Kinderbuch. Ill. von Günter Edelmann. Gertraud Middelhauve Verlag, Velber bei Hannover 1976.
- Kinobesuch. Geschichten. Kurzprosa. Insel-Bücherei 1007/1. Insel-Verlag Anton Kippenberg, Leipzig 1976.
- Keine Affäre. Geschichten. Berliner Handpresse, Berlin 1976.
- Warum schreiben. Notizen zur Literatur. Essays. Carl Hanser Verlag, München 1976 / Aufbau-Verlag 1976.
- Berliner Wände. Bilder aus einer verschwundenen Stadt. Essay. With photographs by Thomas Hoepker. Carl Hanser Verlag 1976.
- Im Namen der Hüte. novel, Illustrationen von Jürgen Schäfer. Eulenspiegel Verlag 1976.
- Unterwegs nach Utopia. poems. Carl Hanser Verlag 1977.
- Ein anderer K. Hörspiele. Aufbau-Verlag, Berlin/Weimar 1977.
- Bucher Nachträge. Prosa. Berliner Handpresse, Berlin 1978.
- Camera obscura. Kurzprosa. Carl Hanser Verlag, München 1978
- Verlangen nach Bomarzo. Reisegedichte. Mit Zeichnungen des Autors. Carl Hanser Verlag 1978 / Reclam Verlag, Leipzig 1978.
- Ein englisches Tagebuch. Reisetagebuch. Aufbau-Verlag 1978.
- Heinrich von Kleist – Ein Modell. Essay. Akademie der Künste, Berlin 1978.
- Drei Berliner Geschichten. Mit Zeichnungen des Autors. Aufbau-Verlag 1979.
- Die Schreie der Fledermäuse. Geschichten – Gedichte – Aufsätze. Carl Hanser Verlag 1979.
- Unruhiger Schlaf. Gedichte. Deutscher Taschenbuch Verlag, München 1979.
- Ziellose Umtriebe. Nachrichten vom Reisen und vom Daheimsein. Kurzprosa. Aufbau-Verlag 1979.
- Acht bunte Blätter. Reproduktionen von Ölgemälden des Autors. Eulenspiegel Verlag, Berlin (DDR) 1979.
- Abtötungsverfahren. Gedichte. Carl Hanser Verlag 1980.
- Unterwegs nach Utopia. Gedichte. Aufbau-Verlag, Berlin/Weimar 1980. (Nur in Teilen mit der Hanser-Ausgabe identisch)
- Erinnerung an einen Planeten. Gedichte. Mit Zeichnungen des Autors. Wilhelm Heyne Verlag, München 1980.
- Kurze Beschreibung eines Moments der Ewigkeit. Kurzprosa. Reclam Verlag, Leipzig 1980.
- Literatur im Widerspruch. Kurzprosa. Mit Materialien. Ernst Klett Verlag, Stuttgart 1980.
- Ziellose Umtriebe. Nachrichten vom Reisen und vom Daheimsein. Kurzprosa. DTV, München 1981. (Nicht in allen Teilen identisch mit der Aufbau-Ausgabe)
- Verspätete Monologe. Reflexionen. Carl Hanser Verlag 1981.
- Futuronauten. Drama. Gustav Kiepenheuer Bühnenvertriebs-GmbH, Berlin 1981.
- Lieferung frei Haus. Mit Materialien. Kurzprosa. Ernst Klett Verlag, Stuttgart 1981.
- Diesseits des Erinnerns. Essays / Aufsätze. Carl Hanser Verlag 1982.
- Abendstimmung. Gedichte. Mit Holzschnitten von Heinz Stein. Pressendruck. Edition Toni Pongratz, Hauzenberg bei Passau 1983.
- Auf der Suche nach der wirklichen Freiheit. Geschichten. Pressendruck. Berliner Handpresse, Berlin 1983.
- Leben und Schreiben. Pfaffenweiler Literatur 17. Kurzprosa. Mit Offsetlithograhien von Horst Sobotta. Pfaffenweiler Presse, Pfaffenweiler 1983.
- Die letzten Indianer Europas. Essay. Edition Toni Pongratz, Hauzenberg bei Passau 1983.
- Stilleben. Gedichte. Carl Hanser Verlag 1983.
- Auf Noldes Spuren. Essay. Mit Fotografien von Heinz Teufel. Grube & Richter Verlag, Hamburg 1983.
- Stille Zwiesprache. Bildnisse von Deutschen. Essay / Mit Fotografien von Derek Bennett. Carl Hanser Verlag, München 1983.
- Kain und Abels Brüderlichkeit. Eine Rede. Edition Toni Pongratz, Hauzenberg bei Passau 1984.
- Zurück ins Paradies. Erzählungen. Carl Hanser Verlag 1984.
- Vor der Sintflut. Das Gedicht als Arche Noah. Frankfurter Vorlesungen. Essay. Carl Hanser Verlag 1985.
- Vogelscheuchen. Ein phantastisches Panoptikum. Essay. Mit Fotografien von Hans. W. Silvester. DuMont Buchverlag, Köln 1984.
- Der Wald. Essay / Fotografien von Guido Mangold u. a. Ellert & Richter Verlag, Hamburg 1985.
- Berliner Nächte. Laternenbilder. Essay / Mit Fotografien von Michael Engler. Ellert & Richter Verlag, Hamburg 1986.
- Toskana. Essay / Mit Fotografien von Klaus Bossemeyer. Ellert & Richter Verlag 1986
- Berlin beizeiten, Hamburg Gedichte. Carl Hanser Verlag 1987.
- Gedichte. Reclam Verlag, Stuttgart 1987.
- Zeichnungen und Beispiele. Gedichte, Epigramme und Zeichnungen. Droste Verlag, Düsseldorf 1987.
- Meine Katze. Essay / Katzen-Fotografien von Gisela Caspersen. Ellert & Richter Verlag, Hamburg 1988.
- Auf Abwegen und andere Verirrungen. Kurzprosa. Carl Hanser Verlag 1988.
- Die befleckte Empfängnis. Gedichte. Aufbau-Verlag 1988.
- Ich Du Er Sie Es. Gedichte und Zeichnungen. Ravensburger Buchverlag Otto Maier, Ravensburg 1988.
- Druckpunkt. Gedichte und Prosa über Berlin von Günter Kunert. Mit Original-Lithografien von Klaus Fußmann. Handpressendruck. Verlag Josef Peerlings, Krefeld 1988.
- Fremd daheim. Gedichte. Carl Hanser Verlag 1990.
- Aus vergangener Zukunft. Erzählungen. Aufbau-Verlag 1990.
- Gedichte und Geschichten. Zusammengestellt von Günter Kunert. Deutscher Bücherbund, Stuttgart/München 1990.
- In Schleswig Holstein. Zwischen den Meeren. Essay / Fotografien. Eulen Verlag, Freiburg 1990.
- Die letzten Indianer Europas. Kommentare zum Traum, der Leben heißt. Essays. Carl Hanser Verlag 1991.
- Ernst-Robert-Curtius-Preis für Essayistik 1991. Dokumente und Ansprachen. Essay / Reden. Bouvier Verlag, Bonn, Berlin 1991.
- Friedrich-Hölderlin-Preis. Reden zur Preisverleihung am 7. Juni 1991. Magistrat der Stadt, Bad Homburg vor der Höhe 1991.
- Mondlichtlandschaft. Gedichte und Bilder. Mit Zeichnungen von Glyn Uzzell. Edition Lutz Arnold im Steidl Verlag, Göttingen 1991.
- Ostbad: Gerhard Gäbler: Fotografien. Mit Texten von Günter Kunert. Verlag J. H. W. Dietz Nachf. Bonn 1991.
- Berlin. Essay / Fotografien von Günter Schneider. Bouvier Verlag, Bonn/Berlin 1991.
- Der Sturz vom Sockel. Feststellungen und Widersprüche. Betrachtungen und Polemiken. Carl Hanser Verlag. München 1992.
- Im toten Winkel. Ein Hausbuch. Betrachtungen und Reflexionen. Carl Hanser Verlag, München 1992.
- Morpheus aus der Unterwelt. Erzählung. Holzschnitten von Heinz Stein. Verlag Thomas Reche, Passau 1992.
- Baum. Stein. Beton. Reisen zwischen Ober- und Unterwelt. Reise-Essays. Carl Hanser Verlag, München 1994.
- Grützkes Sphinx. Kunstbetrachtung. Merlin Verlag, Gifkendorf 1994.
- Steine reden. Reflexionen. Mit einem Holzstich von Karl-Georg Hirsch. Verlag Thomas Reche, Passau 1994.
- Auf leisen Pfoten. Essay / Katzen-Fotografien von Gisela Caspersen. Ellert & Richter Verlag, Hamburg 1995.
- Der Prophet Theodor Lessing. Ein Vortrag. Essay. europäische ideen, Berlin 1995, Donat Verlag, Bremen 1995.
- Schatten entziffern, Gedichte, Prosa. 1950 – 1994. Reclam Verlag, Leipzig 1995.
- Dschamp. Nr. 8. Elegien. Mit Siebdruckgrafiken von Roger David Servais. Handpressendruck. Edition Galerie auf Zeit, Berlin 1995.
- Aufmerken. Gedicht. Mit einem Holzstich von Karl-Georg Hirsch. Pressendruck. Mega-art Presse, Karow [1995].
- Mein Golem. Gedichte. Carl Hanser Verlag, München 1996.
- Günter Kunert. Lyrik und Prosa. Edition Gedichte-Bühne, Esslingen 1996.
- Erwachsenenspiele. Autobiography (until 1979). Carl Hanser Verlag 1997.
- Islandwinter. Gedicht. Pressendruck. Mit zwei Holzschnitten von Karl-Georg Hirsch. Verlag Thomas Reche, Passau 1997.
- Eine Geschichte, die ich nicht schreiben konnte. Erzählung. Mit zwei Kupferstichen von Baldwin Zettl. Verlag Thomas Reche, Passau 1997.
- Da sind noch ein paar Menschen in Berlin. Essay / Fotografien von Konrad Hoffmeister. C. J. Bucher Verlag, München 1999.
- Katzen. Eine Bilderreise. Essay und Fotografien. Ellert & Richter Verlag, Hamburg 1999 (veränd. Auflage 2002).
- Der steinerne Gast – Goethe unterwegs in Weimarer Wohnzimmern. Essay / Fotografien von Harald Wenzel-Orf. Glaux Verlag Christine Jäger, Jena 1999.
- Die Therapie. Erzählung. Mit zwei Radierungen von Gerhart Bergmann. Verlag Thomas Reche, Passau 1999.
- Immer wieder am Anfang. Erzählungen und kleine Prosa. Reclam Verlag Stuttgart 1999.
- Nacht Vorstellung.Gedichte. Carl Hanser Verlag 1999.
- Gedichte. Herausgegeben von Raoul Schrott, Siegfried Völlger und Michael Krüger. Carl Hanser Verlag 1999.
- „Eine Reise nach W. 2“ – „Mehr Licht“. Gedichte. Mit sechs Holzschnitten von Martin Max. Martin Max, Weimar 1999.
- Die Intellektuellen als Gefahr für die Menschheit oder Macht und Ohnmacht der Literatur. Gespräch Günter Kunert und Reiner Kunze. Kunststiftung der Landesbank SH. Kiel 1999.
- Mit hundert Jahren war ich noch jung. Die ältesten Deutschen. Essay. Mit Fotografien von Harald Wenzel-Orf. Econ Verlag, München 2000.
- Nachrichten aus Ambivalencia. Erinnerungen. Aphorismen. Reflexionen. Wallstein Verlag, Göttingen 2001.
- Aus fünf Jahrzehnten. Weilheimer Hefte zur Literatur, 53. Ausgabe, Weilheim 2001.
- So und nicht anders. Ausgewählte und neue Gedichte. München: Carl Hanser Verlag. 2002.
- Zu Besuch in der Vergangenheit. Erinnerungen. Ill. von Kurt Löb. Verlag Thomas Reche, Passau 2002.
- Kopfzeichen vom Verratgeber. Gedichte und Hinterglasmalereien. Ullstein Verlag, Berlin, München 2002.
- Vertrieben aus Eden. Liebesgedichte. Mit Siebdruckgrafiken von Roger David Servais. Handpressendruck. Edition Galerie auf Zeit, Berlin 2002.
- Grabrede. Erzählung. Mit Zeichnungen von Thomas Rug. Verlag Thomas Reche, Passau 2004.
- Die Botschaft des Hotelzimmers an den Gast. Aufzeichnungen. Erinnerungen. Aphorismen. Reflexionen. Carl Hanser Verlag, München 2004, ISBN 3-446-20460-1.
- Neandertaler Monologe. Gedichte und Zeichnungen. Verlag Thomas Reche, Passau 2004.
- Kunerts Antike. Eine Anthologie. Herausgegeben von Bernd Seidensticker und Antje Wessels. Rombach Verlag, Freiburg im Breisgau 2004.
- Hier und jetzt – und einmal. Stadtbilder von André Krigar mit Gedichten von Günter Kunert. Dahlemer Verlagsanstalt, Berlin 2004.
- Die Brüste der Pandora. Weisheiten aus dem Alltagsleben. Kurzprosa. Lyrik. Zeichnungen. Mit Radierungen von Rudolf Grossmann und Hans Gött und einer Originallithografie von Hugo Troedle. Emphemera, München 2004.
- Ohne Botschaft. Gedichte. Verlag zu Klampen, Springe 2005.
- Katzen des Südens. Essay. Mit Fotografien von Christina Krutz und Harald Braun. Elisabeth Sandmann Verlag, München 2005.
- Im letzten Garten. Besuch bei toten Dichtern. Essay. Herausgegeben und mit Fotografien von Peter Andreas. Gerstenberg Verlag, Hildesheim 2005.
- Wohnen. Die Stadt als Museum. Das Stadion. Essays. Mit Radierungen von Friedel Anderson. Quetsche Verlag für Buchkunst, Witzwort 2005.
- In der Ferne. Gedicht. Leporello. Handkolorierte Radierung von Gisela Mott-Dreizler. Quetsche Verlag für Buchkunst, Witzwort 2005.
- Irrtum ausgeschlossen. Geschichten zwischen gestern und morgen. storie. Carl Hanser Verlag 2006.
- Josephine im Dunkeln. Kinderbuch. Leiv Verlag, Leipzig 2006.
- Aus der realen Fabelwelt. poems. Verlag UN ART IG, Aschersleben 2006. Hrsg. von Paul Alfred Kleinert innerhalb der Lyrikreihe "Zeitzeichen", ISBN 3-9810379-1-X.
- Der alte Mann spricht mit seiner Seele. Gedichte und Zeichnungen. Wallstein Verlag, Göttingen 2006.
- Vom Mythos alter Bäume. Essay / Baum-Fotografien von Maik Döser. Ellert & Richter Verlag, Hamburg 2006.
- angesichts dessen. Betrachtungen. Mit vier Linolschnitten von Johannes Grützke. Maximilian-Gesellschaft e, Stuttgart V. 2006.
- Endgültig morgens um vier. poems. Mit 18 Original-Farblithographien von Klaus Fußmann. Edition Eichthal, Eckernförde 2007.
- Auskunft für den Notfall. Essays, Aufsätze, Reden. Hrsg. von Hubert Witt, Carl Hanser Verlag 2008, ISBN 3-446-20991-3.
- Die wunderbaren Frauen. stories. Mit Lithografien von Hans-Ruprecht Leiß. Quetsche Verlag für Buchkunst, Witzwort 2008.
- Nächtlings abseits. Traumnotate. Mit zwei Radierungen von Günter Kunert. Leipziger Bibliophilen-Abend e. V., Leipzig 2008.
- Als das Leben umsonst war. poems. Carl Hanser Verlag 2009.
- Gestern bleibt heute. Aufzeichnungen. Mit vierzehn Fotografien von Paul Schaufe. Verlag Thomas Reche, Neumarkt 2009
- Echos. Frühe Gedichte. Privatdruck, Grosshennersdorf 2009.
- Das letzte Wort hat keiner. Über Schriftsteller und Schriftstellerei. Aufsätze, Essays, Reden und Notate. Wallstein Verlag, Göttingen 2009.
- Augenspielereien. Zeichnungen. Radierungen. Bronzen 1946 – 2010. Zahlreiche Abbildungen sowie Gedichte, Reflexionen und Notate. Handelskammer und Elsbeth Weichmann Gesellschaft, Hamburg 2010.
- Berliner Kaleidoskop. Aufzeichnungen. Mit Fotografien von Thomas Hoepker. Verlag Thomas Reche, Neumarkt 2011
- Die Geburt der Sprichwörter. Notate. Wallstein Verlag, Göttingen 2011.
- Kunerts Katzen. Gedichte, Reflexionen, Zeichnungen. Aufbau-Verlag 2012.
- Tröstliche Katastrophen. Aufzeichnungen 1999–2011. Reflexionen. Notate. Erinnerungen. Aphorismen. Carl Hanser Verlag, 2013, ISBN 3-446-24129-9.
- with Matthias Buth: Dichter dulden keine Diktatoren neben sich. Reiner Kunze. Die wunderbaren Jahre. Von Deutschland nach Deutschland. Verlag Ralf Liebe, Weilerswist 2013, ISBN 978-3-944566-05-4.
- Fortgesetztes Vermächtnis. poems. Carl Hanser Verlag 2014.
- Die geheime Bibliothek. Kurzprosa. Einblattdruck. Lithographie von Rolf Escher. The Bear Press, Bayreuth 2014.
- Gesichter Afrikas. Reflexionen. With photoes by Isolde Ohlbaum. Donat Verlag, Bremen 2015.
- Der Schatz. Notat. Einblattdruck. Schablithographie von Rolf Münzner. The Bear Press, Bayreuth 2015.
- Vertrackte Affären. poems. Carl Hanser Verlag 2016.
- Auftritt der Herren Dichter. poem. Einblattdruck. Mehrfarbige Holzschnitte von Karl-Georg Hirsch. The Bear Press, Bayreuth 2016.
- Gedichte und Collagen. edited by Carl-Walter Kottnik. Hamburg 2016.
- Nächtlings Verwandelt. Traumnotate. The Bear Press, Bayreuth 2016.
- Aus meinem Schattenreich. poems. Carl Hanser Verlag 2018.
- Ohne Umkehr. Notate. Wallstein Verlag, Göttingen 2018.
- Die zweite Frau. novel. Wallstein Verlag, Göttingen 2019, ISBN 978-3-8353-3440-3.
- Zu Gast im Labyrinth. Neue Gedichte. Carl Hanser Verlag 2019, ISBN 978-3-446-26463-2.

=== Film scripts ===
Kunert wrote several film scripts for the DEFA, including:

- 1953: Das Stacheltier: Eine Liebesgeschichte
- 1960: Seilergasse 8 – direction: Joachim Kunert
- 1962: Das zweite Gleis – direction: Joachim Kunert
- 1962/1990: Monolog für einen Taxifahrer – direction: Günter Stahnke
- 1963: Vom König Midas
- 1968: Abschied – direction: Egon Günther
- 1976: Beethoven – Tage aus einem Leben – direction: Horst Seemann
- 1977: Unterwegs nach Atlantis (film) – direction: Siegfried Kühn

West Germany

- 1971: Karpfs Karriere – direction: Bernhard Wicki
- 1982: Ein Stück Himmel – direction: Franz Peter Wirth
- 1984: The Blind Judge (TV series, 13 episodes) – direction: Vojtěch Jasný
- 1984: Die Rückkehr der Zeitmaschine – direction: Jürgen Karl Klauß
- 1985: Der Schiedsrichter – direction: Rolf von Sydow

=== Film ===
- Günter Kunert und die Sächsische Schweiz, by Claus Spahn, WDR 1993
