= The Assault of the Present on the Rest of Time =

1998 film by Alexander Kluge

- Directed by: Alexander Kluge
- Written by: Alexander Kluge
- Produced by: Alexander Kluge; Willi Segler
- Starring: Jutta Hoffmann; Armin Mueller-Stahl; Hans-Michael Rehberg
- Cinematography: Hermann Fahr; Werner Lüring; Thomas Mauch
- Edited by: Jane Seitz
- Production companies: Kairos-Film; Städtische Bühnen Frankfurt am Main; Zweites Deutsches Fernsehen (ZDF)
- Distributed by: Filmwelt (1985) (West Germany) (theatrical); Edition Filmmuseum (2007) (worldwide) (DVD)
- Release dates: 31 October 1985 (West Germany); 7 September 1986 (Canada (Toronto Festival of Festivals)); 21 September 1986 (USA); 20 June 1998 (Germany (TV premiere))
- Running time: 113 min
- Country: West Germany
- Language: German

The Assault of the Present on the Rest of Time (German: Der Angriff der Gegenwart auf die übrige Zeit) is a film made in West Germany in 1985. It is written and directed by Alexander Kluge. The entire film was filmed in Frankfurt am Main, Hessen, Germany. The film's working title was Unheimlichkeit der Zeit. An alternate English title of the film is The Blind Director.

== Cast ==
- Jutta Hoffmann as Gertrud Meinecke
- Armin Mueller-Stahl as Blind Director
- Hans-Michael Rehberg as Herr von Gerlach
- Peter Roggisch as Großer Chef
- Rosel Zech as Ärztin
- Maria Slatinaru as Sängerin der Tosca
- Günther Reich as Sänger des Polizeichefs Scarpia
- Piero Visconti as Sänger des Cavaradossi
- Edgar M. Böhlke as Schrotthändler
- Henning Burk as Heimarbeiter
- Alfred Edel as Motivforscher
- André Jung as Chauffeur Max
- Bernd Schmidt as Reporter
- Claudia Buckler ss Dienstmädchen Elsa
- Rosemarie Fendel as Frau von Gerlach

== Awards ==
At the German Film Awards ceremony of 1986, the film won a "Film Award in Silver" for the Shaping of a Feature Film (Kairos Film). It was also nominated for a "Film Award in Gold" in the category of "Outstanding Feature Film" (Kairos Film).
