= Morenga (film) =

1985 film

- Film poster
- Directed by: Egon Günther
- Written by: Egon Günther; Uwe Timm
- Produced by: Wolf-Dietrich Brücker
- Starring: Ken Gampu; Jacques Breuer
- Cinematography: Gernot Roll
- Release date: 1985
- Running time: 112 minutes
- Country: West Germany
- Language: German

Morenga is a 1985 West German drama film directed by Egon Günther. It is based on the 1978 novel Morenga by Uwe Timm, and was entered into the 35th Berlin International Film Festival. It is set in the aftermath of the Second Boer War.

== Cast ==
- Ken Gampu as Jacob Morenga
- Jacques Breuer as Gottschalk
- Edwin Noël as Wenstrup
- Gideon Camm as Jakobus
- Jürgen Holtz as v. Kageneck
- Manfred Seipold as v. Koppy
- Tobias Hoesl as v. Treskow
- Nomsa Nene as Katharina
- Sam Williams as Johannes Christian
- Harrison Coburn as v. Schwanebach
- Arnold Vosloo as v. Schiller
- Robert Whitehead as Haring
- Vernon Dobtcheff as Lohmann
- Brian O'Shaughnessy as Herr Lüdemann
