= Barbara Dittus =

German actress (1939–2001)

- Born: 11 July 1939; Guben, Germany
- Died: 25 June 2001 (aged 61); Berlin, Germany
- Occupation: Actress
- Years active: 1959–2001

Barbara Dittus (11 July 1939 – 25 June 2001) was a German film actress. She appeared in more than ninety films from 1959 to 2001.

== Selected filmography ==
Film
Year	Title	Role	Notes
1984	Woman Doctors		
1981	Our Short Life		
1978	Anton the Magician		
1978	Seven Freckles		
1974	Johannes Kepler		
1972	Her Third		
