= Roger David Servais =

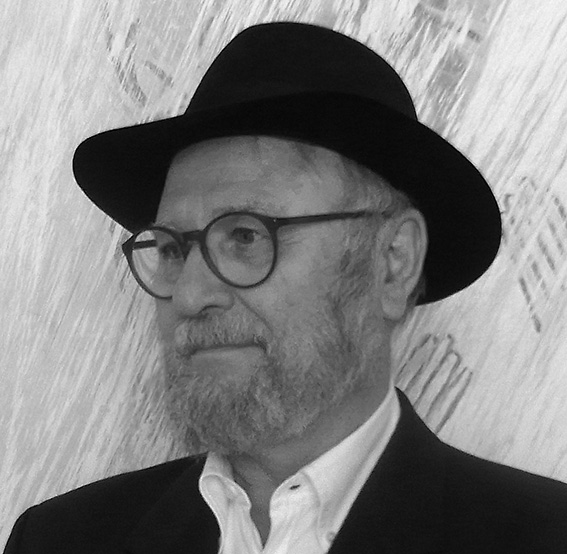
- Roger David Servais in 2015
- Born: 1942 (age 83–84); Liège, Belgium
- Occupations: Painter, graphic artist, sculptor and designer

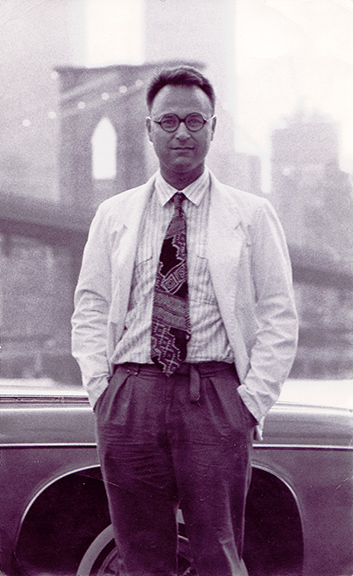
Roger David Servais in New York, 1984 © Roger David Servais

Roger David Servais (born in 1942 in Liège, Belgium) is a Belgian painter, graphic artist, sculptor and designer.

== Life ==
Roger David Servais spent his childhood in Liège, Brussels and Berlin. In 1961 he began his studies of painting and design at the School of Art in West Berlin. When the Soviet sector became segregated by the Berlin Wall, he married his girlfriend Waltraud Kolbow who lived in the eastern part of the city and they moved to Berlin-Prenzlauer Berg (East Berlin). In 1965 their daughter Marguerite was born. As citizen of Belgium he was free to travel and he commuted between Brussels and Berlin, but he endured reprisals from the East German government. His art was prohibited to go on exhibition. He made use of his talents by designing book covers for publishers. By intervention of Baudouin of Belgium, his wife and daughter were allowed to leave the German Democratic Republic in 1973 and settle in Belgium. In 1974 Roger Davis Servais continued his studies of art at West Berlin's School of Arts, which, in 1963, he had been forced to intermit. His most influential teacher was Otto Hofmann, a former pupil of the Bauhaus. In 1979 he became a member of the Deutscher Künstlerbund. In the 1980s Roger David Servais worked in Belgium, France, Israel, New York City, Sweden and Italy. From 1990 onwards he joined the painter and civil rights activist Bärbel Bohley in her quest to shed light upon oppression and instrumentalization of the arts in the GDR. They both initiated Klaus Schröder's und Hannelore Offner's book Eingegrenzt – Ausgegrenzt: Bildende Kunst und Parteiherrschaft in der DDR 1961-1989 (Limited - Excluded: Art and the Party's Control inside the GDR between 1961 and 1989) published by Berliner Akademie Verlag in 2000. After the death of his wife he married Tosca Schmalenberg in 1998. He lives and works in Berlin and Southern France.

== Work ==
Roger David Servais can be described as a „European non-conformist“. He is a figurative artist, painter, graphic artist, sculptor and designer who unites opposing techniques in his works - geometric abstraction as well as elements of symbolism and surrealism. His paintings and drawings visualize complex religious, historic and autobiographic statements which are expressed in an indirect and subtle way and are partly encrypted. Single letters play a significant role, hinting at the context rather than identifying it; the colours contribute to the painting's essential meaning, too. The relation of shape and space is a very important element.

== Paintings (selection) ==
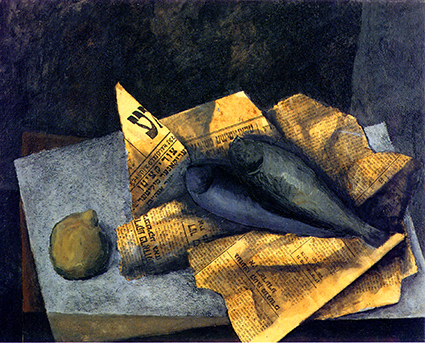
Stillleben mit Fischen, 65 cm × 50 cm, Öl, Collage, Hartfaser, 1965

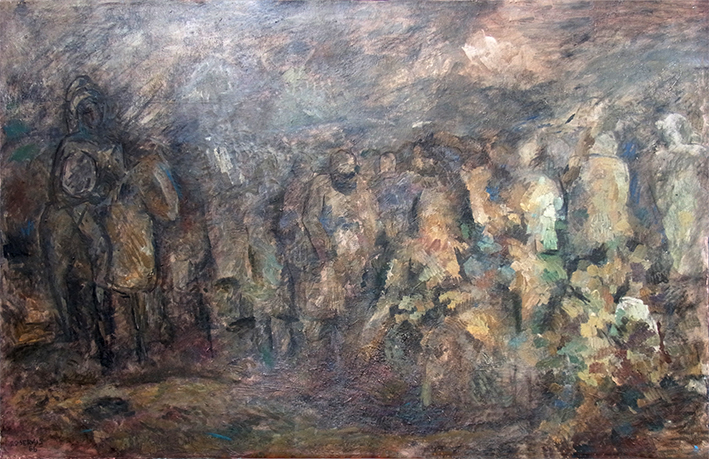
Churban, 120 cm x 76 cm, Öl, Leinwand, 1966

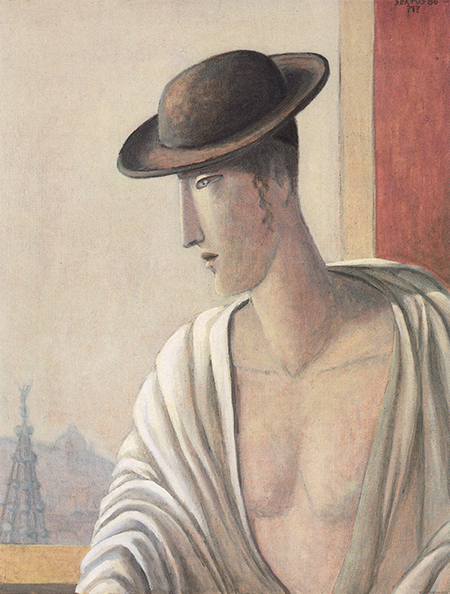
Selbstbildnis in Brüssel, 60 cm × 70 cm, Öl, Leinwand, 1986

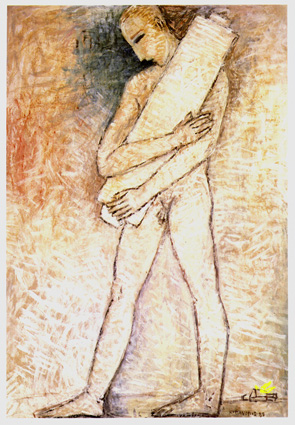
Flüchtling, 135 cm × 180 cm, Acryl, Karton, 1991

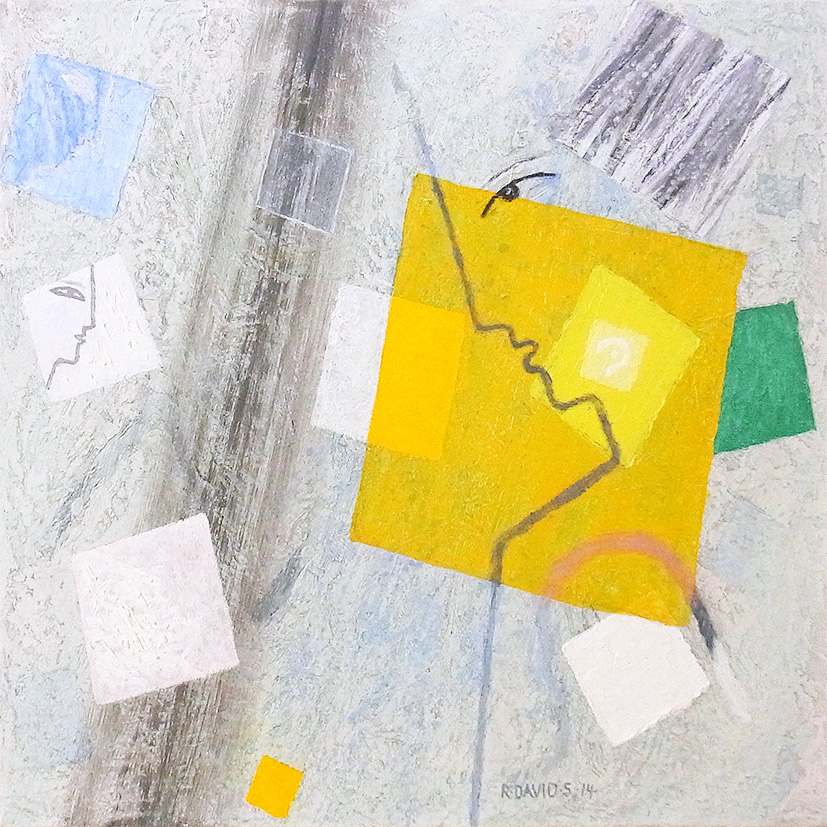
Beth, 70 cm × 70 cm, Öl, Leinwand, 2014

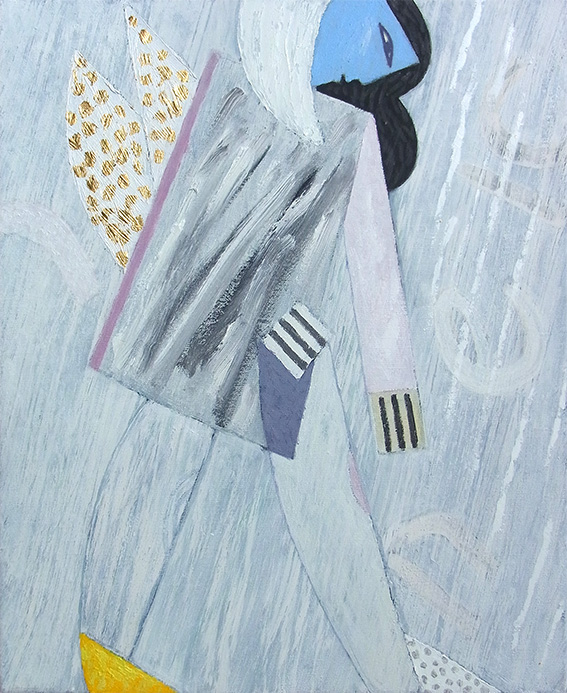
Kleiner Engel, 50 cm × 60 cm, Öl, Leinwand, 2015

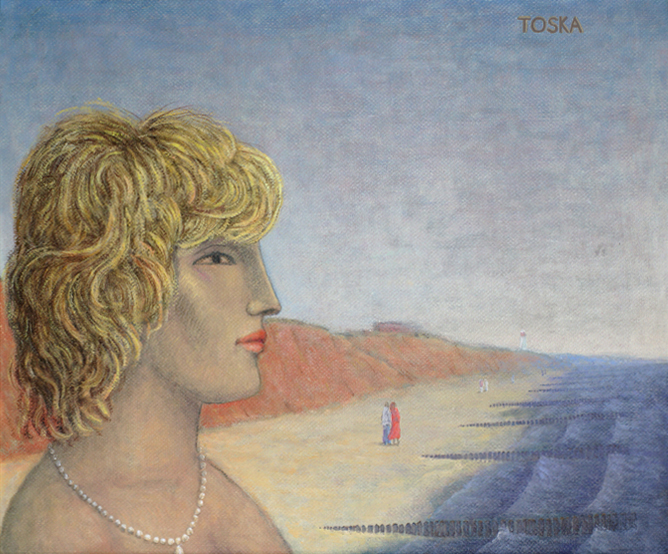
Toska, 50 cm × 60 cm, Öl, Leinwand, 2005

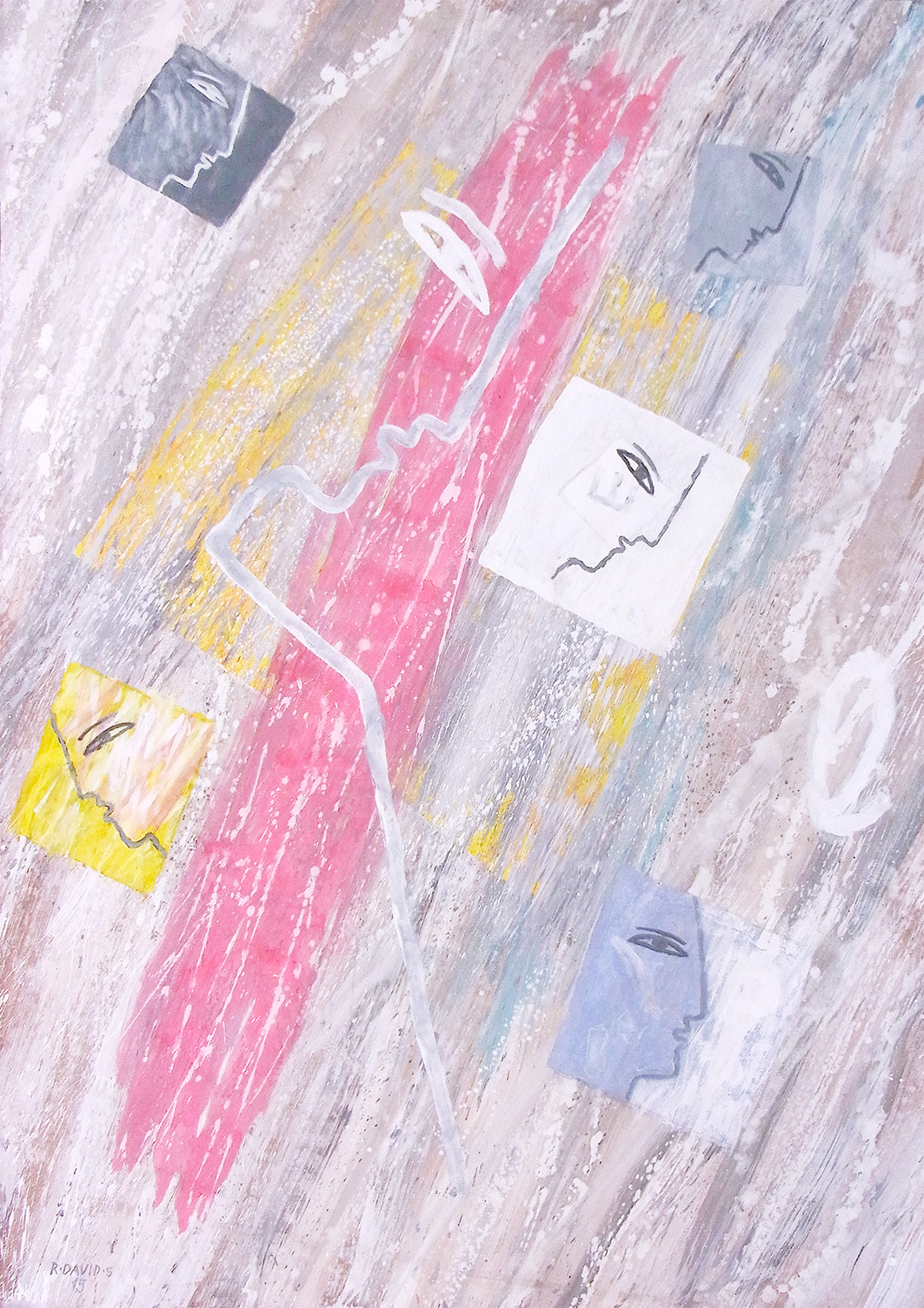
3 Töchter, 86 cm × 120 cm, Acryl, Papier, 2015

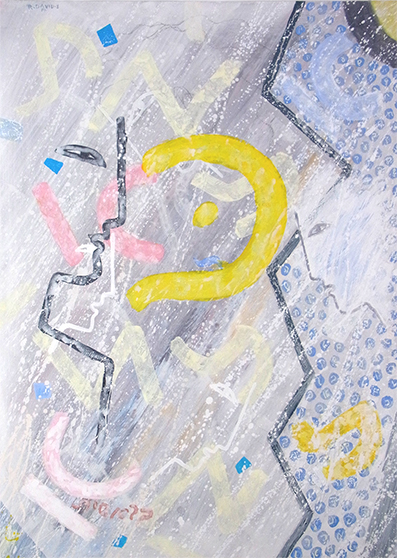
Bereshit, 86 cm × 120 cm, Acryl, Papier, 2015

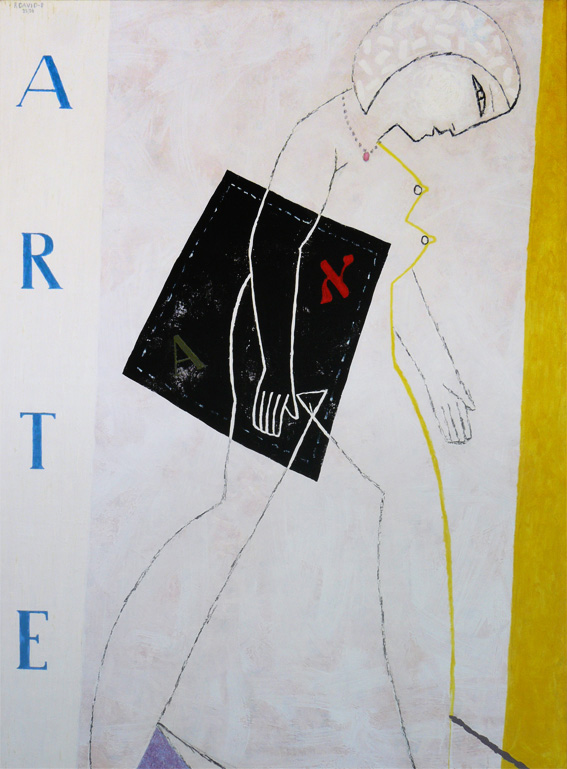
Arte, 135 cm × 180 cm, Öl, Leinwand, 1990

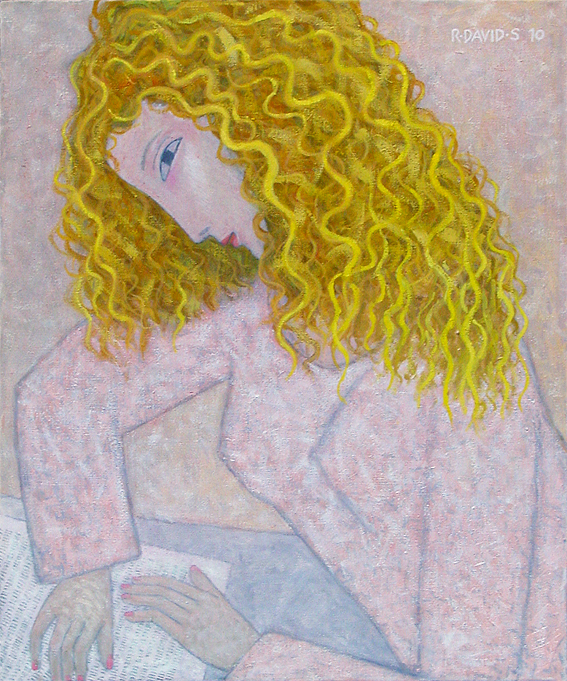
PIA, 50 cm × 60 cm, Öl, Leinwand, 2010

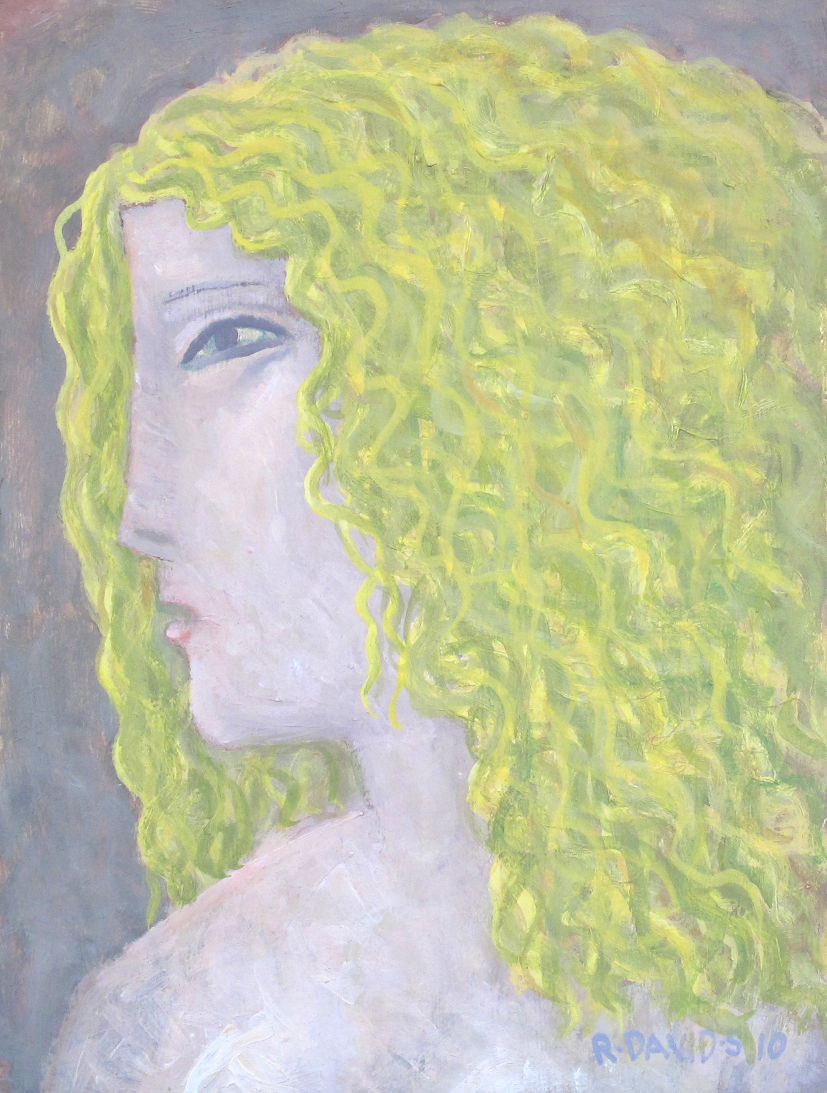
Pia, 23 cm × 30 cm, Öl, Karton, 2010

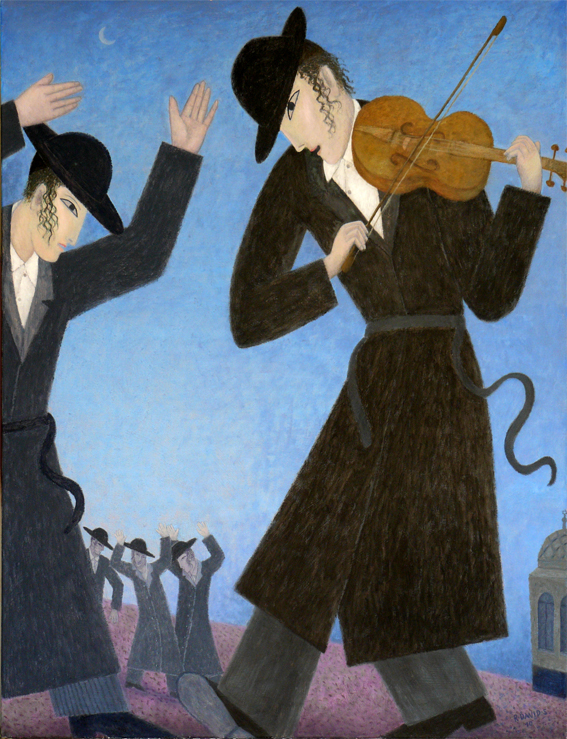
Chassidim, 100 cm x 130 cm, Öl, Leinwand, 2010

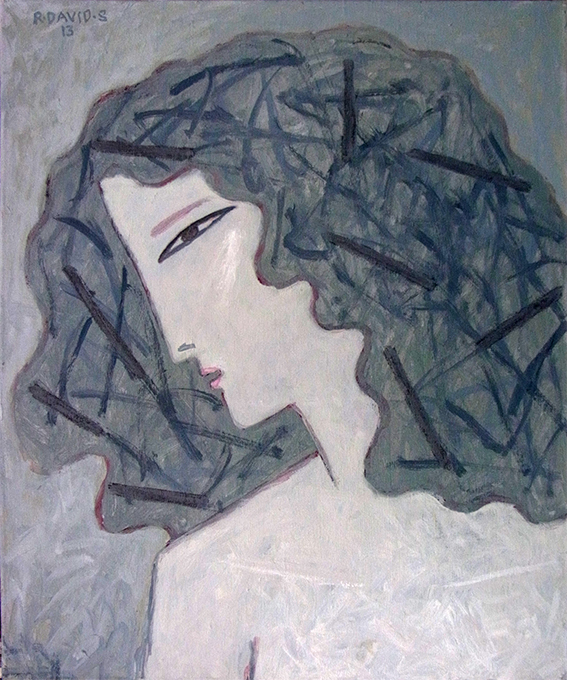
La Nice, 50 cm x 60 cm, Öl, Leinwand, 2013

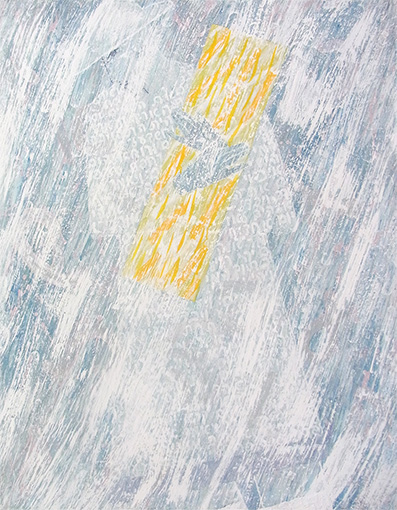
Im Licht G-ttes, 100 cm x 130 cm, Öl, Leinwand, 2010

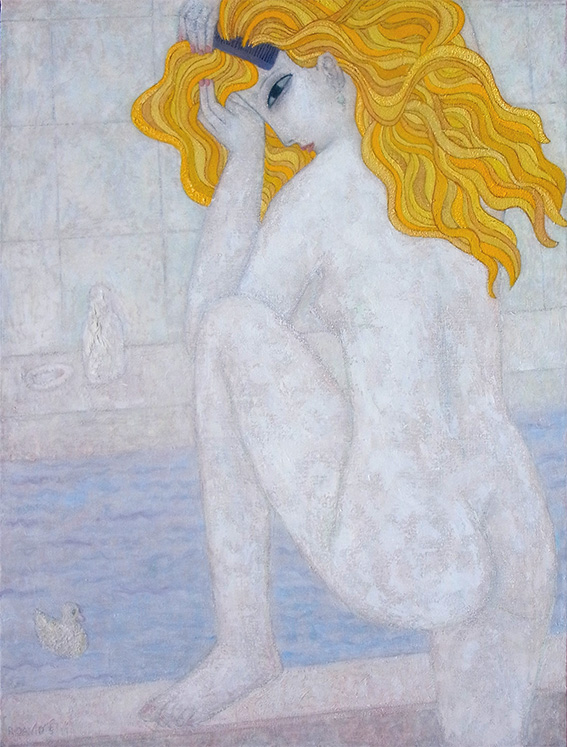
Im Bad, 50 cm x 60 cm, Öl, Leinwand, 2012

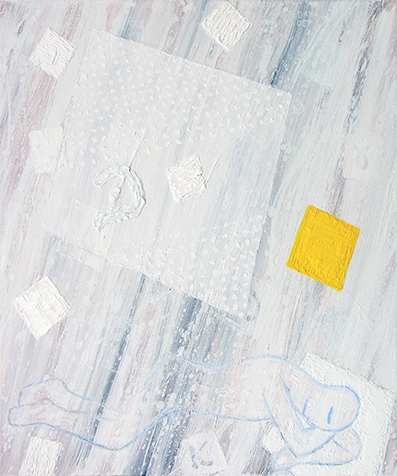
Der Traum, 50 cm x 60 cm, Öl, Leinwand, 2014

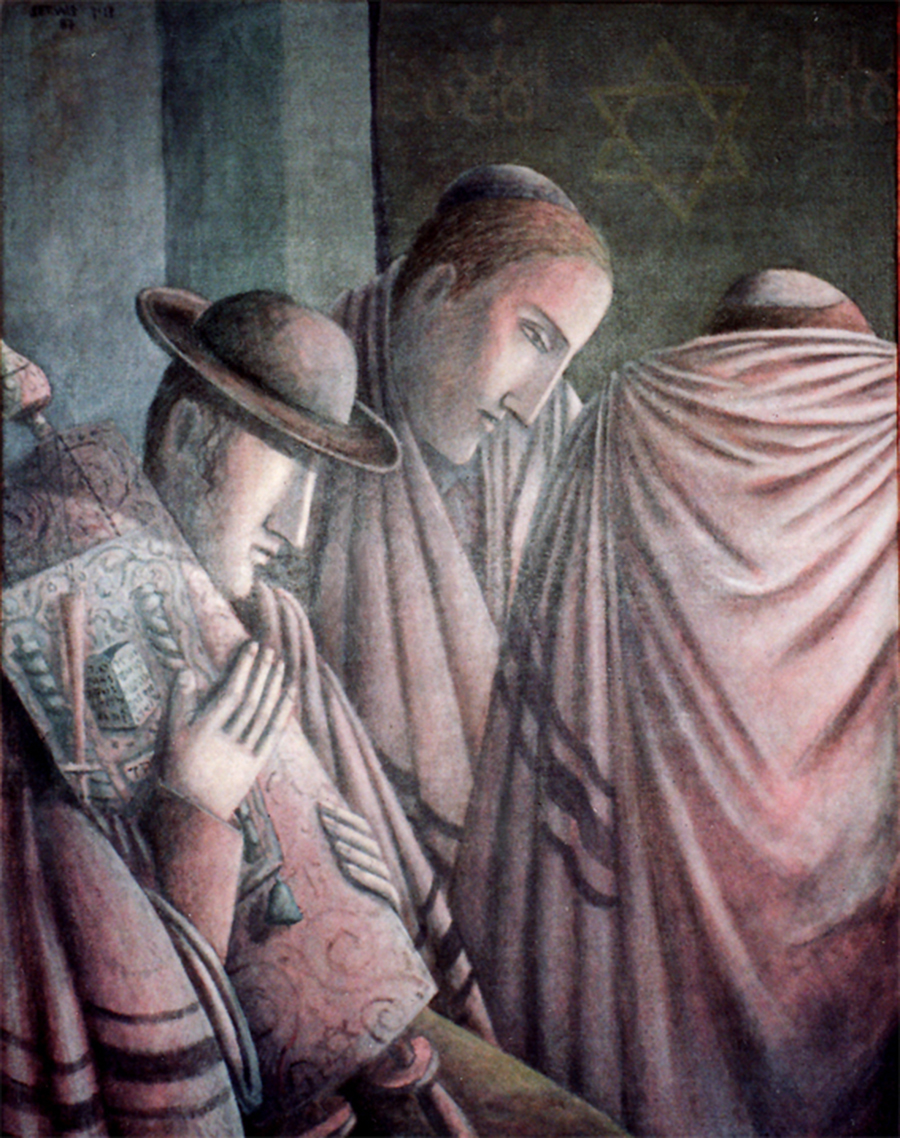
Thora-Lesung, 80 cm x 100 cm, Öl, Leinwand, 1985

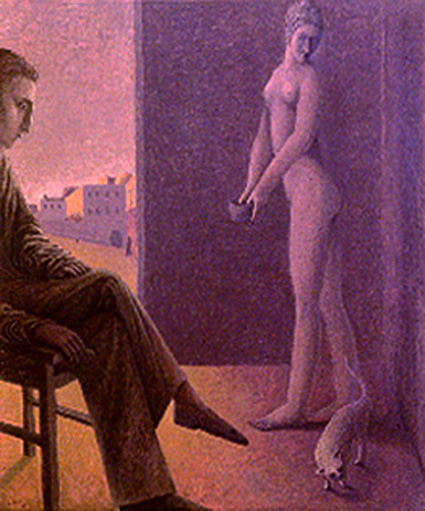
In Jerusalem, 120 cm x 130 cm, Öl, Leinwand, 1084

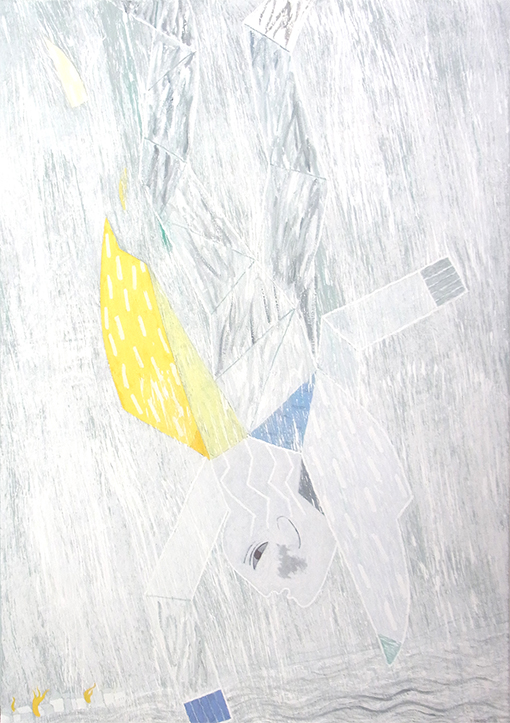
Ikarus, 120 cm x 180 cm, Öl, Leinwand, 2014

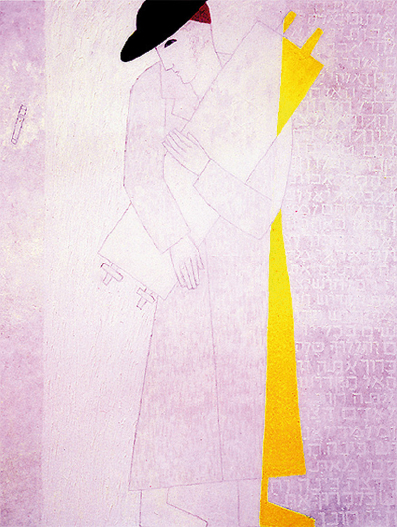
Torahträger, 135 cm x 180 cm, Öl auf Leinwand, 1990

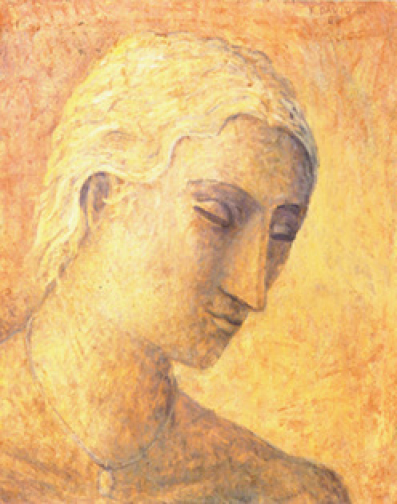
Schwedin, 40 cm x 50 cm, Öl auf Leinwand, 1988

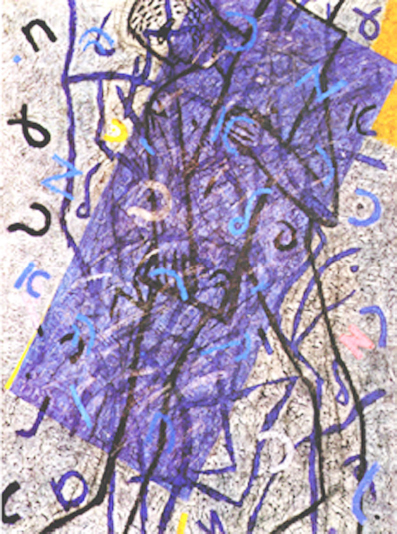
Im Wind, 135 cm x 180 cm, Öl auf Leinen, 1991

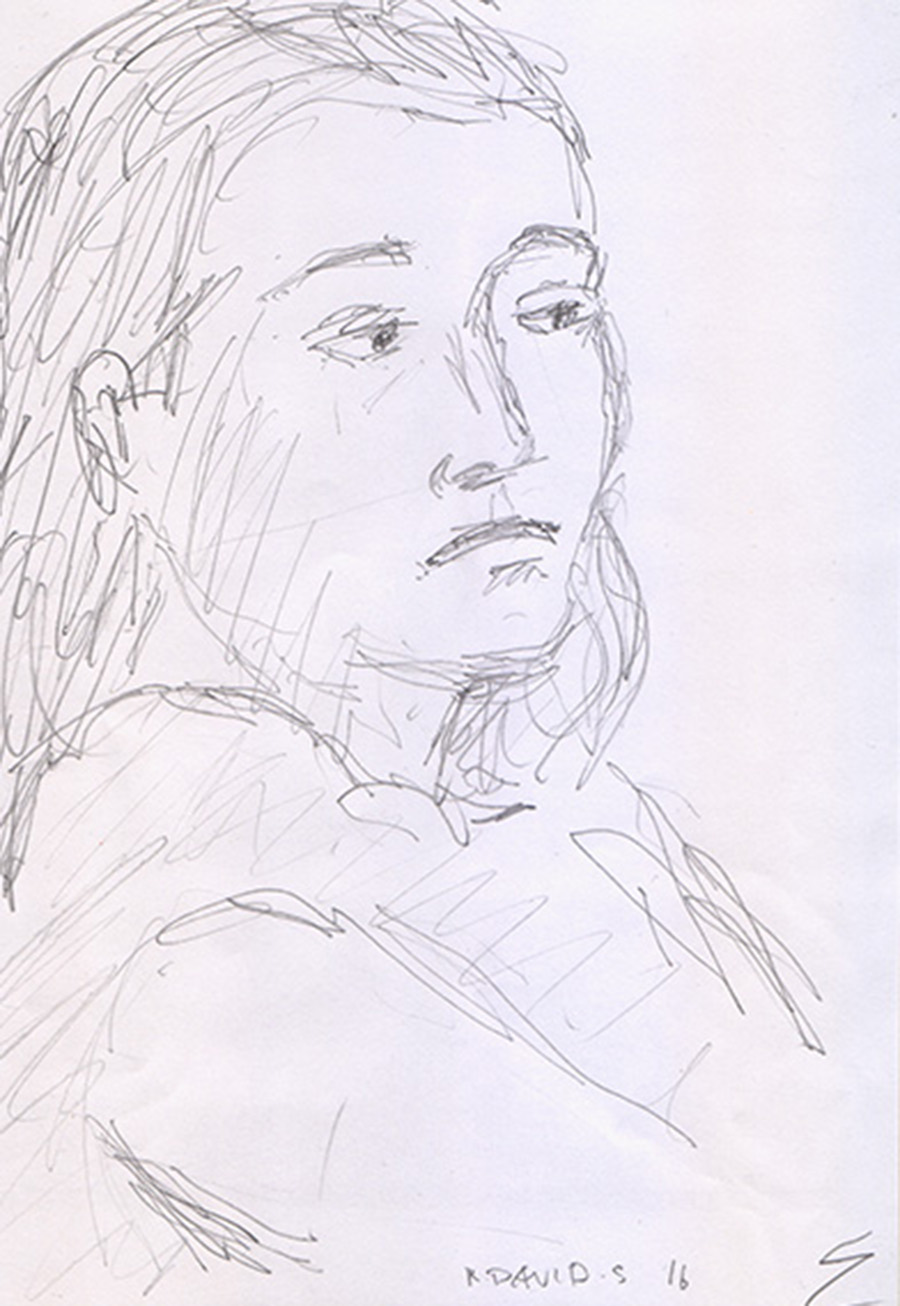
Sibylle, 21 x 29,7 cm, Graphit auf Papier, 2016

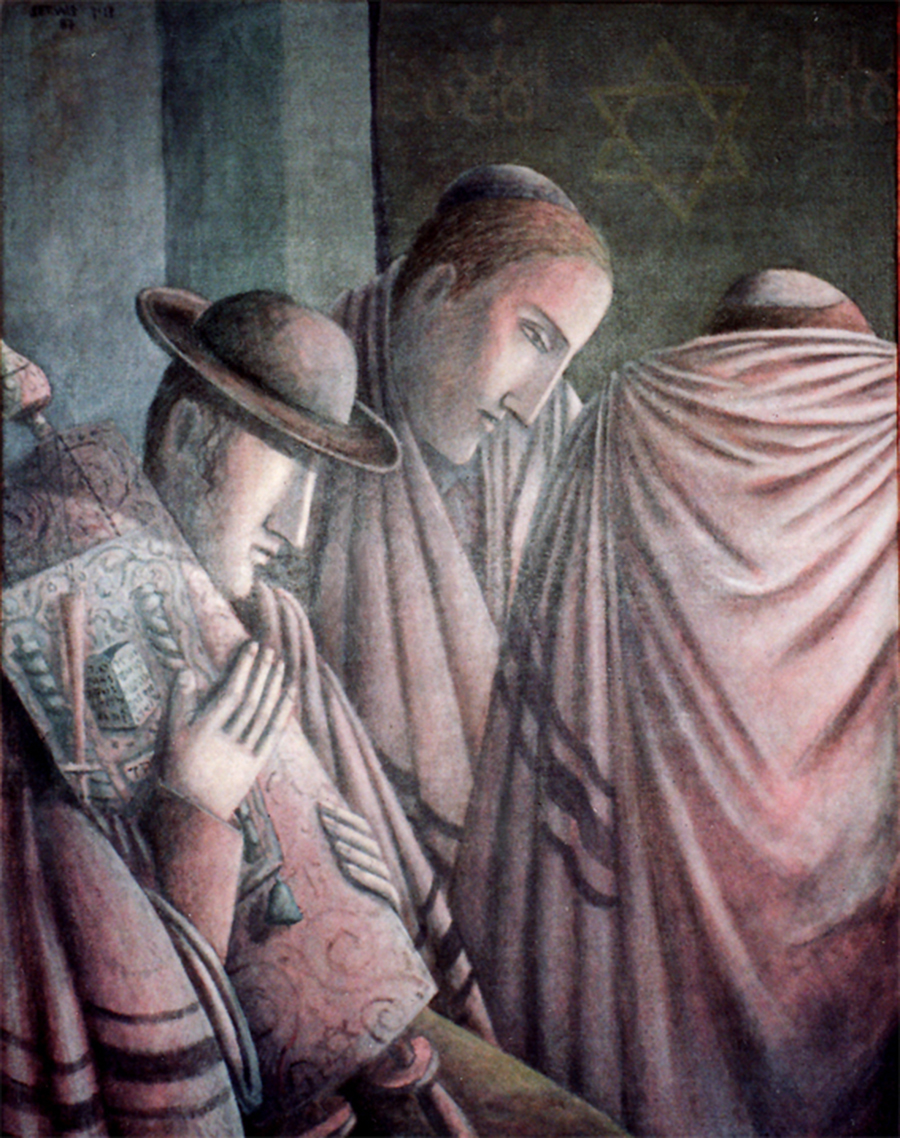
In der Synagoge, 80 x 100 cm, Öl auf Leinwand, 1985

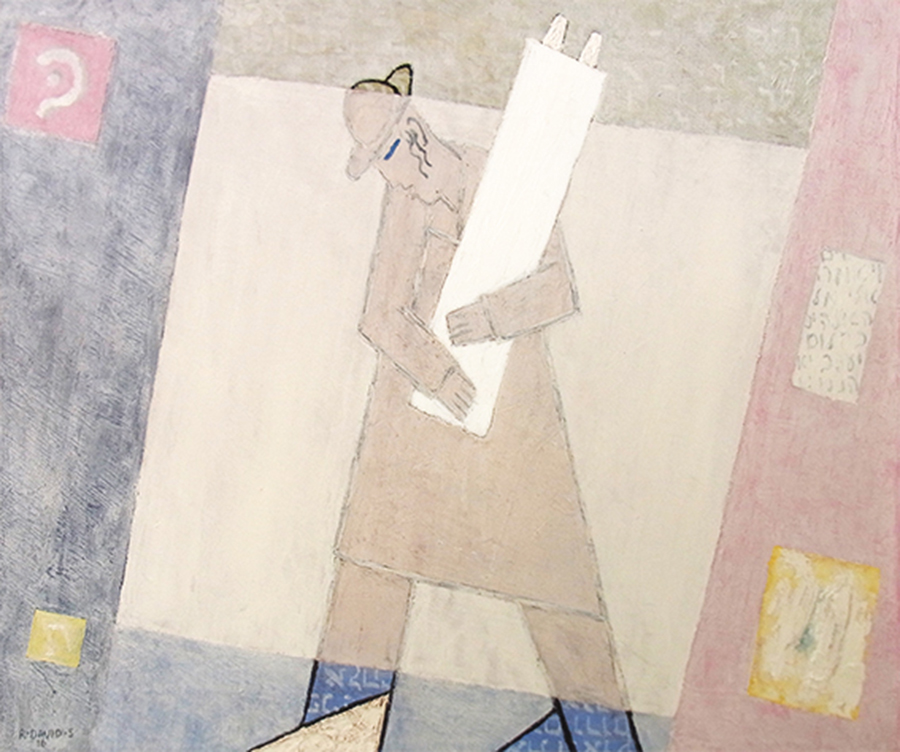
Hasid, 50 x 60 cm, Öl auf Leinwand, 2016

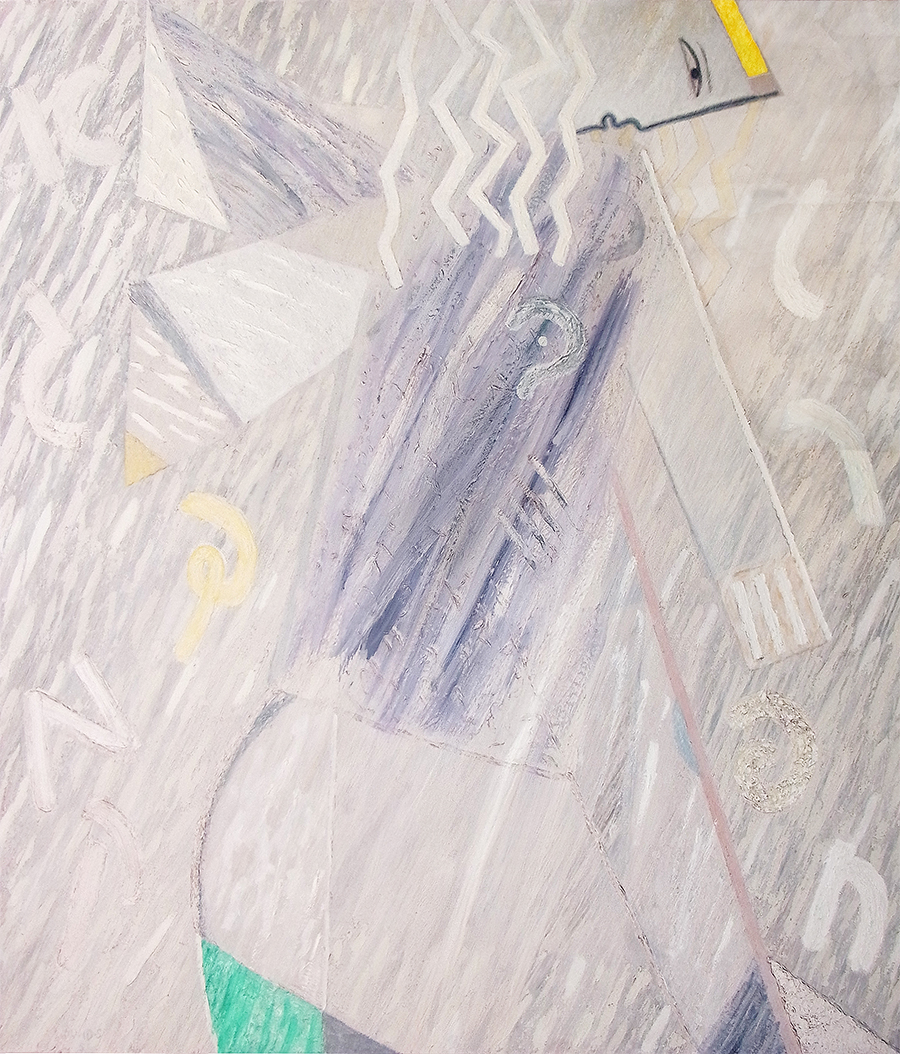
Großer Engel, 130 x 150 cm, Öl auf Leinwand, 2015

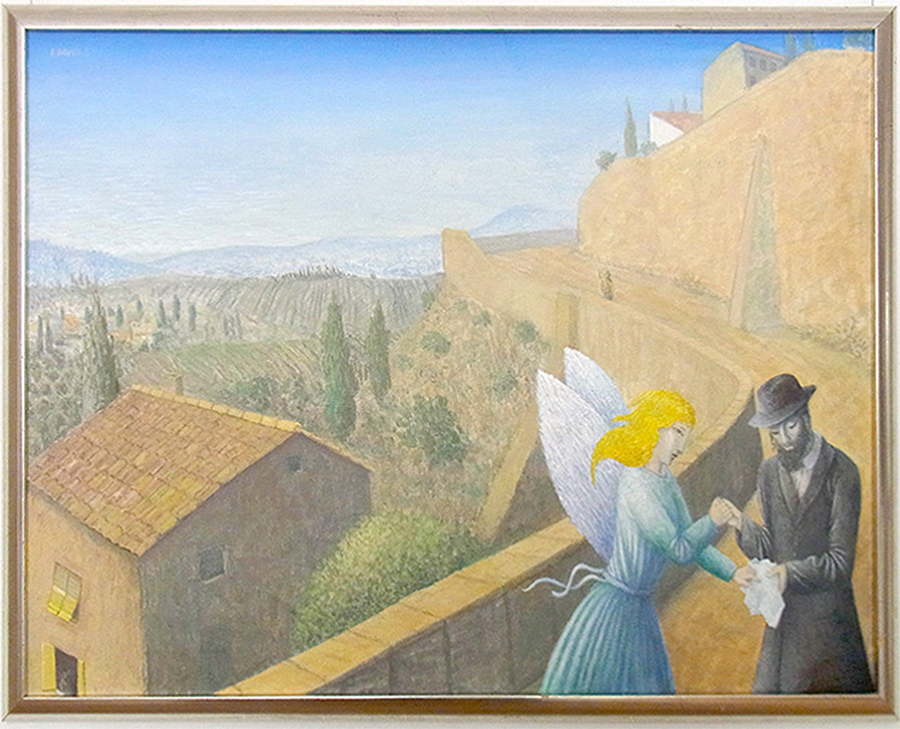
Der Vertrag, 87 x 67 cm, Öl auf Hartfaser, 1985 (2016)

== Exhibitions (selection) ==
- 1979–1984: Künstlerbund exhibition, Große Kunstausstellung, Munich
- 1981: Neue Darmstädter Secession, Darmstadt
- 1983: ADAC exhibition München
- 1984: Galerie Slominsky, Mülheim an der Ruhr
- 1985: Kunsthaus Hamburg
- 1985: Kunstverein Stuttgart
- 1986: Galerie Jacob, Oldenburg
- 1986: Neue Gruppe München
- 1987: Art prize by the City of Kirchheim
- 1987: Galerie Lietzow, Berlin
- 1990: Künstlerbund exhibition Berlin
- 1991: Goethe-Institut, Brüssel
- 1991: Galerie Niepel, Düsseldorf
- 1992: Usedomer Kunstverein, Galerie Pankow
- 1994: Künstlerbund exhibition, Galerie Niepel, Düsseldorf
- 1995: Galerie auf Zeit, Berlin
- 1999: Jüdische Visionen in Berlin
- 2004: Berliner Bank, Berlin
- 2005: Galerie Thomas Günther, Berlin
- 2009: Kunstpavillon Heringsdorf
- 2012: Schaffens(t)räume: Atelierbilder und Künstlermythen in der DDR, Gera
- 2016: Roger David Servais: A painter in no man's land between East- and West Berlin 1961-1974, Kommunale Galerie Pankow, Berlin
- 2016: Ende vom Lied: Künstlerhaus Bethanien, Berlin

== Catalogues ==
- 1981 Die neue Darmstädter Secession, Darmstadt: Mathildenhöhe Darmstadt
- 1983 80 Jahre Deutscher Künstlerbund 1903-1983: 31. Jahresausstellung Berlin: Kunstreport 3 `83, Berlin
- 1983 Spuren: Auo-Vision-Galerie: Die ADAC-Sammlung: Auto und Umwelt, Munich
- 1984 Deutscher Künstlerbund: 32. Jahresausstellung Frankfurt: Kunstreport 2 `84 Berlin
- 1984 Christine Gaspar: Een knipoog naar de Anekdote. Regenberg, Anton, Claudia Hahn-Raabe, Christine Gaspar, Roswitha Meulemann (ed.): Berlin-Brüssel 1984 Tag für Tag: Ein Rückblick, Goethe-Institut
- 1985 Konfrontationen 1,2,3. Exhibition at the Kunsthaus Hamburg from 3 May to 2 June 1985: Michael Eckle, Victor Kraus, Rolf Liese, Renate Sendler-Peters, Arno Backhaus, Michael von Cube, Franz Kochseder, Walter Raum, Jochen Sendler, Horst Hamann, Helga Jahnke, Ernst Heckelmann, Jochen Schimmelpfennig, Roger Servais, Hamburg: Kunsthaus Hamburg
- 1987 Roger David Servais: Bilder, Gouachen, Zeichnungen 1967-1987, Berlin: Galerie Lietzow
- 1990 Der Deutsche Künstlerbund in Berlin 1990, 38. Jahresausstellung Berlin
- 1992 Roger David Servais: Bilder und Gouachen, Berlin: Cultural Office Pankow
- 1992 Jüdische Künstler in Berlin, Berlin: Jewish Museum/Berlin-Museum; Martin-Gropius-Bau
- 1999 Berlin, Meshulash (editor): DAVKA: Jüdische Visionen in Berlin: Berlin
- 2000 Ästhetische Alternativen: Internationale Grafik für das Horst-Janssen-Museum Oldenburg: Donation Jürgen Weichardt, Oldenburg: Isensee
- 2012/2013 Schaffens(t)räume: Atelierbilder und Künstlermythen in der ostdeutschen Kunst, Gera: Art Collection Gera, New Orangery
- 2016 Roger David Servais: Ein Maler im Niemandsland zwischen Ost und Westberlin, Berlin: Cultural Office Pankow
- 2019 Point of No Return. Wende und Umbruch in der ostdeutschen Kunst / Transformation and Revolution in East German Art, Leipzig, Museum der bildenden Künste

== Illustrations, graphics and texts ==
- 1969 Lászlo Bóka: Graf Dénes: Roman. Linocuts by Roger Servais, Berlin: Verlag Volk und Welt
- 1970 Horst Lothar Teweleit (ed.): Taufiq al Hakim: Von Wundern und heller Verwunderung und von denen, die es mit Himmel und Hölle halten. Illustrations by Roger Servais, Berlin: Rütten & Loening
- 1995 Gerd Henniger: Spiegel im Spiegel. Szenen einer Kindheit. Sechs Radierungen von Roger David Servais, Berlin: Mariannenpresse, ISBN 3-922510-80-9.
- 1987 Sigmar Schollak, Roger Servais (illustrations): Tätowierungen: Aphorismen und Epigramme. Introduction by Günter Kunert, Berlin: Weidler, ISBN 3896931024.
- 1995 Günter Kunert: Dschamp Nr. 8: Elegien. With screen-printed graphics by Roger David Servais, Berlin: Edition Galerie auf Zeit
- 1999 Ulrich Tarlatt (ed.): Die Farbe Schwarz – Hommage a Philipp Otto Runge Halle: edition Augenweide
- 2002 Thomas Günther (ed.): Günter Kunert (texts), Roger David Servais (illustrations): Vertrieben aus Eden, Berlin, Edition Galerie auf Zeit
- 2003 Henryk Bereska: Burgschreiber zu Beeskow: Märkische Streifbilder, Berlin: Aphaia Verlag 2003, ISBN 3926677406.
- 2009 Roger David Servais: Erinnerungen an Robert Rehfeldt, in: Lutz Wohlrab (ed.): Robert Rehfeldt: Kunst im Kontakt, Berlin: Wohlrab, p. 27, ISBN 9783981429602.

== Works ==
Works by Roger David Servais can be found in private and public collections, e. g.:

- National Gallery (Berlin)
- Kupferstichkabinett Berlin
- Jewish Museum, Berlin
- Royal Museums of Fine Arts of Belgium
- Jewish Museum of Belgium
- Royal Library of Belgium
- Kupferstich-Kabinett, Dresden
- Kunstsammlung des Westdeutschen Rundfunks, Cologne
- Kunstsammlung des ADAC, Munich
- Princeton University
