= Jutta Hoffmann =

German actress

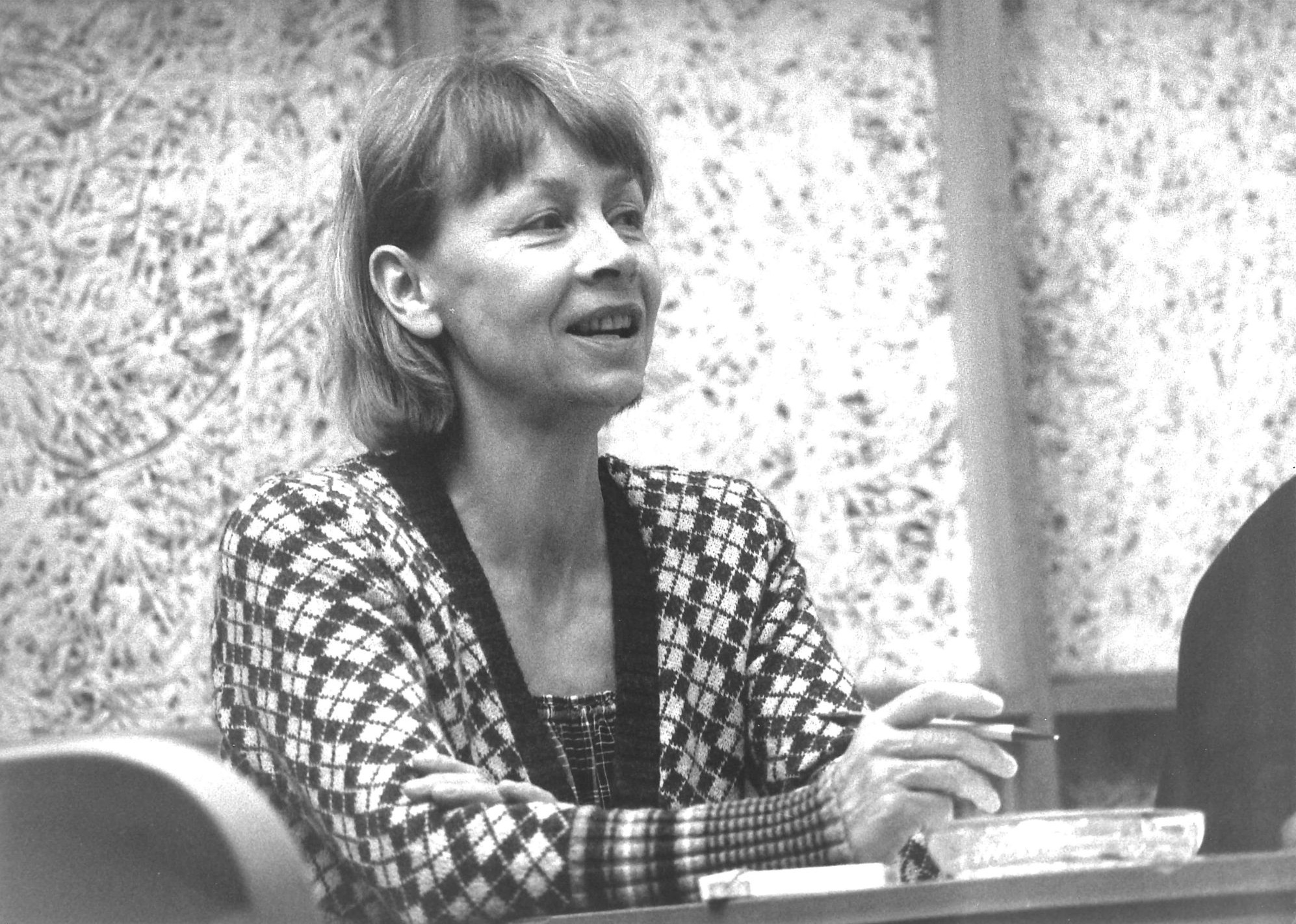
- Hoffmann in the 1990s
- Born: 3 March 1941 (age 85); Halle an der Saale, Germany
- Occupation: Actress
- Years active: 1961–present

Jutta Hoffmann (born 3 March 1941) is a German actress. She has appeared in more than 40 films and television shows since 1961.

== Selected filmography ==
- Her Third (1972)
- Lotte in Weimar (1974)
- Das Versteck (1978)
- The Assault of the Present on the Rest of Time (1985)
- Bandits (1997)
- Angst (2003)
- An die Grenze (2007)
- Die Frau aus dem Meer (2008)
