= Egon Günther =

German film director and screenwriter

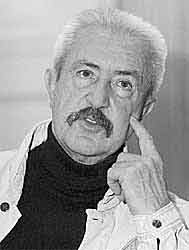
- Egon Günther in 1988
- Born: 30 March 1927; Schneeberg, Saxony, Germany
- Died: 31 August 2017 (aged 90); Potsdam, Germany
- Occupations: Film director Screenwriter
- Years active: 1961 – 2002

Egon Günther (30 March 1927 – 31 August 2017) was a German film director and writer.

His film Lotte in Weimar was nominated for the Palme d'Or at the 1975 Cannes Film Festival. In 1985, his film Morenga was nominated for the Golden Bear at the 35th Berlin International Film Festival. He was a member of the Socialist Unity Party of Germany.

== Selected filmography ==
- The Dress (co-director: Konrad Petzold, 1961) — (based on The Emperor's New Clothes)
- Lots Weib (1965)
- Wenn du groß bist, lieber Adam (1966, released 1990)
- Abschied (1968) — (based on a novel by Johannes R. Becher)
- Junge Frau von 1914 (1970, TV film) — (based on a novel by Arnold Zweig)
- Anlauf (1971, TV film) — (based on a story by Benito Wogatzki)
- Her Third (1971) — (based on a story by Eberhard Panitz)
- Education Before Verdun (1973, TV miniseries) — (based on a novel by Arnold Zweig)
- Die Schlüssel (1974)
- Lotte in Weimar (East Germany/West Germany, 1974) — (based on Lotte in Weimar: The Beloved Returns)
- Die Leiden des jungen Werthers (1976) — (based on The Sorrows of Young Werther)
- Ursula (Switzerland/East Germany, 1978, TV film) — (based on a novel by Gottfried Keller)
- Exil (1981, TV miniseries) — (based on a novel by Lion Feuchtwanger)
- Euch darf ich's wohl gestehen (1982, TV film) — (film about Goethe and Chancellor von Müller)
- Hanna von acht bis acht (1983, TV film)
- Morenga (1985) — (based on a novel by Uwe Timm)
- Mamas Geburtstag (1985, TV film)
- Die letzte Rolle (1986, TV film)
- Heimatmuseum (1988, TV miniseries) — (based on a novel by Siegfried Lenz)
- Rosamunde (1990)
- Stein (1991)
- Lenz (1992, TV film) — (film about Goethe and Jakob Michael Reinhold Lenz)
- Die Braut (1999) — (film about Goethe and Christiane Vulpius)
- Else – Geschichte einer leidenschaftlichen Frau (2000, TV film) — (based on a novel by Angelika Schrobsdorff)
