= Her Third =

Her Third Der Dritte
- Directed by: Egon Günther
- Written by: Egon Günther
- Starring: Jutta Hoffmann; Barbara Dittus; Rolf Ludwig; Armin Mueller-Stahl; Peter Köhncke
- Cinematography: Erich Gusko
- Edited by: Rita Hiller
- Music by: Karl-Ernst Sasse
- Distributed by: DEFA
- Release dates: 16 March 1972; East Berlin, GDR
- Running time: 111 minutes
- Country: East Germany
- Language: German

Her Third (German: Der Dritte) is a 1972 East German (then GDR) film directed by Egon Günther and starring Jutta Hoffmann, Barbara Dittus, Rolf Ludwig and Armin Mueller-Stahl. The film is based on the short story Unter den Bäumen regnet es zweimal by Eberhard Panitz and tells the story of the single mother Margit looking for a new partner. The film was produced in 1971 by the DEFA film studio and premiered on 16 March, 1972 in East Berlin.

== Plot ==
Margit Fließer (Jutta Hoffmann) is in her mid-thirties, has two children and has been divorced twice. She works as a mathematician in a medium-sized company where she is well respected by her colleagues. Margit has a shy and repressed personality due to her past and her childhood. Margit became a nurse in a Protestant order following the early death of her mother. Realizing that this vocation is not really for her she starts her studies at a university preparatory school. She falls in love with the lecturer Bachmann (Peter Köhncke), who becomes her first husband. The marriage fails, and she enters a second marriage with a blind man (Armin Mueller-Stahl). But her new husband is a disappointment and this second marriage also fails. She now decides to find "her third" husband herself and not leaving it up to fate. She chooses Hrdlitschka (Rolf Ludwig), a colleague, but only after some efforts and with the help of her friend Lucie (Barbara Dittus) she is successful and wins Hrdlitschka as her third husband.

== Cast ==
- Jutta Hoffmann as Margit Flieser
- Barbara Dittus as Lucie
- Armin Mueller-Stahl as The Blind Man
- Rolf Ludwig as Hrdlitschka
- Peter Köhncke as Bachmann
- Erika Pelikowsky as Reverend Mother
- Christine Schorn as Young Woman
- Jaecki Schwarz as Young Man
- Klaus Manchen as Lucies's friend

== Awards and honors ==
Her Third won two National Prizes in 1972, a third class national prize for Egon Günther for Achievements in Directing and a second class national prize for Jutta Hoffmann for Achievements in Acting. The film was screened at the Karlovy Vary International Film Festival in 1972 and at the Venice Film Festival in 1972, where Jutta Hoffmann won an award for Best Actor in the category Venezia Critici. Her Third was also chosen as East Germany's official submission to the 46th Academy Awards for Best Foreign Language Film, but did not manage to receive a nomination.

== See also ==
- List of submissions to the 46th Academy Awards for Best Foreign Language Film
- List of German submissions for the Academy Award for Best Foreign Language Film
