= Friedrich von Müller (statesman) =

German statesman (1779–1849)

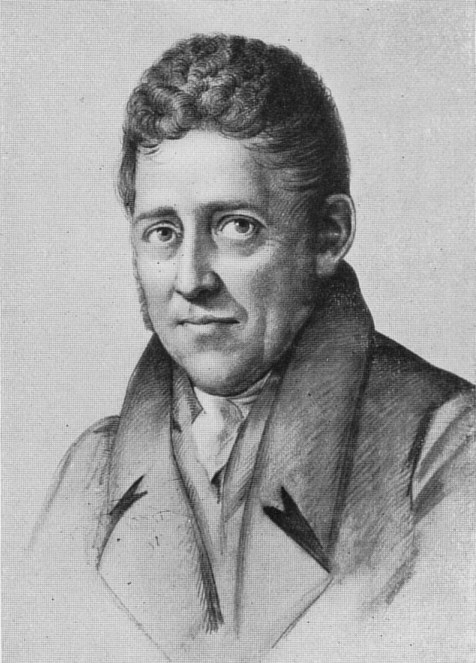

Friedrich von Müller (13 April 1779 – 21 October 1849) was a German statesman.

He was born at Kunreuth, Bavaria, studied law at Erlangen and Göttingen, and in 1801 entered the administrative employ of Weimar. His greatest political achievement was his inducing Napoleon to keep Weimar independent (1806–07). For this he was rewarded by being ennobled and raised to the post of privy councilor. Müller became chancellor in 1815, and from 1835 to 1848 was deputy.

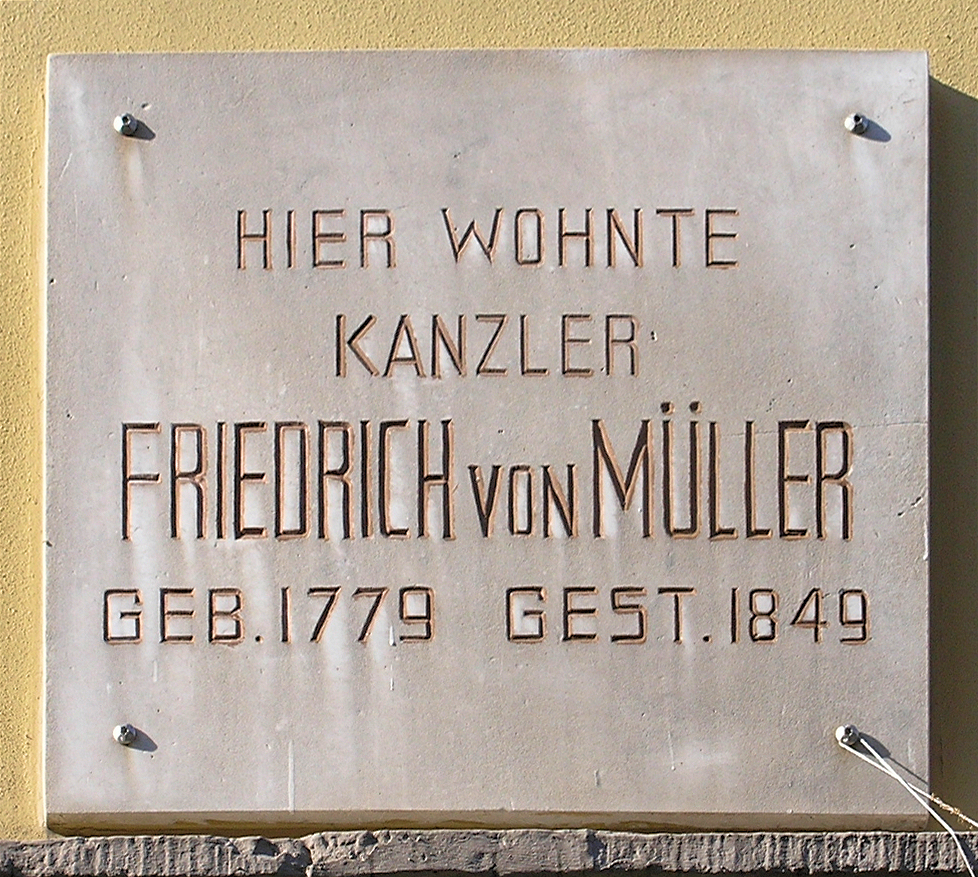
Memorial plaque, Windischenstraße 12, Weimar

He wrote Erinnerungen aus den Kriegszeiten von 1806-13 (1851). On his friendship with Goethe, see Burkhardt, Goethes Unterhaltungen mit dem Kanzler Friedrich von Müller (Stuttgart, 1870).
