= Eberhard Panitz =

German writer (1932–2021)

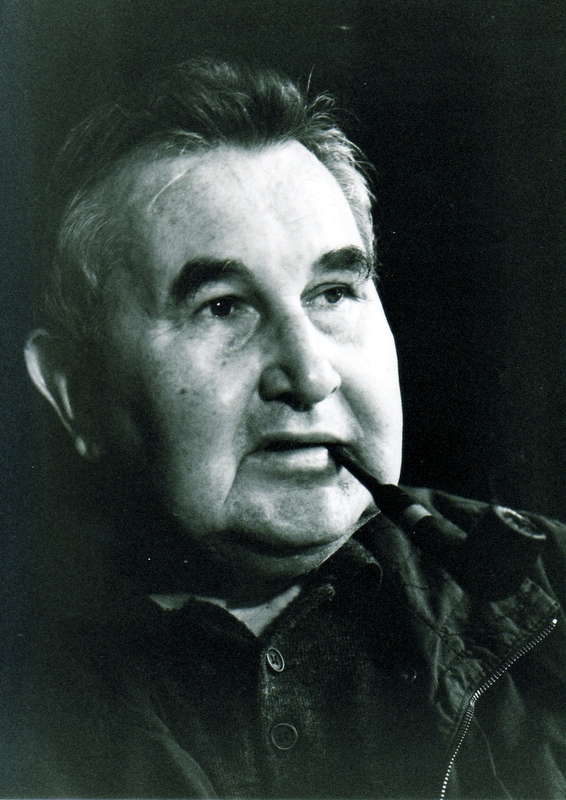
- Born: 16 April 1932; Dresden, Germany
- Died: 1 October 2021 (aged 89); Berlin, Germany
- Education: University of Leipzig
- Occupations: Writer; Screenwriter; Literary editor; Publicist
- Awards: Heinrich Mann Prize; Nationalpreis der DDR; Vaterländischer Verdienstorden

Eberhard Panitz (16 April 1932 – 1 October 2021) was a German writer, screenwriter, literary editor and publicist. He wrote epic works, documentaries, audio plays and scripts for films and television. He was committed to socialist realism, and received several awards in the German Democratic Republic (GDR). After German reunification, he continued to write for leftist publishers.

== Life ==
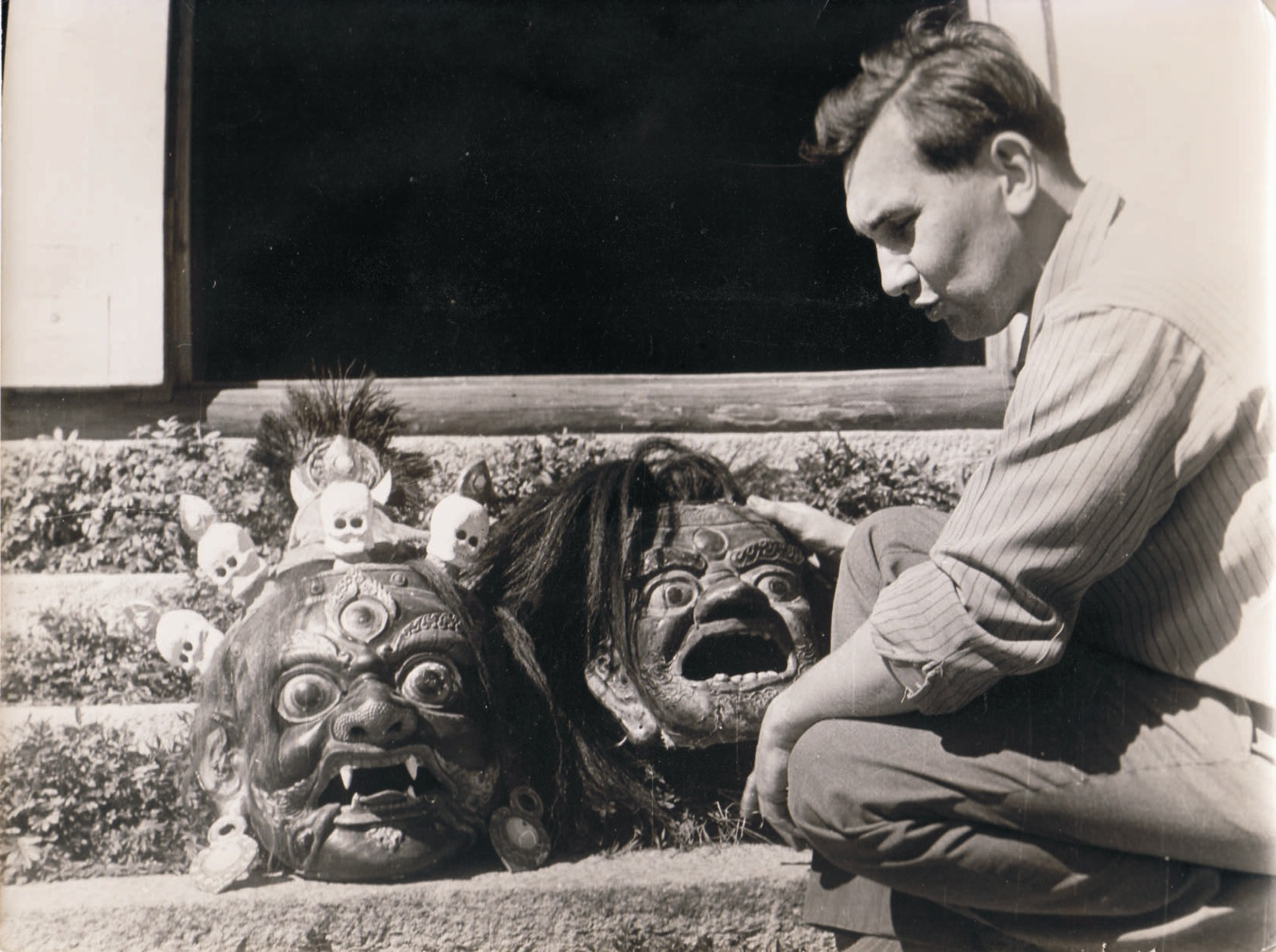
Panitz in front of a monastery on a study tour in Mongolia in 1966

Panitz was born in Dresden, the son of a tram conductor and a saleswoman. He grew up in Dresden-Trachau. He attended the Pestalozzi-Oberschule, completing with the Abitur in 1950. After working in a youth brigade building the Cranzahl Dam, he studied pedagogy and German studies at the University of Leipzig until 1953. He worked as a literary editor for both the Verlag Neues Leben and the Mitteldeutscher Verlag in Halle. He joined the Deutscher Schriftstellerverband in 1958, remaining a member until it was dissolved in 1990. He belonged to its executive board, and was vice president of its Berlin section.

Working as a freelance writer from 1959, Panitz wrote epic works, documentaries, audio plays and scripts for films and television, committed to socialist realism. His topics included building a socialist society, espionage, the bombing of Dresden and the emancipation of women. Novels such as Meines Vaters Straßenbahn (My father's tram) have autographic elements, set in Dresden. He created strong determined women characters. His novel Die unheilige Sophia (The unholy Sophia) is based on Sonja, a controversial mayor of Kolberg after World War II. The book was filmed, directed by Manfred Wekwerth, at original locations. Panitz was editor for two volumes of notable German stories (Erzählungen).

Panitz travelled frequently in socialist countries such as Vietnam, Cuba and Mongolia, resulting in books such as Gesichter Vietnams (Faces of Vietnam, 1978) and Cuba mi Amor (2004). He also travelled in the U.S. for several months. Panitz was a member of the Marxist forum of the Die Linke party.

After German reunification, his writings were released through small publishing houses dedicated to leftist topics. His 1982 novel Eiszeit, a warning of atomic weapons, was reprinted in 2016. He lived in Berlin-Grünau as a freelance writer. For decades, he also had a summer retreat which he preferred for working, first in Kolberg, and from 1974 a house in Prieros, Brandenburg, which had belonged to Christa Wolf before.

Panitz died in Berlin at age 89.

== Awards ==
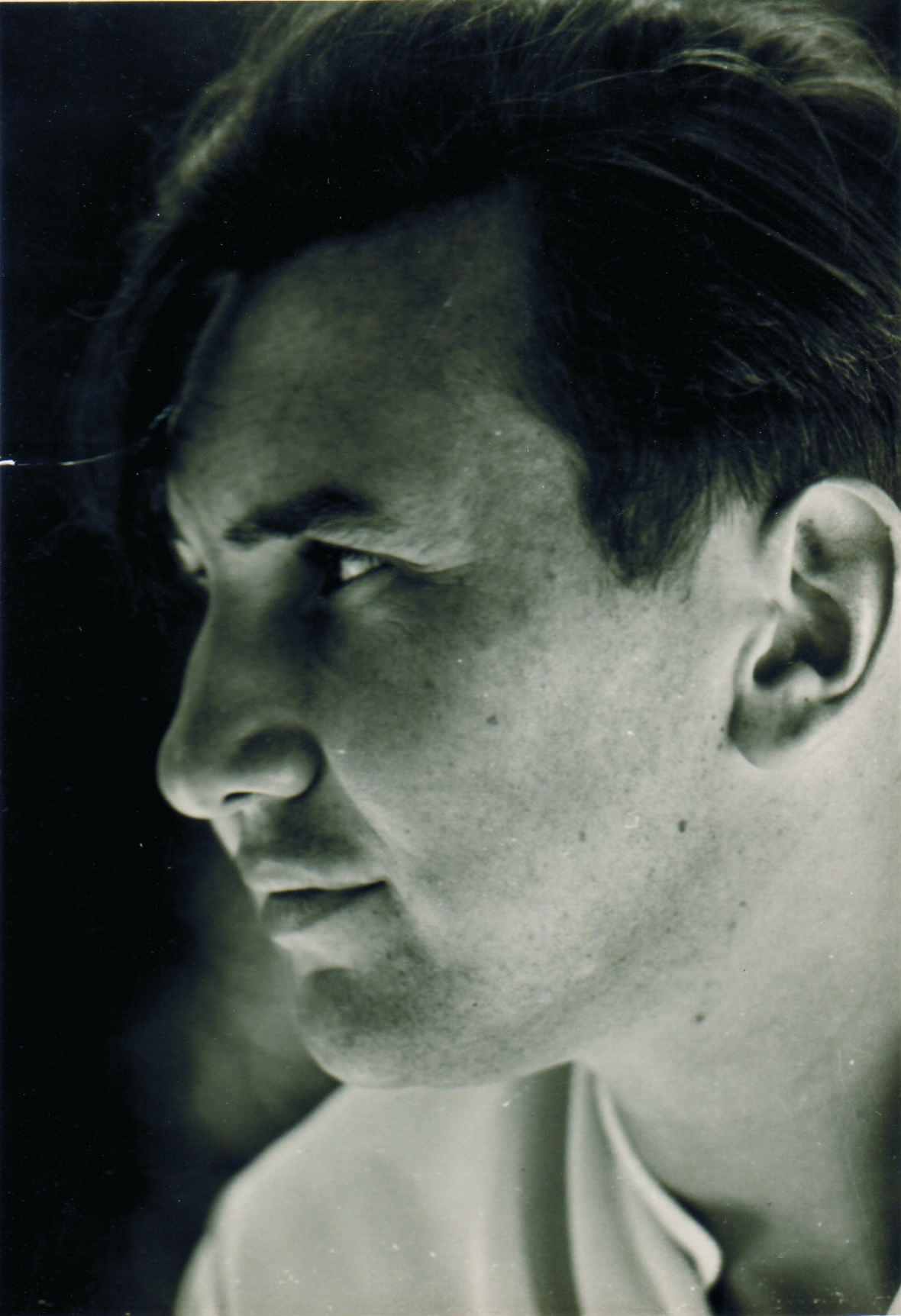
Panitz in 1962

- 1956 Jugendbuchpreis of the GDR
- 1967 Erich Weinert Medal
- 1971 Heinrich Greif Prize
- 1973 Literature Prize of the Democratic Women's League of Germany
- 1975 Heinrich Mann Prize
- 1976 Heinrich Greif Prize
- 1977 Nationalpreis der DDR
- 1982 Goethe Prize of East Berlin
- 1984 Art Prize of the Free German Trade Union Federation
- 1985 Vaterländischer Verdienstorden of the GDR

== Work ==
=== Books ===
- Käte. Berlin 1955.
- In drei Teufels Namen. Berlin 1958.
- Flucht. Berlin 1956.
- Die Feuer sinken. Berlin 1960, Schkeuditz 2000 ISBN 3-9806705-3-8
- Das Mädchen Simra. Halle 1961.
- Das Gesicht einer Mutter. Halle 1962.
- Cristobal und die Insel Berlin 1963.
- Der siebente Sommer. Halle 1967
- Unter den Bäumen regnet es zweimal. Halle 1969
- Die sieben Affären der Doña Juanita. Halle 1972
- Der Weg zum Rio Grande. Berlin 1973.
- Die unheilige Sophia. Halle 1974, 2007 ISBN 978-3-939828-08-2.
- Absage an Viktoria. Halle (Saale) 1975.
- Gesichter Vietnams. Berlin 1978 (Photos: Thomas Billhardt)
- Meines Vaters Straßenbahn. Halle 1979, Dresden 1996
- Die verlorene Tochter. Halle (Saale) 1979.
- Mein lieber Onkel Hans. Halle 1982
- Eiszeit. Halle (Saale) 1983
- Leben für Leben. Halle 1987
- Das Lächeln des Herrn O. Berlin 1994.
- Comandante Che, Berlin 1997.
- Cuba, mi amor. Berlin 2004.
- Der geheime Rotbannerorden. Böklund 2006, ISBN 3-939828-04-1.
- Dresdner Novelle 1989. verlag am park in der edition ost, Berlin 2009, ISBN 978-3-89793-232-6.
- Geheimtreff Banbury – Wie die Atombombe zu den Russen kam. 2nd edition. Das Neue Berlin, Berlin 2009, ISBN 978-3-360-01977-6.
- Tagebuch der totgesagten Dichter. verlag am park in der edition ost, Berlin 2013, ISBN 978-3-89793-300-2
- Das Trümmerhaus der Träume. verlag am park in der edition ost, Berlin 2015, ISBN 978-3-945187-20-3
- Frau im Dämmerlicht. verlag am park in der edition ost, Berlin 2016, ISBN 978-3-945187-57-9.
- Eiszeit. Eine unwirkliche Geschichte, revised 2016, Verlag Wiljo Heinen, Berlin/Böklund 2016, ISBN 978-3-95514-028-1.

=== Filmography ===
Panitz worked for films, sometimes writing the literary base, sometimes also the script. Films included:

- 1967: Der Revolver des Corporals, literary base
- 1970: Netzwerk, scenario with director Ralf Kirsten
- 1972: Der Dritte (Her Third), literary basis, director: Egon Günther
- 1972/73: Die sieben Affären der Doña Juanita (television film in four episodes based on his novel)
- 1974/75: Die unheilige Sophia, literary base, script with Manfred Wekwerth, director: Wekwerth
- 1976: Absage an Viktoria, literary base, script, director: Celino Bleiweiß
- 1980: Meines Vaters Straßenbahn, literary base, script, director: Celino Bleiweiß
- 1983 to 1985: Mein lieber Onkel Hans, literary base, director: Dagmar Wittmers
