= The Best of Divine =

Compilation album by Divine
- Released: 1991
- Recorded: prior to 1988
- Genre: dance/club

Divine chronology
The Originals and the Remixes (1996)	The Best of Divine (1991)

The Best of Divine is a best-of compilation album by Divine, issued in 1991. It followed The Originals and the Remixes the prior year, but has not been followed by any other albums since, making it the last of six posthumous Divine albums.

== Track listing ==
1. Shoot Your Shot - 6:27
2. Jungle Jezebel - 4:43
3. Native Love (Step By Step) - 3:59
4. Love Reaction - 5:36
5. Shout It Out - 3:23
6. T-Shirts and Tight Blue Jeans - 3:59
7. Psychedelic Shack - 3:38
8. Shake It Up - 5:51
9. Kick Your Butt - 5:26
10. Alphabet Rap - 6:02
11. You Think You're a Man - 6:04
12. Walk Like a Man - 5:27
13. I'm So Beautiful - 5:58
14. Hey You! - 5:38
