= Alan Eichler =

American theatrical producer (born 1944)

Alan Eichler (born July 17, 1944) is an American theatrical producer, talent manager and press agent who has represented several stage productions, produced Grammy-winning record albums and managed singers including Anita O'Day, Hadda Brooks, Nellie Lutcher, Ruth Brown, Johnnie Ray and Yma Sumac. He is a cousin of California architect Joseph Eichler and nephew of writer Lillian Eichler Watson and advertising executive/novelist Alfred Eichler.

== Early life and career ==
Born in Elmhurst, Queens, New York, United States, Eichler began his career in the mailroom as an apprentice to publicist Lee Solters in 1963, and worked his way up to account executive at Solters' firm Solters, O'Rourke and Sabinson. Following admission to the Association of Theatrical Press Agents and Managers union in 1969, he worked as publicist on the original productions of Hello, Dolly!, George M! and Hair. He also promoted several major off-Broadway hits including Paul Zindel's Pulitzer Prize-winning The Effect of Gamma Rays on Man-in-the-Moon Marigolds, the Elaine May-Terrence McNally double-bill "Adaptation/Next" with James Coco, Harold Pinter's The Tea Party and The Basement, the long-running rock musical Your Own Thing, Andre Gregory's experimental adaptation of Alice in Wonderland, and Tom Stoppard's The Real Inspector Hound. Eichler also represented several noteworthy "flops" during this period including Shelley Winters' only attempt at playwriting, One Night Stands of a Noisy Passenger with Robert De Niro, Sally Kirkland and Diane Ladd; Tina Howe's The Nest with Jill Clayburgh; Leland Hayward's last production The Mother Lover with Eileen Heckart; The Dozens with Morgan Freeman, Al Freeman Jr., and Paula Kelly (actress); and Larry Kramer's Four Friends with Brad Davis.

== Later theatrical work and productions ==
In 1970, he began a long association with playwright Tom Eyen, starting with The Dirtiest Show in Town and continuing with the prison comedy Women Behind Bars (which Eichler also co-produced), The Neon Woman starring Divine, Why Hanna's Skirt Won't Stay Down with Helen Hanft, The White Whore and the Bit Player, and the Tony Award-winning musical Dreamgirls. He also worked with actor-director-playwright Charles Ludlam and helped establish Ludlam's Ridiculous Theatrical Company as one of the major forces of New York's avant-garde theatre, with such cult hits as Camille (performed by Ludlam in drag), Bluebeard, Stage Blood, Hot Ice, and the cabaret play The Ventriloquist's Wife. In 1974, he became co-producer with Geraldine Fitzgerald of her one-woman musical show Streetsongs, which had three separate extended theatrical runs over the next several years both on and off-Broadway, a TV version on PBS and an original cast record album. He also represented Fitzgerald for all of her other ventures for the rest of her stage and film career. He helped steer the course of an unusual 1975 rock opera entitled The Lieutenant, based on the My Lai Massacre, which began as a small workshop production at the Queens Theatre in the Park, before traveling to Broadway. It only managed to run for nine performances, but was nominated for four Tony Awards including Best Musical and Best Actor in a Musical (Eddie Mekka).

He promoted the 1976 Jerry Rubin self-help book Growing Up at Thirty-Seven. In 1978, he was associate producer of the Broadway musical Timbuktu!, an African-American adaptation of the Chet Forrest-Robert Wright musical Kismet, starring Eartha Kitt, Melba Moore and Gilbert Price. He also toured with the show for two years as press agent and continued to have a long association with Kitt. He next publicized the Broadway production of Martin Sherman's play Bent with Richard Gere. In 1980, he began a year-long tour as press agent with the first national company of The Best Little Whorehouse in Texas starring Alexis Smith, following which he settled in Los Angeles. He arranged the first AIDS benefit for APLA Health in 1983, which was a midnight performance of Women Behind Bars at the Roxy Theatre (West Hollywood). In 1994, he produced an original musical, Swanson on Sunset, about the attempts of Gloria Swanson to create a musical version of her film hit Sunset Boulevard, with writer Dickson Hughes and actor Richard Stapley. It played an extended engagement at the Hollywood Roosevelt Hotel Cinegrill.

== Music and management ==
Eichler shifted his focus to music and helped establish several jazz clubs and cabarets including the Hollywood Roosevelt Hotel's Cinegrill, the Oak Room at Perino's, the Westwood Marquis and the Vine St. Bar and Grill, where he also helped produce a series of live albums featuring Nina Simone, Joe Williams, Marlena Shaw, Etta James, Maxine Sullivan, Annie Ross, and LaVern Baker. In 1986, he produced all-star benefit shows at the Vine Street Bar and Grill that raised money to obtain a star on the Hollywood Walk of Fame for Billie Holiday.

He helped restore the careers of Anita O'Day (who he managed for 25 years), Yma Sumac (who he managed for more than 20 years and launched on a new international career), Ruth Brown (who won a Tony, a Grammy Award and was inducted into the Rock and Roll Hall of Fame), Johnnie Ray, Helen Forrest, Ella Mae Morse, Thelma Carpenter (including her Broadway run in Hello, Dolly! and her movie debut in The Wiz), Monica Lewis, Roberta Sherwood, Maxine Sullivan, Jimmy Scott, Dolly Dawn, and Maxene Andrews of the Andrews Sisters (who he launched on a successful solo career in 1979). He brought Hadda Brooks out of a 16-year retirement, and signed her to DRG Records and Virgin Records.

In 1983, Eichler created original cabaret acts for veteran film stars Vivian Blaine and Virginia O'Brien. Also in 1983, he launched Mamie Van Doren on a new career as a disco recording star. He helped Knots Landing co-star Larry Riley launch a singing career in 1988, and produced the actor's tribute-show to Louis Jordan, Let the Good Times Roll. Eichler promoted the 50th anniversary concert by client Patti Page at Carnegie Hall in 1997 and arranged the release of the live recording, which earned Page her first Grammy. He co-produced Ruth Brown's Grammy Award-winning album Blues on Broadway. He helped O'Day recover from a long illness in 1999, and arranged for her comeback concert at New York's Avery Fisher Hall.

Eichler was instrumental in arranging LaVern Baker's return to the US after a 20-year absence, and obtained two new album deals for her with Rhino Records and DRG Records. He also promoted comeback concerts for Joni James, at New York's Town Hall, Avery Fisher Hall and Carnegie Hall, as well as the Academy of Television Arts and Sciences Theatre in Los Angeles and the Academy of Music in Philadelphia, where she was backed by the Count Basie Orchestra. He created and produced the show Voices—Hollywood's Secret Singing Stars, featuring four vocalists (Annette Warren, India Adams, Betty Wand and Jo Ann Greer).

He managed jazz singer Jane Harvey and in 2010 produced a five-CD retrospective collection of recordings from her six-decade career, including unreleased titles she had recorded with Duke Ellington, Les Paul and Les Elgart.

== Later activity ==
In 2020, he co-produced a stage revival of Women Behind Bars at the Ricardo Montalban Theatre in Hollywood, which was also filmed and streamed on Broadway HD. He is executive producer of a documentary film, Boulevard!, about Gloria Swanson's failed attempt to turn Sunset Boulevard into a musical. In addition, he is executor producer of the documentary film Studio One Forever, about the famous Hollywood dance club of the 1970s and 1980s. As of 2026, he was completing a documentary on actress Mamie Van Doren. He also executive produced the documentary Mineshsaft: The Cruising Murders and the forthcoming Philippine film Love and Lockdown. He has also compiled and annotated several CDs for Fresh Sound Records, Sepia Records, Real Gone Music, and Jasmine Records, by such artists as Sophie Tucker, Patti Page, Jill Corey, Peggy King, Roberta Sherwood, Louis Prima, Lily Ann Carol, Ketty Lester, Joanie Sommers, Lola Dee, De Castro Sisters, Margie Rayburn, Betty Johnson, Ann Miller, Blossom Seeley, Freddy Cole, Maria Cole, Ike Cole, Eddie Cole, Thelma Carpenter, Kitty White, June Richmond, Janette Davis, the Mary Kaye Trio, Harold Nicholas, Dorothy Dandridge, Tony Perkins, Mimi Martel, Ella Logan, and Judy Canova. He executive produced two new albums by singer-pianist Betty Bryant, Lotta Livin and Nothin' Better to Do, and the album Strange Meadowlark by Mark Christian Miller.
