= One More Chance (Pet Shop Boys song) =

1984 single by Pet Shop Boys

- Belgian 12-inch single cover

Single by Pet Shop Boys
- B-side: "Theme for the Pet Shop Boys Pt II"
- Released: June 1984; 1986 (reissue); 1988 (German reissue)
- Recorded: 1984
- Studio: Sugar Hill Studio (Englewood, New Jersey)
- Genre: Synth-pop
- Length: 3:26 (Kordak mix); 5:33 (Bobby "O" mix); 3:25 (7" Hurricane mix); 5:00 (12" Hurricane mix)
- Label: Bobcat (US); ChanneL (Belgium); Planet (Sweden); ZYX (Germany); Unidisc (Canada)
- Songwriter(s): Neil Tennant; Bobby Orlando
- Producer(s): Bobby Orlando

Pet Shop Boys singles chronology
"West End Girls" (1984)	"One More Chance" (1984)	"Opportunities (Let's Make Lots of Money)" (1985)

"One More Chance"

Song by Pet Shop Boys

from the album Actually
- Released: 7 September 1987
- Studio: Sarm West (London)
- Genre: Synth-pop
- Length: 5:30 (album version); 3:49 (7" mix)
- Label: EMI Manhattan / Parlophone
- Songwriter(s): Neil Tennant; Chris Lowe; Bobby Orlando
- Producer(s): Julian Mendelsohn

"One More Chance" is a song by English synth-pop duo Pet Shop Boys, first released as their second single in 1984 and re-recorded for their second album Actually in 1987. The track was originally credited to Neil Tennant and producer Bobby Orlando before Chris Lowe wrote additional music for the album version.

== Composition and recording ==
"One More Chance" was based on an unused backing track that Bobby Orlando had recorded for the actor/singer Divine, provisionally titled "Rock Me". Tennant wrote lyrics for the song exploring the theme of 'romantic paranoia' while in New York City. He envisioned the setting as "New York on one of those horrible cold December nights with the wind whistling out of the river". The 1984 single was recorded at Sugar Hill Studio in Englewood, New Jersey.

The 1987 re-recording was produced by Julian Mendelsohn at Sarm West. Fairlight programmer Andy Richards contributed to the track and suggested adding a middle section. Lowe wrote the chords, and Tennant added the lyrics "You're so extreme / I want to take you home with me..." A car crash sample was included, similar to "I Want a Lover" from Please (1986). The track also featured sleigh bells and a repeated vocalisation that Tennant compared to a cartoon character like Woody Woodpecker.

== Release ==
The Bobby Orlando production was released on 12-inch vinyl in the US by Bobcat Records; in Germany, Belgium and Canada by ZYX Records, ChanneL Records and Unidisc respectively; and on 7-inch vinyl in Sweden by Planet Records. One of the two US singles included an early version of "West End Girls", later their breakthrough single in 1985. The Canadian release featured tracks by Girly and Divine.

For Actually in 1987, a standard 7-inch version was made and was intended for release as a single, but Pet Shop Boys were dissatisfied with the mix so Mendelsohn produced a 12-inch remix that was used on the album. A single was not released. The unused 7-inch mix was included on the second disc of Actually: Further Listening 1987–1988 in 2001.

=== Artwork ===
The cover photos for the single releases were taken by Eric Watson. The German 12-inch used the same photograph as the original "West End Girls", taken in August 1983, showing Lowe and Tennant in white T-shirts with a band of light across their eyes. The Belgian version (pictured) featured Tennant sitting on a set of speakers and Lowe lounging on the ground, both wearing Nike brand anoraks. The typography was created by the duo and also appeared on both versions of "West End Girls".

== Critical reception ==
Lee Carter of The Hard Report called the song "the best Pet Shop Boys track I've heard since 'West End Girls'". Connie Johnson of the Los Angeles Times gave an overall negative review to Actually apart from "It's a Sin", adding: "'One More Chance', the album's only other interesting track, is not bad. Even if it does sound like 'Son of West End Girls'". A retrospective look at Actually by Mark Elliott of Dig! said the album opener "perfectly established Actually's tone: intelligent pop-dance where melody and mood demands as much attention as the beat."

== Live performances ==
"One More Chance" was on the setlist of the Pet Shop Boys' first live performance at The Fridge in Brixton in 1984. On 5 June 1988, they played "One More Chance" and "It's a Sin" at a benefit organized by Ian McKellen at the Piccadilly Theatre opposing the anti-homosexuality law Section 28.

When they embarked on their first tour in 1989, "One More Chance" was staged with the ensemble performing a West Side Story-style choreography against a backdrop of black-and-white images of New York City. The song was revived on the Electric Tour in 2013–2015, paired with "A Face Like That" from Elysium (2012).

== Usage in other media ==
"One More Chance" is featured in the Pet Shop Boys film It Couldn't Happen Here (1988), which ends with the duo performing the song to a crowd of dancers in a nightclub.

== Track listings ==
=== United States 12-inch ===
1. "One More Chance" (Kordak remix) – 3:26
2. "One More Chance" (remix) – 5:33

=== United States two-song 12-inch ===
1. "One More Chance" – 3:26
2. "West End Girls" – 7:50

=== Belgian 12-inch ===
1. "One More Chance" (remix) – 5:33
2. "One More Chance" – (3:26)

=== German 12-inch ===
1. "One More Chance" (Kordak mix) – 3:26
2. "One More Chance" (Bobby O remix) – 5:33

=== Swedish 7-inch ===
1. "One More Chance" – 3:30
2. "One More Chance" (remix) – 5:37

=== Canadian 12-inch ===
1. "One More Chance" – 5:34
2. "Working Girl (One Way Love Affair)" (by Girly) – 5:10
3. "Love Reaction" (by Divine) – 5:31

=== German 1986 7-inch ===
1. "One More Chance" (Hurricane mix) – 3:25
2. "Theme for the Pet Shop Boys Pt II" – 3:40

=== German 1986 12-inch (reissued 1988 on 12-inch and mini CD) ===
1. "One More Chance" (Hurricane mix) – 5:00
2. "Theme for the Pet Shop Boys Pt II" – 5:03
