= Maid in England =

Compilation album by Divine
- Released: 1988
- Genre: Hi-NRG
- Label: Bellaphon
- Producer: Barry Evangeli; Colin Peter; Nick Titchener; Pete Waterman; Ian Penman

Divine chronology
| The Story So Far (1984) | Maid in England (1988) |

Maid in England is an album by the American drag queen Divine. It contains 12 songs. The album's first three singles, "Walk Like a Man", "Twistin' the Night Away" and "Hard Magic", all charted in the UK.

== Critical reception ==
Reviewing the album's re-release for Louder Than War, Phil Newall wrote that "all the expected Hi-NRG characteristics are present, frantic syncopated beats, massed male backing vocals insistent keyboard melodies", concluding that "what lifts Divine from the ranks of Hi-NRG masses are the growled vocals and the knowledge that Divine actually lived a counter culture life style as opposed to just singing about it."

== Track listing ==
Side one
| No. | Title | Writer(s) | Length |
|---|---|---|---|
| 1. | "Divine's Theme" | Colin Peter; Ian Penman; Nick Titchener | 2:10 |
| 2. | "You Think You're a Man" | Geoffrey Deane | 6:59 |
| 3. | "Give It Up" | Paul Klein; Philip Walsh | 2:45 |
| 4. | "I'm So Beautiful" | Mike Stock; Matt Aitken | 7:08 |
| 5. | "Show Me Around" | Philip Walsh | 3:17 |
| 6. | "Walk Like a Man" (Remix) | Bob Crewe; Bob Gaudio | 5:27 |

Side two
| No. | Title | Writer(s) | Length |
|---|---|---|---|
| 7. | "Twistin' the Night Away" (Remix) | Sam Cooke | 5:34 |
| 8. | "Good Time '88" | Colin Peter; Nick Titchener | 3:45 |
| 9. | "Hard Magic" (Magic Mix) | Mick Flinn; Nick Titchener; Pete Ware; Peter Morris | 3:22 |
| 10. | "Little Baby" (Remix) | Bruce Woolley; Richard Underwood | 6:15 |
| 11. | "Hey You!" (Remix) | Francis Usmar; Steve Johnston | 5:42 |
| 12. | "Divine Reprise" | Colin Peter; Ian Penman | 0:56 |
| 13. | "Hey You" (The Trumpet Mix) | | 5:40 |
| Total length: | | | 59:00 |
