= The Story So Far (Divine album) =

1984 album by Divine

Compilation album by Divine
- Released: 1984
- Recorded: 1982 and 1984
- Genre: Hi-NRG
- Labels: Bellaphon (GER) - (260-07-075); Proto (UK) - (PROTO 3)
- Producers: Mike Stock, Matt Aitken, Pete Waterman, Bobby Orlando

Divine chronology
My First Album (1982)	The Story So Far (1984)	Maid in England (1988)

Professional ratings
Review scores
Source	Rating
AllMusic	4/5 stars

The Story So Far is a compilation album by American performance artist Divine, originally released in 1984. It is Divine's most successful album on both sides of the Atlantic.

With songwriting and music production by Mike Stock, Matt Aitken, and Pete Waterman (collectively known as Stock Aitken Waterman), as well as Bobby Orlando, the album became especially sought after by avid synthesizer-based club/dance music fans. The album includes the hit single "You Think You're a Man", which reached number 16 on the UK Singles Chart.

== Track listing ==
Side one
No.	Title	Writer(s)	Source	Length
1.	"I'm So Beautiful"	Mike Stock / Matt Aitken	Single A-side (1984)	7:51
2.	"Native Love (Step by Step)"	Bobby Orlando	From My First Album/Jungle Jezebel (1982)	3:36
3.	"You Think You're a Man"	Geoffrey Deane	Single A-side (1984)	8:07
4.	"Shake It Up"	Orlando	Single A-side (1983)	3:18

Side two
No.	Title	Writer(s)	Source	Length
1.	"Shoot Your Shot"	Orlando	From My First Album	6:24
2.	"Love Reaction"	Orlando	Single A-side (1983)	5:32
3.	"Jungle Jezebel"	Orlando	From My First Album	4:42
4.	"Alphabet Rap"	Orlando	From My First Album	5:47

== Notes ==
- The 1988 Receiver Records CD reissue omits the Stock Aitken Waterman produced tracks, namely "I'm So Beautiful" and "You Think You're a Man."
