= Ron Link (director) =

American theatre director

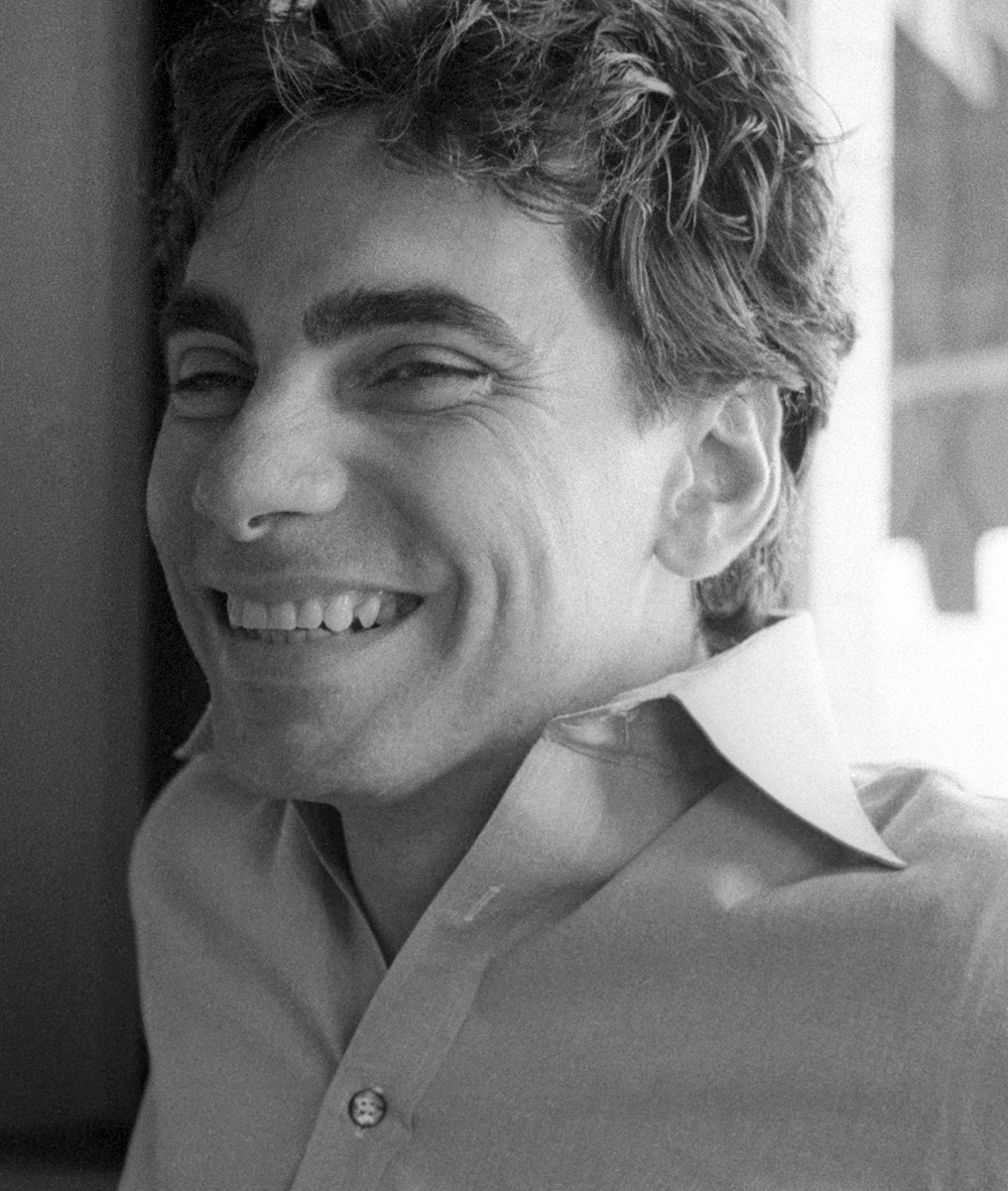

Ron Link (born in Columbus, Ohio in 1940 – June 7, 1999) was an American theatre director.

Link directed off-off-Broadway theatre, working primarily at Caffe Cino and La MaMa Experimental Theatre Club on the Lower East Side of Manhattan. He directed a young Robert De Niro in Glamour, Glory and Gold and a young Sylvester Stallone in Somerset Maugham's Rain. He also directed Divine in Tom Eyen's Women Behind Bars at La MaMa and at the Astor Place Theater in 1974, and in The Neon Woman at Hurrah in 1978.

After moving to Los Angeles, he directed Stand-Up Tragedy and Bouncers.
