= Dancin' Madly Backwards =

Single by The Flirts

from the album Made in America
- Released: 1985
- Genre: Hi-NRG
- Songwriter: C. Shore
- Producers: Bobby Orlando, Jürgen Korduletsch, Don Oriolo

The Flirts singles chronology
"Helpless (You Took My Love)" (1984)	"Dancin' Madly Backwards" (1985)	"You & Me" (1985)

Audio
- "Dancin' Madly Backwards" on YouTube

"Dancin' Madly Backwards" (or "Dancing Madly Backwards") is a 1984 or 1985 single by The Flirts, a New York-based female vocal trio created by producer/songwriter Bobby Orlando.

== Composition ==
The song was written by C. Shore and produced by Bobby Orlando, Jürgen Korduletsch and Don Oriolo.

== Charts ==
Chart (1985)	Peak position
Germany (GfK)	46
US Dance Club Songs (Billboard)	47

== In popular culture ==
The song was used in the 1986 Canadian feature film Flying.
