= My First Album =

My First Album may refer to:

- My First Album (Divine album), 1982
- My First Album (Lolly album), 1999
- My First Album (Peppa Pig album), 2019
- My First Album (Jessica Winter album), 2025
- Born to Be (Melanie album), the 1968 debut album by Melanie, later reissued as My First Album
