= Actually =

1987 Pet Shop Boys album

Studio album by Pet Shop Boys
- Released: 7 September 1987
- Recorded: 1986–1987
- Studios: Sarm West and Advision (London)
- Genres: Synth-pop; electropop; dance-pop
- Length: 47:52
- Label: Parlophone
- Producers: Stephen Hague; David Jacob; Julian Mendelsohn; Pet Shop Boys; Shep Pettibone; Andy Richards

Pet Shop Boys chronology
Disco (1986)	Actually (1987)	Introspective (1988)

Singles from Actually
- 1. "It's a Sin" Released: 15 June 1987; 2. "What Have I Done to Deserve This?" Released: 10 August 1987; 3. "Rent" Released: 12 October 1987; 4. "Heart" Released: 21 March 1988

Actually (stylised as Pet Shop Boys, actually.) is the second studio album by English synth-pop duo Pet Shop Boys, released on 7 September 1987 by Parlophone in the United Kingdom and by EMI Manhattan in North America. The album features two number one singles, "It's a Sin" and "Heart", and a duet with Dusty Springfield, "What Have I Done to Deserve This?" Actually is the Pet Shop Boys' top-selling album in the UK, certified triple platinum with over one million sales; worldwide it has sold over four million copies.

== Background and recording ==
For their second album, Pet Shop Boys still had material from their early songwriting days, including "It's a Sin" (1982), "Rent" (1984), and "One More Chance" which they had recorded with Bobby Orlando and released as an unsuccessful single outside the UK in 1984. "What Have I Done to Deserve This?" was a collaboration with songwriter Allee Willis, suggested by their manager Tom Watkins; they had hoped to include it on Please (1986) but had to wait for a response from Dusty Springfield.

The duo also wrote new material. "Hit Music" was inspired by the Henry Mancini theme song "Peter Gunn" covered by Art of Noise. The music for "I Want to Wake Up" was written by Chris Lowe; the lyrics added by Neil Tennant compare unrequited love to a bad dream, mentioning the songs "Tainted Love" and "Love Is Strange". The chart-topper "Heart" was a song they considered giving to Madonna as well as Hazell Dean, but ultimately the duo decided to keep for themselves.

"Shopping" began as a joke about spelling out the word as they were shopping, but the lyrics took a turn about the privatisation of national industries under Margaret Thatcher. The "Tell Sid" advertisements for British Gas, encouraging people to buy shares in the company, were a particular source of inspiration.

Composer Ennio Morricone shares a songwriting credit on "It Couldn't Happen Here". Pet Shop Boys had contacted Morricone about writing a string arrangement for their song "Jealousy", but instead he sent them an Italian song to work with. Pet Shop Boys used the music from the chorus of Morricone's song and wrote a new verse, with Lowe adding chord changes. Angelo Badalamenti contributed an arrangement which was programmed into a Fairlight by Blue Weaver in lieu of an orchestra. The title "It Couldn't Happen Here" refers to an early belief, discussed by Tennant and his friend Christopher Dowell, that AIDS would not greatly impact the UK. By the time Tennant wrote the lyrics, Dowell had been diagnosed with the disease; he died two years later.

The last track on the album, "King's Cross", depicts the area around King's Cross station in London, which at the time was a destination for drug addicts, prostitutes, and the homeless, as well as people coming by train from northern England and Scotland seeking opportunities. According to Tennant, "It's an angry song about Thatcherism. Mrs Thatcher came in on the promise of firm government and I'm interpreting 'the smack of firm government' literally as hitting someone. That's what firm government tends to mean—you hit the weakest person, the man at the back of the queue". With this and songs like "Shopping" and "It Couldn't Happen Here", Tennant noted that Actually can be taken loosely as a critique of Thatcherism.

Actually was recorded at Sarm Studios and Advision Studios. On the album Pet Shop Boys worked with several producers, including Julian Mendelsohn and Stephen Hague. Mendelsohn produced and engineered half of the album's ten tracks, including the lead single and UK number one "It's a Sin", while Hague, who had produced the duo's previous album Please, this time only produced a few tracks, including "What Have I Done to Deserve This?", and mixed "It's a Sin". "Heart", which went on to became a UK number one single, was produced by Andy Richards and mixed by Mendelsohn. Wanting to keep everything fresh and not lose perspective, the production method was usually to work only a few hours at the time on each track and then switch to another.

== Music ==
Actually is considered a synth-pop album. According to Matt Mitchell of Paste Magazine, Pet Shop Boys "went absolutely bonkers mad" on the album.

== Album cover ==
The album cover was originally going to feature a painting by Scottish artist Alison Watt, who had just won the National Portrait Gallery-supported John Player Portrait Award. The group travelled to Glasgow, along with photographer Eric Watson and designer Mark Farrow, to meet her. Sittings for the painting would have taken three weeks, so instead photos were taken of the duo in different poses. After a few weeks, Watt submitted the painting, but Lowe was unhappy with how he looked in it. The painting was reworked and although Tennant was pleased with it, Lowe still had reservations. It was decided that the painting was not right for the album and it was shelved. The painting was bought by Tennant.

While shooting the video for "What Have I Done to Deserve This?", photographer Cindy Palmano was commissioned to take photographs of them for a Smash Hits cover. She placed them in front of a waist-high piece of reflective metal, with a similar sheet behind them. The photo where Tennant is yawning and Lowe is scowling was the favourite and Smash Hits were keen to use it as a front cover. Eric Watson then took some photos, but it was thought these were not strong enough for the album cover, so they were used for the inner sleeve. The group then decided that Palmano's photo was the best choice. The issue of Smash Hits was due to go to press the following day. They persuaded the magazine to release Palmano's photograph and agreed to do a hastily arranged photo session for them.

Inspired by Jean-Paul Goude's design for Grace Jones album Slave to the Rhythm, Mark Farrow tightly cropped the photo to remove the reflective background and just have the duo on a plain white background. Chris Lowe was, and remains, unhappy with the cover. However it has come to be seen as the defining image of them.

== Release and promotion ==
Actually was released on 7 September 1987, debuting at number two on the UK Albums Chart behind Michael Jackson's Bad. It was in the top 40 for 42 consecutive weeks, with 15 weeks in the top 10. It is the only Pet Shop Boys album to be certified triple platinum by BPI. Actually was also certified platinum in seven other countries, including Germany where sales exceeded 500,000 (see Certifications and sales). In the United States, Actually peaked at number 25 and spent 45 weeks on the Billboard 200, selling over 750,000 copies with a gold certification.

Actually produced four UK top 10 singles: the number-one single "It's a Sin", "Rent", "What Have I Done to Deserve This?"—which peaked at number two in both the UK and US and led to a resurgence of interest in Dusty Springfield's earlier work—and another UK number one in April 1988 with a remixed version of the song "Heart".

In television commercials for the release, Lowe and Tennant were shown in black tie, blank-faced against a white background. The former seems unimpressed by a radio DJ-style Alan 'Fluff' Freeman voiceover listing their previous hits and new singles from Actually, while the latter eventually "gets bored" and yawns, with the image then freezing to create, roughly, the album's cover shot.

During this period Pet Shop Boys also completed a full-length motion picture called It Couldn't Happen Here. Featuring songs by the duo, it was most famous for containing the video for "Always on My Mind" (starring Joss Ackland as a blind priest), which—while not on Actually—was released as a single during this period.

Actually was re-released in 2001 as Actually: Further Listening 1987–1988. The new version was digitally remastered and came with a second disc of B-sides and previously unreleased material from around the time of the album's original release. A remastered single-disc edition of Actually, containing only the 10 original tracks, was released in 2009. In 2018, a newly remastered edition of Actually: Further Listening 1987–1988 was released, with the same contents as the 2001 edition.

== Critical reception ==
Professional ratings
Review scores
Source	Rating
AllMusic	4.5/5 stars
Los Angeles Times	2.5/4 stars
Mojo	4/5 stars
Q	4/5 stars
Record Mirror	3/5
The Rolling Stone Album Guide	4/5 stars
Sounds	4/5 stars
Spin Alternative Record Guide	9/10
Uncut	8/10
The Village Voice	A−

Actually was generally well received by critics. At the time of its release, Chris White of Music Week said Actually was "well worth the wait with the duo coming up with another highly original and distinctive-sounding album" and called it a "great pop album which will deservedly be one of the year's biggest sellers". In December 1987, Robert Christgau of The Village Voice praised it as "actual pop music with something actual to say—pure commodity, and proud of it." In his retrospective review, Stephen Thomas Erlewine of AllMusic said that Actually is the album where "the Pet Shop Boys perfected their melodic, detached dance-pop."

Actually is featured in the 2005 musical reference book 1001 Albums You Must Hear Before You Die, and has been recognised in various other "must-listen" lists. In 2006, Q magazine included Actually in its list of the "40 Best Albums of the '80s" at number 22. In 2012, Slant Magazine ranked the record at number 88 on its list of the "100 Best Albums of the 1980s". In 2020, Rolling Stone placed Actually at number 435 on its list of the "500 Greatest Albums of All Time".

== Usage in other media ==
Although not released as a single, the track "Shopping" is frequently featured as background music in British television news and current affairs programmes dealing with retail business issues and as bumper music on home shopping shows. This is despite the fact that the song is actually a critique of privatisation in 1980s Britain, and has little to do with actual shopping. "Shopping" was also used in a series 1 episode of the Disney Channel television series Lizzie McGuire. A more appropriate use of "Shopping" is in the fourth episode of Andrew Marr's History of Modern Britain, dealing with privatisation and deregulation.

"King's Cross" served in the Japanese media as a commercial song for the Aurex's (owned by Toshiba) cassette tape recorder model XDR. The album is featured in the preview of Naughty Dog's game Intergalactic: The Heretic Prophet.

== Track listing ==
All tracks are written by Neil Tennant and Chris Lowe, except where noted.

Side one
No.	Title	Writer(s)	Producer(s)	Length
1.	"One More Chance"	Tennant; Lowe; Bobby Orlando	Julian Mendelsohn	5:30
2.	"What Have I Done to Deserve This?" (with Dusty Springfield)	Tennant; Lowe; Allee Willis	Stephen Hague	4:18
3.	"Shopping"		Mendelsohn	3:37
4.	"Rent"		Mendelsohn	5:08
5.	"Hit Music"		Mendelsohn	4:44

Side two
No.	Title	Writer(s)	Producer(s)	Length
6.	"It Couldn't Happen Here"	Tennant; Lowe; Ennio Morricone	David Jacob; Pet Shop Boys	5:20
7.	"It's a Sin"		Mendelsohn	4:59
8.	"I Want to Wake Up"		Pet Shop Boys; Shep Pettibone	5:08
9.	"Heart"		Andy Richards; Pet Shop Boys	3:58
10.	"King's Cross"		Hague	5:10

Further Listening 1987–1988 (bonus disc)
No.	Title	Writer(s)	Length
1.	"I Want to Wake Up" (breakdown mix) (previously unreleased)		6:00
2.	"Heart" (Shep Pettibone version) (previously unreleased)		4:12
3.	"You Know Where You Went Wrong"		5:50
4.	"One More Chance" (seven-inch mix) (previously unreleased)		3:50
5.	"It's a Sin" (disco mix)		7:41
6.	"What Have I Done to Deserve This?" (extended mix)	Tennant; Lowe; Willis	6:47
7.	"Heart" (disco mix)		8:40
8.	"A New Life"	Lowe; Tennant; Helena Springs	4:55
9.	"Always on My Mind" (demo version) (previously unreleased on CD)	Wayne Carson Thompson; Mark James; Johnny Christopher	4:03
10.	"Rent" (seven-inch mix)		3:33
11.	"I Want a Dog"		4:58
12.	"Always on My Mind" (extended dance mix)	Thompson; James; Christopher	8:15
13.	"Do I Have To?"		5:15
14.	"Always on My Mind" (dub mix) (previously unreleased on CD)	Thompson; James; Christopher	2:15

== Personnel ==
Credits adapted from the liner notes of Actually: Further Listening 1987–1988.

=== Pet Shop Boys ===
- Neil Tennant
- Chris Lowe

=== Additional musicians ===
- Dusty Springfield – guest vocals (track 2)
- Andy Richards – Fairlight and keyboard programming (tracks 1, 4, 5, 7, 9)
- J. J. Jeczalik – Fairlight programming (track 3)
- Gary Maughan – additional programming (track 3)
- Angelo Badalamenti – orchestra arrangement (track 6)
- Blue Weaver – Fairlight programming (track 6)
- Adrien Cook – programming (track 8)

=== Technical ===
- Julian Mendelsohn – production, engineering (tracks 1, 3–5, 7); mixing (tracks 2, 9)
- Stephen Hague – production (tracks 2, 10); mixing, additional production (track 7)
- David Jacob – engineering (tracks 2, 6, 10); production (track 6); mix engineering (track 7)
- Pet Shop Boys – production (tracks 6, 8, 9)
- Shep Pettibone – production (track 8)
- Dave Meegan – engineering (track 8)
- Andy Richards – production (track 9)
- Tony Phillips – engineering (track 9)
- Tim Young – 2001 & 2018 remastering

=== Artwork ===
- Mark Farrow – design
- Pet Shop Boys – design
- Cindy Palmano – cover photograph
- Eric Watson – inner sleeve photograph

== Charts ==
=== Weekly charts ===
1987 weekly chart performance for Actually
Chart (1987)	Peak position
Australian Albums (Kent Music Report)	16
Austrian Albums (Ö3 Austria)	5
Canada Top Albums/CDs (RPM)	16
Dutch Albums (Album Top 100)	5
European Albums (Music & Media)	4
Finnish Albums (Suomen virallinen lista)	1
French Albums (IFOP)	19
German Albums (Offizielle Top 100)	2
Icelandic Albums (Tónlist)	1
Italian Albums (Musica e dischi)	12
New Zealand Albums (RMNZ)	7
Norwegian Albums (VG-lista)	3
Spanish Albums (AFYVE)	2
Swedish Albums (Sverigetopplistan)	2
Swiss Albums (Schweizer Hitparade)	3
UK Albums (Official Charts)	2
US Billboard 200	25

2018 weekly chart performance for Actually
Chart (2018)	Peak position
Hungarian Albums (MAHASZ)	37

=== Year-end charts ===
1987 year-end chart performance for Actually
Chart (1987)	Position
Australian Albums (Kent Music Report)	78
Canada Top Albums/CDs (RPM)	70
Dutch Albums (Album Top 100)	61
European Albums (Music & Media)	33
German Albums (Offizielle Top 100)	42
UK Albums (Gallup)	15

1988 year-end chart performance for Actually
Chart (1988)	Position
Austrian Albums (Ö3 Austria)	16
Canada Top Albums/CDs (RPM)	72
European Albums (Music & Media)	22
German Albums (Offizielle Top 100)	10
UK Albums (Gallup)	35

== Certifications and sales ==
Certifications and sales for Actually
Region	Certification	Certified units/sales
Austria (IFPI Austria)	Gold	25,000^{*}
Brazil	—	160,000
Canada (Music Canada)	Platinum	100,000^{^}
Finland (Musiikkituottajat)	Platinum	68,416
Germany (BVMI)	Platinum	500,000^{^}
Hong Kong (IFPI Hong Kong)	Platinum	20,000^{*}
Malaysia	—	15,000
New Zealand (RMNZ)	Platinum	15,000^{^}
Spain (Promusicae)	Platinum	100,000^{^}
Sweden (GLF)	Gold	50,000^{^}
Switzerland (IFPI Switzerland)	Platinum	50,000^{^}
United Kingdom (BPI)	3× Platinum	1,000,000
United States (RIAA)	Gold	750,000
Summaries
Worldwide	—	4,000,000
^{*} Sales figures based on certification alone.^{^} Shipments figures based on certification alone.

== See also ==
- List of 1980s albums considered the best
