= 10¢ a Dance =

Studio album by the Flirts
- Released: 1982
- Genre: Hi-NRG; new wave; dance-pop; post-disco
- Length: 30:41
- Label: "O"
- Producer: Bobby Orlando

The Flirts chronology
| 10¢ a Dance (1982) | Born to Flirt (1983) |

Singles from 10¢ a Dance
- 1. "Jukebox (Don't Put Another Dime)" Released: 1982; 2. "Passion" Released: 1982; 3. "On the Beach" Released: 1983; 4. "We Just Want to Dance" Released: 1983; 5. "Calling All Boys" Released: 1983

10¢ a Dance is the debut studio album by the Flirts, a New York-based female vocal trio formed by record producer and songwriter Bobby Orlando. The album was released in 1982 by "O" Records. In the Netherlands, it was retitled Passion.

The single "Passion" peaked at No. 4 in Germany and Switzerland, and was later released as a double A-sided single with "Calling All Boys", peaking at No. 21 on the U.S. Billboard Dance Club Songs chart.

== Critical reception ==
Professional ratings
Review scores
| Source | Rating |
|---|---|
| AllMusic | 4/5 stars |

In a retrospective review for AllMusic, critic Alex Henderson wrote of the album, "from power pop to dance-pop, 10 Cents a Dance is about as fun-loving as it gets."

== Track listing ==
All tracks are written by Bobby Orlando except where noted.

Side one
| No. | Title | Length |
|---|---|---|
| 1. | "Jukebox (Don't Put Another Dime)" | 3:42 |
| 2. | "Boy Crazy" | 3:10 |
| 3. | "On the Beach" | 3:02 |
| 4. | "Passion" | 3:37 |

| No. | Title | Writer(s) | Length |
|---|---|---|---|
| 5. | "We Just Want to Dance" | | 2:41 |
| 6. | "Calling All Boys" | | 4:34 |
| 7. | "Jungle Rock" | | 3:02 |
| 8. | "I Only Want to Be with You" | Mike Hawker; Ivor Raymonde | 2:23 |
| 9. | "Surf's Up" | | 3:07 |
| Total length: | | | 30:41 |

== Charts ==
| Chart (1983) | Peak position |
|---|---|
| Swedish Albums (Sverigetopplistan) | 39 |
