= Helen Hanft =

American actress

- Born: April 4, 1934; New York City, U.S.
- Died: May 30, 2013 (aged 79); New York City, U.S.
- Occupation: Actress
- Years active: 1960–2013

Helen Hanft (April 4, 1934 – May 30, 2013) was an American actress.

== Early life ==
Hanft was born in the Bronx, the eldest of three daughters born to Esther and Benjamin Hanft. Her father was a prominent public relations executive for several national Jewish organizations. Her father persuaded her to audition for the High School of Performing Arts, now part of Fiorello H. LaGuardia High School of Music & Art and Performing Arts, and she was admitted.

== Career ==
Hanft started her theatrical career in the early 1960s in the experimental theater movement at Off-Off-Broadway venues like La MaMa Experimental Theatre Club and Caffe Cino. She quickly became known as "the Ethel Merman of off-off-Broadway" for her comedic performances. Hanft often played eccentric, raunchy characters, and was featured in many plays by Tom Eyen, including:

- My Next Husband Will Be a Beauty! (1964)
- Frustrata (1964, 1965)
- The Demented World of Tom Eyen (1965)
- Why Hanna's Skirt Won't Stay Down (1965, 1971, 1981)
- The White Whore and the Bit Player (1965; she also appeared in the Cannon Films adaptation)
- Sarah B. Divine! (1967)
- Who Killed My Bald Sister Sophie? (1969)
- What is Making Gilda So Gray? (1970)
- Women Behind Bars (1975)
- The Neon Woman (1978; co-starring Divine)
- Give My Regards to Off Off Broadway (1987)
- Areatha in the Ice Palace

She performed in David Rabe's In the Boom Boom Room at Joseph Papp's Public Theater, John Patrick Shanley's Italian American Reconciliation, and multiple plays by Stephen Holt, including Reety in Hell. Hanft also appeared in the following productions at La MaMa during the 1960s and 1970s:

- Merrill Williams' At the Corner of Popcorn Alley and the 21st of September Street (1965)
- H.M. Koutoukas' Omy Queen of the Fairies and Tidy Passions, or, Kill Kaleidascope Kill (1965)
- Paul Foster's The Madonna in the Orchard (1966) directed by Tom O'Horgan
- Howard Greenberger and Robert Reinhold's Our Play on the Future Has No Name (1970)
- Stephen Holt's The Kitty Glitter Story (1974)
- Jeff Klayman's Density 1.33 (1976)
- Holt's O My Rosey Dreams (1983)

Additionally, she appeared in Stoop; Bambi Levine, Please Shut Up!; and as Judy Garland dying in her bathroom in London Loo. She appeared as herself in two documentary features: Beautiful Darling, about Candy Darling; and I Am Divine, about Divine.

In the mid-1970s, Hanft began appearing in movies, sometimes in cameo roles. Her film credits include the Woody Allen films Manhattan, Stardust Memories, The Purple Rose of Cairo, and Allen's segment in New York Stories. She was also a favorite of Paul Mazursky, who cast her in Next Stop, Greenwich Village and Willie & Phil. Other film appearances include Arthur, Honky Tonk Freeway, Moonstruck, License to Drive, Coming to America (where she uttered the now famous line “Go on Honey, take a chance”), and Used People. In the late 1990s, she began appearing on episodes of Law & Order, and continued to make occasional stage appearances in New York City.

== Personal life ==
Her husband, William Landers, predeceased her, as did her younger sister, Alice. She is survived by her other sister, Sarah Comma.

She died in Manhattan on May 30, 2013, of a post-surgical intestinal blockage.

== Filmography ==
=== Film ===
Helen Hanft film credits
Year	Title	Role	Notes
1976	Next Stop, Greenwich Village	Herb's Wife	
1979	Manhattan	Party Guest #3	
1980	Willie & Phil	Used Cars Salesperson	
1980	Stardust Memories	Vivian Orkin	
1981	Arthur	Perry's Wife	
1981	Honky Tonk Freeway	Bag Lady	
1985	The Purple Rose of Cairo	Movie Audience	
1986	9½ Weeks	Flea Market Shawl Seller	
1986	Off Beat	Waitress	
1987	Moonstruck	Lotte	
1988	Coming to America	Subway Lady	
1988	License to Drive	Miss Hellberg	
1989	New York Stories	Citizen	(segment "Oedipus Wrecks")
1989	Identity Crisis	Hag	
1989	Fear, Anxiety & Depression	Roz	
1990	Betsy's Wedding	Fitter	
1991	The Butcher's Wife	Molly	
1992	Used People	Aunt Ruthie	
1994	North	Operator	
1994	I.Q.	Rose	
1996	The Associate	Mrs. Cupchick	
1997	Mr. Jealousy	Millie	
1999	Trick	Greasy Spoon Waitress	
1999	Fever	Louisa	
2002	Dummy	Mrs. Gurkel	
2006	Puccini for Beginners	Old Lady At Cinema	
2007	Noise	Forceful Juror	
2009	When the Evening Comes	Rose Bushman	(final film role)

=== Television ===
Helen Hanft television credits
Year	Title	Role	Notes
1985	The Equalizer	Mrs. Washburn	Episode: "Back Home"
1989	Kojack: Ariana	Woman	TV movie
1997	Law & Order	Martha	Episode: "Denial"
2000	Law & Order: Special Victims Unit	Mrs. Billins	Episode: "Noncompliance"
2001	Law & Order	Vera	Episode: "Who Let the Dogs Out?"
2002	Law & Order: Criminal Intent	Ruth Cohen	Episode: "Yesterday"
