= Calling All Boys =

Single by the Flirts

from the album 10¢ a Dance
- Released: 1982 or 1983
- Genre: Hi-NRG
- Length: 4:34
- Label: Unidisc Music; BMC; Rams Horn
- Songwriter: Bobby Orlando
- Producer: Bobby Orlando

The Flirts singles chronology
"Passion" (1982)	"Calling All Boys" (1982)	"Danger" (1983)

Audio
- "Calling All Boys" on YouTube

"Calling All Boys" is a 1982 or 1983 single by the Flirts, a New York-based female vocal trio created by record producer and songwriter Bobby Orlando.

== Composition ==
The song was written and produced by Bobby Orlando.

== Charts ==
Chart (1983)	Peak position
Germany (GfK)	57

"Passion" / "Calling All Boys"

Chart (1982)	Peak position
US Dance Club Songs (Billboard)	21
