= Danger (The Flirts song) =

Single by The Flirts

from the album Born to Flirt
- Released: 1983
- Genre: Hi-NRG
- Songwriter: Bobby Orlando
- Producer: Bobby Orlando

The Flirts singles chronology
"Calling All Boys" (1983)	"Danger" (1983)	"On the Beach" (1983)

Audio
- "Danger" on YouTube

"Danger" is a 1983 single by The Flirts, a New York-based female vocal trio created by the producer/songwriter Bobby Orlando. It was written and produced by Orlando.

== Charts ==
Chart (1984)	Peak position
Switzerland (Schweizer Hitparade)	30
