= Women Behind Bars =

Play written by Tom Eyen

- Original language: English
- Written by: Tom Eyen
- Genre: Camp

Premiere
- Date: May 1, 1975
- Place: Astor Place Theatre; New York City

Women Behind Bars is a camp black comedy play by Tom Eyen, parodying the prison exploitation films produced by Universal, Warner Bros. and Republic Pictures during the 1950s.

== Plot ==
Set in the Women's House of Detention in Greenwich Village, there is, among the range of women, an innocent young woman, a chain-smoking street-wise tough girl, and a delicate Southern belle reminiscent of Blanche DuBois. The innocent was framed by her husband on a charge of armed robbery, and is brutalized, betrayed and sexually assaulted throughout her eight-year sentence. She is ultimately broken by the system and leaves jail as a hard-edged, gum-chomping drug dealer. These women are overseen by the prison's sadistic matron and her henchman.

== Productions ==
=== Original 1975 production ===
The original production at the off-Broadway Astor Place Theatre opened on May 1, 1975, featuring Pat Ast, Helen Hanft, Mary-Jennifer Mitchell and Sharon Barr. Alan Eichler was co-producer and press representative.

=== 1976 revival ===
The play was revived in 1976 at the Truck and Warehouse Theatre in New York with Pink Flamingos star Divine as the matron. It quickly developed a cult following and became a success.

=== 1977 London production ===
In 1977 the play, again starring Divine as the matron, had a successful run at the Whitehall Theatre in the West End of London. Fiona Richmond co-starred.

=== 1983 revival ===
The play was revived once again in Los Angeles in 1983, directed by Ron Link and featuring Lu Leonard, Adrienne Barbeau and Sharon Barr. The LA production ran for almost a year, first at the Cast Theater and then moving to the Roxy Theatre. Sally Kellerman and Linda Blair later joined the cast.

=== 2012 live reading ===
On May 7, 2012, The New Group presented a reading of the play, directed by Scott Elliott.

Cast

- Charles Busch as the matron
- Halley Feiffer as Mary-Eleanor
- Janeane Garofalo as Louise
- Nancy Giles as Jo-Jo
- Josh Hamilton as the men
- Natasha Lyonne as Cheri
- Cynthia Nixon as Blanche
- Rosie O'Donnell as Gloria
- Daphne Rubin-Vega as Guadalupe
- Rhea Perlman as Granny and The Warden
- Jennifer Tilly as Ada

=== 2020 Revival ===
A large-scale revival played the Montalbán Theatre in Los Angeles in January, 2020, presented by Winbrook Productions and "Just Pow" Productions. The production was conceived and directed by Scott Thompson. A new title song and background score was composed by Fred Barton.

Cast

- Kathy Griffin, Host
- Traci Lords as Gloria
- Eureka O'Hara as the Matron
- Mink Stole as Granny and The Warden
- Miss Coco Peru as Louise
- Ginger Minj as Ada
- Chi Chi DeVayne as Jo-Jo
- Suzie Kennedy as Cheri
- Poppy Fields as Blanche
- Wesley Woods as The Men
- Adrienne Couper Smith as Mary-Eleanor
- Tatiana Monteiro as Guadalupe

=== Contemporary ===
Women Behind Bars continues to be produced by gay repertory companies, such as San Francisco's Theatre Rhinoceros.

== Reception ==
The subtle lesbianism apparent in the original B movies is emphasized comedically throughout. The New York Times described the play as "an extraordinarily interesting work from one of America's most innovative and versatile playwrights."

== Sequel ==
Eyen and Divine wrote a 1978 follow-up play called The Neon Woman, which was produced in New York and San Francisco.
