= You & Me (The Flirts song) =

Single by The Flirts

from the album Blondes, Brunettes & Redheads
- Released: 1985
- Recorded: 1985
- Genre: Dance, freestyle
- Length: 6:15
- Label: CBS Associated Records
- Songwriters: Bobby Orlando; Clifton "Jiggs" Chase
- Producer: Bobby Orlando

The Flirts singles chronology
"Dancin' Madly Backwards" (1985)	"You & Me" (1985)	"Miss You" (1985)

Audio
- "You & Me" on YouTube

"You & Me" is a 1985 single by the Flirts, a vocal trio based in New York City. The single, taken from their album "Blondes, Brunettes, and Redheads," was produced by Bobby Orlando, the creator/founder of the group, and shared co-writing credits with Clifton "Jiggs" Chase. The featured vocalists on this single were Tricia Wygal, Debra "Debbie" Gaynor, and Christina Criscione.

== Background ==
In the United States, the single was a number-one hit on the dance chart for one week, thanks in part to a remix by Shep Pettibone and fueled by a music video that featured the trio in a "Rags to Riches" themed setting. The video featured a Billboard headline proclaiming "The Flirts Are Hits", but "You & Me", along the rest of the Flirts' releases, failed to cross over to the other charts.

== Track listings ==
12-inch (US)

- A. "You & Me" 6:15
- B1. "You & Me" (Instrumental) 6:40
- B2. "You & Me" (Dub) 6:00
