= The Flirts =

Group music band

- Also known as: The Musical in the World
- Origin: United States
- Genres: Hi-NRG; synth-pop
- Years active: 1982–2014
- Labels: "O" Records; Rams Horn; Sony Music

The Flirts are a project concept group formed by Bobby "O" Orlando, to front his performances as an artist, musician and songwriter. The group consisted of Orlando and featured a revolving roster of female session singers and models. Under The Flirts name, Orlando churned out hits "Passion", "Danger", "Helpless" and "Jukebox (Don't Put Another Dime)". While many of the girls were just models for the group, Andrea Del Conte, Rebecca Sullivan, Debra Gaynor, Tricia Wygal, and Christina Criscione used their real vocals. Today, the group features a relatively stable trio that performs at 80s music festivals and other venues mainly in the U.S. with some international appearances.

== Concept and first chart success ==
Orlando conceived the idea for the Flirts, wrote the songs, played the instruments, and produced the tracks. He then auditioned women to be the faces of the group. Orlando often called in the services of professional session singers to sing the female vocals for the tracks because most of the performers were trained as dancers, models or actresses. The Flirts went through numerous lineup changes, and with every album release and tour, some women left while others stayed. Orlando released six studio albums under The Flirts name from 1982 to 1992 and numerous singles.

"Jukebox" received significant airplay on MTV in 1982. The song rose to number 28 on the Billboard US Dance Chart. The follow-up single "Passion" peaked the same year at number 21 and was a success in Europe, reaching number 22 in the Netherlands and number 4 in Germany.

"Helpless (You Took My Love)" peaked at number 12 on the Billboard US Dance Chart, and reached number 13 on the German Top 75. Members of The Flirts performed in the German feature film Feel the Motion.

In 1985, "You and Me", which Orlando co-wrote with influential hip hop producer Clifton "Jiggs" Chase, topped the US dance chart.

== Discography ==
=== Albums ===
==== Studio albums ====
Title	Album details	Peak chart positions
Title	Album details	SWE
10¢ a Dance	Released: September 1982; Label: "O"; Formats: LP, cassette tape	38
Born to Flirt	Released: 1983; Label: Ariola, Unidisc; Formats: LP, cassette tape	—
Made in America	Released: June 1984; Label: Telefon; Formats: LP, cassette tape	—
Blondes Brunettes & Redheads	Released: October 1985; Label: CBS; Formats: LP, cassette tape	—
Questions of the Heart	Released: October 1986; Label: CBS; Formats: LP, cassette tape	—
Take a Chance on Me	Released: 1992; Label: Vono Disc; Formats: CD; Switzerland-only release	—
"—" denotes releases that did not chart or were not released in that territory.

==== Live albums ====
Title	Album details
Flirt with the Flirts	Released: 1983; Label: Rams Horn; Formats: 2xLP; Netherlands-only release
Passion of Disco – The Remix Album	Released: 14 November 2014; Label: Hargent New Media; Formats: CD; Hungary-only release

==== Compilation albums ====
Title	Album details
The Best of the Flirts	Released: September 1991; Label: "O"; Formats: CD, 2xLP, cassette tape
Greatest Hits	Released: March 1994; Label: Unidisc; Formats: CD; Canada-only release
Physical Attraction	Released: 2001; Label: Trilogie; Formats: 3xCD

=== Singles ===
Title	Year	Peak chart positions					
Title	Year	US Dance	BEL (FL)	DEN	GER	NL	SWI
"Jukebox (Don't Put Another Dime)"	1982	28	—	1	—	—	—
"Passion"	1982	21	36	14	4	23	4
"On the Beach"	1983	—	—	—	—	—	—
"We Just Want to Dance"	1983	—	—	—	—	—	—
"Calling All Boys"	1983	21	—	—	57	—	—
"Danger"	1983	—	—	—	—	—	30
"Helpless (You Took My Love)"	1984	12	—	—	13	—	15
"Telephone"	1984	—	—	—	—	—	—
"Dancin' Madly Backwards"	1985	47	—	—	46	—	—
"Voulez Vous"	1985	—	—	—	—	—	—
"You & Me"	1985	1	—	—	—	—	—
"New Toy"	1986	5	—	—	—	—	—
"Miss You"	1986	15	—	—	—	—	—
"All You Ever Think About Is (Sex)"	1986	—	—	—	—	—	—
"A Thing Called Love"	1988	—	—	—	—	—	—
"After School" (featuring Full Force)	1989	—	—	—	—	—	—
"—" denotes releases that did not chart or were not released in that territory.

==== Featured tracks on compilations ====
- "Danger" - Disco Discharge: Pink Pounders (2010)
- "Passion" - Disco Discharge: Gay Disco & Hi-NRG (2009)
- "Passion" - Grand 12 Inches 4 (2007, Sony)
- "Helpless (You Took My Love)" - I Love Bobby O (2006)
- "Passion" - Back to Mine: Pet Shop Boys (2005)
- "Passion" - I Love Disco Energy (2003)

== See also ==
- List of number-one dance hits (United States)
- List of artists who reached number one on the US Dance chart
