= Hard Magic =

Single by Divine

from the album Maid in England
- Released: 1985
- Genre: Hi-NRG, house
- Length: 7:10
- Label: Bellaphon, Proto Records
- Songwriter(s): M. Flinn, P. Morris
- Producer(s): Nick Titchener, Pete Ware

Divine singles chronology
"Twistin' the Night Away" (1985)	"Hard Magic" (1985)	"Little Baby" (1987)

"Hard Magic" is a song by Divine, released in 1985 as the third single from the album Maid in England.

== Chart performance ==
"Hard Magic" was Divine's last single to chart on the UK Singles Chart. It debuted and peaked at #87 before falling to #90 in its second week.

== Music video ==
The music video for the single features Divine in two roles. One as a female and one as a male. The video takes place in an African jungle village where a female captive (Divine) is at the mercy the village's chief (who's also a witch doctor who is also played by Divine) as he controls his captive with his hard voodoo magic.

== Track listings ==
- UK 7-inch single
1. "Hard Magic" - 7:10
2. "Hard Magic (Instrumental Mix)" - 2:54
- German vinyl, 12-inch single
1. "Hard Magic" - 7:10
2. "Hard Magic (Magic Mix)" - 6:48
3. "Hard Magic (Instrumental Mix)" - 2:54

== Charts ==
Chart (1985)	Peak Position
UK Singles Chart	87
