= Passion (The Flirts song) =

Single by the Flirts

from the album 10¢ a Dance
- Released: 1982
- Genre: Hi-NRG
- Length: 3:37
- Label: "O"
- Songwriter: Robert Phillip Orlando

The Flirts singles chronology
"Jukebox (Don't Put Another Dime)" / "Boy Crazy" (1982)	"Passion" (1982)	"Calling All Boys" (1983)

Audio
- "Passion" "Passion" (12" mix) on YouTube

"Passion" is a 1982 single by the Flirts, a New York-based vocal trio. Bobby Orlando wrote and produced the song.

== Charts ==
"Passion" was the trio's only hit in the Netherlands.

Chart (1982)	Peak position
Belgium (Ultratop 50 Flanders)	36
Germany (GfK)	4
Netherlands (Dutch Top 40)	22
Netherlands (Single Top 100)	23
Switzerland (Schweizer Hitparade)	4

=== "Passion" / "Calling All Boys" ===
Chart (1982)	Peak position
US Dance Club Songs (Billboard)	21
