= Helpless (You Took My Love) =

Single by The Flirts

from the album Made in America
- Released: 1984
- Recorded: 1983
- Genre: Hi-NRG
- Length: 7:44
- Label: "O" Records
- Songwriter: Bobby Orlando
- Producer: Bobby Orlando

The Flirts singles chronology
"On the Beach" (1983)	"Helpless (You Took My Love)" (1984)	"Dancin' Madly Backwards" (1985)

Audio
- "Helpless (You Took My Love)" "Helpless (You Took My Love)" (12" mix) on YouTube

"Helpless (You Took My Love)" is a song recorded by The Flirts, a New York-based female vocal trio created by Bobby Orlando, an American musician, songwriter and producer.

== Background ==
The song was written and produced by Bobby Orlando.

== Charts ==
=== Weekly charts ===
Chart (1984)	Peak position
Germany (GfK)	13
Switzerland (Schweizer Hitparade)	15
US Dance Club Songs (Billboard)	12
