= Tucson Pride =

Former LGBT pride organization in Arizona

- Founded: May, 1976
- Type: Non-Profit 501(c)(3)
- Location: Tucson, Arizona
- Region served: Tucson, Pima County, Arizona
- Website: tucsonpride.org
- Formerly called: Tucson Gay Coalition

Tucson Lesbian and Gay Alliance, commonly known as Tucson Pride, was an American LGBT pride organization based in Tucson, Arizona.

== History ==
Founded in 1977, Tucson Pride claims to be Arizona's first and oldest LGBTQ organization. It was founded in the aftermath of the 1976 murder of Richard Heakin. Heakin, who lived in Nebraska, visited a friend in Tucson and was beaten to death by four teenagers while exiting the Stonewall Tavern bar. The attackers were subsequently tried as juveniles, and sentenced to probation. Heakin’s murder became a motivation behind the foundation of Tucson Pride.

Tucson Pride first hosted an LGBTQ community event, the Gay Pride Festival & Memorial Picnic, at Himmel Park on June 26, 1977, also the National Gay Pride Day that year.

On January 21, 2026 Tucson Pride association, the third oldest Pride Association in the United States announced the cancellation of Tucson Pride and dissolution of the organization on February 21, 2026.

Jack Grace, known as Big Papa Hundo, organized a free pop-up Pride event on February 21, 2026 at the University of Arizona campus mall to keep the 50-year tradition of pride alive. The Tucson Pop Up Pride site, through Big Papa Hundo's dedicated platform, was used as the primary means to distribute information to the public leading up to the event.

== Administration ==
Tucson Pride was a non-profit organization. All members of the Board of Directors for Tucson Pride, as well as its committees, served on a strictly volunteer basis. No member receives any payment, financial or otherwise, for serving. There were 10 members serving on the Board of Directors at the time of its closure.

The Tucson Pride events "Pride on Parade" and "Pride in the Desert" were funded by a combination of community fundraising by the pride committee, corporate sponsorship's, vendor fees and donations collected from the participants at the festival.

Tucson Pride was a member of CAPI (Consolidated Association of Prides, Inc.) and Interpride.

== See also ==
- LGBT community
- LGBT rights in Arizona
- Same-sex marriage in Arizona
