= Astor Place Theatre =

Off-Broadway theatre in New York City

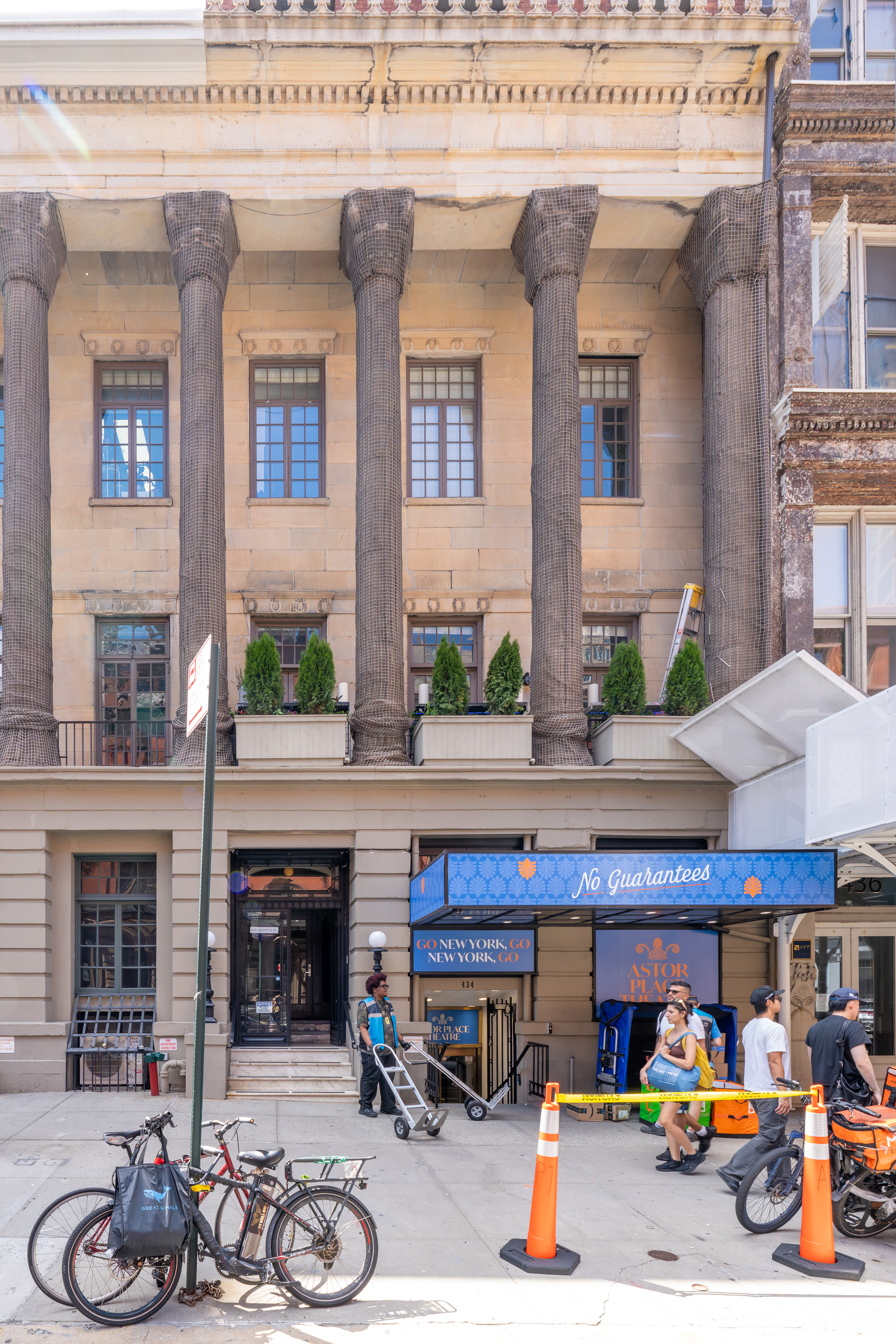
- Astor Place Theatre in 2026
- Interactive map of Astor Place Theatre
- Address: 434 Lafayette Street; New York City; United States
- Coordinates: 40.7293°N 73.9922°W
- Owner: Blue Man Productions
- Operator: No Guarantees Productions
- Type: Off-Broadway
- Production: Burnout Paradise

Construction
- Opened: January 17, 1968

Tenant
- No Guarantees Productions

Website
- Official website

The Astor Place Theatre is an off-Broadway house at 434 Lafayette Street in the NoHo section of Manhattan, New York City. The theater is located in the historic Colonnade Row, originally constructed in 1831 as a series of nine connected buildings, of which only four remain.

Bruce Mailman bought the building in 1965. On January 17, 1968, the theater opened with Israel Horovitz's The Indian Wants the Bronx starring newcomer Al Pacino. Since then, it has gained a reputation for introducing works by aspiring and often experimental playwrights, including Tom Eyen (Women Behind Bars, The Dirtiest Show in Town) and John Ford Noonan (A Couple White Chicks Sitting Around Talking). Established writers like Terrence McNally (Bad Habits), A.R. Gurney (The Dining Room, The Perfect Party) and Larry Shue (The Foreigner) also have premiered plays here. The musical revue, Jacques Brel is Alive and Well and Living in Paris enjoyed a successful run in 1974.

Starting in 1991, the theater served as home to the Blue Man Group, which purchased the theatre in 2001 and performed there until February 2, 2025. No Guarantees Productions, a company led by Christine Schwarzman, who is married to the businessman Stephen A. Schwarzman, leased the theater in May 2025 with plans to host dramas there.
