= Walk Like a Man (The Four Seasons song) =

1963 single by The Four Seasons

- A-side label of US single

Single by the Four Seasons

from the album Big Girls Don't Cry and Twelve Others
- B-side: "Lucky Ladybug"
- Released: January 1963
- Recorded: January 1963
- Genre: Rock and roll; pop; doo-wop
- Length: 2:17
- Label: Vee-Jay
- Songwriter(s): Bob Crewe, Bob Gaudio
- Producer(s): Bob Crewe

The Four Seasons singles chronology
"Santa Claus Is Coming to Town" (1962)	"Walk Like a Man" (1963)	"Ain't That a Shame!" (1963)

"Walk Like a Man" is a 1963 song written by Bob Crewe and Bob Gaudio and originally recorded by the Four Seasons. The song is sung from the perspective of a man whose girlfriend has been belittling him, and who takes his father's advice to "walk like a man" and leave the relationship in order to preserve his dignity. The song was a #1 hit in the United States for the Four Seasons. A 1985 cover version by Divine was a top 40 hit in several European countries.

== Production ==
The song features the counterpoint of Nick Massi's bass voice and the falsetto of lead singer Frankie Valli.

During the sessions that produced the recording, the fire department received an emergency call from the Abbey Victoria Hotel (the building that housed the Stea-Phillips Recording Studios). As producer Bob Crewe was insisting upon recording the perfect take, smoke and water started to seep into the studio; the room directly above the studio was on fire, but Crewe had blocked the studio door. He continued recording until firemen used their axes on the door and pulled Crewe out.

== Reception ==
"Walk Like a Man" was the Four Seasons' third number one hit. It reached the top of the Billboard Hot 100 on March 2, 1963, remaining there for three weeks. The song also went to number three on the R&B singles chart.

Cash Box described it as "a feelingful, cha cha beat stomper ... that again sports the falsetto gimmick" and has an "ultra-commercial arrangement by Charles Calello".

The song "Walk Like a Man" is part of The Rock and Roll Hall of Fame's 500 Songs that Shaped Rock and Roll list.

== Personnel ==
Partial credits.

The Four Seasons

- Frankie Valli – lead vocals, handclaps
- Tommy DeVito – harmony and backing vocals, guitar, handclaps
- Nick Massi – harmony and backing vocals, bass, handclaps
- Bob Gaudio – harmony and backing vocals, piano, handclaps

Additional musician and production staff

- Panama Francis – drums
- Bob Crewe – producer
- unknown – engineer

== Charts ==
Chart (1963)	Peak position
New Zealand (Lever Hit Parade)	1
UK	12
US Billboard Hot 100	1
US Billboard R&B	3

== Divine version ==
"Walk Like a Man"

Single by Divine

from the album Maid in England
- Released: 1985
- Genre: Hi-NRG; synth-pop; eurodisco
- Label: Proto Records, Liberation Records
- Songwriter(s): Bob Crewe, Bob Gaudio

Divine singles chronology
"T Shirts and Tight Blue Jeans" (1984)	"Walk Like a Man" (1985)	"Twistin' The Night Away" (1985)

Divine recorded his version of "Walk Like a Man" which was released in 1985 as the lead single from the album Maid in England.

=== Track listing ===
1. "Walk Like a Man" – 3:50
2. "Man Talk" – 3:23

=== Charts ===
Chart (1985)	Peak position
Australian Singles Chart	75
German Singles Chart	52
Irish Singles Chart	23
Swiss Singles Chart	28
UK Singles Chart	23

== Other versions ==
Other versions have been recorded by artists such as Jan & Dean (1963) off the album Jan & Dean Take Linda Surfin, the Mary Jane Girls (1986), Dreamhouse (2008) and Chance & The Phantasmics (2012). Plastic Bertrand did a version in French, entitled C'est Le Rock 'n' Roll (1978), and Hungarian band Bon Bon recorded the song with the title Sexepilem (1999).

== In popular culture ==
The song is featured in the opening credits of the 1979 film The Wanderers, as well as the films Heart and Souls (1993), Mrs. Doubtfire (1993) and Sleepers (1996). It is included in the 2004 biographical jukebox musical Jersey Boys, as well as the 2014 film adaptation.
