= You Think You're a Man =

1984 single by Divine

Single by Divine

from the album The Story So Far
- Released: July 1984
- Genre: Hi-NRG; disco
- Length: 3:35 (radio mix)
- Label: Bellaphon; Proto
- Songwriter: Geoff Deane
- Producers: Barry Evangeli; Stock Aitken Waterman

Divine singles chronology
"Shake It Up" (1983)	"You Think You're a Man" (1984)	"I'm So Beautiful" (1984)

Music video
- "You Think You're a Man" on YouTube

"You Think You're a Man" is a song by American performance artist Divine, released as a single in 1984. The song appeared on the compilation album The Story So Far, released the same year. It was written by Geoff Deane, formerly the lead singer and main songwriter with both the Leyton Buzzards and Modern Romance, and his occasional songwriting partner Keith Miller. Deane later went on to write the cross dressing-themed film Kinky Boots.

== Chart performance ==
"You Think You're a Man" was the first single produced by Stock Aitken Waterman to reach the UK top 40 chart, peaking at number 16 in August 1984 and number 14 on the Irish Singles Chart. It spent nine weeks on the German singles chart, peaking at number 32 in September 1984. It was Divine's third top 40 single on the chart.

The single was also successful in Australia, where it reached number 8 in October 1984 (for two weeks) and remained on the Kent Music Report top 100 chart for 18 weeks. It also became Divine's first single to chart on the New Zealand singles chart. It debuted and peaked at number 27 in March 1985, and spent four weeks on the chart.

== Charts ==
=== Weekly charts ===
Chart (1984)	Peak Position
Australia (Kent Music Report)	8
Finland (IFPI)	24
Germany (Media Control)	32
Ireland (IRMA)	14
New Zealand (RIANZ)	27
Switzerland (Hitparade)	9
UK Singles (Official Charts)	16

=== Year-end charts ===
Chart (1984)	Position
Australia (Kent Music Report)	78

== Live performances ==
Divine performed the song as the featured musical guest on the Australian TV program Countdown on October 7, 1984. He also performed on the British music chart TV show Top of the Pops on July 19, 1984, which resulted in a barrage of complaints.

== Media appearances ==
The song can be heard in a club scene in the third episode of the Channel 4 series It's a Sin. A cover of the song, by dance group Full Frontal, was featured in the British television series Queer as Folk, in the second episode. It was also featured in the series premiere of the North American version.

== Cover versions ==
The song was covered by the Vaselines in 1987 and appeared on the EP Son of a Gun. Australian actor Tim Campbell covered the song on his 2018 album Electrifying 80s.

== Track listings ==
- Dutch 12-inch vinyl single
1. "You Think You're a Man" (remix) – 6:26
2. "You Think You're a Man" (radio mix) – 3:35
3. "Give It Up" – 3:05
- German 12-inch vinyl single
1. "You Think You're a Man" (special remix) – 6:26
2. "You Think You're a Man" – 8:07
