= Shake It Up (Divine song) =

Single by Divine

from the album The Story So Far
- Released: 1983
- Genre: Hi-NRG, dance
- Length: 3:11
- Label: Break Records
- Songwriter(s): Bobby Orlando
- Producer(s): Bobby Orlando

Divine singles chronology
"Love Reaction" (1983)	"Shake It Up" (1983)	"You Think You're a Man" (1984)

"Shake It Up" is a song by American performance artist Divine, released as a single in 1983. The song was later included on the 1984 compilation album The Story So Far.

== Chart performance ==
"Shake It Up" became Divine's fourth and last single to chart on the Dutch singles chart. It debuted at No. 30 before climbing to and peaking at No. 13 in its third week. The song spent a total of 6 weeks on the chart.

On the German singles chart, "Shake It Up" peaked at No. 26 for one week, with a total of 11 weeks on the chart. The song became Divine's second top 40 single on the chart.

== Track listings ==
- Dutch vinyl, 7-inch single
1. "Shake It Up" - 3:11
2. "Shake It Up" (album version) - 5:50
3. "Jungle Jezebel" - 4:42
- German vinyl, 12-inch single
1. "Shake It Up" (special long version) - 6:41
2. "Shake It Up" (Ed Smit remix) - 9:28
3. "Shake It Up" (instrumental version) - 4:00

== Charts ==
Chart (1983)	Peak position
Belgium (Ultratop 50 Flanders)	14
Germany (Media Control)	26
Netherlands (Single Top 100)	13
UK Singles (OCC)	82
