= The Dirtiest Show in Town =

Off-Broadway hit play

- Original Off-Broadway program
- Music: Jeff Barry
- Lyrics: Tom Eyen
- Book: Tom Eyen
- Productions: 1970 Off-Broadway; 1971 West End; 1971 Los Angeles; 1980 film

The Dirtiest Show in Town is a musical revue with a book and lyrics by Tom Eyen and music by Jeff Barry.

== Overview ==
An attack on air pollution, the Vietnam War, urban blight and computerized conformity, the show is filled with sex, nudity, and strong lesbian and gay male characters. The show culminates in a massive orgy, with the entire naked cast writhing on the floor. The Dirtiest Show in Town is distinguished from a raunchy sex show by Eyen's clever dialogue and witty observations, which impressed even mainstream critics when the show was first staged near the end of the sexual revolution of the 1960s.

== Productions ==
Directed by Eyen, The Dirtiest Show in Town was initially produced Off-Off Broadway at La MaMa Experimental Theatre Club in spring, 1970. It then opened Off-Broadway on June 27, 1970, at the Astor Place Theatre, and closed on September 19, 1971 after 509 performances. The cast featured R. A. Dow, Paul Matthew Eckhart, and Ellen Gurin.

It subsequently toured and was then staged at the Duchess Theatre in London's West End in May 1971, where it ran to March 1973 for nearly 800 performances.

Another production opened at the Ivar Theater in Los Angeles in 1971, starring Michael Kearns and Eyen's muse Sharon Barr. In 1975, Eyen and Henry Krieger created a version of the show called The Dirtiest Musical in Town, starring Nell Carter.

== Film ==
In 1980, Eyen directed a film version of the show for Showtime, making it the first made-for-TV movie ever produced for cable. The updated storyline for the film version begins with members of a New York City gym obsessing about their life situations, eventually leading up to the gay and straight characters writhing together in an orgy. It stars Sharon Barr and a young John Wesley Shipp.
