= Mimi Martel =

American singer

Mimi Martel was an American singer, active from 1949 to 1955. During this time, Martel produced more than 50 singles paired with several backing bands, including The Four Rhythmaires, The Toppers, Lew Raymond, Nat Charles and His Orchestra, and the Les Morgan Orchestra. Most of her recordings were cover version of hits by such singers as Kay Starr, Rosemary Clooney and Patti Page, released on the budget Tops Records label. She was able to emulate all of their various styles, including Page's popular multiple voice technique. By 1956, Martel had moved from singing into television, appearing with country singer Red Rowe in the daytime show Fare For Ladies.

In 2026 a CD of her recordings was released by Jasmine Records.
