= Shoot Your Shot =

- Dutch release picture sleeve

Single by Divine

from the album Jungle Jezebel
- Released: 1982
- Genre: Disco; hi-NRG
- Songwriter(s): Bobby Orlando
- Producer(s): Bobby Orlando

Divine singles chronology
"Native Love (Step by Step)" (1982)	"Shoot Your Shot" (1982)	"Love Reaction" (1983)

Music video
- "Shoot Your Shot" (TopPop, 1982) on YouTube

"Shoot Your Shot" is a song by American performance artist Divine, released as a single in 1982. The song appeared on Divine's first album, Jungle Jezebel (titled My First Album in some territories), in 1982 and was later included on the 1984 compilation album The Story So Far.

== Chart performance ==
"Shoot Your Shot" became Divine's second single to chart on the Dutch Top 40 after "Native Love (Step by Step)". It debuted at No. 26 and eventually peaked at No. 3. The song spent a total of 10 weeks on the chart. "Shoot Your Shot" was certified gold (100,000 copies) in the Netherlands.

== Cover versions ==
This song was covered by Dutch Electroformation Image Transmission in the '90s and by German artist Ringo in 1986.

== Track listings ==
- Dutch CD maxi single
1. "Shoot Your Shot" (radio version) - 4:08
2. "Shoot Your Shot" (special extended version) - 6:24
3. "Shoot Your Shot" (12-inch version) - 8:06
- U.S. 12-inch vinyl single
1. "Shoot Your Shot" (dance mix) - 6:31
2. "Jungle Jezebel" (dance mix) - 4:47

== Charts ==
Chart (1983)	Peak position
Austria (Ö3 Austria Top 40)	9
Belgium (Ultratop 50 Flanders)	4
Germany (Media Control)	15
Netherlands (Dutch Top 40)	3
Netherlands (Single Top 100)	7
Switzerland (Schweizer Hitparade)	8
US Hot Dance Club Songs (Billboard)	39
