= My First Album (Divine album) =

Studio album by Divine
- Released: March 12, 1982
- Genre: Hi-NRG
- Length: 34:06
- Label: Metronome (Germany); O (US)
- Producer: Bobby Orlando

Divine chronology
My First Album (1982)	T Shirts and Tight Blue Jeans (1984)

My First Album (also known as Jungle Jezebel and Divine) is the first album by American performance artist Divine. It was released in 1982.

== Track listing ==
Side one
No.	Title	Writer(s)	Length
1.	"Shoot Your Shot"	Bobby Orlando	6:24
2.	"Jungle Jezebel"	Orlando	4:42
3.	"Native Love (Step by Step)"	Orlando / Mark Bauman	3:56

Side two
No.	Title	Writer(s)	Length
1.	"Kick Your Butt"	Orlando	5:22
2.	"Alphabet Rap"	Orlando	6:32
3.	"Native Love" (instrumental)	Orlando / Bauman	8:10

== Charts ==
Chart performance for My First Album
Chart (1983)	Peak position
German Albums (Offizielle Top 100)	35
Swedish Albums (Sverigetopplistan)	48
