= The Neon Woman =

Comic play by Tom Eyen

The Neon Woman is a comic play written by Tom Eyen.

The play is an outrageous murder mystery set in a seedy Baltimore burlesque house run by a retired stripper. It was written as a vehicle for Pink Flamingos star Divine, who had previously starred in a revival of Eyen's Women Behind Bars. The cast also featured Holly Woodlawn, Helen Hanft, Brenda Bergman, William Duff-Griffin, Maria Duval, Sweet William Edgar, Lee Corbet, Debra Greenfield, Hope Stansbury, and George Patterson, and was directed by longtime Eyen collaborator Ron Link.

The play was produced at Hurrah, a dance club on Manhattan's Upper West Side. The Neon Woman opened on April 16, 1978, and had 84 performances, closing on July 15, 1978.

A live recording showed up on a 1990 videotape entitled A Divine Double Feature, paired with The Diane Linkletter Story, which also starred Divine.
