= I'm So Beautiful =

1984 single by Divine

Single by Divine

from the album The Story So Far
- Released: October 1984
- Genre: Disco; hi-NRG
- Length: 7:51 (album version); 4:40 (demo version); 3:40 (7" edit)
- Label: Proto Records
- Songwriters: Matt Aitken, Mike Stock
- Producers: Barry Evangeli, Pete Waterman

Divine singles chronology
"You Think You're a Man" (1984)	"I'm So Beautiful" (1984)	"T Shirts and Tight Blue Jeans" (1984)

Music video
- "I'm So Beautiful" on YouTube

"I'm So Beautiful" is a song by American performance artist Divine, released as a single in 1984. The song also appeared on the compilation album The Story So Far, released the same year.

== Chart performance ==
"I'm So Beautiful" debuted on the UK Singles Chart at number 58 before climbing to and peaking at number 52 in its second week. The song spent a total of two weeks on the chart.

"I'm So Beautiful" fared better in Germany where it peaked at number 38 and spent a total of 9 weeks on the German singles chart.

== Track listings ==
- German Vinyl, 7-inch single
1. "I'm So Beautiful" - 3:40
2. "Show Me Around" - 3:20
- UK Vinyl, 12-inch single
1. "I'm So Beautiful (mix)" - 7:40
2. "I'm So Beautiful (Divine mix)" - 6:21
3. "Show Me Around" - 3:13

== Music video ==
In the music video for "I'm So Beautiful", Divine is seen dancing and singing in a hall of mirrors. The video includes several black-and-white scenes of Snow White and the Seven Dwarfs as lawn ornaments.

== Charts ==
Chart (1984–85)	Peak Position
Finnish Single Chart	17
German Singles Chart	38
New Zealand Singles Chart	48
UK Singles (Official Charts)	52

In Australia, "I'm So Beautiful" missed the Kent Music Report top 100 singles chart, but was listed as one of the singles receiving significant sales reports beyond the top 100 for 4 weeks in January and February 1985; with its highest ranking being first on this list.
