= Native Love (Step by Step) =

- Dutch release picture sleeve

Single by Divine

from the album Jungle Jezebel
- Released: 1982
- Genre: Hi-NRG; disco
- Label: Break Records
- Songwriter: Bobby Orlando
- Producer: Bobby Orlando

Divine singles chronology
"Born to Be Cheap" (1981)	"Native Love (Step by Step)" (1982)	"Shoot Your Shot" (1982)

Audio
- "Native Love (Step by Step)" on YouTube

"Native Love (Step by Step)" is a song by American performance artist Divine, released as a single in 1982. The song also appeared on Divine's first album, Jungle Jezebel (titled My First Album in some territories), in 1982 and was later included on the 1984 compilation album The Story So Far. It was produced by Bobby Orlando.

== Chart performance ==
"Native Love (Step by Step)" became Divine's first single to chart on the Dutch singles chart. It debuted at No. 37 before climbing to and peaking at No. 28 in its second week. The song spent a total of 11 weeks on the chart.

"Native Love (Step by Step)" remains Divine's highest-charting song on the U.S. Hot Dance Club Songs chart, where it peaked at No. 21.

== Track listing ==
- Dutch vinyl, 12-inch single
1. "Native Love (Step by Step)" (dance mix) - 5:10
2. "Native Love (Step by Step)" (remixed version/USA remix) - 8:13

== Song usage ==
"Native Love (Step by Step)" was used in the film An Englishman in New York.

== Charts ==
Chart (1982)	Peak Position
Netherlands (Single Top 100)	28
U.S. Hot Dance Club Songs (Billboard)	21
