= Tom Eyen =

American writer (1940–1991)

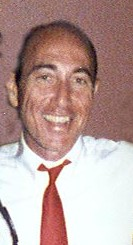
Tom Eyen, 1986

Tom Eyen (August 14, 1940 – May 26, 1991) was an American playwright, lyricist, television writer and director. He received a Tony Award for Best Book of a Musical for Dreamgirls in 1981.

Eyen is best known for works at opposite ends of the theatrical spectrum. Mainstream theatergoers became acquainted with him in 1981, when he partnered with composer Henry Krieger and director Michael Bennett to write the book and lyrics for the hit Broadway musical Dreamgirls, about an African-American female singing trio, which was made into a 2006 film. Eyen's career started, however, with experimental theatre that he wrote and directed off-off Broadway in the 1960s. This led to his off-Broadway success with The Dirtiest Show in Town (1970), a musical revue with nudity, and Women Behind Bars (1975), a camp parody of women's prison exploitation films. Eyen died of AIDS-related complications in Palm Beach, Florida at the age of 50.

== Early life and education ==
Eyen was born in Cambridge, Ohio, the youngest of six children. His father and mother, Julia Eyen, owned and ran a family restaurant. Eyen's interest in musical theatre began by the age of 11. He attended Ohio State University but left before graduating. Eyen moved to New York City in 1960 to study acting at the American Academy of Dramatic Arts from 1961 to 1962, again leaving before completing the program, but discovering his interest in writing plays. Later, Eyen would sometimes make outlandish or humorous claims about his background.

== Career ==
=== 1960 to 1970 ===
Eyen sought acting roles without success, and worked briefly as a press agent, before he began writing for the theatre. He found an artistic home in the 1960s off-off-Broadway Experimental theatre scene, based at Caffe Cino and La MaMa Experimental Theatre Company. He gave Bette Midler her first professional acting roles in Miss Nefertiti Regrets and Cinderella Revisited. Both were produced in 1965, a children's play during the daytime and an adult show by night. With a grant from the Rockefeller Foundation, Eyen formed his own theatrical company, the Theatre of the Eye Repertory, in 1964. The company performed for a decade, and took Eyen's play about Sarah Bernhardt, Sarah B. Divine!, to the Spoleto Festival in Italy in 1967. Eyen's work was central to the 1960s neo-expressionist off-off-Broadway movement. The New York Times wrote in 1984, "His plays are known for emotionally grotesque material combined with sharp satire."

Eyen was prolific, writing, and usually directing, 35 plays at La MaMa alone during the 1960s and 1970s. His early off-off-Broadway plays, other than those noted above, included:

- Happening at the Cafe (1964; La MaMa; written by Ruth Landshoff, directed by Eyen)
- My Next Husband Will Be A Beauty! (1964; La MaMa; written and directed by Eyen)
- Frustrata (1964; La MaMa; written and directed by Eyen)
- The White Whore and the Bit Player (1964; La MaMa; written and directed by Eyen)
- Why Hanna's Skirt Won't Stay Down (1964)
- Frustata, The Dirty Little Girl with the Paper Rose Stuck in Her Head, Is Demented! (1965)
- Can't You See a Prince? (1965)
- The Last Great Cocktail Party (1965)
- The Demented World Of Tom Eyen (1965)
- Why Hanna's Skirt Won't Stay Down; or, Admission 10c (1965; La MaMa; written and directed by Eyen)
- Miss Nefertiti Regrets (1965; La MaMa; written and directed by Eyen)
- Give My Regards to Off-Off Broadway (1966; La MaMa; written by Eyen, directed by Ron Link)
- Court (1967)
- Sarah B. Divine! (1967)
- Grand Tenement/November 22nd (1967)
- The (An Organic Happening) (1968)
- Who Killed My Bald Sister Sophie? Or, Thank God for Small Favours! (1968)
- When Johnny Comes Dancing Home Again (1968)
- Alice Through a Glass Lightly (1968)
- 4 Noh Plays by Tom Eyen (1969)
- Caution: A Love Story (1969)
- Kama Sutra (date unknown)

The title character in Why Hanna's Skirt Won't Stay Down has been described as representative of the crudeness, exuberance, decadence and profundity of the movement and the period.

=== 1970 to 1980 ===
In 1970, Eyen had his biggest commercial success to date with The Dirtiest Show in Town, a satirical response to, and example of, the period's plays depicting nudity and sexual situations. The Dirtiest Show in Town initially ran at the Astor Place Theatre for two seasons, with later runs both off-Broadway in New York and in London's West End. He also wrote the song "Ode to a Screw" with Peter Cornell for the 1971 Miloš Forman film Taking Off. Eyen's other shows in the early 1970s included:

- The Dirtiest Show in Town (1970; La MaMa, before transferring to Astor Place Theatre; written and directed by Eyen)
- Areatha in the Ice Palace; Or, The Fully Guaranteed Fuck-Me Doll (1970)
- Gertrude Stein and Other Great Men (1970)
- Lana Got Laid In Lebanon (1970)
- What Is Making Gilda so Gray?; Or, It Just Depends on Who You Get (1970; La MaMa; written by Eyen, directed by Neil Flanagan)
- The Death of Off-Broadway Or: Money (Sieg Heil!) (A Street Play) (1970; directed by Eyen and Gerald Miller, a play on the streets of New York beginning in front of the Astor Place Theatre, progressing to other off-Broadway theaters, and ending at the Theatre de Lys)
- The White Whore And The Bit Player (1971)
- Three Drag Queens from Daytona (1973; La MaMa; written by Eyen, directed by Neil Flanagan)
- The White Whore and the Bit Player / La Estrella y La Monja (1973; multilingual production)
- 2008: A Spaced Oddity (1974; La MaMa; written by Eyen, music by Gary William Friedman)

According to The New York Times, "Eyen was called the Neil Simon of off-off-Broadway at one point when he had four plays running simultaneously." In 1973, Eyen co-wrote the book for and directed one of Broadway's most notorious flops, the Paul Jabara disco musical Rachael Lily Rosenbloom (And Don't You Ever Forget It), which closed after seven previews. The lead character, a flamboyant entertainer, was inspired by Midler, who was apparently offered and refused the role. Following this setback, Eyen began commuting to Los Angeles to write for television and films. In 1974, he became one of the first well-known writers to write a hardcore pornographic film. He contributed writing to the 1976/1977 satirical soap opera Mary Hartman, Mary Hartman, produced by Norman Lear. In 1978, Eyen earned an Emmy Award nomination for writing Midler's first television special, Ol' Red Hair is Back.

Eyen's campy and disturbing parody of 1950s women's prison exploitation films, Women Behind Bars, became a major off-Broadway hit in 1975. Pat Ast first played the lead role of the sadistic matron in drag, followed by Divine. The New York Times called it "an extraordinarily interesting work from one of America's most innovative and versatile playwrights." Eyen followed this success with The Neon Woman, another off-Broadway play starring Divine, in 1978. The New York Times wrote, "His plays are known for emotionally grotesque material combined with sharp satire." In 1980, Eyen directed a film version of The Dirtiest Show In Town for Showtime, making it the first made-for-cable television movie. The film featured John Wesley Shipp.

In 1976, he appeared in Rosa von Praunheim's documentary film about New York's SoHo theatre and arts scene in the 1970s, Underground and Emigrants.

=== Dreamgirls and later work ===
Eyen and Henry Krieger first worked together on the 1975 musical version of The Dirtiest Show in Town, called The Dirtiest Musical in Town. Nell Carter's performance in that musical inspired Eyen and Krieger to craft a musical about a black singing trio, which they workshopped for Joe Papp with Carter, Sheryl Lee Ralph, and Loretta Devine. The project was shelved in 1978 when Carter took a role in a soap opera. A year later, the project caught the interest of Broadway director-producer Michael Bennett, who asked Eyen to direct a workshop production of Big Dreams, as the musical was then named, featuring Ralph, Loretta Devine, and gospel singer Jennifer Holliday as Carter's replacement. However, Holliday left the project, unhappy that her character died at the conclusion of the first act. After several workshops and numerous rewrites, Bennett decided that the production needed Holliday, and the team rewrote act two to build up Holliday's character.

Produced on Broadway in 1981, Dreamgirls was the biggest commercial success of Eyen's career. It was nominated for thirteen Tony Awards, including two for Eyen: Best Book and Best Original Score. The show won six Tonys, including Best Book. It also earned Eyen a Drama Desk Award nomination for Outstanding Lyrics. The original cast album won Eyen a Grammy Award as lyricist, and one of the show's songs, "And I Am Telling You I'm Not Going", as sung by Holliday, became a #1 hit on the Billboard R&B chart. In 1984, Eyen sought to duplicate his Dreamgirls success with Kicks: The Showgirl Musical, a collaboration with composer Alan Menken about the Rockettes during World War II. The show never made it past the workshop stage, though individual numbers from the show have been performed in concert.

A film adaptation of Dreamgirls, written and directed by Bill Condon, was released in 2006 by DreamWorks and Paramount Pictures. Two of Eyen's songs from the soundtrack, "And I Am Telling You I'm Not Going", as sung by Jennifer Hudson, and "One Night Only", as sung by Beyoncé Knowles, became hits. To promote the film's release, DreamWorks and the licensee of the musical, The Tams-Witmark Music Library, paid the licensing fees for all non-professional stage performances of Dreamgirls in 2006. As a result, more than fifty high schools, colleges, and community theaters staged productions of Dreamgirls that year.

== Death ==
Eyen died of complications from AIDS in 1991, at the age of fifty, in Palm Beach, Florida. A memorial service was held at the St. James Theatre in New York City on September 23, 1991. In 1993, Eyen posthumously received the Jerome Lawrence and Robert E. Lee Theatre Research Institute Award from Ohio State University, where his papers are archived.

== Sources ==
- Stone, Wendell (2005). Caffe Cino: the birthplace of off-off-Broadway.
