= Love Reaction =

Single by Divine

from the album The Story So Far
- Released: 1983
- Genre: Disco
- Length: 5:31
- Label: Break
- Songwriter(s): Bobby Orlando
- Producer(s): Bobby Orlando

Divine singles chronology
"Shoot Your Shot" (1982)	"Love Reaction" (1983)	"Shake It Up" (1983)

"Love Reaction" is a song by American performance artist Divine, released as a single in 1983. The song was later included on the 1984 compilation album The Story So Far. It has been noted for its similarity to New Order's song "Blue Monday", released earlier in 1983, with Alexis Petridis of The Guardian calling it "basically... 'Blue Monday' with a new vocal" and producer Bobby Orlando "Blue Monday"'s "most vociferous disciple".

== Chart performance ==
"Love Reaction" became Divine's third single to chart on the Dutch singles chart. It debuted at No. 35 before climbing to and peaking at No. 25 in its second week. The song spent a total of 4 weeks on the chart.

"Love Reaction" spent a total of 7 weeks on the German singles chart and peaked at No. 55. It spent one week at its peak.

== Track listings ==
- Dutch vinyl, 12-inch single
1. "Love Reaction" – 5:31
2. "Love Reaction" (radio version) – 3:20
3. "Love Reaction" (instrumental) – 5:00
- German vinyl, 12-inch single
1. "Love Reaction" (album version) – 5:34
2. "Love Reaction" (special maxi version) – 6:58
3. "Love Reaction" (instrumental version) – 4:04

== Charts ==
Chart (1983–1984)	Peak position
Belgium (Ultratop 50 Flanders)	24
Dutch Singles Chart	25
Finnish Singles Chart	27
German Singles Chart	55
UK Singles Chart	65
