= Barry Evangeli =

British-Greek Cypriot record producer

Barry Evangeli is a British-Greek Cypriot record producer, who has produced records for such artists as Gloria Gaynor (I Wish You Love CD) and the Divine Record Album Collection. He was the Executive Officer for Proto Records, an independent British record label with guaranteed distribution deals. At the time a young Pete Waterman was based out of the business. Proto at one time had considerable success with its sole exclusive artist, Hazell Dean.

In 1984 Proto Records called upon Mike Stock, Matt Aitken and Pete Ware, a keyboard player, to write and produce the song "Anna Maria Lena" which would be the entry for Cyprus during the Eurovision Song Contest 1984 in Luxembourg. It was performed by Andy Paul and came in 15th at the event.

In 1986 Proto Records closed its operation.
