= Bobby Orlando =

American record producer, songwriter, and musician

- Also known as: Bobby O
- Born: January 10, 1958 (age 68)
- Origin: New York City, U.S.
- Genres: Hi-NRG; disco
- Occupations: Record producer; songwriter; multi-instrumentalist
- Labels: "O"; Bobcat; Memo; MenoVision; Bobco Music Inc.

Robert Philip Orlando also known as Bobby Orlando or just Bobby O (January 10, 1958), is an American record producer, indie record label owner, songwriter, and musician. He is regarded as an innovator in the hi-NRG genre for developing his signature sound, using a "powerful beat" and "new wave-style" vocals with the help of synthesizers, piano, guitars, cowbells and a "heavy [synthesizer] bass".

== Early life ==
The son of a suburban New York schoolteacher, Orlando declined a classical music scholarship to pursue his musical interest, glam rock. In the late 1970s, his professional interests turned to disco and shortly thereafter, he established his own record label, "O" Records.

== Music career ==
Bobby Orlando has been a music producer, songwriter, musician, and record label impresario.

Orlando is credited as one of the founding fathers of Hi-NRG dance music. His productions are easily identifiable by their dense synthesizers, rolling bass lines, and resounding percussion. He has played multiple instruments on his tracks including electronic keyboards, guitars, bass, synthesizers, drums, piano, assorted percussion, trumpet and saxophone. The ringing cowbell percussion lines and robotic sequencers heard in "She Has a Way", "The Best Part of Breakin' Up" and "Native Love (Step by Step)" have been described as defining his trademark sound.

As a solo artist, Bobby O had hits with tracks "She Has a Way", "How to Pick Up Girls", "Suspicious Minds", and "I'm So Hot for You". He created his project concept The Flirts, to further front his performances as an artist, musician and songwriter. With an ever revolving roster of female session singers and models, Orlando churned out the hits "Passion", "Danger", and "Helpless". His association with underground film star Divine resulted in classic club anthems "Native Love (Step by Step)" (featuring Orlando's voice in the chorus), "Love Reaction", and "Shoot Your Shot". Orlando also produced The Fast, later to be known as Man 2 Man.

When Neil Tennant, then an assistant editor at Smash Hits, and later a member of Pet Shop Boys, was sent to interview the Police in 1983 in New York, he sought out Orlando. Both Tennant and fellow Pet Shop Boy Chris Lowe admired Orlando's sound and productions, with "Passion" by the Flirts being a particular favorite, later describing it as "the most important song of our lives." Orlando decided to produce a Pet Shop Boys album and released their first two earliest 12-inch singles including the original 1984 version of "West End Girls" and "One More Chance". Orlando and the Pet Shop Boys recorded twelve tracks together, including the original versions of "It's a Sin", "Opportunities (Let's Make Lots of Money)", and "I Get Excited".

Orlando's songs frequently deal with philosophical themes such as "Try It (I'm in Love with a Married Man)", which was given a contemporary twist when it was re-recorded by Pet Shop Boys in 2003 (see Disco 3). Many of Orlando's lyrics describe unrequited love, private despair, personal angst and a truth-seeking perspective. Orlando frequently etched philosophical maxims into vinyl records featuring his songs; these adages being literally cut into the grooves near the "lead out" and "lock grooves" of the vinyl. His music has appeared in numerous motion pictures and tv productions, including A Nightmare on Elm Street 2: Freddy's Revenge, Wigstock: The Movie, Kiss Kiss Bang Bang, Valley Girl, Dark Mirror, Flying, High Risk, Rappin, Underground, This Is The Night, Eric and Gossip Girl.

French electroclash duo Miss Kittin & the Hacker mention Orlando in their song "Walking in the Sunshine" from their 2001 release, First Album ("I love men like Bobby Orlando / The Flirts composer a long time ago / It makes me laugh a lot, you know / But I don't want to show").

Orlando has influenced various Eurodisco, tropical house, techno, Italo disco, electronic dance music ("EDM") and hi-NRG releases. He has been cited by music historians for his contribution to dance music.

In 2025, Bobby O returned to recording with the album Energizer of Purpose, featuring 11 new tracks.

== Production discography ==
Bobby Orlando productions:

Year	Title	Artist(s)
1981	"Desire"	Roni Griffith
1981	"Street Music"	The Bang Gang
1982	"Passion"	The Flirts
1982	"(Don't Put Another Dime In) The Jukebox"	The Flirts
1982	"Bring on the Men"	Wow
1982	"Native Love (Step by Step)"	Divine
1982	"Who's Your Boyfriend?"	Eric
1982	"Calling All Boys"	The Flirts
1982	"(The Best Part of) Breakin' Up"	Roni Griffith
1982	"Beat by Beat (Listen to My Heartbeat)"	Bobby 'O'
1982	"Shoot Your Shot"	Divine
1982	"I'm So Hot for You"	Bobby 'O'
1982	"She Has a Way"	Bobby 'O'
1983	"Danger"	The Flirts
1983	"Shake It Up"	Divine
1983	"Take a Chance on Me"	Waterfront Home
1983	"Givin' Up"	Bobby 'O'
1983	"Love Reaction"	Divine
1984	"Einstein"	The Beat Box Boys
1984	"Helpless (You Took My Love)"	The Flirts
1984	"West End Girls"	Pet Shop Boys
1984	"One More Chance"	Pet Shop Boys
1985	"From a Whisper to a Scream"	Bobby 'O' with Claudja Barry
1985	"You & Me"	The Flirts

=== Oh Romeo discography ===
Oh Romeo, was a concept group created by Bobby Orlando. Each release featured different session singers.

Year	Song title	Label
1983	"Try It (I'm in Love with a Married Man)" / "Lookin' Out"	Bobcat Records
1983	"These Memories"	Bobcat Records
1984	"Once Is Not Enough" / "Light of Love"	Oh My! Records
1985	"One More Shot"	Memo Records
1987	"Living Out a Fantasy"	

- The song "One More Shot" was also featured on the 1994 Avex Trax album Super Eurobeat Presents Hi-NRG '80s.
- In 1991, the Hot Productions label released their greatest hits album, These Memories: The Best of Oh Romeo.
