= Elfi Mikesch =

Austrian-German photographer, cinematographer and film director (born 1940)

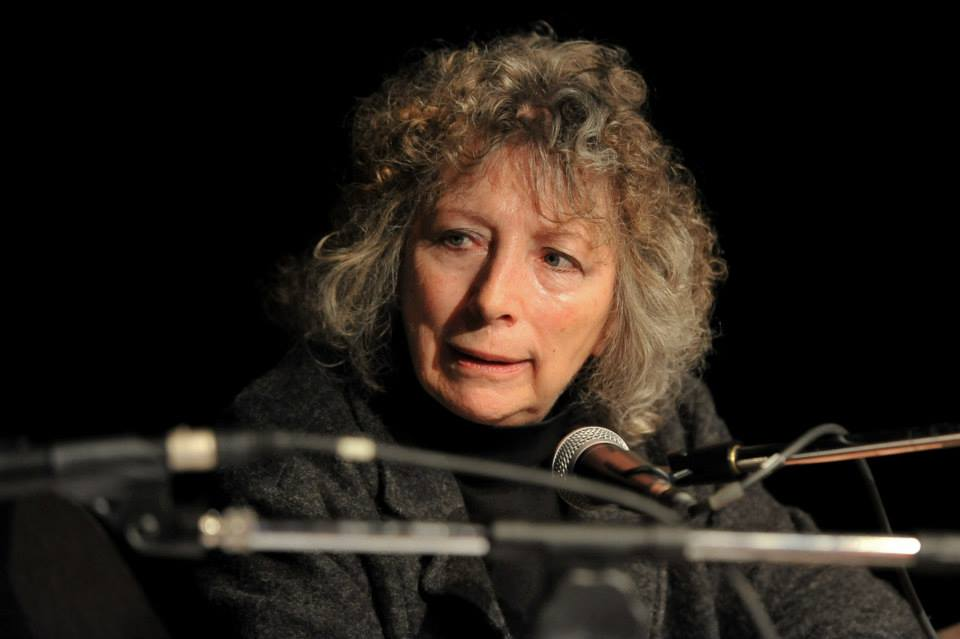
- Mikesch in 2013
- Born: Elfriede Mikesch; 31 May 1940 (age 86); Judenburg, Styria, Austria
- Occupations: Photographer; cinematographer; film director
- Years active: 1970–present
- Spouse: Fritz Mikesch (m. 1960)
- Awards: German Film Award (1978, 1980); German Camera Award (1986, 1992; honorary 2006); Friedrich Wilhelm Murnau Prize (2010); Teddy Award (special award, 2014)

Elfi Mikesch (born Elfriede Mikesch; 31 May 1940) is an Austrian-German photographer, cinematographer and film director. Regarded as a pioneer among camerawomen in German-language cinema, she is known for her decades-long collaborations with the directors Rosa von Praunheim, Werner Schroeter and Monika Treut, as well as for her own experimental and documentary films.

== Life and career ==
Mikesch was born in Judenburg, Styria, the daughter of a film projectionist, and completed an apprenticeship as a photographer before also working as a painter. In 1960, she married the painter and radio-play author Fritz Mikesch, with whom she moved from Innsbruck to Frankfurt am Main in 1963. There she met the filmmaker Rosa von Praunheim. In 1965, she relocated to West Berlin, where she worked for the publisher V. Magdalinski. In 1969, she and von Praunheim published Oh Muvie, an "anarchistic photo story" chronicling the Berlin underground.

Inspired by Edgar Allan Poe's short story "The Masque of the Red Death", Mikesch made her directorial debut in 1970 with a Super-8 short, Charisma. Eine Erinnerung an den Tod, which is now considered lost. In 1971, she worked for the first time as a cinematographer on Leidenschaften, directed by Rosa von Praunheim and filmed during a journey around the world with Fritz Mikesch. In 1972 she was responsible for make-up and costumes on Werner Schroeter's Salome, beginning a long collaboration in which she photographed numerous productions for Schroeter.

In 1983–84 Mikesch taught directing at the German Film and Television Academy Berlin (DFFB). She has been a member of the Akademie der Künste, Berlin (Film and Media Arts Section) since 1991, and has led camera seminars at the Berlin University of the Arts.

She won the German Film Award for her documentaries Ich denke oft an Hawaii (1978) and Execution. A Study of Mary (1980), and the German Camera Award for Schroeter's The Rose King (1986) and Malina (1992), followed by that prize's honorary award for her life's work in 2006. In 2010 she was honoured together with Werner Schroeter with the Friedrich Wilhelm Murnau Prize, recognising their work. At the 2014 Berlinale she received a special Teddy Award for her artistic life's work.

On the occasion of Mikesch's eightieth birthday in 2020, Rosa von Praunheim published the photo book vis-à-vis about his long-time companion, who served as cinematographer on more than twenty of his films. The Filmarchiv Austria honoured her with a retrospective of several weeks at the Metro Kinokulturhaus in Vienna in January-February 2022, which also included films by von Praunheim and Schroeter photographed by Mikesch.

== Filmography ==
- 1970: Charisma. Eine Erinnerung an den Tod (camera, director; lost)
- 1972: Leidenschaften (camera)
- 1978: Ich denke oft an Hawaii (camera, director, screenplay, editing)
- 1979: Execution. A Study of Mary (camera, director, screenplay, producer, editing)
- 1980: Was soll'n wir denn machen ohne den Tod (camera, director, screenplay, editing)
- 1981: Zechmeister (consultant)
- 1982: Macumba (director)
- 1982: Im Jahr der Schlange (camera)
- 1983: Canale grande (camera)
- 1983: Die blaue Distanz (camera, director, screenplay)
- 1983: Das Frühstück der Hyäne (camera, director, screenplay)
- 1984: Horror Vacui (camera)
- 1985: Seduction: The Cruel Woman (camera, director, screenplay, producer)
- 1986: A Virus Knows No Morals (camera)
- 1986: Der Rosenkönig (camera)
- 1987: Anita: Dances of Vice (camera)
- 1988: Die Jungfrauenmaschine (camera, producer)
- 1989: Marocain (camera, director, screenplay)
- 1990: Die Aids-Trilogie: Feuer unterm Arsch – Vom Leben und Sterben schwuler Männer in Berlin (camera)
- 1991: Malina (camera)
- 1991: A Idade Maior (camera)
- 1991: The Party: Nature Morte (camera)
- 1991: My Father Is Coming (camera)
- 1992: Female Misbehavior (camera)
- 1994: Hey Stranger (camera)
- 1994: Let's Talk About Sex (camera)
- 1994: Soldaten Soldaten (director)
- 1995: Out of America (camera)
- 1996: Gefährliche Orte – Bombenleger (camera, director)
- 1996: Poussières d'amour – Abfallprodukte der Liebe (camera)
- 1997: Daily Chicken (camera)
- 1997: Verrückt bleiben – verliebt bleiben (camera, director, screenplay)
- 1998: Life, Love & Celluloid (camera)
- 1999: Gendernauts (camera)
- 1999: Der Einstein des Sex (camera)
- 2000: Für mich gab's nur noch Fassbinder (camera)
- 2001: Mon Paradis – Der Winterpalast (camera, director, screenplay)
- 2001: Die Markus Family (camera, director, screenplay)
- 2001: Kriegerin des Lichts (camera)
- 2001: Denk ich an Deutschland – Ein Fremder (camera)
- 2002: Deux (camera)
- 2002: Ich kann das schon! (camera)
- 2003: Ich bin der Eiffelturm (series Fremde Kinder, camera)
- 2003: Les parents terribles (camera)
- 2004: Passion Hölderlin (camera)
- 2005: Christoph Schlingensief und seine Filme (camera)
- 2005: Den Tigerfrauen wachsen Flügel (camera)
- 2006: Brinkmanns Zorn (camera)
- 2006: Hahnemanns Medizin (camera, director)
- 2007: Meine Mütter – Spurensuche in Riga (camera)
- 2008: Tote Schwule – Lebende Lesben (camera)
- 2008: Zisternen – Istanbuls versunkene Paläste (director)
- 2008: Stark fürs Leben (camera)
- 2008: Spielzone – Im Sog virtueller Welten (camera)
- 2011: Mondo Lux – Die Bilderwelten des Werner Schroeter (director)
- 2012: Der Schmetterlingsjäger – 37 Karteikarten zu Nabokov (camera)
- 2014: Fieber (director, screenplay)
- 2015: Härte (camera)
- 2017: Überleben in Neukölln (camera)
- 2019: Ich bin Anastasia (camera)
- 2022: Die Strasse als Erzählung (director, camera, screenplay)
- 2024: Krieg oder Frieden (director, screenplay)
