= Two Mothers =

Two Mothers may refer to:

- Two Mothers (Faivre), an 1888 painting by Maxime Faivre
- Two Mothers (1916 film), a 1916 American short film
- Two Mothers (1921 film), a 1921 Czech film
- Two Mothers (2007 film), a 2007 German documentary
- Adoration (2013 film), a 2013 film originally released under the title Two Mothers
- Two Mothers (TV series), a 2014 Korean television series
- Zwei Mütter (English: Two mothers), a 1957 East German film

== See also ==
- Judgment of Solomon
