= Ichgola Androgyn =

German actor and LGBTQ+ activist (1960–2026)

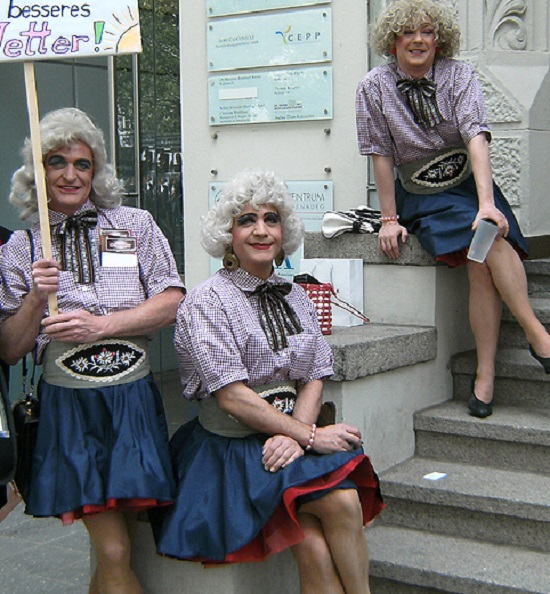
- Ichgola (left) in 2010
- Born: Bernd Boßmann; 21 October 1960; Appeldorn, North Rhine-Westphalia, West Germany
- Died: 9 November 2026 (aged 66); Berlin, Germany
- Occupations: Actor; Activist

Ichgola Androgyn (21 October 1960 – 9 November 2026), stage name of Bernd Boßmann, was a German actor and LGBTQ+ activist.

== Life and career ==
Born in Appeldorn on 21 October 1960, Boßmann took acting and acrobatics classes in their youth. Under the pseudonyms Theodor van den Boom and Ichgola Androgyn, they directed stage productions in West Berlin, notably at the Theater des Westens, the Schiller Theater, the Maxim Gorki Theater, and the SchwuZ Queer Club. They also directed shows in Cologne. In 1992, they starred in the film I Am My Own Woman, portraying Charlotte von Mahlsdorf. In the 2000s, they joined numerous cross-dressing troupes.

Alongside activists such as BeV StroganoV, Ovo Maltine, and Tima die Göttliche, Ichgola created an activist group of drag performers called "Les Tuxx". They worked to secure funds for projects dedicated to the fight against HIV/AIDS. In 1987, Ichgola founded HIV e.V. alongside a group of nurses to provide care for those infected with the disease. They also organized fundraising concerts, including the first of its kind in East Berlin. In September 2006, they founded a café inside of the Alter St.-Matthäus-Kirchhof cemetery. It was featured in the 2016 film Garten der Sternenkinder, as the cemetery was a final resting place for many gay men. From 2009 to 2014, they led the cross-dressing troupe "O-TonArt", located on the first floor of the building that had previously housed the SchwuZ Queer Club. After that, they sold lemonade, with benefits intended for social causes.

Androgyn died on 9 November 2026, at the age of 66.

== Filmography ==
- A Virus Knows No Morals (1986)
- Anita: Dances of Vice (1987)
- I Am My Own Woman (1992)
- Neurosia: 50 Years of Perversity (1995)
