= Joaquín La Habana =

Cuban dancer, singer and performer

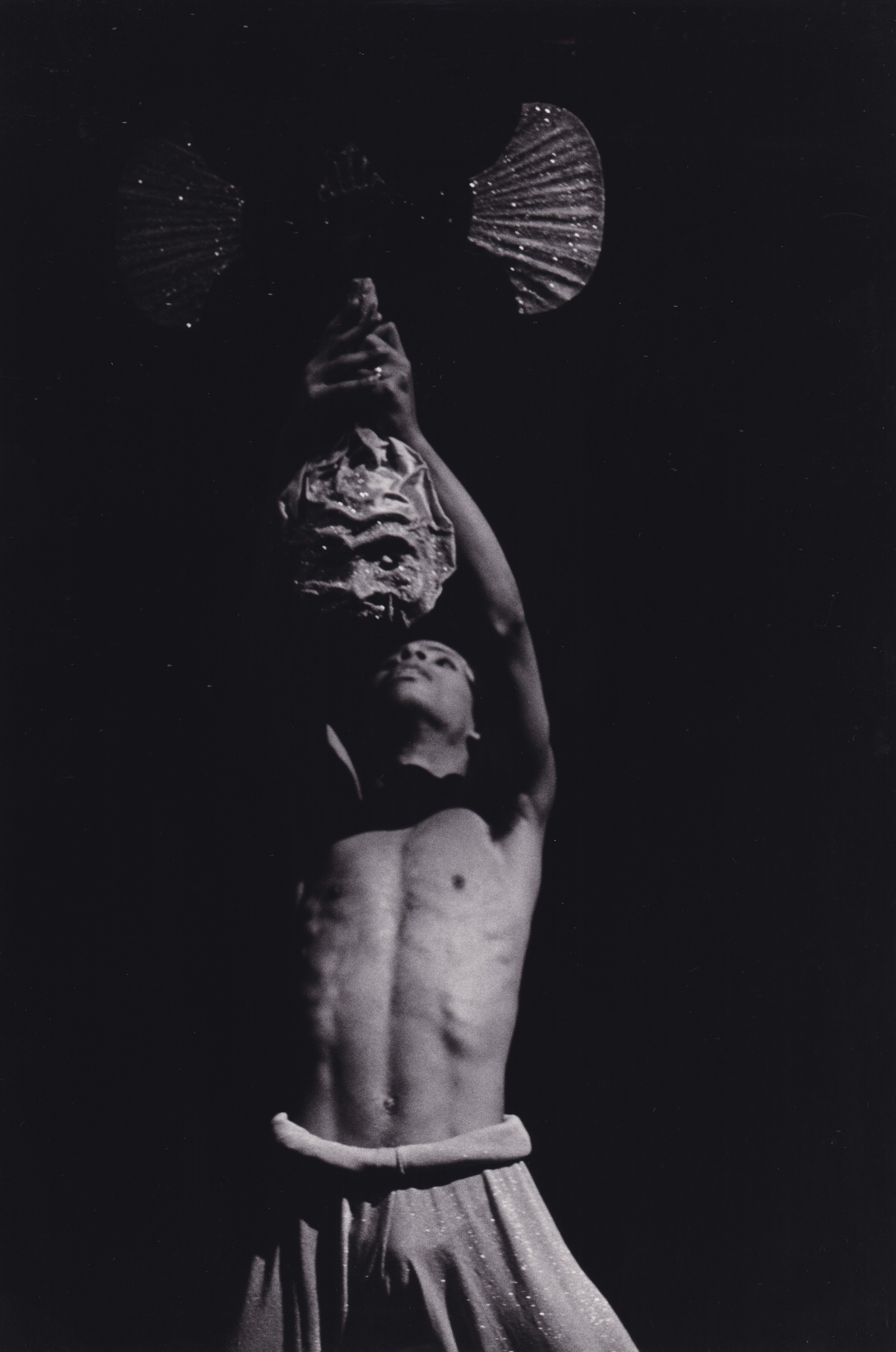
- Habana in 1986
- Born: Havana, Cuba

Joaquín La Habana is a queer singer, dancer, actor and drag artist.

== Early life and education ==
Joaquín La Habana was born in Havana, Cuba. In 1966 he emigrated to the US, studying music and dance at Elma Lewis School of Fine Arts (1967–1971) and Boston Conservatory at Berklee (1969–1971), with teachers such as James Truitte, Geoffrey Holder, Talley Beatty and others.

== Career ==
In the early 1970s La Habana moved to New York, where he took small roles as a dancer on Broadway and in musical films such as Hair and The Wiz. At the same time, he began to explore the genre of drag, and for a short period lived a female identity in his everyday life. He performed in the Palm Casino Revue and at Studio 54 with numbers alluding to artists such as Josephine Baker. La Habana worked with the queer theater avantgarde of La MaMa E.T.C., with artists such as Charles Ludlam and Jack Smith. La Habana starred in the queer experimental film Love Thing.

Since 1981, La Habana has lived in Berlin. He performed with the Chez Nous theater, performed in stagings of La Cage aux Folles, and in various films of Rosa von Praunheim, notably City of Lost Souls.

In the 1990s he started working on a series of performances exploring his Afro-Caribbean heritage, which he presented in venues such as Ethnological Museum of Berlin, Haus der Kulturen der Welt and Werkstadt der Kulturen, as well as in the frame of Karneval der Kulturen.

La Habana practices as a Santéria priest and regularly teaches workshops and classes in Afro-Caribbean music and dance.

== Selected filmography ==
- 1972: Joaquín (documentary) by Serge Raoul
- 1978: The Wiz by Sidney Lumet
- 1979: Hair by Miloš Forman
- 1980 (2012): Love Thing by Michael Mannetta
- 1981: Fort Apache, The Bronx by Daniel Petrie
- 1983: City of Lost Souls by Rosa von Praunheim
- 1984: Horror Vacui by Rosa von Praunheim
- 1984: Drama in Blond by Lothar Lambert
- 1986: A Virus Knows No Morals by Rosa von Praunheim
- 2007: The Art of Seduction by Bernhard P. Beutler
- 2013: Joaquín La Habana – Living Between Worlds (documentary) by Bernhard P. Beutler
- 2017: Survival in Neukölln by Rosa von Praunheim
