= Hella von Sinnen =

German comedian and television presenter

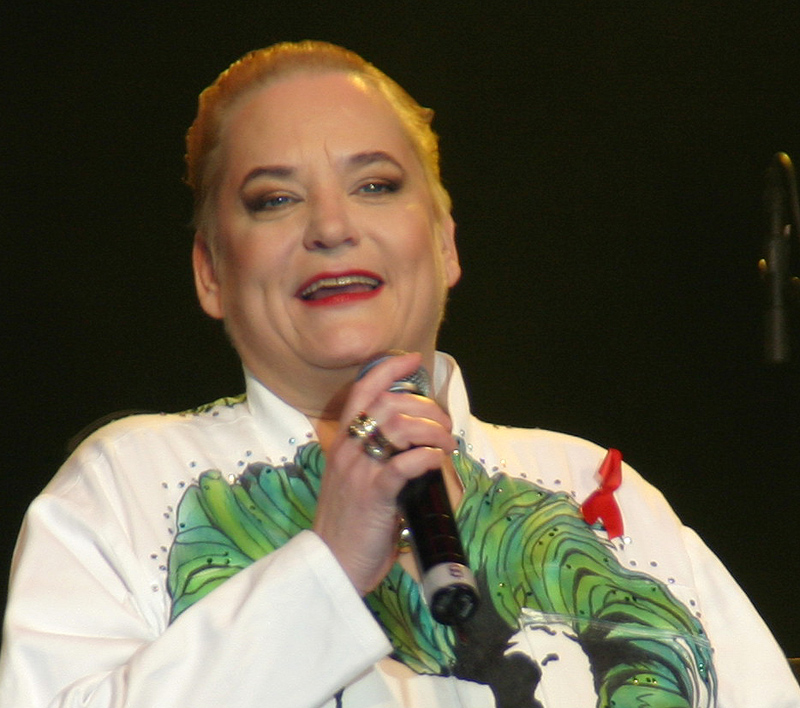
- Von Sinnen at a charity concert in Cologne in late 2006
- Born: Hella Kemper; 2 February 1959 (age 66); Gummersbach, West Germany
- Occupations: Comedian, television presenter
- Partner: Cornelia Scheel (1991–2015)

Hella Kemper (born 2 February 1959), known professionally as Hella von Sinnen (lit. Hella out of her mind, making pun of the aristocratic "von"), is a German entertainer and television presenter. She has been a regular on several TV shows on German private channels, mainly RTL. Von Sinnen has been socially committed to people with HIV for many years and played the nurse Rita in Rosa von Praunheim's film A Virus Knows No Morals (1986), one of the first feature films about AIDS.

== Career ==
Since the show's first air date on 11 January 2003, von Sinnen has served as one of two (until 2011 together with Bernhard Hoëcker and since 2017 with Wigald Boning) permanent panel members of the weekly Sat.1 improvisational comedy show Genial daneben (lit. ingeniously off the mark). In the show, von Sinnen, Hoëcker and three varying comedians try to answer strange questions sent in by the audience.

Since 2018, she is a panel member of the spin-off Genial daneben – Das Quiz. Since April 2017 she hosts the ComicTalk on the fee-paying, only German Online-Portal Massengeschmack-TV.

== Personal life ==
Von Sinnen supports same-sex marriage in Germany. She was in a long-time relationship with Cornelia Scheel, the adopted daughter of Walter Scheel who was the President of Germany from 1974 to 1979.

== Selected filmography ==
- A Virus Knows No Morals (1986), as nurse Rita
- The Lion King (1994), as Shenzi (voice, German Dub)
- Killer Condom (1996), as Detective Sally
- Venus and Mars (2001), as Bertha
- Crazy About Paris (2002), as Blumenverkäuferin
- Home on the Range (2004), as Maggie (voice, German Dub)
- Neues vom Wixxer (2007), as Sister Stephanie
- Sunshine Barry & The Disco Worms (2007), as Donna (voice)
- Mr. Peabody & Sherman (2014) as Mrs. Grunion (voice)
- Ein Schnupfen hätte auch gereicht (2017)

== Awards ==
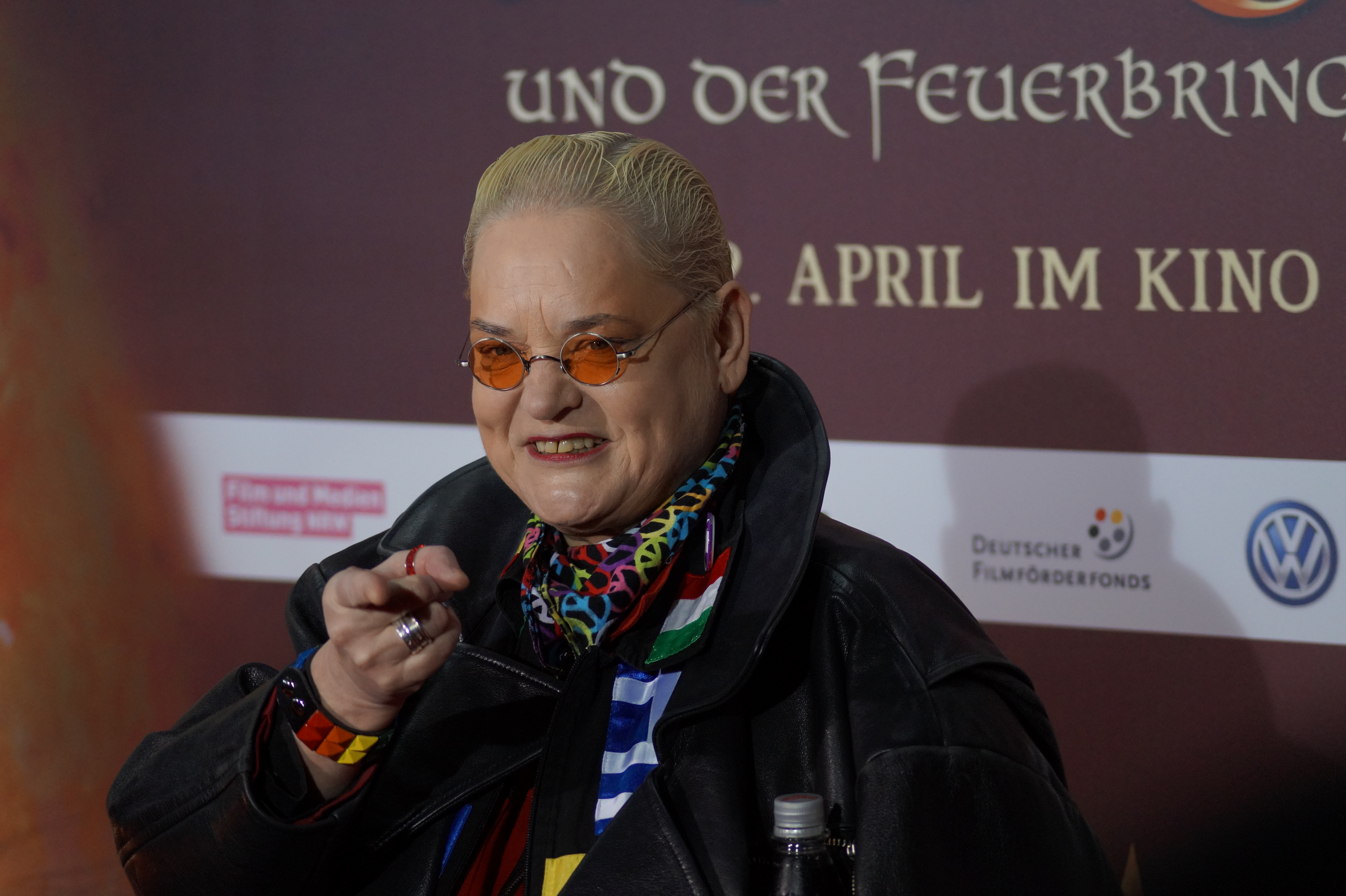
Von Sinnen in 2015

- 1990 – Bambi
- 2006 – German Comedy Award – Best Comedian
- 2007 – Spectacle Wearer of the Year

As a permanent panel member of Genial daneben (together with Bernhard Hoëcker and Hugo Egon Balder):

- 2003 and 2006 – German Comedy Award – Best Comedy Show
- 2004 – German Television Award – Best Entertainment Show / Best Presentation of an Entertainment Show
