= Barbara Ossenkopp =

German actress (1943–2021)

- Born: 1943; Lüneburg, Province of Hanover, Germany
- Died: 28 May 2021 (aged 78); Jakarta, Indonesia
- Occupations: Nightclub dancer; actress; animal rights activist

Barbara Ossenkopp (1943 – 28 May 2021) was a German nightclub dancer, actress and animal rights activist. As "Chinesen-Babs", she became known locally in the Hamburg entertainment district of St. Pauli in the 1960s. She later worked in an orangutan sanctuary in Indonesia.

== Early life ==
Ossenkopp grew up in petty bourgeois circumstances in the city of Lüneburg. In 1961, she moved to Hamburg to work as a decorator.

== Career ==
=== St. Pauli ===
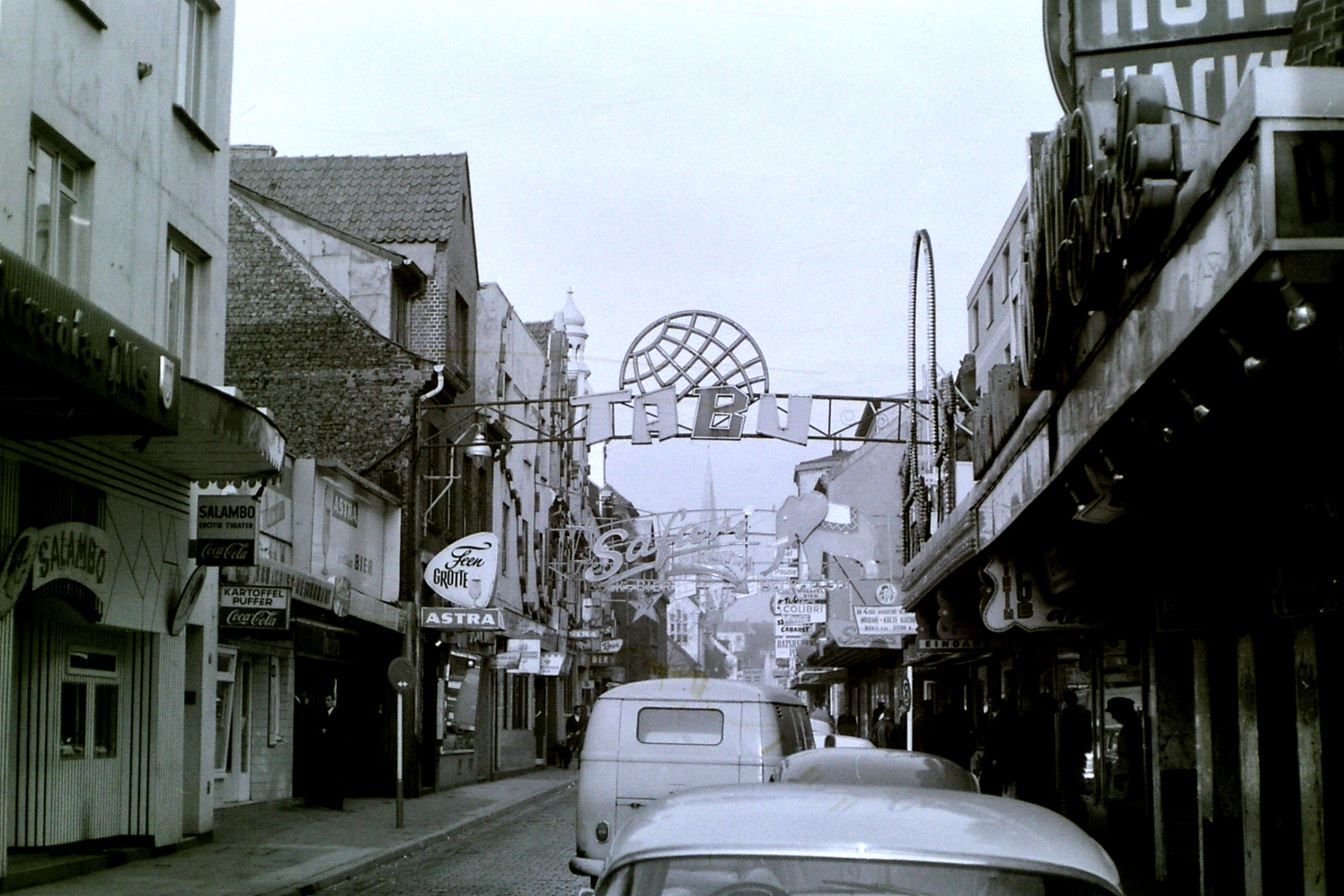
Salambo nightclub in the Großen Freiheit (1968)

Ossenkopp got to know the bar and club scene in St. Pauli through a roommate of her shared apartment in the early 1960s. After working as a barmaid for a short time, she became a striptease dancer at René Durand's Salambo nightclub on the Große Freiheit. During her appearances, she often had made-up eyes and wore a dark wig, which, together with her high cheekbones, created an Asian appearance. This resulted in the name "Chinesen-Babs", under which she soon became known beyond the borders of St. Pauli. Photographer Günter Zint, a long-time companion, described Ossenkopp as a vamp and femme fatale and her role model was Anita Berber, a dancer from Berlin in the 1920s.

=== Film and television ===
After a while, Ossenkopp was also noticed by the media. She received commissions from the Norddeutscher Rundfunk, for which she interviewed stars such as Paul Newman and Sean Connery.

In the early 1970s, Ossenkopp had contact with the Hamburg scene, which included Udo Lindenberg. When Lindenberg presented his song Alles Klar auf der Andrea Doria on the ZDF show Disco in 1974, Ossenkopp was involved in the performance as an extra. At the same time, she received her first roles as an actress in German feature and television films. After her debut in an episode of the crime drama series Dem Täter auf der Spur, she initially played mainly supporting roles in erotic comedies. In one of these productions, she was explicitly announced as "Chinesen-Babs". On the other hand, she had roles in films by Herbert Achternbusch, Christel Buschmann and Klaus Lemke. With her appearance in the "Hamburg film" Gibbi Westgermany, she set herself apart from the erotic genre in 1979. Ossenkopp had her last role in 1987 in the second episode of the television series Mozart und Meisel by Peter Hajek, with whom she was in a relationship for six years in the 1980s.

=== Animal rights activist in Indonesia ===
After the relationship with Hajek ended, Ossenkopp moved to Indonesia. Initially, she lived in Bali, where she earned her living as a painter. In 2002, she met Ulrike Freifrau von Mengden in Jakarta, who had been looking after orphaned orangutans in Ragunan Zoo for decades. Ossenkopp became von Mengden's assistant and worked with her for 18 years.

== Final years and death ==
After von Mengden died in January 2020, Ossenkopp became impoverished. In the past few years, she had had Parkinson's disease and leukemia. Financial support from friends from Hamburg, including Günter Zint and Udo Lindenberg, enabled a therapy to be carried out in Jakarta in the spring of 2021, which seemed to promise success. Before she could start her planned return trip to Hamburg, Ossenkopp was diagnosed with COVID-19 and died from complications of the disease on 28 May at the age of 78 in a hospital in Jakarta. She was buried in a cemetery in the city. She was survived by her daughter.

== Filmography ==
=== Film ===
- 1973: Wer einmal in das Posthorn stößt
- 1973: Das darf doch nicht wahr sein
- 1974: Dorothea's Revenge
- 1975: Die sündige Kleinstadt
- 1980: Gibbi Westgermany
- 1981: Das letzte Loch
- 1985: Seduction: The Cruel Woman
- 1986: Now or Never

=== Television ===
- 1972: Dem Täter auf der Spur
- 1974: Paul
- 1987: Mozart und Meisel
