= City of Lost Souls (1983 film) =

1983 film directed by Rosa von Praunheim

- Theatrical release poster
- Directed by: Rosa von Praunheim
- Written by: Rosa von Praunheim
- Screenplay by: Rosa von Praunheim
- Produced by: Rosa von Praunheim
- Starring: Jayne County; Angie Stardust; Joaquín La Habana; Lotti Huber; Helga Goetze; Tara O'Hara; Judith Flex; Tron von Hollywood
- Cinematography: Stephan Köster
- Music by: Holger Münzer
- Release date: 1983
- Country: West Germany
- Languages: German; English

City of Lost Souls (German: Stadt Der Verlorenen Seelen) is a 1983 German musical film directed by Rosa von Praunheim and performed by drag queens, travesty artists and transgender people. The film received international attention and became a cult movie beyond the LGBT community.

== Plot ==
City of Lost Souls is a primarily fictional narrative about the lives of US cabaret performers and other immigrants in Berlin. The performers struggle for social recognition and professional prospects, bringing autobiographical and authentic aspects of their biographies and life experiences into the plot.

== Awards ==
- 1983: Nomination for the Gold Hugo at the Chicago International Film Festival

== Reception ==
In the context of the time, the transgender film was praised as revolutionary: "This riotous and massively ahead-of-its-time intersectional queer-punk musical has gone on to greatly influence transgender politics." (Australian Centre for the Moving Image) Phil Ieropoulos, Professor of Directing at Buckinghamshire New University, wrote in a treatise on art films: "Featuring trans and genderqueer characters and drag superstars of the era, but also a bizarre structure that alternates between interviews, voice-overs, songs and performance art, City of Lost Souls is one of the coolest films you'll ever see." "[...] Praunheim succeeds in creating a space in which transgender women and sexual pluralism are celebrated without violence or rebuke." (Another Gaze Film Journal) "This 1983 trans punk musical is the instant cult classic [...]". (Mary and Leigh Block Museum of Art)
