= Positive (1990 film) =

- Directed by: Rosa von Praunheim
- Screenplay by: Rosa von Praunheim
- Produced by: Rosa von Praunheim; Phil Zwickler
- Starring: Larry Kramer; Michael Callen; Diamanda Galás
- Cinematography: Mike Kuchar; Elfi Mikesch; Evan Estern
- Edited by: Rosa von Praunheim; Mike Shephard
- Production company: Rosa Von Praunheim Filmproduktion
- Distributed by: First Run Features.
- Release date: 4 May 1990
- Running time: 60 minutes
- Countries: United States; West Germany
- Language: English

Positive is a 1990 documentary film directed, written and produced by Rosa von Praunheim. The film received international resonance.

== Plot ==
Positive is about how the gay community in New York City and its activists dealt with the AIDS crisis. The film's protagonists include AIDS activists Michael Callen, Larry Kramer and Diamanda Galás.

== Production notes ==
Positive is the first part of Rosa von Praunheim's AIDS Trilogy, followed by Silence = Death and Fire Under Your Ass. The opening credits state (in German) "In collaboration with Phil Zwickler, Robert Hilferty, Steven Weiss".

== Awards ==
- 1990: Queer Film Prize of the Berlin International Film Festival (together with Silence = Death)

== Reception ==
The Guardian called Silence = Death and Positive "the best AIDS films to date." The Los Angeles Times wrote: "Praunheim is just the man for the job he has taken on with Silence = Death and Positive: he has the breadth of vision, the compassion and the militance and, yes, the sense of humor necessary to tackle the AIDS epidemic in all its aspects."
