= Neurosia: 50 Years of Perversity =

- Theatrical release poster
- Directed by: Rosa von Praunheim
- Written by: Valentin Passoni
- Produced by: Rosa von Praunheim
- Starring: Désirée Nick; Lotti Huber; Evelyn Künneke; Luzi Kryn; Eva Ebner; Friedrich Steinhauer; Gertrud Mischwitzky; Ichgola Androgyn
- Narrated by: Rosa von Praunheim
- Cinematography: Lorenz Haarmann
- Edited by: Mike Shepard
- Music by: Alexander Kraut
- Release date: 2 November 1995
- Running time: 89 Minutes
- Country: Germany
- Language: German

Neurosia: 50 Years of Perversity (German: Neurosia - 50 Jahre pervers ) is a 1995 German film directed by Rosa von Praunheim.

The film was shown at the Chicago International Film Festival in 1995 and at the International Film Festival Rotterdam in 1996.

== Plot ==
An ironic life review of Rosa von Praunheim based on a fictional story about his murder. For a sensational story about the victim, an idiosyncratic TV reporter tries to unravel details about the director's life. Meanwhile, the police are groping in the dark trying to solve the case. But as always when it comes to the murder of a gay man, the officers are certain that the killer is to be found in the gay scene.

== Awards ==
- 1995: FIPRESCI Award at the Locarno International Film Festival
- 1996: Best Feature Film Award at the Torino Gay & Lesbian International Film Festival

== Reception ==
The journalist Allen Barra wrote: "Neurosia: 50 Years of Perversity is one of the funniest and most inventive German comedies ever made, a murder-mystery in a form of a mock-documentary." (The Star-Ledger)
