= The Bed Sausage =

- Directed by: Rosa von Praunheim
- Screenplay by: Rosa von Praunheim
- Produced by: Rosa von Praunheim/ZDF
- Starring: Luzi Kryn, Dietmar Kracht, Steven Adamczewski
- Cinematography: Bernd Upnmoor, Rosa von Praunheim
- Edited by: Gisela Bienert, Bernd Upnmoor, Rosa von Praunheim
- Release date: 1971
- Running time: 81 minutes
- Country: West Germany
- Language: German

The Bed Sausage (German: Die Bettwurst) is a 1971 West German camp film directed by Rosa von Praunheim. It became a cult film and was followed in 1975 by the sequel Berlin Bed Sausage.

The film was also shown in other European countries, but was never officially released in the United States. Nevertheless, it was occasionally shown at American art film festivals and in US art-house cinemas.

== Plot ==
The title The Bed Sausage refers to a small neck pillow that Luzi gives Dietmar for their first Christmas together. Luzi and Dietmar meet in the port city of Kiel and fall in love. She is an older middle-class secretary; he is a casual crook and hustler from Berlin. Both comically striving to live the bourgeois rituals they learned from their upbringing and adopted from the media and blissful television comedies. After a night of love, he helps her vacuum the house. They celebrate Christmas together and their life seems to be the purest idyll - cheesy and carefree. Suddenly, old criminal friends of Dietmar arrive and kidnap Luzi to force Dietmar to do something crooked with them again. In the style of a film parody, Dietmar shoots one of the criminals on the beach and flees with Luzi in a small sports plane towards an uncertain future, but the couple is overjoyed to be together again.

== Review ==
"As grotesque and entertaining as von Praunheim's trivial plot appears on screen, The Bed Sausage nonetheless has the qualities of a serious, well thought-out sociogram." - Der Spiegel "Produced with modest means and wholeheartedly embracing the camp aesthetic, an anarchic comedy about middle-class love in Kiel. What at first glance may seem like shrill triviality turns out to be a wide-awake sociogram modeled on US underground cinema." - Kino-Zeit "Avant-garde cinema also has its masters, its greatest in Germany: Rosa von Praunheim. His film The Bed Sausage, which premiered on ZDF, confirmed once again what his works Pink Workers on Golden Street and Sisters of the Revolution, which have already been shown at many festivals, characterise: A mixture of artistic inventiveness, social awareness and humour that is exceedingly rare in Germany." - Frankfurter Allgemeine Zeitung
