= Affengeil =

- Theatrical release poster
- Directed by: Rosa von Praunheim
- Screenplay by: Eva Ebner; Lotti Huber; Rosa von Praunheim
- Produced by: Rosa von Praunheim
- Starring: Lotti Huber; Rosa von Praunheim; Helga Sloop; Gertrud Mischwitky
- Cinematography: Klaus Janschewsky; Mike Kuchar
- Edited by: Mike Shephard
- Music by: Marran Gosov; Thomas Marquard
- Production company: Exportfilm Bischoff
- Distributed by: First Run Features
- Release date: 27 October 1990
- Running time: 87 minutes
- Country: West Germany
- Language: German

Affengeil (English title: Life is Like a Cucumber) is a 1990 German docudrama film by Rosa von Praunheim. The film was shown at the 1991 Toronto International Film Festival and 1992 at the Frameline Film Festival in San Francisco, among others.

== Plot ==
Film about the life of Lotti Huber, who was discovered by Rosa von Praunheim for cinema when she was almost 70 years old. The documentary shows the catastrophes and successes that Lotti experienced.

== Reception ==
"Lotti is an ingenious grotesque and a consummate performer." (The Motion Picture Guide, 1993) The German Frankfurter Allgemeine Zeitung wrote: "Praunheim's fictional documentaries or documentary fictions, however one may categorize the works of the auteur filmmaker, are characterized on the one hand by an amazingly self-deprecating sincerity and on the other hand by a deeply affectionate description of the people in his worlds. [...] Legendary are his portraits of the maternal muse Lotti Huber. He erected monuments to the extravagant actress, dancer and diseuse of the Berlin underground [...]."
