= Rent Boys =

- German theatrical release poster
- German: Die Jungs vom Bahnhof Zoo
- Directed by: Rosa von Praunheim
- Written by: Rosa von Praunheim, co-writer: Oliver Sechting
- Produced by: Rosa von Praunheim
- Starring: Sergiu Grimalschi; Peter Kern; Wolfgang Werner
- Cinematography: Nicolai Zoern; Lorenz Haarmann; Jens Paetzold; Dennis Paul; Thomas Ladenburg
- Edited by: Mike Shephard
- Music by: Andreas Wolter
- Production companies: Rosa von Praunheim Film produktion RBB; NDR production
- Distributed by: Basis-Film-Verleih GmbH
- Release date: 2011
- Running time: 86 minutes
- Country: Germany
- Languages: German; Romanian
- Budget: €140,000

Rent Boys (German: Die Jungs vom Bahnhof Zoo) is a 2011 German documentary film directed, written and produced by Rosa von Praunheim. The film was shown at the Berlin International Film Festival and the Queer Lisboa International Film Festival in 2011, for example.

== Plot ==
The realities of life of male prostitutes in Berlin are dealt with through interviews with young men who are or were sex workers. The film also gives an insight into the scene and the lives of these men. The film remains nonjudgmental and factual and shows the gay "hustler scene" as a social sub-milieu that is shaped by tragic fates as well as by everyday things and routines. Not only the direct sale of sexual services is discussed, but also other aspects of male prostitution such as poverty, drug addiction, mental stress, risk of sexually transmitted diseases, crime, migration, love and partnership. Innkeepers from bars where male sexworkers start their business, and clients of male prostitutes, such as the Austrian actor and director Peter Kern, also have their say.

== Production notes ==
When making the film, Rosa von Praunheim worked together with street workers from the association Hilfe-für-Jungs in Berlin, which provides socio-educational, psychological and medical services for male sexworkers.

The film has already been shown over 25 times on German television.

== Awards ==
- 2012: Grimme-Preis
- 2013: Nominated for the "Best Documentary"-Award at the Merlinka Festival

== Reception ==
"Von Praunheim's questions are clear and not suggestive. The surprising openness of the boys gives an idea of the trust that the director enjoys in them and that is never abused in the film. This contributes greatly to authenticity." (Grimme-Preis Jury)
