= The death of the Princesse de Lamballe =

1908 painting by Maxime Faivre

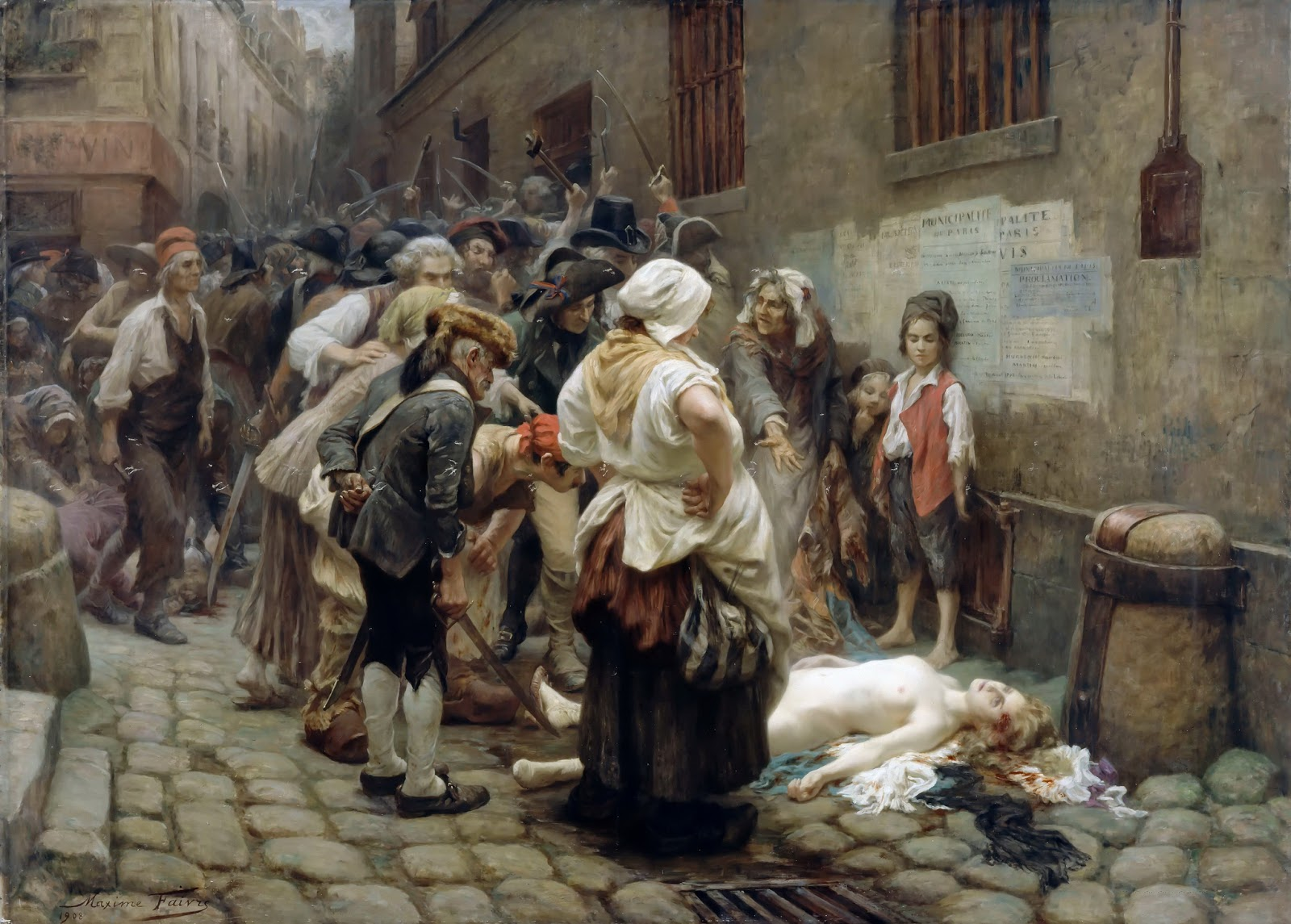
Death of the Princesse de Lamballe

The death of the Princesse de Lamballe (French: Mort de la princesse de Lamballe) is a painting by Maxime Faivre. It was first exhibited at the salon of 1908 and is currently at the Palace of Versailles.

== Provenance ==
The painting was bequeathed to the Palace of Versailles in 1942 by the daughter of the artist, Madame Charles Levade. it is currently in the Musée de la Révolution française in Vizille. Madame Levade also bequeathed a study for the final painting, which is currently held in the fr: Musée Blanche Hoschedé-Monet in Vernon, Eure.

== Subject and composition ==
The subject of the painting, the Princesse de Lamballe, was the daughter-in-law of the Duke of Bourbon-Penthièvre, Grand Admiral of France and Lord of Vernon. She was also the favourite of queen Marie Antoinette and was imprisoned during the French Revolution. The princess was brutally killed in front of the gates of La Force prison in Paris during the September massacres. The episode illustrated is based on the account by Jules Michelet in his Histoire de la révolution française.

The painting depicts a street scene in the aftermath of her execution, with a crowd of men and women surrounding the naked body of the princess lying dead on the ground. While a working-class woman in an apron and clogs watches, her hands on her hips, another woman dressed similarly gestures towards the body with one hand while holding in the other a cloth to cover it. Only in the background do the torturers' swords appear. Faivre carefully avoids showing the decapitation itself, which would have diminished the people in their fight for justice. The artist contrasts the purity of the naked woman's body with the grimy roughness of the Parisian working class.

== Critical reception ==
The composition draws the eye towards the idealised, pale, white body of the dead aristocrat serves as a kind of nostalgic symbol of the overthrown ancien regime. In contrast with the classical ideal form of her body, the crowd appears grotesque and repulsive.
