= Seduction: The Cruel Woman =

1985 West German film

- Seduction: The Cruel Woman DVD cover
- Directed by: Elfi Mikesch; Monika Treut
- Screenplay by: Elfi Mikesch; Monika Treut
- Edited by: Renate Merck
- Music by: Marran Gosov
- Production company: Hyena Films
- Distributed by: First Run Features (USA)
- Release date: February 22, 1985 (Berlin International Film Festival)
- Running time: 84 minutes
- Country: West Germany
- Language: German

Seduction: The Cruel Woman (Verführung: Die grausame Frau) is a 1985 West German film, directed by Elfi Mikesch and Monika Treut, who both co-wrote the screenplay. The character Wanda is portrayed by Mechthild Großmann. The film was inspired by Leopold von Sacher-Masoch's Venus in Furs.

== Synopsis ==
Wanda is a dominatrix who runs a gallery in Hamburg. She lures men and women of all types into her sadomasochistic world where audiences pay for the privilege of seeing her humiliate her slaves. The end is an ultimate mix of eros and thanatos.

And when she is eventually gunned down, not by her American female lover whom she turns into an assistant-Mistress and not by her older tender shoe-fetishist motherly concerned lover either, but by — of all people — her husband (who is also her slave), the supreme joy on her face is absolutely ineffable.

— Miodrag Kojadinović, "Seduction: The Cruel Woman I Could Have Been", Angles magazine, Vancouver, January 1994

== Cast ==
- Mechthild Großmann as Wanda
- Udo Kier as Gregor
- Sheila McLaughlin as Justine
- Carola Regnier as Caren
- Peter Weibel as Herr Maehrsch, Journalist
- Georgette Dee as Friederike
- Barbara Ossenkopp: Leila
- Daniela Ziegler: Mother

== Film Festivals ==
The movie was shown at the following film festivals, among others:

- 1985 Berlin International Film Festival, Forum
- 1985 San Francisco International Lesbian and Gay Film Festival

== See also ==
- Sadism and masochism in fiction
