= Army of Lovers or Revolt of the Perverts =

1979 West German documentary film

- Theatrical release poster
- Directed by: Rosa von Praunheim
- Screenplay by: Rosa von Praunheim
- Produced by: Rosa von Praunheim; Michael Gramberg
- Starring: Fred Halstead; Troy Perry; John Rechy; Grace Jones; Michael Kerns
- Cinematography: Rosa von Praunheim; Lloyd Williams
- Edited by: Rosa von Praunheim; Mike Shephard
- Production company: Rosa von Praunheim Filmproduktion
- Distributed by: Rosa von Praunheim Filmproduktion
- Release date: 4 May 1979; (West Germany)
- Running time: 107 minutes
- Country: West Germany
- Languages: German; English

Army of Lovers or Revolt of the Perverts (German: Armee der Liebenden oder Aufstand der Perversen) is a 1979 West German documentary film directed by Rosa von Praunheim.

The film features interviews, photo montages, and footage of marches and rallies. Among those interviewed and who offered commentary include Fred Halstead, Troy Perry, John Rechy, Grace Jones and Arthur Bell.

== Synopsis ==
The film offers a subjective view of the gay movement in America, and examines the progress of what Praunheim sees as a losing battle. It takes a hard look at political and social extremes within the movement.

The film features interviews, photo montages, and footage of marches and rallies. Among those interviewed include: a gay Nazi, gay pornography film stars, people from the Gay Activists Alliance, National Gay Task Force, Mattachine Society and Daughters of Bilitis.

Mexican novelist John Rechy would only agree to an interview from the rear, he refused to have his face shown in the film. Rechy defended gay men having casual sex against the "director's contention that what is hurting the gay men's movement is the obsession with 'discos, baths and orgy bars'."

Praunheim criticized his fellow auteur directors in the film, specifically calling out Rainer Werner Fassbinder as "selling out to the system". Rosa von Praunheim filmed his students filming a gay porn star performing fellatio on him so they would have incendiary footage for a film project.

== Cast ==
- Fred Halstead
- Troy Perry
- Arthur Bell
- John Briggs
- Anita Bryant
- Gordon Guy
- Harry Hay
- Grace Jones
- Rose Jordan
- Sarah Montgomery
- John Rechy
- John Silva
- Raibow Silverfire
- Bruce Voeller
- Michael Kerns

== Reception ==
Bruce Balley from The Montreal Gazette thought the film was "openly propagandistic, pushing unashamedly for the radical assertion of gay rights; several scenes are highly explicit depictions of homosexual acts and they seem to serve no purpose beyond simply sustaining the interest of an overtly homosexual audience." British linguist Kenneth MacKinnon argues that the film's title "indicates its oppositional stance by its appropriation of sensationalist tabloid descriptions of the gays who are featured in the film — boldly announcing its subject matter but also disarming prejudice and subverting homophobic discourse by foregrounding it in the alien context provided by a homosexual ambience."

Chris Auty from Time Out said "politically it seems suspect; and the crew clearly enjoyed making it a lot more than an audience will enjoy watching it." Author Raymond Murray opined that it is a "controversial film that documents the American gay liberation movement ... but Praunheim is much more interested in the people running the show, what he sees as an increasingly fractured leadership."

Film historian Vito Russo wrote "heavy hand is at work everywhere in the film; there is no pretense to objectivity, even toward internal gay politics." He further opined that scenes in the film that "depict effeminate behavior, the macho gay clone look and the cult worship of superstar women by gay men give rise to violently conflicting emotions ... but are never fully discussed by the filmmaker."

Canadian film critic Thomas Waugh wrote "this is by no means an objective journalistic survey; the narrator minces no words when it comes to the 'conservative, elitist National Gay Task Force', and deftly satirizes gay religion, civil rights organizing, and the commercialism of ghetto culture." American film critic Kevin Thomas stated it is a "rambling but vital and comprehensive documentary, culminating in a notorious — at the time — X–rated sequence."

== Awards ==
- 1979: Nomination for the Gold Hugo at the Chicago International Film Festival

== See also ==
- Cinema of Germany
- Gay liberation
- Gay Liberation Front
- History of gay men in the United States
- LGBTQ history in the United States
- List of LGBT rights organizations
- List of LGBTQ-related films of 1979
