= Erotique =

- Film poster
- Directed by: Lizzie Borden; Monika Treut; Clara Law; Ana Maria Magalhães
- Written by: Lizzie Borden; Susie Bright; Monika Treut; Eddie Ling-Ching Fong
- Story by: Lizzie Borden
- Produced by: Christopher Wood; Vicky Herman; Monika Treut; Michael Sombetzki; Teddy Robin; Eddie Ling-Ching Fong
- Cinematography: Larry Banks; Elfi Mikesch; Arthur Wong
- Edited by: Richard Fields; Steve Brown; Jill Bilcock
- Music by: Andrew Belling; Tats Lau
- Production companies: Tedpoly Films; Nova Era Produções de Arte Ltda.; Race the Wild Wind Inc.; Trigon Film
- Release date: May 14, 1994 (Cannes Film Festival)
- Running time: 93 minutes
- Countries: United States; Germany
- Languages: English; Cantonese; French; Portuguese

Erotique is a 1994 German-American anthology drama film directed by Lizzie Borden, Monika Treut, Clara Law and Ana Maria Magalhães.

== Cast ==
=== Let's Talk About Love ===
- Kamala Lopez as Rosie
- Bryan Cranston as Dr. Robert Stern
- Liane Curtis as Murohy
- Wade Dominguez as Dream Sequence Lover

=== Taboo Parlor ===
- Priscilla Barnes as Claire
- Camilla Søeberg as Jukia
- Michael Carr as Victor
- Peter Kern as Franz
- Marianne Sägebrecht as Hilde

=== Wonton Soup ===
- Tim Lounibos as Adrian
- Hayley Man as Ann
- Choi Hark-kin as Uncle

== Reception ==
On the review aggregator website Rotten Tomatoes, 0% of 7 critics' reviews are positive. Owen Gleiberman of Entertainment Weekly gave the film a C, asking "[w]hy do so many feminist movies about sexuality turn out to be as schematic and hostile as low-grade porn?", and describing each segment as finding "its way toward a thin, didactic kicker..."
