= Two Mothers (2007 film) =

- Theatrical release poster
- Directed by: Rosa von Praunheim
- Written by: Rosa von Praunheim
- Produced by: Rosa von Praunheim.
- Starring: Rosa von Praunheim; Gertrud Mischwitzky; Astrid Ruschlau; Ludwig Norz; Anita Kugler; Chris Kraus; Marģers Vestermanis
- Cinematography: Elfi Mikesch
- Edited by: Mike Shepard
- Music by: Andreas Wolter
- Production companies: Rosa von Praunheim Filmproduktion; Rundfunk Berlin Brandenburg, Hessischer Rundfunk
- Release date: 27 October 2007
- Running time: 87 minutes
- Country: Germany
- Languages: German, Latvian, English

Two Mothers (German: Meine Mütter – Spurensuche in Riga) is a 2007 German documentary film directed by Rosa von Praunheim. The film was shown at the Gothenburg Film Festival and at the Buenos Aires International Festival of Independent Cinema in 2008, among others.

== Plot ==
It was not until 2000 that Rosa von Praunheim learned from his then 94-year-old mother that he had been adopted. Only after the death of his beloved adoptive mother did von Praunheim set out to find traces of his biological parents. The exciting research leads him to the central prison of Riga in Latvia.

== Production notes ==
Two Mothers was a hit in German television.

== Awards ==
- 2008: Nomination für den Jury-Award at the Tribeca Film Festival
- 2009: German Biography Prize
- 2010: Nomination for the Grimme-Preis

== Reception ==
"The result is extremely exciting - not only as a skilfully staged journey through time to the 1940s, but also as a detective's search for clues, which - after long months without results - suddenly opens the door to the past via a small detail." (Männer-Lifestylemagazin)
