= Gendernauts =

Gendernauts: A Journey Through Shifting Identities
- Directed by: Monika Treut
- Produced by: Monika Treut
- Starring: Susan Stryker, Texas Tomboy, Annie Sprinkle, Max Wolf Valerio, Hida Viloria
- Edited by: Eric Schefter
- Music by: Georg Kajanus, Veronika Klaus
- Release date: 1999
- Running time: 86 minutes
- Countries: United States, Germany
- Language: English

Gendernauts: A Journey Through Shifting Identities is a 1999 film by Monika Treut featuring Sandy Stone, Texas Tomboy, Susan Stryker, and Hida Viloria. It shows us a group of artists in San Francisco who live between the poles of conventional gender identities.

== Release dates ==
The film was first screened at the Berlin International Film Festival in February 1999. The film opened in Germany on March 10, 1999. The opening date for the film in the United States was February 4, 2000. To celebrate the 30th anniversary of the Teddy Awards, the film has been selected to be shown at the 66th Berlin International Film Festival in February 2016.

== Film locations ==
Gendernauts was filmed on location, in San Francisco, California.

== Synopsis ==
Told through the narration of Sandy Stone, who acts as a sort of tour guide, the film documents the lives of a group of transgender individuals, and one intersex individual, living in San Francisco, California. The narration provided by Stone is cut with interviews that develop and illustrate the ideas and themes she discusses in her vignettes. The film is shot on location in San Francisco, with the interviews of the subjects taking place in their natural settings and surroundings including their homes, offices, and the streets of San Francisco. The film explains, through the lives of its subjects, both the social and practical changes and decisions necessary for them to endure in order to live their lives as they see fit on the edge of traditional gender roles. The idea of gender neutrality is promoted throughout the film. Gender is not a characteristic that should be used to define a person. The film also shows how the subjects all interact with one another in the transgender subculture of San Francisco.

== Cast ==
- Sandy Stone, narrator.
- Susan Stryker: Stryker is a trans woman. She is a noted author and historian, with a focus on transgender history. Her research also focuses on San Francisco as a mecca for transgender and queer people from across the world. Stryker received her PhD from the University of California, Berkeley in 1992.
- Texas Tomboy: Texas is a trans man addressed with the pronoun he. Texas was born in Houston, TX. Inspired by the San Francisco International LGBT Film Festival, Texas enrolled in the film school at San Francisco Art Institute. Texas is a video artist who works at Bay Area Video Coalition, a non-profit video and post-production facility.
- Annie Sprinkle: Sprinkle is a bisexual, trans-friendly, self-proclaimed "sex artist." Her involvement in the film revolves around a film she made with a former partner, Les Nichols, titled Linda/Les and Annie, which was a documentary film showcasing her sexual relationship with her intersex partner Les.
- Max Wolf Valerio: Max is a trans man. Born Anita Valerio in Heidelberg, Germany in 1957, Max moved to San Francisco. Since his transition he has written poetry and memoirs about his transformation process. Max was also profiled in the film Female Misbehavior, an earlier work from Monika Treut.
- Jordy Jones: Jordy is a trans man. He is a gender variant artist. His work, a project on Brandon Teena, was featured at the Solomon R. Guggenheim Museum in New York City. He and Stryker often collaborate on work throughout the west coast. Jones lives and works together with Stafford in San Francisco.
- Stafford: Stafford is a trans man. He grew up in Gridley, CA. Wanting to escape the small town environment, Stafford joined the Army as a photographer. After a five-year stint as a military photographer Stafford ended up in San Francisco because he was appreciative of the open and welcoming environment the city provided. Between 1987 and 1992 Stafford was a fashion model, often drawing androgynous roles. He lives and works with Jordi Jones and is a former lover of Tornado.
- Tornado: Tornado is a bisexual woman. She posed for Penthouse in 1980, which allowed her to leave her life in Minnesota for New York. She transplanted to San Francisco where she was very active in the nightclub scene. She then took a vow of silence and removed herself from public activity. She acts as a surrogate mother to Texas. She is also a former lover of Stafford.
- Hida Viloria: Hida is an intersex writer and activist. Growing up she felt more female than male, describing her situation as being not quite female. Feeling both masculine and feminine, Hida had trouble feeling that she fit into the lesbian community, with its pressure to be one or the other, "butch" or "femme". Throughout her life her feelings concerning her gender have shifted from feeling more female to feeling more male to acknowledging that she has elements of both and fluctuates between them. In the film she declares herself to be in the middle ground between the two gender poles, an identity which today would be called genderqueer, but was not yet popularly accepted or understood at the time.

== Festival ==
Gendernauts was shown at the following film festivals: Barcelona, Berlin, Bologna, Brisbane, Copenhagen, Helsinki, Lisbon, London, Los Angeles, Madrid, Montreal, Munich, New York, Paris, São Paulo, San Francisco, The Hamptons, Turin, and Vancouver.

== Awards ==
Gendernauts has been internationally recognized with the following awards:

- 1999 Audience Award at the São Paulo International Film Festival
- 1999 Best Documentary Film at the Torino International Gay and Lesbian Film Festival
