= Virgin Machine =

1988 drama film directed by Monica Treut

- Directed by: Monika Treut
- Screenplay by: Monika Treut
- Produced by: Monika Treut
- Starring: Ina Blum; Shelly Mars; Dominique Gaspar; Susie Bright
- Cinematography: Elfi Mikesch
- Edited by: Renate Merck
- Production companies: Hyena Films; NDR
- Release date: 10 February 1989
- Country: West Germany
- Languages: German; English

Virgin Machine (German: Die Jungfrauenmaschine) is a 1988 drama film, directed by Monica Treut. It is a co-production of Hyena Films with NDR.

== Plot synopsis ==
Dorothee Müller is a young journalist from Hamburg. She is eager for love, but frustrated by her relationships with men such as Heinz and Bruno, and sets out to unlock the secret to romantic love professionally, as a journalist, interviewing people from different professions. Failing to find the answers she seeks, she flies off to San Francisco. There, she meets several extraordinary women, and continues her quest to figure out love by interviewing them: Ramona, the drag king; Dominique, a Hungarian bohemian type; and Susie Sexpert, who owns a collection of incredible dildos. Dorothee's exploration leads her on a journey of self-exploration and adventure, and to new discoveries about her own sexuality.

== Cast ==
- Ina Blum – Dorothee Mueller
- Gad Klein – Heinz
- Marcelo Uriona – Bruno
- Shelly Mars – Ramona
- Dominique Gaspar – Dominique
- Susie Bright – Susie Sexpert
- Mona Mur – Singer

== Style ==
The film is shot in black and white, with punk styling and feminist aesthetic. The episodic presentation style chosen by Treut and the anarchistic spirit of the film have brought on comparisons to classics ranging from Jean-Luc Godard's Breathless to Lina Wertmueller to Susan Seidelman.

== Release ==
The film was originally released in 1988, when it screened in international festivals and was nominated for a Teddy Award. The film became something of a feminist underground classic, and has now been digitally remastered, and has been screened anew in such international venues as the 2017 Berlinale and 2019 TLVfest.

== Reception ==
In her review for The New York Times, Caryn James writes that Virgin Machine is "a blunt tribute to the not-revolutionary idea that lesbians can be lusty romantic fools just like anybody else." She gives mixed reviews to the style and content, concluding that the film is "more artsy than artistic, but at least Miss Treut is aiming for something stylish." In the Uncut film review of the 2017 Berlinale screening, the film is described as surprisingly sugary in light of its name and punk stylings. The review commends the renewed access to the film for a new generation of feminists, and says that Treut's treatment of sexuality in Virgin Machine is "open, cheerful and with a lot of fun; the women in the film go through life and are not only an inspiration for Dorothee Müller, but for all modern women."

== Awards ==
- 1988: Torino Giovani Film Festival, Best Film
- 1988: Torino Giovani Film Festival, Best Actress
- 1988: Berlinale, Teddy Award (nomination)

== Festivals ==
- Toronto International Film Festival
- Berlinale 1988, 2017
- London Gay & Lesbian Film Festival, 1998
- Créteil International Women's Film Festival
- Chéries-Chéris (Festival of Gays and Lesbians of Paris)
- Turin Film Festival
- Gothenburg Film Festival
- SQIFF
- TLVFest 2019
- Dublin International Film Festival, 2020

== See also ==
- List of LGBT-related films directed by women
