= Dem Täter auf der Spur =

German television series

- Created by: Jürgen Roland
- Starring: Günther Neutze; Karl Lieffen
- Country of origin: Germany

Dem Täter auf der Spur is a German television series.

== See also ==
- Episodes Dem Täter auf der Spur
- List of German television series
