= Horror Vacui (film) =

- Theatrical release poster
- Directed by: Rosa von Praunheim
- Screenplay by: Cecil Brown; Marianne Enzensberger; Rosa von Praunheim
- Produced by: Rosa von Praunheim
- Starring: Lotti Huber; Ingrid van Bergen; Joaquín La Habana; Folkert Milster
- Cinematography: Elfi Mikesch
- Edited by: Mike Shephard; Rosa von Praunheim
- Music by: Marran Gosov
- Production company: Rosa Von Praunheim Filmproduktion
- Release date: 1984
- Running time: 85 minutes
- Country: West Germany

Horror Vacui (German: Horror Vacui - Die Angst vor der Leere) is a 1984 German avant-garde film directed by Rosa von Praunheim.

The film was shown at international film festivals and in 1985 at the Museum of Modern Art in New York City.

== Plot ==
Shot in a neo-expressionist style, the film is a satire on cults of any kind. The plot follows Frankie and Hannes, a young gay couple living in Berlin. One is studying art and the other medicine. Their happy life is disrupted when Frankie attends a lecture and quickly becomes involved in a sinister cult operating as a self-help group called "Optimal Optimism". 'Madame C', a former Nazi party member, is the leader of 'Optimal Optimism'. When the cult members find out that Frankie is gay, they rape him. Hannes has to find a way to save him.

== Awards ==
- 1985: Los Angeles Film Critics Association Award

== Reception ==
"If you have a soft spot for fantastic and ironic films, you won't feel any inner emptiness [horror vacui] with Praunheim's wealth of fantasy." (Cinema Film Journal)
