= Lotti Huber =

German actress (1912–1998)

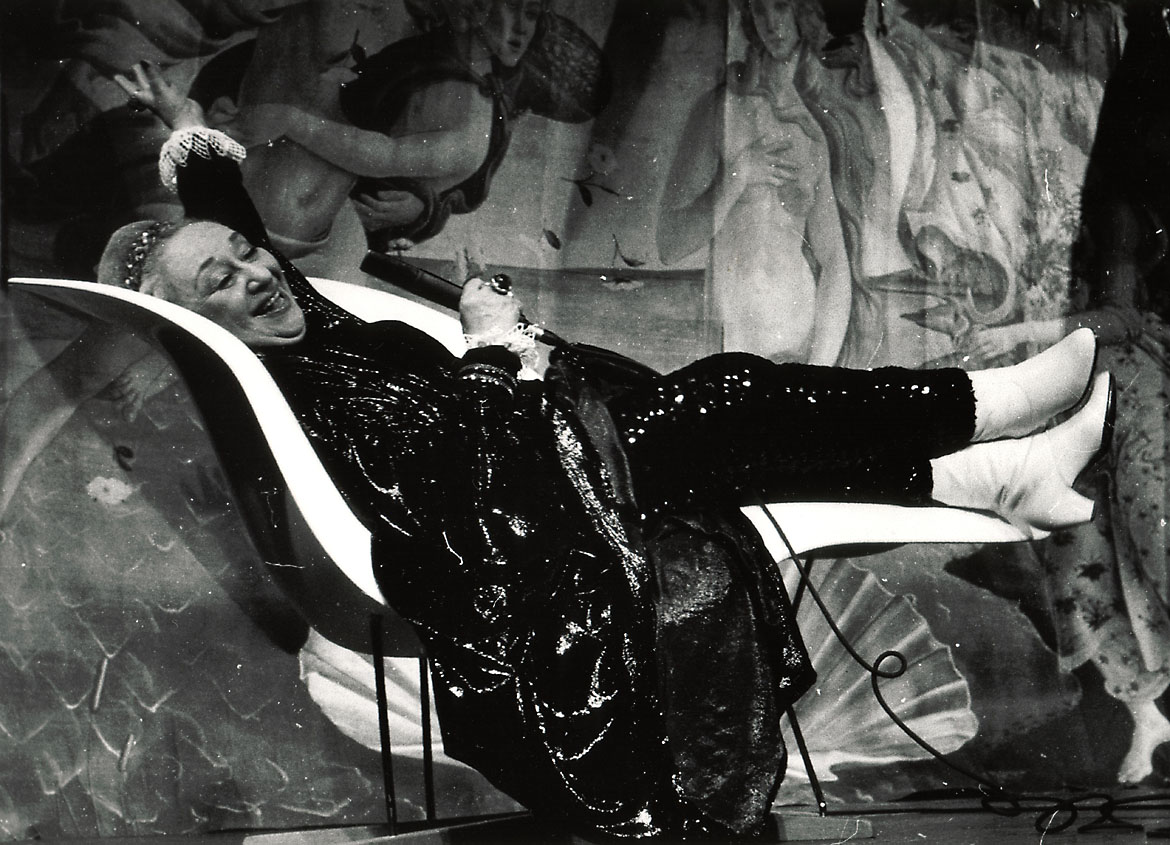
- Born: 16 October 1912; Kiel, Germany
- Died: 31 May 1998 (aged 85)
- Occupation: Actress
- Years active: 1978-1998

Lotti Huber (German: [ˈlɔ.ti ˈhuː.bɐ]; 16 October 1912 – 31 May 1998) was a German actress. She appeared in more than twenty films from 1978 to 1999. She became famous in Germany for her roles in Rosa von Praunheim's films.

== Selected filmography ==
Year	Title	Role	Notes
1984	Horror Vacui		
1988	Anita: Dances of Vice		
1990	Affengeil		
1995	Neurosia: 50 Years of Perversity		
