= Two Mothers (Faivre) =

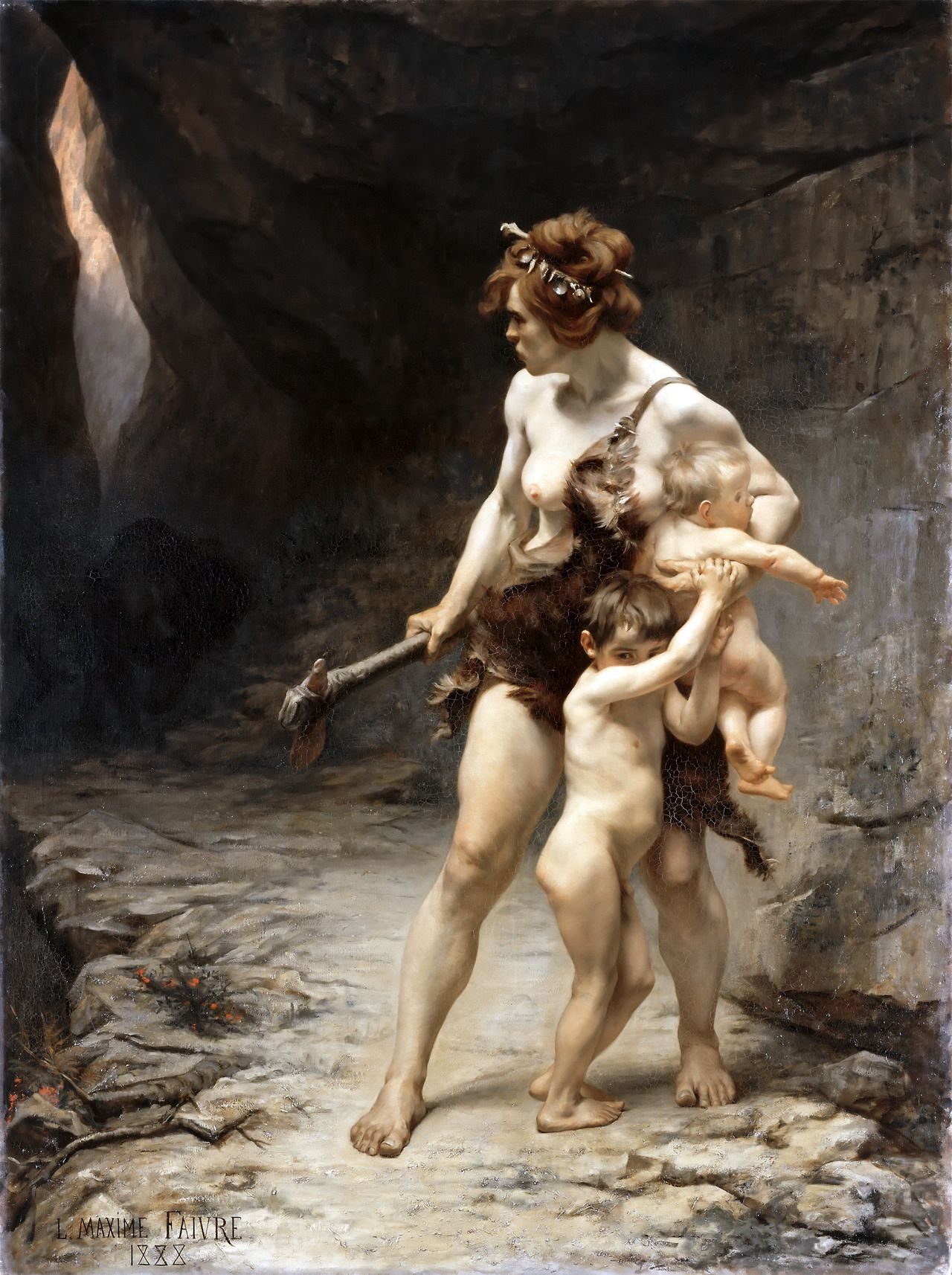
Léon-Maxime Faivre, 1888 - Deux mères

Two Mothers (French: Deux Mères) is an oil on canvas painting by Léon-Maxime Faivre. It was exhibited at the salon of 1888 and is currently in the Musée d'Orsay in Paris.

== Provenance ==
In 1888 the French state bought the work for 1,800 francs for the Musée des Antiquités nationales at Saint-Germain-en-Laye where it entered the collection in 1890. At some point before 1951 it was reallocated to the Louvre where it remained until 1982, when it was transferred to the Musée d'Orsay.

== Themes ==
The painting depicts a human mother from the Stone Age, inside a cave, protecting her two children as a mother bear approaches, with young of her own to feed and protect. The painting was Faivre's second work set in the Stone Age, following The Invader in 1884. Genre paintings set in prehistory were very popular at this time, and there was probably also an element of Third Republic patriotic fervor to it as the republic had placed the family at the centre of its institutions.

== Critical review ==
The Atheneum described the work as “a first-rate illustration….the flesh and drawing of the woman and children are distinguished by a coarse sort of vigour which is suited to the subject”. L'Artiste however criticised the work for its lack of originality, noting the resemblance of Faivre's subject to Eugène Delacroix’s Medée.
