= Monika Treut =

German lesbian filmmaker (born 1954)

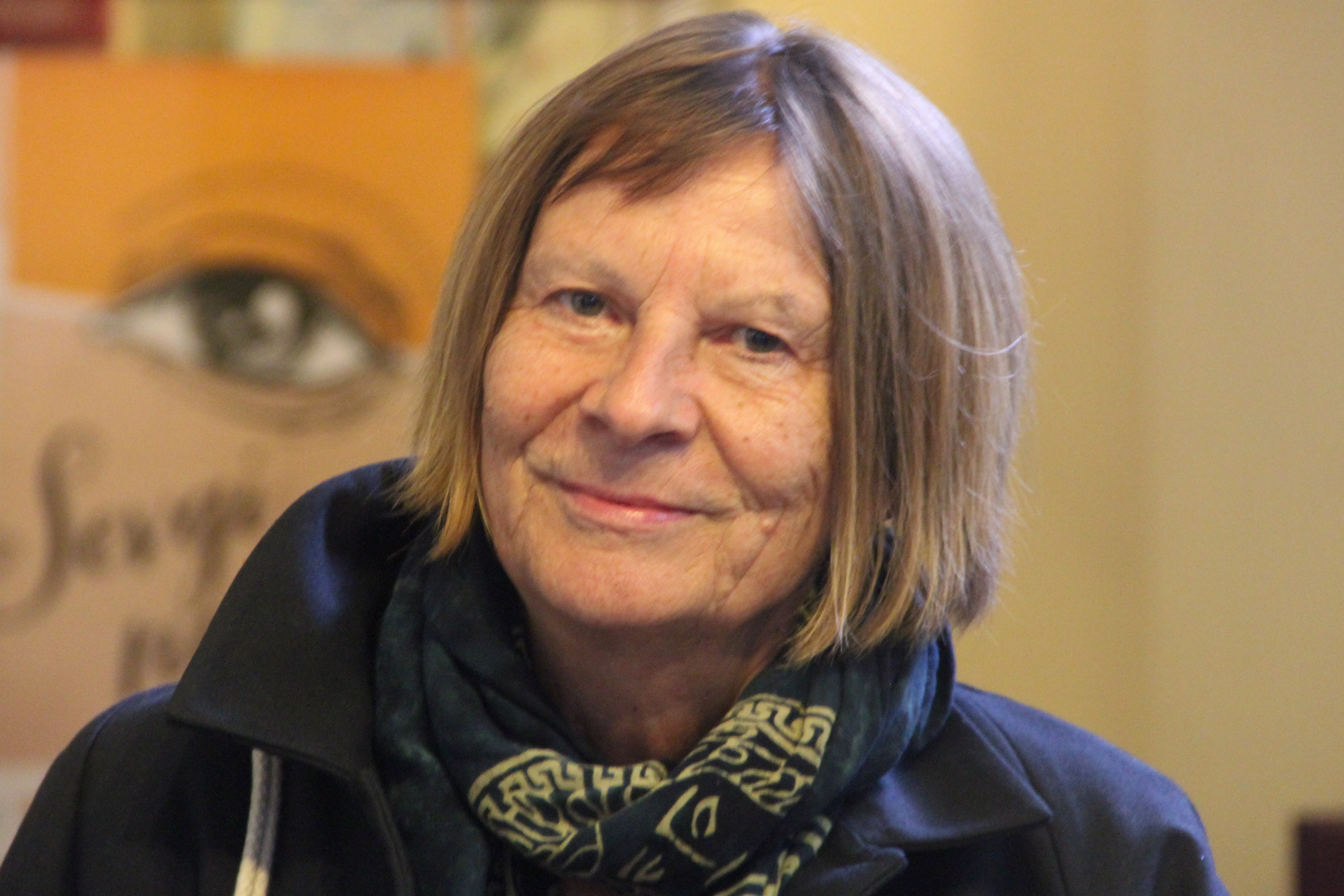
- Monika Treut in 2016
- Born: April 6, 1954 (age 72); Mönchengladbach, North Rhine-Westphalia, Germany
- Occupation: Filmmaker
- Known for: Queer films, documentaries
- Notable work: Seduction: The Cruel Woman; Annie; My Father is Coming; Encounter with Werner Schroeter

Monika Treut (born April 6, 1954, in Mönchengladbach, North Rhine-Westphalia, Germany) is a German filmmaker. She made her feature film debut with Seduction: The Cruel Woman (co-directed by Elfi Mikesch), a film that explores sadomasochistic sex practices. She has made over 20 films, including the short documentaries Annie and My Father is Coming. Treut’s film work includes writing, directing, editing, and acting.

== Education ==
Treut attended at an all-girls state high school. She studied literature and political science at Marburg University. After passing the state examination she graduated in 1978. In 1984, Treut earned her doctorate degree in philology from Marburg University. She wrote her PhD thesis about The Cruel Woman: Female Images in the Writing of Marquis de Sade and Leopold von Sacher-Masoch.

== Career ==
Known for her queer films, Treut also makes documentaries. Her subject matter varies from film to film, from one woman's efforts to help street children in Rio de Janeiro to about the culinary arts of Taiwan.

Throughout her career Treut has been involved in several aspects of filmmaking, including acting, directing, producing, writing, and editing. Her film catalogue includes over 20 films, both in her native language German and in English.

=== Early film career ===
During her studies at university in the mid-1970s she began working with video. She worked as a media associate in Marburg, Frankfurt, and Berlin. In 1984 she founded Hyena Filmproduktion together with Elfi Mikesch, and began producing, writing, and directing independent feature films. The following year Treut made her feature film debut with Seduction: The Cruel Woman, a film that explored sadomasochistic sex practices. Treut also spent time in America during the 1980s. Traveling and working in San Francisco and New York City, Treut met and worked with Annie Sprinkle and Werner Schroeter. These relationships led to the films Annie, My Father is Coming, and Encounter with Werner Schroeter.

=== Later film work ===
Of Girls and Horses (2014) focuses on the relationship that develops between 16-year-old high school dropout Alex and upper-class Kathy at a horse farm. Alex works at a horse farm for a school internship, supervised by lesbian riding instructor Nina. In an interview for AfterEllen conducted by Marcie Bianco, Treut said she "wanted to picture this situation [of a queer teenager's insecurity] and find a way of coming out of it."

Zona Norte (2016) revisits Yvonne Bezerra de Mello, the human rights activist working with street children in Rio de Janeiro, 15 years after Treut's 2001 documentary Warrior of the Light. The film follows up on the lives and progress of the children from the previous documentary, who have now grown into young adults.

Her 2021 film, Genderation, is a documentary that revisits the subjects of Treut's previous film, Gendernauts: A Journey Through Shifting Identities, 20 years later. The film looks at how the city of San Francisco has changed from being a hub for the LGBTQ+ community to being take over by gentrification and the presidency of Donald Trump.

In The Raw and the Cooked, Treut travels around Taiwan, exploring its culinary traditions and their relationship to the island's culture. The film also seeks out people who are attempting to create sustainable food system projects. The film had its world premiere in the Culinary Film section of the 62nd Berlin International Film Festival in February 2012.

In the edited book New Modern Chinese Women and Gender Politics, Ya-chen Chen contributes a chapter about Treut’s film Ghosted. Chen praises Treut for her ability to "exceed not only the essentialist restriction of physiology but also the corporeality that ghosts lose after deaths.” Chen also praises Treut's portrayal of a variety of different religions in China and their beliefs regarding ghosts.

=== Humanitarian work ===
Treut has been involved with "PROJETO UERE", an organization to help the street children of Rio de Janeiro founded by Yvonne Bezzerra de Mello, the subject of Treut's film Warrior of Light.

=== Teaching ===
Since 1990, Treut has been teaching, lecturing, and curating retrospectives of her work at institutions across the United States including Vassar College, Hollins University, Dartmouth College, San Francisco Art Institute, Indiana University Bloomington, University of Illinois Chicago, University of California San Diego, and Cornell University.

== Works ==
- How Does the Camel Go Through the Needle's Eye? (Wie Geht das Kamel durchs Nadelöhr?, 1981)
- Unknown Gender (Das Dritte Geschlecht, 1983)
- Bondage (1983)
- Seduction: The Cruel Woman (Verführung: Die Grausame Frau, 1985)
- Virgin Machine (Die Jungfrauenmaschine, 1988)
- Annie (1989)
- My Father is Coming (1991)
- Dr. Paglia (1992)
- Max (1992)
- Female Misbehavior (1992)
- Erotique (Let's Talk About Sex, 1994)
- Didn't Do It For Love (1998)
- Gendernauts: A Journey Through Shifting Identities (1999)
- Warrior of Light (Kriegerin des Lichts, 2001)
- Encounter with Werner Schroeter (Begegnung mit Werner Schroeter, 2003)
- Tigerwomen Grow Wings (Den Tigerfrauen wachsen Flügel, 2004)
- Jumpcut: A Travel Diary (Axensprung: Ein Reisetagebuch, 2004)
- Tigerwomen Grow Wings (Den Tigerfrauen wachsen Flügel, 2005)
- Made in Taiwan (2005)
- Ghosted (2008)
- Lesbian Nation (2009)
- The Raw and the Cooked (Das Rohe und das Gekochte, 2012)
- Of Girls and Horses (Von Mädchen und Pferden, 2014)
- Zona Norte (2016)
- Genderation (2021)
- Cooking Up Democracy (2026)

== Awards ==
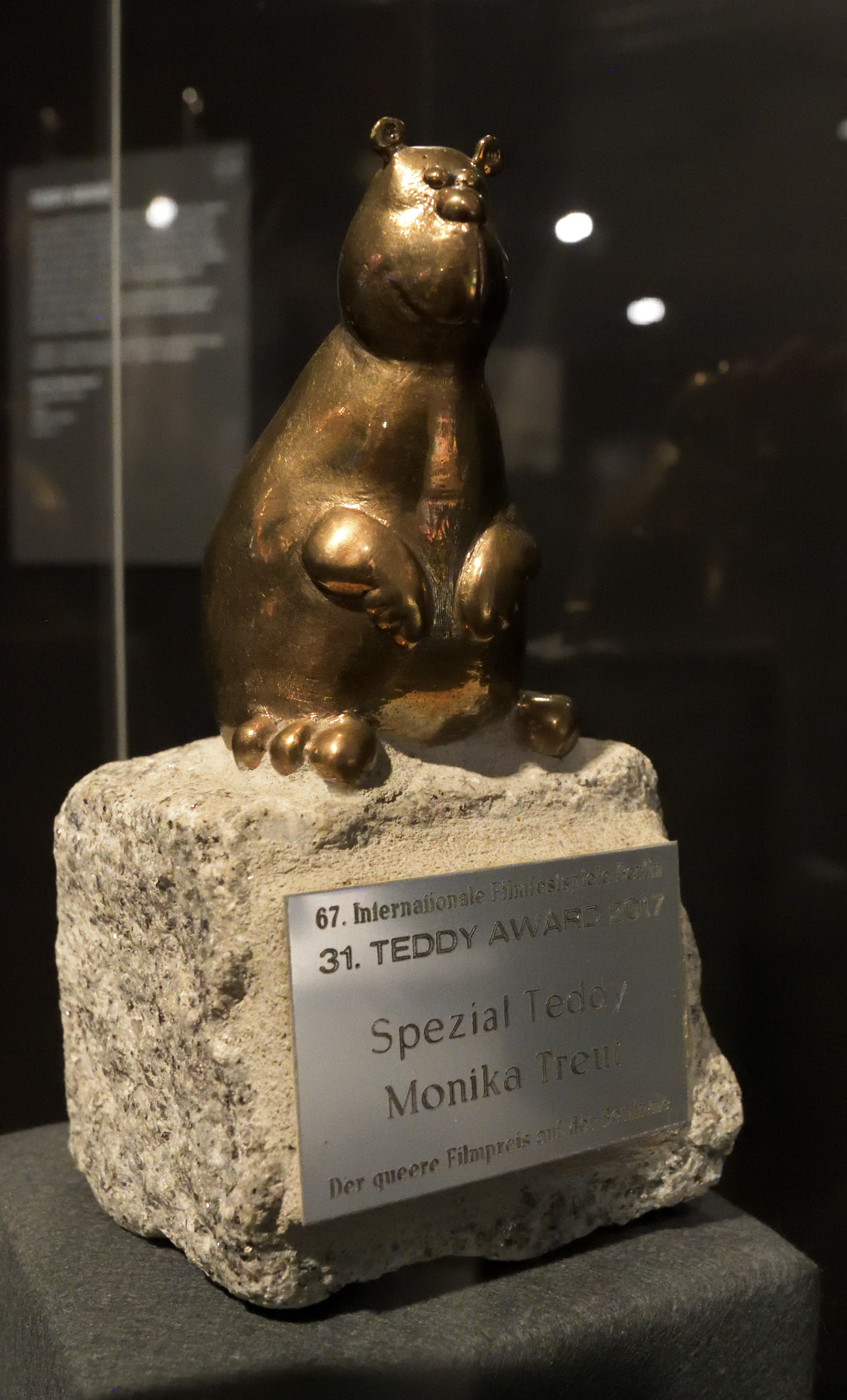
Teddy Award 2017 for her life's work.

Year	Work	Festival	Category	Ref.
1991	My Father Is Coming	Torino Gay & Lesbian Film Festival	Best Feature Film	
1999	Gendernauts	Torino Gay & Lesbian Film Festival	Best Documentary Film	
1999	Gendernauts	São Paulo International Film Festival	Audience Award	
1999	Gendernauts	Berlin International Film Festival	Jury Teddy Award for Best Documentary	
2002	Warrior of Light	Thessaloniki Documentary Festival	Audience Award	
2017		Berlin International Film Festival	Special Teddy Award for Lifetime Achievement	
2017		TLVFest	Honorary Award for Lifetime Achievement	
2024		Sicilia Queer filmfest	Nino Gennaro Award	

== See also ==
- List of female film and television directors
- List of lesbian filmmakers
- List of LGBTQ-related films directed by women
