= Maxime Faivre =

French painter (1856–1941)

Léon Eugène Maxime Faivre (5 January 1856 in Paris - 5 January 1941 in Paris) was a French painter .

== Biography ==
A student of Jean-Léon Gérôme, he exhibited regularly at the Salon des Artistes Français between 1877 and 1912, and continued to exhibit thereafter until 1932. A history painter, he often chose heroic, anecdotal and patriotic subjects. He was also quickly won over by the "prehistoric" trend that swept through the art world in the 1880s, alongside Fernand Cormon, Paul Jamin, and Emmanuel Benner. He illustrated the life of early humans several times, such as at the Salon of 1884 where he exhibited The Invader (l'Envahisseur) or at the Salon of 1888 where he presented Two Mothers (Deux mères).

Faivre also dealt with ancient history (Final Victory!, presented at the Salon of 1880), medieval history (The Death of William the Conqueror exhibited at the Salon of 1881), and modern history (The Death of the Princess de Lamballe a sensation at the Salon of 1908). He also produced a large number of portraits.

He died in Paris on 5 January 1941, on his 85th birthday.

== Works ==
- L'Intérieur de l'atelier de Monsieur Gérôme, 1877 Salon, location unknown
- Dernière Victoire!, 1880, Lisieux, musée d'Art et d'Histoire.
- Les femmes de la Révolution, 1904 Salon Lisieux, musée d'Art et d'Histoire.
- La Mort de Guillaume le Conquérant, 1881 Salon, location unknown
- L'Envahisseur, 1884, Vienne, musée des Beaux-Arts et d'Archéologie.
- Deux mères, 1888, musée d'Orsay.
- L'atelier du sculpteur Henri Allouard, 1905, Paris, Petit Palais.
- La Mort de la princesse de Lamballe, 1908, Vizille, musée de la Révolution française
- Mon bel œillet, 1909 Salon, location unknown

== Honours ==
Knight of the Legion of Honour - ribbon for ordinary uniform

Knight of the Legion of Honour
— 31 October 1912

== Selected works ==
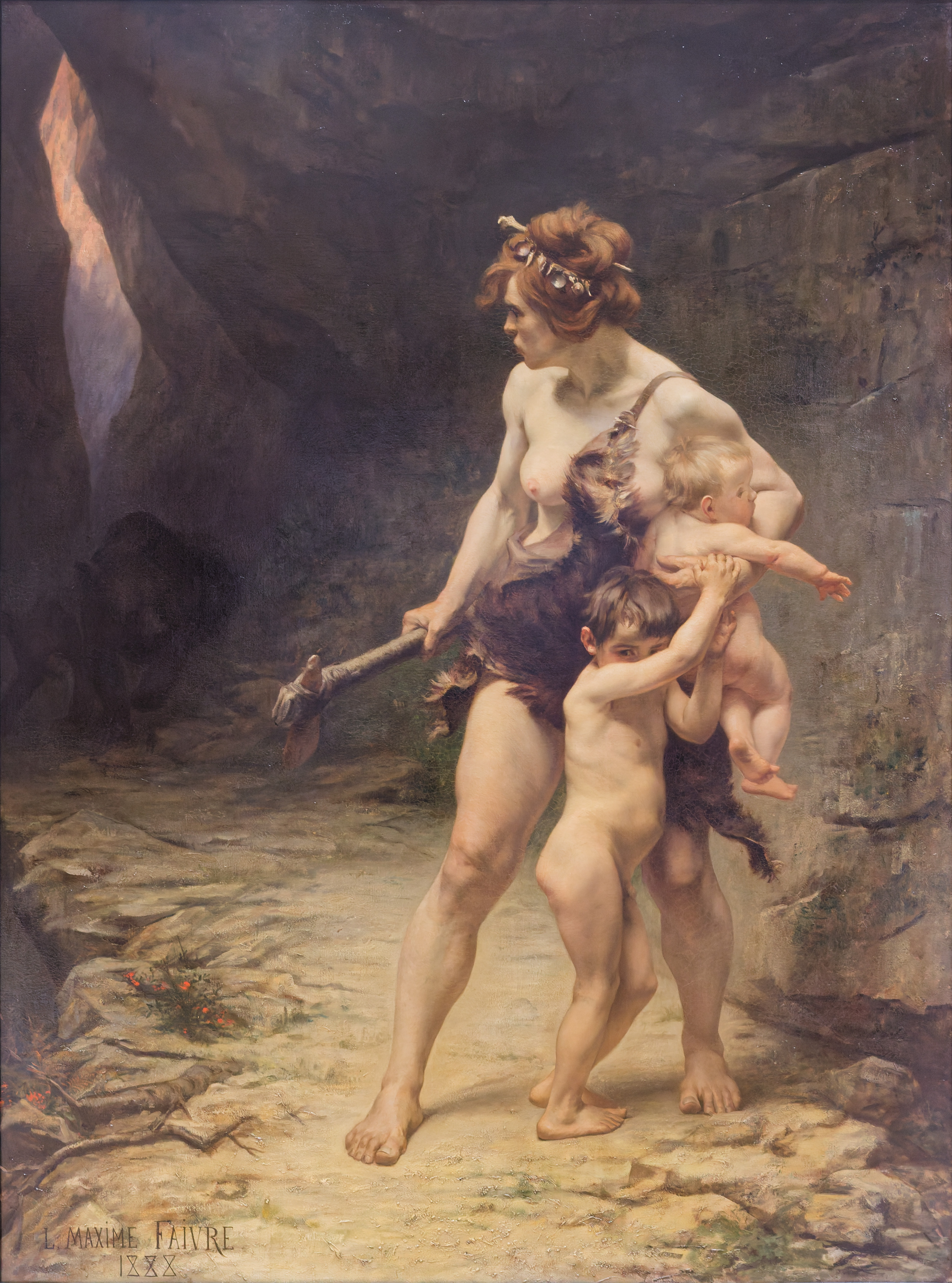
Two Mothers, 1888

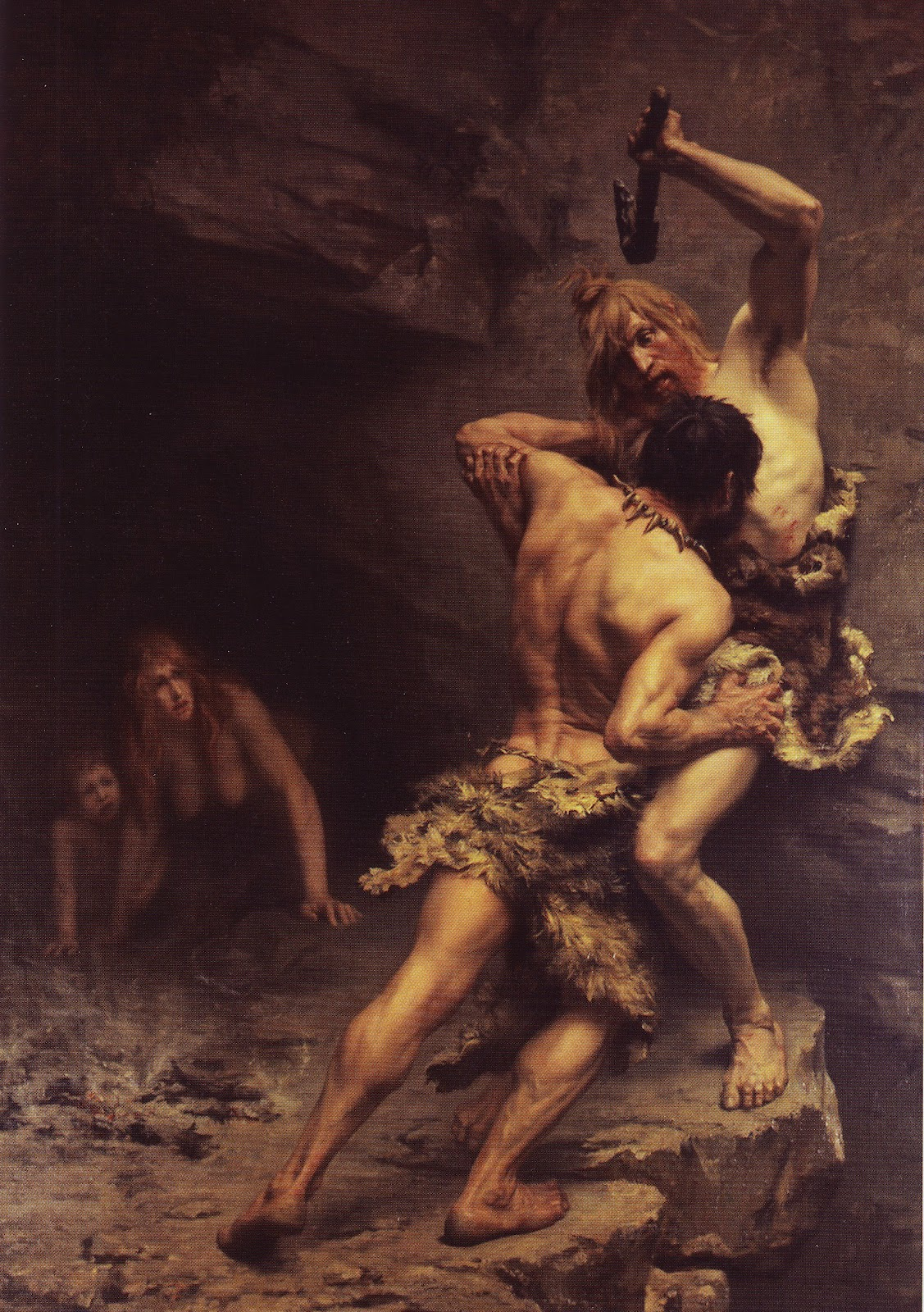
Invaders

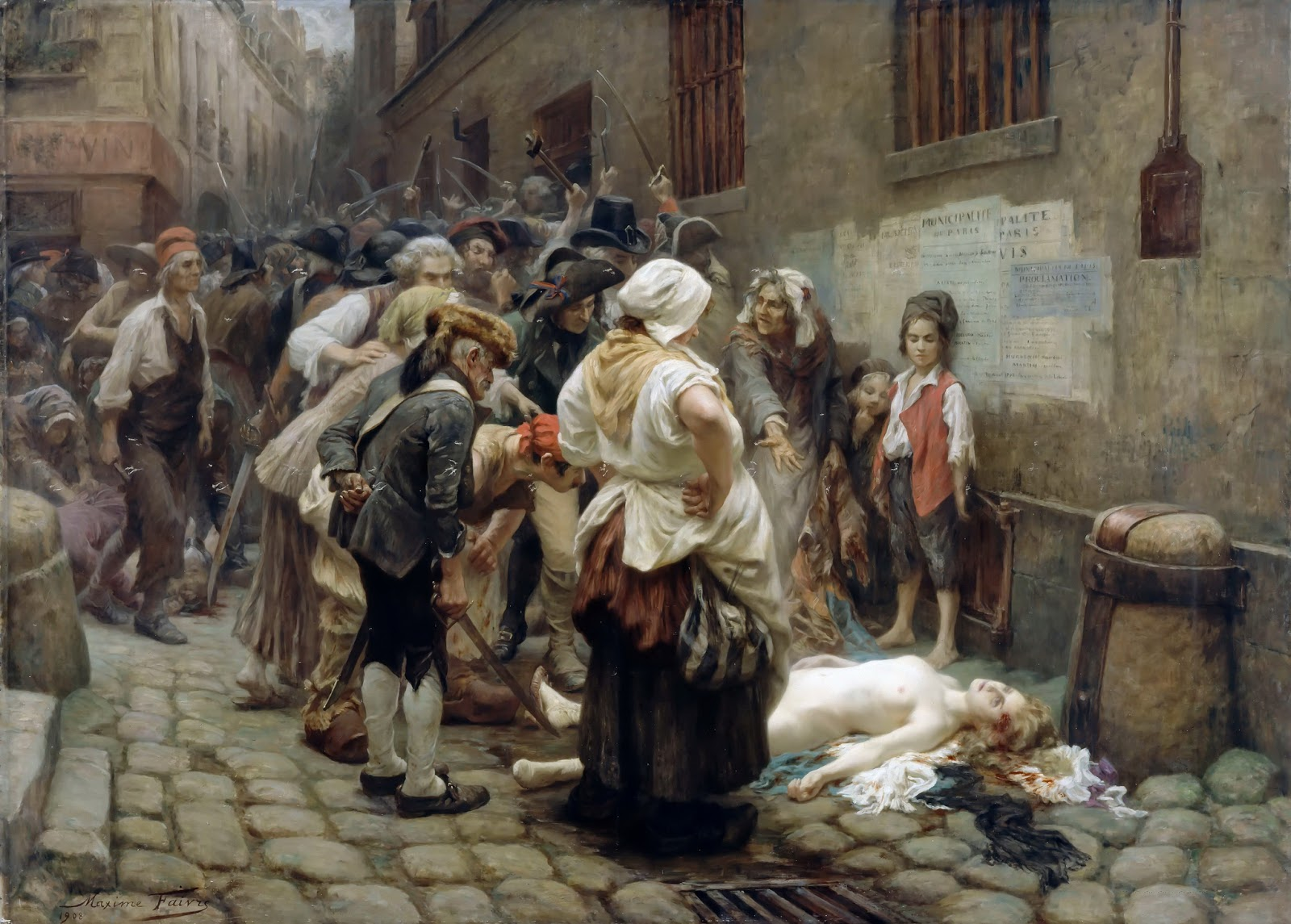
The death of the Princesse de Lamballe

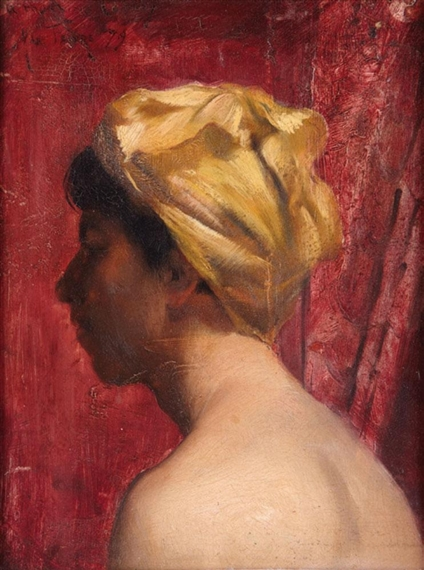
Coming out of the bath

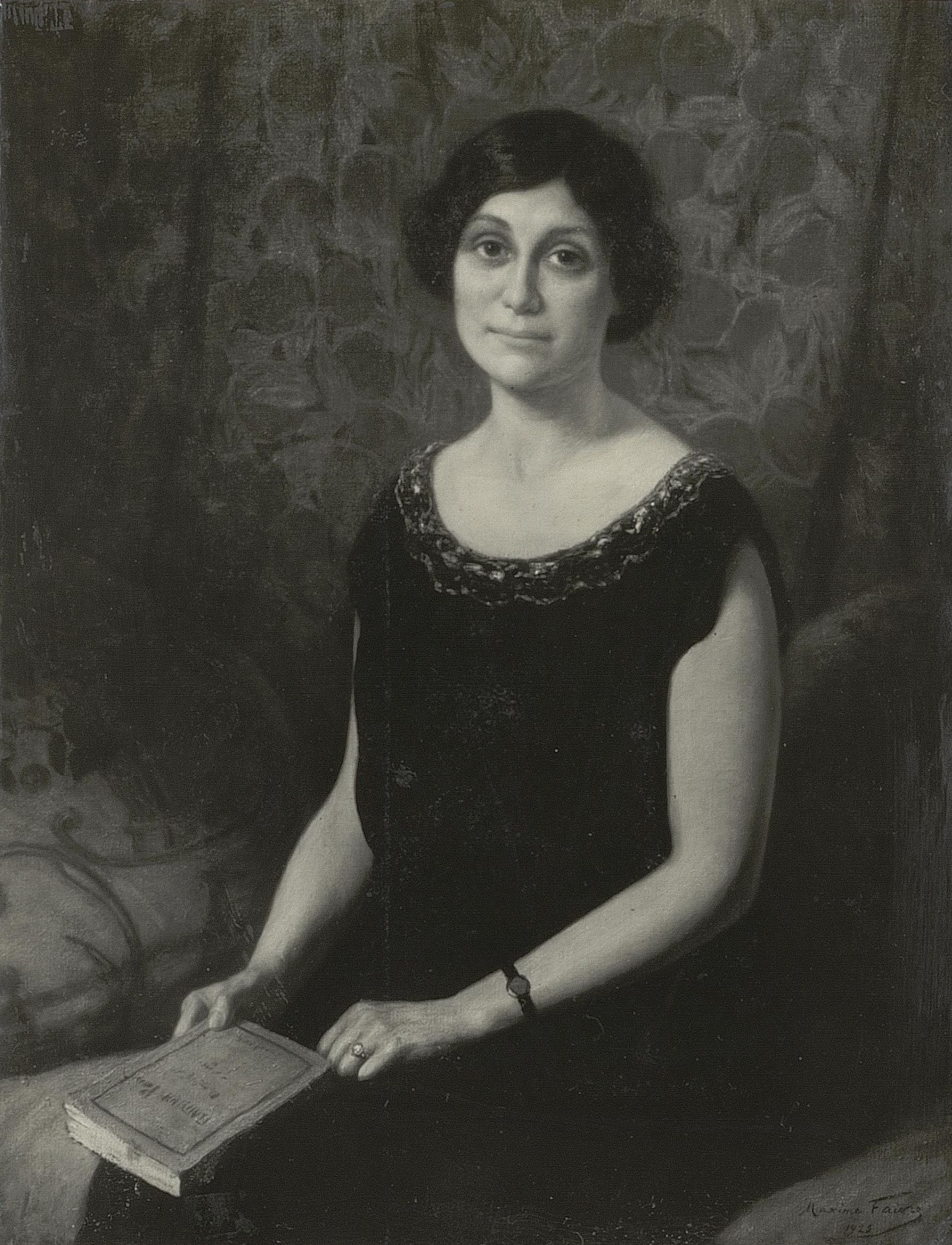
Marthe Pattez
