= Silence = Death (film) =

1990 American documentary film

- Directed by: Rosa von Praunheim
- Screenplay by: Rosa von Praunheim
- Produced by: Rosa von Praunheim; Michael Lupetin
- Starring: Allen Ginsberg; Keith Haring; David Wojnarowicz; Rafael Gamba; Peter Kunz; Don Moffett; Bern Boyle; Emilio Cubeiro
- Cinematography: Mike Kuchar
- Edited by: Rosa von Praunheim; Mike Shephard
- Production company: Rosa Von Praunheim Filmproduktion
- Distributed by: First Run Features
- Release date: May 4, 1990
- Running time: 60 minutes
- Countries: United States; West Germany
- Language: English

Silence = Death is a 1990 documentary film directed, written, and produced by Rosa von Praunheim (in cooperation with Phil Zwickler). The film received international resonance.

== Production Notes ==
The closing credits include "Assistant Director Steven Weiss".

== Plot ==
The film centers on the responses of gay artists in New York City to the AIDS crisis. Filmmaker Phil Zwickler conducts interviews of various individuals, such as graffiti artist Keith Haring; painter Rafael Gamba, who calls out homophobic bigotry; poet Allen Ginsberg, who offers his opinion on sexual attitudes; David Wojnarowicz, Paul Smith, Peter Kunz, Ed Koch, Don Moffett, Bern Boyle, and Emilio Cubeiro.

== Cast ==
- Allen Ginsberg
- Keith Haring
- David Wojnarowicz
- Rafael Gamba
- Peter Kunz
- Don Moffett
- Bern Boyle
- Emilio Cubeiro

== Reception ==
Film critic Janet Maslin observed that at the beginning of the film "a man tells the camera he has tested HIV positive for the AIDS virus; he talks briefly and angrily about his feelings, then suddenly lowers his pants and seems to shoot himself anally with a pistol at very close camera range." She goes on to note that this is only a simulated act of suicide, although "it is deadly all the same, insofar as it defines and limits von Praunheim's approach to reaching his audience."

Kevin Thomas wrote in the Los Angeles Times that the film makes a compelling case for all closeted gays "to come out and join the struggle to press for a cure for the disease and for more education in regard to its prevention, especially at a time when gay bashing is on the rise and when the far-right and various religious groups seem determined to view AIDS as a fit punishment for homosexuals."

Stuart Galbraith wrote in The Ann Arbor News that while there are several recognizable LGBTQ artists in the film, "much of the film's characters are made up of fringe-types, whose artwork is all well and good, but who tend to detract away from the subject of the film rather than complement it." In his review for the Los Angeles Daily News, Bob Strauss wrote that if you can get past the simulated suicide at the start of the film, then "nothing that comes after it should throw you, still, it sets the tone for a movie that has no intention of being polite."

Film critic Craig Seligman stated that the artists featured in the film "have a lot of anger to express, and wanting to sneak away from it may not make you a raving reactionary; it may have something to do with the failures of their art, or with the director's botched attempts to capture it."

== Awards ==
- 1990: Queer Film Prize of the Berlin International Film Festival.

== See also ==
- Silence=Death Project
- List of LGBTQ-related films
- List of LGBTQ rights activists
