= Anita: Dances of Vice =

1988 film

- Theatrical release poster
- Directed by: Rosa von Praunheim
- Screenplay by: Rosa von Praunheim; Lotti Huber; Marianne Enzensberger; Hannelene Limpach
- Produced by: Rosa von Praunheim
- Starring: Lotti Huber; Ina Blum; Mikael Honesseau
- Cinematography: Elfi Mikesch
- Edited by: Mike Shephard; Rosa von Praunheim
- Music by: Konrad Elfers; Rainer Rubbert; Alan Marks; Wilhelm Dieter Siebert; Ed Lieber
- Production companies: Road Movies; ZDF
- Release date: 1987
- Running time: 89 minutes
- Country: West Germany
- Language: German

Anita: Dances of Vice (German: Anita – Tänze des Lasters) is a 1987 German avant-garde film directed by Rosa von Praunheim.

The film premiered at the 1987 New York Film Festival and was also shown at, for example, the 1988 São Paulo International Film Festival.

== Plot ==
The film follows a delusional elderly woman who believes she is Anita Berber (1899–1928), a German dancer who, along with her partner Sebastian Droste, epitomizes the decadence of 1920s Berlin. Nude dance performances, cocaine use, and an excessive sex life characterize their lifestyle. Anita Berber's story is told through the thoughts and memories of the old lady (played by Lotti Huber) who is being held in an "insane asylum". Scenes from Anita's scandalous life are replayed also in her dreams.

== Production notes ==
The film is in two parts, with all the scenes in the psychiatric ward being shot in black and white and the scenes from Anita's past in color.

== Awards ==
- 1987: Nomination for the Gold Hugo at the Chicago International Film Festival
- 1987: Audience Award at the Torino Gay & Lesbian International Film Festival

== Reception ==
"This hit of the New York Film Festival is a study in decadence, madness, and kitsch." (Cleveland International Film Festival) Time Out magazine wrote: "[...] von Praunheim's film, visually astounding and performed with hilarious conviction, is an exhilarating testament to the power of the imagination."
