= Rosa von Praunheim =

German film director, academic and gay rights activist (1942–2025)

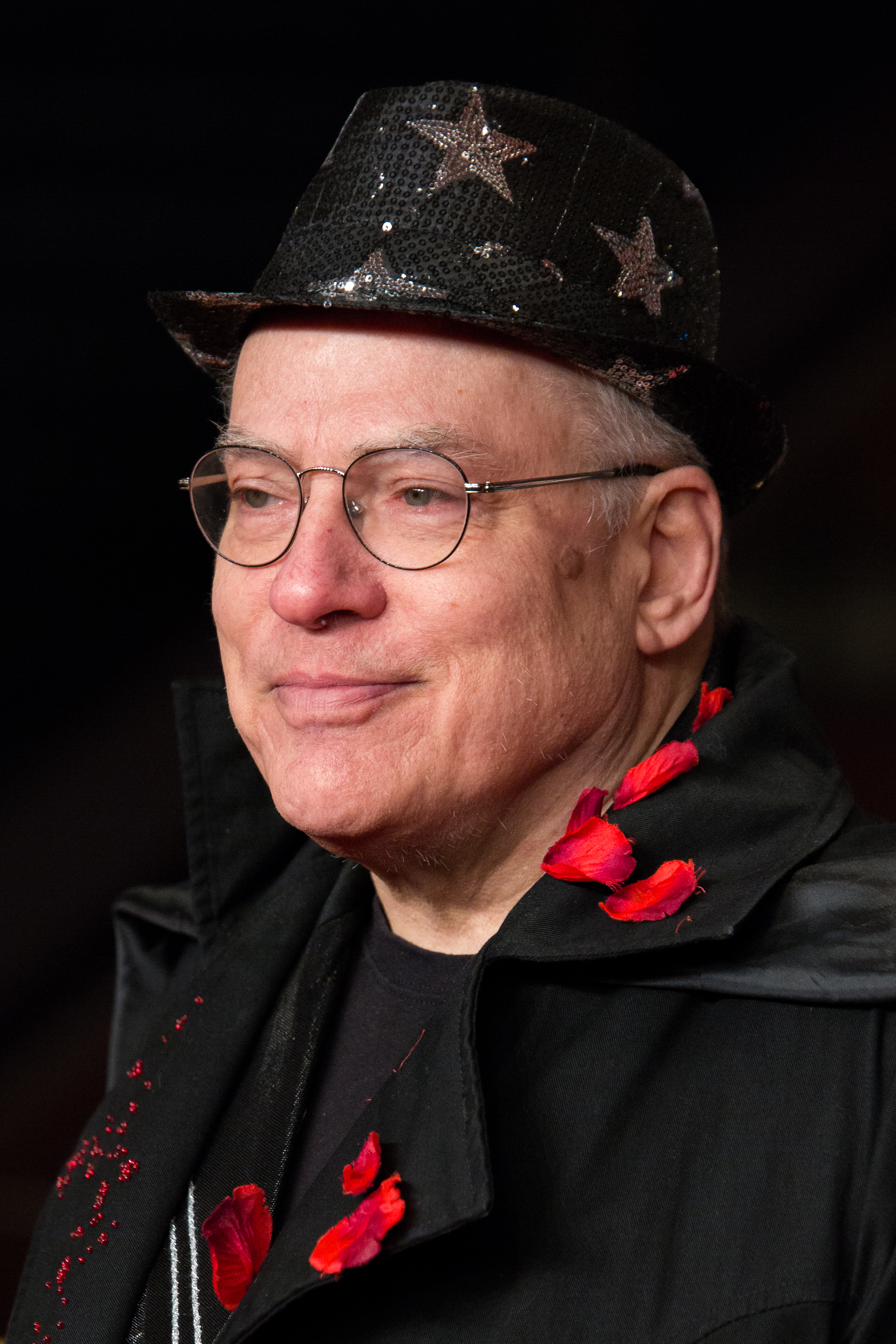
- Von Praunheim in 2018
- Born: Holger Radtke; 25 November 1942; Riga, Reichskommissariat Ostland (now Latvia)
- Died: 17 December 2025 (aged 83); Berlin, Germany
- Occupations: Filmmaker, author
- Years active: 1969–2025
- Website: rosavonpraunheim.de

Holger Bernhard Bruno Mischwitzky (born Holger Radtke; 25 November 1942 – 17 December 2025), known professionally as Rosa von Praunheim, was a German film director, author, producer, professor of directing and one of the most influential and famous queer activists in the German-speaking world. A pioneer of Queer Cinema and gay activist, von Praunheim was a key co-founder of the modern lesbian and gay movement in West Germany and Switzerland. He was an early advocate of AIDS awareness and safer sex. Furthermore, he was one of the most important representatives of the New German Cinema.

His films centre on queer-related themes and strong female characters, are characterized by excess and employ a campy style. They have featured such personalities as Keith Haring, Larry Kramer, Diamanda Galás, William S. Burroughs, Allen Ginsberg, Judith Malina, Jeff Stryker, Jayne County, Divine, Charlotte von Mahlsdorf, and a row of Warhol superstars. In over 50 years, von Praunheim made more than 150 films (short and feature-length films).

The Museum of Modern Art's website says of his film It Is Not the Homosexual Who Is Perverse, But the Society in Which He Lives: "Rosa von Praunheim's radical treatise on gay culture and politics exploded post-Stonewall activism in the early 1970s, and has internationally redefined queer liberation ever since."

== Early life ==
Von Praunheim was born as Holger Radtke in Riga Central Prison in German-occupied Latvia during World War II. His biological mother died in 1946 in the Wittenauer Heilstätten (a psychiatric hospital in Berlin). After his birth, he was given up for adoption. He only found out these facts when his adoptive mother, Gertrud Mischwitzky, told him in 2000. He discovered the fate of his biological mother in 2006 after a lengthy investigation. He documented his quest in his film Two Mothers (2007), which was shown at Tribeca Film Festival.

He received the name Holger Mischwitzky and spent his early years in East Berlin. In 1953, he left East Germany with his family to West Germany, first to the Rhineland, moving later to Frankfurt am Main. After Mischwitzky left secondary school (a Gymnasium in Frankfurt), he studied at Werkkunstschule in Offenbach. Later, he transferred to the Berlin University of the Arts, where he studied fine arts but did not graduate.

== Career ==
In the mid-1960s, he began his career associated with the New German Cinema. He adopted the female stage name Rosa von Praunheim to remember the pink triangle (Rosa Winkel) that homosexuals were forced to wear in Nazi concentration camps, as well as the Frankfurt neighbourhood of Praunheim where he grew up.

Von Praunheim made his debut with experimental and short movies, like Sisters of the Revolution (1969) and Samuel Beckett (1969), with which he quickly became famous. His film Macbeth - Opera by Rosa von Praunheim was shown at documenta V.

He married actress Carla Egerer (aka Carla Aulaulu) in 1969. The marriage ended two years later in divorce. During the same period, he collaborated with camerawoman Elfi Mikesch in a number of film projects. This artistic friendship and collaboration continued.

At the beginning of his career, von Praunheim also worked as an assistant director for Gregory J. Markopoulos, who dedicated his film (A)lter (A)ction (1968) to him. Rainer Werner Fassbinder staged the play Dedicated to Rosa von Praunheim (1969).

Von Praunheim's first feature film was produced in 1971: The Bed Sausage, a parody of bourgeois marriage. It became a cult movie, which had a sequel in 1975 (Berlin Bed Sausage): "Avant-garde cinema also has its masters, its greatest in Germany: Rosa von Praunheim. His film The Bed Sausage, which premiered on ZDF, confirmed once again what his works Pink Workers on Golden Street and Sisters of the Revolution, which have already been shown at many festivals, characterise: A mixture of artistic inventiveness, social awareness and humour that is exceedingly rare in Germany." (Frankfurter Allgemeine Zeitung).

In 1971, the director also caused a stir with his film It Is Not the Homosexual Who Is Perverse, But the Society in Which He Lives which led to many gay rights groups being founded and was the beginning of the modern lesbian and gay liberation movement in West Germany and Switzerland: "Rosa von Praunheim's film made an epoch." (Frankfurter Rundschau) The film also made Rosa von Praunheim the leading figure of the lesbian and gay movement in West Germany: "It is a personal liberation for Holger Mischwitzky [Rosa von Praunheim] - and a wake-up call for all homosexual men. [...] With this film, Rosa von Praunheim became the icon of the gay and lesbian movement in Germany almost overnight." (Deutsche Welle).

American film critic Joe Hoeffner wrote in an article about the twelve most important queer films: "Many films have been called revolutionary, but It Is Not the Homosexual... truly earns that description. The breakout film by director and activist Rosa von Praunheim (aka Holger Mischwitzky) became a foundational text of the German gay rights movement, and its call for liberation reverberated through the history of queer cinema." This movie found great resonance internationally. Some artists have referred to the film, for example Bruce LaBruce with the short film collection It Is Not the Pornographer That Is Perverse... (2018).

A prolific and controversial filmmaker, von Praunheim centred his directorial efforts on documentaries featuring gay-related themes. In the early 1970s, he lived for some time in the United States where he made a series of documentaries about the post-Stonewall American gay scene. In Army of Lovers or Revolt of the Perverts (1979) he took on the American gay and lesbian movement from the 1950s until the late 1970s. He was also interested in the underground theater in New York City, which was the focus of some of his films of this period including Underground and Emigrants (1976). In 1979, von Praunheim won a German Film Award for Tally Brown, New York, a documentary about American singer and actress Tally Brown, who died in 1989. In the USA von Praunheim worked with camera people like Jeff Preiss, Mike Kuchar and Juliana Wang.

Back in Berlin, he made feature films such as Our Corpses Are Still Alive (1981) and Red Love (1982). In 1983, von Praunheim's revolutionary film City of Lost Souls (1983) with Jayne County and Angie Stardust was released: "This riotous and massively ahead-of-its-time intersectional queer-punk musical has gone on to greatly influence transgender politics." (Australian Centre for the Moving Image) These films were shown at film festivals worldwide. His feature film Horror Vacui won the Los Angeles Film Critics Association Award for best experimental film in 1985. Anita: Dances of Vice (1987), the life story of a scandalous nude dancer in Berlin in the 1920s, attracted international attention. The film was shown, for example, at New York Film Festival and Chicago International Film Festival.

With the outbreak of the AIDS epidemic, von Praunheim worked on films about the HIV-related disease. A Virus Knows No Morals (1986) was one of the first feature films about AIDS internationally: "A Virus Respects No Morals, a savage, imaginative, scattershot Brecht-like allegory set largely in a gay bath, became one of the earliest and most provocative attacks on the hypocrisy, ignorance, politics and economics surrounding the AIDS crisis." (Los Angeles Times) The documentaries Positive and Silence = Death, both shot in 1989, deal with aspects of AIDS activism in New York City. Fire Under Your Ass (1990) focuses on AIDS in Berlin. For the so-called AIDS trilogy, von Praunheim was awarded the LGBTIQ-Film-Prize of the Berlin International Film Festival. The Guardian, one of Britain's most important newspapers, wrote in 1992: "Silence = Death and Positive: The best AIDS films to date [...]." The Los Angeles Times summed it up: "In short, Praunheim is just the man for the job he has taken on with Silence = Death and Positive: he has the breadth of vision, the compassion and the militance and, yes, the sense of humor necessary to tackle the AIDS epidemic in all its aspects." Critic Jerry Tallmer, co-founder of the Obie Awards, wrote in the newspaper The Record: "Rosa (originally Holger) von Praunheim, the brilliant, acerbic director of such breakthrough gay-revolutionist works as Silence & Death and A Virus Knows No Morals."

Von Praunheim was a co-founder of the German ACT UP movement and organized the first major AIDS benefit event in Germany. He was vocal in his efforts to educate people about the danger of AIDS and the necessity of practicing safer sex. On 10 December 1991, von Praunheim created a scandal in Germany when he outed the anchorman Alfred Biolek and the comedian Hape Kerkeling in the TV show Explosiv - Der heiße Stuhl as gay to call for public solidarity with the stigmatized gays from homosexual celebrities, of which there were hardly any in the German public at that time. Because of this, von Praunheim was considered a controversial figure in his home country for a long time, even within the queer community. But after the public outing action, several celebrities had their coming out. In addition, the German-speaking media began to report on homosexuality in more than just negative and problematic contexts. The outings initiated a positive reassessment of lesbians and gays.

In the early 1990s, von Praunheim developed the first queer TV format in Germany, but continued his film work at the same time. His film Life Is Like a Cucumber with Lotti Huber was shown at Toronto International Film Festival (1991). He was honored with two FIPRESCI Awards for his films I Am My Own Woman (1992) and Neurosia (1995).

Von Praunheim's film Transexual Menace (1996), named after the American transgender rights organization The Transexual Menace, was after City of Lost Souls again a very progressive film about transgender people and premiered at Frameline Film Festival in San Francisco and was also shown at Outfest in Los Angeles: "Von Praunheim's Transexual Menace dispenses with the usual cliches and brings us bang up to date with a profile of the new generation of politically active transsexuals [...]." (The Independent) The New York Times wrote: "Transexual Menace is a cornerstone of documentary filmmaking about transgender people."

Von Praunheim's The Einstein of Sex (1999) about Magnus Hirschfeld premiered at Locarno Festival and was nominated for the Golden Leopard. His film Can I be your Bratwurst, please? (1999) with Jeff Stryker and Vaginal Davis has been shown at over 250 film festivals around the world (a world record-breaking festival utilization). Moving Pictures Magazine chose the film as best title at Cannes Film Festival. In 2000, he was awarded the Robert-Geisendörfer-Preis for Wunderbares Wrodow, a documentary about the people in and around a German village and its castle. His film Cows knocked up by fog (2002) premiered at Venice Film Festival.

From 1999 to 2006, von Praunheim was professor of directing at the Film University of Babelsberg. Von Praunheim also taught at various film and art schools, including San Francisco Art Institute, where Abel Ferrara was one of his students. Former Praunheim students, filmmakers Tom Tykwer, Chris Kraus, Axel Ranisch, Robert Thalheim and Julia von Heinz, made the film Pink Children (2012) about their mentor.

In 2008, his film Two Mothers was shown at Tribeca Film Festival and was nominated for the Jury-Award. At 63rd Berlin International Film Festival, he was awarded the Berlinale Camera as one of the most important representatives of German cinema. Von Praunheim also received the Berlinale Special Teddy Award for his outstanding contributions to queer cinema. In 2012, he was awarded the Grimme-Preis for his documentary Rent Boys. In 2015, he received the Order of Merit of the Federal Republic of Germany. In 2020, he was awarded the Max Ophüls Honorary Award for his life's work. Von Praunheim also received the Honorary Award of Swiss Pink Apple Film Festival.

On the occasion of his 70th birthday (2012), von Praunheim made 70 short and medium-length films for German television station RBB under the title Rosa's World. Never before has a documentary filmmaker received so much airtime on German television. Rosa's World has also been shown at film festivals, for example at Vienna International Film Festival.

Von Praunheim wrote several books that have been successfully published by publishing houses such as Rowohlt Verlag.

Von Praunheim painted beginning in his early youth and occasionally exhibited in galleries and museums, for example at Migros Museum of Contemporary Art. He curated exhibitions himself, for example at Lincoln Center, and was director of the film and video arts department at Academy of Arts (2015 - 2018).

Rosa von Praunheim had many large and well-regarded film screenings and premieres in the US, for example at Museum of Modern Art in New York City (more than 15 times), at The Andy Warhol Museum in Pittsburgh, at Wheeler Hall of the University of California, Berkeley and at film festivals across the country. For example, he won the Creative Vision Award of Rhode Island International Film Festival. The American Cinematheque in Hollywood honored von Praunheim with a retrospective in 1997 as "a fearless international pioneer of gay cinema". In 1986, the first edition of the Gay Cinema Festival in Toronto held a Rosa von Praunheim retrospective to honor the director as "the dean of Berlin's underground filmmakers". In Canada, his films were also shown at Montreal World Film Festival, among other places. Several of the director's films premiered in Great Britain at Edinburgh International Film Festival and in Australia at Sydney Film Festival. The Tate Modern in London also showed Rosa von Praunheim's films. Mardi Gras Film Festival Sydney honored von Praunheim in a film series about the most important queer filmmakers.

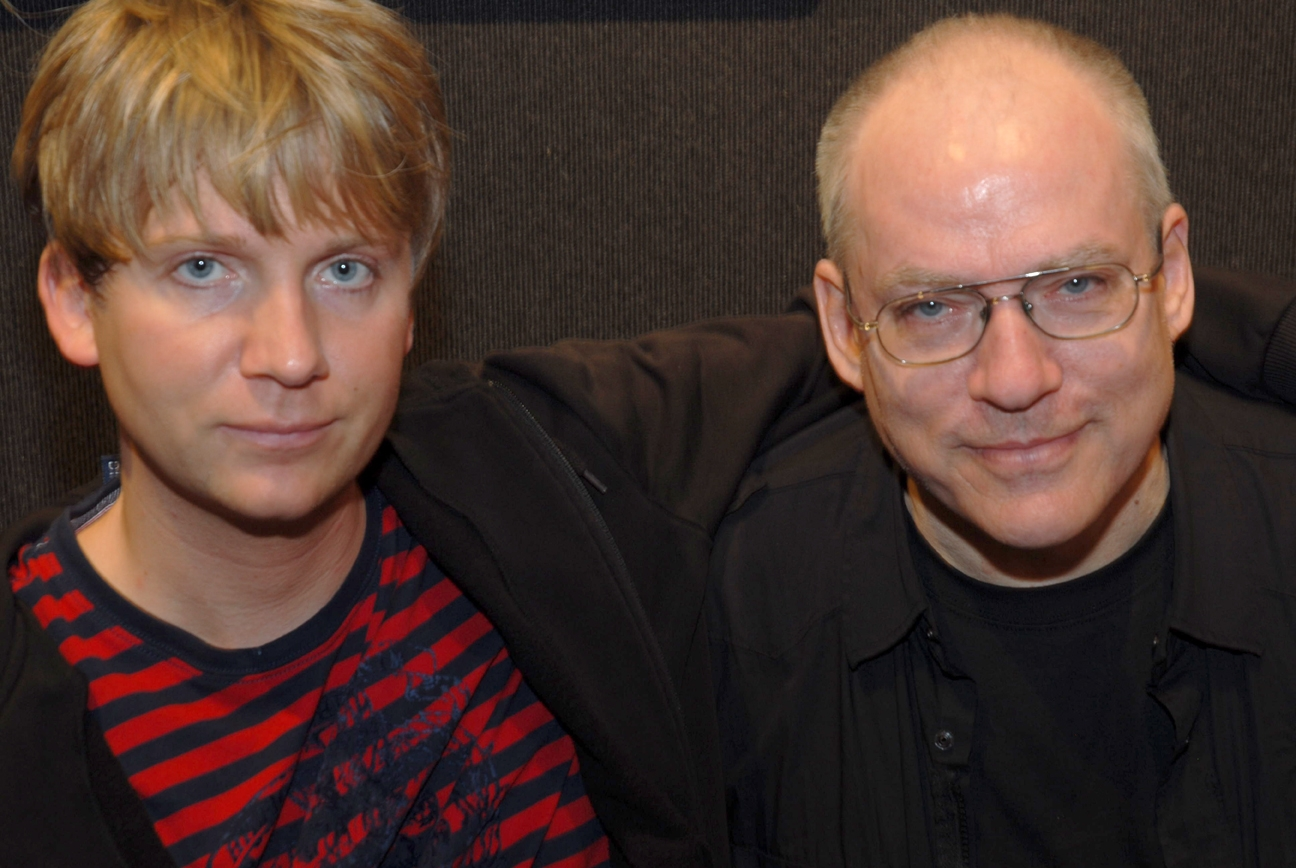
Rosa von Praunheim with his husband Oliver Sechting, 2008

Queer film festival Ciclo Rosa (Zyklos Rosa) in Bogotá was named in honor of Rosa von Praunheim. In South America, von Praunheim's films were shown at Buenos Aires International Festival of Independent Cinema and São Paulo International Film Festival, among other places. In Asia, for example, at Shanghai International Film Festival, Hong Kong International Film Festival, Taipei Film Festival and Tokyo International Lesbian & Gay Film Festival. Von Praunheim was represented at many A film festivals worldwide, often several times. He had more than 20 films at Berlin International Film Festival, making him record holder, and had numerous retrospectives in many countries.

His films are also evaluated in an academic context and shown at universities, for example at Beaux-Arts de Paris, The Courtauld Institute of Art London, University of Pennsylvania, Columbia University in New York City and Harvard University in Cambridge.

Von Praunheim's work has found its way into various academic papers and publications, including from Stanford University and Oxford University.

His film Survival in New York (1989) became von Praunheim's most commercially successful film in Germany, which was followed 20 years later by the sequel New York Memories (2009).

He was also a successful theater director, winning the Jury-Award at the Theater Authors Days (2018) at Deutsches Theater Berlin for his play Hitler's Goat and the King's Haemorrhoids.

The magazine The Advocate selected von Praunheim among the world's 50 most important queer people in the fields of activism, art and culture. On the occasion of von Praunheim's 75th birthday (2017), President of Germany Frank-Walter Steinmeier thanked him publicly for his artistic work and social commitment: "My congratulations go to an exceptional artist who, with his extensive cinematic oeuvre, has succeeded in intervening in social reality and changing it [...]."

== Personal life and death ==
Von Praunheim lived in Berlin with his husband Oliver Sechting, a German author, director and mental health activist. They married five days before Praunheim's death. Von Praunheim died in Berlin on 17 December 2025, at the age of 83.

== Books (selection) ==
- Männer, Rauschgift und der Tod. 1967
- Oh Muvie. 1968, Fotoroman mit Elfie Mikesch
- Sex und Karriere. Rowohlt TB-V., 1978, ISBN 3-499-14214-7
- Armee der Liebenden oder Aufstand der Perversen. 1979, ISBN 3-88167-046-7
- Gibt es Sex nach dem Tode. Prometh Verlag, 1981, ISBN 3-922009-30-1
- Rote "Liebe": ein Gespräch mit Helga Goetze. Prometh Verl., 1982, ISBN 3-922009-47-6
- 50 Jahre pervers. Die sentimentalen Memoiren des Rosa von Praunheim. Verlag Kiepenheuer & Witsch, 1993, ISBN 3-462-02476-0
- Folge dem Fieber und tanze: Briefwechsel mit Mario Wirz. Aufbau-Verlag, 1995
- Mein Armloch. Martin Schmitz Verlag, 2002, Gedichte
- Die Rache der alten dicken Tunte. 2006, Fotobuch
- Die Bettwurst und meine Tante Lucy. 2006, Fotobuch

== Selected filmography ==
- Sisters of the Revolution (1969)
- The Bed Sausage (1971)
- It Is Not the Homosexual Who Is Perverse, But the Society in Which He Lives (1971)
- Axel von Auersperg (1974)
- Berlin Bed Sausage (1975)
- Tally Brown, New York (1979)
- Army of Lovers or Revolt of the Perverts (1979)
- Unsere Leichen leben noch (1981)
- Red Love (1982)
- City of Lost Souls (1983)
- Horror Vacui (1984)
- A Virus Knows No Morals (1986)
- Anita: Dances of Vice (1987)
- Dolly, Lotte and Maria (1987)
- Survival in New York (1989)
- Positive (1990)
- Silence = Death (1990)
- Life Is Like a Cucumber (1990)
- I Am My Own Woman (1992)
- Neurosia: 50 Years of Perversity (1995)
- Transexual Menace (1996)
- The Einstein of Sex (1999)
- Can I Be Your Bratwurst, Please? (1999)
- Wunderbares Wrodow (1999)
- Fassbinder's Women (2000)
- Tunten lügen nicht (2001)
- Kühe vom Nebel geschwängert (2002)
- Pfui Rosa! (2002)
- Queens Don't Lie (2002)
- Men, Heroes and Gay Nazis (2005)
- Your Heart in My Head (2005)
- Two Mothers (2007)
- The Pink Giant (2008)
- History of Hell (2009)
- New York Memories (2010)
- Rent Boys (2011)
- King of Comics (2012)
- Rosa's World (2012)
- Praunheim Memoires (2014)
- How I Learned to Love the Numbers (as producer) (2014)
- Tough Love (2015)
- Welcome All Sexes - 30 Years Teddy Awards (2016)
- ACT! Who am I? (2017)
- Survival in Neukölln (2017)
- Friendship of Men (2018)
- Darkroom - Drops of Death (2019)
- Rex Gildo - The Last Dance (2022)
- Satanic Sow (2025)

== Sources ==
- Kuzniar, Alice. The Queer German Cinema, Stanford University Press, 2000, ISBN 0-8047-3995-1
- Murray, Raymond. Images in the Dark: An Encyclopedia of Gay and Lesbian Film and Video. TLA Publications, 1994, ISBN 1880707012
- Zielinski, Ger. Rebel with a Cause: An Interview with Rosa Von Praunheim. Cinéaste, vol. 37, no. 3, 2012.
