= A Virus Knows No Morals =

- Theatrical release poster
- Directed by: Rosa von Praunheim
- Screenplay by: Rosa von Praunheim
- Starring: Rosa von Praunheim; Dieter Dicken; Maria Hasenaecker
- Cinematography: Elfi Mikesch
- Edited by: Rosa von Praunheim; Michael Schaefer
- Music by: Marran Gosov and the Bermudas.
- Production company: Rosa von Praunheim Filmproduktion
- Release date: 16 January 1986
- Running time: 84 minutes
- Country: West Germany
- Language: German

A Virus Knows No Morals (German: Ein Virus kennt keine Moral) is a 1986 German film directed, written and produced by Rosa von Praunheim. It was one of the first feature films about AIDS worldwide.

The film also received much attention abroad and is still screened today. A Virus Knows No Morals premiered at the 1986 Berlin International Film Festival and was also shown, for example, at the International Film Festival Rotterdam in the same year.

== Plot ==
A group of contrasting characters share one thing in common: They all have to do with the subject of AIDS. There is Rüdiger, a conservative gay man who runs a sex sauna. Christian is a devout man who sacrificially cares for his partner who has AIDS. A curious blood doctor tries to find out the origin of HIV and shares the positive test results with her patients, not without gloating. A reporter, disguised as a man, tries to spy on the gay scene. Finally, the government decides to isolate the infected people on the island of Helgoland in order to contain the epidemic, but the outcasts put up a brave fight.

== Reception ==
"A Virus Respects No Morals, a Brechtian-like allegory set largely in a gay bath, was one of the early and more provocative attacks on the hypocrisy, ignorance, politics and economics surrounding the AIDS crisis." (Los Angeles Times) Critic Jerry Tallmer, founder of the Obie Award, wrote: "Rosa (originally Holger) von Praunheim, the brilliant, acerbic director of such breakthrough gay-revolutionist works as Silence = Death and A Virus Knows No Morals."
