= List of LGBTQ-related films of 1979 =

This is a list of lesbian, gay, bisexual, transgender or queer-related films released in 1979. It contains theatrically released films that deal with important gay, lesbian, bisexual, transgender or queer characters or issues and may have same-sex romance or relationships as a plot device.

== Films ==
| Title | Director | Country | Genre | Cast | Notes |
|---|---|---|---|---|---|
| Army of Lovers or Revolt of the Perverts | Rosa von Praunheim | West Germany | Documentary | | Follows the rise of gay activism in the United States between 1972 and 1978 in the aftermath of the Stonewall riots. |
| The Bell Jar | Larry Peerce | United States | Drama | Marilyn Hassett, Julie Harris, Jameson Parker | Based on the novel by Sylvia Plath |
| Caligula | Tinto Brass | Italy; United States | History, drama | Malcolm McDowell, Teresa Ann Savoy, Helen Mirren, Guido Mannari, John Gielgud, Peter O'Toole, Giancarlo Badessi, John Steiner, Paolo Bonacelli, Leopoldo Trieste, Adriana Asti, Mirella Dgelo, RicharParets, Donato Placido, Osiride Pevarello, Anneka Di Lorenzo, Lori Wagner, Bruno Brive and Paula Mitchell | |
| Confused Feelings | Etienne Périer | France; West Germany | TV film, drama | Michel Piccoli, Pierre Malet, Gila von Weitershausen, Heinz Weiss, Andreas von Studnitz, Richard Lauffen, Käte Jaenicke and Emily Reuer | Based on the novella Confusion by Stefan Zweig |
| The End of the Rainbow | Uwe Frießner | West Germany | Drama | Thomas Kufahl, Slavica Rankovic, Henry Lutze, Udo Samel, Heinz Hoenig, Sabine Beck-Baruth, Andrew Bergmann, Michael Brennicke, Aksunger Dogan, Klaus Jaschkowski and Johanna Karl-Lory | a.k.a. Das Ende des Regenbogens |
| Ernesto | Salvatore Samperi | Italy; Spain; West Germany | Drama | Virna Lisi, Concha Velasco, Michele Placido, Turi Ferro, Martin Halm, Lara Wendel, Enrique San Francisco, Enrique Vivó, Francisco Marsó and Renato Salvatori | Loosely based on the novel of the same name by Umberto Saba |
| Il était une fois un homosexuel | Norbert Terry | France | Adult | Piotr Stanislas, Philippe Veschi, Liliane Jeney, François Dantchev and Gilles Dellac | Aka "A Gay Swede in Paris" |
| Hot Potato | Steno | Italy | Comedy | Renato Pozzetto, Massimo Ranieri, Edwige Fenech, Mario Scarpetta, Clara Colosimo, Luca Sportelli, Sergio Ciulli, Adriana Russo, Umberto Raho and Ennio Antonelli | a.k.a. La patata bollente |
| A Intrusa | Carlos Hugo Christensen | Brazil | Drama | José de Abreu, Arlindo Barreto, Maria Zilda Bethlem, Palmira Barbosa, Fernando de Almeida, Ricardo Marnick, Mauricio Loyola, Heloísa Gadel, Nelson Pinto Bastos and Hermes Lago | Based on the short story of the same name by Jorge Luis Borges |
| Manhattan | Woody Allen | United States | Comedy, drama | Woody Allen, Diane Keaton, Michael Murphy, Mariel Hemingway, Meryl Streep, Anne Byrne, Michael O'Donoghue, Wallace Shawn, Karen Ludwig, Charles Levin, Karen Allen, David Rasche, Mark Linn-Baker and Frances Conroy | |
| A Perfect Couple | Robert Altman | United States | Romantic Comedy | Paul Dooley, Marta Heflin, Titos Vandis | |
| Race d'Ep | Lionel Soukaz | France | Drama, History | Elizar Van Effenterre, Gilles Sandier, Pierre S., Pierre Hahn, Jean Demelier, Yves Jacquemard, Jean-Michel Sénécal, Claire Amiard, Betty, Adeline André, Michel Journiac, Jean-Luc, Piotr Stanislas, Dominique and Hunks Clements | "Race d'Ep" is Paris street slang for homosexual |
| República dos Assassinos | Miguel Faria Jr. | Brazil | Drama | Tarcísio Meira, Sandra Bréa, Anselmo Vasconcelos, Silvia Bandeira, José Lewgoy, Tonico Pereira, Ítalo Rossi, Flávio São Thiago, Paulo Villaça, Milton Moraes, Vinícius Salvatori, Ivan de Almeida, José Dumont, Lia Soul and Elba Ramalho | |
| The Rose | Mark Rydell | United States | Drama | Bette Midler, Alan Bates, Frederic Forrest | |
| Saint Jack | Peter Bogdanovich | United States | Drama | Ben Gazzara, Denholm Elliott | Based on the novel by Paul Theroux |
| Tally Brown, New York | Rosa von Praunheim | United States; West Germany | Documentary | Tally Brown, Holly Woodlawn | |
| The Tempest | Derek Jarman | United Kingdom | Drama | Heathcote Williams, Toyah Willcox | Based on the play by William Shakespeare |
| Ticket of No Return (Bildnis einer Trinkerin) | Ulrike Ottinger | West Germany | Drama | Tabea Blumenschein | |
| To Forget Venice | Franco Brusati | Italy | Drama | Mariangela Melato, Eleonora Giorgi, Erland Josephson, Nerina Montagnani, David Pontremoli, Fred Personne and Armando Brancia | a.k.a. Dimenticare Venezia |
| Twee vrouwen | George Sluizer | Netherlands | Drama, romance | Bibi Andersson, Anthony Perkins, Sandrine Dumas, Kitty Courbois, Tilly Perin-Bouwmeester, Astrid Weyman, Sarah Godbold, Charles Gormley, Arnold Gelderman, Adrian Brine, Gregor Frenkel Frank, Joop Admiraal, Tim Beekman, Walter van Canoy and Bernard-Pierre Donnadieu | |
| We Were One Man | Philippe Vallois | France | Drama | Serge Avédikian, Piotr Stanislas, Catherine Albin and Lucien Guérin | a.k.a. Nous étions un seul homme |
