= Orlando: A Biography =

1928 novel by Virginia Woolf

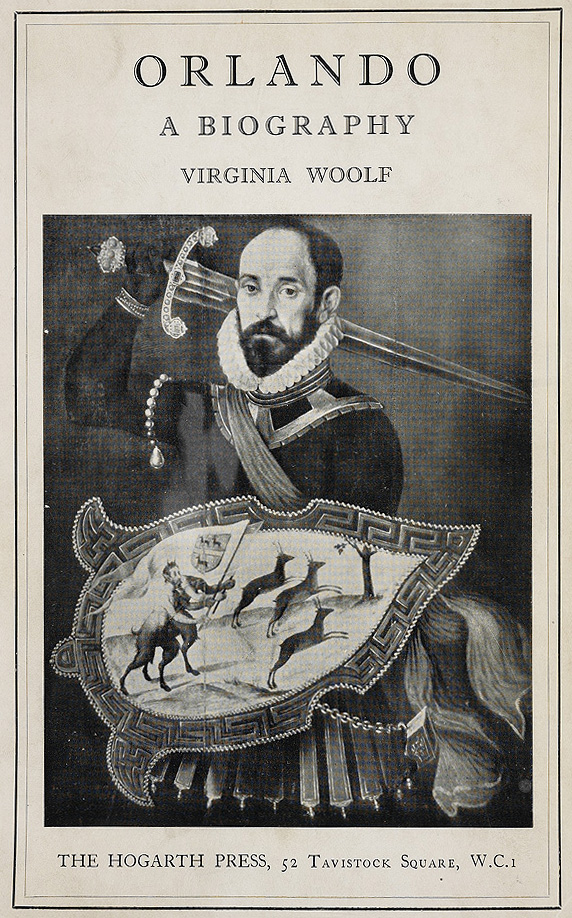
- Cover of the 1928 edition
- Author: Virginia Woolf
- Language: English
- Publisher: Hogarth Press
- Publication date: 11 October 1928
- Publication place: United Kingdom
- Media type: Hardback
- Pages: 299
- OCLC: 297407
- Text: Orlando: A Biography at Wikisource

Orlando: A Biography is a novel by Virginia Woolf, first published on 11 October 1928, inspired by the tumultuous family history of the aristocratic poet and novelist Vita Sackville-West, Woolf's lover and close friend. It is a history of English literature in satiric form. The book describes the adventures of a poet who changes from man to woman and lives for centuries, meeting the key figures of English literary history. Considered a feminist classic, the book has been written about extensively by scholars of women's writing and gender and transgender studies.

The novel has been adapted a number of times. In 1981, Ulrike Ottinger adapted it for her film Freak Orlando, with Magdalena Montezuma in the title role. In 1989, director Robert Wilson and writer Darryl Pinckney collaborated on a single-actor theatrical production. This had its British premiere at the Edinburgh Festival in 1996, with Miranda Richardson playing the title role; Isabelle Huppert performed in the version in French, which opened at the Théâtre Vidy-Lausanne in Lausanne (Switzerland) in 1993. A film adaptation by Sally Potter, simply titled Orlando, was released in 1992, starring Tilda Swinton in the title role. A stage adaption by Sarah Ruhl premiered in New York City in 2010, with another version adapted by Neil Bartlett premiering at the Garrick Theatre, London in 2022 starring Emma Corrin and directed by Michael Grandage. The novel has also been adapted into operatic works.

The novel entered the public domain in the United States in 2024.

== Plot ==
The eponymous hero is born as a male nobleman in England during the reign of Elizabeth I. He lives for centuries, meeting some of the literary luminaries of English literature, into modern times, without aging perceptibly. At one point the author notes he has reached the age of 30, though it is about a 100 years since birth. The character undergoes a change of sex after about 100 years and spends the remainder of the narrative as a woman.

=== Chapter One ===
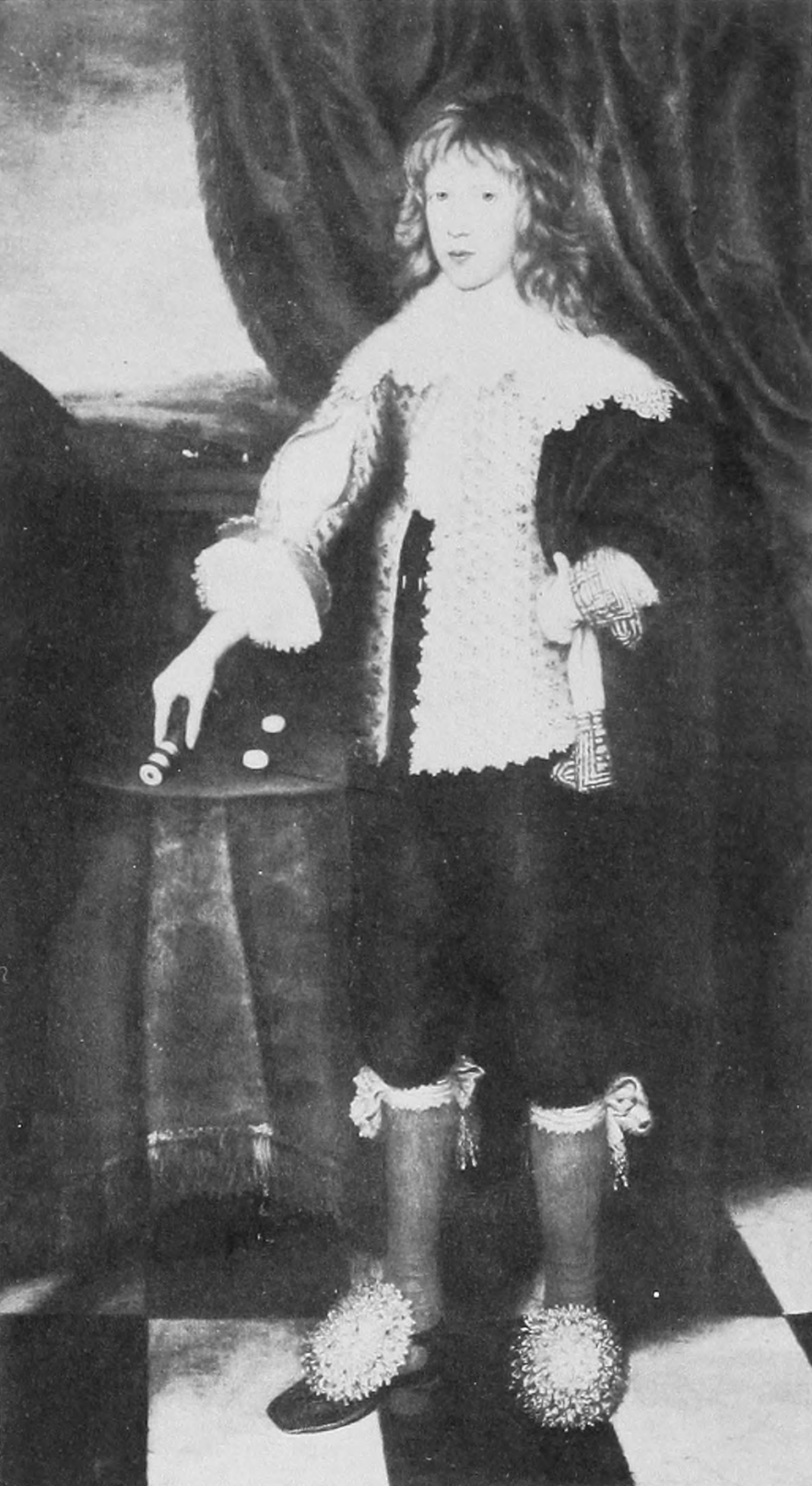
"Orlando as a boy" on the frontispiece. Taken from portrait of the Hon. Edward Sackville from the right half of ‘The Two Sons of Edward, 4th Earl of Dorset’ by Cornelius Nuie.

As a teenage boy, the handsome Orlando serves as a page at the Elizabethan court and becomes the "favourite" of the elderly queen. After Elizabeth's death, he falls deeply in love with Sasha, an elusive and somewhat feral princess in the entourage of the Russian embassy. This episode, of love and ice skating against the background of the celebrated Frost Fair held on the frozen Thames River during the Great Frost of 1608, when "birds froze in mid air and fell like stones to the ground", inspired some of Virginia Woolf's most bravura writing:

Great statesmen, in their beards and ruffs, despatched affairs of state under the crimson awning of the Royal Pagoda ... Frozen roses fell in showers when the Queen and her ladies walked abroad ... Near London Bridge, where the river had frozen to a depth of some twenty fathoms, a wrecked wherry boat was plainly visible, lying on the bed of the river where it had sunk last autumn, overladen with apples. The old bumboat woman, who was carrying her fruit to market on the Surrey side, sat there in her plaids and farthingales with her lap full of apples, for all the world as if she were about to serve a customer, though a certain blueness about the lips hinted the truth.

The melting of the ice coincides with Sasha's unfaithfulness and sudden departure for Russia.

=== Chapter Two ===
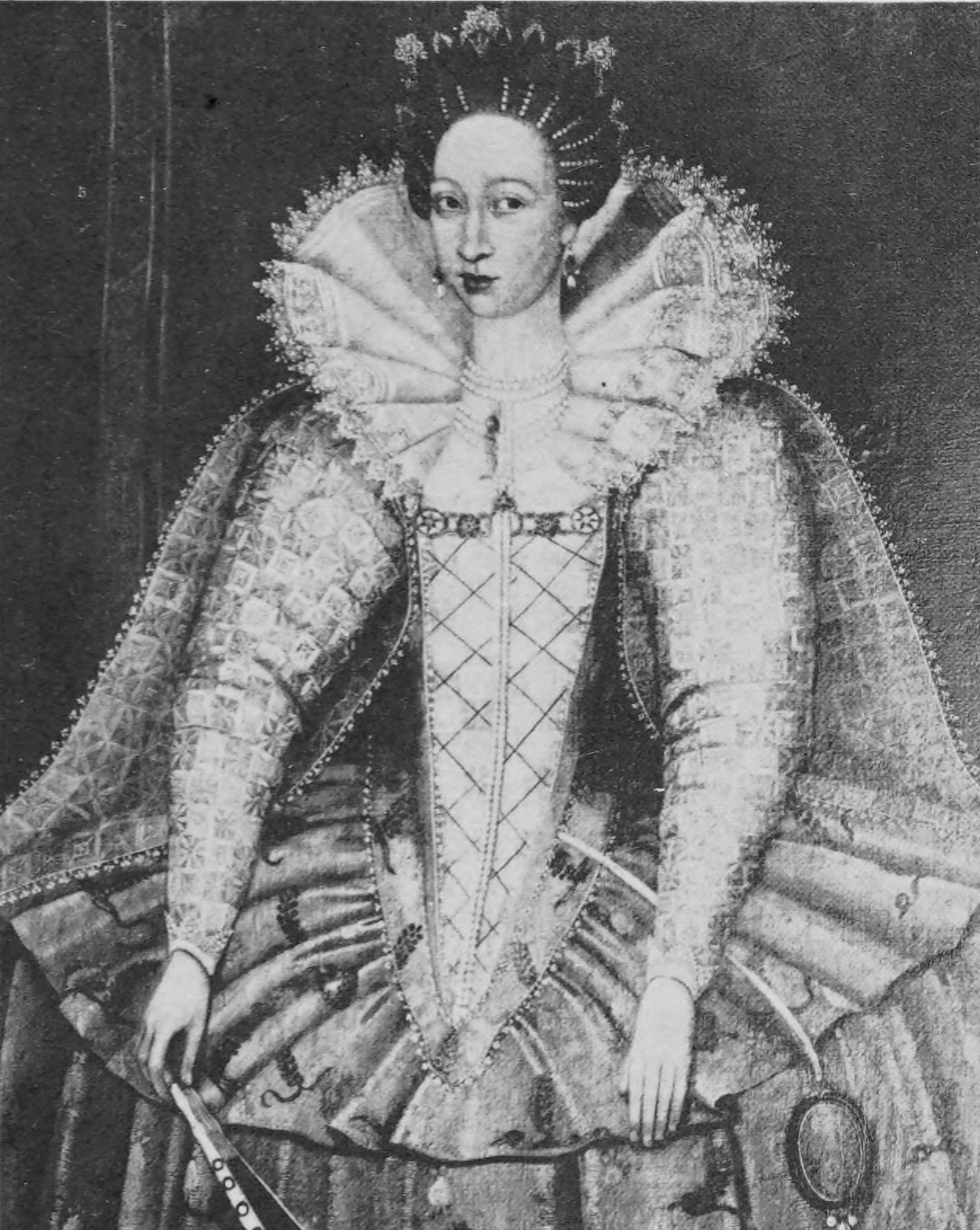
"Archduchess Harriet" facing page 114. Taken from a portrait of Mary, 4th Countess of Dorset, by Marcus Gheeraerts.

The desolate Orlando returns to writing The Oak Tree, a long poem started and abandoned in his youth. He meets and hospitably entertains an invidious poetaster, Nicholas Greene, who proceeds to find fault with Orlando's writing. Later Orlando feels betrayed on learning that he has been lampooned in one of Greene's subsequent works. A period of contemplating love and life leads Orlando to appreciate the value of his ancestral stately home, which he proceeds to furnish lavishly. There he plays host to the populace.

Ennui sets in and Orlando feels harassed by a persistent suitor, the tall and somewhat androgynous Archduchess Harriet, leading Orlando to look for a way to leave the country.

=== Chapter Three ===
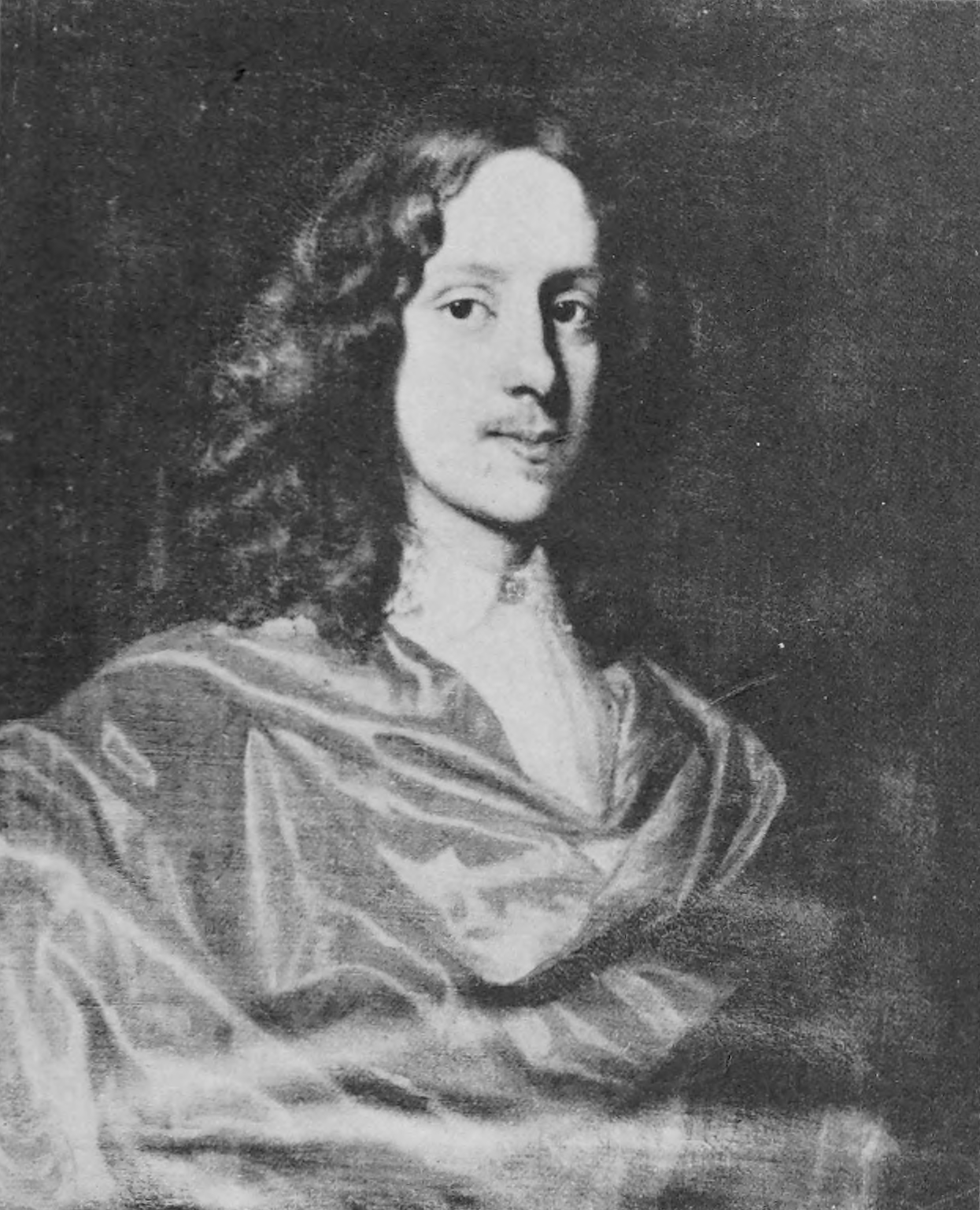
"Orlando as Ambassador" facing page 126. Taken from a portrait of Richard Sackville, 5th Earl of Dorset, by Robert Walker.

He is appointed by King Charles II as ambassador to Constantinople. Orlando performs his duties well, until a night of civil unrest and murderous riots. He falls asleep for a period of days, and others cannot rouse him. Orlando awakens to find that he has metamorphosed into a woman – the same person, with the same personality and intellect, but in a woman's body. Although the narrator of the novel professes to be disturbed and befuddled by Orlando's change, the fictional Orlando complacently accepts the change. From here on, Orlando's amorous inclinations change frequently, although she stays biologically female.

The now Lady Orlando covertly escapes Constantinople in the company of a Romani clan. She adopts their way of life until its essential conflict with her upbringing leads her to head home.

=== Chapter Four ===
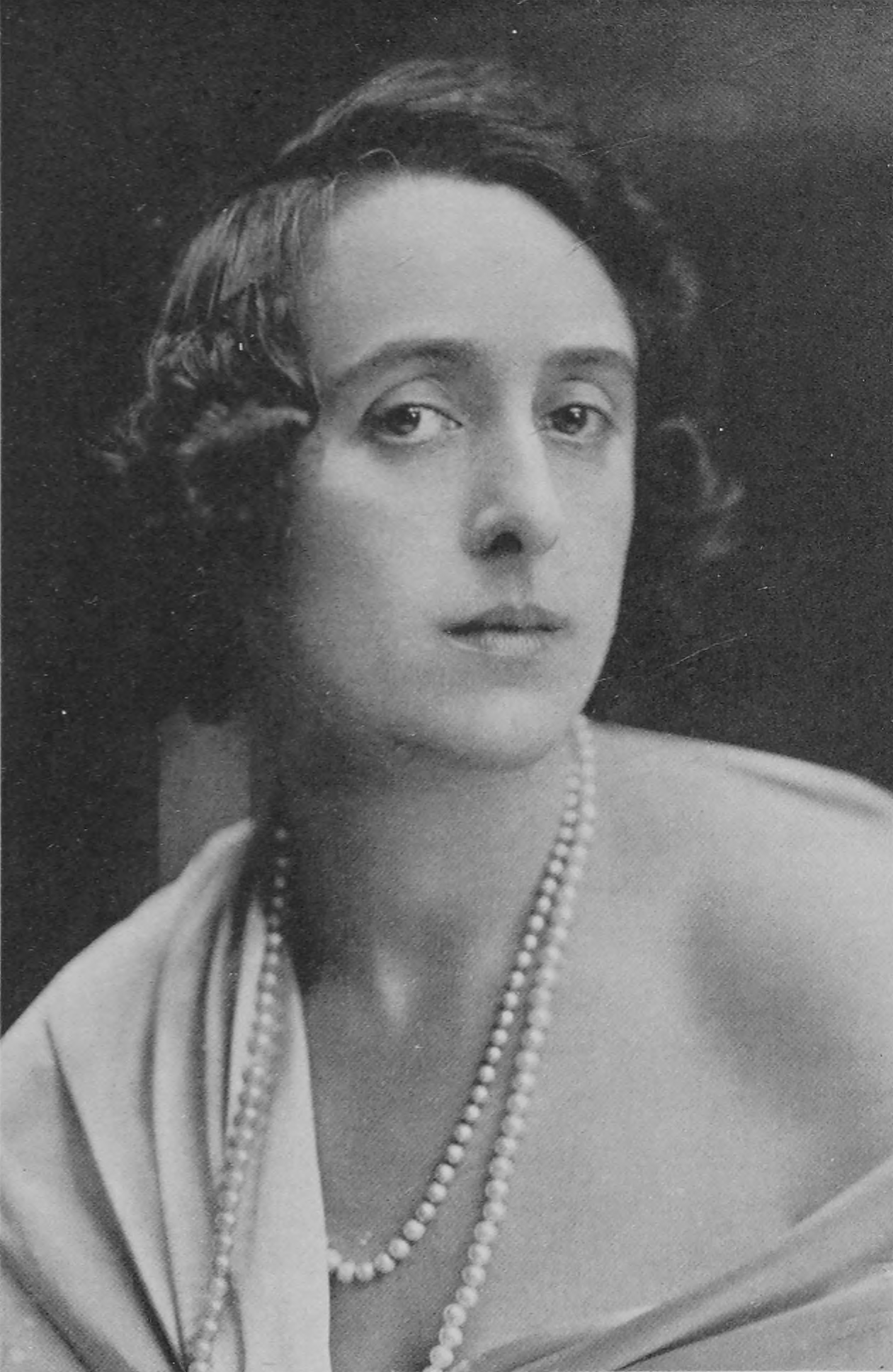
"Orlando on her return from England", facing page 158. Taken from a portrait of Vita Sackville-West, taken by Lenare (Leonard George Green) in 1927.

Only on the ship back to England, with her constraining female clothes and an incident in which a flash of her ankle nearly results in a sailor's falling to his death, does she realise the magnitude of becoming a woman. She concludes it has an overall advantage, declaring "Praise God I'm a woman!" Back in England, Orlando is hounded again by the archduchess, who now reveals herself to be a man, the Archduke Harry. Orlando evades his marriage proposals. She goes on to switch gender roles, dressing alternately as a man and woman.

Orlando engages energetically with life in the eighteenth century, holding court with great poets, notably Alexander Pope, Joseph Addison, and Jonathan Swift.

=== Chapter Five ===
Life in 19th Century England begins with a pervasive damp, which invades both homes and hearts: "The damp struck within. Men felt the chill in their hearts; the damp in their minds. In a desperate effort to snuggle their feelings into some sort of warmth one subterfuge was tried after another. Love, birth, and death were all swaddled in a variety of fine phrases. The sexes drew further and further apart. No open conversation was tolerated. Evasions and concealments were sedulously practised on both sides."

=== Chapter Six ===
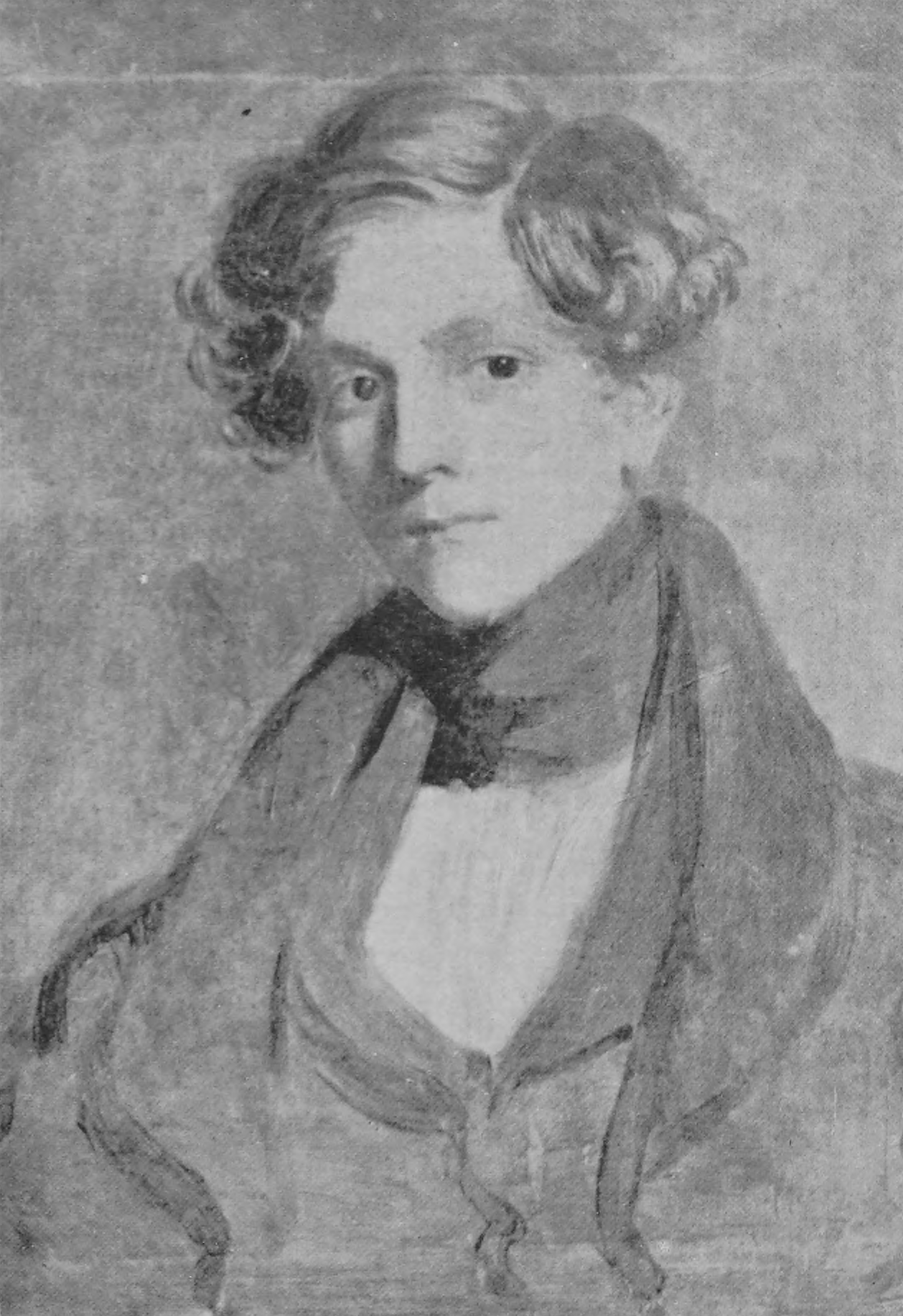
"Marmaduke Bonthrop Shelmerdine, Esquire" at page 262. Unknown model and artist, circa 1820, in Nigel Nicolson’s private collection, Sissinghurst.

Once the book shifts to the twentieth century, she again encounters critic Nick Greene, apparently also timeless, who reappears and promotes Orlando's writing, promising to help her publish The Oak Tree.

Orlando wins a lawsuit over her property and marries a sea captain, Marmaduke Bonthrop Shelmerdine. Like Orlando, he is gender non-conforming, and Orlando attributes the success of their marriage to this similarity. In 1928, she publishes The Oak Tree, centuries after starting it, and wins a prize. In the novel's ending, Orlando's husband flies over the mansion in an aeroplane, which hovers above Orlando until Shelmerdine leaps to the ground. A stray bird flies over his head and Orlando exults, "It's the goose! The wild goose!" The novel ends on the final stroke of midnight on Thursday, 11 October 1928 (the day the novel was published).

== Inspiration ==
Woolf and Vita Sackville-West were both members of the Bloomsbury Group, which was known for its liberal views on sexuality. The two began a sexual and romantic relationship that lasted for a decade, and continued as a friendship long after that. Notably, this inspiration is confirmed by Woolf herself, who noted in her diary the idea of Orlando on 5 October 1927: "And instantly the usual exciting devices enter my mind: a biography beginning in the year 1500 and continuing to the present day, called Orlando: Vita; only with a change about from one sex to the other".

Nigel Nicolson, Sackville-West's son, wrote, "The effect of Vita on Virginia is all contained in Orlando, the longest and most charming love letter in literature, in which she explores Vita, weaves her in and out of the centuries, tosses her from one sex to the other, plays with her, dresses her in furs, lace and emeralds, teases her, flirts with her, drops a veil of mist around her."

== Analysis ==
The novel has been the subject of much analysis, focused on the one hand on potential readings as a kind of "fantastical" biography of or love letter to Vita Sackville-West, and on the other on the novel as a vehicle for "revolutionary" views on gender and identity. Some critics have noted this very melding and fantastasizing of the personal and universal aspects of the novel is key to its themes.

=== Direct ties to Vita Sackville-West ===
Certain subjects are directly inspired by Vita Sackville-West and her relationship to Woolf. Sackville-West and Woolf wrote back and forth about the Romani people often, romanticizing (and exoticizing) them but also perhaps identifying with their perceived transgressiveness against English society and its strict gendered roles and heterosexual expectations. Orlando meets a Romani witch, Rosina Pepita, who shares a name with Sackville-West's grandmother who was a Spanish dancer. However, Orlando remains an English aristocrat regardless of her sex, and fails to adjust to the nomadic lifestyle of the Romani caravan as it wanders across the Balkans and Anatolia. In real life, Sackville-West fantasized about joining a Romani caravan, but she did not really wish to give up the settled life of the aristocracy for living in poverty, or to be subject to the same discrimination as the Romani.

Woolf also satirizes the sexist British inheritance laws which caused Sackville-West's childhood home, Knole, to pass to her male cousin instead of herself. Orlando has to sue to keep her own inherited property after Britain discovers she has become a woman, but the state does ultimately rule in her favor. By representing and sometimes fictionally reversing Sackville-West's real-life losses in Orlando, Woolf may be using the novel as "a metaphorical recovery of what Woolf and Sackville-West could not, as women and as lovers, have."

=== Gender and sexuality ===
The fantastical nature of the novel has been interpreted as simultaneously addressing the "tensions between the real and the fictional/fantastic and the public and private" while also being a political necessity, as more realistic sapphic novels could be banned for obscenity in Britain at the time.

=== Language and representation ===
The American scholar Victoria Smith argued that a major theme of the book is the impossibility of representing the female experience in its entirety. Orlando feels unable to properly describe emotions, people and even such banal occurrences as a sunset. Throughout the book, Orlando cannot describe Sasha or nature, the biographer cannot properly write up a description of Orlando, and the love which Orlando feels for Shelmerdine is referred to as undefinable. Orlando attempts to describe objects he loves or find beautiful with flowery language and unsuitable metaphors, which frustrates him. However, even though the images used to convey the objects are "false", some truths the objects are nonetheless conveyed.

=== Racism ===
Woolf's handling of race in Orlando has been criticized for issues stemming from her "Orientalist preoccupation with racialized bodies." The novel includes slurs in the voice of the biographer-narrator, who is identified at least partially with Woolf herself, toward Black people and Romani people. Some critics defend the treatment of race in the novel as Woolf's deliberate "critique of Empire, [and] parody of a certain kind of biography." Others question whether the words of the Woolf stand-in narrator can really be read in "the register of some other power not [Woolf's]." Ultimately, it can seem that Woolf does not treat the complexities of race and Empire with the same depths of care that she does Orlando's own identity.

Other critics have drawn attention to the problematic depiction of Black female figures, particularly the scene in which Orlando "kisses a Negro woman in the dark". Literary scholar Jane Marcus points out in her analysis that Woolf, through this phrasing, reproduces a colonial fantasy in which Black women are turned into exoticized, sexualized objects. This portrayal is closely connected to the life of Vita Sackville-West, whose family lived with Afro-Caribbean servants in colonial England.

In Orlando, the "Negro woman" thus becomes a projection surface for both sexual and national ambivalences. She symbolizes the possibility of transgressive (racial as well as gendered) desire but remains linguistically and narratively silent. According to Jane Marcus, Woolf's engagement with gender and nationality reaches its limit here, within a white feminist discourse that ignores or subordinates colonial history and Black presence in England.

=== Commentary on British culture ===
Woolf was often critical of the patriarchal nature of contemporary approaches to history. The novel takes place over several commonly-accepted eras of British history, namely the Renaissance, the Restoration, the Enlightenment, the Romantic, the Victorian and the present, but Woolf treats them ironically, making caricatures of them and their supposed excessive influence on Orlando's mind and habits. This was, in part, a critique by reductio ad absurdum of the "sociological" approach to literary history outlined by her own father, Sir Leslie Stephen. Stephen identified various writers, all of them men, as the "key" figures of an age, whereas Woolf wanted historians to pay attention to the women writers that they usually ignored. For example, when Orlando was a man, he had no hesitations about showing off his manuscript for The Oak Tree, but as a woman, she constantly hides it when visitors come, as Jane Austen was alleged to do with the manuscripts for her books.

At the same time, Woolf, though she was critical of many aspects of British life, felt a deep sense of affinity in her country, where the past seemed to live on in so many ways. Woolf explored in Orlando the idea of the English past is not dead, but still always with us, through ageless, timeless nature of the eponymous character. The weather and character with which Woolf typifies each era has been interpreted as metaphorical for Woolf's views of them. She shows the Victorian era as rainy and dark, with sunshine returning in the Edwardian era. The Renaissance, in contrast to John Ruskin's views of the Elizabethan-Jacobean era as a "frost," is portrayed as one of rebirth and vitality, including Orlando first falling in love with the Russian princess Sasha.

Additionally, that Orlando's transformation occurs during the course of anti-Christian riots by the Muslim population of Constantinople is Woolf's attack on British imperialism. By the second half of the 17th century, the Ottoman Empire was in decline while the British empire was on the ascent, which is the precise time that Orlando changes sex. Woolf believed that the "Eastern Question" as imperial rivalry for control of Constantinople, "the city of all the world's desire" as it sits at a strategic location where Europe and Asia meet, to have been one of the main causes of the First World War, and by dating Orlando's transformation at the moment that the Ottoman Empire began to decline was a political point. One of the main justifications for the British empire was the alleged need to protect white women from being raped by non-white men, and having Lady Orlando escape from Constantinople without a man to protect her was an attack upon this theory.

== Influence and recognition ==
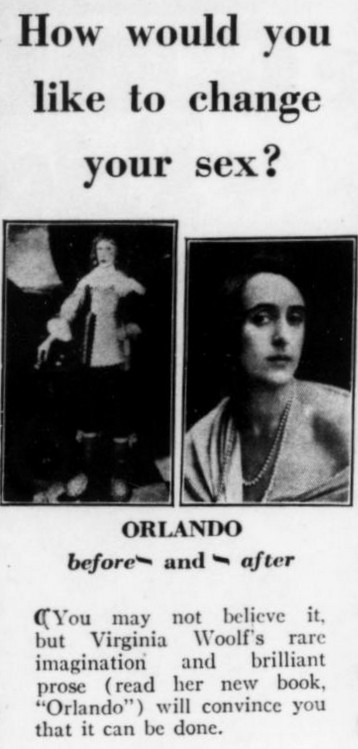
Detail of an ad for Orlando run by Harcourt, Brace and Company in the New Yorker, 17 November 1928

Orlando was a contemporary success, both critically and financially, and guaranteed the Woolfs' financial stability. It was generally viewed not just as high literature, but as a gossipy novel about Sackville-West. However, the New York Times review of the book acknowledged the importance of the work as an experiment into new forms of literature.

The work has been the subject of numerous scholarly writings, including detailed treatment in multiple works on Virginia Woolf. (Note: See for example, Kelley, Alice van Buren (1973). The Novels of Virginia Woolf: Fact and Vision. Chicago: University of Chicago Press. ISBN 0-226-42985-7. OCLC 794933.) An "annotated" edition has been published to facilitate critical reading of the text.

The novel's title has also come to stand in some senses for women's writing generally, as one of the most famous works by a woman author that directly treats the subject of gender. (Note: For example: Harpman, Jacqueline (1996). Orlanda. Paris: Éditions Grasset. ISBN 2-246-53211-6. OCLC 36241484.. Published in English translation in 1999 (ISBN 1-58322-011-9).) For example, a project at the University of Alberta and University of Guelph on the history of women's writing in the British Isles was named after the book.

A literary critique of Orlando on an onomastic and psychological basis was conducted by the historian and Italianist Alessio Bologna in his book L'Orlando ariostesco in Virginia Woolf.

The skating party on the Thames was featured in Simple Gifts, a Christmas collection of six animated shorts shown on PBS in 1977.

In 1979, Argentine writer Rodolfo Fogwill published the story "Memoria de paso", about a woman who transitions to man and lives for centuries without aging. A direct reinterpretation of Woolf's Orlando, the story is a satire of the perceived ciclic structure of Argentinian history. The protagonist even meets an English writer named Virginia, and is said to share her birth name with her.

The 1981 film Freak Orlando, by German artist, writer, and director Ulrike Ottinger, is an adaptation of the story, blending it with aspects of Tod Browning's 1932 seminal horror film Freaks.

The novel has been adapted for theatre and film. In 1989 the American director Robert Wilson, and writer Darryl Pinckney collaborated on a theatrical production. A British film adaptation was released in 1992, directed by Sally Potter and starring Tilda Swinton as Orlando and Quentin Crisp as Queen Elizabeth I.

A second theatre adaptation of Orlando, by Sarah Ruhl, was first presented by the Piven Theatre Workshop in Evanston, Illinois in 1998. It was presented by The Actors' Gang Theater in Los Angeles in 2003. The play premiered Off-Broadway in New York in 2010. It subsequently premiered for the Sydney Theatre Company in Australia at the Sydney Opera House starring Jacqueline McKenzie in the title role. The play had a major New York revival in 2024 at Signature Theatre Company directed by Will Davis, with Taylor Mac in the title role and featuring an ensemble of LGBTQ+ and gender nonconforming performers.

In 2016, composer Peter Aderhold and librettist Sharon L. Joyce premiered an opera based on the work at the Braunschweig State Theater, and an opera by Olga Neuwirth premiered in the Vienna State Opera in December 2019. Another opera adaptation was premiered in Finland, August 2023, a chamber opera Orlando in Finnish, Swedish and English for one singer and seven instruments. The music was composed by Johanna Almark, who also served as a co-librettist.

In 2015, The Royal Ballet premiered Wayne McGregor’s contemporary ballet Woolf Works, based on Woolf’s life and work; Orlando is the basis for the second act, ‘Becomings’.

The League of Extraordinary Gentlemen comics feature Orlando, starting with a mention in The New Traveller's Almanac and short story and cameo in Black Dossier. Orlando is then featured as a main character in Volume III: Century and Volume IV: The Tempest.

On 5 November 2019, BBC News listed Orlando on its list of the 100 most inspiring novels.

In November 2022, a new theatre adaptation by Neil Bartlett, directed by Michael Grandage, and starring Emma Corrin opened at the Garrick Theatre in London's West End.

In 2023, writer and theorist Paul B. Preciado directed Orlando, My Political Biography, which freely adapts the novel into a documentary about contemporary transgender life and identity. It stars 21 trans and non-binary people as Orlando.

In 2024, a musical adaptation of the novel premiered off-Broadway at Theatre Row, with music by Cynthia Saunders, lyrics by Tricia Dunn and Cynthia Saunders, and book by Nora Brigid Monahan. The production was directed by Kimille Howard and starred Evie Schuckman as Orlando and Emily Young as Virginia Woolf.
