= Magdalena Montezuma =

German actress

- Born: Erika Kluge; October 2, 1942; Würzburg, Nazi Germany (present-day Germany)
- Died: July 15, 1984 (aged 41); West Berlin, West Germany (present-day Germany)

Magdalena Montezuma (born Erika Kluge; 2 October 1942 - 15 July 1984) was a German actress known for her collaborations with avant-garde New German Cinema filmmakers, including Werner Schroeter, Ulrike Ottinger, Rainer Werner Fassbinder, and Rosa von Praunheim. Her distinct acting style is marked by heightened gesture, a penetrating gaze, and a histrionic sensibility.

== Life and career ==
Born in Würzburg, Montezuma spent much of her youth in a plaster cast due to tuberculosis of the spinal marrow. She later lived in Dresden before attending university in Heidelberg, where she studied art history, Romance languages, and literature. It was here that she first met Schroeter, who along with von Praunheim gave her the name Magdalena Montezuma, after a rival actress of the protagonist in Patrick Dennis's novel Little Me, and more vaguely as an invocation of Moctezuma II or the Tohono O'odham creation story.

Montezuma went on to star in many of Schroeter's films, including his debut feature Eika Katappa, which premiered at the Directors' Fortnight section in Cannes in 1970. She has been described as his muse, well-suited to his non-linear filmmaking. Montezuma and Schroeter lived together in Munich working on films together at night. During the day, Montezuma worked jobs as a telephone operator and in a delivery shop to support them. Montezuma also ran the business side of her films with Schroeter, handling correspondence with film labs and distributors. She slept very little and used Captagon to stay awake.

Montezeuma was diagnosed with cancer in 1982. During filming of The Rose King, devised with Schroeter after her diagnosis to be her swan song, she expressed a desire to die on set. In the end, she died at her apartment in Berlin on 15 July 1984.

== Selected filmography ==
- Eika Katappa (1969, Werner Schroeter)
- The Niklashausen Journey (1970, Rainer Werner Fassbinder and Michael Fengler)
- Der Bomberpilot (1970, Schroeter, TV Film)
- Macbeth Opera von Rosa von Praunheim (1971, Rosa von Praunheim, TV Film) - Lady Macbeth
- Rio das Mortes (1971, Fassbinder, TV Film) - Hannas Kollegin
- Salome (1971, Schroeter, TV film) - Herodes
- Beware of a Holy Whore (1971, Fassbinder) - Irm
- Macbeth (1971, Schroeter, TV film) - Lady Macbeth
- The Death of Maria Malibran (1972, Schroeter) - Maria Malibran
- Willow Springs (1973, Schroeter)
- World on a Wire (1973, Fassbinder, TV serial) - Party Guest
- Der schwarze Engel (1974, Schroeter)
- Joan's Dream (Johannas Traum, 1975, Schroeter) - Saint Joan
- Goldflocken (1976, Schroeter) - Magdalena, Josette, The Angel of Death
- Execution: A Study of Mary (1979, Elfi Mikesch)
- Ticket of No Return (1979, Ulrike Ottinger) - Soziale Frage
- Palermo or Wolfsburg (1980, Schroeter) - Verteidigerin
- Taxi zum Klo (1980, Frank Ripploh) - Nurse
- Day of the Idiots (1981, Schroeter) - Zigeunerin
- Freak Orlando (1981, Ottinger) - Orlando
- Macumba (1982, Mikesch) - Magda/Isabelle
- Liebeskonzil (1982, Schroeter) - Doppelzeugin
- Kiez (1983, Walter Bockmayer and Rolf Bührmann)
- A Woman in Flames (1983, Robert van Ackeren)
- Pankow '95 (1983, Gábor Altorjay) - Bethermann
- Dorian Gray in the Mirror of the Yellow Press (1984, Ottinger) - Golem/Norn
- The Rose King (1986) - Anna, The Mother
