= Tabea Blumenschein =

German actress and writer (1952–2020)

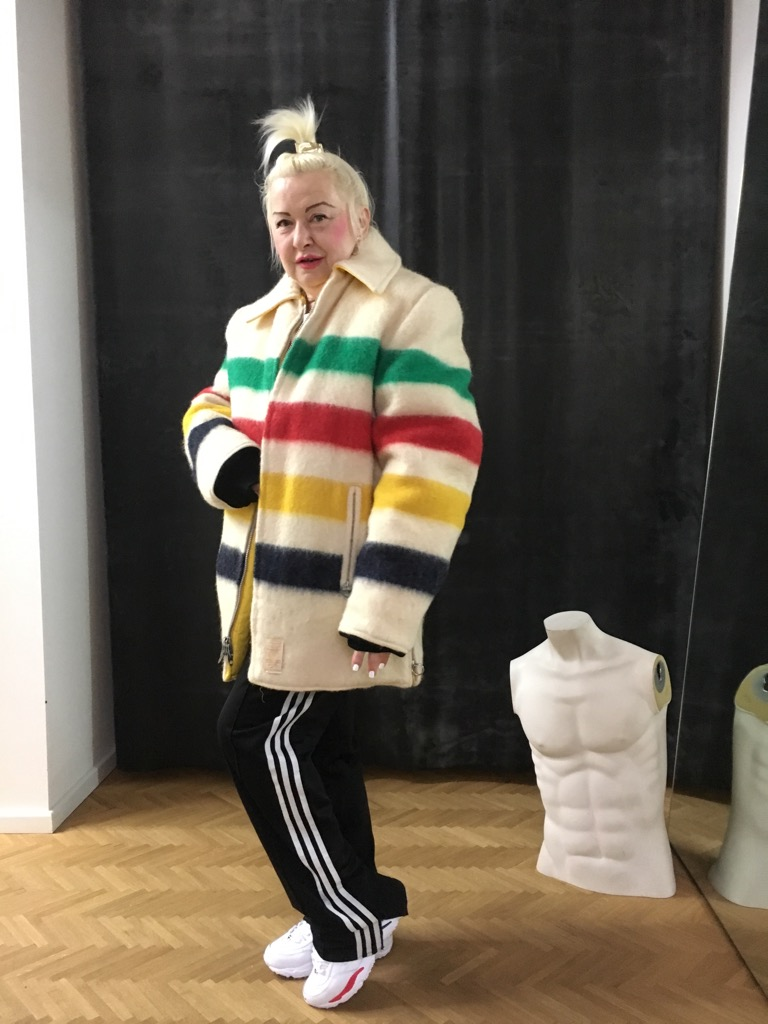
- Born: 11 August 1952; Rietheim, West Germany
- Died: 2 March 2020 (aged 67); Berlin, Germany
- Education: Bodensee Art School Konstanz
- Occupations: Painter, actress, film director, screenwriter, costume/set designer and musician
- Years active: 1973–2020
- Awards: Deutscher Filmpreis (Gold) – Best Production Design (Bestes Szenenbild) – 1981

Tabea Blumenschein (11 August 1952 – 29 February 2020) was a German painter, actress, film director, screenwriter, costume/set designer and musician. Largely known for her acting, and starring roles in films by Ulrike Ottinger, Blumenschein was a multidisciplinary artist, who later in life focused her art on physical media and drawing.

Blumenschein was born in Rietheim, West Germany. She studied art at Kunstschule Konstanz (1968–1972) and moved to West Berlin in 1973. She then starred in 5 films by Ulrike Ottinger, and rose to fame in the West Berlin art scene in the 1970s, before retreating from public view in the 1980s.

Blumenschein spent most of her life making art; realising stage and film designs, creating fashion drawings, illustrations and taking photographs. In 1979, She designed the collection "Big Birds" for Berlin Knitweardesigner Claudia Skoda which was presented at Berlin Kongresshalle. She was awarded the Deutscher Filmpreis in Gold 1981 for her set design for the film Looping.

In the 1980s, Blumenschein collaborated with the performance art and music group Die Tödliche Doris and recorded with Gudrun Gut, Bettina Koester, Frieder Butzmann, and with Die Dominas. She additionally did costume design for the groups performance costumes.

Blumenschein died in Berlin, aged 67.

== Personal life ==
Blumenschein was a lesbian, and known to have been in a relationship with Ulrike Ottinger in the 1970s. They moved to West Berlin together in 1973/1974. She also dated novelist Patricia Highsmith, and is noted as a source of inspiration on Highsmith's novel The Boy Who Followed Ripley. Blumenschein was featured on the front page of Stern magazine in 1985 with her girlfriend at the time under the title "Women who Love Women", designating her public coming-out.

Blumenschein was a prominent figure in the West Berlin bar scene, and enjoyed partaking in gender-bending and watching drag king performances.

== Film career ==
An artist and actor, Blumenschein was a frequent collaborator and lead actress in many films of her lifelong friend – Ulrike Ottinger. In Ticket of No Return, Blumenschein starred as "the lady drinker" and was additionally the costume designer.

== Filmography ==
- Laokoon & Söhne (Ulrike Ottinger and Tabea Blumenschein 1973)
- The Enchantment of the Blue Sailors (Die Betörung der blauen Matrosen), (Ulrike Ottinger and Tabea Blumenschein 1975)
- Portrait Marianne Rosenberg, (Rosa von Praunheim 1976)
- Madame X: An Absolute Ruler (Madame X – Eine absolute Herrscherin), (Ulrike Ottinger 1977)
- Ticket of No Return (Bildnis einer Trinkerin), (Ulrike Ottinger 1979)
- Taxi zum Klo, (Frank Ripploh, 1980)
- Das Graupelberhuhn (Die Tödliche Doris 1982)
- Sportliche Schatten – Kunst in Krisenzeiten (black&white, S-8, with Udo Kier, direction and script: Tabea Blumenschein 1982)
- Looping. The Long Dream of Short Happiness (Walter Bockmayer and Rolf Bührmann 1981) (Set Designer)
- Uliisses, (Werner Nekes 1982)
- Dorian Gray in the Mirror of the Yellow Press. (Ulrike Ottinger 1984)
- Zagarbata, (super-8 film, 16 mm) (director and script: Tabea Blumenschein, 1985)
- Loving Highsmith (Eva Vitija 2022)
