= Tally Brown, New York =

1979 film by Rosa von Praunheim

- Theatrical release poster
- Directed by: Rosa von Praunheim
- Produced by: Rosa von Praunheim; Joachim von Mengershausen
- Starring: Tally Brown; Holly Woodlawn; Divine; Taylor Mead; Ching Ho Cheng; Edward Caton
- Cinematography: Edvard Lieber; Michael Oblowitz; Rosa von Praunheim; Juliana Wang; Lloyd Williams
- Edited by: Mike Shephard; Rosa von Praunheim
- Music by: Tally Brown; Holly Woodlawn
- Release date: 4 May 1979
- Running time: 97 minutes
- Countries: Germany; United States
- Language: English

Tally Brown, New York is a 1979 documentary film directed, written and produced by Rosa von Praunheim, that focuses on the career of Tally Brown. It features interviews and commentary from legendary scenesters of the day.

== Plot ==
The film follows the singing and acting career of Tally Brown, a classically trained opera and blues singer who became a star of the New York underground scene in the late 1960s.

In this documentary, von Praunheim draws on extensive interviews with Brown, in which she shares her collaborations with Andy Warhol, Taylor Mead and other artists, and friendships with Ching Ho Cheng, Holly Woodlawn and Divine.

Brown opens the film with a cover of David Bowie's Heroes and closes with Rock 'n' Roll Suicide. The film not only captures Tally Brown's career, but also a certain New York milieu of the 1970s.

== Cast ==
- Tally Brown
- Paul Ambrose
- Edward Caton
- Divine
- Gil Fontaine
- Elizabeth Kashy
- Ching Ho Cheng
- Robert Kashy
- Taylor Mead
- Magdalena Montezuma
- Rosa von Praunheim
- Andy Warhol
- Holly Woodlawn

== Background ==
Praunheim said he met Brown through the gay journalist Brandon Judel, and that she was "very, very difficult, a true diva."

I admired her a lot, but she always let me feel that I was an amateur, never professional enough. She made me wait half a year to film her concert because she had to fix her teeth. Shortly before she died we had a show in New York with her in attendance. She loved it and acknowledged that I was the only person who documented her life.

One of the filming locations in the film was Ching Ho Cheng's apartment on the 6th floor at the Hotel Chelsea, where Arthur Miller used to live during his separation from Marilyn Monroe. Cheng has a scene in his suite with Brown.

== Release ==
The film premiered in San Francisco on 1 May 1979 at the Pacific Film Archive, and was then screened in June 1979, at the San Francisco Cinematheque. In 1980, Brown gave live performances in conjunction with the screening of the film at the Performing Garage in SoHo, New York City.

== Reception ==
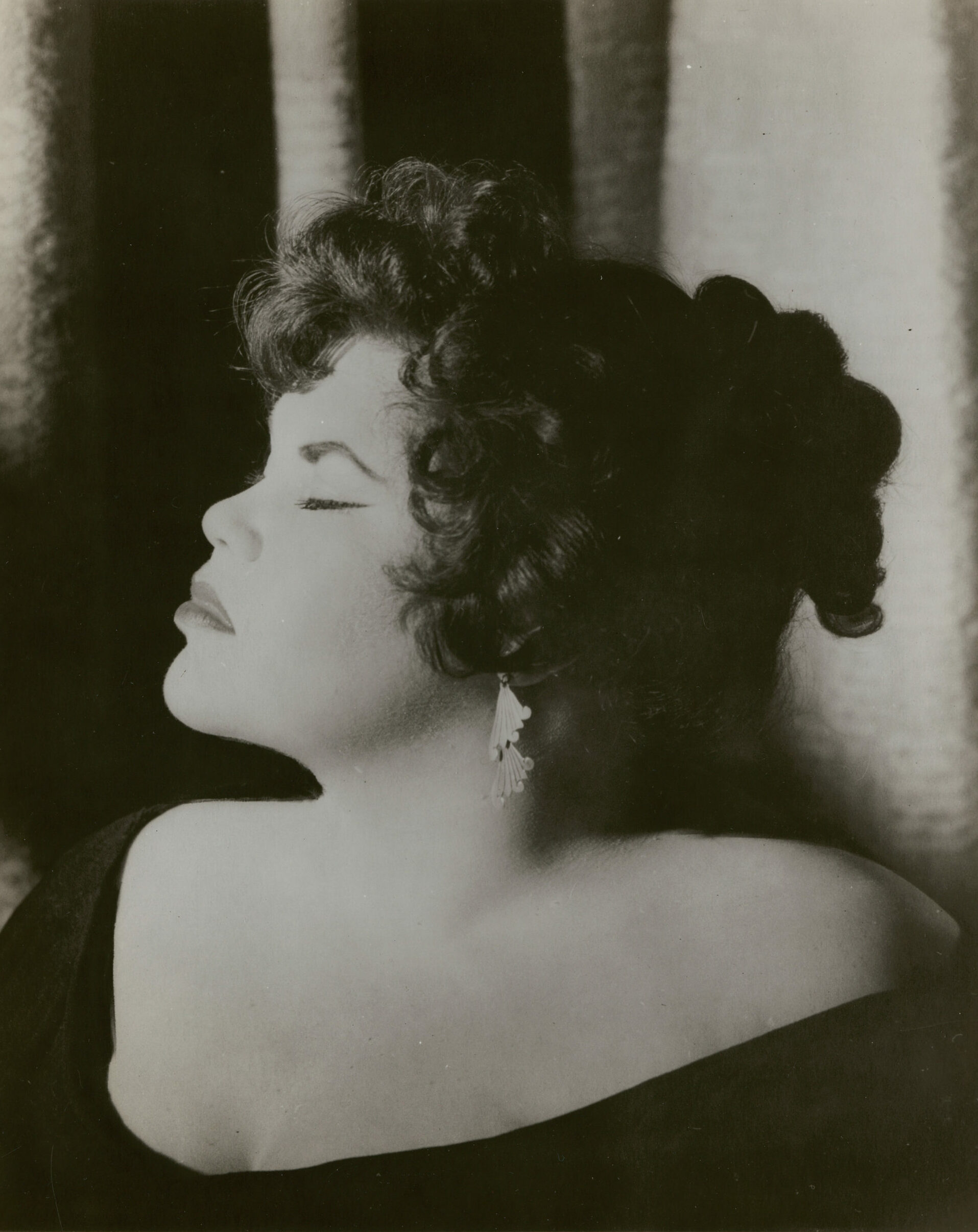
New York City singer and actress Tally Brown, circa 1950s.

Melissa Anderson from the Village Voice wrote the film is "a must-see for all those interested in performance and the cultural history of New York in the '70s; the bewigged Miss Brown, with false eyelashes capable of sending her short, round body aloft, is the most mesmerizing raconteur and cabaret artist you'll hear."

Pat Graham from the Chicago Reader opined that "Tally Brown, was one of the stars of the New York 60s underground circuit, who reemerged briefly in the punk-strewn late 70s to find, alas, that the subcultural cutting edge had passed her by; an oblique commentary on avant-garde aging and oblivion."

Film critic Michael Bronski wrote it is a "fairly straightforward interview/documentary of the Warhol set in the East Village; it is interesting more for a historical context than as fine filmmaking; it is clear that von Praunheim's lurid visual sensibilities are not at work here." Critic Kevin Thomas said that "Brown is a hefty, bizarre-looking cabaret singer of exquisite diction and compelling presence, a remarkably candid and perceptive woman, a determinedly brave and free spirit."

British film director Peter Strickland said "this is not only a documentary on the flamboyant chanteuse and actor Tally Brown, but also a highly evocative portrait of late–70s New York and its long–extinct illicit zones such as the Continental Baths; its parade of downtown luminaries such as Taylor Mead, Divine and Holly Woodlawn supply ample cultural wattage for viewers unfamiliar with Brown herself."

== Awards ==
- 1979: German Film Award (for best non-feature film)
- 1979: Nominated for the Gold Hugo at the Chicago International Film Festival

== See also ==
- Cinema of Germany
- Counterculture of the 1960s
- List of German films of the 1970s
- List of LGBTQ-related films of 1979
- Tally Brown filmography
