= Zheng Yuxiu =

Chinese lawyer and activist

- 鄭毓秀
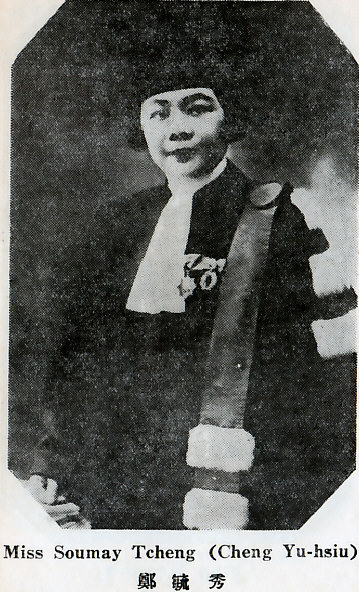
- Who's Who in China 4th ed. (1931)
- Born: March 20, 1891; Xin'an County, Guangdong, China (Qing dynasty)
- Died: December 16, 1959 (aged 68); Los Angeles, California, United States
- Other name: Soumay Tcheng
- Occupations: Lawyer, judge, revolutionary, politician, writer
- Political party: Chinese Nationalist Party
- Spouse: Wei Tao-ming
- Relatives: Ching Ho Cheng, Paifong Robert Cheng

Zheng Yuxiu
- Traditional Chinese: 鄭毓秀
- Simplified Chinese: 郑毓秀
Transcriptions
Standard Mandarin
- Hanyu Pinyin: Zhèng Yùxiù
- Wade–Giles: Cheng4 Yü4-hsiu4
Yue: Cantonese
- Jyutping: Zeng⁶ Juk¹-sau³

Zheng Yuxiu (Chinese: 鄭毓秀; pinyin: Zhèng Yùxiù; Wade–Giles: Cheng Yü-hsiu, 1891–1959), (Note: Also known in western sources as Tcheng Yu-hsiu, Soumay Tcheng, Soumé Tcheng and Madame Wei Tao-ming) was a Chinese lawyer, judge, revolutionary, and legislator. Zheng was the first female judge in modern Chinese history.

Zheng participated in Sun Yat-sen's revolutionary movement leading up to the 1911 Revolution. She then went to Paris and studied at the Faculty of Law of Paris where she earned a doctorate in 1925. Shen then returned to Shanghai to practice law. She was president of a court in the French concession and then served in the national Legislative Yuan, helping to draft the Chinese Republican-era civil code. In 1919, she served on the Chinese delegation to the Paris Peace Conference. From 1931 to 1937 she was president of University of Shanghai school of law.

== Family and education ==
Raised as a young girl in the paternal family home in Guangdong, Zheng was first home-schooled before her mother enrolled her in a formal school in Beijing. Her revolutionary activities began at a young age. She refused to have her feet bound as she saw how the traditional practice had affected her mother who underwent the binding process as a child. She also refused a marriage arranged by her paternal grandmother because she thought her fiance's conservative upbringing and beliefs would be too incompatible with her own lifestyle. Her family sent her to a mission school in Tianjin, where she learned English but chose not to follow the religious instruction. In 1912, she met the anarchist and revolutionary organizer Li Shizeng and enrolled in his preparatory school for Chinese students hoping to go to France on the Diligent Work Frugal Study program. The school was the first in China to be co-educational. She was one of the handful of women to go to France on the program.

== The Revolution of 1911 ==
Zheng was a member of the Kuomintang, the Nationalist Party of China. After meeting the party's leader Sun Yat-sen, she dedicated herself to the revolutionary cause. As a member of a revolutionary cell, Zheng hid bombs in her suitcases to transport them to Beijing with the intention of using them against officials working for the Manchu dynasty. Later she was involved in the attempted assassination of Yuan Shikai, who had taken power from Sun Yat-sen. She fled to France after being notified that she was wanted for arrest by the government for her involvement with the planned attacks.

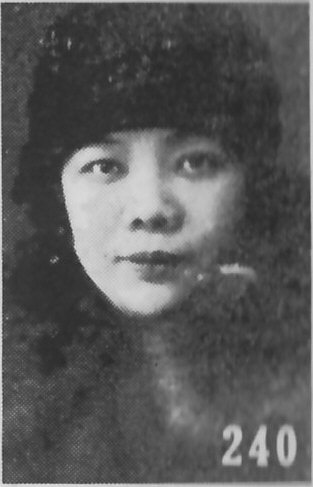
Zheng Yuxiu as pictured in The Most Recent Biographies of Chinese Dignitaries

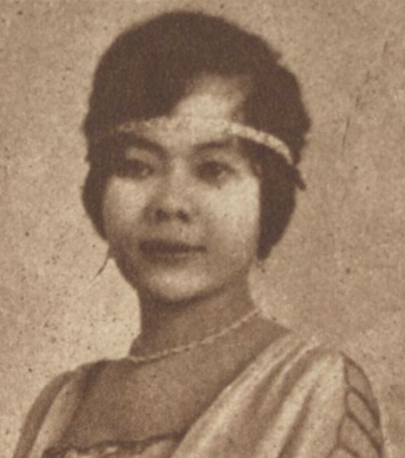
Zheng in 1919

== World War I ==
By 1914, she had established herself in Paris, where historians believe she met other political figures, such as her fellow party member Wang Jingwei. It was difficult for Zheng to adjust to her new life in France as she was not fluent in the language, but later on she considered the country to be similar to China in terms of political aspirations and in spirit. She remained in France for the remainder of World War I. She pursued an education in law at the University of Paris, the Sorbonne and enrolled a year into the war. She urged China to ally itself with the Allied Powers. China entered the war in the year 1917. Zheng was invited to speak at a meeting held at the Sorbonne and acted as a spokesperson for her native country. The French minister of war was also present at this meeting.

Zheng returned to China after 1917 to advocate for Chinese aid to the Allied war effort. Over 100,000 Chinese men volunteered for labor service to support France in combat.

== Paris Peace Conference ==
In 1919, due to her involvement in the 1911 Revolution and her French and English language skills, Zheng Yuxiu was appointed as the sole female Chinese delegate for the Paris Peace Conference along with chief plenipotentiary Lu Zhengxiang and other male delegates and official attachés selected by the Beijing Government and the Nationalists. Zheng was chosen as a delegate so that she would act as the voice of Chinese women and take charge of communication between the delegation and the media. An interview with Andrée Viollis proved the importance of Zheng's role within the delegation. Her image was starkly different to the Western perception of Chinese women, which in turn helped to change Westerners' view of China as well.

She traveled to the United States after the war in hopes of gaining allies in China's quest for sovereignty. President Woodrow Wilson's Fourteen Points speech gave China reason to believe that the United States would be supportive of their goals. However, at the Paris Peace Conference, it was proven otherwise. The United States was in favor of granting Shandong to Japan in fear agitating the nation. This decision was thought as a betrayal in the eyes of Chinese nationals.

=== Rosebush gun incident ===
Zheng was very critical of the Shandong decision. She joined with Chinese students at home and abroad in protesting the signing of the Versailles Treaty in the belief that this agreement would encourage Japan to further reduce Chinese sovereignty. Due to the mounting of pressure from Chinese students and workers, chief delegate Lu Zhengxiang slipped out of Paris on June 27, 1919, on the eve of the signing ceremony. He was rumored to be in the Parisian suburb of St. Cloud en route to signing the agreement.

Upon discovering Lu's location, Zheng and her accomplices traveled to the St. Cloud residence to demand Lu refuse to sign the treaty. Lu refused to open the door, but a secretary carrying a briefcase dashed from the residence towards his car. Sensing something was amiss, Zheng broke off a rosebush branch roughly shaped like a gun and rubbed it with dirt. In her memoir she states: “I stepped out of the shadows in front of him and pointed my rosebush gun right at him. He was so frightened that he inadvertently dropped the portfolio from his arm and immediately took flight.”

Zheng and her group stood vigil over throughout the night. The next morning Lu heard them out and bent to their will. On June 28, 1919, China would be the only Allied nation to not sign the Treaty of Versailles. Zheng kept the rosebush gun as a historical memento and took it back to her family home in Shanghai, China, hiding it away in a drawer wrapped in a white cloth. The rosebush would sadly vanish when the Japanese looted her family home during World War II in 1937.

== Later years ==
Zheng received her law doctorate from the Faculty of Law of Paris in 1925. Zheng and her fellow law student and legal partner Wei Tao-ming would established a law practice in Shanghai. In the late 1920s, Zheng and Wei married. In the late 1920s, she briefly became a judge in a French concession court.

Zheng advocated for women to have a choice in their marriages and to have the right to divorce. She wrote these rights into the Republic of China's Civil Code in the early 1930s. She was one of the influences who inspired Phan Bội Châu's development of women's rights in Vietnam.

Zheng's nephew Paifong Robert Cheng attended the Sorbonne under the guidance of his aunt. He held the diplomatic post of the Chinese Ambassador to Cuba from 1946 to 1950. Cheng's son Ching Ho Cheng was an American contemporary artist whose works are collected by several museums across the U.S.

Her autobiography, My Revolutionary Years (1944), published while her husband was Ambassador to the United States, is a first-hand account of modern Chinese history and has been translated into many languages.

She died of cancer in Los Angeles on December 16, 1959.

== Bibliography ==
- Wei, Yü-hsiu (Chêng) (1920). Souvenirs d'enfance et de révolution (in French). Translated by Van Vorst, John. Paris, Payot & cie.
  - Wei, Yu-hsiu [Cheng] (1943). My Revolutionary Years: The Autobiography of Madame Wei Tao-ming. New York: Scribner's sons.
- Yü-hsiu CHÊNG (1925). Le Mouvement constitutionnel en Chine. Étude de droit comparé, etc (in French).
  - Wei, Yü-hsiu (Cheng) (1927). Zhongguo bi jiao xian fa lun (in Chinese). Shi jie shu ju.
- Wei, Yu-hsiu [Cheng] (1926). A girl from China (Soumay Tcheng). Translated by Van Vorst, Bessie (McGinnis). New York: Frederick A. Stokes company.

== See also ==
- First women lawyers around the world
