= The Korean Wedding Chest =

2009 German documentary film

The Korean Wedding Chest Die koreanische Hochzeitstruhe
- Directed by: Ulrike Ottinger
- Written by: Ulrike Ottinger
- Cinematography: Ulrike Ottinger, Lee Sun-Young
- Edited by: Bettina Blickwede
- Music by: Kim So-Young
- Production company: Ulrike Ottinger Filmproduktion
- Distributed by: Women Make Movies
- Release date: October 1, 2009
- Running time: 82 minutes
- Countries: Germany; South Korea
- Languages: German, Korean

The Korean Wedding Chest is a 2009 documentary film about Korean wedding traditions directed by Ulrike Ottinger. The German language film was described as "capturing the collision of ancient tradition and modern culture on the subject of love and marriage in Korea in a film that echoes the beauty, precision and care of the rituals she examines" by the Los Angeles Times.

== Recognition ==
The Washington Post's website refers to the surrealist style of the film as being well suited to "the regal pacing of the ritual" and calls the film one of Ottinger's most praised works.

== See also ==
- Pyebaek
- Marriage in South Korea
