= Tally Brown =

American actress

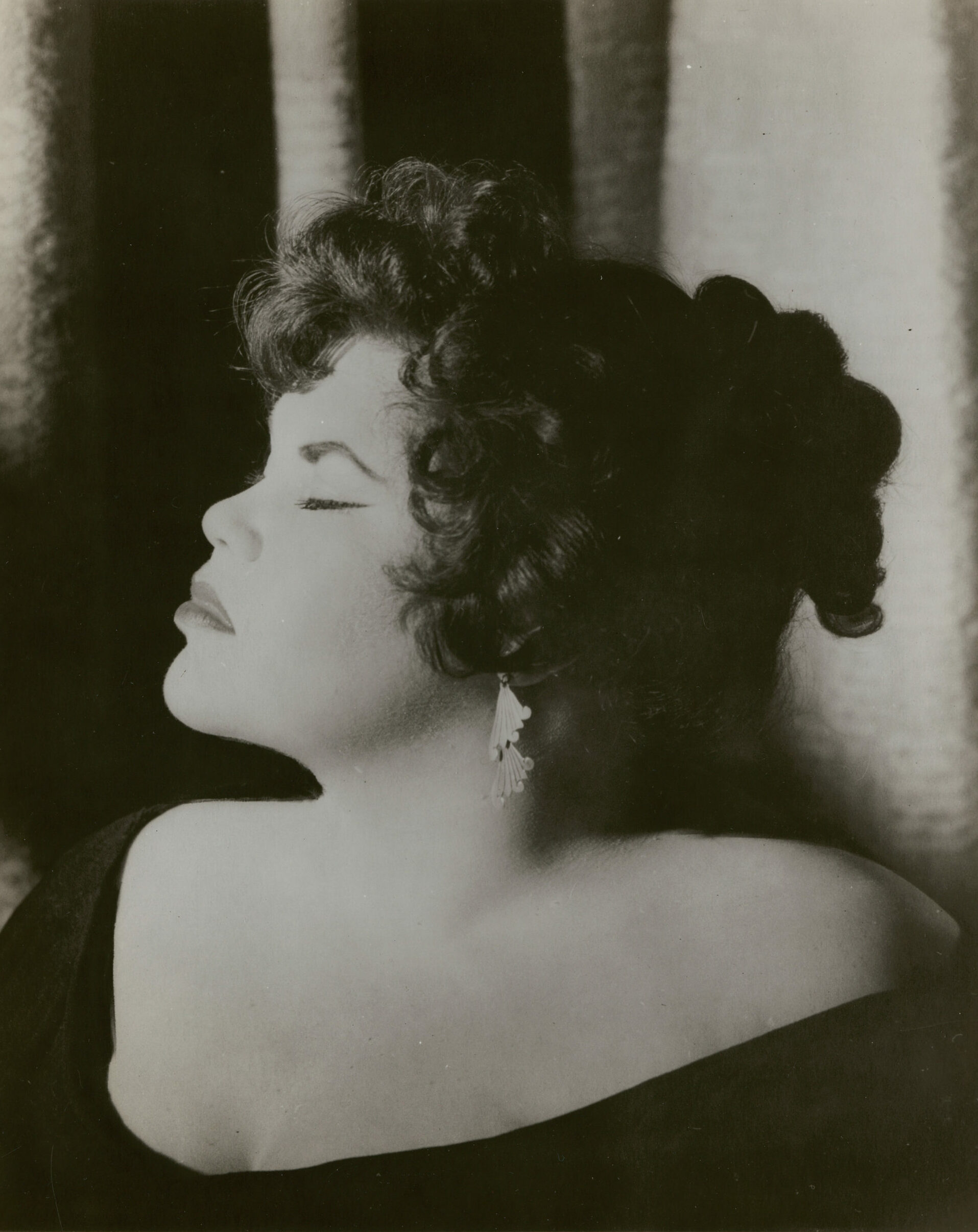
- Brown, c. 1950s
- Born: August 1, 1924; New York City, United States
- Died: May 6, 1989 (aged 64); New York City, United States
- Occupations: Singer, actress

Tally Brown (August 1, 1924 – May 6, 1989) was an American singer and actress who was part of the New York underground performance scene, particularly Andy Warhol's "Factory" and who appeared in or was the subject of films by Andy Warhol and Rosa von Praunheim. She was born and died in New York City.

== Musical and singing career ==
Brown began her classical musical training at Juilliard at the age of sixteen; however, she later took up the genres of jazz and the blues after having met Leonard Bernstein at Tanglewood in 1947.

Brown was an early and active supporter of Ruth W. Greenfield, the founder in 1951 of the Fine Arts Conservatory, in Miami, which The New York Times described as, "one of the first racially integrated theaters and art schools in the South."

By the 1950s, Brown had developed a rhythm-and-blues style akin to such performers as Ma Rainey and Bessie Smith, and during this time, she released an album entitled, A Torch for Tally, with the Jimmy Diamond Quartet. The album featured the songs Limehouse Blues, Honeysuckle Rose, and My Man.

Brown appeared on Broadway and in the California tour of Mame, as well as on Broadway in a production of Medea (starring Irene Papas), as well as off- Broadway.

In the 1960s and 1970s, Brown sang in notable New York City nightclubs such as Reno Sweeney's and S.N.A.F.U. She also provided entertainment at the Continental Baths, a gay bathhouse in New York City. Following her death, The New York Times published an obituary stating that Ms. Brown was known for her intense, dramatic renditions of songs by Kurt Weill, the Rolling Stones and David Bowie."

== Acting career ==
Brown began her film acting career by appearing in the film Batman Dracula (1964) and the film Camp (1965), both directed by Warhol. In one scene from Camp, Brown mimicked Yma Sumac.

Brown appeared in such experimental low-budget films as Brand X (1970) and The Illiac Passion (1964-67). She was also featured in the horror film Silent Night, Bloody Night (1972).

== The New York underground performance scene ==
Brown was "prominent in the underground performance world of the 1960s and 70s." In the summer of 1964, Brown first met Warhol at a benefit for the Living Theatre, the alternative theatre in New York City. Brown would later be featured in at least two of Warhol's films.

In 1970, she was among a panel of guests who participated in a discussion on the David Susskind Show about Warhol's underground film Trash (1970). Also interviewed were other members of Warhol's "Factory".

== Tally Brown, New York ==
German filmmaker Rosa von Praunheim directed a documentary based on the life of Brown entitled Tally Brown, New York in which he relied on "extensive interviews with Brown, as she recounts her collaboration with Warhol, Taylor Mead, and others...." Released in 1979 in the former West Germany, Tally Brown, New York is a portrait of Brown's singing and acting career. The film included cameo appearances by actors Divine, Holly Woodlawn and artist Ching Ho Cheng. At the time, Brown was a resident of Washington Heights, Manhattan.

In the same year of its release, the documentary won the Film Award in Silver at the German Film Awards for "Outstanding Non-Feature Film'. The documentary was also noteworthy for its use of cinéma vérité in its opening shot by depicting New York's gritty street life in and around Times Square in the 1970s, before it was later cleaned up.

Tally Brown's biographical papers and artifacts are archived at the Andy Warhol Museum in Pittsburgh, Pa. Tally Brown has been featured in her own exhibition at The Andy Warhol Museum.

== Filmography ==
- Batman Dracula (1964) directed by Andy Warhol
- Camp (1965) directed by Warhol
- Four Stars**** (1967) directed by Warhol
- The Illiac Passion (1967) as Venus; directed by Gregory Markopoulos
- Brand X (1970) as Talk Show Hostess
- The Owl and the Pussycat (1970) directed by Herbert Ross
- Scarecrow in a Garden of Cucumbers (1972) as Mary Poppins
- Leidenschaften (1972) as Herself
- 1 Berlin-Harlem (1974)
- Silent Night, Bloody Night (1972) as Inmate
- The Art of Crime (1975) (TV) as Cedie
- Now or Never (1979) as Herself
- Night of the Juggler (1980) as Peep Show Owner
- Tally Brown, New York (1979) as Herself
- Mein New York (1982) (TV) as Herself

== Trivia ==
- Brown shared billing on "Silent Night, Bloody Night" with many actors from Warhol's "Factory" years: Mary Woronov, Ondine, Candy Darling, director Jack Smith, and artist Susan Rothenberg.
