= Night Owl (film) =

- Directed by: Jeffrey Arsenault
- Written by: Jeffrey Arsenault
- Produced by: Jeffrey Arsenault
- Starring: John Leguizamo; James Raftery; Lisa Napoli; David Roya
- Cinematography: Pierre Clavel; Howard Krupa; Neil Shapiro
- Edited by: Jeffrey Arsenault
- Music by: Rubio Hernandez; Mark Styles
- Release date: June 30, 1993
- Running time: 77 min.
- Country: United States
- Language: English

Night Owl is a 1993 American vampire film directed, written and produced by Jeffrey Arsenault, starring John Leguizamo and James Raftery.

== Plot ==
Jake is a brooding vampire and squatter who frequents nightclubs to pick up women. During their encounters, he slashes their necks with a matte knife and drinks their blood. One evening, he kills Zohra, the sister of Angel, prompting Angel to launch a frantic search for the murderer. Meanwhile, Jake falls in love with Anne Guish, a performance artist, and struggles to resist his cravings for fresh blood. Eventually, Jake and Angel's paths intersect.

== Cast ==
- John Leguizamo as Angel
- James Raftery as Jake
- Ali Thomas as Anne
- David Roya as Dario
- Holly Woodlawn as barfly
- Lisa Napoli as Frances
- Yul Vazquez as Tomas
- Caroline Munro as herself

== Background ==
The film was shot in New York City's Alphabet City, making it the first in a succession of gritty black and white vampire films set in the same area of New York City, followed by Nadja and The Addiction.

== Reception ==
The film had a mixed reception.

== Home media ==
The film was retitled Nite Owl when released on DVD.
