= Juliana Wang =

American cinematographer

- Born: July 10, 1929
- Died: January 3, 1993 (aged 63)
- Occupation: Cinematographer

Juliana Wang (July 10, 1929 - January 3, 1993) was an American cinematographer. She was one of the first members of the National Association of Broadcast Employees and Television in New York and was one of the first female directors of photography in the IA Local 644 union. In 1978, she and colleague Alicia Weber won an Emmy award for cinematography.

== Biography ==
Born to a diplomat, Wang spent most of her childhood in Iran.

Wang was a self-taught cinematographer who says she shot "just for fun" and learned from others' criticism. She began her career by working on animation, including Popeye and Casper the Friendly Ghost cartoons. She later worked regularly for CBS and in the 1960s she shot commercials for FilmFair. She claims to have been the first female director of photography in the IA Local 644 union.

She was nominated for an Emmy award alongside Urs Furrer for her work on "Way Back Home," which aired on WABC on October 14, 1967. In the late 1970s she was involved in three Rosa von Praunheim films as a camerawoman. In 1978, she and Alicia Weber won an Emmy for a New York Illustrated documentary on lesbian mothers, which aired on NBC.

Despite her success in cinematography, Wang spent her later years in poverty, as she struggled to make the transition from shooting film to video. Wang died in Manhattan, New York City on January 3, 1993.

To learn more about her visit: https://www.stillsinmotions.com/julie

== Selected filmography ==
Film	Role in Film	Year of Film
Ida B. Wells : A Passion For Justice	Cinematographer	1989
Bittersweet Survival	Cinematographer	1982
Mein New York	Cinematographer	1982
Tally Brown, New York	Cinematographer	1979
Army of Lovers or Revolt of the Perverts	Cinematographer	1979
Out to Lunch	Cinematographer	1977
Year of the Woman	Cinematographer	1973
High Priestess of Sexual Witchcraft	Cinematographer (uncredited)	1973
FTA	Cinematographer	1972
The Premier of 'Finian's Rainbow'	Cinematographer	1968
The Taming	Cinematographer	1968
Man Who Dances: Edward Villella	Cinematographer	1968
Jazz: The Intimate Art	Cinematographer	1968
