= Ticket of No Return =

- German: Bildnis einer Trinkerin
- Directed by: Ulrike Ottinger
- Written by: Ulrike Ottinger
- Produced by: Tabea Blumenschein; Ulrike Ottinger
- Starring: Tabea Blumenschein; Magdalena Montezuma; Orpha Termin; Monika von Cube
- Cinematography: Ulrike Ottinger
- Edited by: Ila von Hasperg
- Music by: Peer Raben
- Production companies: Autorenfilm-Produktionsgemeinschaft; Zweites Deutsches Fernsehen
- Release date: October 27, 1979 (Hof International Film Festival)
- Running time: 107 minutes
- Country: West Germany
- Language: German

Ticket of No Return (German: Bildnis einer Trinkerin) is a West German drama film, directed by Ulrike Ottinger and released in 1979. The film is considered to be the first of Ottinger's "Berlin Trilogy", alongside the later films Freak Orlando and Dorian Gray in the Mirror of the Yellow Press.

The film stars Tabea Blumenschein, Magdalena Montezuma, Orpha Termin, Monika von Cube, Kurt Raab, Volker Spengler, Günter Meisner and Eddie Constantine.

== Synopsis ==
The film is an exploration of the way women's public behavior is more heavily scrutinized than men's. Sie travels to West Berlin with plans to do nothing but drink herself to oblivion on alcohol as a Greek chorus of sociologists named: "Social Question", "Accurate Statistics" and "Common Sense", spout facts, questions, and moral judgements about her actions.

Whenever Sie drinks she is regarded as a pest, something everyone wants to get rid of, and business owners repeatedly deal with her drunken behavior by kicking her out of their establishments. Although the three sociologists constantly recite facts and figures about alcoholics and drinking behaviors, they never intervene to change the situation.

Over the course of the drinking spree she also develops a quasi-romantic relationship with a homeless woman, and drinks in a wide variety of venues including a casino bar and a lesbian bar. At the end of the film, Sie is seen collapsed at the train station, and as the sociologists walk by her, one of them says to her: 'As you make your bed, so you must lie on it'.

== Cast ==
- Tabea Blumenschein as She (Sie)
- Magdalena Montezuma as Social Question
- Orpha Termin as Exact Statistics
- Monika von Cube as Common Sense
- Kurt Raab as the protagonists' boss
- Volker Spengler as the Transvestite
- Günter Meisner as Director Willi
- Eddie Constantine
- Wolf Vostell
- Martin Kippenberger
- Nina Hagen as the Singer
- Christine Lutze as the homeless woman the protagonist befriends
- Paul Glauer as the Dwarf
- Ginka Steinwachs
- Mercedes Vostell
- Raul Gimenez

== Release ==
In 2020, the film was selected for screening in the online We Are One: A Global Film Festival.

== Reception ==
American film critic Richard Brody wrote "there's a crucially feminist tone and import to the movie’s higher loopiness; Ottinger's leaps of absurdity express the tangle of confusion into which women are driven and their pent-up defiance of a repressively rational order – a venting of smiling rage at the idea that anyone should find women's emancipation, or, simply, equality, anything other than self-evident."

Lorry Kikta of Film Threat opined that "the set pieces are what make the movie since the plot gets thrown out the window pretty early on; not a lot of directors can make a film such as this that isn't total garbage; there is so much beauty in the hideous in the film; I also can't fail to mention that the costumes, particularly Sie's and the sociologists, are otherworldly amalgamations of high fashion and camp."

Laura Pierce from Gay Community News commented that "Ottinger exploits and pushes to its limit the cinematic concept of spectacle; unlike the heroines of Hollywood who are trapped into being objects of the male gaze, Ottinger's Drinker indulges in narcissism, thus becoming an object of her own pleasure rather than that of the male spectator; the woman's clear lack of regard for others continues throughout the film, as we follow her on a senseless, meandering search throughout Berlin for the next drink."

== See also ==
- Cinema of Germany
- Films about alcoholism
- List of films set in Berlin
- List of German films of the 1970s
- List of LGBTQ-related films of 1979
