= Taiga (1992 film) =

- Directed by: Ulrike Ottinger
- Written by: Ulrike Ottinger
- Cinematography: Ulrike Ottinger
- Release date: 21 February 1992 (Berlin)
- Running time: 501 min.

Taiga (1992) is an eight-hour ethnographic film directed and photographed by Ulrike Ottinger.

It focuses on the life and rituals of nomadic peoples in Northern Mongolia, specifically the Darkhad nomads and the Soyon Uriankhai.

== Chapters ==
It is divided into 38 stations:

1. Der Oul-Paß mit Obo-Heiligtum - Wächter zum Darkhad-Tal (English: The Oul Pass with holy Obo relic – Guards of the Darkhad Valley)
2. Das Tal der Darkhad-Nomaden (The valley of the Darkhad Nomads)
3. Nomaden am Altrag-Fluß (Nomads along the Altrag River)
4. Im einsamen Höjen-Tal lebt die Schamanin Baldshir (The shamaness Baldshir lives alone in the Höjen Valley)
5. Die schamanistische Seance beginnt um Mitternacht
6. Bei Jura - Die Hochzeit (With the Yura – the wedding)
7. Bei Jura - Die weißen Speisen (With the Yura – the white food)
8. Juras Nachbarn - Der Sänger und Schmied Dawadschi (The Jura's neighbors – The singer and smith Dawadschi)
9. Heiliger Baum (Sacred tree)
10. Suren Hör erzählt das Märchen vom nackten Jungen im Erdloch (Suren Hor narrates the fairty tale of the naked boy in the hole in the ground)
11. Der Jäger und Stiefelmacher Ölziibajar (The hunter and boot maker Ölziibajar)
12. Das Öwtschuunii-Naadam - Fest des Hammelbrustknochens (The Öwtschuunii-Naadam – Festival of the sheep breast bone)
13. Ringer und Lobpreissänger (Wrestlers and Singers of Praise)
14. Aufbruch der Nomaden ins Winterlager (The nomads prepare to move to their winter camp)
15. Unterwegs nach Tsagaan Nor (Weißer See) (On the way to Tsagaan Nor (white sea))
16. Der Jäger Tscholoo (The hunter Tscholoo)
17. Tsagaan Nor City
18. Held der Arbeit (Hero of work)
19. Holzfäller Sanji (Tree cutter Sanji)
20. Örgöl-Heiligtum (Örgöl reliquary)
21. Wie die Alten Bären jagten (How the old bears hunted)
22. Auf dem Schischgid zu den Rentiernomaden der Taiga (On the Shishgid on the way to the reindeer nomads of the taiga)
23. Großes Tsaatan-Treffen am Tingis (Large Tsaatan meeting on the Tingis)
24. Eine christliche Delegation ist gelandet (A Christian delegation has arrived)
25. Aufbruch ins 5 Tagereisen entfernte Herbstlager (Departure for the autumn camp, 5-days-trip away)
26. Reise zur südlichen Taiga (Trip to the southern taiga)
27. Die Schamanin Bajar und ihre Familie (The shamaness Bajar and her family)
28. Zurück bei Jura - Vorbereitungen fürs Winterlager (Back with the Jura – preparations for the winter camp)
29. Juras Umzug ins Winterlager nach Ulaan Uul (The Jura's move to winter camp in Ulaan Uul)
30. Juras Nachbarn in Ulaan Uul (The Jura's neighbors in Ulaan Uul)
31. Im Kaufladen sind Mehl und Teeziegel eingetroffen (Flour and tea seals/bricks have arrived at the store)
32. Die Honoratioren von Ulaan Uul geben ein Abschiedsfest (The dignitaries of Ulaan Uul host a farewell party)
33. Nomaden am Oul-Paß (Nomads on the Oul Pass)
34. Erster Schultag in Hadhal (First school day in Hadhal)
35. Von Hadhal nach Hanch, zwei vergessene Handelsmetropolen (From Hadhal to Hanch, two forgotten trading centers)
36. Chöwsgöl Nor - See des Klaren Wassers (Chöwsgöl Nor – Lake of Clear Water)
37. Ulaanbaatar - Hochzeitspalast (Ulaanbaatar – marriage palace)
38. Vergnügungspark - Epensänger (Amusement park – epic singers)

== See also ==
- List of longest films by running time
