= Taxi nach Kairo =

- Directed by: Frank Ripploh
- Written by: Frank Ripploh; Tamara Kafka
- Produced by: Frank Ripploh
- Starring: Frank Ripploh; Nina Schuehly
- Cinematography: Dodo Simoncic
- Edited by: Peter R. Adam
- Music by: Peter Breiner
- Release date: 1987
- Running time: approx. 90 min.
- Country: West Germany
- Language: German

Taxi nach Kairo is a 1987 film written and directed by Frank Ripploh and the sequel to Taxi zum Klo. The title translates to Taxi to Cairo.

== Synopsis ==
The plot centers on a love triangle between Frank; Klara, an actress posing as Frank's wife in order to appease his mother; and their neighbor, Eugen.

== Cast ==
- Frank Ripploh as Frank Ripploh
- Christine Neubauer as Klara
- Udo Schenk as Eugen
- Bernd Broaderup as Bernd Broaderup
- Nina Schuehl
- Domenica Niehoff
- Burkhard Driest
