= Ching Ho Cheng =

American artist

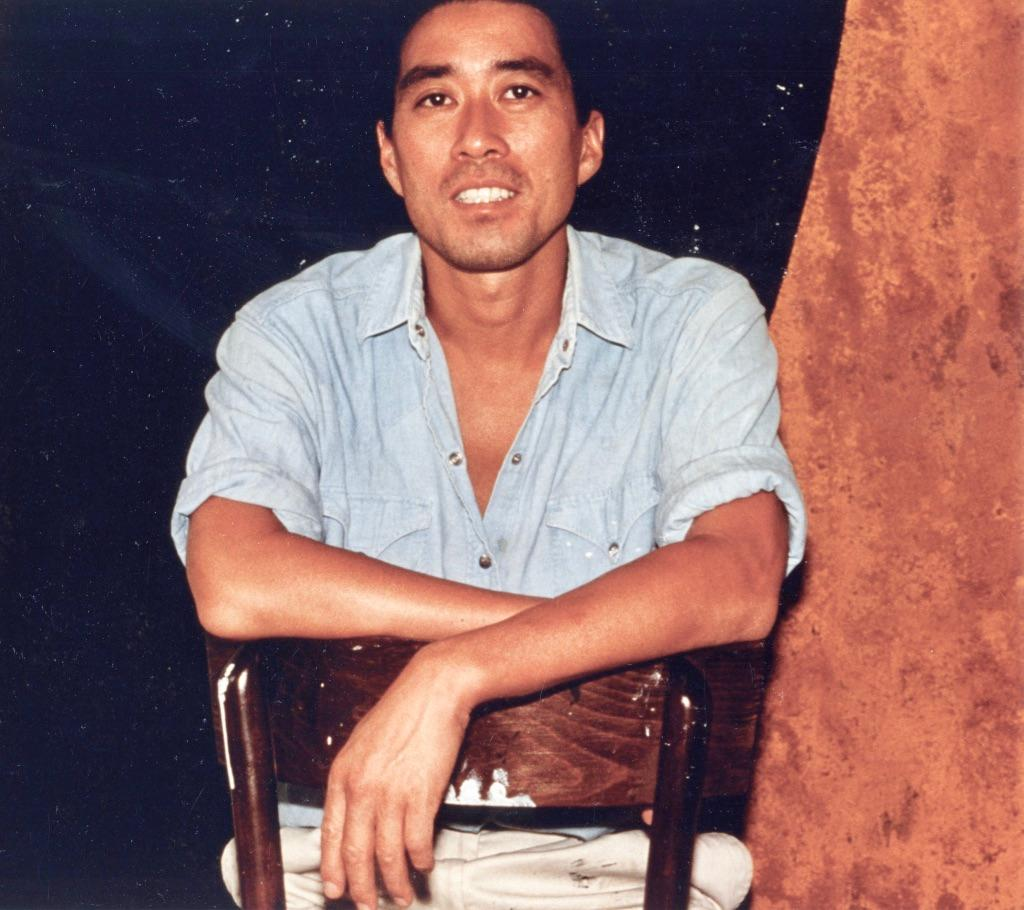
- Born: December 26, 1946; Havana, Cuba
- Died: May 25, 1989 (aged 42); New York, U.S.
- Education: Cooper Union for the Advancement of Science and Art
- Relatives: Paifong Robert Cheng (father) Rosita Yu-fan Cheng (mother) Sybao Cheng-Wilson (sister) Tcheng Yu-hsiu (great aunt)
- Awards: Pollock-Krasner Foundation Grant 1985, Artists Space/Committee of Visual Artist Grant 1984
- Website: chinghocheng.com

Ching Ho Cheng (December 26, 1946 – May 25, 1989) was a Cuban-born American visual artist of Chinese descent whose work occupies a distinct place within the cultural and aesthetic landscape of postwar New York. Active from the late 1960s through the 1980s, Cheng developed a materially innovative and conceptually introspective practice that intersected with the downtown avant-garde, psychedelic art, and emergent Asian American artistic expression. His work is categorized into four distinct periods: Psychedelics, Gouache, Torn Works, and The Alchemical Series—each primarily executed on paper.

== Early life and education ==
Cheng was born on December 26, 1946, in Havana, Cuba, to a family engaged in diplomatic and creative professions. His father, Paifong Robert Cheng, served as a representative of the Republic of China in Havana, while his mother, Rosita Yufan Cheng, worked as a fashion designer.

During the mid-1960s he studied painting at the Cooper Union School of Art in New York City where he received a BFA in 1968, and during the early seventies lived in Paris and Amsterdam, where, in 1976, he had his first one-man show.

Cheng returned to New York that same year and checked into the Chelsea Hotel intending to remain for two months; he lived and worked there until his death in May 1989. Rosa von Praunheim portrayed Cheng in his studio in the Chelsea Hotel for his award-winning film Tally Brown, New York (1979).

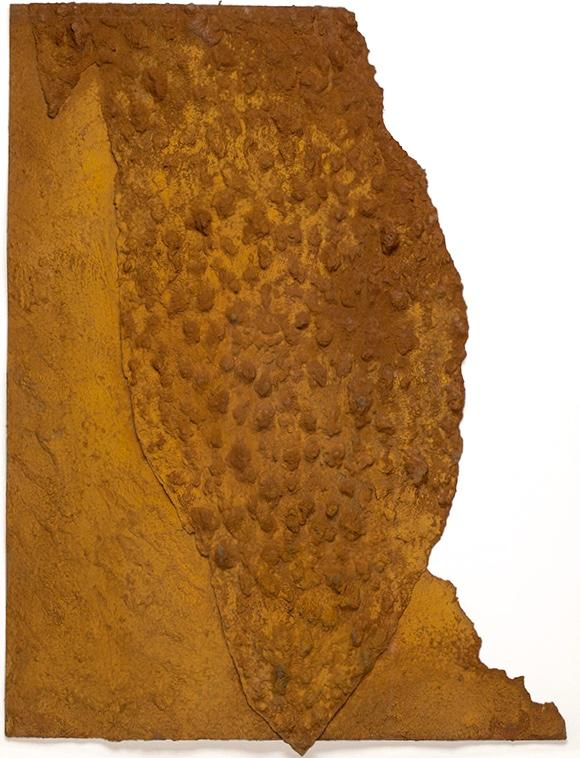
Untitled, 1987. Alchemical Works, Torso Series. Iron oxide on paper. 42 1/2 X 34 1/4" Detroit Institute of Arts.

== Career ==
By the 1970s, Cheng began developing the approaches for which he is now most recognized: layered works on paper in which tearing, cutting, and painted gradients generate complex spatial and luminous effects. These "torn paper" and subsequent "painted light series" synthesize rigorous formal control with a heightened sensitivity to color, shadow, and negative space, producing compositions that various critics have linked to both Eastern landscape traditions and Western modernist abstraction.

Ching Ho Cheng created artwork from torn paper. To create these variously scaled abstract pieces, Cheng applied iron powder to torn paper which was sealed with waterproof layers of gesso, mat medium and modeling paste employed to create a sense of relief. He used a special catalyst to begin a lengthy chemical process of transforming the iron into rust. The paper was soaked in water for days and dried, acquiring a hard surface. Cheng controlled the process by deciding when to remove the paper from the bath. Cheng would sometimes re-soak the paper in order to obtain the desired surface and textural coloration. He manipulated viscous surfaces with the smaller works and hoped to achieve a greater impasto with the larger torn paper pieces, as these pieces had a tendency to break if too heavily laden.

At a time when Asian-Americans were nearly absent from the contemporary art scene, Cheng was highly regarded by peers and by prominent art historians such as Gert Schiff and Henry Geldzahler, the first curator of twentieth-century art at the Metropolitan Museum of Art. Notable collectors of his work are Miles Davis, Louise Fletcher, Aldo Cipullo, Princess Caroline of Monaco, Alfonso Ossorio, Peggy Cooper Cafritz, Countess Claude de Lesse and others. Cheng exhibited his work extensively in New York and overseas.

== Notable collectors ==
Henry Geldzahler, Gert Schiff, Miles Davis, Louise Fletcher, Aldo Cipullo, Princess Caroline of Monaco, Alfonso Ossorio, Peggy Cooper Cafritz, Countess Claude de Lesse and others.

== Archives ==
Ching Ho Cheng's personal letters, photos, drawings and artifacts are housed at the Smithsonian Archives of American Art in Washington, DC.

== Selected collections ==
- Whitney Museum of American Art
- Hirshhorn Museum and Sculpture Garden
- Cleveland Museum of Art
- The Phillips Collection
- Smithsonian American Art Museum
- Brooklyn Museum
- Montclair Art Museum
- Los Angeles County Museum of Art
- Detroit Institute of Arts
- Minneapolis Institute of Art
- Grey Art Museum
- Everson Museum of Art
- Smith College Museum of Art
