= Holly Woodlawn =

American actress (1946–2015)

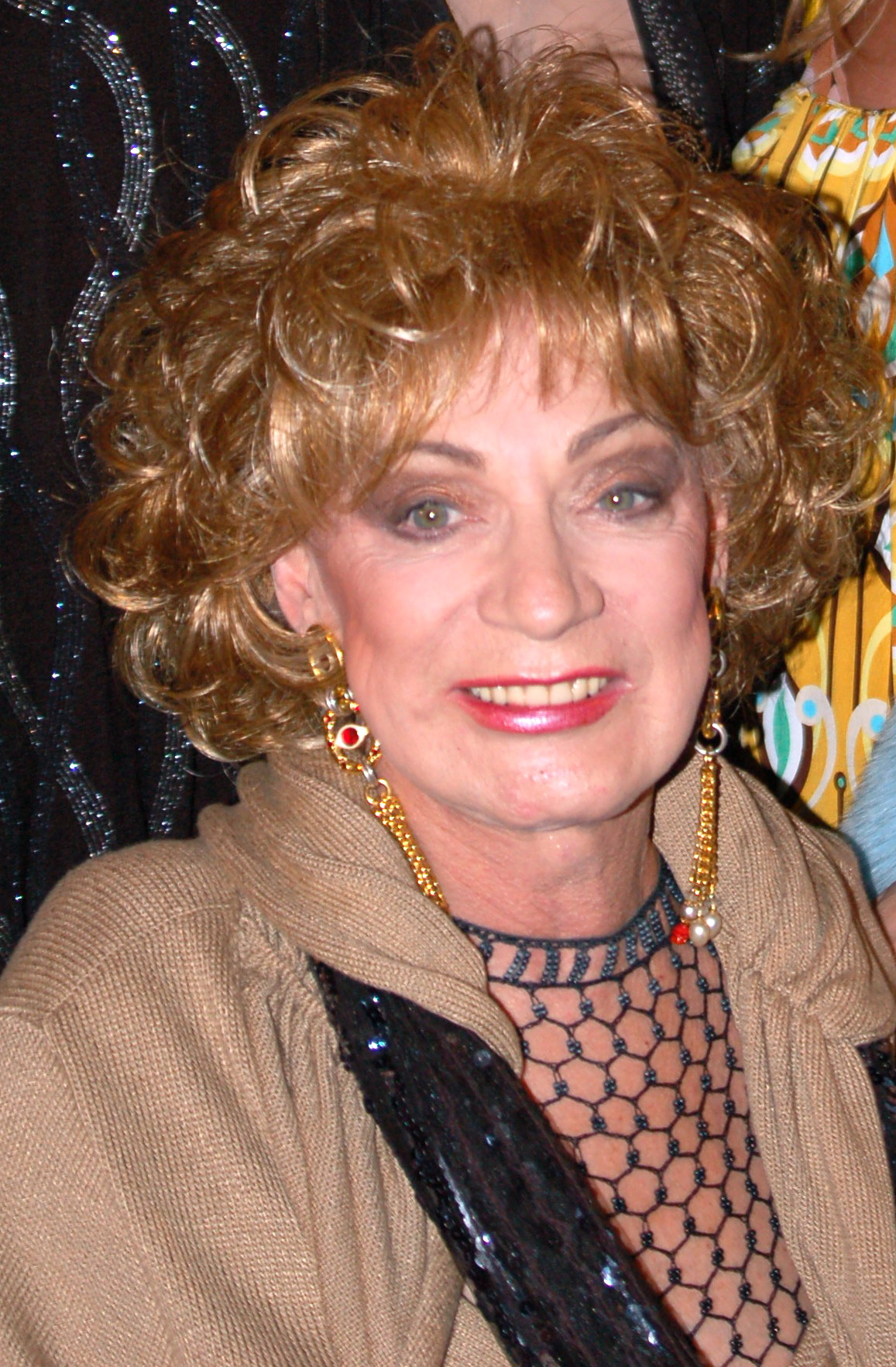
- Woodlawn in 2007
- Born: Haroldo Santiago Franceschi Rodriguez Danhakl; October 26, 1946; Juana Díaz, Puerto Rico
- Died: December 6, 2015 (aged 69); Los Angeles, California, U.S.
- Resting place: Hollywood Forever Cemetery
- Other name: Harold Ajzenberg
- Occupation: Actress

Holly Woodlawn (born Haroldo Santiago Franceschi Rodriguez Danhakl; October 26, 1946 – December 6, 2015) was an American actress. Best known as a Warhol superstar, she appeared in the films Trash (1970) and Women in Revolt (1971). Her career extended to cabaret, and she was among those named in Lou Reed's 1972 hit song "Walk on the Wild Side". Woodlawn published the memoir A Low Life in High Heels in 1991.

== Early life ==
Holly Woodlawn was born Haroldo Santiago Franceschi Rodriguez Danhakl on October 26, 1946 in Juana Díaz, Puerto Rico. Woodlawn's father was a German-American who was a soldier in the U.S. Army, and Woodlawn's mother was Puerto Rican. Woodlawn's mother moved to New York for work. While there, she met and married Joseph Ajzenberg when they were both working as wait staff at a Catskills resort. The family moved to Miami Beach, where Woodlawn's name was changed to Harold Ajzenberg.

Woodlawn later said that she "came out very young... I was having sex when I was seven and eight in the bushes with my uncles and cousins - of course, they were only 11 or 12 themselves... Then Miami Beach. All the Cubans arrived after Castro took over, and that's where I really came out, on 21st Street in Miami Beach".

Woodlawn has stated that in Miami Beach, she "was going to school, getting stones thrown at me and being beaten up by homophobic rednecks". In 1962, aged 15 or 16, Woodlawn ran away from home, heading north from Florida to New York City with some "Cuban queens". Woodlawn has said that she left home with only $27 and began hitchhiking. As Lou Reed stated in his 1972 song "Walk on the Wild Side", Woodlawn plucked her eyebrows while on her journey to New York City. She adopted the name Holly from Holly Golightly, the heroine of Breakfast at Tiffany's. In her memoir, A Low Life in High Heels, she said: "At the age of 16, when most kids were cramming for trigonometry exams, I was turning tricks, living off the streets and wondering when my next meal was coming. But what bothered me the most was that I gave up the senior prom for this kind of life."

Upon arriving in New York City, she "'met this guy who fell in love with me and asked me to be his girlfriend. I started taking hormones for a sex-change and lived as his wife, working in the days as a clothing model at Saks Fifth Avenue... And for six or seven years they never knew I was a boy. Not a clue!'" By 1969, she had decided against sex reassignment surgery.

== Career ==
=== Acting career ===
Woodlawn became known after appearing in two films by Andy Warhol.

According to Woodlawn, Warhol superstar Ondine arranged for her to get invited to Andy Warhol's Factory party for Flesh (1968). Her friend Silver George introduced her to Warhol at the party, and Warhol told her she was "so glamorous" and that she ought to be in one of his films. Warhol asked for her last name, but she didn't have one because she hadn't come up with Woodlawn yet and just went by Holly. Nothing came of this encounter, and she became envious, wanting to be a part of the Factory scene after witnessing how the film launched the careers of transgender Warhol superstars Candy Darling and Jackie Curtis. During the summer of 1969, her friend Peter came up with the surname Woodlawn:

As fate would have it, the TV was on and Peter was watching a rerun of "I Love Lucy." It was the episode where Lucy is riding the subway with a loving cup stuck on her head. Well, in the subway background was the word "Woodlawn," since Lucy was supposed to be riding the Woodlawn train — which, incidentally, was the train that traveled to the Bronx and made its last stop at the Woodlawn Cemetery. Peter spotted the word and his hair curled, his eyes popped, and his finger pointed as he up and shouted, "That's it! The Woodlawn Cemetery!"

In September 1969, Woodlawn made her stage debut as Cuckoo the Bird Girl, who was featured in the chorus as a Moon Reindeer Girl, in Jackie Curtis' play Heaven Grand in Amber Orbit.

Around this time, Woodlawn attempted to impersonate Warhol superstar Viva and charge a camera to Warhol's account at a store. Word got around Max's Kansas City that director Paul Morrissey was shooting a Warhol film. Woodlawn gave an interview on what it was like being a Warhol superstar, although she was not associated with the Factory. Her audacity intrigued Morrissey, who showed Warhol the article. When Warhol realized she was the perpetrator from the camera heist, he wanted nothing to do with her. However, Morrissey still reached out to her and offered her a role in Trash, which was filmed in October 1969. In the film, Warhol superstar Joe Dallesandro plays a heroin addict on a quest to score who, ambivalent about his sexuality, has a transgender girlfriend played by Woodlawn. Woodlawn was paid $25 per day during filming, spending the last day on heroin.

Trash was released in October 1970 to positive reviews. Vincent Canby of The New York Times wrote: "Holly Woodlawn, especially, is something to behold, a comic book Mother Courage who fancies herself as Marlene Dietrich but sounds more often like Phil Silvers." Her performance prompted director George Cukor to campaign for the Academy of Motion Picture Arts and Sciences to nominate Woodlawn for an Academy Award, but nothing came of this.

In 1971, Woodlawn replaced Candy Darling at the La MaMa theatre in a production of Vain Victory, which was written and directed by Jackie Curtis.

In Morrissey's next film, Woodlawn starred in Women in Revolt (1972), a satirical look at the women's rights movement and the PIGS (politically involved girls). In this film, she became one of the first people to say the word cunt in cinema. Photographer Richard Avedon captured Woodlawn with her co-stars Jackie Curtis and Candy Darling for the June 1972 issue of Vogue. The film also featured Woodlawn's longtime friend Penny Arcade in a small role. The pair had first met in Manhattan in 1968, and both were members of the Play-House of the Ridiculous.

Woodlawn became known as a Warhol superstar.

In 1972, director Robert Kaplan and cinematographer Paul Glickman concocted the idea of a movie whose premise would be using a transgender woman as the lead in a film without revealing the sex of the actress. Woodlawn played a young, starstruck girl hoping for success as an actress in New York City in the film, Scarecrow in a Garden of Cucumbers. It was a low budget, 16 mm, unsuccessful musical feature which contains the song "In The Very Last Row" performed by Bette Midler. It was thought to be lost until its 35mm negative was rediscovered when DuArt Film and Video closed their storage facility in 2013, after which it was restored by the Academy Film Archive.

This was followed by Broken Goddess in 1973. Described by J. Hoberman and Jonathan Rosenbaum in Midnight Movies as an "apparently plotless mood piece in which Woodlawn ran and posed through Central Park at dawn". Both Goddess and Cucumbers ran for short stints at midnight at some theaters in New York.

In 1978 she co-starred with Divine in a run of Tom Eyen's The Neon Woman (a burlesque) at Hurrah, directed by Ron Link.

She also appeared in films by Rosa von Praunheim, including Tally Brown, New York (1979). Woodlawn was friends with both the director and Tally Brown.

In 1991, she published her autobiography, A Low Life in High Heels, with writer Jeff Copeland.

During the 1990s, Woodlawn achieved a modest film and theatrical comeback, making cameo appearances in productions such as Night Owl (1993) and Billy's Hollywood Screen Kiss (1998).

In 1999, she was in a controversial film about conjoined twins who live in a run-down motel in a small town, Twin Falls Idaho. It was followed four years later by Milwaukee, Minnesota.

One of her final acting roles was as Vivian in the series Transparent, appearing for some short moments in scenes at the apartment complex that the character of Maura Pfefferman moves into after she comes out as trans.

=== Cabaret career ===
Woodlawn's first cabaret engagement was a solo act in 1973 at Reno Sweeney in New York. The following year, she performed with Jackie Curtis in "Cabaret in the Sky" at the New York Cultural Center.

In 1978 she headlined at Reno Sweeney, in a performance called Cabaret. It was a musical revue in which she sang popular songs and jazz standards, along with "campy, improvised interludes".

In the mid-1980s, she became a featured singer in Gabriel Rotello's Downtown Dukes and Divas revues at clubs such as The Limelight and The Palladium, and a star of various musicals and revues mounted by the songwriting and producing team of Scott Wittman and Marc Shaiman.

In the late 1990s, she participated in riot grrrl shows with Revolution Rising in West Hollywood, and recorded spoken words for songs with experimental recordings by the band Lucid Nation.

In the early 2000s, she resumed performing cabaret in sold-out shows in New York and Los Angeles. She continued to travel with her cabaret show, including appearing in Manhattan's Laurie Beechman Theatre in 2013.

== Personal life ==
Woodlawn was transgender.

Woodlawn was arrested and briefly incarcerated in Puerto Rico after being caught shoplifting. In 1970, she created a stir when she was arrested in New York City after impersonating the wife of the French Ambassador to the United Nations. When arrested, she was taken to the New York Women's House of Detention and then transferred to a men's facility when authorities discovered she was transgender.

In 1977, Woodlawn moved to San Francisco. She returned to New York later in the year, appearing on Geraldo Rivera's talk show, before being jailed again in 1978 for violating terms of probation. She was released on the appeal of politician Ethan Geto, who helped organize a benefit for her. By 1979, she had surrendered to a faltering career, cut her hair, and moved back to her parents' home in Miami. She worked as a busser at Benihana. Woodlawn returned to New York City in the 1980s and then relocated to Los Angeles.

=== Illness and death ===
Woodlawn fell seriously ill in June 2015 and was hospitalized at Cedars-Sinai Medical Center in Los Angeles, California. Tests later revealed that she had lesions on her liver and brain. The lesions were later determined to be cancer. Woodlawn's health improved enough for her to be sent home, where she continued treatment and received in-home healthcare. She was later forced to vacate her West Hollywood, California, apartment due to flooding and entered an assisted living facility in October.

Woodlawn died of brain and liver cancer in Los Angeles on December 6, 2015.

Woodlawn was included during the In-Memoriam segment at the 88th Academy Awards.

== Legacy ==
Lou Reed referred to Woodlawn in his 1972 song "Walk on the Wild Side", the opening verse of which describes her hitchhiking journey and gender transition.

British singer Holly Johnson took on the name Holly at fourteen years old, inspired by Woodlawn.

In 2016, Woodlawn's estate founded the Holly Woodlawn Memorial Fund for Transgender Youth at the Los Angeles LGBT Center.

Jeff Copeland, Woodlawn's friend and co-author of A Low Life in High Heels, wrote about their life together in his memoir, "Love You Madly, Holly Woodlawn," which was published by Feral House in 2025.

== Filmography ==
Film
Year	Film	Role	Notes
1970	Trash	Holly	a.k.a.
1971	Women In Revolt	Holly	
1971	Is There Sex After Death?	Herself	
1972	Scarecrow in a Garden of Cucumbers	Eve Harrington / Rhett Butler	
1973	Broken Goddess		
1979	Tally Brown, New York	Herself	
1993	Night Owl	Barfly	
1993	Madonna: Deeper and Deeper Music Video	Herself	
1995	The Matinee Idol	Party Guest	
1995	Scathed	Miss Antonia Curtis	
1996	Phantom Pain		
1998	Billy's Hollywood Screen Kiss		
1998	Beverly Hills Hustlers		
1999	Twin Falls Idaho	Flamboyant at Party	
1999	Citizens of Perpetual Indulgence	Uncredited	
2002	The Cockettes	Herself	Documentary
2003	Milwaukee, Minnesota	Transvestite	
2004	Superstar in a Housedress	Herself	Documentary
2006	Jack Smith and the Destruction of Atlantis	Herself	Documentary
2006	Andy Warhol: A Documentary Film	Herself	Documentary
2007	Alibi	Gracie	
2009	Heaven Wants Out		
2010	Beautiful Darling	Herself	Documentary
2010	The Lie	Cherry	
2011	The Ghosts of Los Angeles	Holly	Short
2012	She Gone Rogue	Aunt Holly	Short
2013	Continental	Herself	Documentary
2013	I Am Divine	Herself	Documentary
2013	East of the Tar Pits	Mattie	a.k.a. "Gary LeGault's East of the Tar Pits"
Television
Year	Title	Role	Notes
1971	An American Family	Herself	1 episode
2015	Transparent	Herself	2 episodes

== Sources ==
- Woodlawn, Holly (1991). The Holly Woodlawn Story: A Low Life in High Heels. With Jeff Copeland. St. Martin's Press. ISBN 978-0-312-06429-7.
