= Freak Orlando =

1981 film

- Film poster
- Directed by: Ulrike Ottinger
- Written by: Ulrike Ottinger
- Based on: Orlando: A Biography by Virginia Woolf
- Produced by: Renée Gundelach; Sibylle Hubatschek-Rahn
- Starring: Magdalena Montezuma
- Cinematography: Ulrike Ottinger
- Edited by: Dörte Völz-Mammarella
- Release date: 6 November 1981
- Running time: 126 minutes
- Country: West Germany
- Language: German

Freak Orlando is a 1981 West German comedy film directed by Ulrike Ottinger and starring Magdalena Montezuma. It is based on Virginia Woolf's 1928 novel Orlando: A Biography.

== Plot ==
The film is divided into five acts in which the main character Orlando, with different genders and hardly aging himself, experiences various eras from the Baroque period to the present day.

In the first act, Orlando is a nobleman in his twenties at the court of King James I of England; in the second, he is an ambassador to Constantinople on behalf of King James II of England; in the third, Orlando returns to 18th-century England as a woman and marries a naval officer there in the 19th century. In the 20th century, Orlando, now around 40 years old, leads a life similar to Woolf as an emancipated intellectual and poet.

The film ends with a "Festival of the Ugly", where lame people dance and dwarfs make faces before a jury and accompanied by four dancing Playboy "bunnies". A seemingly bourgeois pharmaceutical salesman is ultimately crowned the winner.

== Cast ==
- Magdalena Montezuma – Orlando, as Pilger, Orlando Zyldopa, Orlando Orlanda, Orlando Capricho
- Hans Langerschlanger – Muntzy Pimplips
- Delphine Seyrig – Helena Müller, as Tree of Life Goddess, Department Store Singer, Mother of Miraculous Birth
- Albert Heins – Herbert Zeus
- Claudio Pantoja – Two dancers
- Hiro Uchiyama – Two dancers (credited as Hiro Uschiyama)
- Galli – Chronistin
- Eddie Constantine – Spirit Healer
- Else Nabu – Holy Wilgefortis
- Maria Bucholt – Little People
- Paul Glauer – Little People
- Alfred Raupach – Little People
- Luzig Raupach – Little People
- Monika Ullemeyer – Little People (as Monika Ullemayer)
- Dirk Zalm – Little People
- Luc Alexander – Twelve Leather Boys
