= Taxi zum Klo =

- DVD Cover
- Directed by: Frank Ripploh
- Written by: Frank Ripploh
- Starring: Frank Ripploh; Bernd Broaderup
- Cinematography: Horst Schier
- Edited by: Gela-Marina Runne; Matthias von Gunten
- Music by: Hans Wittstatt
- Distributed by: Promovision International (USA)
- Release date: November 1, 1980
- Running time: 95 minutes
- Country: West Germany
- Language: German

Taxi zum Klo (Taxi to the Toilet) is a 1980 film written by, directed by, and starring Frank Ripploh. The film is a dark comedy of manners that explores the life of a West Berlin school teacher and the contrasts between his public and private lives. Taxi zum Klo was considered groundbreaking for its subject matter and achieved a cult status among audiences of the time.

Shot on location with many characters appearing as themselves, the film documents gay culture in West Berlin in the brief moment post gay liberation and before the onset of AIDS, around 1980. Ripploh has stated that much of the film was autobiographical. The title refers to the public toilet as a place for casual gay sex.

As it contains a number of sexually explicit scenes, the film was not passed uncut by the British Board of Film Classification until 2011, though it was widely shown in club cinemas.

== Plot ==
Frank (all characters are named after the respective actors), known to his friends as Peggy, is a teacher and Bernd works in the cinema. Bernd prefers a quieter life and wants a farm, while Frank, on the other hand, is looking for adventure, longing and testing his limits. So they live at cross purposes even though they live together and sleep together. His students like Frank, and his colleagues at bowling night, but some gossip about him: “He only has male visitors, Mr. Ripploh.”

Frank is out and about in West Berlin day and night, mostly in his old Karmann. He is addicted to all kinds of men, blondes, skinny guys, bears, leather guys, muscle-guys, and the sexual adventures with them. He finds the guys at the bar, the gay sauna, or wherever he finds them. He even gets the gas station attendant after weeks of flirting and has a wild time with him. He also runs away from the hospital in a taxi to go cruising for half an hour.

His boyfriend Bernd is desperate. He tries everything to get Frank to be faithful. He cooks for him, does his laundry, doesn't have sex with him, but doesn't get what he longs for. At the Berlin drag ball, which Bernd attends as a sailor and Frank as an Arabian dancer in tulle, things escalate between the two. They seem to want to go their separate ways in the future: Bernd as a shepherd in the country and Frank as a city cobra in the feverish city. He comes to his school in costume, straight from the drag ball, and encourages the pupils to pick a challenge, whatever they want. Chaos erupts, and Frank realises his life is at a crossroads: go back to Bernd, commit suicide, or carry on as a single guy.

== Cast ==
- Frank Ripploh as Frank Ripploh
- Bernd Broaderup as Bernd
- Orpha Termin
- Peter Fahrni as Gas station attendant
- Hans-Gerd Mehrtens as the Leather Boy
- Dieter Godde
- Klaus Schnee
- Bernd Kroger
- Markus Voigtlander
- Irmgard Lademacher
- Gregor Becker
- Marguerite Dupont
- Eberhard Freudenthal
- Beate Springer
- Millie Büttner
- Gitta Lederer
- Toller Cranston in a cameo role as himself

== Background ==
Frank Ripploh was a West Berlin secondary school teacher and was still a civil servant on probation during filming. Taxi zum Klo made the openly gay Ripploh, who was disciplined by the school authorities after coming out as gay on the cover of Stern magazine in 1978, famous overnight and became a gay cult film of the pre-AIDS era. He was a big name in the West Berlin scene as performance artist Peggy von Schnottgenberg.

In an interview he later said of his motivation for making this film: "I was not pursuing any political goals, but rather realizing purely private interests: my career as a teacher was ruined. And the film fulfilled a very simple desire for revenge, along the lines of 'I'll get back at you'."

Ripploh claims that it is not a gay film at all: "It is a sad film that expresses the longing for a relationship and its impossibility, despite all the humor… I definitely wanted to confront two dead ends: a bourgeois dead end where someone suffocates in pillows, coffee and cake, and a dead end of pseudo-free gay sexuality where you use drugs to blur boundaries but not eliminate them."

In 1987, Ripploh made a sequel, Taxi nach Kairo, which was less successful with critics and audiences.

=== Explicit depiction of gay sexuality ===
The ironic film, which was also perceived as a comedy by some audiences, is remarkable above all for its openness in its portrayal of gay sexuality, (Note: Ripploh spoke of sexual freedom of being a response to suburban life, with boredom at the other end of the spectrum) which was unmatched then and still is today. There are numerous scenes including gay cruising and encounters including unsimulated sex; erect penises could be seen during sexual acts at glory holes in public toilets.

It is the only non-pornographic film in Germany, Austria and German-speaking Switzerland, approved for audiences aged 16 and over, with a scene in which not only fellatio can be seen, but also ejaculation into the partner's mouth followed by swallowing semen in a long, detailed close-up. In this scene (00:42) the director and lead actor Ripploh can be seen having an orgasm.

Elsewhere (01:15:34) the main actor can be seen practicing a golden shower, a similar scene only seen in the thematically related film Savage Nights (Les nuits Fauves) (1992) by Cyril Collard, which is rated 12+ in France and 18+ in Germany, and in which the main actor and director also plays himself.

In Austria the film was confiscated, on 17 May 1981, during the preparations for the first gay film festival in Vienna (1982), because of same-sex pornography.

Intended for release in clubs, the film was eventually released commercially. For its theatrical release in the UK, the British Board of Film Classification required that the images of erection, penetration and BDSM be reduced, as well as two scenes be removed: one scene of urolagnia and one where a black-and-white public information film is shown, relating to stranger danger. This meant that the film could not even be exhibited in the newly created R18 category. The film was eventually passed as 18 uncut in 2011.

=== Age ratings in other countries ===
Finland : K-18
France : -16
United Kingdom : 18 (cut, 1994)
United Kingdom: 18 (uncut, video re-rating 2005)

=== Director's Cut ===
Before his death, Ripploh was able to complete a director's cut, which was released on DVD in 2002. This is remastered, 16:9 anamorphic widescreen and still mono. As an encore, in addition to all the standards, there is a 23-minute interview with the director about Taxi nach Kairo.

== Critical reception ==
The Village Voice hailed it as "the first masterpiece about the mainstream of male gay life". Taxi zum Klo tied with Beau-père in winning the 1981 Boston Society of Film Critics Award for best foreign language film.

== Controversy in Norfolk, Virginia ==
After a showing of the film at the Naro Expanded Cinema, a revival house in Norfolk, Virginia, police confiscated a print of the film on Oct. 5, 1983. The film's distributor filed a lawsuit and the print was returned. The Naro's operators were charged with a misdemeanor and received a light fine.
