= Frank Ripploh =

German actor, director and author

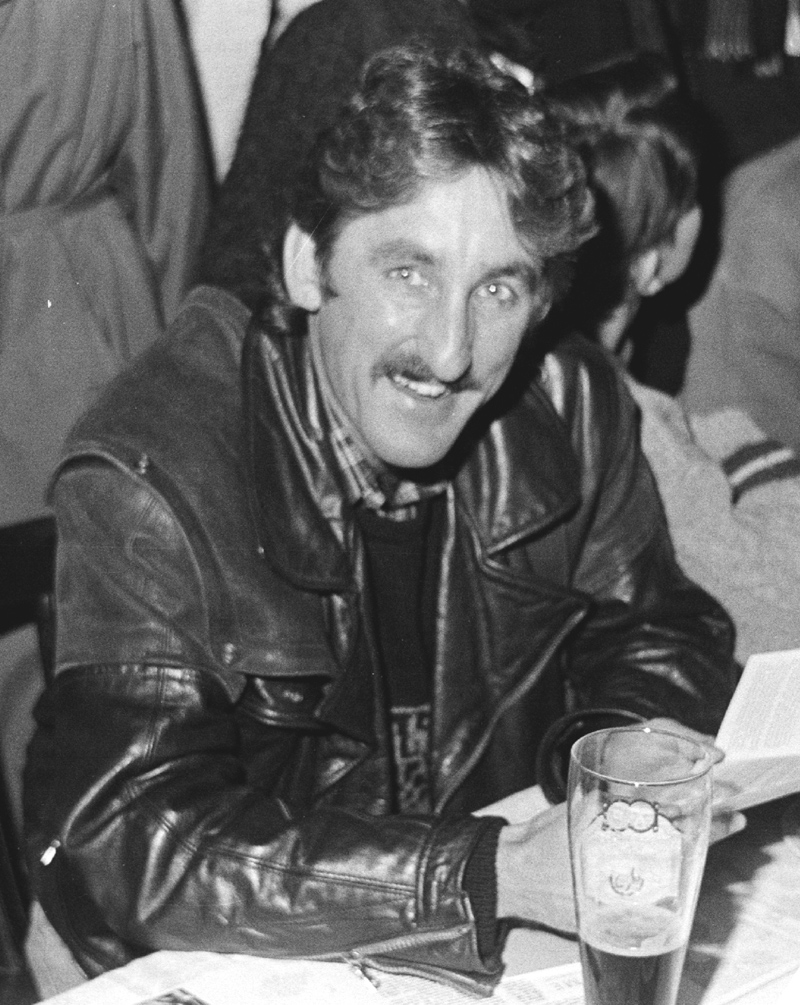
- Ripploh in 1986
- Born: 2 September 1949; Rheine, North Rhine-Westphalia, West Germany (now Rheine, Germany)
- Died: 24 June 2002 (aged 52); Rheine, North Rhine-Westphalia, Germany
- Occupations: Film director, writer, actor
- Notable work: Taxi zum Klo

Frank Ripploh (2 September 1949 – 24 June 2002) was a German actor, film director, and author. He is best remembered for his semi-autobiographical 1980 film Taxi zum Klo. The film, produced on a shoestring budget of 100,000 DM, explored the day-to-day life of a Berlin schoolteacher who also led a very active gay sex life. Extremely explicit for its day, and for some time afterward (to the point where the film was not passed uncut by the British Board of Film Classification until 2011), Taxi zum Klo was considered groundbreaking for the subject matter it portrayed, and achieved something of a cult status among gay audiences of the time. In 1987, Ripploh directed a sequel entitled Taxi nach Kairo, but the film was not considered as successful as its predecessor, and it was not released outside Germany.

Ripploh also participated in the creation of a small number of other art house films during the 1980s, and had a role in the 1982 movie Querelle directed by Rainer Werner Fassbinder. Ripploh died of cancer in 2002.

== Filmography ==
Year	Title	Role	Notes
1974	Axel von Auersperg	Äxel von Auersperg	Television film
1975	Monolog eines Stars	Lehrer	Television film
1975	Die Betörung der blauen Matrosen	Die griechische Gott-Tunte	
1980	Taxi zum Klo	Frank Ripploh	Also director and writer
1982	Kamikaze 1989	Gangster	
1982	Querelle	Bertrunkener Legionär	
1986	Miko: From the Gutter to the Stars	Stefan	
1987	Taxi nach Kairo	Frank Ripploh	Also director and writer
