= Ulrike Ottinger =

German filmmaker and photographer (born 1942)

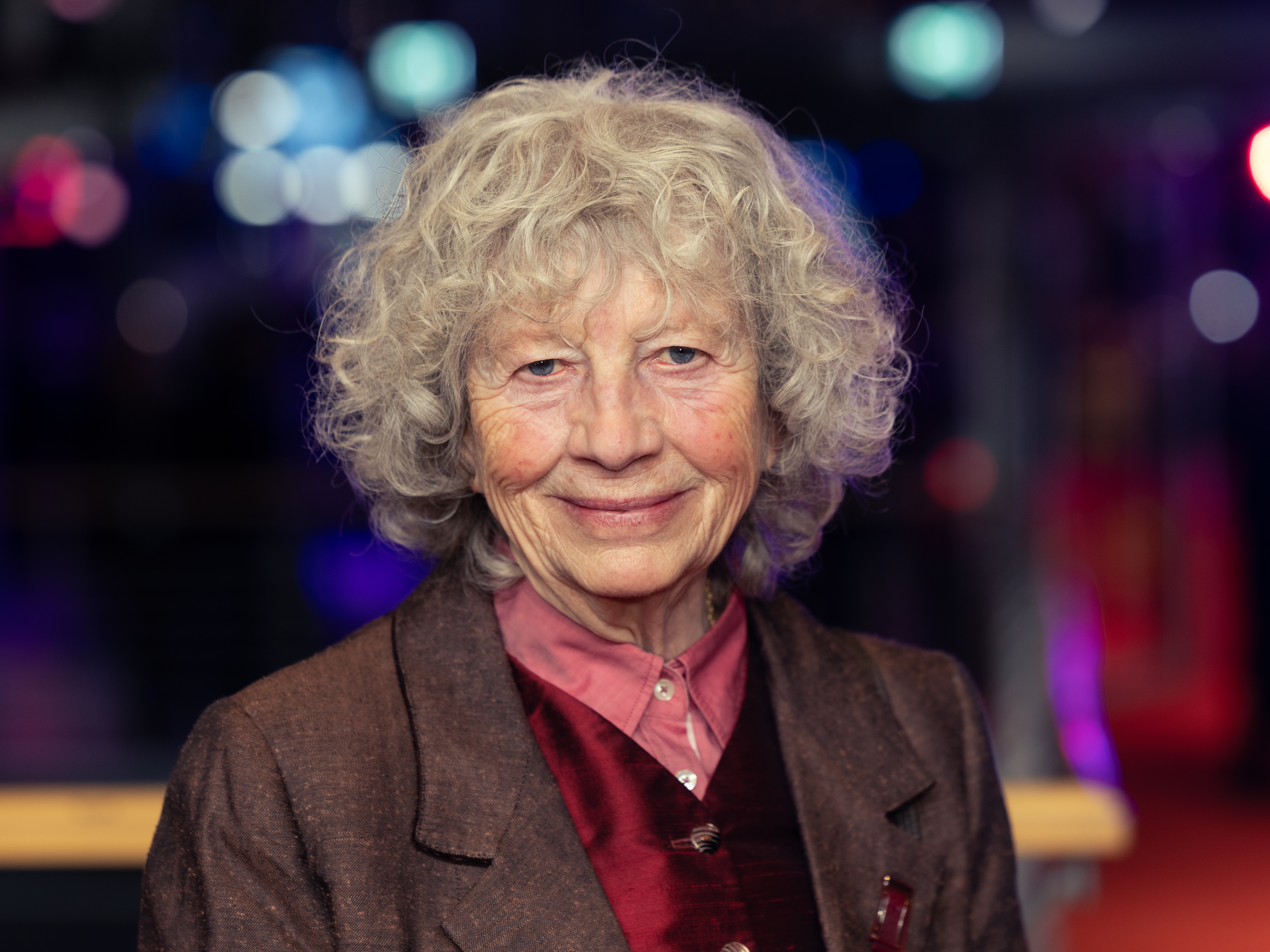
- Ulrike Ottinger in 2026
- Born: 6 June 1942 (age 83); Konstanz, Nazi Germany
- Occupations: Film director Screenwriter
- Years active: 1973 – present

Ulrike Ottinger (born 6 June 1942) is a German filmmaker and photographer.

== Early life ==
Ottinger was borin in Konstanz, Germany. Her mother, Maria Weinberg, was a journalist and her father, Ulrich Ottinger, was a painter.

In 1959, Ottinger began studying at the Academy of Fine Arts in Munich and worked as a painter.

From 1962 to 1968, Ottinger worked as a freelance artist in Paris and studied etching with Johnny Friedlaender, among other techniques. They participated in several exhibitions.

== Career ==
Ottinger's films have been said to "reject or parody the conventions of art cinema and search for new ways to construct visual pleasure, creating various spectator positions usually neglected or marginalized by cinematic address." Her films include strong elements of stylization and fantasy, as well as ethnographic explorations.

In 1966 she wrote her first screenplay, entitled Die Mongolische Doppelschublade.

Ottinger returned to West Germany in 1969 and, in cooperation with the Film Seminar at the University of Konstanz, founded the film club "Visuell", which she directed until 1972. She also headed a gallery and the associated press, which edited works by contemporary artists.

During this time, she met Tabea Blumenschein and Magdalena Montezuma, both of whom have been lead actors in her films since 1972. Ottinger developed her own surrealist film style which was marked by an abandonment of a linear plot and long scenes lingering on mostly female casts in extravagant costumes.

She directed and did stage design for Elfriede Jelinek's Clara S. at the Württembergisches Staatstheater in Stuttgart in 1983, and did the same for Jelinek's Begierde und Fahrerlaubnis in Graz in 1986. In 1989, her film Joan of Arc of Mongolia was entered into the 39th Berlin International Film Festival.

In 2003, Ottinger was selected for a solo exhibition at the Renaissance Society in Chicago. Titled South East Passage, the work "is in three chapters - a travelogue of the artist's journey from southeast Poland to the Bulgarian shores of the Black Sea and a portrait of two coastal cities, Odessa and Istanbul." South East Passage was the first of a two-part series of exhibits exploring Eastern European video work.

On the occasion of the 2009 New York City premiere of The Korean Wedding Chest, The New York Times characterized Ottinger as, "[d]uring the 1980s heyday of the New German Cinema, having constituted a one-woman avant-garde opposition to the sulky male melodramas of Wenders, Fassbinder and Herzog, her films being long, discursive, and wildly inventive."

Ottinger's later work turned to some unconventional documentaries about life in various Asian regions.

Ottinger's horror-drama film The Blood Countess, based on Elizabeth Báthory, a 16th-century Hungarian serial killer, was in development since 2010 before entering production in 2025. Directed by Ottinger and co-written with Elfriede Jelinek, the film stars Isabelle Huppert in the title role.

=== Other activies ===
Ottinger has also worked as a photographer, lithographer, and painter. Ottinger was previously a faculty member of the European Graduate School. Since 2019 she been a member of the Academy of Motion Picture Arts and Sciences.

== Personal life ==
Ottinger has lived in Berlin since 1973. She is a lesbian and has been open about her sexuality for her whole career.

== Filmography ==
- 1972: Laocoön & Sons (Laokoon & Söhne)
- 1973: Berlin-Fieber
- 1975: The Enchantment of the Blue Sailors (Die Betörung der blauen Matrosen)
- 1976: VOAEX
- 1978: Madame X: An Absolute Ruler (Madame X: Eine absolute Herrscherin)
- 1979: Ticket of No Return (Bildnis einer Trinkerin)
- 1981: Freak Orlando
- 1984: Dorian Gray in the Mirror of the Yellow Press (Dorian Gray im Spiegel der Boulevardpresse)
- 1986: China. The Arts – the People (China. Die Künste – der Alltag)
- 1986: Seven Women – Seven Sins (Sieben Frauen – Sieben Todsünden)
- 1989: Joan of Arc of Mongolia
- 1990: Countdown
- 1992: Taiga
- 1997: Exile Shanghai (Exil Shanghai)
- 2002: Southeast Passage (Südostpassage)
- 2004: Twelve Chairs (Zwölf Stühle )
- 2007: Prater
- 2009: Still Moving
- 2009: The Korean Wedding Chest
- 2011: Under Snow
- 2016: Chamisso's Shadow: A Journey to the Bering Sea in Three Chapters
- 2020: Paris Calligrammes
- 2026: The Blood Countess (Die Blutgräfin)

== See also ==
- List of female film and television directors
- List of lesbian filmmakers
- List of LGBTQ-related films directed by women
