= The Masked Singer (German TV series) season 7 =

The Masked Singer
- Season 7
- Starring: Ruth Moschner; Various guests
- Hosted by: Matthias Opdenhövel
- No. of contestants: 9
- Winner: Daniel Donskoy as "Maulwurf"
- Runner-up: Bürger Lars Dietrich as "Werwolf"
- No. of episodes: 6

Release
- Original network: ProSieben
- Original release: 1 October – 5 November 2022

Season chronology
- ← Previous; Season 6 Next → Season 8

The seventh season of the German singing competition The Masked Singer premiered on 1 October 2022 on ProSieben. Ruth Moschner returned to the panel and Matthias Opdenhövel also returned as host.

== Panelists and host ==
Season 7 main panelists and host

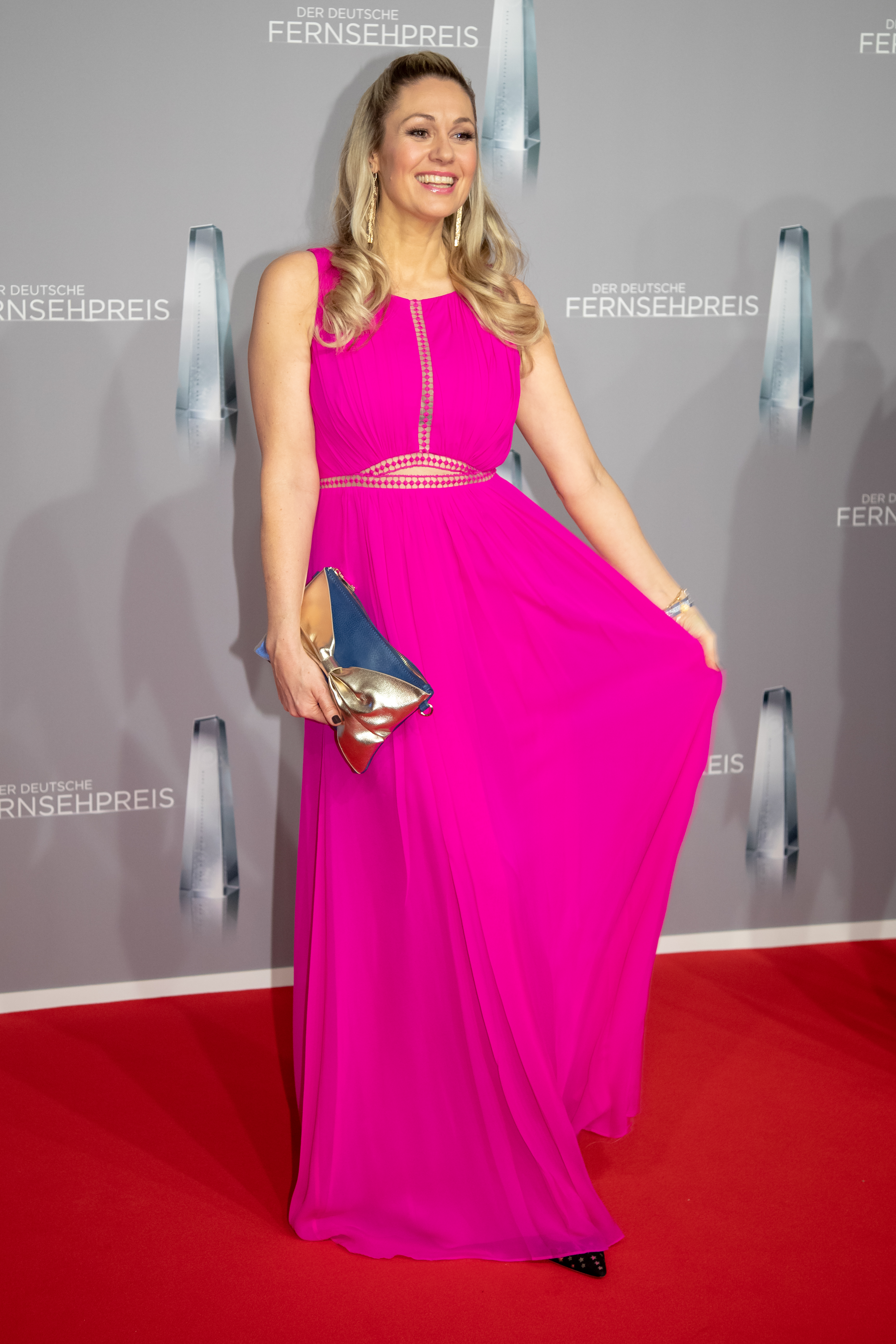
Ruth Moschner

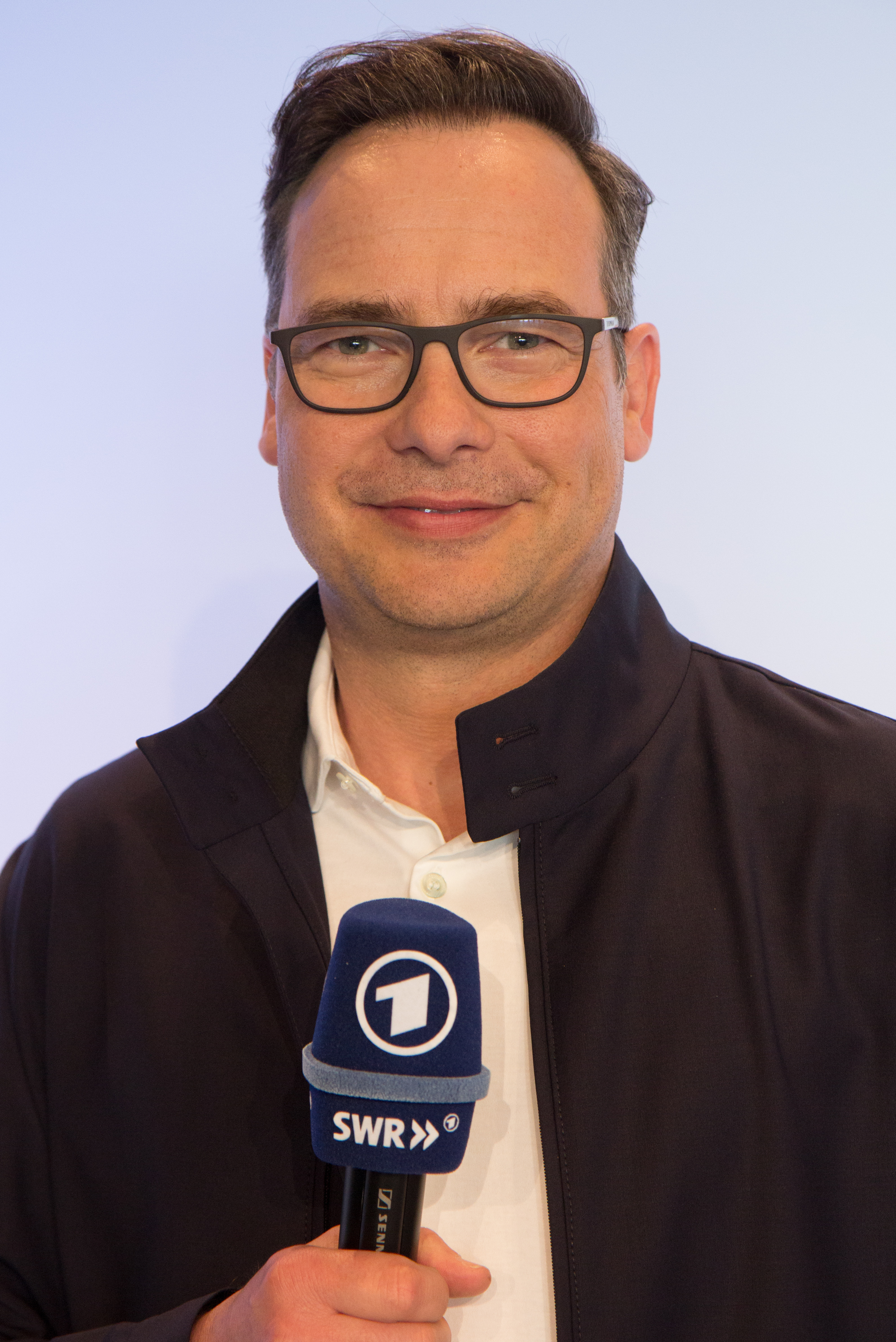
Matthias Opdenhövel

TV Presenter Ruth Moschner returned for her sixth season as a panelist. Matthias Opdenhövel returned for his seventh season as host.

As in previous seasons, a spin-off show named The Masked Singer - red. Special aired after each live episode, hosted by Viviane Geppert for the first and third episodes, Annemarie Carpendale for the second, fourth and sixth episodes and Rebecca Mir for the fifth episode.

=== Guest panelists ===
Various guest panelists appeared as the second and third judge in the judging panel for one episode. These guest panelists included:

Season 7 guest panelists

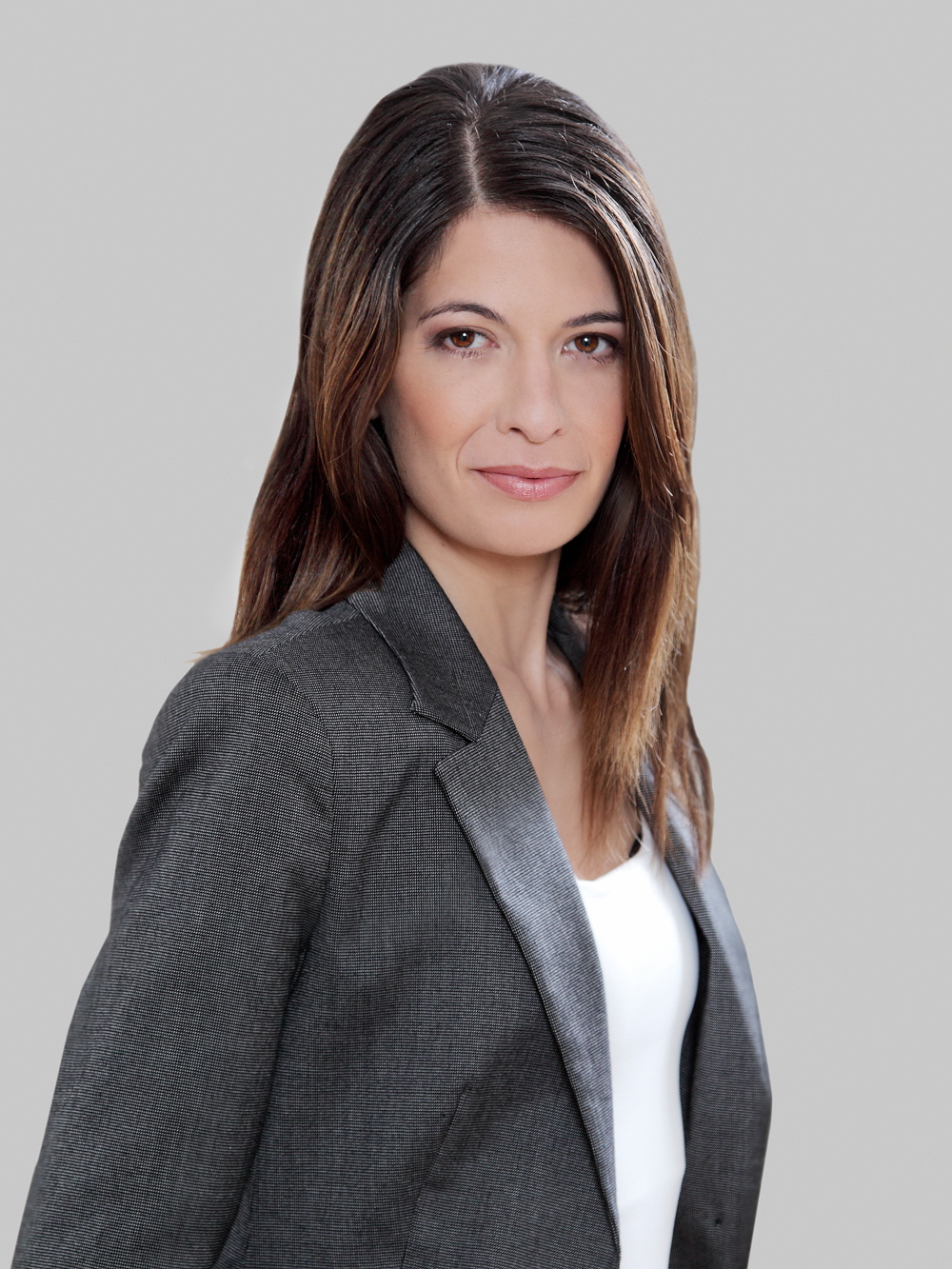
Linda Zervakis (episode 1)

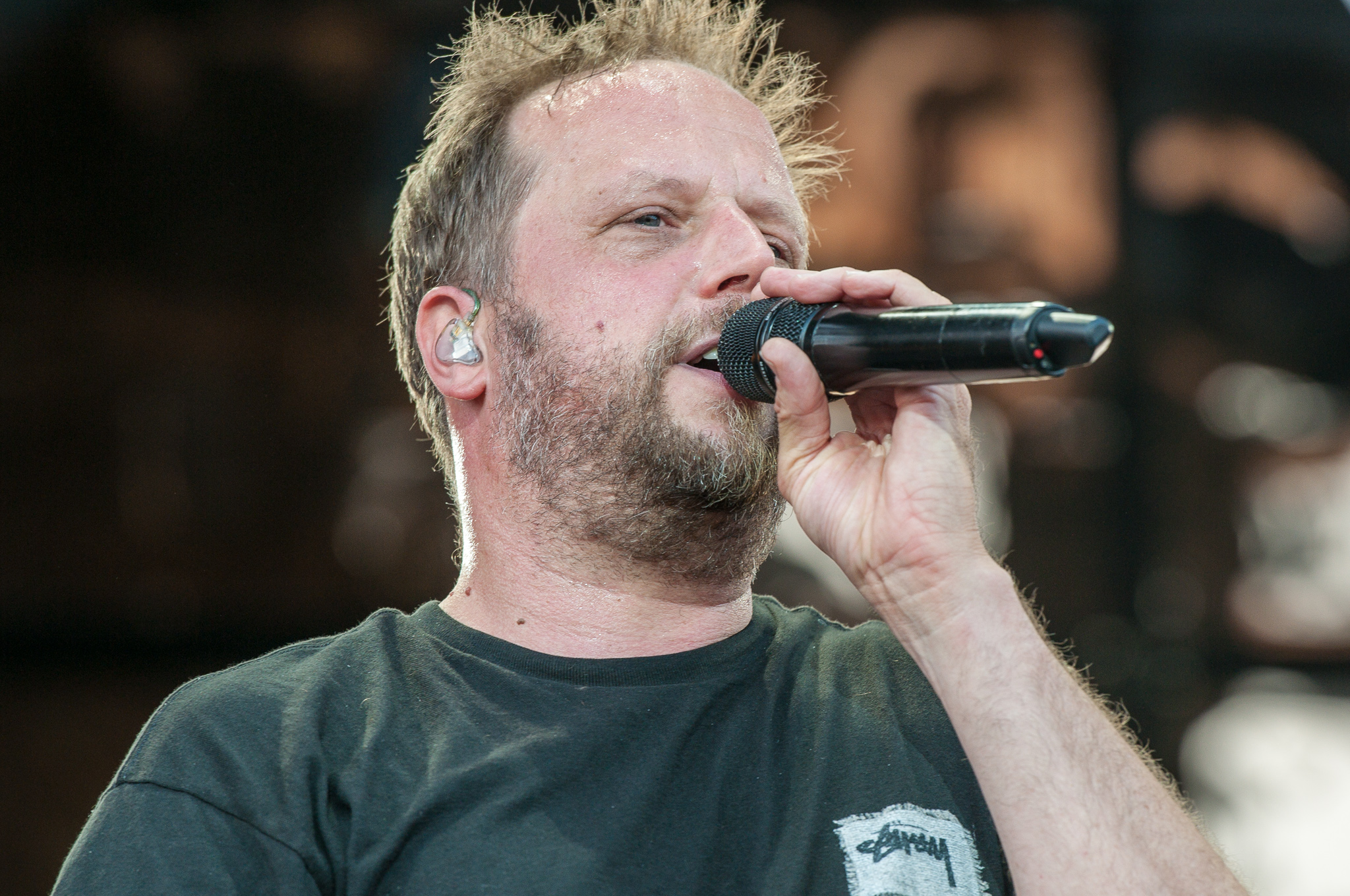
Smudo (episode 1)

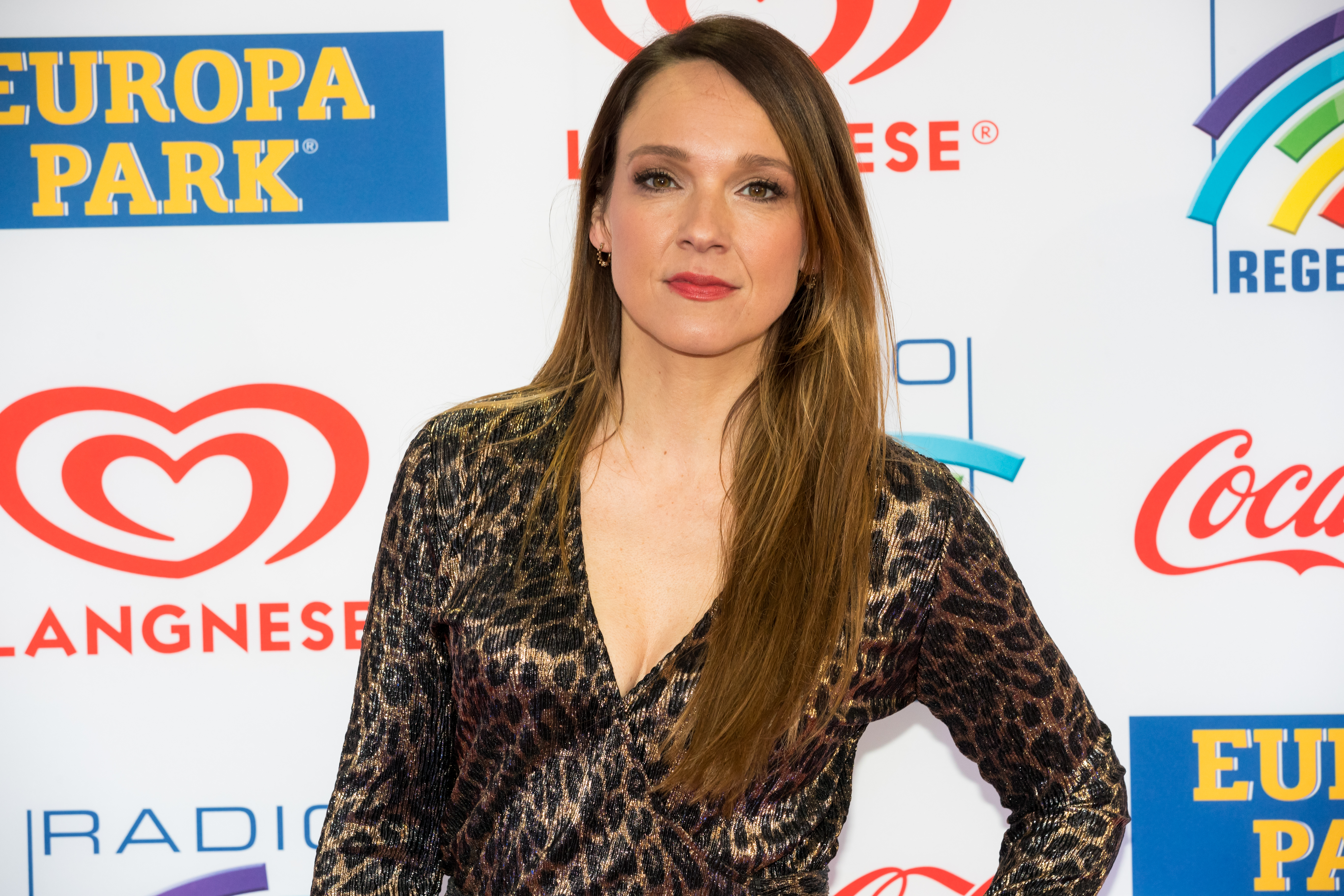
Carolin Kebekus (episode 2)

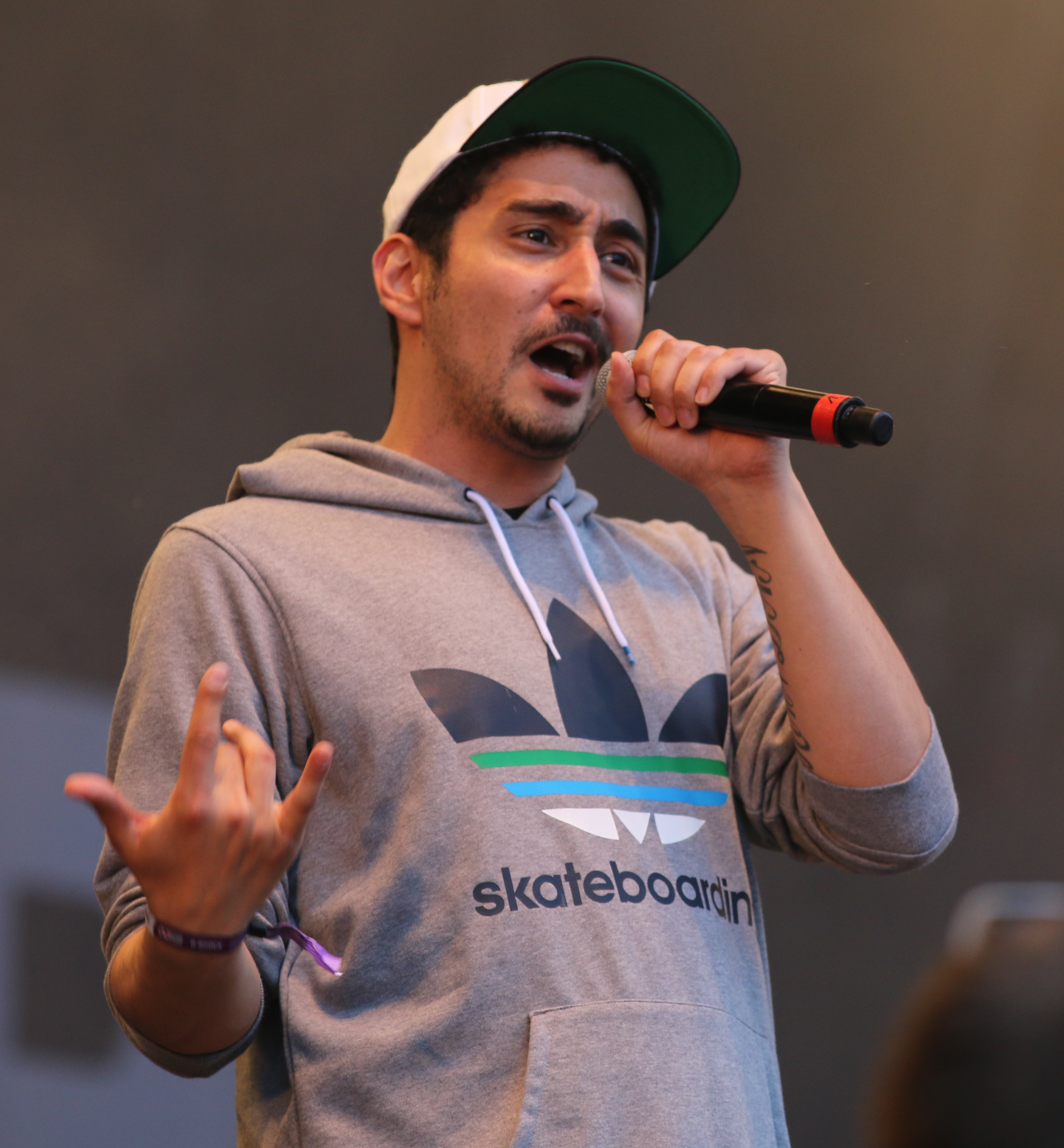
Eko Fresh (episode 2)

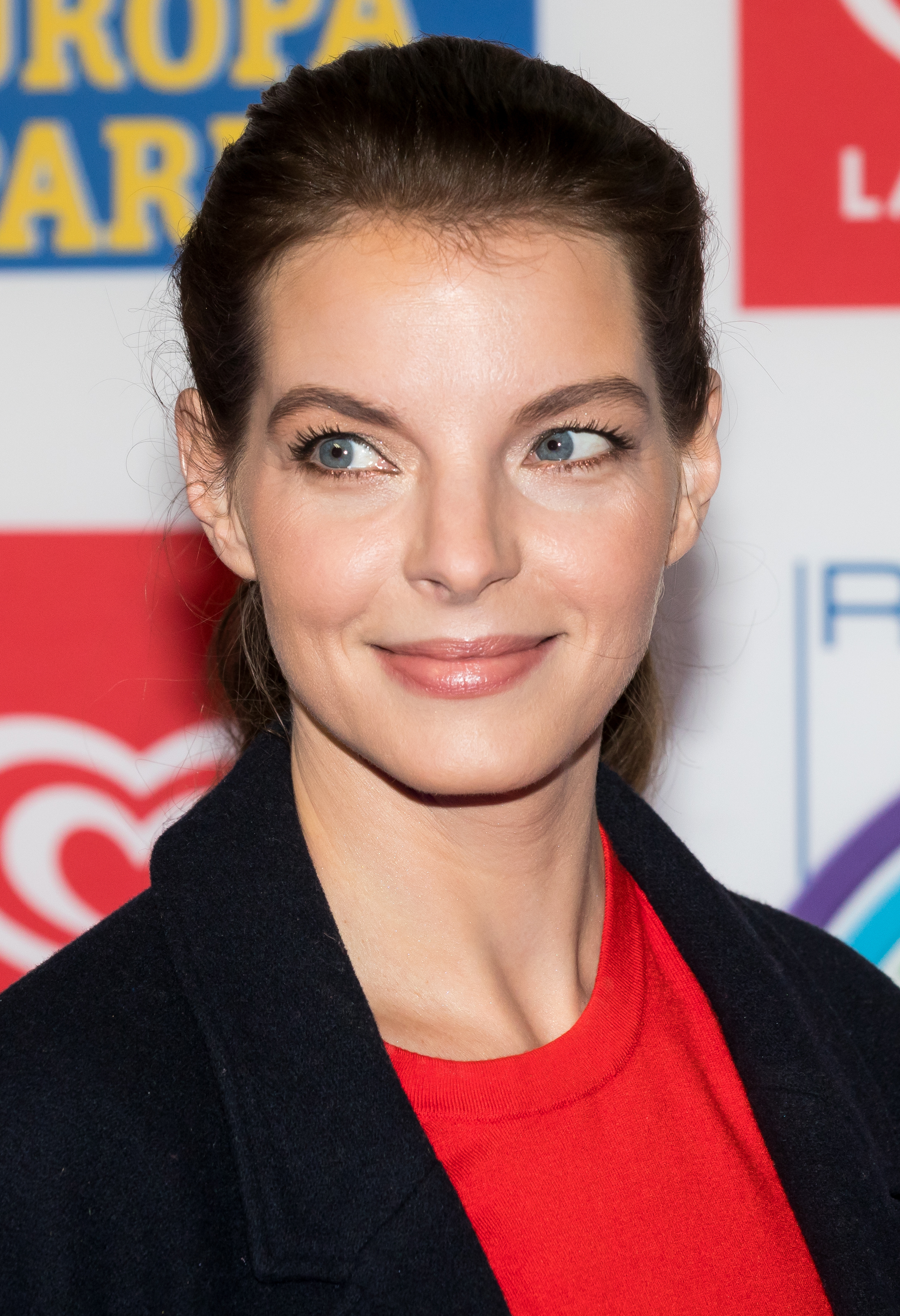
Yvonne Catterfeld (episode 3)

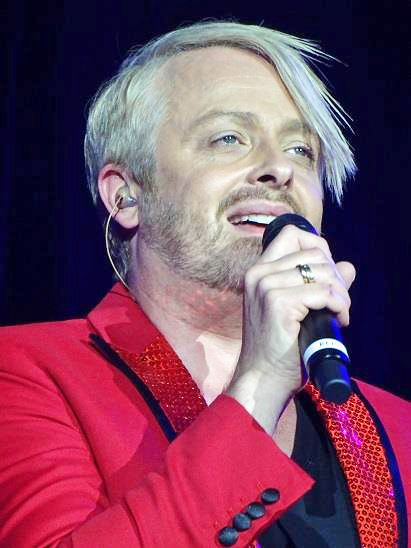
Ross Antony (episode 3)

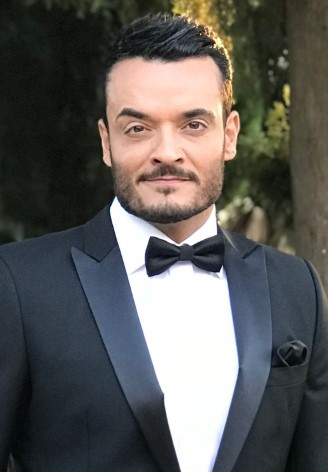
Giovanni Zarrella (episode 4)

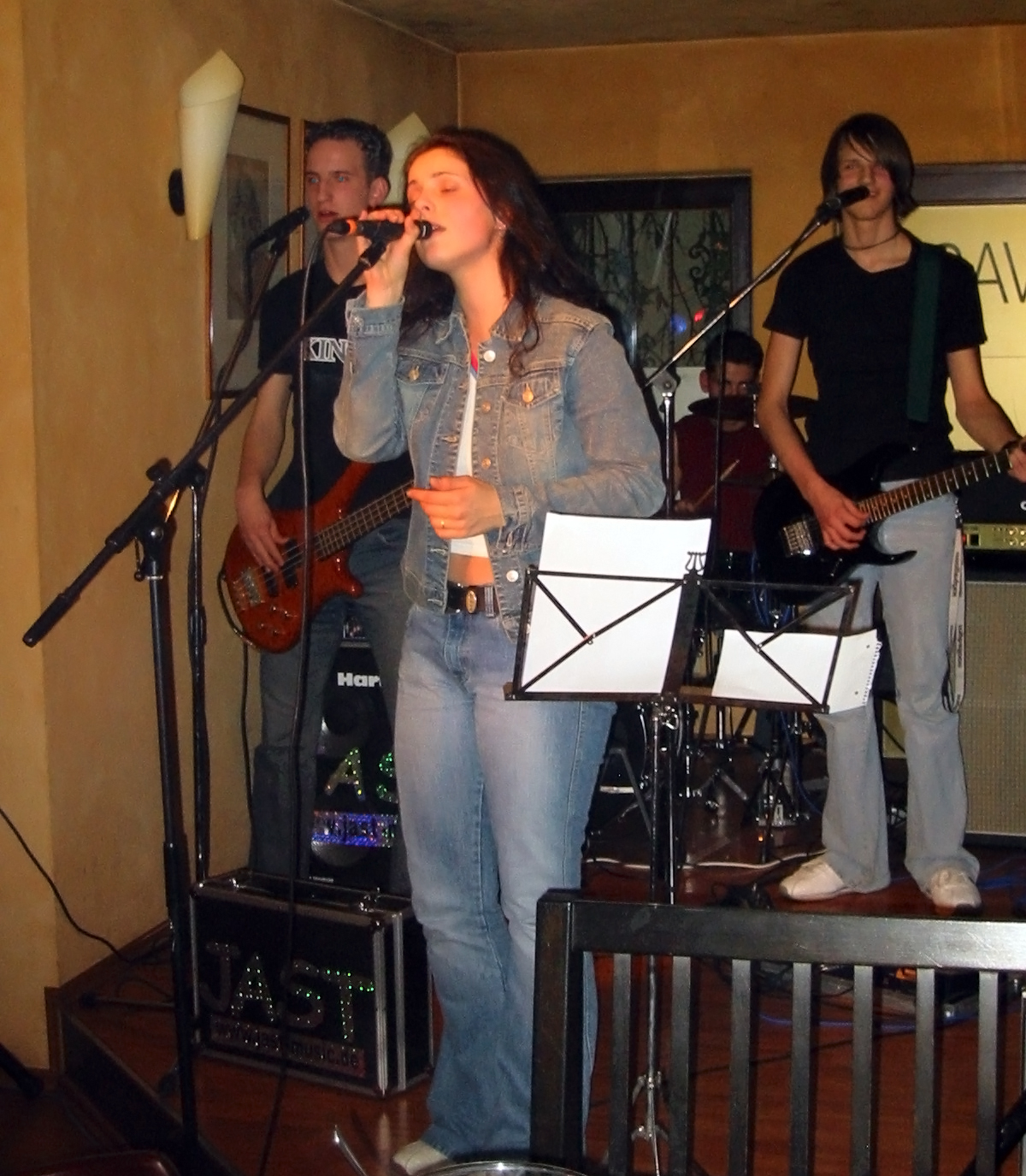
Stefanie Kloß (episode 4)

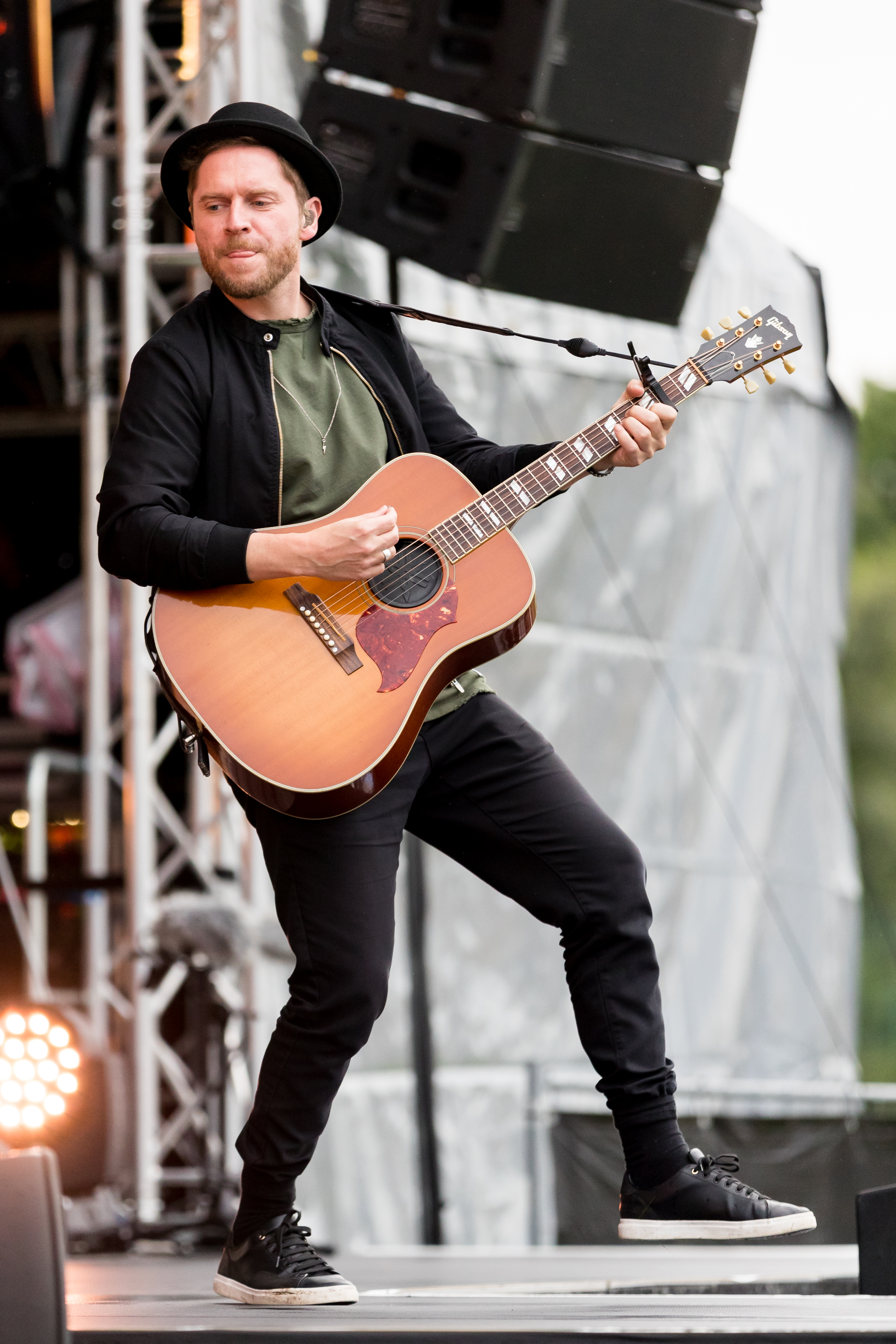
Johannes Oerding (episode 5)

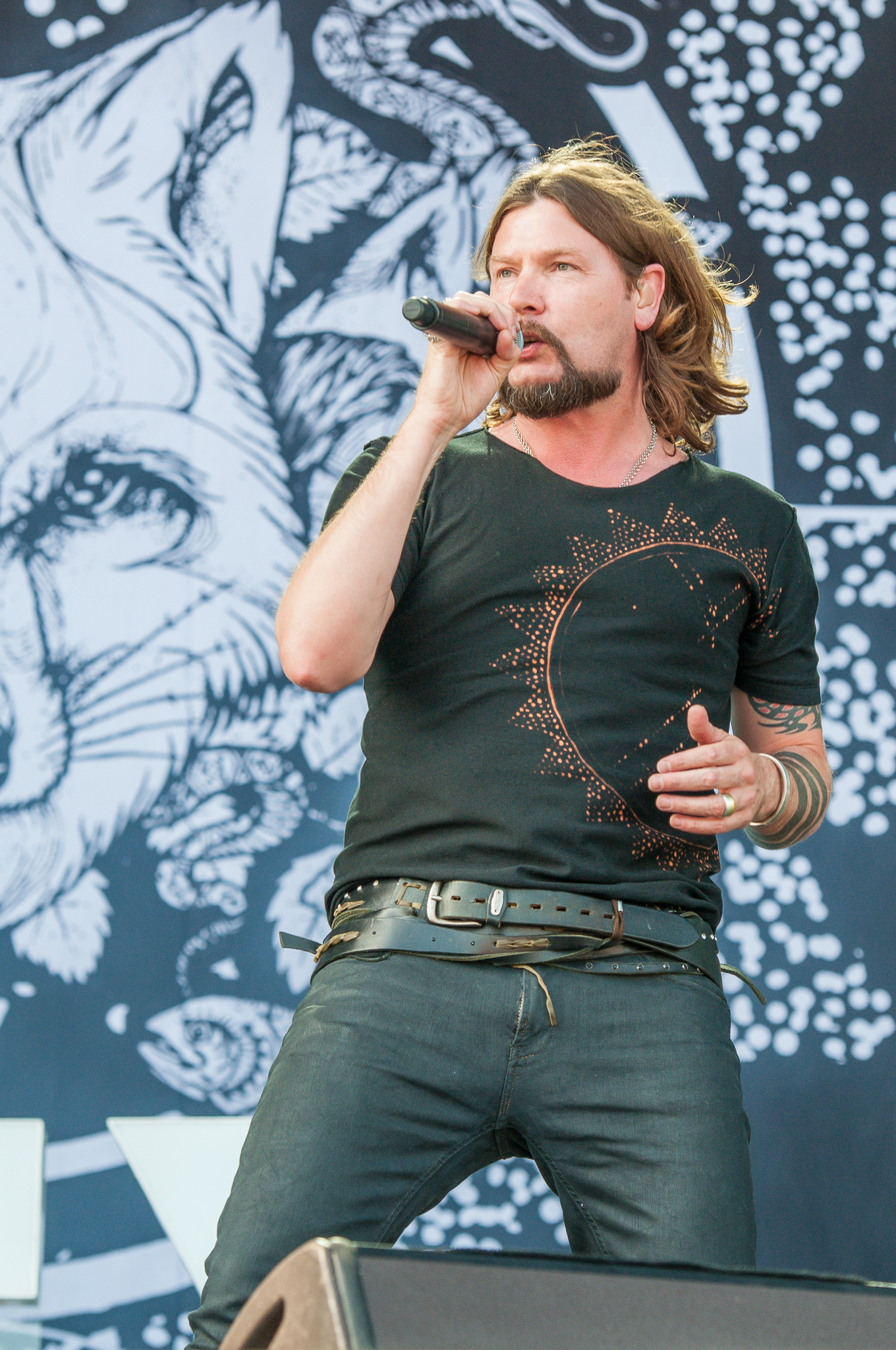
Rea Garvey (episode 5)

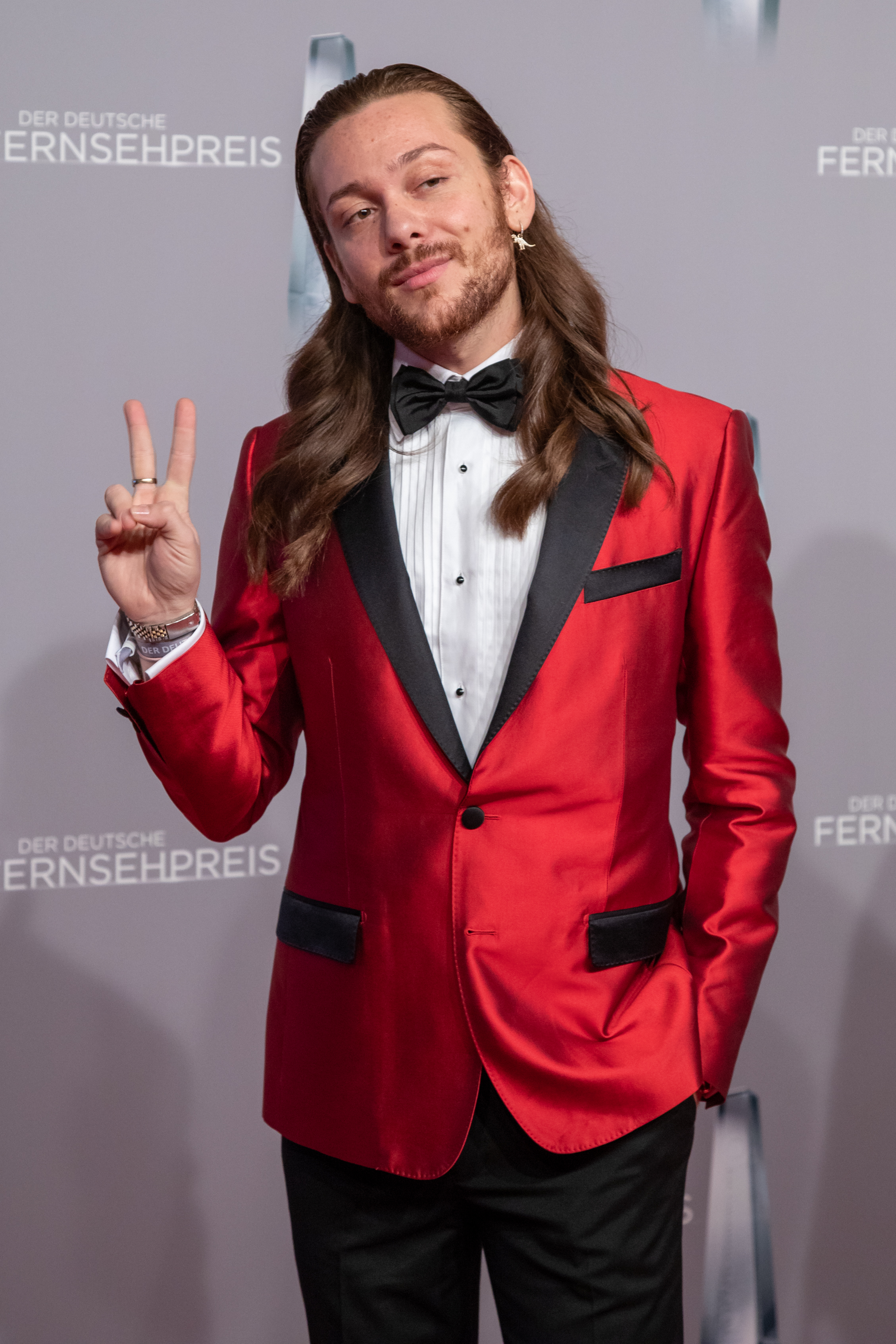
Riccardo Simonetti(episode 6)

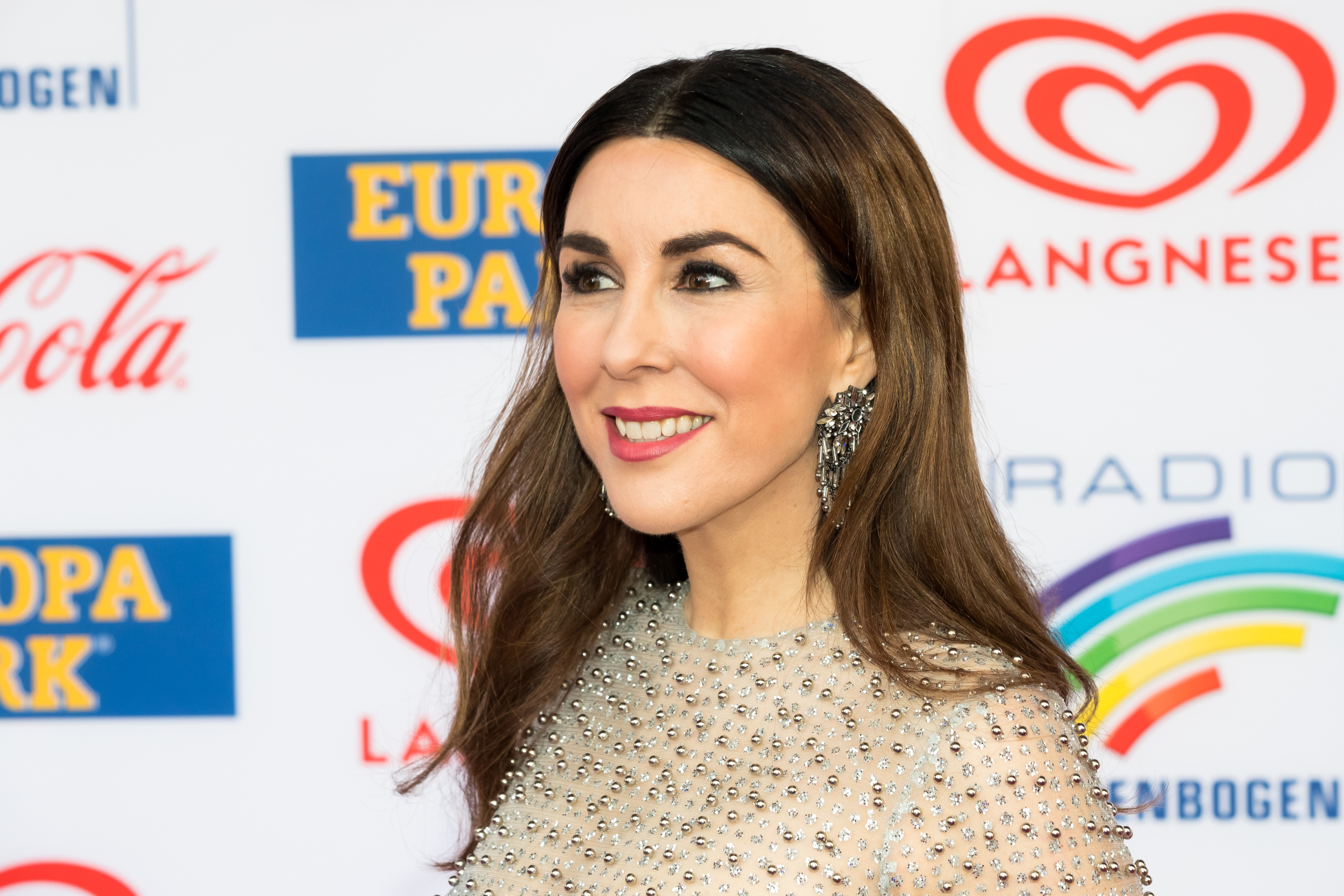
Judith Williams(episode 6)

Episode	Guest Panelists		Ref.
1	Linda Zervakis	Smudo	
2	Carolin Kebekus	Eko Fresh	
3	Yvonne Catterfeld	Ross Antony	
4	Giovanni Zarrella	Stefanie Kloß	
5	Johannes Oerding	Rea Garvey	
6	Riccardo Simonetti	Judith Williams	

== Contestants ==
The season features 9 contestants, one less than previous seasons.

Results
Stage name	Celebrity	Notability	Live Episodes							
Stage name	Celebrity	Notability	1	2	3	4	5	6		
Stage name	Celebrity	Notability	1	2	3	4	5	A	B	C
Maulwurf "Mole"	Daniel Donskoy	Actor	WIN	WIN	WIN	WIN	WIN	SAFE	SAFE	WINNER
Werwolf "Werewolf"	Bürger Lars Dietrich	Comedian/Actor	WIN	WIN	WIN	WIN	WIN	SAFE	SAFE	RUNNER-UP
Rosty (Note: The character was initially named "No Name" up to Episode 3, where his name was officially changed to Rosty.)	Rick Kavanian	Actor	WIN	RISK	RISK	RISK	RISK	SAFE	THIRD	
Zahnfee "Tooth Fairy"	Leslie Clio	Singer	WIN	RISK	WIN	WIN	RISK	OUT		
Goldi	Armin Rohde	Actor	RISK	WIN	WIN	RISK	OUT			
Black Mamba	Felix von Jascheroff	Actor	WIN	WIN	RISK	OUT				
Pfeife "Whistle"	Thomas Hayo	Creative Director	WIN	RISK	OUT					
Walross "Walrus"	Jutta Speidel	Actress	RISK	OUT						
Brokkoli "Broccoli"	Katja Burkard	TV Presenter	OUT							

The masked singer won their face-off and remained in the competition.
The masked singer lost their face-off and was in the bottom four/three/two, but was not eliminated.
The masked singer was safe from elimination.
The masked singer was eliminated from the competition and unmasked upon their elimination.
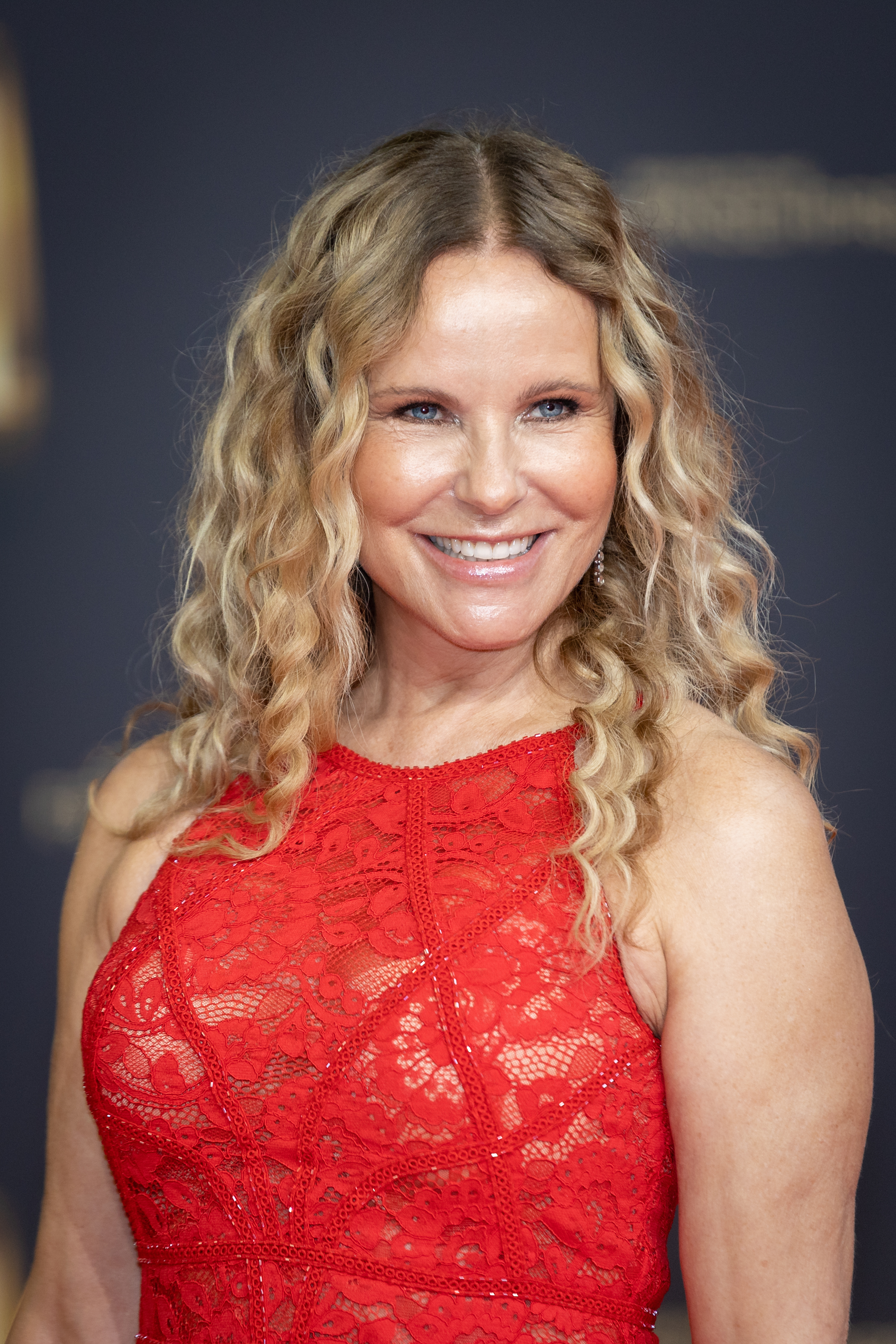
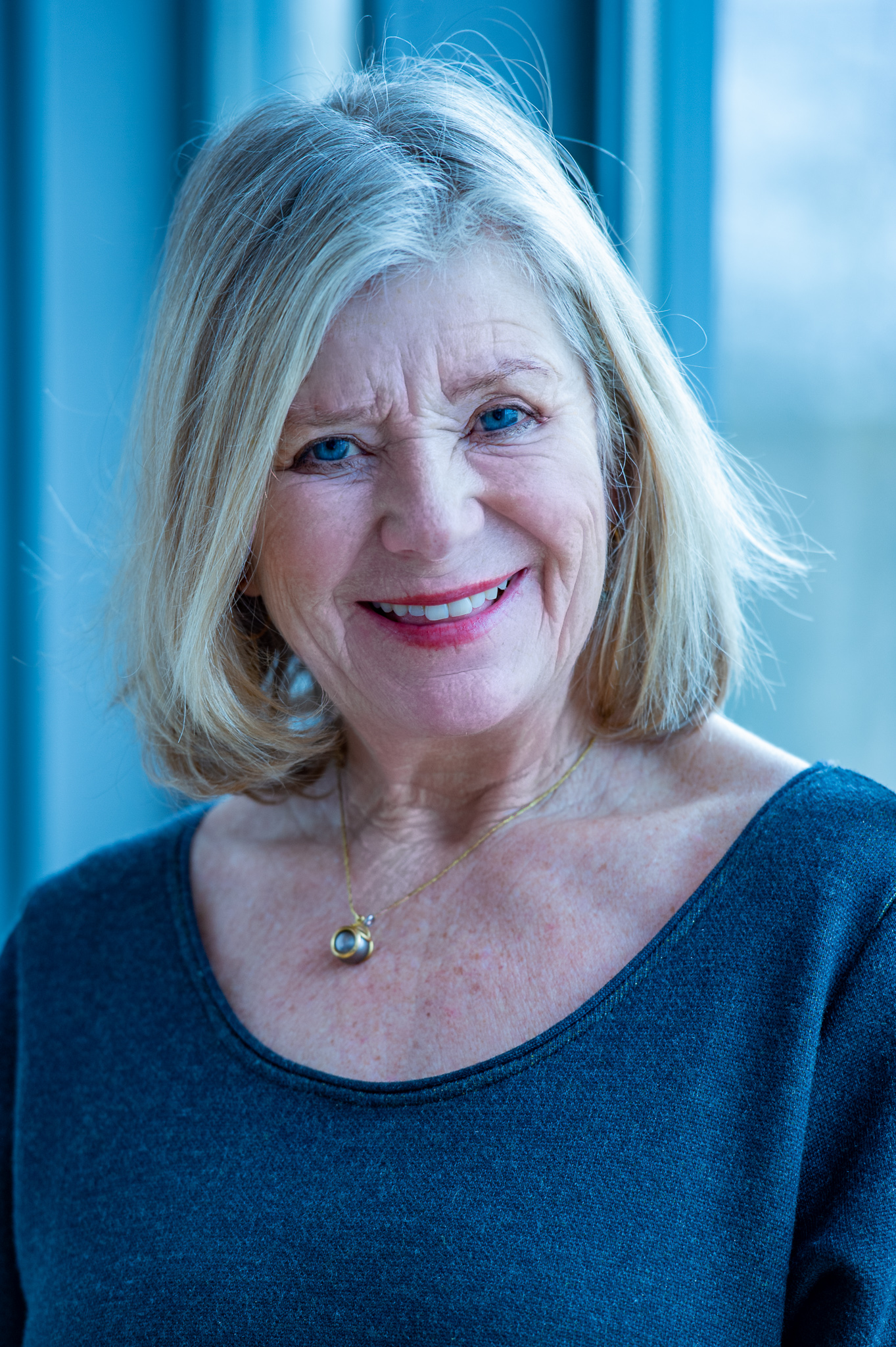
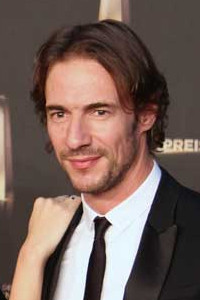
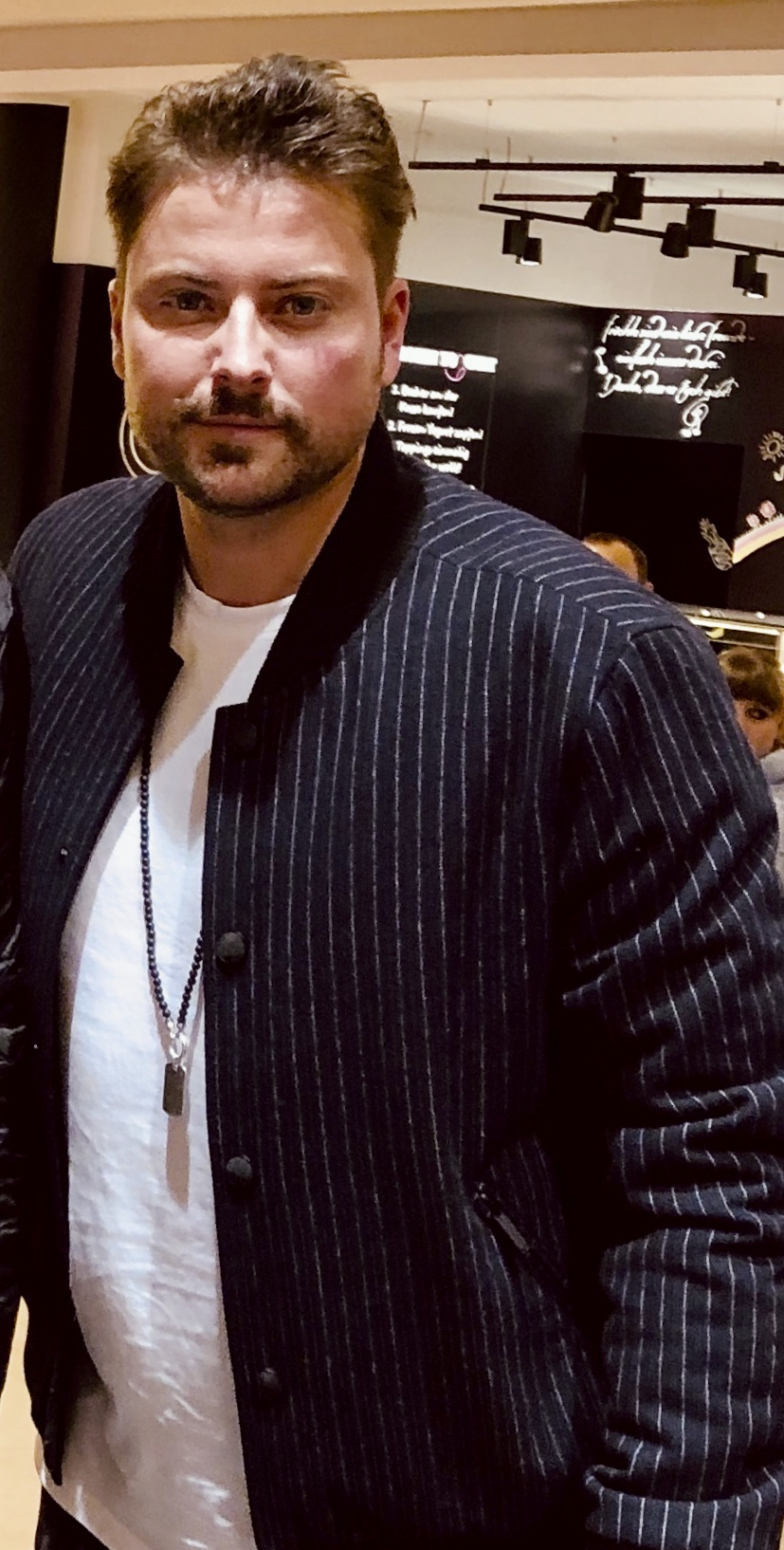
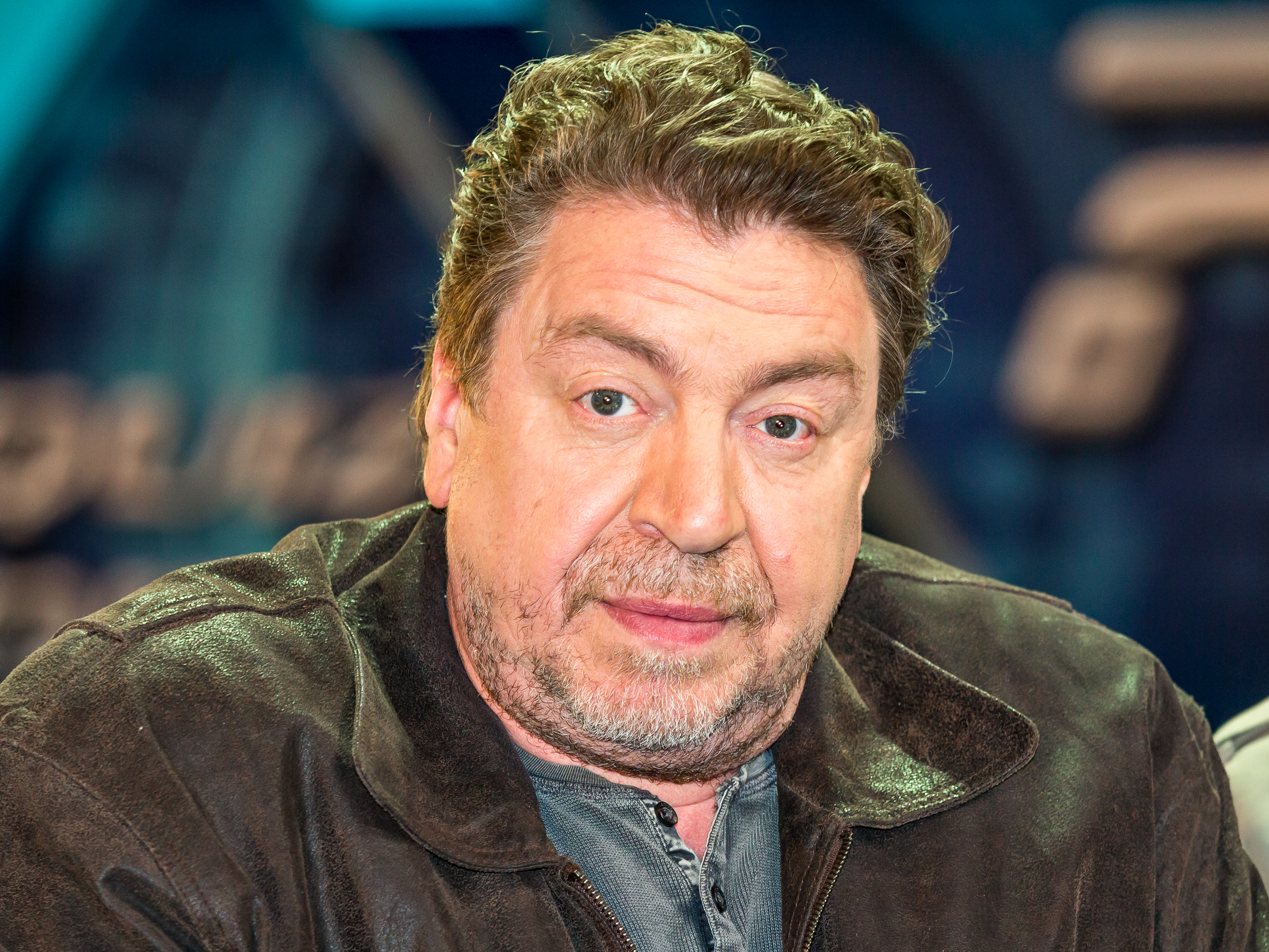
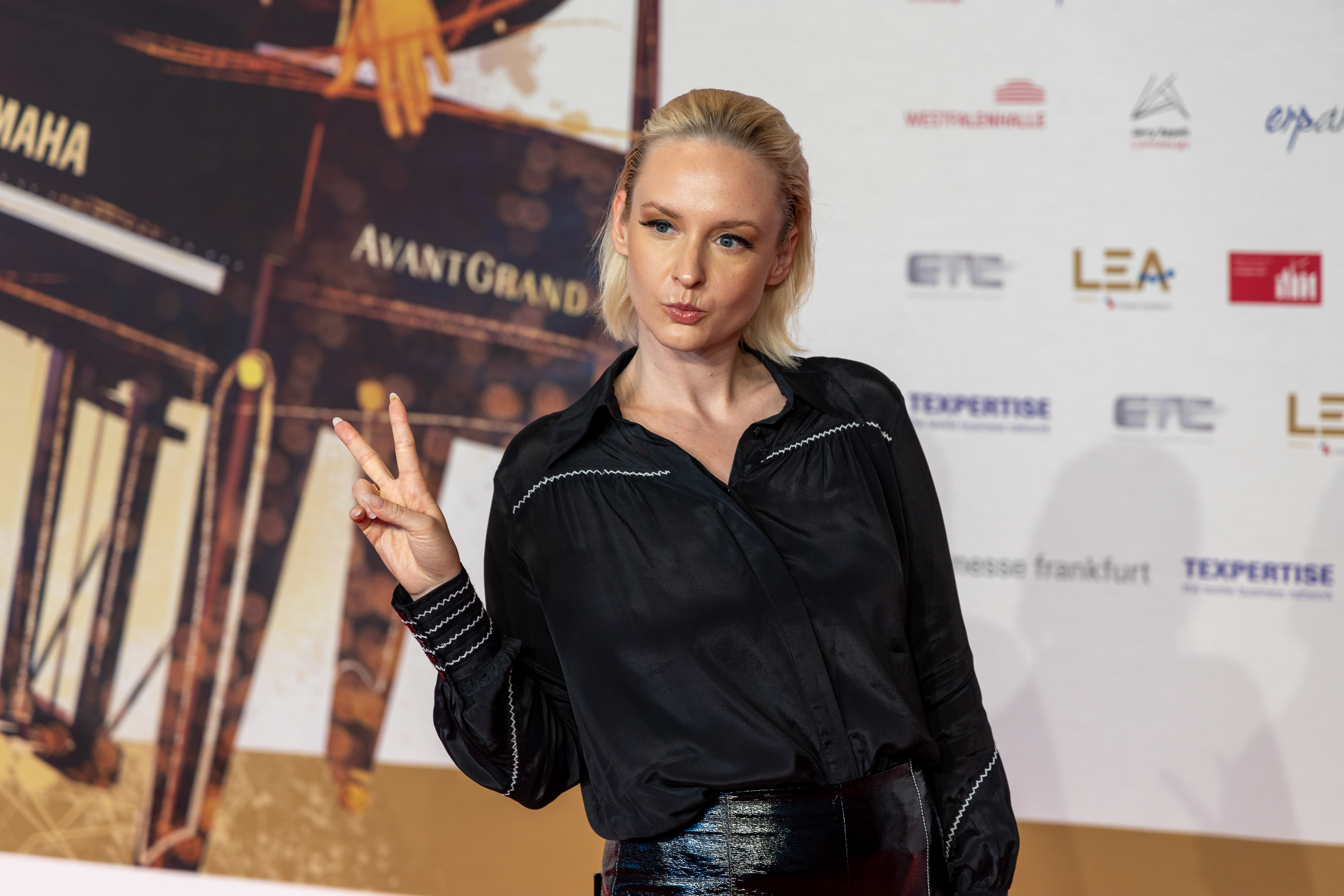
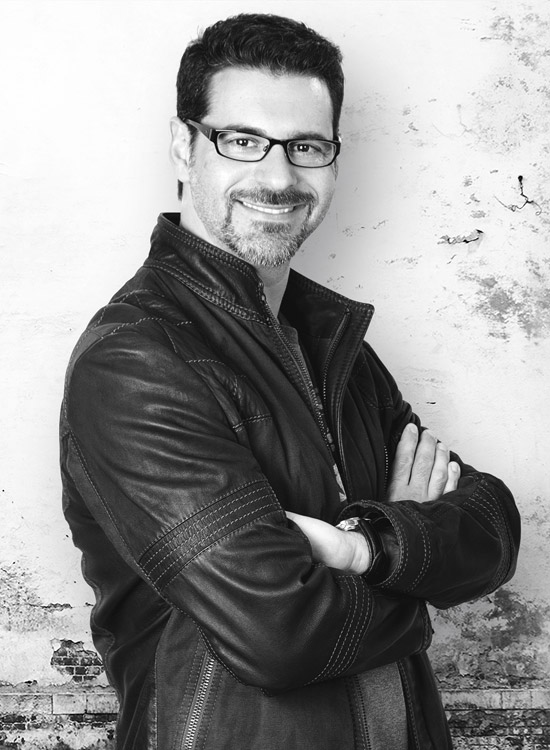
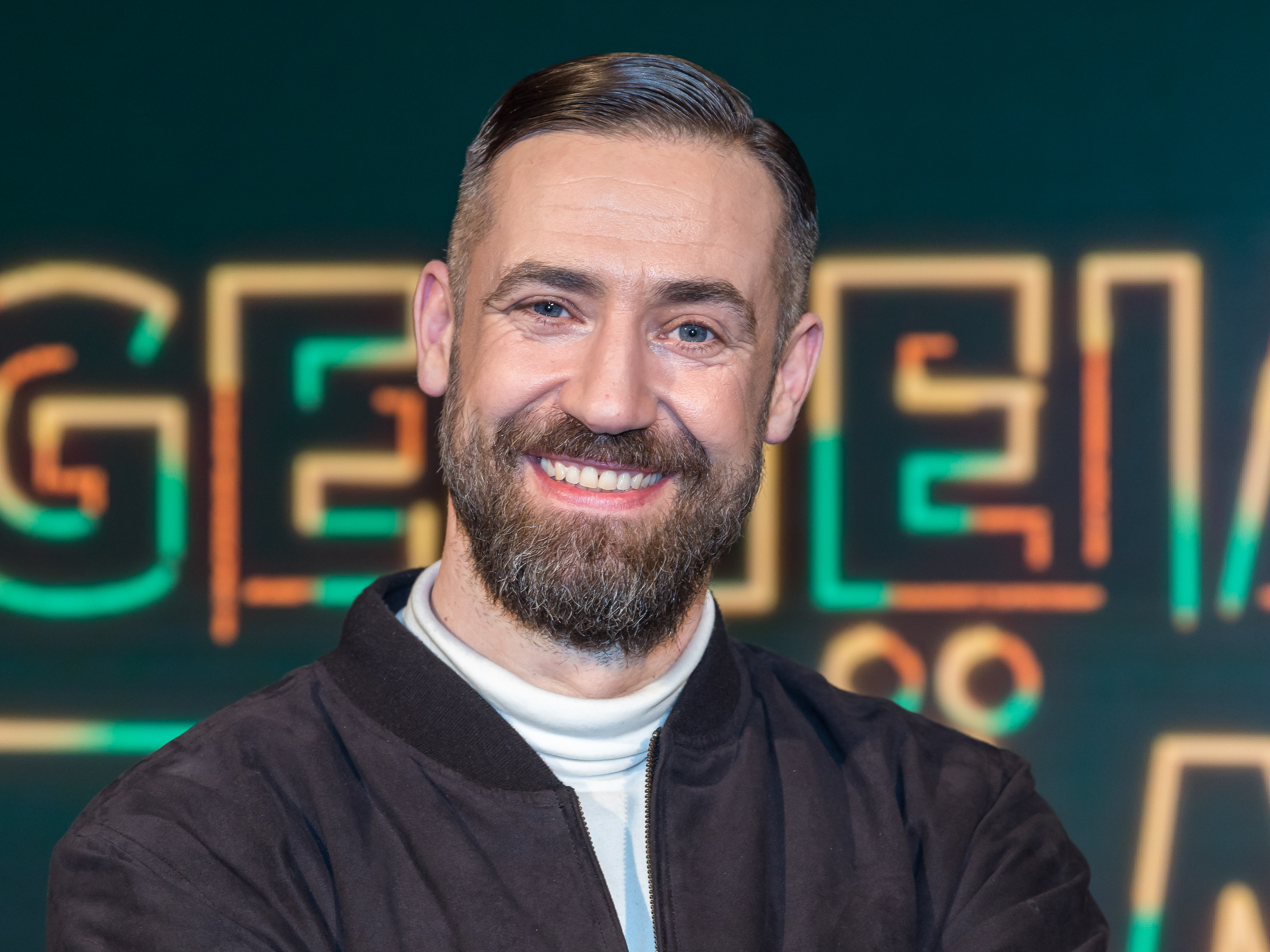
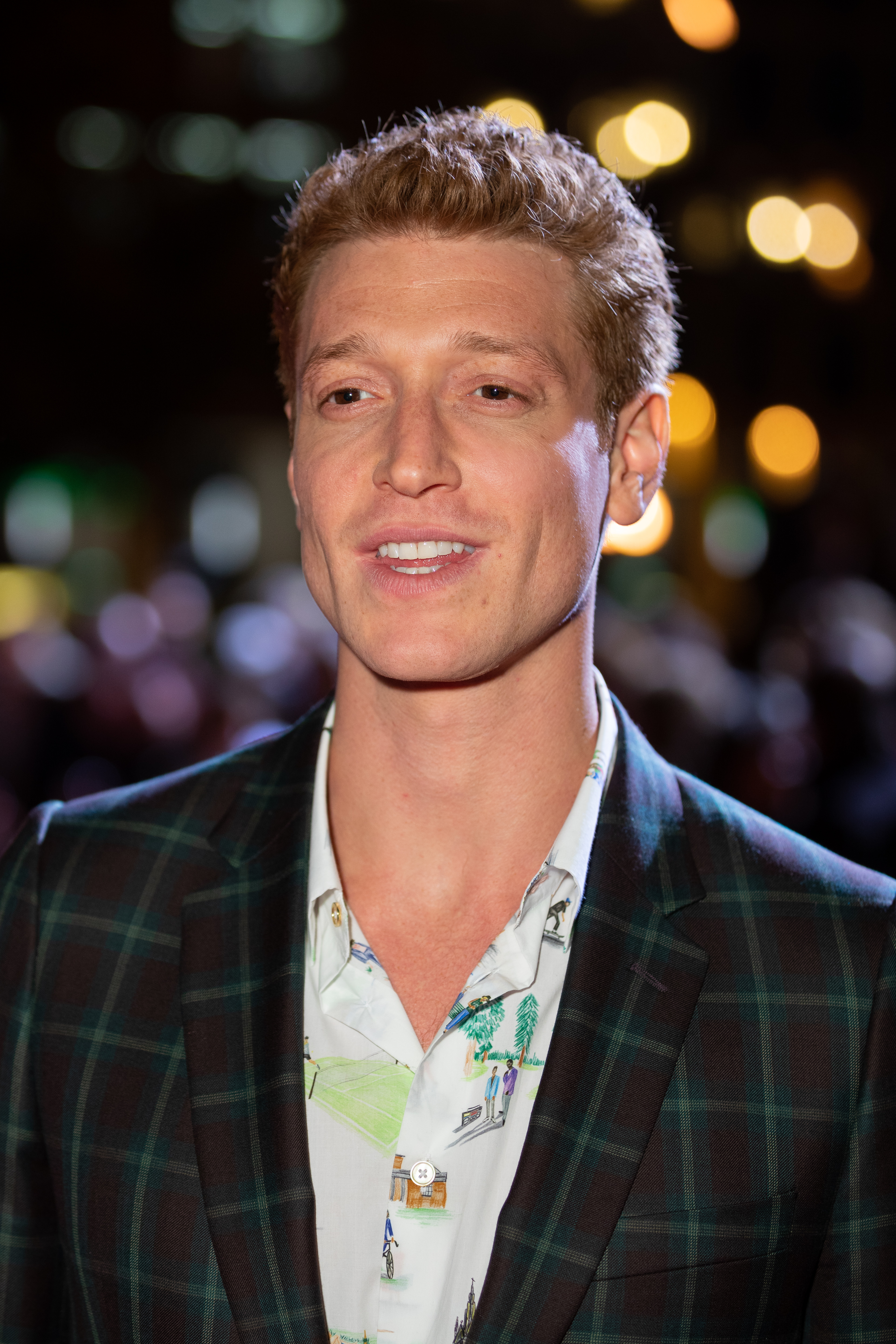
The celebrities who have competed in the seventh season of The Masked Singer, pictured in order of elimination (l-r):
Katja Burkard ("Brokkoli"), Jutta Speidel ("Walross"), Thomas Hayo ("Pfeife"), Felix von Jascheroff ("Black Mamba"), Armin Rohde ("Goldi"), Leslie Clio ("Zahnfee"), Rick Kavanian ("Rosty"), Bürger Lars Dietrich ("Werwolf"), Daniel Donskoy ("Maulwurf")

== Episodes ==
=== Week 1 (1 October) ===
Performances on the first live episode
#	Stage name	Song	Identity	Result
1	Maulwurf	"Holding Out for a Hero" by Bonnie Tyler	undisclosed	WIN
2	Brokkoli	"So What" by Pink	Katja Burkard	OUT
3	Black Mamba	"Trust in Me" from The Jungle Book	undisclosed	WIN
4	Werwolf	"Hard Rock Hallelujah" by Lordi	undisclosed	WIN
5	Rosty	"Mr. Lonely" by Bobby Vinton	undisclosed	WIN
6	Walross	"Move in the Right Direction" by Gossip	undisclosed	RISK
7	Goldi	"An Angel" by The Kelly Family	undisclosed	RISK
8	Pfeife	"Smooth Criminal" by Michael Jackson	undisclosed	WIN
9	Zahnfee	"When You Believe" by Mariah Carey & Whitney Houston	undisclosed	WIN

=== Week 2 (8 October) ===
Performances on the second live episode
#	Stage name	Song	Identity	Result
1	Zahnfee	"Firework" by Katy Perry	undisclosed	RISK
2	Black Mamba	"Temple of Love" by Sisters of Mercy	undisclosed	WIN
3	Pfeife	"Wicked Game" by Chris Isaak	undisclosed	RISK
4	Goldi	"Bad Day" by Daniel Powter	undisclosed	WIN
5	Rosty	"As It Was" by Harry Styles	undisclosed	RISK
6	Werwolf	"Enter Sandman" by Metallica	undisclosed	WIN
7	Walross	"What You Waiting For" by Gwen Stefani	Jutta Speidel	OUT
8	Maulwurf	"Can't Hold Us" by Macklemore & Ryan Lewis/"Pony" Ginuwine	undisclosed	WIN

=== Week 3 (15 October) ===
Performances on the third live episode
#	Stage name	Song		Identity	Result
1	Black Mamba	"Like a Prayer" by Madonna	"Relight My Fire" by Take That	undisclosed	RISK
2	Maulwurf	"My Heart Will Go On" by Celine Dion	"Relight My Fire" by Take That	undisclosed	WIN
3	Goldi	"Gold" by Spandau Ballet	"Relight My Fire" by Take That	undisclosed	WIN
4	Zahnfee	"Kings & Queens" by Ava Max	"Bang Bang" by Jessie J, Ariana Grande and Nicki Minaj	undisclosed	WIN
5	Pfeife	"Live and Let Die" by Paul McCartney and Wings	"Bang Bang" by Jessie J, Ariana Grande and Nicki Minaj	Thomas Hayo	OUT
6	Rosty	"Stayin' Alive" by Bee Gees	"Walk This Way" by Run-D.M.C. & Aerosmith	undisclosed	RISK
7	Werwolf	"You're My Heart, You're My Soul" by Modern Talking	"Walk This Way" by Run-D.M.C. & Aerosmith	undisclosed	WIN

=== Week 4 (22 October) ===
Performances on the fourth live episode
#	Stage name	Song		Identity	Result
1	Maulwurf	"Larger than Life" by Backstreet Boys	"Felicità" by Al Bano & Romina Power	undisclosed	WIN
2	Rosty	"Happy" by Pharrell Williams	"Felicità" by Al Bano & Romina Power	undisclosed	RISK
3	Zahnfee	"Don't Start Now" by Dua Lipa	"Beauty and the Beast" by Ariana Grande & John Legend	undisclosed	WIN
4	Black Mamba	"Unholy" by Sam Smith & Kim Petras	"Beauty and the Beast" by Ariana Grande & John Legend	Felix von Jascheroff	OUT
5	Goldi	"Looking for Freedom" by David Hasselhoff	"Born to Be Wild" by Steppenwolf	undisclosed	RISK
6	Werwolf	"In My Blood" by Shawn Mendes	"Born to Be Wild" by Steppenwolf	undisclosed	WIN

=== Week 5 (29 October) - Semi-final ===
Performances on the fifth live episode
#	Stage name	Song	Identity	Result
1	Rosty	"Get Down on It" by Kool & The Gang	undisclosed	RISK
2	Zahnfee	"Remedy" by Leony	undisclosed	RISK
3	Maulwurf	"Breathe Easy" by Blue	undisclosed	WIN
4	Goldi	"Time to Say Goodbye" by Andrea Bocelli/"We Will Rock You" by Queen	undisclosed	RISK
5	Werwolf	"Personal Jesus" by Marilyn Manson	undisclosed	WIN
Sing off details			Identity	Result
1	Rosty	"Holiday" by Madonna	undisclosed	SAFE
2	Zahnfee	"Stay" by Rihanna ft. Mikky Ekko	undisclosed	SAFE
3	Goldi	"Sharp Dressed Man" by ZZ Top/"Addicted to Love" by Robert Palmer	Armin Rohde	OUT

=== Week 6 (5 November) - Final ===
- Group number: "Beautiful Day" by U2

==== Round One ====
Performances on the final live episode – Round one
#	Stage name	Song	Identity	Result
1	Maulwurf	"Grenade" by Bruno Mars	undisclosed	SAFE
2	Zahnfee	"Take Me to Church" by Hozier	Leslie Clio	OUT
3	Rosty	"Miami" by Will Smith/ "Conga" by Gloria Estefan	undisclosed	SAFE
4	Werwolf	"Numb" by Linkin Park	undisclosed	SAFE

==== Round Two ====
Performances on the final live episode – round two
#	Stage name	Song with (Zebra) Ella Endlich	Identity	Result
1	Maulwurf	"Sex on Fire" by Kings of Leon	undisclosed	SAFE
2	Rosty	"I'll Be There for You" by The Rembrandts	Rick Kavanian	THIRD
3	Werwolf	"Hurt" by Johnny Cash	undisclosed	SAFE

==== Round Three ====
Performances on the final live episode – round three
#	Stage name	Song	Identity	Result
1	Maulwurf	"Larger than Life" by Backstreet Boys	Daniel Donskoy	WINNER
2	Werwolf	"Hard Rock Hallelujah" by Lordi	Bürger Lars Dietrich	RUNNER-UP

== Reception ==
=== Ratings ===
Episode	Original airdate	Timeslot	Viewers (in millions)		Share (in %)		Source
Episode	Original airdate	Timeslot	Household	Adults 14–49	Household	Adults 14–49	Source
1	1 October 2022	Saturday 8:15 pm	2.42	1.15	10.3	21.2	
2	8 October 2022	Saturday 8:15 pm	2.12	1.03	8.5	17.1	
3	15 October 2022	Saturday 8:15 pm	2.19	1.07	8.9	20.2	
4	22 October 2022	Saturday 8:15 pm	1.86	0.87	7.6	15.3	
5	29 October 2022	Saturday 8:15 pm	2.13	1.01	9.0	19.0	
6	5 November 2022	Saturday 8:15 pm	2.29	1.21	10.0	23.1	
Average			2.17	1.06	9.1	19.3	
