= Der Bergdoktor =

Der Bergdoktor may refer to:

- Der Bergdoktor (1992 TV series)
- Der Bergdoktor (2008 TV series)
