= Katja Burkard =

German television presenter

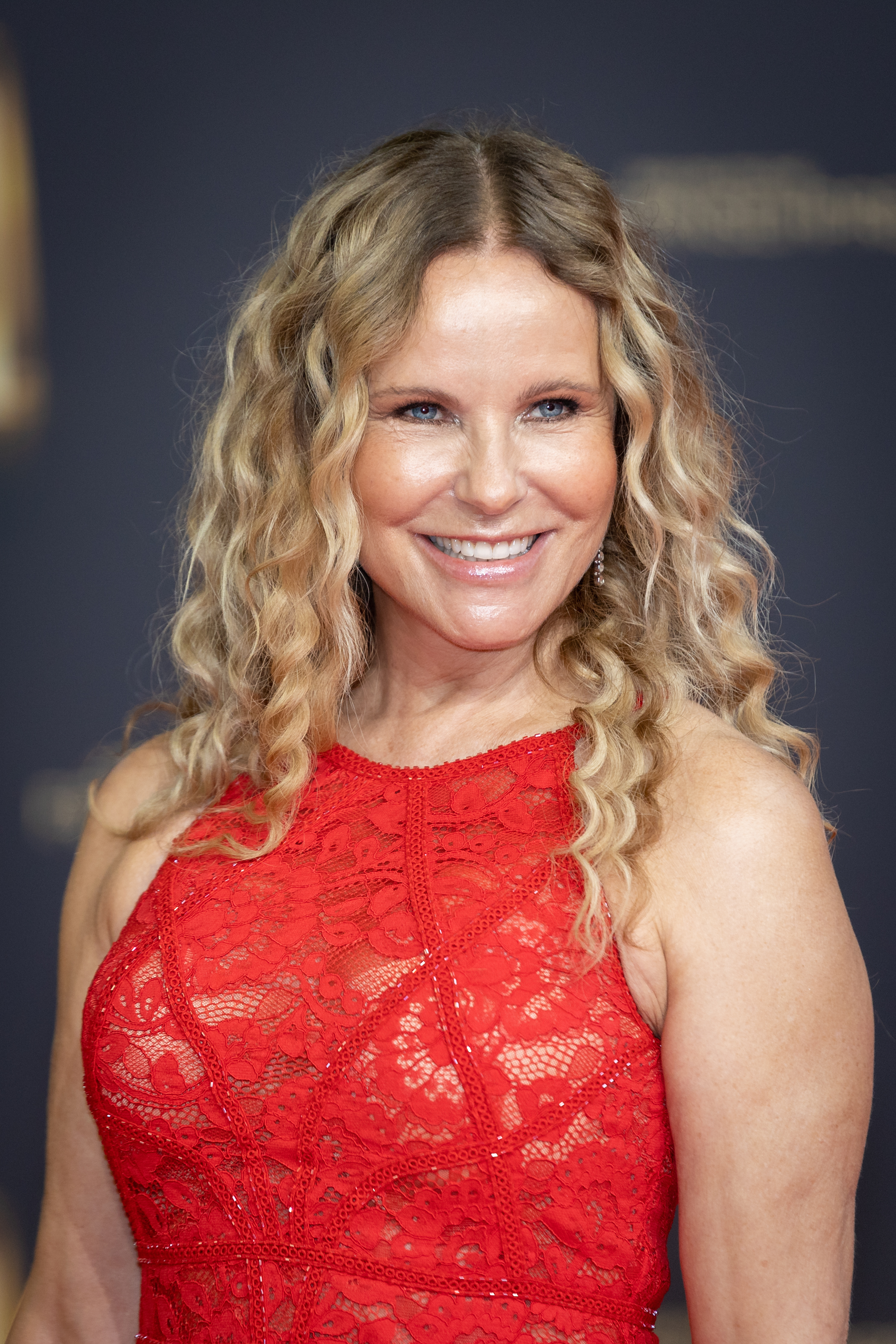
- Burkard at the 2022 German Television Awards
- Born: Katja Katharina Burkard; 21 April 1965 (age 61); Bad Marienberg, West Germany
- Education: Konrad-Adenauer-Gymnasium Westerburg
- Occupation: Television presenter
- Partner: Hans Mahr
- Children: 2

Katja Katharina Burkard (born 21 April 1965) is a German television presenter.

== Career ==
After graduating from high school, Katja Burkard studied German studies and political science at the Konrad-Adenauer-Gymnasium Westerburg. Following a traineeship at the Bastei publishing house, she worked as an editor for "Goldene Gesundheit," the television production company "teuto Tele," and as a reporter for the RTL News editorial offices in Cologne (from Punkt 6 to RTL Nachtjournal).

Starting in the fall of 1995, she took turns hosting the weekend editions of RTL aktuell. Since 14 April 1997, she has been the main anchor of Punkt 12.

In 2000, she made a cameo appearance as a news anchor alongside Mark Keller in I Love You, Baby. She made another cameo appearance as a newswoman in Auf Herz und Nieren (Put Through its Paces) alongside Steffen Wink. In 2006, she also appeared in the docusoap Katjas härteste Jobs (Katja's Toughest Jobs) on RTL in 2006.

In August 2009, she was seen in Mein erstes Leben – Mich hat es schon einmal gegeben (My First Life – I Have Existed Before). The TV series concerns itself with life after death. In August 2010, the series was continued with three more editions on RTL. In 2011, Burkard appeared in the series Doctor's Diary. There she played as herself. From March to May 2015, she was a contestant on the RTL show Let's Dance. At Punkt 12, she has been reporting at irregular intervals since 2019 on alternative healing methods in her own reportage format Wenn die Schulmedizin nicht mehr weiter weiß (When Conventional Medicine No Longer Knows What to Do).

At the end of September 2019, she published her biography Wechseljahre? Keine Panik! (Menopause? Don't Panic!).

== Private life ==
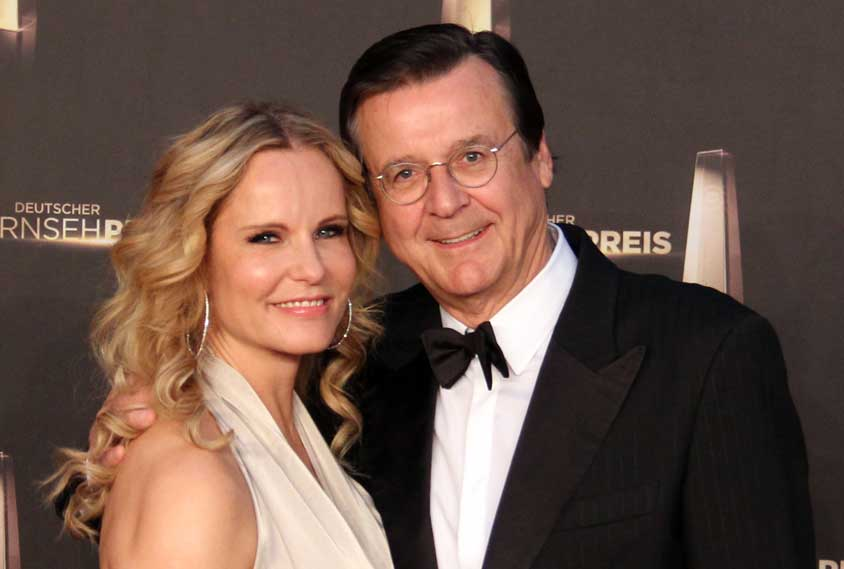
Burkard with partner Hans Mahr at the 2012 German Television Award

The daughter of a restaurateur, Burkard grew up with her sister, who is nine years older, in Höhn-Neuhochstein. Since 1998, she has been the partner of former RTL editor-in-chief Hans Mahr. They are the parents of two daughters (born in 2001 and 2007). The family lives in Cologne.

In February 2013, Katja Burkard published her first children's book Rundherum und hin und her – Zähneputzen ist nicht schwer (All Around and Back and Forth – Brushing Your Teeth Is Not Difficult). In addition, Katja Burkard is the patron of several organizations that advocate primarily for children's rights.

Burkard is known for her struggle with her lisp, in particular of the letter S. In a 2007 newspaper interview, she stated that she was not bothered by her speech impediment.

== Television appearances ==
=== Presenter ===
- 1995–1996: RTL aktuell (RTL)
- Since 1996: Punkt 12 (RTL)
- 2000: Life! - Die Lust zu leben (substituting for Birgit Schrowange)
- 2001: Erzähl doch mal. Kinder fragen – Prominente antworten
- 2002: Der Sonntags-Talk zur Formel 1
- 2003–2004: Life! - Die Lust zu leben
- 2006: Katjas härteste Jobs (RTL)
- 2010: Mein erstes Leben
- 2012: Anti-Aging – Die Formel für die ewige Jugend

=== Guest appearances ===
- 2000: I Love You, Baby (Kinofilm)
- 2007, 2008: Die ultimative Chart Show (RTL) (appeared in 2 episodes)
- 2011: Doctor's Diary (RTL)
- 2013: Es kann nur E1NEN geben (RTL)
- 2013: Lafer! Lichter! Lecker! (ZDF)
- 2015: Let's Dance (RTL) (candidate)
- seit 2016: Mario Barth deckt auf! (RTL) (reporter)
- 2016: Promi Shopping Queen (VOX) (candidate)
- 2016: Gute Zeiten, schlechte Zeiten (RTL)
- 2016: Paarduell (NDR) (candidate with partner Hans Mahr)
- 2017: Grill den Henssler (VOX) (candidate)
- 2019: Kölner Treff (WDR)
- 2019: NDR Talkshow (NDR)
- 2020: 5 gegen Jauch (RTL)
- 2021: Wer weiß denn sowas? (ARD)
