= Auf Herz und Nieren =

- Theatrical release poster
- Directed by: Thomas Jahn
- Screenplay by: Jürg Bränoli
- Produced by: Til Schweiger
- Starring: Steffen Wink; Niels-Bruno Schmidt; Martin Glade; Thierry van Werveke
- Cinematography: Peter von Haller
- Edited by: Thomas Jahn; Til Schweiger
- Music by: Fetisch Bergmann; Marco Meister
- Production companies: Mr. Brown Entertainment; Senator Film Produktion
- Distributed by: Warner Bros. Pictures
- Release dates: 17 December 2001 (Kinofest Lünen); 29 August 2002 (Germany)
- Running time: 98 minutes
- Country: Germany
- Language: German
- Box office: $199,100

Auf Herz und Nieren is a 2001 German comedy film directed by Thomas Jahn and produced by Til Schweiger. The film stars Steffen Wink, Niels-Bruno Schmidt, Martin Glade and Thierry van Werveke. It features cameo appearances from Katja Burkard, Xavier Naidoo and Burt Reynolds.

The film was released in Germany on 29 August 2002 by Warner Bros. Pictures.

== Cast ==
- Steffen Wink as Rico
- Niels-Bruno Schmidt as Dave
- Martin Glade as Sigi
- Thierry van Werveke as Glotze
- Udo Kier as Doc
- Huub Stapel as Nemeth
- Jochen Nickel as Fialka
- Samuel Finzi as Dr. Korda
- Mark Kuhn as Kaposi
- Oscar Ortega Sánchez as Lopez
- Axel Schulz as Hanuszka
- Xavier Naidoo as Shalaman
- Burt Reynolds as Banko
