= Burkhard Driest =

German actor (1939–2020)

- Born: 28 April 1939; Stettin, Free State of Prussia, Germany
- Died: 27 February 2020 (aged 80); Berlin, Germany
- Occupations: Actor; writer; director
- Awards: Oldenburg International Film Festival (2019)

Burkhard Driest ([ˈbʊʁkhaʁt ˈdʁiːst]; 28 April 1939 – 27 February 2020) was a German actor, writer and director, known for his acting work in Sam Peckinpah's Cross of Iron and Rainer Werner Fassbinder's Querelle. He also wrote novels and screenplays.

== Life ==
Driest was born in Stettin, Germany (now Poland), on 28 April 1939, the son of a graduate economist and a piano teacher. At the end of World War II, the family fled to Peine, Lower Saxony. His parents were divorced in 1950. The children stayed with the mother, who moved to Göttingen, but he returned to his father in 1957. In an anthology from 1995, Driest described his memories of childhood and adolescence under the title Halbstark in Peine. He was dismissed from school four times but achieved the Abitur as the third-best of that year.

Driest studied law for ten semesters in Kiel, Berlin and Göttingen. On 11 May 1965, three weeks before his oral law examination, he robbed the savings bank (German: Sparkasse) in Burgdorf. He was sentenced to five years in prison and released after three years and four months. He then worked in the port of Hamburg, and as a waiter and taxi driver in London. He published his first novel, Die Verrohung des Franz Blum (The brutalization of Franz Blum), with autobiographical aspects, in 1974. He wrote the screenplay for a 1974 film of the same name, directed by Reinhard Hauff, with Jürgen Prochnow in the title role, and Driest in a minor role. Peter Zadek invited him to play the role of Stanley Kowalski in Endstation Sehnsucht (A Streetcar Named Desire) by Tennessee Williams, with Rosel Zech as Blanche, at the Schauspielhaus Bochum. The same year, Driest was a guest on Dietmar Schönherr's talk show, with Romy Schneider and Bubi Scholz. During this live appearance, Schneider touched Driest's arm, saying "Sie gefallen mir! Sie gefallen mir sehr!" (I like you! I like you a lot!) in words from a recent popular film in which Schneider had starred. The incident won him increased attention.

Driest worked with directors such as Werner Herzog (for Stroszek), Sam Peckinpah (for Cross of Iron), and Reinhard Hauff on four projects. He wrote together with Lukas Heller the script for the satire Son of Hitler, which premiered in 1978 but was a failure with critics and the audience.

Driest wrote versions of the screenplay for Rainer Werner Fassbinder's final film, Querelle, but they were not accepted. He played the role of Mario, alongside Jeanne Moreau and Brad Davis. Driest wrote texts for the Peter Zadek's musical Andi and revue Falco meets Amadeus at the Theater des Westens. Driest lived in Switzerland after 1983, working as an actor and producer. In 1984, he made his debut as a film director, with Anna's Mother. He wrote a detective novel published in 2003 and also worked as an artist.

== Personal life ==
Driest was married three times. His daughter is the writer Johanna Driest. He died in Berlin on 27 February 2020 at age 80 after a long illness.

== Filmography ==
Driest worked in films as an actor, screenwriter, director and producer, including:

As actor

- 1974: Die Verrohung des Franz Blum – Walter 'Tiger' Kuul
- 1976: Der Kommissar: Der Held des Tages (TV series episode) – Hartmut Stimmel
- 1977: Cross of Iron – Schütze Maag
- 1977: Stroszek – Souteneur
- 1978: Son of Hitler – Gerd Müller
- 1980: Slow Attack – Nick Dellmann
- 1982: Querelle – Mario
- 1983: The Roaring Fifties – Major Assimov
- 1984: Die Story
- 1984: Der Havarist – Sterling Hayden
- 1984: Smaragd – Klopfer Martin
- 1985: Kalt in Kolumbien
- 1986: Kir Royal (TV series, 1 episode) – Schläger
- 1987: Taxi nach Kairo – 1. Polizist
- 1990: Ein Fall für zwei: Madonna (TV series episode) – Malik
- 1992: Den demokratiske terroristen – Horst
- 1997: Der Ausbruch (TV film) – Peter Stolzek
- 1998: Night Time – Lasinger
- 2000: I Love You, Baby – Decker
- 2003: Hamlet_X – Observer
- 2009: Lasko – Die Faust Gottes (TV series, 4 episodes) – Abt Patrizius
- 2011: Toni Costa: Kommissar auf Ibiza – Der rote Regen (TV series episode) – El Cubano (final film role)

As screenwriter

- 1974: Die Verrohung des Franz Blum, script based on his own novel of the same name
- 1978: Son of Hitler
- 1980: Slow Attack
- 1982: Querelle
- 1984: Anna's Mother

As director

- 1984: Anna's Mother

As producer

- 1978: Son of Hitler
- 1982: Querelle

== Other works ==
Works by Driest are held by the German National Library, including:

Novels

- 1974: Die Verrohung des Franz Blum, Rowohlt, Reinbek
- 1981: Mann ohne Schatten
- 1997: Sanfte Morde
- 2003: Der rote Regen
- 2005: Liebestod
- 2006: Brennende Schuld
- 2008: Sommernachtsmord
- 2010: Küchenkunst, LangenMüller, Munchen
- 2011: Die Maikäfer und der Krieg (Roman), LangenMüller, München
