= Mark Keller (actor) =

German actor

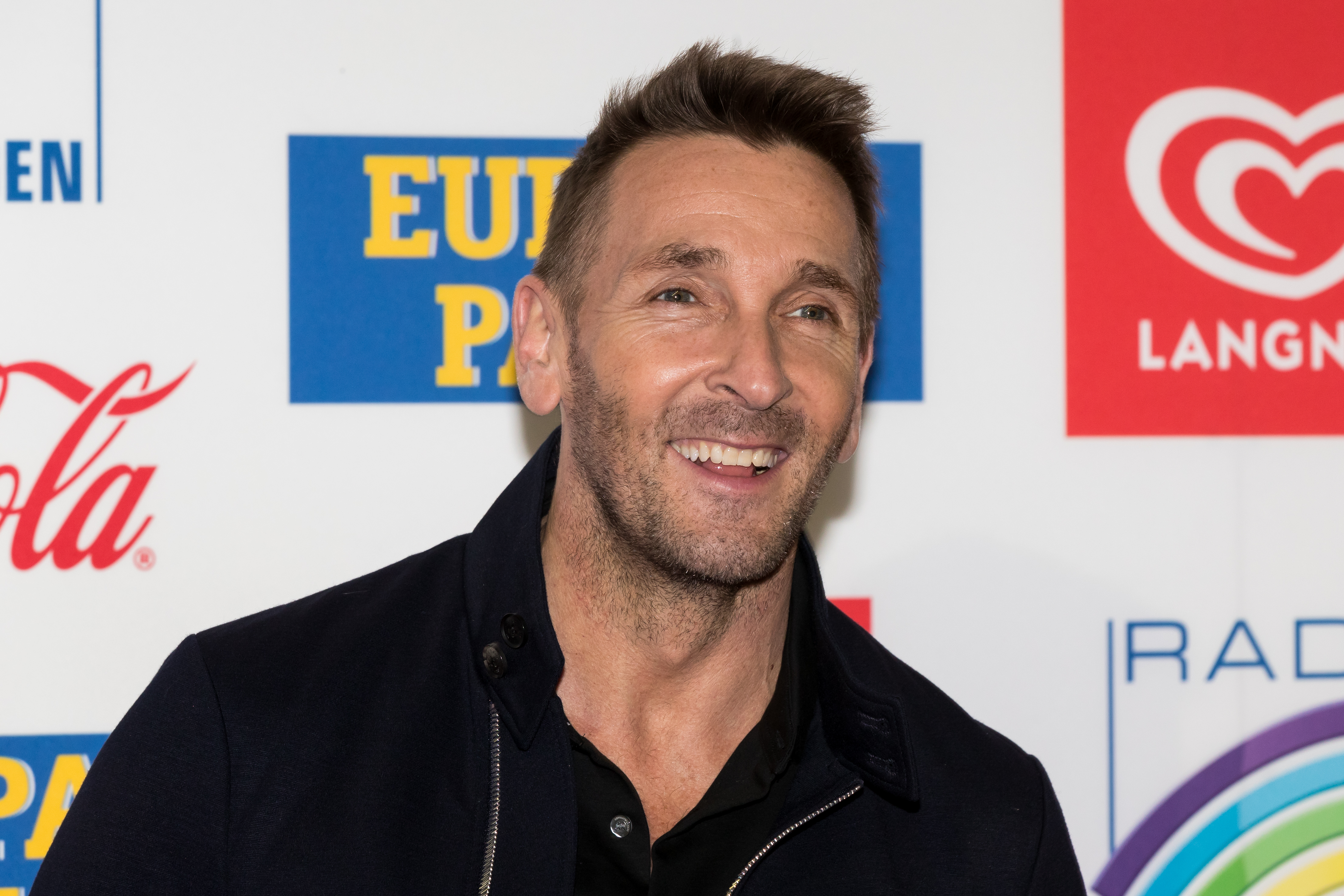
- Keller in 2018
- Born: 5 May 1965 (age 61); Überlingen, West Germany
- Occupation: Actor
- Years active: 1992-present

Mark Keller (born 5 May 1965) is a German actor. He is best known as detective André Fux in Alarm für Cobra 11 – Die Autobahnpolizei. and Dr. Alexander Kahnweiler in the 2008 version Der Bergdoktor

== Personal life ==
Keller has two sons with wife Tülin, Aaron Keller and Joshua Keller, who are both actors. He lives on Lake Constance, Germany.

== Selected filmography ==
Year	Title	Role	Notes
1997 - 1999 **2013	Alarm for Cobra 11 - The Hightway Police	André Fux	**In 2013, he made a guest appearance in the ninth episode of season 18, following a 14-year absence
2000	I Love You, Baby	Peter	
2005	Barfuss		
2008	1½ Knights – In Search of the Ravishing Princess Herzelinde	Prince Gustav	
since 2008	Der Bergdoktor	Dr. Alexander Kahnweiler	
