= I Love You, Baby (2000 film) =

- Promotional release poster
- Directed by: Nick Lyon
- Written by: Ron Peer
- Produced by: Volker Hahn; Ica Souvignier; Michael Souvignier
- Starring: Jasmin Gerat; Mark Keller; Maximilian Schell; Burkhard Driest
- Cinematography: Ekkehart Pollack
- Edited by: Vera Theden
- Music by: Reinhold Hill
- Production companies: Two Guys and a Girl Entertainment Productions; Warner Bros. Film Gmbh
- Distributed by: Warner Bros.
- Release date: 20 April 2000
- Running time: 103 minutes
- Country: Germany
- Language: German

I Love You, Baby is a 2000 German action thriller film directed by Nick Lyon with Jasmin Gerat, Mark Keller, Maximilian Schell and Burkhard Driest in the lead.

== Synopsis ==
The film revolves around two con partners named Peter and Gwen who plan to steal money from the millionaire Walter Ekland by Peter posing as his long lost son and Gwen as Peter's wife who is undergoing treatment for cancer. Their plan gets in jeopardy when a detective named Decker, who knows their identities, decides to get a share of the money.

== Cast ==
- Jasmin Gerat as Gwen
- Mark Keller as Peter
- Maximilian Schell as Walter Ekland
- Burkhard Driest as Decker
- Katja Burkard as Fernsehsprecherin
- Prince Hughes as Real Decker
- Mario Irrek as Richie Rich
- Wolfram Kons as Fernsehsprecher
- Lorenzo Bassa Mestre as Taxifahrer
- Patrizia Moresco as Maria
- Ralph Morgenstern as Sickenberger
- Peter Rappenglück as Cookie
- Pierre Shrady as Barkeeper
- Carlo Thränhardt as Chauffeur

== Reception ==
I Love You, Baby was met with mixed reviews. Cineclub positively reviewed Nick Lyon's directorial approach. Some appreciated the picturesque locales and the screenplay. However, Schnitt gave it a negative review, calling it as a low grade television movie with numerous wide shots that actually kills the cinema audience.
