= Der Bergdoktor (2008 TV series) =

German medical drama television series

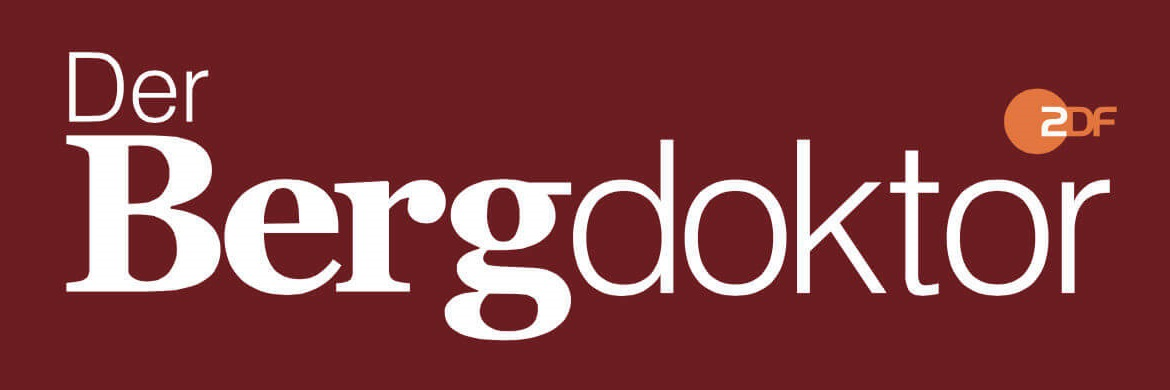
- Logo
- Genre: Medical drama
- Starring: Hans Sigl; Heiko Ruprecht; Ronja Forcher; Natalie O'Hara; Mark Keller; Monika Baumgartner; Rebecca Immanuel; Simone Hanselmann
- Opening theme: "Patience" by Take That
- Composers: Robert Schulte-Hemming; Jens Langbein
- Countries of origin: Austria; Germany
- Original language: German
- No. of seasons: 19
- No. of episodes: 180

Production
- Producer: Thomas Bretschneider
- Running time: 45 minutes / 90 minutes
- Production company: Neue Deutsche Filmgesellschaft

Original release
- Network: ZDF; ORF
- Release: 6 February 2008

Der Bergdoktor is a remake of the 1990s German-Austrian medical drama television series Der Bergdoktor, broadcast since 6 February 2008.

== Cast and characters ==
- Hans Sigl as Dr. Martin Gruber
- Heiko Ruprecht as Hans Gruber
- Ronja Forcher as Lilli Gruber
- Natalie O'Hara as Susanne Dreiseitl
- Mark Keller as Dr. Alexander Kahnweiler
- Monika Baumgartner as Elisabeth Gruber
- Rebecca Immanuel as Dr. Vera Fendrich
- Simone Hanselmann as Franziska Hochstetter

== See also ==
- List of German television series
