= Steffen Wink =

German actor

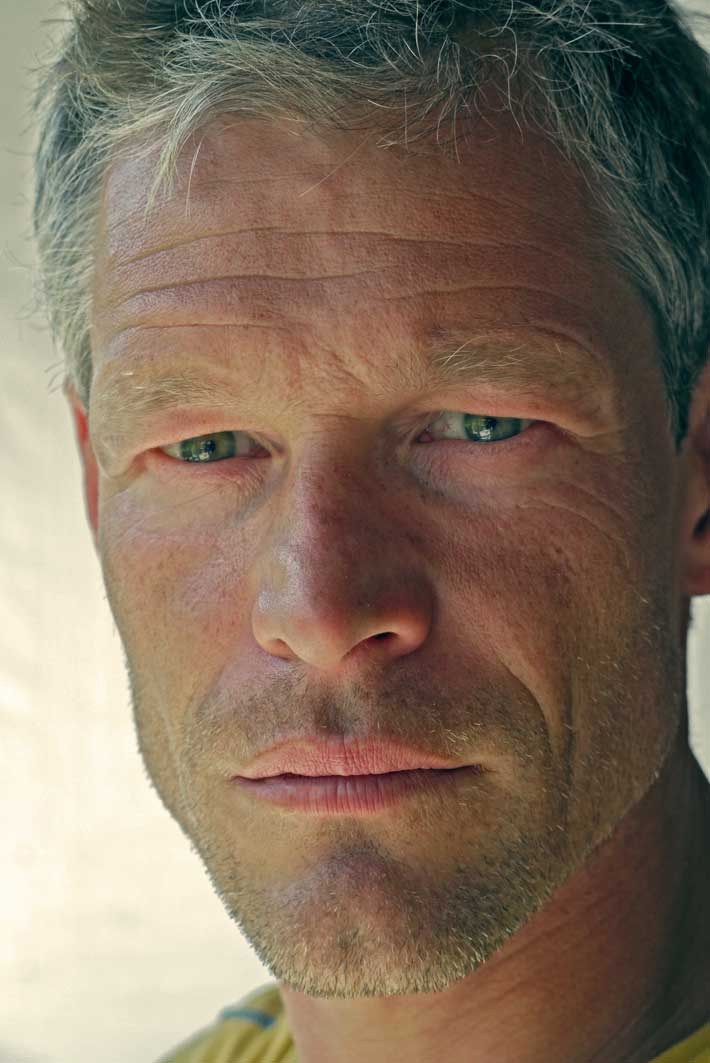
- Born: 5 July 1967 (age 58); Pirmasens, West Germany
- Occupation: Actor
- Years active: 1991-present
- Spouse: Genoveva Mayer

Steffen Wink (born 5 July 1967) is a German actor. He has appeared in more than seventy films since 1991.

== Selected filmography ==
Film
| Year | Title | Role | Notes |
|---|---|---|---|
| 1994 | Simply Love | Thommy | |
| 1996 | Maja | David Andersen | TV film |
| 1997 | A Rat's Tale | Assistant Nick McRafferty | |
| 1998 | Am I Beautiful? | Klaus | |
| 1998 | Rhapsody in Blood | Nick Welte | TV film |
| 1998 | Kai Rabe gegen die Vatikankiller | Kai Rabe | |
| 1999 | The Millennium Disaster: Computer Crash 2000 | Thomas Rasch | TV film |
| 2001 | Auf Herz und Nieren | Rico | |
| 2005 | Barfuss | Viktor Keller | |

TV series
| Year | Title | Role | Notes |
|---|---|---|---|
| 2000 | Les Misérables | Enjolras | |
