= Der Bergdoktor (1992 TV series) =

German-Austrian medical drama

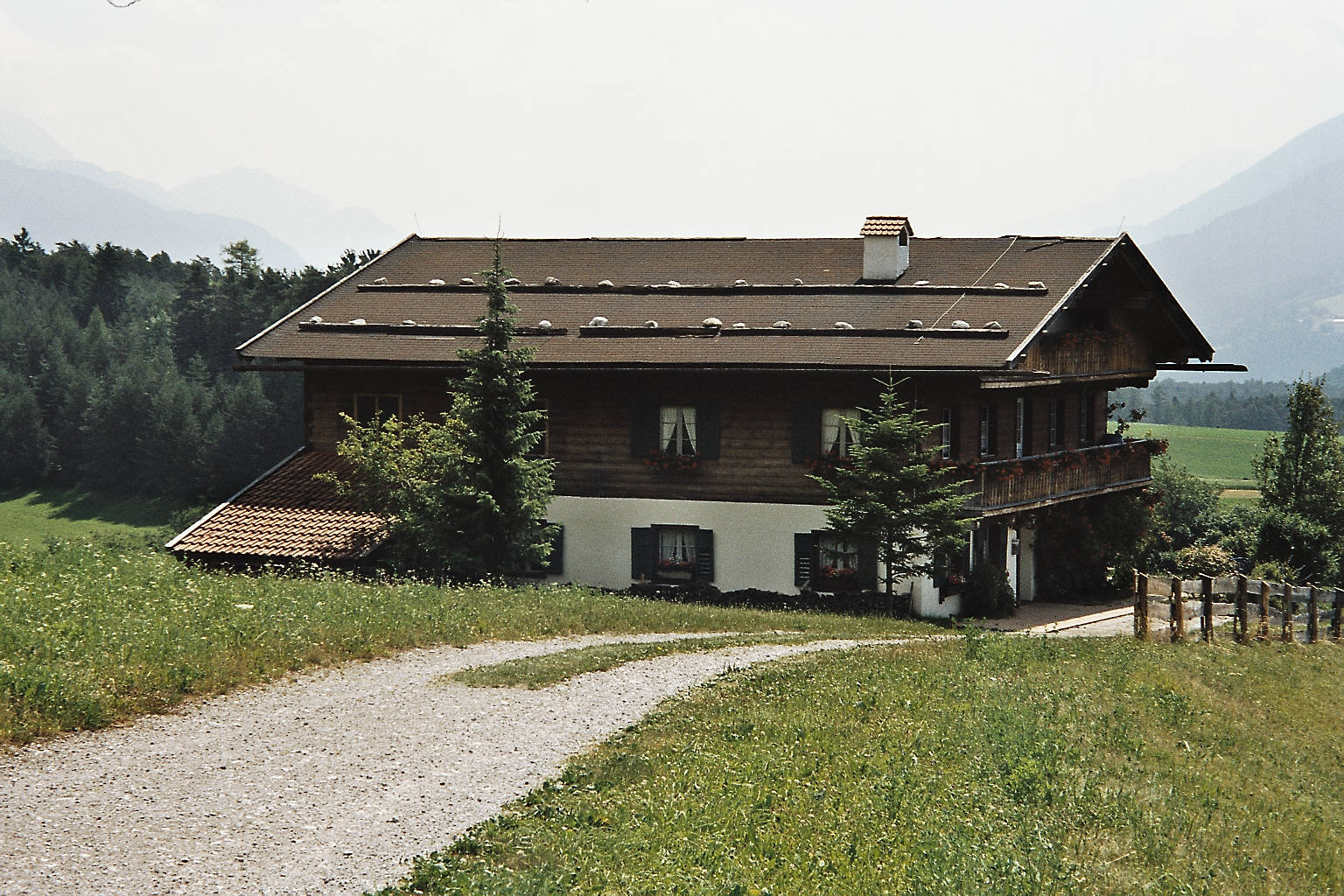
- Starring: Gerhart Lippert
- Country of origin: Germany

Der Bergdoktor is a German-Austrian medical drama television series, broadcast in 96 episodes between 1992 and 1997. The series is set in the fictional town of Sonnenstein in Tyrol; the real filming location is Wildermieming.

== See also ==
- List of German television series
- Der Bergdoktor
