= Rainbow Reel Tokyo =

LGBTQ film festival in Japan

Coordinates: 35°41′N 139°46′E

- Location: Tokyo, Japan
- Predecessor: Tokyo International Queer Film Festival (TIQFF)
- Founded: 1992
- Hosted by: Spiral Hall, Tokyo
- Festival date: July; Annual
- Language: International
- Website: Official website

Rainbow Reel Tokyo (Japanese: レインボー・リール東京 Reinbō rīru Tōkyō), until 2016 known as Tokyo International Lesbian & Gay Film Festival (Japanese: 東京国際レズビアン&ゲイ映画祭 Tōkyō kokusai rezubian to gei eigasai), also known by the acronym TILGFF, is an international film festival for LGBT audiences, held annually in Tokyo, the capital city of Japan.

The Festival was established in 1992 and was held at Nakano Sun Plaza, 6th Floor (中野サンプラザ6F研修室). The next three were held at Kichijōji Baus Theater (吉祥寺バウスシアター). Since 1996, the Festival has been held in July at Spiral Hall in the Aoyama neighborhood of Tokyo.

The 23rd Tokyo International Lesbian & Gay Film Festival was held July 12~21, 2014, at Eurospace in Shibuya, and Spiral Hall in Aoyama.

== Awards ==
=== Rainbow Reel Competition ===
The Rainbow Reel Competition (レインボー・リール・コンペティション) began in 1995 as an annual screening of Japanese short films to encourage production of LGBT-themed films. The audience selects a favorite film and the director is awarded the Grand Prix Rainbow Reel Award (レインボー・リール賞（グランプリ）), currently a ¥100,000 prize ($1000 US).

Grand Prix Rainbow Reel Award winners

- 4th Festival (1995) –
- 5th Festival (1996) –
- 6th Festival (1997) –
- 7th Festival (1998) – We Are Transgenders (We Are Transgenders ～性別を超えて、自分らしく生きる～); director: Lulu Ogawa (尾川ルル)
- 8th Festival (1999) –
- 9th Festival (2000) –
- 10th Festival (2001) –
- 11th Festival (2002) –
- 12th Festival (2003) –
- 13th Festival (2004) –
- 14th Festival (2005) – "Stereotype Company" (「ヘテロ薬」) (2005); director: Team "Stereotype Company" (ヘテロ薬制作委員会)
- 15th Festival (2006) – Somewhere in Tokyo (東京のどこかで) (2006); director: Kenta Tatenai (タテナイケンタ)
- 16th Festival (2007) – A Tulip of Violet (2007); director: Yūmi Andō (安藤優美)
- 17th Festival (2008) – San-Kaku (△サンカク) (2008); director: Kazuki Watanabe (渡辺一樹)
- 18th Festival (2009) – "Avec mon copain / With my Boyfriend; director : Antonio de Oliveira; Producer : Sanae Kikuchi (Tomoé films)
- 19th Festival (2010) – Jellyfish Boy (くらげくん) (2009); director: Shō Kataoka (片岡翔)
- 20th Festival (2011) –
- 21st Festival (2012) – Tsuyako (2011); director: Mitsuyo Miyazaki (宮崎光代)
- 22nd Festival (2013) –
- 23rd Festival (2014) – The Other Side of a Smiling Face (笑顔の向こう側) (2013); director: Yoshiaki Sajima (佐島由昭)
- 24th Festival (2015) – From the Bottom of the Vortex (私は渦の底から) (2015); director: Kozue Nomoto (野本梢)
- 25th Festival (2016) –
- 26th Festival (2017) –
- 27th Festival (2018) – Old Narcissus (老ナルキソス); director: Tsuyoshi Shōji (東海林毅)
- 28th Festival (2019) –

=== Special Jury Award ===
The Special Jury Award (審査員特別賞 Shinsa-in tokubetsu shō), first given in 2008, is an outstanding Japanese film selected by a guest director.

Special Jury Award winners

- 17th Festival (2008) – When I Become Silent (わたしが沈黙するとき) (2007); director: Hyōe Yamamoto (山本兵衛)

== Festival programs ==
=== 1st Festival (1992) ===
Festival reference

| English title | Original title | Year | Country | Director(s) | Notes |
|---|---|---|---|---|---|
| AIDS March on Washington | | 1988 | US | Los Angeles Project | documentary |
| The Best of Out | | 1985 | US | London Project | documentary |
| Forbidden Love | Zapovězená láska | 1990 | Czechoslovakia | Vladislav Kvasnička | |
| Gay Games 2 | | 1986 | US | San Francisco Sports Project | documentary |
| Gay Movement in Japan | | 1986 | Japan | ILGA Japan Video Project | documentary |
| Nocturne | | 1990 | UK | Joy Chamberlain | |
| OCCUR Takes Its Case to Court | OCCUR 東京同性愛裁判 | 1992 | Japan | OCCUR Video Project | documentary of the OCCUR case Festival title: OCCUR Takes Its ...... to Court |
| Orientations | | 1986 | Canada | Richard Fung | |
| Over Our Dead Bodies | | 1991 | UK | Stuart Marshall | |
| Revolutions Happen Like Refrains in a Song | | 1988 | Philippines | Nick Deocampo | |
| We Were One Man | Nous étions un seul homme | 1978 | France | Philippe Vallois | |
| Because the Dawn | | 1988 | US | Amy Goldstein | short film, 40 minutes |
| The Battle of Tuntenhaus | | 1991 | UK | Juliet Bashore | short film, 24 minutes |
| Bolo! Bolo! | | 1991 | Canada | Gita Saxena; Ian Iqbal Rashid | short film, 30 minutes |
| Exposure | | 1990 | Canada | Michelle Mohabeer | short film, 8 minutes |
| Fighting Chance | | 1990 | Canada | Richard Fung | short film, 29 minutes |
| Honored by the Moon | | 1989 | US | Mona Smith | documentary short, 15 minutes |
| Outtakes | | 1989 | US | John Goth | short film, 13 minutes |
| Ten Cents a Dance: Parallax | | 1985 | Canada | Midi Onodera | short film, 30 minutes |
| We Were Everywhere | | 1987 | Sweden | Bill Sure | short film, 28 minutes |
| The White Line Dance; Flowing Heart | | 1991; 1992 | Thailand | John Goth | short film, 38 minutes |
| Women of Gold | | 1990 | US | Eileen Lee; Marilyn Abbink | short film, 30 minutes |

=== 2nd Festival (1993) ===
Festival reference

| English title | Original title | Year | Country | Director(s) | Notes |
|---|---|---|---|---|---|
| Before Stonewall | | 1984 | US | Robert Rosenberg; Greta Schiller | documentary |
| Bright Eyes | | 1986 | UK | Stuart Marshall | documentary |
| Dear My Friends | ディアマイフレンズ | 1992 | Japan | | documentary; Visual AIDS Tokyo |
| Fun Down There | | 1989 | US | Roger Stigliano | |
| Love and Marriage | | | UK | Susan Ardill | |
| The Lost Language of Cranes | | 1991 | UK | Nigel Finch | TV film |
| Minoru & Me | ミノルと私 Minoru to watashi | 1992 | UK | Toichi Nakata | |
| North of Vortex | | 1991 | UK/Greece | Constantine Giannaris | |
| Okoge | おこげ | 1992 | Japan | Takehiro Nakajima (中島丈博) | |
| On Guard | | 1984 | Australia | Susan Lambert | |
| The Salt Mines | | 1990 | US | Susana Aikin; Carlos Aparicio | |
| Together Alone | | 1991 | US | P. J. Castellaneta | |
| Woman Like Us (??) | Japanese title: エマとダイアナ | | UK | | |
| Among Good Christian Peoples | | 1991 | US | Catherine Saalfield; Jacqueline Woodson | documentary short, 30 minutes |
| Anthem | | 1991 | US | Marlon Riggs | short film, 8 minutes |
| Aura | | 1992 | US | Ming-Yuen S. Ma | short film, 7 minutes |
| Because This Is About Love | | 1991 | US | Shu Lee Ong | short film, 30 minutes |
| Caught Looking | | 1991 | UK | Constantine Giannaris | short film, 35 minutes |
| Gay Sera Sera | | 1992 | UK | Susan Ardill | short film, 23 minutes |
| Guess Who's Coming to Dinner | | 1991 | UK | Richard Kwietniowski | short film, 25 minutes |
| Home Sweet Home | | 1991 | UK | Rosalind Haber | short film, 17 minutes |
| If She Grows Up Gay | | 1983 | US | Karen Sloe | short film, 23 minutes |
| I Got This Way From Kissin' Girls | | 1990 | US | Julie Battler | short film, 8 minutes |
| I Never Danced the Way Girls Were Supposed To | | 1992 | US | Dawn Suggs | short film, 8 minutes |
| Irome | 色目 Irome | 1992 | Japan | Hiroyuki Ōki (大木裕之) | short film, 8 minutes; Festival Title: Iro-Me |
| Khush | | 1991 | UK | Pratibha Parmar | short film, 24 minutes |
| L Is for the Way You Look | | 1991 | US | Jean Carlomusto | short film, 24 minutes |
| Non, Je Ne Regrette Rien (No Regret) | | 1992 | US | Marlon Riggs | short film, 35 minutes |
| Red Lolita | | 1989 | US | Gloria Toyunpark | short film, 6 minutes |
| Relax | | 1991 | UK | Chris Newby | short film, 25 minutes |
| Rosebud | | 1992 | UK | Cheryl Farthing | short film, 14 minutes |
| RSVP | | 1991 | Canada | Laurie Lynd | short film, 23 minutes |
| Sandra's Garden | | 1991 | Canada | Bonnie Dickson | short film, 34 minutes |
| She Don't Fade | | 1991 | US | Cheryl Dunye | short film, 24 minutes |
| Target Bush | | 1991 | US | | short film, 10 minutes; Diva TV |
| Tell Me No Lies | | 1992 | UK | Neil Hunter | short film, 29 minutes |
| Tell Me Why: The Epistemology of Disco | | 1991 | Canada | John Di Stefano | short film, 24 minutes |
| They Are Lost to Vision Altogether | | 1989 | US | Tom Colin | short film, 13 minutes |
| Two Marches | | 1991 | US | Jim Hubbard | short film, 9 minutes |
| War on Lesbians | | 1992 | US | Jane Cotis | short film, 32 minutes |

=== 3rd Festival (1994) ===
Festival reference

| English title | Original title | Year | Country | Director(s) | Notes |
|---|---|---|---|---|---|
| Forbidden Love: The Unashamed Stories of Lesbian Lives | | 1992 | Canada | Aerlyn Weissman; Lynne Fernie | documentary; Festival title Forbidden Love |
| Grief | | 1993 | US | Richard Glatzer | |
| In the Best Interests of the Children | | 1977 | US | Frances Reid; Elizabeth Stevens; Cathy Zheutlin | documentary |
| Prince in Hell | Prinz in Hölleland | 1993 | Germany | Michael Stock | |
| A Secret Evening | 夕辺の秘密 Yūbe no himitsu | 1989 | Japan | Ryōsuke Hashiguchi | Festival title: Secret in the Evening |
| After the Break | | 1992 | US | Mary Guzmán | short film, 13 minutes |
| Because the Dawn | | 1988 | US | Amy Goldstein | short film, 40 minutes |
| Both | | 1993 | US | Vic De La Rosa | short film, 8 minutes |
| A Certain Grace | | 1992 | US | Sandra Nettelbeck | short film, 40 minutes |
| The Fairy Who Didn't Want to Be a Fairy Anymore | | 1992 | Canada | Laurie Lynd | short film, 17 minutes |
| Harold and Hiroshi | | 1989 | US | Ed Askinazi | short film, 38 minutes |
| I Need a Man Like You to Make My Dreams Come True | | 1986 | Canada | Kalli Paakspuu; Daria Stermac | short film, 24 minutes |
| Ifé | | 1993 | US | Len Keller | short film, 5 minutes |
| In Plain View | | 1993 | France/US | Felix Olivier | short film, 25 minutes |
| Just Because of Who We Are | | 1986 | US | Hermadia Collective | short film, 28 minutes |
| The Lesbian Impress Card | | 1990 | US | Ingrid Wilhite | short film, 3 minutes |
| Life on Earth As I Know It | | 1989 | Australia | Penny McDonald | short film, 8 minutes |
| Loverville | | 1992 | US | Bohdan Zachary | short film, 6 minutes |
| My Life | Ma vie | 1992 | Canada | Denis Langlois | short film, 21 minutes |
| Pool Days | | 1993 | US | Brian Sloan | short film, 27 minutes |
| Public Opinion | | 1993 | US | Ted Dvoracek | short film, 24 minutes |
| Saito-kun & Yoshinaga-kun | シリーズ・斉藤君と吉永君 Shirīzu・Saitō-kun to Yoshinaga-kun | 1991 | Japan | Yoshio Takanori (吉雄孝紀) | short film, 20 minutes |
| Thick Lips Thin Lips | | 1994 | Canada | Paul Lee | short film, 6 minutes |
| Things We Said Today | | 1992 | US | John Miller-Monzon | short film, 34 minutes |
| Twenty-two | | 1993 | US | Gene Bernard | short film, 10 minutes |
| We Want Things Like These | 僕たちこんなモノが欲しい!! Bokutachi konna mono ga hoshii!! | 1993 | Japan | | short film, 7 minutes; NHK BS program |
| The Weight of Oceans | | 1992 | US | John Binninger | short film, 7 minutes |

=== 4th Festival (1995) ===
Festival reference

| English title | Original title | Year | Country | Director(s) | Notes |
|---|---|---|---|---|---|
| The Lesbian Avengers Eat Fire Too | | 1993 | US | Janet Baus; Su Friedrich | documentary; Festival title: Lesbian Avengers |
| Totally F***ed Up | | 1993 | US | Gregg Araki | |
| World and Time Enough | | 1994 | US | Eric Mueller | |
| Your Heart Is All Mine | Mein ist dein ganzes Herz | 1992 | Germany | Elke Götz | |
| 100 Seconds with Sasha | | 1994 | US | Hans Gelke | short film, 1.5 minutes |
| 1993 West Coast Retreat | | 1994 | US | Marilyn Abbink; Heidi Li; Marie Kyoko Morohoshi | documentary short, 22 minutes presented by The Asian Pacific Lesbian & Bisexual Women's Network |
| Beyond/Body/Memory | | 1993 | Canada | Neesha Dosanjh | short film, 5 minutes |
| Billy Turner's Secret | | 1991 | US | Michael Mayson | short film, 30 minutes |
| Carmelita Tropicana: Your Kunst Is Your Waffen | | 1994 | US | Ela Troyano | short film, 30 minutes; Festival title: Carmelita Tropicana |
| Closets Are for Clothes | Closets Are for Clothes | 1995 | Japan | Dezu | short film, 21 minutes |
| Cruel | | 1994 | US | Desi Del Valle | short film, 20 minutes |
| The Dead Boys' Club | | 1992 | US | Mark Christopher | short film, 25 minutes |
| Death in Venice, CA | | 1994 | US | P. David Ebersole | short film, 30 minutes |
| Deep Sea Diving at Night, With a Camera | | 1994 | US | Elsa Eder | short film, 8 minutes |
| Elevation | | 1989 | Australia | Stephen Cummins | short film, 11 minutes |
| Flames of Passion | | 1989 | UK | Richard Kwietniowski | short film, 18 minutes |
| A Friend of Dorothy | | 1994 | US | Raoul O'Connell | short film, 26 minutes |
| Her Sweetness Lingers | | 1994 | Canada | Shani Mootoo | short film, 12 minutes |
| Ketchup-man | ケチャップマン | | Japan | Daisuke Aiba (愛場大介) | short film, 10 minutes |
| The Last Stop | | 1994 | UK | Ross Dinwiddy; Mark Adams | short film, 25 minutes |
| Los dos Jorges | | 1993 | US | Nelson Nazario | short film, 11 minutes |
| The Lost Heart | The Lost Heart | 1993 | Germany | Hilou Vogelmann | short film, 25 minutes |
| Lost in the Garden | Lost in the Garden | | Japan | Tsuyoshi Shōji (東海林毅) | short film, 20 minutes |
| The Love Thang Trilogy: 1. Just a Love Thang; 2. Skydyking; 3. Eating Mango | | 1994 | US | Mari Keiko Gonzales | short film, 12 minutes |
| Mister Sisters | | 1994 | US | Ingrid Wilhite | short film, 12 minutes |
| Outlaw | | 1994 | US | Alisa Lebow | short film, 27 minutes |
| The Reason I Quit Being a Hustler | 僕がウリセンをやめた理由 Boku ga urisen wo yameta riyū | 1996 | Japan | Satoshi Sugano (菅野哲史) | short film, 25 minutes; Festival title: The Reason I Quit Being Hustler |
| Sex Bowl | | 1994 | US | Shu Lea Cheang | short film, 7 minutes |
| Sex Fish | | 1993 | US | Shu Lea Cheang; E.T. Baby Maniac | short film, 6 minutes |
| Song of the Goddess | 似是故人來 | 1993 | Hong Kong | Ellen Pau (鮑靄倫) | short film, 7 minutes |
| Summer | Summer | 1995 | Japan | Takako Tajiri (田尻孝子) | short film, 6 minutes |
| Tomboy | | 1994 | US | Dawn Logsdon | documentary short, 17 minutes |
| Wicked Radiance | Sinar Durjana | 1992 | US | Azian Nurudin | short film, 5 minutes; Malay language film |

=== 5th Festival (1996) ===
Festival reference

| English title | Original title | Year | Country | Director(s) | Notes |
|---|---|---|---|---|---|
| Costa Brava | | 1995 | Spain | Marta Balletbò-Coll | |
| Desperate Remedies | | 1992 | New Zealand | Stewart Main; Peter Wells | |
| Dream Girls | | 1993 | UK | Jano Williams; Kim Longinotto | documentary |
| Jeffrey | | 1995 | US | Christopher Ashley | |
| Madagascar Skin | | 1995 | UK | Chris Newby | |
| Man of the Year | | 1995 | US | Dirk Shafer | mockumentary |
| Nitrate Kisses | | 1992 | US | Barbara Hammer | |
| A Place in the Sun | Μια Θέση στον Ήλιο | 1994 | UK/Greece | Constantine Giannaris | |
| Shinjuku Boys | | 1995 | UK | Jano Williams; Kim Longinotto | documentary |
| Thin Ice – Passion on the Pink Rink | | 1994 | UK | Fiona Cunningham-Reid | |
| Wigstock: The Movie | | 1994 | US | Barry Shils | documentary |
| Alkali, Iowa | | 1995 | US | Mark Christopher | short film, 17 minutes; see Boys Life 2 |
| Asian & Pacific Islander Lesbian & Bisexual Network | | 1996 | US | Kris Lee | short film, 4 minutes |
| The Asian Heat in Me | | 1995 | US | Kimberly SaRee Tomes | short film, 1.5 minutes |
| Change | | 1995 | Ireland | Ger Philpott | short film, 13 minutes |
| Hindustan | | 1995 | US | Gita Reddy; David Dasharath Kalal | music video, 3 minutes |
| Junky Punky Girlz | | 1995 | US | Nisha Ganatra | short film, 12 minutes |
| Le Ravin | Le Ravin | 1995 | France | Catherine Klein | short film, 20 minutes |
| Les Bienheureuses | Les Bienheureuses | 1991 | France | Nicole Blanchon | short film, 12 minutes |
| Lick | | 1995 | US | Hima B. Eliza O. Barrios | short film, 10 minutes |
| L'île d'Emain | L'île d'Emain | 1990 | France | Marcelle Thirache | short film, 6 minutes |
| Mirto | Mirto | 1994 | Italy | Giampaolo Marzi | short film, 12 minutes |
| My Polish Waiter | | 1995 | US | Terracino | short film, 12 minutes |
| Orpheus: The Day Before | Orfeo, il giorno prima | 1994 | Italy | Giovanni Minerba | short film, 12 minutes |
| Porcaria | | 1995 | Canada | Filipe Paulo | short film, 35 minutes |
| Regarde-moi | Regarde-moi | 1993 | France | Elisabeth Aubert | short film, 8.5 minutes |
| Regarde-moi | Regarde-moi | 1995 | France | Beatrice Cordon | short film, 3.5 minutes |
| Reservaat | Reservaat | 1988 | Netherlands | Clara von Gool | short film, 7 minutes |
| Sexe, Thyme | Sexe – Thym | 1994 | France | Nathalie Harran | short film, 1 minute |
| Shades of Grey | | 1995 | US | Madeleine Lim | short film, 7 minutes |
| Telecopines | Telecopines | 1995 | France | Sophie Rajzman | short film, 5 minutes |
| Trevor | | 1994 | US | Peggy Rajski | short film, 18 minutes |
| The Trongouinoscope | Le Trongouinoscope | 1995 | France | Catherine Letienne | short film, 5 minutes |
| Twilight of the Gods | | 1995 | New Zealand | Stewart Main | short film, 15 minutes |
| X-Girl | | 1995 | US | Mari Keiko Gonzalez | short film, 10 minutes |

=== 6th Festival (1997) ===
Festival reference

| English title | Original title | Year | Country | Director(s) | Notes |
|---|---|---|---|---|---|
| Beautiful Thing | | 1996 | UK | Hettie MacDonald | |
| Broken Branches | 내일로 흐르는 강 | 1996 | South Korea | Park Jae-ho (박재호) | Festival title: River for Tomorrow |
| Hustler White | | 1995 | Germany/Canada | Rick Castro; Bruce LaBruce | |
| Inn Trouble | | 1996 | US | Christina Rey | |
| It's Elementary: Talking About Gay Issues in School | | 1996 | US | Debra Chasnoff; Helen Cohen | documentary |
| Lilies | | 1996 | Canada | John Greyson | |
| Paris Was a Woman | | 1996 | UK/Germany | Greta Schiller | documentary |
| Excuse Me Darling, But Lucas Loved Me | Perdona bonita, pero Lucas me quería a mí | 1996 | Spain | Dunia Ayaso, Félix Sabroso | |
| Rescuing Desire | | 1995 | US | Adam Rogers | |
| Tama asobi | たまあそび | 1996 | Japan | Hiroyuki Ōki (大木裕之) | |
| Transsexual Menace | Vor Transsexuellen wird gewarnt | 1996 | Germany | Rosa von Praunheim | TV film |
| The Watermelon Woman | | 1995 | US | Cheryl Dunye | |
| 27 | | 1996 | US | Greg Sax | short film, 4 minutes |
| Beloved Murderer! | Beloved Murderer! | 1993 | Germany | Heidi Kull | short film, 8 minutes |
| Boys/Life | | 1989 | US | Philip B. Roth | short film, 10 minutes |
| Closet Case | | 1995 | Canada | Wrik Mead | short film, 4 minutes |
| Dike | | 1996 | Canada | Lisa Hayes | short film, 8 minutes |
| Excess Is What I Came For | | 1994 | Canada | Paula Gignac; Kathleen Pirrie Adams | documentary short, 8 minutes |
| If All Goes Well, I'll Be on the Next Train | Se tutto va bene prendo il prossimo treno... (che mi porti lontano da qui) | 1995 | Italy/Brazil | Mario Alves Rebehy | short film, 19 minutes |
| Johnny | | 1988 | Denmark | Ulrik Al Brask | short film, 8 minutes |
| Just a Little Crush | | 1995 | UK | Louise Wadley | short film, 10 minutes |
| Margaret Star: A Fall from Grace | | 1996 | Australia | Annabelle Murphy | short film, 8 minutes |
| Nice Girls Don't Do It | | 1990 | Canada | Kathy Daymond | short film, 11 minutes |
| Not Alone: A Hallowe'en Romance | | 1996 | Canada | Paul Hasick | short film, 26 minutes |
| On Earth as It Is in Heaven | | 1996 | UK | Ross Crookshank | short film, 35 minutes |
| Sailors Are the Wings of Love | | 1995 | US | Keith Keilman | short film, 10 minutes |
| We Always Danced | | 1996 | US | Nettie Marquez | short film, 8 minutes |
| Why I'll Never Trust You (In 200 Words or Less) | | 1995 | Canada | Cassandra Nicolaou | short film, 12 minutes |
| We're Talking Vulva | | 1990 | Canada | Shawna Dempsey; Lorri Millan | short film, 5 minutes |
| World of Women | | 1996 | US | Monica Nolan | short film, 10 minutes |

=== 7th Festival (1998) ===
Festival reference

| English title | Original title | Year | Country | Director(s) | Notes |
|---|---|---|---|---|---|
| Age of Dissent | | 1994 | UK | William Parry | TV film, Channel 4, 51 minutes |
| Cat Swallows Parakeet and Speaks! | | 1996 | Canada | Ileana Pietrobruno | |
| Dandy Dust | | 1998 | UK/Austria | A. Hans Scheirl | |
| The Delta | | 1996 | US | Ira Sachs | |
| East Palace, West Palace | 東宮西宮 | 1996 | China | Zhang Yuan | |
| Fatherless | ファザーレス – 父なき時代 Fazāresu – Chichi naki jidai | 1997 | Japan | Ryōya Shigeno (茂野良弥) | documentary |
| Full Speed | À toute vitesse | 1996 | France | Gaël Morel | |
| Hide and Seek | | 1996 | US | Su Friedrich | TV film |
| Like It Is | | 1997 | UK | Paul Oremland | |
| Leather Jacket Love Story | | 1997 | US | David DeCoteau | |
| Love's Debris | Poussières d'amour – Abfallprodukte der Liebe | 1996 | Germany/France/UK | Werner Schroeter | documentary |
| MURDER and murder | | 1996 | US | Yvonne Rainer | |
| Not Love, Just Frenzy | Más que amor, frenesí | 1996 | Spain | Alfonso Albacete; Miquel Bardem; David Menkes | |
| Not Simply a Wedding Banquet | 不只是喜宴 | 1997 | Taiwan | Mickey Chen; Ming-Hsiu Chen | documentary |
| Rock Hudson's Home Movies | | 1992 | US | Mark Rappaport | documentary |
| A Star Is Porn | | 1997 | UK | Todd Austin | documentary film, 51 minutes |
| Sunflowers | | 1996 | US | Shawn Hainsworth | documentary about the Sunflower Festival |
| To Play or To Die | Spelen of Sterven | 1990 | Netherlands | Frank Krom | |
| The Wrong Body Part II: Updates | | 1997 | UK | Nichola Koratjitis | documentary TV film, 53 minutes |
| Adam | | 1996 | US | Andrea Stoops | short film, 4 minutes |
| AIDS Rap | Le Rap du SIDA | 1994 | France | Michel Meyer | short film, 5 minutes; episode 9 of TV Series 3000 scénarios contre un virus |
| Amá-la | Amá-la | 1997 | Brazil/Netherlands | Roberta Marques | short film, 13 minutes |
| Atlanta | | 1996 | US | Miranda July | short film, 10 minutes |
| Better Shut Up | Mejor no hables | 1994 | Spain | Pedro Paz | short film, 14 minutes |
| Bleeding Heart | Corazón Sangrante | 1993 | Mexico | Ximena Cuevas | short film, 5 minutes |
| Breakfast with Gus | | 1997 | Canada | Siobhan Devine | short film, 8 minutes |
| Butch Femme | | 1995 | UK | Emma Hindley | short TV film, Channel 4/Dyke TV, 40 minutes |
| A Case of Body Art | Um caso de body art | 1997 | Brazil | João Landi Guimarães | documentary short, 19 minutes |
| Chronic | | 1996 | US | Jennifer Reeves | short film, 38 minutes |
| Closets Are for Clothes | Closets Are for Clothes | 1995 | Japan | Dezu | short film, 15 minutes |
| The Cop | Le Flic | 1994 | France | Xavier Durringer | short film, 3 minutes; episode 14 of TV Series 3000 scénarios contre un virus |
| Don't Bug Me | | 1997 | Canada | Allyson Mitchell | short film, 1 minute |
| Engorge, Gobble, Gulp | | 1994 | US | Lisa DiLillo | short film, 5 minutes |
| Gold Fish | Poisson rouge | 1994 | France | Cédric Klapisch | short film, 3 minutes; episode 28 of TV Series 3000 scénarios contre un virus |
| Grade AA Butt | | 1996 | US | Karisa Durr | short film, 6 minutes |
| Groove on a Stanley Knife | | 1997 | UK | Beth Kotler; Tinge Krishnan | short film, 42 minutes |
| Hermaphrodite Bikini | | 1995 | UK | Clio Barnard | short TV film, 5 minutes |
| Inside | Ded@ns | 1997 | France | Marion Vernoux | short film, 7 minutes; episode 6 of TV mini-series L'@mour est à réinventer |
| Intrepidíssima | Intrepidíssima | 1992 | Spain | Marta Balletbò-Coll | short film, 7 minutes |
| Jodie: An Icon | | 1996 | UK | Pratibha Parmar | documentary short, 24 minutes |
| Just For You Girls | | 1997 | US | MM Serra | short film, 2 minutes |
| A Kiss in the Snow | Kysset som fikk snøen til å smelte | 1997 | Norway | Frank Mosvold | short film, 22 minutes |
| Linger | | 1995 | UK | Billie Eltringham | short TV film, Channel 4/Dyke TV 2, 13 minutes |
| A Moment | Un moment | 1996 | France | Pierre Salvadori | short film, 6 minutes; episode 8 of TV mini-series L'@mour est à réinventer |
| Mona Lisa | Monalisa | 1997 | Brazil | Isabelle Bittencourt | short film, 1 minute |
| Monsters in the Closet | | 1993 | US | Jennifer Reeves | short film, 15 minutes |
| The Most Passionate Friend | 最も情熱的な愛人 Mottomo jōnetsuteki na aijin | 1996 | Japan | Aids Poster Project (APP) (エイズ・ポスター・プロジェクト) | slide show |
| My Cunt | | 1996 | Australia | Deb Strutt; Liz Baulch | short film, 4 minutes |
| My Friend Is Positive: For Those Who Have Friends That Are HIV+ | My Friend Is Positive －HIV+の友達を持つあなたへ－ | 1996 | Japan | Aids Poster Project (APP) (エイズ・ポスター・プロジェクト) | slide show |
| A Night with Derek | | 1995 | Canada/UK | Richard Kwietniowski | short documentary film, Channel 4, 25 minutes; documentary about Derek Jarman |
| Nobody I Know | | 1997 | Australia | Andrew Porter | short film, 9 minutes |
| One Day | ある日 Aru hi | 1995 | Japan | Christy Collins (クリスティ・コリンズ) | short film |
| One Shadowless Hour | 影のない1時間 Kage no nai ichi jikan | 1996 | Japan | Narusa Sasagawa (笹川なるさ) | short film, 29 minutes |
| One Way | One Way | 1997 | Brazil | Jorge de Souza | short film, 30 minutes |
| Particularly Now, in Spring | Particularly Now, in Spring | 1995 | Belgium | Bavo Defurne | short film, 8 minutes |
| Pregnant or Lesbian? | Enceinte ou Lesbienne? | 1997 | France | Françoise Decaux-Thomelet | short film, 4 minutes |
| The Room | La Chambre | 1994 | France | Cédric Klapisch | short film, 3 minutes; episode 30 of TV Series 3000 scénarios contre un virus |
| Rules of the Road | | 1993 | US | Su Friedrich | short film, 31 minutes |
| The Siren | La Sirène | 1994 | France | Philippe Lioret | short film, 4 minutes; episode 6 of TV Series 3000 scénarios contre un virus |
| Skip! | Skip! | 1997 | Japan | Kazuko Uchida (内田佳端子) | short film, 1.5 minutes |
| Somewhere Over the Rainbow | | 1994 | UK | | documentary short, 8 minutes; documentary about the 1994 New York Gay Parade and Gay Games |
| Summer | Summer | 1995 | Japan | Takako Tajiri (田尻孝子) | short film, 8 minutes |
| A Summer Dress | Une robe d'été | 1996 | France | François Ozon | short film, 15 minutes |
| Surviving Sabu | | 1997 | UK | Ian Iqbal Rashid | short film, 15 minutes |
| Tamago | TAMAGO | 1996 | Japan | Montage M (モンタージュM) | short film, 5 minutes |
| The Top Pig | Die Topsau | 1994 | Germany | Angela Holtschmidt | short film, 6 minutes |
| Twisted Sheets | | 1996 | Canada | Chris Deacon | short film, 14 minutes |
| Watching Her Sleep | | | US | Barbara Rose Michels | short film |
| What Is a Line? | | 1994 | US | Shari Frilot | short film, 10 minutes |
| Why I Hate Bees | | 1997 | Canada | Sarah Abbott | short film, 4 minutes |
| With the Whole Ocean to Swim | Com o oceano inteiro para nadar | 1997 | Brazil | Karen Harley | documentary short, 20 minutes |
| Wounded Bird | Wounded Bird | 1997 | Japan | T-Sue | short film, 16 minutes |

=== 8th Festival (1999) ===
Festival reference

| English title | Original title | Year | Country | Director(s) | Notes |
|---|---|---|---|---|---|
| 2 Seconds | 2 secondes | 1998 | Canada | Manon Briand | |
| Bishonen | 美少年之戀 | 1998 | Hong Kong | Yonfan | Festival title: Love of Adonis |
| Change of Sex | Cambio de Sexo | 1976 | Spain | Vicente Aranda | Festival title: Sex Change |
| Dark Habits | Entre tinieblas | 1983 | Spain | Pedro Almodóvar | |
| The Deputy | El diputado | 1978 | Spain | Eloy de la Iglesia | |
| Fire | फायर | 1996 | Canada/India | Deepa Mehta | |
| Flat Is Beautiful | | 1998 | US | Sadie Benning | |
| Inside Heart (Inside Mind) | 心の中 Kokoro no naka | 1999 | Japan | Hiroyuki Ōki (大木裕之) | |
| Portland Street Blues | 古惑仔情義篇之洪興十三妹 | 1998 | Hong Kong | Yip Wai Man | |
| Relax...It's Just Sex | | 1997 | US | P. J. Castellaneta | |
| Skin Flick | | 1999 | Germany/Canada/UK/Japan | Bruce LaBruce | |
| The Things of Love | Las cosas del querer | 1989 | Spain | Jaime Chávarri | Festival title: Things Called Love |
| Alkali, Iowa | | 1995 | US | Mark Christopher | short film, 17 minutes; see Boys Life 2 |
| Angel in the Toilet | 憚り天使 Habakari tenshi | 1999 | Japan | Kōichi Imaizumi (今泉浩一) | short film, 35 minutes |
| Blue Diary | | 1997 | US | Jenni Olson | short film, 6 minutes |
| Boy Next Door | | 1998 | US | Carl Pfirman | short film, 13 minutes |
| Boy with Cat | 猫と少年 Neko to shōnen | 1962 | Japan | Donald Richie | short film, 5 minutes |
| Close To | | 1997 | US | David Ottenhouse | short film, 9 minutes |
| Dirty Baby Does Fire Island | | 1997 | US | Todd Downing | animated short, 9 minutes |
| Et alors? | Et alors? | 1996 | France | François Dupeyron | short film, 6 minutes; episode 5 of TV mini-series L'@mour est à réinventer |
| Exchange | | 1998 | Ireland | Chris Reid | short film, 6 minutes |
| Fishbelly White | | 1998 | US | Michael Burke | short film, 22 minutes; basis for the 2003 feature film The Mudge Boy; see Boys Life 5 |
| The Great Pretenders | 과대망상 | 1996 | South Korea | Park Ki-Hyung (박기형) | short film, 36 minutes |
| The Judy Spots | | 1995 | US | Sadie Benning | short film, 12.5 minutes |
| La Mouette | La Mouette | 1996 | France | Nils Tavernier | short film, 5 minutes; episode 2 of TV mini-series L'@mour est à réinventer |
| Little White Lies | | 1997 | Australia | Della Churchill | short film, 9 minutes |
| Mrs. Cradock's Complaint | | 1997 | Australia | Tony Ayres | short film, 12 minutes |
| Nobody I Know | | 1997 | Australia | Andrew Porter | short film, 9 minutes |
| Peach | | 1993 | New Zealand | Christine Parker | short film, 16 minutes |
| Pointing Percy | | 1994 | UK | Kristiene Clarke | documentary short, 10 minutes |
| Prince of Peace | Prince of Peace | 1993 | Austria | Hans Scheugl | short film, 8 minutes |
| Roof | | 1998 | US | Betsy Kalin | short film, 22 minutes |
| Sailor | Matroos | 1998 | Belgium | Bavo Defurne | short film, 16 minutes |
| Savour Me | Sabor a mí | 1998 | Canada | Claudia Morgado Escanilla | short film, 21 minutes |
| Sleeping Beauties | | 1998 | US | Jamie Babbit | short film, 13 minutes |
| Stanley Beloved | 爱在士丹利 | 1997 | Hong Kong | Simon Chung (鐘徳勝) | short film, 16 minutes |
| Strait | | 1996 | US | Evie Leder | short film, 12 minutes |
| Such Candor | | 1998 | US | Marc Siegel | short film, 10 minutes |
| Traveling Companion | | 1998 | US | Paula Goldberg | short film, 19 minutes |
| Une nuit ordinaire | Une nuit ordinaire | 1997 | France | Jean-Claude Guiguet | short film, 7 minutes; episode 3 of TV mini-series L'@mour est à réinventer |
| Wavelengths | | 1997 | UK | Pratibha Parmar | short film, 15 minutes |
| Waves | Bølgene | 1998 | Norway | Frank Mosvold | short film, 11 minutes |

=== 9th Festival (2000) ===
Festival reference

| English title | Original title | Year | Country | Director(s) | Notes |
|---|---|---|---|---|---|
| Being Here With You | Being Here With You | 1998 | Japan | Hisaya Murabayashi (村林久弥) | documentary |
| Better Than Chocolate | | 1999 | Canada | Anne Wheeler | |
| The Brandon Teena Story | | 1998 | US | Susan Muska; Gréta Olafsdóttir | documentary |
| Franchesca Page | | 1996 | US | Kelley Sane | |
| The Hanging Garden | | 1997 | UK/Canada | Thom Fitzgerald | |
| Head On | | 1998 | Australia | Ana Kokkinos | |
| Intimates | 自梳 Ji Sor | 1997 | Hong Kong | Jacob Cheung | |
| Late Bloomers | | 1996 | US | Julia Dyer | |
| Licensed To Kill | | 1997 | US | Arthur Dong | documentary |
| Lola and Billy the Kid | Lola und Bilidikid | 1998 | Germany | Kutluğ Ataman | |
| Nico and Dani | Krámpack | 2000 | Spain | Cesc Gay | |
| Queer as Folk | | 1999 | UK | Charles McDougall; Sarah Harding | TV series, episodes 1–4 |
| Trick | | 1999 | US | Jim Fall | |
| Yang ± Yin: Gender in Chinese Cinema | 男生女相 | 1996 | Hong Kong | Stanley Kwan | |
| Anything Once | | 1998 | US | Dan Aeberhard | short film, 22 minutes |
| Backroom | | 1999 | Spain | Guillem Morales | short film, 13 minutes |
| Bargain Lingerie | Lencería de ocasión | 1999 | Spain | Teresa Marcos | short film, 15 minutes |
| Below the Belt | UK | 1998 | | Nigel Barton | short film, 15 minutes |
| Better Shut Up | Mejor no hables | 1994 | Spain | Pedro Paz | short film, 13 minutes |
| Bitter Juice | 苦い汁 Nigai shiru | 2000 | Japan | Hirohiko Ueoka (植岡浩彦) | short film, 21 minutes |
| Blow Up a Go-Go | | 1973 | UK | James Clarke | short film, 3 minutes |
| Candy Kisses | | 1999 | Canada | Allyson Mitchell | short film, 3 minutes |
| chocolate | chocolate | 2000 | Japan | iri | short film, 28 minutes |
| Desire | | 1999 | Spain/US | Jorge Torregrossa | short film, 14 minutes; based on a short story by E. M. Forster |
| Disposable Lez | 使い捨てレズ Tsukai-sute rezu | 1999 | Japan | Desiree Lim | short film, 6 minutes |
| Doors Cut Down | En malas compañías | 2000 | Spain | Antonio Hens | short film, 17 minutes |
| Fairy Tale | | 1998 | US | David Kitteridge | short film, 30 minutes |
| Family Pictures | | 2000 | Spain | Jorge Torregrossa | short film, 5 minutes |
| Just One Time | | 1998 | US | Lane Janger | short film, 7 minutes; see Boys Life 3 |
| La Glace | グラース | 2000 | | Toshiko Takashi (崟利子) | short film, 25 minutes |
| Le Petite mort | | 1998 | Germany | Sylke Rene Meyer | short film, 8 minutes |
| Maid of Honor | | 1999 | US | Jennifer Arnold | short film, 25 minutes |
| Majorettes in Space | Des majorettes dans l'espace | 1996 | France | David Fourier | short film, 6 minutes |
| My Sexuality | My Sexuality | 1999 | Japan | Lulu Ogawa (尾川ルル) | short film, 40 minutes |
| One Small Step | | 1998 | US | Catherine Crouch | short film, 29 minutes |
| Otoko | OTOKO | 1997 | US | Kurt Kim | short film, 9 minutes |
| Parenthesis | Paréntesis | 2000 | Spain | Indalecio Corugedo | short film, 16 minutes |
| Rick & Steve: The Happiest Gay Couple in All the World: 1. Guess Who's Coming for Quiche? | | 1999 | US | Q. Allan Brocka | stop motion animated short, episode 1, 9 minutes |
| Tatoo | Tatuaje | 1984 | Spain | Pedro Almodóvar | short film, 8 minutes |
| Trailer for Lovers of the Prohibited | Tráiler para amantes de lo prohibido | 1985 | Spain | Pedro Almodóvar | TV short film, 20 minutes |
| A Weekend Drive | Dans la décapotable | 1996 | France | Merzak Allouache | short film, 5 minutes; episode 1 of TV mini-series L'@mour est à réinventer |
| Yellow Fever | | 1998 | UK/Hong Kong | Raymond Yeung | short film, 26 minutes |

=== 10th Festival (2001) ===
Festival reference

| English title | Original title | Year | Country | Director(s) | Notes |
|---|---|---|---|---|---|
| Addicted to Love | 僕は恋に夢中 Boku wa koi ni muchū | 1999 | Japan | Yumi Yoshiyuki | |
| The Broken Hearts Club | | 2000 | US | Greg Berlanti | |
| Chutney Popcorn | | 1999 | US | Nisha Ganatra | |
| Florentine | פלורנטין | 1997 | Israel | Eytan Fox | TV series, 3 episodes |
| The Sea | El mar | 2000 | Spain | Agustí Villaronga | |
| Set Me Free | Emporte-moi | 1999 | Canada/Switzerland/France | Léa Pool | |
| Improper Conduct (Dirty Conduct) | Mauvaise Conduite | 1981 | France | Néstor Almendros; Orlando Jiménez Leal | documentary |
| Memento Mori | 여고괴담 II | 1999 | South Korea | Kim Tae-yong; Min Kyu-dong | |
| Second Skin | Segunda Piel | 1999 | Spain | Gerardo Vera | |
| Burnt Money | Plata quemada | 2000 | Argentina/Spain/France/Uruguay | Marcelo Piñeyro | |
| Come Undone | Presque rien | 2000 | France | Sébastien Lifshitz | |
| Psycho Beach Party | | 2000 | US | Robert Lee King | |
| The Sissy Duckling | | 1999 | US | Anthony Bell | animation; based on The Sissy Duckling by Harvey Fierstein |
| Sugar Sweet | シュガースイート | 2001 | Japan | Desiree Lim | TV film |
| Zipper & Tits | ファスナーと乳房 Fasunā to chibusa | 2001 | Japan | Kōji Shirakawa (白川 幸司) | |
| 3-Second Melancholy | 3秒の憂鬱 Sanbyō no yūutsu | 2001 | Japan | iri | short film, 40 minutes |
| Achilles | | 1995 | UK | Barry Purves | animated short, 11 minutes |
| The Ambiguously Gay Duo | | 1996~1999 | US | J. J. Sedelmaier | live-action/animated TV series, 7 episodes, 29 minutes |
| Blair Bitch Project | ブレア・ビッチ・プロジェクト | 2001 | Japan | Akahige (あかひげ) | animated short, 3 minutes |
| Bone Wish | | 2000 | US | Abigail Severance | short film, 5 minutes |
| Coming Out | 커밍아웃 | 1999 | South Korea | Young-Pa Women's Middle School Broadcasting; Circle 17th Year (영파여중 방송반 17기) | short film, 15 minutes |
| Compulsion | | 2000 | US | Ping Tan | short film, 5 minutes |
| Crush | | 2000 | US | Phillip J. Bartell | short film, 27 minutes |
| Dessous | | 2000 | Germany | Luc Feit | short film, 6 minutes |
| An Early Frost | Gelée précoce | 1999 | France | Pierre Pinaud | short film, 17 minutes |
| Funny Guy | 웃긴 놈 | 2000 | South Korea | Kim Sung-Joong (김성중); Kim Hee (김희) | short film, 6 minutes |
| Gotta Have Heart | בעל בעל לב Ba'al Ba'al Lev | 1998 | Israel | Eytan Fox | short film, 37 minutes |
| grey SILENCE | grey SILENCE | 2001 | Japan | HIROKI iwasa (岩佐浩樹) | short film, 17 minutes |
| Hete-Roy | | 1998 | US | J. J. Sedelmaier | animated short, 3 minutes |
| Home for Christmas | Hjem til jul | 2000 | Norway | Frank Mosvold | short film, 5 minutes |
| I Love the Movies | J'adore le cinéma | 1998 | Belgium | Vincento Lannoo | short film, 15 minutes Festival title: I Love Cinema |
| The Kiss | Der Kuß | 1999 | Germany | Petra Blondina Volpe | short film, 5 minutes |
| Lachrymal | 눈물 Nunmul | 1998 | South Korea | Chang-jae Lim (임 창재) | short film, 20 minutes |
| ...lost | | 2000 | US | Dan Castle | short film, 5 minutes |
| Love, Ltd. | | 1999 | US | Jennifer Thuy Lan Phang | short film, 20 minutes |
| Luna Butterfly | | 1999 | US | Katherine Brooks | short film, 8 minutes |
| Mother's Day | La fête des mères | 1999 | Belgium | Chris Vander Stappen | short film, 16 minutes |
| The Mountain King | | 2000 | US | Duncan Tucker | short film, 21 minutes |
| My Beautiful Neighbour | Min smukke nabo | 1999 | Denmark | Amir Rezazadeh | short film, 15 minutes |
| Pantalones | Pantalones | 2000 | Spain | Ana Martínez | short film, 4 minutes |
| Piglets | | 1998 | Germany | Luc Feit | short film, 3 minutes |
| Pink | 핑크 | 1999 | South Korea | Ryu Hyun-Sook (류현숙) | short film, 13 minutes |
| The Rape of Ganymede | | 1999 | US | Tom Whitman; Dustin Woehrmann | animated short, 10 minutes |
| Sandwitch | 샌드위치 | 1998 | South Korea | Lim Woo-Jung (임우정); Yoo Sun-dong (유선동) | short film, 16 minutes |
| Sugar Hill | 슈가힐 | 2000 | South Korea | Leesong Hee-il | short film, 23 minutes |
| Time Off (a.k.a. After) | אפטר | 1990 | Israel | Eytan Fox | short film, 45 minutes |
| Weeki Wachee Girls | | 1999 | US | Kim Cummings | short film, 23 minutes |

=== 11th Festival (2002) ===
Festival reference

| English title | Original title | Year | Country | Director(s) | Notes |
|---|---|---|---|---|---|
| All Over the Guy | | 2001 | US | Julie Davis | |
| Always Proud: Special Edition for TILGFF | Always Proud 東京国際L&G映画祭特別編集版; Tōkyō kokusai L&G eigasai tokubetsu henshūban | 2001 | Japan | Yoshihiko Takeo (武緒義彦); G Project | documentary compilation from 2000 to 2001 Tokyo Lesbian and Gay Parades, 5th Rainbow March in Sapporo (2001), and Tokyo Rainbow Matsuri (2000, 2001) |
| Family Pack | Que faisaient les femmes pendant que l'homme marchait sur la lune? | 2000 | France/Canada/Belgium/Switzerland | Chris Vander Stappen | |
| Fish and Elephant | 今年夏天 | 2001 | China | Li Yu | |
| Food of Love | | 2001 | Spain/Germany | Ventura Pons | |
| Incidental Journey | 海角天涯 Haijiao tianya | 2001 | Taiwan | Jo-Fei Chen (陳若菲) | |
| Julie Johnson | | 2000 | US | Bob Gosse | |
| Km. 0 | Km. 0 (Kilómetro cero) | 2000 | Spain/Germany | Yolanda García Serrano; Juan Luis Iborra | |
| Lan Yu | 蓝宇 | 2001 | Hong Kong/China | Stanley Kwan | |
| Naughty Boys | ノーティー・ボーイズ | 2002 | Japan | Kōichi Imaizumi (今泉浩一) | |
| Southern Comfort | | 2000 | US | Kate Davis | documentary |
| 4 P.M. | | 2000 | UK | Samantha Bakhurst; Lea Morement | short film, 13 minutes |
| Atomic Saké | | 2000 | Canada | Louise Archambault | short film, 33 minutes |
| Babyface | 私顔 | 2000 | Taiwan | Cheng Yu-Chieh | short film, 37 minutes |
| Bare | | 2001 | Australia | Deb Strutt; Liz Baulch | short film, 9 minutes |
| Embrace | エンブレイス | 2001 | Japan | Yasuyuki Kubota (久保田恭之) | short film, 20 minutes |
| The Favor | | 2001 | US | Ernesto M. Foronda | short film, 5 minutes |
| G8 | G8 | 2002 | Japan | Hiroyuki Ōki (大木裕之) | documentary short, 40 minutes |
| Gifts | Cadeaux | 2000 | France | Jean-Pascal Hattu | short film, 20 minutes |
| A Good Son | | 1998 | US | Robert Little | short film, 12 minutes |
| Late Summer | | 2000 | US | David Ottenhouse | short film, 25 minutes; see short film compilation Boys Life 5 |
| Meeting | Entrevue | 1999 | France | Marie-Pierre Huster | short film, 9 minutes |
| Petals | | 2001 | India | Suresh Natarajan | short film, 16 minutes |
| Rick & Steve: The Happiest Gay Couple in All the World: 1. Guess Who's Coming for Quiche?; 2. Bush Baby; 3. Damn Straights | | 1999 | US | Q. Allan Brocka | stop motion animated shorts, episodes 1–3, 24 minutes (8 minutes each) |
| Seven Days | | 2000 | Canada | Tania Trepanier | short film, 12 minutes |
| Vision for the Death of Buddy Matsumae | 松前君の死のための映像 Matsumae-kun no shi no tame no eizō | 2002 | Japan | Hiroyuki Ōki (大木裕之) | documentary short, 30 minutes |
| War Story | | 2000 | US | John Baumgartner | short film, 30 minutes |

=== 12th Festival (2003) ===
Festival reference

| English title | Original title | Year | Country | Director(s) | Notes |
|---|---|---|---|---|---|
| 9 Dead Gay Guys | | 2002 | UK | Lab Ky Mo | |
| Britney Baby, One More Time | | 2002 | US/France/Netherlands | Ludi Boeken | |
| Documenting Us | ジャックが教えてくれたこと Jakku ga oshiete kureta koto | 2003 | US/Japan | Ian Thomas Ash | documentary |
| The Adventures of Felix | Drôle de Félix | 1999 | France | Olivier Ducastel; Jacques Martineau | |
| Girl King | | 2002 | Canada | Ileana Pietrobruno | |
| I Am Not What You Want | 天使 | 2001 | Hong Kong | Kit Hung | |
| I Love You Baby | I Love You Baby | 2002 | Spain | Alfonso Albacete; David Menkes | |
| The Journey to Kafiristan | Die Reise nach Kafiristan | 2001 | Germany | Donatello Dubini; Fosco Dubini | |
| Mango Soufflé | | 2000 | India | Mahesh Dattani | |
| Men in Love (2002 film) | 恋する男たち Koisuru otokotachi | 2002 | Japan | Yutaka Ikejima | |
| My Mother Likes Women | A mi madre le gustan las mujeres | 2002 | Spain | Inés París; Daniela Fejerman | |
| Out in the Cold (film) | | 2001 | US | Martin Bedogne; Eric Criswell | documentary |
| Shake It All About | En Kort en lang | 2001 | Denmark | Hella Joof | |
| All About Sisters | オール・アバウト・シスターズ | 2002 | Japan | Kana Sakai (酒井加奈) | short film, 38 minutes |
| The Ambiguously Gay Duo: 1. The Ambiguously Gay Duo Fan Club; 2. AmbiguoBoys; 3. Trouble Coming Twice | | 1998; 1999; 2000 | US | J. J. Sedelmaier | live-action/animated TV series, 13 minutes |
| Bitanic | | 2001 | US | Corky Quakenbush | short film, 5 minutes |
| Blue Haven | | 2000 | US | Julian Cautherly | short film, 17 minutes |
| Glaadiator | | 2001 | US | Luka Pecel | short film, 9 minutes |
| I Am in Love | 好きな人ができました。 Sukina hito ga dekimashita. | 2003 | Japan | Sayaka Nakashima (中島さや香) | short film, 37 minutes |
| Lookin' Cute, Feelin' Cute | | 2003 | US | Jonny McGovern | music video, 4 minutes |
| Mad Blossom | 狂華 Kyōka | 2002 | Japan | Masami Shimizu (清水雅美) | short film, 21 minutes |
| Nina | | 2002 | Australia | Rolmar Baldonado | short film, 10 minutes |
| On the Outs | | 2002 | US | Courtney Rowe | short film, 24 minutes |
| Peeling | | 2002 | US | Heidi Bollock | short film, 13 minutes |
| Pimp & Ho Trilogy: 1. Pimp & Ho: Adventures in Queersploitation; 2. Pimp & Ho: Licence To Queer; 3. Pimp & Ho: Queer Fashion Crime Models | | 2001; 2002; 2002 | Canada | Mark Kenneth Woods | short films, 40 minutes total: 1. 9 minutes 2. 18 minutes 3. 13 minutes |
| Touch | | 2001 | Canada | Jeremy Podeswa | short film, 29 minutes |
| Seventy | | 2003 | US | Q. Allan Brocka | short film, 8 minutes |
| Soccer Practice | | 2002 | US | Peter Martinez | short film, 4 minutes |
| Unhung Heroes | | 2002 | US | Lazlo Ilya Pearlman | short film, 15 minutes |
| Watching You | להביט בך | 2000 | Israel | Stephanie Abramovich (סטפני אברמוביץ') | short film, 32 minutes |
| Yellow Peppers | פלפלים צהובים | 2000 | Israel | Tammar Barkai; Ronit Foux | short film, 30 minutes |

=== 13th Festival (2004) ===
Festival reference

| English title | Original title | Year | Country | Director(s) | Notes |
|---|---|---|---|---|---|
| All About My Father | Alt om min far | 2002 | Norway | Even Benestad | |
| The Best of School | Grande École | 2004 | France | Robert Salis | |
| Bulgarian Lovers | Los Novios búlgaros | 2002 | Spain | Eloy de la Iglesia | Festival title: The Bulgarian Lovers |
| Die, Mommie, Die! | | 2003 | US | Mark Rucker | |
| Do I Love You? | | 2002 | UK | Lisa Gornick | |
| The Event | | 2003 | Canada | Thom Fitzgerald | |
| Goldfish Memory | | 2003 | Ireland | Elizabeth Gill | |
| Lily Festival | 百合祭 Yurisai | 2001 | Japan | Sachi Hamano | |
| Road Movie | 로드무비 | 2002 | South Korea | Kim In-sik | |
| When I Need You Most | せつないかもしれない | 2004 | Japan | Yumi Yoshiyuki | Festival title: Just When I Need You Most; screened with The Making of "Just When I Need You Most" (せつないかもしれないメイキング) directed by Chigumi Ōbayashi (大林千茱萸) |
| Yossi & Jagger | יוסי וג'אגר | 2002 | Israel | Eytan Fox | |
| Blue-Eyed Moon | Луната със сините очи Lunata sas sinete ochi | 2001 | Bulgaria | Pencho Kunchev (Пенчо Кунчев) | silent animated short, 8 minutes |
| Bonten | 梵天 Bonten | 2004 | Japan | Keisaku Satō (佐藤圭作) | short film, 24 minutes |
| donor | | 2002 | US | Adele Wilson; Eve Whitaker | short film, 29 minutes |
| Ex | | 2003 | Australia | Andrew Soo | short film, 8.5 minutes |
| Far West | Far West | 2003 | France | Pascal-Alex Vincent | short film, 18 minutes |
| Fukai | フカイ Fukai | 2004 | Japan | Masazumi Uramoto (浦本正純) | short film, 9 minutes |
| GRAIN. | | 2003 | US | Daniel G. Sosa | short film, 8 minutes |
| I'd Like to Know About Love | Volevo sapere sull'amore | 2003 | Italy | Max Croci | short film, 11 minutes |
| In the Beginning | Au commencement | 2004 | Belgium | Laurent Leprince | animated short, 3 minutes |
| Interviews with My Next Girlfriend | | 2001 | Canada | Cassandra Nicolaou | short film, 13 minutes |
| Night Kiss | Beso nocturno | 2000 | Canada/Mexico | Boris Rodriguez | short film, 14 minutes |
| Queer Boys and Girls on the Bullet Train: 1. Bye-Bye "Over the Rainbow"; 2. I Want You to Kiss Me; 3. I Hum, She's Dashing When She Walks; 4. wrap! rap! -10cs3-; 5. KEY; 6. Techniques for Deadly Blows in 199X; 7. One Brilliant Moment; 8. Parallel Contact; 9. The Untitled Slide Show; 10. machi27 | Queer Boys and Girls on the SHINKANSEN: 1. バイバイ・オーバー・ザ・レインボウ; 2. キスしてほしい; 3. 鼻歌をうたう私と颯爽とあるく彼女; 4. wrap! rap! -10cs3-; 5. KEY; 6. 199X年の必殺技; 7. かがよひ; 8. パラレル・コンタクト; 9. The Untitled Slide Show; 10. 町27 | 2004 | Japan | 1. Akira the Hustler (アキラ・ザ・ハスラー); 2. Kōichi Imaizumi (今泉浩一); 3. iri 4. woolala satoko (うららさとこ); 5. Yen-Nien Kang (康延年); 6. Keiichi Takasaki (タカサキケイイチ); 7. Hiroki Taguchi (田口弘樹); 8. Kenjirō Hasegawa (長谷川健治朗); 9. Tomoaki Hata (畑智章); 10. Yūko Hirai (平井優子) | omnibus work of 10 short films, each a "five-minute film about lesbians or gay men", planned and produced by Kōichi Imaizumi and Hiroki Iwasa's "habakari-cinema" (「レズビアン/ゲイをテーマにした5分間の映像」10本の短編映画で構成されたオムニバス作品); 55 minutes |
| Queer Web | | 2002 | US | J.T. O'Neal | short film, 6 minutes |
| Reconciliation | 仲直り Nakanaori | 2004 | Japan | Manabu Oda (小田学) | short film, 9 minutes |
| Savour Me | Sabor a mí | 1997 | Canada | Claudia Morgado Escanilla | short film, 22 minutes |
| Shipping and Handling | | 2002 | US | Richard Bever | short film, 28 minutes |
| Straight in the Face | | 2002 | Canada | Peter Demas | short film, 13 minutes |
| Take-Out | | 2000 | Canada | Jean-François Monette | short film, 38 minutes |
| This Boy | | 2002 | Canada | Amy Burt | short film, 21 minutes |
| You 2 | | 2001 | Netherlands | Pascale Simmons | short film, 25 minutes |

=== 14th Festival (2005) ===
Festival reference

| English title | Original title | Year | Country | Director(s) | Notes |
|---|---|---|---|---|---|
| Big Eden | | 2000 | US | Thomas Bezucha | |
| Bear Cub | Cachorro | 2004 | Spain | Miguel Albaladejo | |
| Butterfly | 蝴蝶 Húdié | 2004 | Hong Kong | Yan Yan Mak | |
| Cowboys & Angels | | 2003 | Ireland/Germany/UK | David Gleeson | |
| The Gathering | Arisan! | 2003 | Indonesia | Nia Dinata | |
| Sunflower | 向日葵 Himawari | 2004 | Japan | Masanobu Kawamura (河村昌伸); Yūzō Teshigawara (勅使河原雄蔵) | |
| The L Word | | 2003 | US | Rose Troche | |
| Making Grace | | 2004 | US | Catherine Gund | documentary |
| Mango Kiss | | 2004 | US | Sascha Rice | |
| Mysterious Skin | | 2005 | US/Netherlands | Gregg Araki | |
| Proteus | | 2003 | Canada/South Africa | John Greyson | |
| Round Trip (film) | | 2003 | Israel | Shahar Rozen | |
| Slutty Summer | | 2004 | US | Casper Andreas | |
| Straight Out | Hrein og bein | 2003 | Iceland | Hrafnhildur Gunnarsdóttir; Þorvaldur Kristinsson | documentary |
| Sugar | | 2004 | Canada | John Palmer | |
| Touch of Pink | | 2004 | Canada/UK | Ian Iqbal Rashid | |
| Tying the Knot | | 2004 | US | Jim de Sève | documentary |
| Whistling...1985 | ヒュルル...1985 Hyururu...1985 | 1985 | Japan | Ryōsuke Hashiguchi | |
| YA-O-I Girl's Ultimate Fantasy | 青春801あり! Seishun yaoi ari! | 2004 | Japan | Naomi Watanabe (渡辺直美) | |
| Crush | | 2004 | US | R.J. Spencer | short film, 15 minutes |
| The D Word | | 2004 | US | Dasha Snyder | short film, 40 minutes |
| Dummy Ozmar | 実験人形 ダミー・オズマー Jikken ningyō damī ozumā | 2000 | Japan | Hirono Yamada (山田広野) | short film, 7 minutes |
| Dummy Ozmar : The Lesbian Gigolo Cut | 実験人形 ダミー・オズマー レズビアンジゴロ篇; Jikken ningyō damī ozumā rezubian jigoro hen | 2005 | Japan | Hirono Yamada (山田広野) | short film, 7 minutes |
| Fa | ファ | 1981 | Japan | Ryōsuke Hashiguchi | short film, 4 minutes |
| F*Stop | | 2004 | US | Roberta Degnore | short film, 10 minutes |
| Getting to Know You | | 2004 | US | Liz Lachman | short film, 20 minutes |
| Give or Take an Inch | | 2003 | US | Lee Friedlander | short film, 14 minutes |
| Hummer | | 2003 | US | Guinevere Turner | short film, 10 minutes |
| Intent | | 2003 | US | Mary Ann Marino | short film, 14 minutes |
| Into the Night | | 2002 | Australia | Tony Krawitz | short film, 15 minutes |
| Itsuiro | 五色 Itsuiro | 2004 | Japan | Aya Yamaoki | short film, 19 minutes |
| JUON4 | 呪怨4 Juon yon | 2005 | Japan | Hirono Yamada (山田広野) | short film, 7 minutes |
| The Last Night | L'ultima notte | 2003 | Canada | Mathieu Guez | short film, 20 minutes; in French |
| Lesbian City, Shinjuku | レズビアンシティ新宿 Rezubian shiti Shinjuku | 1998 | Japan | Hirono Yamada (山田広野) | short film, 14 minutes |
| Mika & Seijun | みかとせいじゅん Mika to Seijun | 2004 | Japan | Daisuke Yamaoka (山岡大祐) | short film, 13 minutes |
| My President | ぼくの大統領 Boku no daitōryō | 2003 | Japan | Hirono Yamada (山田広野) | short film, 7 minutes |
| The Nearly Unadventurous Life of Zoe Cadwaulder | | 2004 | US | Buboo Kakati | short film, 12 minutes |
| Soiree's Heart | ソワレの心臓 Soware no shinzō | 2002 | Japan | Hirono Yamada (山田広野) | short film, 7 minutes |
| "Stereotype Company" | 「ヘテロ薬」 "Hetero-yaku" | 2005 | Japan | Team "Stereotype Company" (ヘテロ薬制作委員会) | short film, 43 minutes; Rainbow Reel Competition winner |
| Styx | | 2003 | Germany | Falk Ulbrich | short film, 23 minutes |
| The Ten Rules | | 2002 | US | Lee Friedlander | short film, 28 minutes |
| What Ever Happened to Ms. Machiko? | マチコのかたち Machiko no katachi | 2005 | Japan | Kōji Shirakawa (白川幸司) | short film, 30 minutes |
| Who's Scared of a Test? | 検査なんて怖くない Kensa nante kowakunai | 2004 | Japan | Junchan (じゅんちゃん) | short film, 15 minutes; made in cooperation with the Tokyo Metropolitan Testing and Counseling Office in Minami Shinjuku (東京都運営のHIV無料検査所「新宿南検査所」) |
| A Woman Reported | | 2004 | US | Kelly Hankin | short film, 5 minutes |
| A Wonderful Day | | 2003 | Australia | Robbie Baldwin | short film, 13 minutes |

=== 15th Festival (2006) ===
Festival reference

| English title | Original title | Year | Country | Director(s) | Notes |
|---|---|---|---|---|---|
| 20 Centimeters | 20 centímetros | 2005 | Spain | Ramón Salazar | |
| El Favor | El Favor | 2004 | Argentina | Pablo Sofovich | |
| Eternal Summer | 盛夏光年 | 2006 | Taiwan | Leste Chen | |
| eXposed: The Making of a Legend | | 2005 | US | mr. Pam | documentary |
| Floored by Love | | 2005 | Canada | Desiree Lim | TV film |
| g8-2 (kari) | g8-2 (カリ) | 2006 | Japan | Hiroyuki Ōki (大木裕之) | |
| Girl Play | | 2004 | US | Lee Friedlander | |
| The Journey | സഞ്ചാരം | 2004 | India | Ligy J. Pullappally | |
| Latter Days | | 2003 | US | C. Jay Cox | |
| The Masseur | Masahista | 2005 | Philippines | Brillante Mendoza | |
| Saving Face | | 2004 | US | Alice Wu | |
| Silk | シルク | 2006 | Japan | Isao Shimokura (下倉功) | |
| S/N | | 2005 | Japan | Dumb Type (ダムタイプ) | documentary |
| Summer Storm | Sommersturm | 2004 | Germany | Marco Kreuzpaintner | |
| Yang ± Yin: Gender in Chinese Cinema | 男生女相 | 1996 | Hong Kong | Stanley Kwan | |
| You I Love | Я люблю тебя | 2004 | Russia | Olga Stolpovskaja; Dmitry Troitsky | |
| Breaking Up Really Sucks | | 2001 | US | Jennifer McGlone | short film, 10 minutes |
| chew it up #0 Imagine. | | 2001 | Japan | izmoo & Mia | documentary short, 7 minutes |
| Cosa Bella | | 2006 | US | Fiona MacKenzie | short film, 15 minutes |
| A Crimson Mark | 순흔 (脣痕) | 2004 | South Korea | Hyun-Jin Park (박현진) | short film, 13 minutes |
| Dani & Alice | | 2003 | Canada/US | Roberta Marie Munroe | short film, 12 minutes |
| The Fiance | La fidanzata | 2004 | Switzerland | Petra Biondina Volpe | short film, 11 minutes |
| LIVE | LIVE | 2005 | Japan | Rarara Matsumoto (松本ららら) | short film, 2 minutes |
| Living Together | | | Japan | | documentary short, 30 minutes; interviews concerning the HIV/AIDS situation in Japan with vocalist Jill of the band Personz |
| Lululu | Lululu | 2006 | Japan | Pakurane | short film, 6 minutes |
| Memoirs of an Evil Stepmother | | 2004 | US | Cherien Dabis | short film, 18 minutes |
| Moustache | | 2004 | Australia | Vicki Sugars | short film, 14 minutes |
| Plica-Chan | プリカちゃん | 2006 | Japan | Sae Amamiya (天宮沙江); Yoshi Uchida (内田嘉) | animated short, 32 minutes |
| Rainbow Heart | 虹の心 Niji no kokoro | 2006 | Japan | Kazuya Andō (安藤佳寿哉) | documentary short, 8 minutes |
| Scenery at Dawn | はじまりの風景 Hajimari no fūkei | 2005 | Japan | Noa Nagaoka (長岡野亜) | documentary short, 30 minutes |
| Sissy Frenchfry | | 2005 | US | J.C. Oliva | short film, 28 minutes |
| Somewhere in Tokyo | 東京のどこかで Tōkyō no dokoka de | 2006 | Japan | Kenta Tatenai (タテナイケンタ) | short film, 19 minutes; Rainbow Reel Competition winner |
| Starcrossed | | 2005 | US | James Burkhammer | short film, 15 minutes |
| Such Great Joy | | 2005 | US | Michelle Kramer | short film, 14 minutes |
| What Grown-Ups Know | | 2004 | Australia | Jonathan Wald | short film, 30 minutes |

=== 16th Festival (2007) ===
Festival reference

| English title | Original title | Year | Country | Director(s) | Notes |
|---|---|---|---|---|---|
| 3 Needles | | 2005 | Canada | Thom Fitzgerald | |
| All Aboard! Rosie's Family Cruise | | 2006 | US | Shari Cookson | documentary |
| Another Gay Movie | | 2006 | US | Todd Stephens | |
| Boy Culture | | 2006 | US | Q. Allan Brocka | |
| The Bubble | הבועה | 2006 | Israel | Eytan Fox | |
| Dangerous Living: Coming Out in the Developing World | | 2003 | US | John Scagliotti | documentary |
| Eternal Summer | 盛夏光年 | 2006 | Taiwan | Leste Chen | |
| A Four Letter Word | | 2007 | US | Casper Andreas | |
| Go! Go! G-Boys | 當我們同在一起 | 2007 | Taiwan | Jong-Jong Yu | |
| The Gymnast | | 2006 | US | Ned Farr | |
| Itty Bitty Titty Committee | | 2007 | US | Jamie Babbit | |
| Love My Life | ラブ・マイ・ライフ | 2006 | Japan | Kōji Kawano (川野浩司) | |
| Loving Annabelle | | 2006 | US | Katherine Brooks | |
| Puccini for Beginners | | 2006 | US | Maria Maggenti | |
| Queer Duck: The Movie | | 2006 | US | Xeth Feinberg | |
| Spider Lilies | 刺青 (Cì Qīng) | 2007 | Taiwan | Zero Chou | |
| Sukitomo | スキトモ -スペシャル・エディション- | 2006 | Japan | Mitsuhiro Mihara | |
| To Be Myself | 私が私であるために Watashi wa watashi de aru tame ni | 2006 | Japan | Nobuhiro Kamikawa (上川伸廣) | TV film |
| Until the Moon Waxes | その月が満ちるまで Sono tsuki ga michiru made | 2007 | Japan | iri (イリ) | |
| Dichotomy Innocent | | 2005 | Canada | Evie Farmer | short film, 12 minutes |
| Family Reunion | Gódir gestir | 2006 | Iceland | Ísold Uggadóttir | short film, 21 minutes |
| Hold Up | | 2005 | US | Madeleine Olnek | short film, 7 minutes |
| Hung | | 2005 | US | Guinevere Turner | short film, 13 minutes |
| Lucky Blue | | 2007 | Sweden | Håkon Liu | short film, 28 minutes |
| nakedyouth | nakedyouth | 2006 | Japan | Kōjirō Shishido (宍戸幸次郎) | animated short, 10 minutes |
| Night Together | | 2006 | Canada | Cameron Groves | short film, 8 minutes |
| No Border | No Border ～世界のLGBTからのメッセージ～ Sekai no LGBT kara no messēji | 2007 | Japan | Kanako Otsuji akaboshi | documentary short, 38 minutes; a compilation of messages from around the world for LBGT in Japan |
| Parting Words | Derniers mots | 2006 | Canada | Joe Balass | short film, 8 minutes |
| Scarred | | 2006 | UK | Damien Rea | short film, 10 minutes |
| Someday, It Will Be Holland | いつか、オランダのように Itsuka, oranda no yō ni | 2006 | Japan | Shin Ichikawa (市川伸) | short film, 44 minutes |
| Succubus | | 2006 | Canada | Alison Reid | short film, 14 minutes |
| Talking about Amy | Talking about Amy | 2008 | Japan/US | Yorico Murakami (村上依子) | animated short, 8 minutes; documentary about manga artists Rica Takashima and Emi Iijima (飯島永美) |
| A Tulip of Violet | A Tulip of Violet | 2007 | Japan | Yūmi Andō (安藤優美) | short film, 26 minutes; Rainbow Reel Competition winner |
| Where We Began | | 2006 | US | Marc Saltarelli | short film, 14 minutes |

=== 17th Festival (2008) ===
Festival reference

| English title | Original title | Year | Country | Director(s) | Notes |
|---|---|---|---|---|---|
| Bangkok Love Story | เพื่อน...กูรักมึงว่ะ | 2007 | Thailand | Poj Arnon | |
| Boystown | Chuecatown | 2007 | Spain | Juan Flahn | |
| Breakfast with Scot | | 2007 | Canada | Laurie Lynd | |
| Drifting Flowers | 漂浪青春 | 2008 | Taiwan | Zero Chou | |
| Freeheld | | 2007 | US | Cynthia Wade | documentary |
| Here's Looking at You, Boy | Schau mir in die Augen, Kleiner | 2007 | Germany/Netherlands/Finland/Australia | André Schäfer | documentary |
| A Jihad for Love | | 2007 | US | Parvez Sharma | documentary |
| Kiss the Bride | | 2007 | US | C. Jay Cox | |
| A Lez in Wonderland | Broute-minou à Palm Springs | 2006 | France | Anna Margarita Albelo | documentary; TV film |
| Looking for Cheyenne | Oublier Cheyenne | 2005 | France | Valérie Minetto | |
| Love Songs | Les Chansons d'amour | 2007 | France | Christophe Honoré | |
| Moon Shadow | 月のかげ Tsuki no kage | 2007 | Japan | Ryūhei Yoshino (吉野竜平) | |
| Nina's Heavenly Delights | | 2006 | UK | Pratibha Parmar | |
| No Regret | 후회하지 않아 | 2006 | South Korea | Leesong Hee-il | |
| Out at the Wedding | | 2007 | US | Lee Friedlander | |
| Shelter | | 2007 | US | Jonah Markowitz | |
| Shelter Me | Riparo – Anis tra di noi | 2007 | Italy/France | Marco S. Puccioni | |
| Strange Couples | 特異なカップル Tokui na kappuru | 2008 | Japan | Takuya Matsumoto (松本卓也) | |
| Suddenly, Last Winter | Improvvisamente l'inverno scorso | 2008 | Italy | Gustav Hofer; Luca Ragazzi | documentary |
| Were the World Mine | | 2008 | US | Tom Gustafson | |
| blue seeds | 青い種 Aoi tane | 2007 | Japan | Hiroki Kawano (川野弘毅) | short film, 25 minutes |
| Dirty Love | | 2006 | US | Michael Tringe | short film, 6 minutes |
| A Family Portrait | Un Retrato de Familia | 2004 | Singapore | Boo Junfeng | short film, 9 minutes |
| Filled with Water | | 2006 | Australia | Elka Kerkhofs | animated short, 5 minutes |
| Flatmates | Kompisar | 2007 | Sweden/Norway | Magnus Mork | short film, 21 minutes |
| Fragile in Love: Poetry in Motion | 沿海岸線徵友 | 2007 | Taiwan | Mickey Chen | short film, 14 minutes |
| HiBi-Chan | HiBi-Chan ひびちゃん | 2008 | Japan | HiBi-PaPa (ヒビパパ) | animated short, 4 minutes |
| It Seems to Rain | 少年不戴花 | 2007 | Taiwan | Allen Tsai | short film, 7 minutes |
| Just | | 2007 | US | David Maurice Gil | short film, 12 minutes |
| Katong Fugue | 加東賦格曲 | 2006 | Singapore | Boo Junfeng | short film, 10 minutes |
| Love Is Love | | 2007 | US | Anne Renton | short film, 7 minutes |
| Lloyd Neck | | 2008 | US | Benedict Campbell | short film, 16 minutes |
| MR_RIGHT_22 | | 2007 | Germany | Reza Rameri | short film, 12 minutes |
| Othello | オセロ Osero | 2006 | Japan | Kiyoshi Tanada (棚田清) | short film, 2 minutes |
| Private Life | | 2006 | UK | Abbe Robinson | short film, 16 minutes |
| San-Kaku | △サンカク Sankaku | 2008 | Japan | Kazuki Watanabe (渡辺一樹) | short film, 25 minutes; Rainbow Reel Competition winner |
| Serene Hunter | | 2006 | France/US | Jason Bushman | short film, 13 minutes |
| Sugar in the Blood | Zucker im Blut | 2005 | Germany | Reza Rameri | short film, 13 minutes |
| Ten Years After | 十年後 Jūnengo | 2007 | Japan | Takayuki Igarashi (五十嵐貴行) | short film, 9 minutes |
| When I Become Silent | わたしが沈黙するとき Watashi ga chinmoku suru toki | 2007 | Japan | Hyōe Yamamoto (山本兵衛) | short film, 18 minutes; Special Jury Award winner |
| Who's the Top? | | 2005 | US | Jennie Livingston | short film, 23 minutes |

=== 18th Festival (2009) ===
Festival reference

| English title | Original title | Year | Country | Director(s) | Notes |
|---|---|---|---|---|---|
| And Then Came Lola | | 2009 | US | Ellen Seidler; Megan Siler | |
| Baby Love | Comme les autres | 2008 | France | Vincent Garenq | |
| Candy Rain | 愛情糖果雨; 花吃了那女孩 | 2008 | Taiwan | Chen Hung-I | |
| Chef's Special | Fuera de carta | 2008 | Spain | Nacho García Velilla | |
| City of Borders | | 2009 | US | Yun Suh | documentary |
| Drool | | 2009 | US | Nancy Kissam | |
| End of Love | 愛到盡 | 2009 | Hong Kong/China | Simon Chung | |
| An Englishman in New York | | 2009 | UK | Richard Laxton | |
| I Can't Think Straight | | 2007 | UK/US/India | Shamim Sarif | |
| The New World | Le nouveau monde | 2007 | France | Étienne Dhaene | TV film |
| Outrage | | 2009 | US | Kirby Dick | documentary |
| Patrik, Age 1.5 | Patrik 1,5 | 2008 | Sweden | Ella Lemhagen | |
| Pheasant's Eyes | 福寿草 Fukujusō | 1935 | Japan | Jirō Kawate (川手二郎) | silent film |
| A Place to Live: The Story of Triangle Square | | 2008 | US | Carolyn Coal | documentary; Outfest 2008 Audience Award winner |
| My Friend from Faro | Mein Freund aus Faro | 2008 | Germany | Nana Neul | |
| Tru Loved | | 2008 | US | Stewart Wade | |
| With My Boyfriend | Avec mon copain | 2008 | France | Antonio de Oliveira | |
| The Casuarina Cove | 叢林灣 Tanjong rhu | 2008 | Singapore | Boo Junfeng | short film, 19 minutes |
| A Day at the Beach | | 2008 | US | Veronique Courtois | short animation, 3 minutes |
| Dolls | | 2008 | US | Randy Caspersen | short film, 10 minutes |
| Donkeygirl | Donkeygirl | 2006 | Netherlands | Ties Schenk | short film, 13 minutes |
| Flowers at the Park | Flores en el parque | 2006 | Spain | Mariel Macia | short film, 10 minutes |
| Getting to Know You | | 2005 | US | Liz Lachman | short film, 20 minutes |
| Homosexuality and Television | 竜超の現代狂養講座 同性愛とテレビジョン; Ryū Susumu no gendai kyōyō kōza dōseiai to terebijon | 2009 | Japan | akaboshi | documentary short, 25 minutes |
| Kali Ma | काली माँ | 2007 | US/India | Soman Chainani | short film, 14 minutes |
| My First Time Driving | | 2007 | US | Rebecca Feldman | short film, 18 minutes |
| Operated by Invisible Hands | | 2007 | US | Nicole Brending | short film, 7 minutes |
| The Others | | 2008 | Canada | Aram Collier | short film, 9 minutes; starring Lou Diamond Phillips |
| Sex Candy | Sex Candy | 2009 | Japan | Ayumi Susukida (薄田歩美) | short animation, 1 minute |
| Sweet Sweet Virgin | 童貞かわいや | 2003 | Japan | Kōjirō Shishido (宍戸幸次郎) | short film, 6 minutes |
| A Teenager in Love | A teenager in love | 2009 | Japan | Yūichi Suita (吹田祐一) | short film, 16 minutes |
| Trophy | | 2008 | US | Karla DiBenedetto | short film, 10 minutes |
| Twoyoungmen, UT. | | 2008 | US | Sam McConnell | short film, 17 minutes |

=== 19th Festival (2010) ===
Festival reference

| English title | Original title | Year | Country | Director(s) | Notes |
|---|---|---|---|---|---|
| And Then Came Lola | | 2009 | US | Ellen Seidler; Megan Siler | |
| The Four-Faced Liar | | 2010 | US | Jacob Chase | |
| Hollywood, je t'aime | | 2009 | US | Jason Bushman | |
| Mariko Rose the Spook | おばけのマリコローズ Obake no Mariko Rōzu | 2009 | Japan | Debi Kobayashi | |
| Miao Miao | 渺渺 | 2008 | Hong Kong/Taiwan | Hsiao-tse Cheng | |
| Oy Vey! My Son Is Gay!! | | 2009 | US | Evgeny Afineevsky | |
| Regretters | Ångrarna | 2010 | Sweden | Marcus Lindeen | |
| Secret | とある放課後に To aru hōkago ni | 2009 | Japan | Takeshi Matsuura | |
| A Single Man | | 2009 | US | Tom Ford | |
| Spring Fever | 春风沉醉的晚上 | 2009 | China/Hong Kong/France | Lou Ye | |
| The Topp Twins: Untouchable Girls | | 2009 | New Zealand | Leanne Pooley | documentary |
| Undertow | Contracorriente | 2009 | Peru/Colombia/France/Germany | Javier Fuentes-León | |
| Birthday | Födelsedag | 2010 | Sweden/Poland | Jenifer Malmqvist | short film, 18 minutes |
| Cloudy Than Fair | Cloudy than fair | 2010 | Japan | Marie Sakamoto (坂本まりえ) | short film, 11 minutes |
| Diavolo | Diavolo | 2009 | Japan | Meiko Amano (天野芽衣子) | short film, 8 minutes |
| Evelyn Everyone | | 2009 | Australia | Kylie Plunkett | short film, 17 minutes |
| Friends | 友達 Tomodachi | 2010 | Japan | Manabu Oda (小田学) | short film, 13 minutes |
| Girl Talk | | 2008 | US | Jennifer Smith | short film, 7 minutes |
| The Golden Pin | | 2009 | Canada | Cuong Ngo | short film, 16 minutes |
| I'm Just Anneke | | 2010 | US/Canada | Jonathan Skurnik | short film, 11 minutes |
| Jellyfish Boy | くらげくん Kurage-kun | 2009 | Japan | Shō Kataoka (片岡翔) | short film, 14 minutes; Rainbow Reel Competition winner |
| Just Friends? | 친구사이? | 2009 | South Korea | Kim Jho Kwang-soo | short film, 29 minutes |
| Koiseyo Otome | 恋せよ乙女 Koiseyo otome | 2009 | Japan | Yoshitomi X Saii (吉富×saii) | short film, 5 minutes |
| La forêt de Rachel D'Amour | | 2010 | Japan | Rachel D'Amour | short film, 14 minutes |
| A Little Tiger | En liten tiger | 2006 | Sweden | Anna Carin Andersson | short film, 29 minutes |
| No Bikini | | 2007 | Canada | Claudia Morgado Escanilla | short film, 9 minutes |
| Peking Turkey | | 2006 | Canada | Michael Mew | short film, 12.5 minutes |
| Revelations | | 2009 | US | Tom Gustafson | short film, 9 minutes |
| A Tea-grown Flower | この花は紅茶で出来ている Kono hana wa kōcha de dekiteiru | 2010 | Japan | Yōko Yūsa (遊佐蓉子) | short film, 24 minutes |
| Teddy | | 2009 | New Zealand | Christopher Banks | short film, 13 minutes |

=== 20th Festival (2011) ===
Festival reference

| English title | Original title | Year | Country | Director(s) | Notes |
|---|---|---|---|---|---|
| Bloomington | | 2010 | US | Fernanda Cardoso | |
| Coming Out Story | カミング アウト ストーリー | 2011 | Japan | Kei Umezawa | |
| Eating Out 5: The Open Weekend | | 2011 | US | Q. Allan Brocka | |
| Going Down in LA-LA Land | | 2011 | US | Casper Andreas | |
| Kaboom | | 2010 | US/France | Gregg Araki | |
| Romeos | Romeos ...anders als du denkst! | 2011 | Germany | Sabine Bermardi | |
| The Secret Diaries of Miss Anne Lister | | 2010 | UK | James Kent | |
| Tomboy | | 2011 | France | Céline Sciamma | |
| We Were Here | | 2011 | US | David Weissman | documentary |
| Wish Me Away | | 2011 | US | Bobbie Birleffi; Beverly Kopf | documentary |

=== 21st Festival (2012) ===
Festival reference

| English title | Original title | Year | Country | Director(s) | Notes |
|---|---|---|---|---|---|
| Cloudburst | | 2011 | Canada | Thom Fitzgerald | |
| Gayby | | 2012 | US | Jonathan Lisecki | |
| Kiss Me | Kyss mig | 2011 | Sweden | Alexandra-Therese Keining | also known as With Every Heartbeat |
| Margarita | | 2012 | Canada | Dominique Cardona, Laurie Colbert | |
| Men to Kiss | Männer zum knutschen | 2012 | Germany | Robert Hasfogel | |
| North Sea Texas | Noordzee, Texas | 2012 | Belgium | Bavo Defurne | |
| Vito | | 2011 | US | Jeffrey Schwarz | documentary |
| Weekend | | 2011 | UK | Andrew Haigh | |
| Encore | 再演一齣戲 | 2011 | Taiwan | Anthony Lian (練健輝) | short film, 32 minutes |
| Fly by Night | 야간비행 Ya-gan-bi-hang | 2011 | South Korea | Tae-Gyum Son (손태겸) | short film, 21 minutes |
| From Here to There | 赤鱲角到天水圍是我愛你最佳距離 | 2012 | Hong Kong | Norris Wong (黄綺琳) | short film, 29 minutes |
| Heart Break Sprinter | 失恋スプリンター Shitsukoi supurintā | 2011 | Japan | Naoya Asanuma (浅沼直也) | short film, 25 minutes |
| Quite Ordinary | ごくごくふつーのっ！Goku-goku futsū no! | 2011 | Japan | Studio LUNCHBOX | short film, 16 minutes |
| Thus a Noise Speaks | ノイズが言うには Noizu ga yuu ni wa | 2010 | Japan | Kaori Oda (小田香) | short film, 38 minutes |
| Tsuyako | TSUYAKO | 2011 | Japan/US | Mitsuyo Miyazaki (宮崎光代) | short film, 25 minutes; Rainbow Reel Competition winner |
| You Used to Smile That Way | 그렇게 웃어주던 니가 | 2009 | South Korea | Park Sun (박 선) | short film, 13 minutes |

=== 22nd Festival (2013) ===
Festival reference

| English title | Original title | Year | Country | Director(s) | Notes |
|---|---|---|---|---|---|
| Getting Go, the Go Doc Project | | 2013 | US | Cory James Krueckeberg | documentary |
| I Am Divine | | 2013 | US | Jeffrey Schwarz | documentary |
| I Do | | 2012 | US | Glenn Gaylord | |
| Intersexion | | 2012 | New Zealand | Grant Lahood | documentary |
| Lengua Materna | Lengua materna | 2010 | Argentina | Liliana Paolinelli | |
| Mosquita y Mari | | 2012 | US | Aurora Guerrero | |
| Mr. Angel | | 2013 | US | Dan Hunt | documentary feature about trans man Buck Angel |
| No Look Pass | | 2011 | US | Melissa Johnson | |
| Out in the Dark | עלטה | 2012 | Israel | Michael Mayer | |
| Will You Still Love Me Tomorrow? | 明天記得愛上我 Ming tian ji de ai shang wo | 2013 | Taiwan | Arvin Chen | |
| Yossi | הסיפור של יוסי Ha-Sippur Shel Yossi | 2012 | Israel | Eytan Fox | |
| Coffee & Pie | | 2012 | US | Douglas Horn | short film, 15 minutes |
| Daniël | Daniël | 2012 | Netherlands | Vincent Fitz-Jim | short film, 8 minutes |
| Deep Down Ballet | Jetzt aber Ballett | 2011 | Germany | Isabell Suba | short film, 29 minutes |
| Do You, Andy... | 你願意了嗎？ | 2012 | Taiwan | Arvin Chen | short film, 6 minutes; for the Taiwan LGBT Pride 2012 |
| Do You Have a Cat? | | 2011 | US | Jason Sax | short film, 11 minutes |
| Doctor Glamour | | 2012 | US | Andrew Jones | short film, 14 minutes |
| Dol | 돌 | 2011 | US | Andrew Ahn | short film, 11 minutes |
| FtM | FtM 僕はまだ自分を呼ぶ言葉を知らない; FtM boku-wa mada jibun wo yobu kotoba wo shiranai | 2011 | Japan | Hideki Katō (加藤秀樹) | short film, 30 minutes |
| Goodbye Billy the Kid | ビリーザキッドの最期の弾丸 Birīzakiddo no saigo no tama | 2013 | Japan | Kazuki Watanabe | short film, 28 minutes |
| Hatch | | 2012 | Austria/US | Christoph Kuschnig | short film, 17 minutes |
| ippai oppai | きみのだっこ きみのおっぱい Kimi no dakko kimi no oppai | 2012 | Japan | Kana Miyazaki (宮﨑加奈) | short film, 17 minutes |
| The Lesson | ザ・レッスン Za ressun | 2011 | Japan | Paul Metz, David Chester | short film, 15 minutes |
| A Night in the Woods | | 2012 | US | Alexander L. Lee | short film, 8 minutes |
| Polaroid Girl | | 2012 | US | April Maxey | short film, 17 minutes |
| Sabbatical | | 2012 | US | Glenn Kiser | short film, 12 minutes |
| Slow | | 2011 | US | Darius Clark Monroe | short film, 13 minutes |
| Turn On | TURN ON | 2013 | Japan | Minoru Nakano | short film, 1 minute |
| Undress Me | Ta av mig | 2012 | Sweden | Victor Lindgren | short film, 12 minutes; won 2013 Teddy Award for Best Short Film |

=== 23rd Festival (2014) ===
Festival reference

| English title | Original title | Year | Country | Director(s) | Notes |
|---|---|---|---|---|---|
| 52 Tuesdays | | 2013 | Australia | Sophie Hyde | |
| Anita's Last Cha-Cha | Ang Huling Cha-Cha ni Anita | 2013 | Philippines | Sigrid Andrea P. Bernardo | |
| Broken Pieces | こっぱみじん Koppamijin | 2013 | Japan | Yūji Tajiri | |
| The Case Against 8 | | 2013 | US | Ben Cotner, Ryan White | documentary |
| Coming Out | カミングアウト Kaminguauto | 2014 | Japan | Kazutoshi Inudō (犬童一利) | |
| Concussion | | 2013 | US | Stacie Passon | |
| Free Fall | Freier Fall | 2013 | Germany | Stephan Lacant | |
| G.B.F. | | 2013 | US | Darren Stein | |
| Hawaii | | 2013 | Argentina | Marco Berger | |
| Stranger by the Lake | L'Inconnu du lac | 2013 | France | Alain Guiraudie | |
| Who's Afraid of Vagina Wolf? | | 2013 | US | Anna Margarita Albelo | |
| A Belgian Caper | Histoire belge | 2012 | France | Myriam Donasis | short film, 25 minutes |
| esola | エソラ Esora | 2013 | Japan | Akiyoshi Tanaka (田中昭全) | short film, 25 minutes |
| Keepsake | Keepsake (青い鶴) Keepsake (Aoi tsuru) | 2013 | Japan | David Chester | short film, 15 minutes |
| Kiyumi's Poetry and Sayuru's Embroidery | キユミの詩集 サユルの刺繍 Kiyumi no shishū Sayuru no shishū | 2010 | Japan | Satoru Sugita (杉田愉) | short film, 30 minutes |
| The Other Side of a Smiling Face | 笑顔の向こう側 Egao no mukōgawa | 2013 | Japan | Yoshiaki Sajima (佐島由昭) | short film, 43 minutes; Rainbow Reel Competition winner |
| Performing Girl | | 2013 | US | Crescent Diamond | short film, 25 minutes |
| Ronny & I | | 2013 | US | Guy Shalem | short film, 21 minutes |
| Summer Vacation | חופש גדול | 2012 | Israel | Tal Granit, Sharon Maymon | short film, 22 minutes |

=== 24th Festival (2015) ===
Festival reference

| English title | Original title | Year | Country | Director(s) | Notes |
|---|---|---|---|---|---|
| Appropriate Behavior | Appropriate Behaviour | 2014 | UK (US) | Desiree Akhavan | |
| Boy Meets Girl | | 2014 | US | Eric Schaeffer | |
| Candy Boys | お江戸のキャンディー O Edo no kyandī | 2014 | Japan | Leona Hirota (広田レオナ) | |
| The Circle | Der Kreis | 2014 | Switzerland | Stefan Haupt | |
| Eat with Me | | 2014 | US | David Au | |
| In the Absence of the Sun | Selamat Pagi, Malam | 2014 | Indonesia | Lucky Kuswandi | |
| Night Flight | 야간비행 Yaganbihaeng | 2014 | Korea | Leesong Hee-il | |
| Starting Over | Starting Over | 2014 | Japan | Takashi Nishihara (西原孝至) | |
| We Came to Sweat: The Legend of Starlite | | 2014 | US | Kate Kunath, Sasha Wortzel | documentary |
| Xenia | Ξενία | 2014 | Greece, France, Belgium | Panos H. Koutras | |
| The Year We Thought About Love | | 2014 | US | Ellen Brodsky | documentary |
| 100 Apples | 蘋果男孩 | 2014 | Taiwan | Chia-Yao Wang (王嘉耀) | short film, 28 minutes |
| Alone With People | | 2014 | US | Drew Van Steenbergen | short film, 30 minutes |
| Brace | | 2013 | UK | Sophy Holland, Alicia Eyo | short film, 30 minutes |
| Crack | あかぎれ Akagire | 2014 | Japan | Kazutoshi Inudo (犬童一利) | short film, 19 minutes |
| From the Bottom of the Vortex | 私は渦の底から Watashi wa uzumaki no soko kara | 2015 | Japan | Kozue Nomoto (野本梢) | short film, 27 minutes; Rainbow Reel Competition winner |
| Leave Us Alone | leave us alone | 2015 | Japan | Ai Hamasaki (濱崎藍) | short film, 34 minutes |
| Life of Silence | 犧牲之旅 | 2014 | Taiwan | Cheng-Ru Yin (應政儒) | short film, 27 minutes |
| My Own Void | My own void | 2014 | Japan | Takashi Matsuyama (松山昂史) | short film, 7 minutes |
| Penguins at North Pole | 海倫她媽 | 2013 | Taiwan | Kassey C.M. Huang (黄靖閔) | short film, 30 minutes |
| Phantom Jenny | ファントム・ジェニー Fantomu Jenī | 2015 | Japan | Kazuomi Makita (マキタカズオミ) | short film, 29 minutes |
| Please Let Me Marry Your Daughter | 娘さんを僕にください Musume-san wo ore ni kudasai | 2015 | Japan | Hiroki Fujimoto (藤本裕貴) | short film, 15 minutes |
| The Return | Le Retour | 2013 | France | Yohann Kouam | short film, 22 minutes |
| San Cristóbal | | 2015 | Chile | Omar Zúñiga Hidalgo | short film, 29 minutes |

=== 25th Festival (2016) ===
Festival reference

| English title | Original title | Year | Country | Director(s) | Notes |
|---|---|---|---|---|---|
| The Duke of Burgundy | | 2014 | UK/Hungary | Peter Strickland | |
| First Girl I Loved | | 2015 | US | Kerem Sanga | |
| From Afar | Desde allá | 2015 | Venezuela/Mexico | Lorenzo Vigas | |
| The High Heel Revolution! (High Heels Revolution!) | ハイヒール革命！ Haihīru kakumei! | 2015 | Japan | Yō Kohatsu (古波津陽) | documentary |
| How to Win at Checkers (Every Time) | พี่ชาย My Hero | 2015 | Thailand/US/Indonesia | Josh Kim | |
| Gayby Baby | | 2015 | Australia | Maya Newell | documentary |
| Girls Lost | Pojkarna | 2015 | Sweden | Alexandra-Therese Keining | |
| The Living End | | 2008 | US | Gregg Araki | |
| Mysterious Skin | | 2004 | US | Gregg Araki | |
| Paris 05:59: Théo & Hugo | Théo et Hugo dans le même bateau | 2016 | France | Olivier Ducastel, Jacques Martineau | |
| Summertime | La Belle Saison | 2015 | France/Belgium | Catherine Corsini | |
| West North West | 西北西 Sei hoku sei | 2015 | Japan | Takuro Nakamura (中村拓朗) | |
| The Fox Exploits the Tiger's Might | 狐假虎威 | 2015 | Indonesia | Lucky Kuswandi | short film, 24 minutes |
| I Go To School Not By Bus | 放肆 | 2015 | Hong Kong | Morris Ng (吳燧靈) | short film, 35 minutes |
| Sowol Road | 소월길 | 2014 | Korea | Shin Jong-hun (신종훈) | short film, 25 minutes |
| When Mom Visits | | 2015 | Taiwan/US | Chiung-wen Chang (張瓊文) | short film, 19 minutes |

=== 26th Festival (2017) ===
Festival reference

| English title | Original title | Year | Country | Director(s) | Notes |
|---|---|---|---|---|---|
| Being 17 | Quand on a 17 ans | 2016 | France | André Téchiné | |
| Below Her Mouth | | 2016 | Canada | April Mullen | |
| Center of My World | Die Mitte der Welt | 2016 | Germany/Austria | Jakob M. Erwa | |
| A Date for Mad Mary | | 2016 | Ireland | Darren Thornton | |
| Fathers | FATHERS (ฟาเธอร์ส) | 2016 | Thailand | Palatpol Mingpornpichit (พลัฏฐ์พล มิ่งพรพิชิต) | |
| I Am What I Am. – Over the Rainbow – | 私はワタシ〜over the rainbow〜 Watashi-wa watashi | 2017 | Japan | Genki Masuda (増田玄樹) | documentary |
| Kiki | | 2016 | Sweden/US | Sara Jordenö | documentary |
| Maybe Tomorrow | Baka Bukas | 2016 | Philippines | Samantha Lee | |
| Signature Move | | 2017 | US | Jennifer Reeder | |
| Tale of the Lost Boys | | 2017 | Taiwan/Philippines | Joselito Altarejos | |
| You Are the Sea | きみは海 Kimi-wa umi | 2016 | Japan | Tomoko Takahashi (高橋知子) | |
| Any Other Day | | 2016 | India | Srikant Ananthkrishnan, Vikrant Dhote | short film, 12 minutes |
| Are You Really Umekichi? | お前、本当に梅吉か？ O-mae, hontō-ni Umekichi ka? | 2014 | Japan | Naomi Takayama (高山直美) | short film, 23 minutes |
| The Baby Lu'au | | 2016 | US | Jana Park Moore | short film, 16 minutes |
| Chromosome Sweetheart | 染色体の恋人 Senshokutai no koibito | 2017 | Japan | Honami Yano (矢野ほなみ) | short film, 5 minutes |
| The Dam | | 2016 | Australia | Brendon McDonall | short film, 16 minutes |
| Dearest | いとしいひと Itoshii hito | 2016 | Japan | Kana Maruyama (丸山夏奈) | short film, 19 minutes |
| Eternal Sky | 君と違う空は見たくない Kimi to chigau sora wa mitakunai | 2016 | Japan | Yūta Nagahama (長濱勇太) | short film, 20 minutes |
| Heart Station | | 2016 | US/China | Tao Jia | short film, 17 minutes |
| Kalanchoe | カランコエの花 Karankoe no hana | 2017 | Japan | Shun Nakagawa (中川駿) | short film, 39 minutes |
| Katchi | کچی | 2016 | Pakistan | Amina Malik | short film, 14 minutes |
| Momo | 두유 테이크 디스 캣? | 2016 | Korea | Jang Yoon-Ju (장윤주) | short film, 15 minutes |
| Spring Like Lovers | 春みたいだ Haru mitai da | 2017 | Japan | Daisuke Shigaya (シガヤダイスケ) | short film, 31 minutes |

=== 27th Festival (2018) ===
Festival reference

| English title | Original title | Year | Country | Director(s) | Notes |
|---|---|---|---|---|---|
| After Louie | | 2017 | US | Vincent Gagliostro | |
| Alifu, the Prince/ss | 阿莉芙 | 2017 | Taiwan | Yu-Lin Wang (王育麟) | |
| Freelancers Anonymous | | 2017 | US | Sonia Sebastián | |
| God's Own Country | | 2017 | UK | Francis Lee | |
| In Between | بَر بَحَر (Bar Bahar); לא פה, לא שם | 2016 | Israel/France | Maysaloun Hamoud | |
| In Between Seasons | 환절기 | 2016 | South Korea | Lee Dong-eun (이동은) | |
| LiFeTiMe | イッショウガイ Isshōgai | 2017 | Japan | Aoto Tani (谷碧仁) | |
| Princess Cyd | | 2017 | US | Stephen Cone | |
| The Wound | Inxeba | 2017 | South Africa/France/Germany | John Trengove | |
| Until Rainbow Dawn | 虹色の朝が来るまで Nijiiro-no asa-ga kuru made | 2018 | Japan | Mika Imai (今井ミカ) | |
| Venus | | 2017 | Canada | Eisha Marjara | |
| Cocoon | 茧 | 2017 | China | LiYing Mei (梅俪潆) | short film, 26 minutes |
| First Day | | 2018 | Australia | Julie Kalceff | short film, 18 minutes |
| Freedom | フリーダム Furīdamu | 2018 | Japan | Ayaka Furukawa (古川彩圭) | short film, 3 minutes |
| Garconne – The Woman Having Both Sexes | ギャルソンヌ −2つの性をもつ女− Gyarusonnu –Futatsu-no sei-wo motsu onna– | 2017 | Japan | Mayu Akiyama (穐山茉由) | short film, 31 minutes |
| HIV x LOVE ? | HIV x LOVE ? | 2017 | Japan | Katsuhide Yamago (山後勝英) | short film, 10 minutes |
| Kiss | KISS | 2018 | Japan | Ryō Ōmura (大村諒) | short film, 8 minutes |
| Looking For? | 你找什麼? | 2017 | Taiwan | Tung-yen Chou (周東彥) | |
| Miyako | 京 Miyako | 2017 | Japan | Yua Nakada (中田侑杏) | short film, 16 minutes |
| Old Narcissus | 老ナルキソス Rō Narukisosu | 2017 | Japan | Tsuyoshi Shōji (東海林毅) | short film, 21 minutes; Rainbow Reel Competition winner |
| Sisak | | 2017 | India | Faraz Arif Ansari | short film, 15 minutes |

== See also ==
- List of LGBT film festivals
