= Frameline Audience Award – Best Feature =

Award of the San Francisco Frameline Film Festival

The Frameline Audience Award – Best Feature is an award of the San Francisco Frameline Film Festival. Since the festival's inception in 1984 the Best Feature Film has been awarded by the festival's audience selection.

== Winners ==
Year	Film	Director	Country of origin	Ref
1984	Angel	Robert Vincent O'Neil	United States	
1985	Broken Mirrors (Gebroken spiegels)	Marleen Gorris	Netherlands	
1986	Westler	Wieland Speck	West Germany	
1987	Law of Desire (La ley del deseo)	Pedro Almodóvar	Spain	
1988	Friends Forever (Venner for altid)	Stefan Henszelman	Denmark	
1989	The Heart Exposed (Le Cœur découvert)	Jean-Yves Laforce	Canada	
1990	Oranges Are Not the Only Fruit	Beeban Kidron	United Kingdom	
1991	Together Alone	P. J. Castellaneta	United States	
1992	The Twin Bracelets	Huang Yu-shan	Hong Kong	
1993	Grief	Richard Glatzer	United States	
1994	Only the Brave	Ana Kokkinos	Australia	
1994	World and Time Enough	Eric Mueller	United States	
1995	Costa Brava	Marta Balletbò-Coll	Spain	
1995	Parallel Sons	John G. Young	United States	
1996	Stonewall	Nigel Finch	United States	
1997	Lilies	John Greyson	Canada	
1998	Edge of Seventeen	David Moreton	United States	
1999	Chutney Popcorn	Nisha Ganatra	United States	
2000	Big Eden	Thomas Bezucha	United States	
2001	The Iron Ladies	Yongyoot Thongkongtoon	Thailand	
2002	The Business of Fancydancing	Sherman Alexie	United States	
2003	Yes Nurse! No Nurse!	Pieter Kramer	Netherlands	
2004	Brother to Brother	Rodney Evans	United States	
2005	Transamerica	Duncan Tucker	United States	
2006	The Gymnast	Ned Farr	United States	
2007	Four Minutes (Vier Minuten)	Chris Kraus	Germany	
2008	XXY	Lucía Puenzo	Argentina	
2009	Patrik, Age 1.5	Ella Lemhagen	Sweden	
2010	The String	Mehdi Ben Attia	France	
2011	Tomboy	Céline Sciamma	France	
2012	Cloudburst	Thom Fitzgerald	Canada	
2013	Reaching for the Moon	Bruno Barreto	Brazil	
2014	The Way He Looks	Daniel Ribeiro	Brazil	
2015	Margarita with a Straw	Shonali Bose	India	
2016	Pushing Dead	Tom E. Brown	United States	
2017	God's Own Country	Francis Lee	United Kingdom	
2018	For Izzy	Alex Chu	United States	
2019	Song Lang	Leon Le	Vietnam	
2020	Rūrangi	Max Currie	New Zealand	
2021	Lola (Lola vers la mer)	Laurent Micheli	Belgium, France	
2022	Vulveeta	Maria Breaux	United States	
2023	The Origin of Evil (L'Origine du mal)	Sébastien Marnier	France, Canada	
2024	All Shall Be Well	Ray Yeung	Hong Kong	
