= Desiree Lim =

Independent filmmaker

- Born: 1971 (age 54–55); Malaysia
- Education: Sophia University
- Occupation: Filmmaker
- Years active: 1994–present

Desiree Lim (born 1971) is a Malaysian-born Canadian independent film director, producer, and screenwriter. She is known for her films Sugar Sweet (2001), Floored by Love (2005), and The House (2011). Lim tends to work within the realm of family drama and comedy, and highlights themes of lesbianism, multiculturalism, and body positivity. She now works in Canada and Japan.

== Early life and education ==
Born in Malaysia in 1971, Lim grew up speaking Cantonese and Mandarin. Her parents are Chinese and had moved to her birthplace from mainland China and Hong Kong. In school, she became a skilled kendo practitioner. Upon graduating from high school, she moved to Tokyo to study at Sophia University, where she received her Bachelor of Arts degree in Journalism. After finishing university, she began working on news and documentary films with the broadcasting company Asahi Broadcasting Network in Tokyo as an associate producer and director. She did not move back to Malaysia after her education, due to the lack of freedom of the press there.

== Career ==
Lim made her first independent short film, Closet is for Clothes, in Tokyo, where it was shown at the 1995 Tokyo Lesbian and Gay Film Festival. This festival provided Lim with the opportunity to jump-start her career, as she received an award for her film. This was the beginning of her career as an independent filmmaker. Six years later she created her first feature-length film, Sugar Sweet, in which she described her coming out as a queer filmmaker. Following the release of this film, she moved to Vancouver, British Columbia, Canada, having been frustrated by the production company's marketing of Sugar Sweet and inspired by the positive reaction it received in North America, particularly by Vancouver's artistic community. Her films have been highly successful at film festivals, where showings have frequently sold out. Her latest film, a psychological thriller set in Vancouver and featuring Vancouver actors, called The House (2011), received the Best Canadian Feature Film award at the 2012 Female Eye Film Festival.

=== Notable films ===
==== Sugar Sweet (2001) ====
Perhaps Lim's most popular work, Sugar Sweet is an erotic comedy that plays with the straight male ideas of what lesbian porn looks like. It is the first erotic film in Japan that was both made for and by queer women. Starring Saori Kitagawa as Naomi, this film follows the story of a lesbian filmmaker who is hired by a straight porn company to create authentic lesbian films, only to have them deemed "too artistic". She is instructed to take a more conventional pornographic route. The film takes on techniques such as the full–body shot and blur to appeal to the "lesbian gaze" rather than the male gaze. Sugar Sweet was originally released in Japan and was meant to be marketed as having been created by a queer woman for other queer women. Despite this, advertising for the film switched to target heterosexual men, using fetishistic images of lesbians, as there was thought to be a bigger market for the film in this demographic. The film was well-received in North America, where screenings of up to 600 people were sold out. It was shown in various cities with prolific queer film festivals, and was also featured in over 50 film festivals in North America. The marketing gimmicks and the film's success in North America were both significant factors in Lim's decision to move to Vancouver in 2002.

==== Floored By Love (2005) ====
This work by Lim was a part of the Eight Stories About Love series on the Canadian television network Citytv. A comedic family drama, it tells the story of a multicultural queer relationship between two women, and the issues they face when the parents of the protagonist, Cara, visit, and later when they come out as a couple. Written after the legalization of same-sex marriage, it deals with issues of marriage, Asian diaspora, gender performance, and coming out.

==== The House (2011) ====
The House is inspired by former Wall Street worker Nomi Prins, who exposed the fraudulence and failings of Wall Street. It looks at how working in the world of Wall Street has affected the protagonist, a woman named Jean. It is a cross-genre of drama, thriller, and the paranormal, as Jean must go on a journey of self-discovery. Upon quitting her high-level investment job, a friend lends her an empty house in Vancouver, where she encounters and interacts with the spirits who inhabit there. The House won Best Screenwriting and Best Performance at the Vancouver Women in Film Festival and was awarded Best Canadian Feature at the Female Eye Film Festival.

== Inspiration ==
From birth, Lim's identity as a transmigrant Asian woman influenced the way she saw the world. Though she was born and had lived in Malaysia, then later Japan, she seldom saw Asian faces represented in media during her childhood, declaring that all the faces on her TV screen were those of white people. This drove her to create her own representation of people like herself. Lim's goal with her works is to create more positive and diverse representations of Asian women, and to tell the stories of those with intersecting queer-Asian identities. Her inspiration is not derived from a role model, but rather the lack thereof in her life. The aim of her work is to challenge taboo topics and to empower her audience; in this regard, she considers her films to be forms of activism.

== Personal life ==
Lim is fluent in English, Japanese, Mandarin, Cantonese and Malay.

== Filmography ==
=== Film ===
- 1995: Closet is for Clothes
- 1999: Disposable Lez
- 1999: Dyke: Just Be It
- 2001: Eroticism
- 2003: Salty Wet – director (Short film)
- 2005: Out For Bubble Tea – director, producer, writer (Short film)
- 2005: Some Real Fangs – director, producer, writer (Short film)
- 2011: The House – director, producer, writer

=== Television ===
- 2001: Natural Mystery: Health & Hypnosis – associate producer (TV documentary)
- 2001: Sugar Sweet – director, writer (TV movie)
- 2005: Floored By Love – director, producer, writer (TV movie)

== See also ==
- List of female film and television directors
- List of lesbian filmmakers
- List of LGBT-related films directed by women
