= Ella Bella Bingo (film) =

2020 Norwegian computer-animated adventure comedy film

- Film poster
- Norwegian: Elleville Elfrid
- Directed by: Frank Mosvold; Atle Solberg Blakseth
- Written by: Frank Mosvold; Rob Sprackling; Johnny Smith
- Screenplay by: Frank Mosvold
- Based on: Ella Bella Bingo
- Music by: Marius Christiansen
- Production companies: Studio 100 Film; Spinville; Kool Produktion
- Distributed by: Scanbox Entertainment
- Release date: 24 January 2020
- Running time: 75 minutes
- Country: Norway
- Language: Norwegian
- Budget: NOK 1,350,000 ($164,213)
- Box office: $981,814

Ella Bella Bingo (Norwegian: Elleville Elfrid) is a 2020 Norwegian 3D animated adventure comedy film based on the preschool TV series of the same name. A joint-production between Studio 100 Film and Kool Produktion AS, the film is directed by Frank Mosvold and Atle Solberg Blakseth. It was released in Norway on 24 January 2020, and was a commercial success, grossing $626,491 over a $164,213 budget.

== Synopsis ==
Ella Bella and Henry are best friends, and plan on making a circus together, but when cool kid Johnny arrives in town he becomes Henry's new best friend, making Ella jealous and jeopardising the circus.

== Voice cast ==
- Summer Fontana as Ella Bella
- Jack Fisher as Henry
- Ben Plassala as Johnny
- Richard Kind as Mr. Jackson
- Tress MacNeille as Ms. Berg
- Cherokee Rose Castro as Lisa and Lottie
- Fred Tatasciore as Jurgen
- Katie Leigh as ticket girl
- Chris Sullivan as ice cream salesman
- Christopher Salazar as Ella's father
- Devin Hennessy as Henry's father
- Mara Junot as Henry's mother
- Lane Compton as Johnny's uncle
- Chris Anthony as Johnny's mother
- Stephen Weese as Johnny's father
- Brennan Murray as Hit the Can Man
- Henrik Lunden Tybakken as Rabbit

== Release ==
Ella Bella Bingo was released in Norway on 24 January 2020, with an opening of $177,849. It grossed $626,491 in Norway, and $355,323 in other countries, for a worldwide total of $981,814 against a budget of NOK 1,350,000 ($164,213), making it a commercial success.

The film was released on VOD and DVD in the United States on 24 March 2020.

=== Critical reception ===
The film received generally mixed to positive reviews from critics.
