= The Heart Exposed =

1987 Canadian film

- French: Le Cœur découvert
- Based on: The Heart Laid Bare (Le Cœur découvert) by Michel Tremblay
- Written by: Michel Tremblay
- Directed by: Jean-Yves Laforce
- Starring: Michel Poirier; Gilles Renaud
- Music by: Michel-Charles Therrien
- Country of origin: Canada
- Original language: French

Production
- Cinematography: Jean Pierre Lefebvre
- Editor: André Daigneault
- Running time: 106 minutes
- Production company: Société Radio-Canada

Original release
- Release: November 1987

The Heart Exposed (French: Le Cœur découvert) is a Canadian drama film, directed by Jean-Yves Laforce and released in 1987. Written by Michel Tremblay as an adaptation of his own novel The Heart Laid Bare (Le Cœur découvert), the film centres on the relationship between Jean-Marc (Gilles Renaud) and Mathieu (Michel Poirier), two gay men who meet and fall in love despite a ten-year age difference and the complication that Mathieu is the father of a five-year-old son.

The film's cast also includes Olivier Chasse, Louisette Dussault, Amulette Garneau, Louise Rinfret, Pierre Houle and Robert Lalonde.

The film premiered at the Montreal World Film Festival in 1987, but was distributed primarily as a television film broadcast by Télévision de Radio-Canada in November. It was later screened at the Frameline Film Festival in 1989, where it won the Audience Award.

Thomas Waugh, writing for Cinema Canada, stated that "It is a fine pleasure to see this warmhearted little gem, not only because of positive representation of gays in this year when everyone's gushing about Night Zoo, a violent misogynist derivative film that exults in queer-baiting and queer-smashing, but because one of our finest writers has made another all-too-rare visit to the screen."
