= Ella Bella Bingo =

Animated television series

- Also known as: Ella Bella; Sunshine Kathy
- Genre: Animation
- Created by: Frank Mosvold; Tom Peter Hansen; Trond Morten K. Venaasen
- Directed by: Ginger Gibbons
- Voices of: Gaia Ottman; Jamie Oram; Kirsten Llagan; Evelyn Rose McDermott; Giles New; Beth Chalmers; Jasmine Hood
- Composer: Andrew Hugget
- Countries of origin: Singapore; Norway
- No. of seasons: 3
- No. of episodes: 105

Production
- Executive producers: Jyotirmoy Saha; Frank Mosvold
- Running time: 6-7 minutes
- Production companies: August Media Holdings Pte Ltd; Kool Produktion AS

Original release
- Network: NRK
- Release: December 1, 2011 – December 4, 2014

Ella Bella Bingo is a pre-school animated television series, co-produced by Singapore-based August Media Holdings and Norway's Kool Produktion AS. The show revolves around the adventures of a 5-year-old girl named Ella, who lives in Sunshine Gardens, along with her family and friends.

The first 27 episodes of Ella Bella Bingo (previously known as Sunshine Kathy) were screened on NRK from 2010 until 2011.

The character was originally created in 2009 by illustrator Tom Petter Hansen, and the series was developed the same year by Hansen, scriptwriter Trond Morten K. Venaasen and producer Frank Mosvold. In 2011, the show was then redeveloped and re-designed by Jyotirmoy Saha of August Media Holdings.

As of 2014, 105 episodes of Ella Bella Bingo have been produced. The series, as of 2026, has been sold in more than 20 countries, including Sweden, Denmark, Finland, Ireland, Singapore, Indonesia, Taiwan, Turkey, Bangladesh, and all the Middle Eastern and North African countries.

== Background ==
Ella Bella Bingo is targeted at pre-school children. It follows the adventures of happy-go-lucky Ella and her friends. The series is a warm humorous mix of fun and laughter. Each 7-minute episode is about how Ella uses her boundless creativity, infectious enthusiasm, and a never-give-up attitude to solve everyday problems in innovative ways.

Ella Bella Bingo is directed by the Emmy-nominated and BAFTA winner Ginger Gibbons and scripted by the acclaimed writer Sam Barlow.

== Plot ==
Ella is a regular 5-year-old girl who lives with her dad, friends, and neighbours in an apartment block called Sunshine Gardens. Ella and her friends often find themselves in sticky situations (known as "Uh-oh, what a pickle!" moments). Ella's "Bingo" moments invariably involve the participation of the entire Sunshine Garden gang. Ella's neighbours are her extended family.

== Characters ==
- Henry is Ella's best friend. Henry and Ella are like yin and yang, as they complement each other, yet are very different in their outlooks. A confessed science geek, Henry finds Ella's company exhilarating.
- Ella's dad is an illustrator and like many single parents, he is busy doing a lot of things, but he always makes sure that he has time from Ella.
- Lisa and Lottie are a little older than Ella, and they live on the floor above Henry. Lisa and Lottie are identical twins and yet are very different from one another. Lottie's passion is singing, while Lisa is a gymnast.
- Mrs. Berg is Ella's elderly neighbour.
- Mr. Jackson is the caretaker of Sunshine Gardens. A good-natured helper to others, his job is to keep the building running, which he does, despite his forgetful nature, and the bemusement of the other adults.

== Episodes ==
=== Season 1 (2011) ===
Original air date: 1 December 2011 (NRK Super)

#	English title	Director	Written by
101	"Dog Trouble"	Anton Hannibal & Robert Depuis	Trond Morten K. Venaasen
102	"The Fabulous Fruitcake"	Anton Hannibal	Trond Morten K. Venaasen
103	"The New Bed"	Tom Petter Hansen & Frank Mosvold	Trond Morten K. Venaasen
104	"The Pink Umbrella"	Anton Hannibal	Susan Kim
105	"The Proud Duckling"	Tom Petter Hansen & Frank Mosvold	Trond Morten K. Venaasen
106	"The Garden Gnome"	Tom Petter Hansen & Frank Mosvold	Trond Morten K. Venaasen
107	"Father´s Day"	Anton Hannibal & Robert Depuis	Susan Kim
108	"The Great Race Day"	Tom Petter Hansen & Frank Mosvold	Trond Morten K. Venaasen
109	"Trick or Treat!"	Anton Hannibal	Susan Kim
110	"Shooting Star"	Tom Petter Hansen & Frank Mosvold	Trond Morten K. Venaasen
111	"My Valentine"	Anton Hannibal & Robert Depuis	Trond Morten K. Venaasen
112	"Everything is fun"	Tom Petter Hansen & Frank Mosvold	Trond Morten K. Venaasen
113	"The Picnic Celebration"	Robert Depuis	Susan Kim
114	"The Beautiful Princess"	Tom Petter Hansen and Frank Mosvold	Trond Morten K. Venaasen
115	"The Exciting Camping Trip"	Tom Petter Hansen and Frank Mosvold	Trond Morten K. Venaasen
116	"The Slumber Party"	Anton Hannibal and Robert Depuis	Trond Morten K. Venaasen
117	"On Two Wheels"	Anton Hannibal and Robert Depuis	Susan Kim
118	"Happy Birthday, Papa"	Anton Hannibal	Susan Kim
119	"Johansen's Surprise"	Anton Hannibal	Susan Kim
120	"The Whimsical Doctor"	Robert Depuis	Trond Morten K. Venaasen
121	"Blowing in the Wind"	Anton Hannibal	Trond Morten K. Venaasen
122	"The Sandcastle Competition"	Anton Hannibal and Robert Depuis	Trond Morten K. Venaasen
123	"The Fun Marching Band"	Tom Petter Hansen and Frank Mosvold	Trond Morten K. Venaasen
124	"The Busy Bee"	Robert Depuis	Trond Morten K. Venaasen
125	"The Important Messenger"	Tom Petter Hansen and Frank Mosvold	Trond Morten K. Venaasen
126	"The Fantastic Snowman"	Anton Hannibal	Trond Morten K. Venaasen

=== Season 2 (2013) ===
Original air date: 21 December 2013 (NRK Super)

#	English title	Director	Written by
201	"Chicken Dance"	Ginger Gibbons	Sam Barlow
202	"Helping Hands"	Ginger Gibbons	Sam Barlow
203	"Hide & See"	Ginger Gibbons	Rachel Dawson
204	"The Big Storm"	Ginger Gibbons	Lisa Ackhurst
205	"Bubble Trouble"	Ginger Gibbons	Gillian Corderoy
206	"Hocus Pocus"	Ginger Gibbons	Andy Bernhardt
207	"The Fat Cat"	Ginger Gibbons	James Mason
208	"Seeing Stars"	Ginger Gibbons	Rachel Dawson
209	"Boat Race"	Ginger Gibbons	James Mason
210	"Wet & Wild"	Ginger Gibbons	Sam Barlow
211	"Splashing About"	Ginger Gibbons	James Mason
212	"The New Zoo"	Ginger Gibbons	Gillian Corderoy
213	"The Letter"	Ginger Gibbons	Andy Bernhardt
214	"Butterflies Flutter By"	Ginger Gibbons	Rachel Dawson
215	"Dinosaur Roar!"	Ginger Gibbons	Sam Barlow
216	"Hidden Treasure"	Ginger Gibbons	James Mason
217	"The Story Teller"	Ginger Gibbons	Sam Barlow
218	"Go Kart Go"	Ginger Gibbons	Gillian Corderoy
219	"On The Trail"	Ginger Gibbons	Laura Beaumont & Paul Larson
220	"Small Is All"	Ginger Gibbons	Andy Bernhardt
221	"Tatty Teddy"	Ginger Gibbons	Lisa Ackhurst
222	"Taking the Cake"	Ginger Gibbons	James Mason
223	"Orange Aid"	Ginger Gibbons	Laura Beaumont & Paul Larson
224	"Growing Up"	Ginger Gibbons	Rachel Dawson
225	"Circus Surprise"	Ginger Gibbons	Sam Barlow
226	"Pirate Princess Puppy"	Ginger Gibbons	Sam Barlow

=== Season 3 (2014) ===
Original air date: 4 December 2014 (NRK Super)

#	English title	Director	Written by
301	"Best friends"	Ginger Gibbons	Gillian Corderoy
302	"Flying Friends"	Ginger Gibbons	Lizzie Ennever
303	"Talent Club"	Ginger Gibbons	Lisa Akhurst
304	"Gone with the wind"	Ginger Gibbons	James Mason
305	"The best of sunshine Gardens"	Ginger Gibbons	Denise Cassar
306	"Doctor, Doctor!"	Ginger Gibbons	Lisa Akhurst
307	"Keep fit"	Ginger Gibbons	Sam Barlow
308	"Sing Along"	Ginger Gibbons	Denise Cassar
309	"Sunshine Ski Jump"	Ginger Gibbons	Lisa Akhurst
310	"The Yellow Plumed warbler"	Ginger Gibbons	Sam Barlow
311	"Backing band"	Ginger Gibbons	Gillian Corderoy
312	"Big Bash"	Ginger Gibbons	Lisa Akhurst
313	"Football"	Ginger Gibbons	Lizzie Ennever
314	"Scarecrow"	Ginger Gibbons	Denise Cassar
315	"Tropical Trouble"	Ginger Gibbons	Sam Barlow
316	"Art From The Heart"	Ginger Gibbons	Lisa Akhurst
317	"Camp Out"	Ginger Gibbons	Denise Cassar
318	"Cowboy Movie"	Ginger Gibbons	Sam Barlow
319	"Space Hopper"	Ginger Gibbons	Lizzie Ennever
320	"Tallest Tower"	Ginger Gibbons	James Mason
321	"Big Day Out"	Ginger Gibbons	Sean Carson
322	"Little Visitor"	Ginger Gibbons	Lisa Akhurst
323	"Hobby Horse"	Ginger Gibbons	Denise Cassar
324	"Missing Tools"	Ginger Gibbons	James Mason
325	"Shrinking Play"	Ginger Gibbons	Lisa Akhurst
326	"Tutti Ftuity"	Ginger Gibbons	Sam Barlow
327	"Batty Bats"	Ginger Gibbons	Giles New & Keiron Self
328	"Rocket Boy"	Ginger Gibbons	Sam Barlow
329	"Bingo Robot"	Ginger Gibbons	Gillian Corderoy
330	"Tiny Town"	Ginger Gibbons	Sean Carson
331	"Going Walkie Talkie"	Ginger Gibbons	Sean Carson
332	"Magic Wand"	Ginger Gibbons	Lizzie Ennever
333	"Pixie Patrol"	Ginger Gibbons	Sean Carson
334	"Boomerang"	Ginger Gibbons	Lizzie Ennever
335	"Dance Routine"	Ginger Gibbons	Denise Casser
336	"Silly Goat"	Ginger Gibbons	Gillian Corderoy
337	"Jokers Wild"	Ginger Gibbons	Sean Carson
338	"Troll Puppets"	Ginger Gibbons	Sam Barlow
339	"Basement Monster"	Ginger Gibbons	Denise Casser
340	"Wheelbarrow Race"	Ginger Gibbons	Sean Carson
341	"Baby Sitters"	Ginger Gibbons	Sam Barlow
342	"Christmas Tree"	Ginger Gibbons	Gillian Corderoy
343	"Pie And Seek"	Ginger Gibbons	Lisa Akhurst
344	"Beast of Sunshine Gardens"	Ginger Gibbons	Sam Barlow
345	"Deep Sea Adventure"	Ginger Gibbons	Simon Nicholson
346	"Double Trouble"	Ginger Gibbons	Lizzie Ennever
347	"Boing Boing"	Ginger Gibbons	Sean Carson
348	"Santa's On His Way"	Ginger Gibbons	David Freedman
349	"Eggy Surprise"	Ginger Gibbons	Lisa Akhurst
350	"On Guard"	Ginger Gibbons	Sam Barlow
351	"Fun In The Snow"	Ginger Gibbons	Sam Barlow & Sean Carson
352	"Old Betsy"	Ginger Gibbons	Sean Carson

== Broadcast ==
Ella Bella Bingo is broadcast on Scandinavian channels such as NRK, DR and SVT, on Okto channel in Singapore, TG4 in Ireland, Kidu.Co in Turkey, DaaiTV in Indonesia, Good TV in Taiwan, Hop TV in Israel, Duronto TV in Bangladesh, and on the Al Jazeera network across the MENA countries.

== Film ==
Ella Bella Bingo was adapted into a 75-minute eponymous feature film which was released on 24 January 2020. In the film, Ella Bella and Henry are best friends with a plan of making a circus together, but when cool kid Johnny arrives in Sunshine Gardens he becomes Henry's new best friend, making Ella jealous and jeopardising the circus. It was a commercial success, grossing $981,814 against a budget of NOK 1,350,000 ($164,213), and received mixed to positive reviews from critics.
