= Relax...It's Just Sex =

1998 film by P. J. Castellaneta

- Theatrical release poster
- Directed by: P. J. Castellaneta
- Written by: P. J. Castellaneta
- Produced by: Steven Wolfe; Megan O'Neill; Harold Warren
- Starring: Mitchell Anderson; Seymour Cassel; Eddie Garcia; Lori Petty; Jennifer Tilly; Susan Tyrrell; Serena Scott Thomas; Cynda Williams; Paul Winfield; Billy Wirth; Terrence "T.C." Carson
- Cinematography: Lon Magdich
- Music by: Lori Eschler Frystak
- Distributed by: A-Pix Entertainment Inc.
- Release date: June 28, 1998
- Running time: 110 min
- Country: United States
- Language: English

Relax...It's Just Sex is a 1998 romantic comedy film directed by P. J. Castellaneta.

== Premise ==
A diverse group of couples from different sexual orientations struggle and support each other through various issues, including violent hate crimes, HIV, conception, commitment, and love in 1990s Los Angeles.

== Critical reception ==
Writing for Gay Reels Movie Reviews, Golu described Relax... It's Just Sex as both entertaining and thoughtfully executed, praising the film's handling of themes such as gay bashing, friendship, and miscarriage. He considered the film's treatment of these subjects to be well managed throughout.

In a 1999 review for Splicedwire, Rob Blackwelder described the film as a “hilarious commentary on mainstream acceptance of the gay lifestyle.”

On Rotten Tomatoes, it has a 56% score based on reviews from 16 critics. The film was also reviewed by several publications, including Entertainment Weekly, The Movie Report, The Sacramento News & Review, San Francisco Chronicle, and Film Journal International, among others.

== Cast ==
- Lori Petty as Robin Moon
- Cynda Williams as Sarina Classer
- Seymour Cassel as Emile Pillsbury
- Jennifer Tilly as Tara Ricotto
- Susan Tyrrell as Alicia Pillsbury
- Billy Wirth as Jared Bartoziak
- Paul Winfield as Auntie Mahalia
- Mitchell Anderson as Vincey Sauris
- Serena Scott Thomas as Megan Pillsbury
- Chris Cleveland as Diego Tellez
- Eddie Garcia as Javi Rogero
- Terrence 'TC' Carson as Buzz Wagner
- Tim Perez as Gus Rogero
- Ray Galletti as Nicky
- Tom Schultz as Basher/Victim
- Anthony Nacarato as Basher
- Gibbs Tolsdorf as Dwight Bergman
- Kathryn Bundy as Marcia Fu
