= Grief (film) =

- Directed by: Richard Glatzer
- Written by: Richard Glatzer
- Produced by: Ruth Charny; Yoram Mandel
- Starring: Craig Chester; Jackie Beat; Lucy Gutteridge; Illeana Douglas
- Cinematography: David Dechant
- Edited by: Robin Katz; William W. Williams
- Music by: Tom Judson
- Production company: Grief Productions
- Distributed by: Strand Releasing
- Release date: July 1993 (Frameline)
- Running time: 87 minutes
- Country: United States
- Language: English

Grief is a 1993 American comedy film, written and directed by Richard Glatzer. The film stars Craig Chester as Mark, a story editor for a daytime court show called The Love Judge, who is still dealing with his grief over the death of his husband due to HIV/AIDS a year earlier when the show's producer Jo (Jackie Beat) announces that she's departing the job; although he knows he might not get the promotion due to his sexuality, he applies for Jo's job and finds himself in competition against his driven but Prozac-addicted colleague Paula (Lucy Gutteridge).

The cast also includes Illeana Douglas, Alexis Arquette, Carlton Wilborn, Mickey Cottrell and Paul Bartel.

== Production ==
The film was inspired in part by Glatzer's own experience working on Divorce Court, during which his own partner Donald died. At a retrospective screening at Outfest in 2015, just a few weeks before Glatzer's death, he stated that he had not wanted to make a sorrowful film about the horrors of AIDS, but wanted to juxtapose Mark's grief with the humour and absurdity of life going on.

It was the only film Glatzer made on his own before meeting Wash Westmoreland, who would become both his husband and his creative partner on all of his future films.

== Release ==
The film premiered at San Francisco's Frameline Film Festival, where it won the Audience Award for Best Narrative Feature.

== Critical response ==
Kevin Thomas of The Los Angeles Times praised the film's endearing mixture of comedy and poignancy, writing that Glatzer "brings a sure sense of structure and makes the most of an opportunity to display a gift for sharp, witty dialogue. “Grief" takes place virtually entirely within "The Love Judge" offices, yet it is always cinematic, never stagy. Whenever "Grief" threatens to get too emotional, Glatzer deftly cuts to glimpses of outrageous "Love Judge" episodes, which feature cameos by Mickey Cottrell (as the judge), Mary Woronov, Paul Bartel and performance artists Johanna Went and John Fleck. The stories the writers concoct border on the delirious as do their inevitable mutations—Jeremy has come up with a story idea about a leper only to find him turned into a diabetic amputee."

Marjorie Baumgarten of the Austin Chronicle wrote that the film is "something like what Soapdish might have been if John Waters had scripted the movie." She concluded that "Occasionally, the movie's momentum gets waylaid by some dead-end campiness that goes nowhere but, for the most part, the dialogue and situations are sharp and funny. The milieu of the production office is exactly right with its always broken-down copier, tight quarters, chaotic-seeming sheaves of paper, inexplicable doodads everywhere, and mostly, its office camaraderie that supersedes the office politics. Permit it a few indulgences, and you, too, will find yourself stricken with Grief."

For The Advocate, Lawrence Frascella wrote that "while there is some bad, bad melodrama to muddle through, Glatzer and his ensemble make believable the movie’s last-minute surge of office camaraderie. They even manage to generate genuine poignancy along the way. Grief is not a particularly challenging or groundbreaking film. But it is very funny, heartwarming entertainment with an uncompromising gay bent: Imagine The Mary Tyler Moore Show in an alternative universe."
