= Girl King =

- Directed by: Ileana Pietrobruno
- Music by: Amon Tobin
- Release date: 2002

Girl King is a 2002 Canadian feature-length, drag king pirate movie; directed, produced, written and edited by Ileana Pietrobruno, with cinematography by John Houtman. It stars Chrystal Donbrath-Zinga, Michael-Ann Connor, Raven Courtney, Victoria Deschanel, Joyce Pate, and Jonathan Sutton. The music is by Amon Tobin.

== See also ==
- List of LGBT films directed by women
