= Richard Glatzer =

American writer and director

- Born: January 28, 1952; New York City, U.S.
- Died: March 10, 2015 (aged 63); Los Angeles, California, U.S.
- Education: University of Michigan; University of Virginia
- Occupations: Writer, director
- Spouse: Wash Westmoreland (m. 2013)

Richard Glatzer (January 28, 1952 – March 10, 2015) was an American writer and director.

== Early life ==
Glatzer was born in Flushing, Queens. He grew up in Westbury, Long Island, and Livingston, New Jersey, then gained a bachelor's degree at the University of Michigan (BA 1973), and a PhD in English from the University of Virginia.

While at the University of Michigan, Glatzer took advantage of the many film society screenings on campus to watch and study hundreds of films. He formed a friendship with Neal Gabler, who was writing long film reviews for The Michigan Daily at the time. Glatzer also organized a Frank Capra film festival during his time there, and remained friends with Capra for many years afterwards. Glatzer and John Raeburn co-edited the book Frank Capra: The Man And His Films, which was published by the University of Michigan Press in 1975.

== Early career ==
He entered the film world in the mid-1980s working under the tutelage of Jay and Lewis Allen. He worked on TV shows such as Divorce Court, The Osbournes, and America's Next Top Model.

Glatzer used his experience working in day time television to create his first independent film, Grief (1993), a comedy-drama focusing on a writer for a trashy daytime TV show who comes to grips with office politics, a co-worker crush and homophobia. It premiered at San Francisco's Frameline Festival, where it won the Audience Award for Best Picture. It starred Craig Chester, Illeana Douglas, Alexis Arquette, Jackie Beat, Carlton Wilborn, and Lucy Gutteridge.

Glatzer taught screenwriting at the School of Visual Arts in New York City.

Glatzer and Wash Westmoreland were a married writing and directing team based in Los Angeles who made an eclectic set of independent movies. Their last film, Still Alice, with Julianne Moore, Alec Baldwin, and Kristen Stewart, premiered at Toronto 2014 and was considered the surprise hit of the festival. The movie was picked up by Sony Pictures Classics, who released the film in December 2014. Glatzer died of ALS, and some critics have suggested a connection between his own experience with illness and the raw, honest depiction of illness in the film.

== Later career ==
=== 2001: The Fluffer ===
Glatzer and Westmoreland's first collaboration was The Fluffer, a look at obsession, addiction and power relationships in the gay porn industry. It premiered at Berlin and Toronto Film Festivals in 2001 and secured US distribution from First Run Features. It received mixed positive reviews and gained almost instant cult status, John Waters including it in his most famous series Ten Movies That Will Corrupt You. The film starred Michael Cunio, Roxanne Day, Scott Gurney, and Deborah Harry.

=== 2006: Quinceañera ===
Made for a budget of under $500,000, and featuring many first-time actors, Quinceañera ended up winning both the Audience Award and the Grand Jury Prize at the 2006 Sundance Film Festival. It went on to win the prestigious Humanitas Prize, the John Cassavetes Prize at the Film Independent Spirit Awards in 2007, and many other film festival prizes all over the world. It was picked up for the U.S. by Sony Pictures Classics and distributed in over 25 countries worldwide.

The plot focussed on a multigenerational Mexican-American family preparing for their daughter's quinceañera against the back drop of a gentrifying neighborhood. The film was entirely shot in Echo Park, which is where the directors live. On release, it received strong positive reviews scoring 87% on Rotten Tomatoes. The lead actress, Emily Rios, went on to have a successful career starring in Friday Night Lights, Breaking Bad, and The Bridge.

=== 2008: Pedro ===
Working with Bunim-Murray productions, Glatzer and Westmoreland executive-produced a movie called Pedro about Pedro Zamora — the AIDS activist who was cast on MTV's The Real World in 1993. The movie was directed by Nick Oceano and produced by Maggie Malina and Jon Murray. For a made for MTV movie, Pedro enjoyed a surprise International festival run. It premiered at Toronto International Film Festival 2007 and Berlin 2008. President Bill Clinton recorded a special introduction for it when it premiered on television.

=== 2013: The Last of Robin Hood ===
Glatzer originally heard of a book about Errol Flynn's last love affair, The Big Love, through his mentor, Jay Presson Allen, the screenwriter of The Prime of Miss Jean Brodie and Cabaret. The story is told by Flynn's girlfriend's mother, Florence Aadland with co-writer Tedd Thomey and has been praised by the likes of William Styron and W.H. Auden as the ultimate unreliable narrator story. Glatzer and Westmoreland started researching the screenplay in 2003, earning the trust of Florence's daughter, Beverly, and the friendship of author Tedd Thomey and Flynn's chauffeur in his final years, Ronnie Shedlo. They wrote the first draft of the screenplay in 2007 but it was not until 2011, and the attachment of Kevin Kline, that things started to move forward. Killer Films' Christine Vachon and Pam Koffler came on to produce, and Susan Sarandon and Dakota Fanning signed on for the mother-daughter team of Florence and Beverly. Production took place in Atlanta Georgia in 2013. The city's various locations were used to represent Los Angeles, New York, French Equatorial Africa, Cuba and Vancouver.

The movie premiered at Toronto International Film Festival in 2013 to a mixed critical response. Several critics praised Kline's performance as Oscar worthy, whereas other seemed confounded by the movie's lack of a moral stance. Glatzer and Westmoreland's intent had always been to focus on the permission for the relationship, afforded by the mother, rather than its morality.

=== 2014: Still Alice ===
Based on a 2007 book written by Lisa Genova, Still Alice is a film about a 50-year-old linguistics professor who develops early onset Alzheimer's disease. Glatzer and Westmoreland were hired to adapt the book in 2011 by UK-based producing duo Lex Lutzus and James Brown. Killer Films' Christine Vachon and Pam Koffler then came on as US production partners and Maria Shriver and Elizabeth Gelfand Stearns came on as executives and co-executive producers. Julianne Moore was Glatzer and Westmoreland's first choice to play Alice. She was soon joined by Kristen Stewart and Kate Bosworth, who had been a long time fan of the book. Alec Baldwin then came on to round out the cast, he and Moore having worked together on the TV show 30 Rock.

Glatzer and Westmoreland changed the location for the film from Boston to New York and the university from Harvard to Columbia. Shooting took place over 23 days in March 2014.

The movie was picked up by Sony Pictures Classics, and released in December 2014. Glatzer was living with ALS and some critics have suggested a connection between his own battle with illness and the raw, honest depiction of illness in the film. Moore won the Academy Award for Best Actress for her performance, and dedicated her win to Glatzer.

== Personal life and death ==
Glatzer married writer and director Wash Westmoreland in September 2013. On March 10, 2015, he died of complications from amyotrophic lateral sclerosis (ALS).

== Awards ==
- 1993 San Francisco Frameline Festival: Best Movie – "Grief" (1993)
