= Ileana Pietrobruno =

Canadian film director

Ileana Pietrobruno is an independent Canadian filmmaker who has written, directed, edited and produced several short films and the following features: the erotic drama Girlfriend Experience, the pirate adventure Girl King, and the surreal Cat Swallows Parakeet and Speaks!. Pietrobruno's films have won awards and screened at festivals such as the Berlin International Film Festival and the Toronto International Film Festival.

== Filmography ==
- Window Horses (2016) – Editor
- Girlfriend Experience (2008)
- GFE: Girlfriend Experience (DVD title) Distributor, Canada - Mongrel Media
- Girl King (2002) Distributor - Ariztical Entertainment
- Cat Swallows Parakeet And Speaks! (1996) Distributor - CFMDC
- Narcissus (1996)
- Zoo (1992)
- The Chilliwack Princess (1990)
- The Sisters of Gion (1987)
- Spacing In (1986)

== See also ==
- List of female film and television directors
- List of lesbian filmmakers
- List of LGBT-related films directed by women
