= Frank Mosvold =

Norwegian film and television producer (born 1965)

Frank Mosvold (born 7 May 1965) is a Norwegian film and television producer. He has a B.S. in economics from Babson College (Wellesley, Ma) and Master in fine art in film production from Loyola Marymount University (Los Angeles, CA). In 1996 Frank Mosvold started his own production company, Kool Produktion AS. He has produced several award-winning shorts, including the Terje Vigen award at the Norwegian Short Film Festival for the film An Accidental Story. Frank, along with Tom Petter Hansen and Trond Morten Venaasen, developed an animated television series Ella Bella Bingo and its 2020 film adaptation.
