= Claudia Morgado Escanilla =

Chilean-Canadian filmmaker

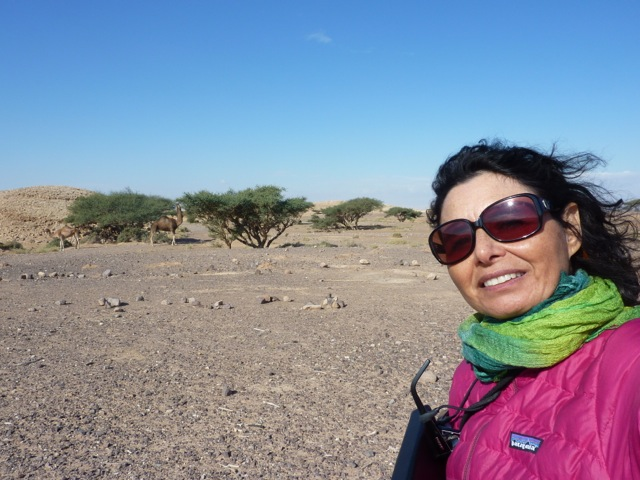
- Claudia Morgado in 2014
- Born: 1962 (age 63–64); Santiago, Chile
- Education: Concordia University, Simon Fraser University, University of British Columbia, Canadian Film Centre
- Occupations: Filmmaker, writer, script supervisor, producer, curator
- Notable work: Unbound (1995); No Bikini (2007)

Claudia Morgado Escanilla (Claudia Morgado, Claudia Morgado E.) (born 1962) is a Chilean-Canadian filmmaker, writer, script supervisor, producer and curator. She has worked on the festival circuit and commercially. Morgado was the script supervisor of film or television shows including The Twilight Saga: New Moon (2009), The Twilight Saga: Eclipse (2010), Hyena Road and Legends of Tomorrow.

Morgado has directed ten short films. She is best known for her short film Unbound (1995), winner of five festival awards including Teddy Award for Best Short Film (1996). She is also known for her short film No Bikini (2007). It received best short film awards in San Francisco Frameline Film Festival (2008) and Switzerland's Pink Apple Award (2008).

Morgado's short films involve topics related to race, identity, cross-dressing, LGBT, feminism, and genderqueer, and they combine multiple social, cultural, formal and aesthetic values.

== Early life and education ==
Claudia Morgado Escanilla was born in 1962 in Santiago in Chile. She immigrated to Canada in 1986. In 1991, she received her BFA from Concordia University in Montreal. She also trained in Simon Fraser University, Vancouver. She subsequently moved to Vancouver where she received her first Canada Council Grant to write and direct Unbound. In 1999–2000, she completed the Cineplex Entertainment Film Program (Directors' Lab) in Short Dramatic Film Program at the Canadian Film Centre. Morgado obtained her MA degree from the University of British Columbia in 2012.

== Career ==
Her documentary short Unbound won the Teddy award from the Berlin International Film Festival, Best Foreign Film at the Festival de Femmes in Paris, The Isabella Lindell Award at the Ann Arbour Film Festival, The Jury Award at the Northwest Film Festival and a Certificate of Merit from the Chicago International Film Festival. Subsequently, Unbound has been invited to over 100 film festivals and purchased by the video archives of thirty universities.

Morgado continued to create short films. In 1996, Claudia directed Angustia (Anguish). Produced as part of a collaboration effort by Cineworks Independent Filmmaker's society, Angustia screened at over 50 festivals earning the Jury Award at the Yorkton Film Festival and a Special Mention at the Festival of Nations in the Czech Republic. In 1997, Claudia directed the erotic short Sabor a Mi (Savour Me), an official selection for festivals in Montreal, Berlin and Sundance. It received the Jury Award at the Northwest Film Festival, the Audience Award at Festival de Femmes in Paris, The Best Cinematography at Images in Toronto and a Special Mention in Turin, Inside Out, and Out on Screen.

In 2002, Morgado returned to the West Coast to co-write and direct Bitten. This short film went on to win Best Director and Best Supporting Actress at the New York International Film and Video Festival and the Women in Film Award at the Vancouver International Film Festival.

No Bikini, a short film financed by the Canada Council, the BC Arts Council and Cineworks was completed in 2009. The films screened at many international festivals including The Berlin International Film Festival, TIFF, The Montreal World Film Festival and VIFF. It received over 18 awards and Special mentions including the Grand Jury Prize at the PlanetOut Festival. The award was announced at the Sundance film festival of the same year. Claudia's contributions to film have been recognized both on and off the festival circuit.

In 2003, UBC Press published the book Women Filmmaker’s Refocusing, which contained a chapter entitled: Beyond the Homeland: Latino-Canadian Film and the Work of Claudia Morgado. Claudia was nominated for the Shavick Award for most promising Western Canadian Filmmaker. In 2005, the National Archives of Canada requested copies of Claudia's award-winning films to be added to their permanent collection.

== Attitude towards her film ==
In an interview, Morgado told the interviewer about her interest on the lesbian subtext shown in her work: "I like subtext, whatever the subtext may be, and the lesbian subtext is interesting. It uses my intelligence."

She has also stated her attitude toward the gender identity reflected in many of her films:

My films have always been about the female body politics and the pleasure and eroticism of sexuality regardless of sexual identity.

— Claudia Morgado Escanilla

== Filmography ==
	film name	credit as	film details
1995	Unbound (Sin ataduras)	Director, writer, producer	16mm, 20 mins
1996	Angustia (anguish)	director, writer	16mm, 5 mins
1998	Sabor a mí (savour me)	director, writer, co-producer	35mm 22 mins
2000	Martirio (sufferance)	director	16mm,16.5 mins
2002	Bitten	Director, co-writer	35mm, 14 mins
2007	No Bikini	director, co-writer, producer	35mm, 9 mins
