= P. J. Castellaneta =

American film director

- Born: Paul Joseph Castellaneta; 1960 (age 65–66); Lynbrook, New York
- Occupations: film director, screenwriter
- Known for: Together Alone, Relax...It's Just Sex

Paul Joseph (P. J.) Castellaneta (born 1960) is an American film director, who wrote and directed the films Together Alone and Relax...It's Just Sex.

Castellaneta was born in Lynbrook, New York. He was working as a story supervisor for Warner Bros. when he made Relax...It's Just Sex.

Castellaneta made the short film What's a Nice Kid Like You... in 1986. His feature film debut, Together Alone, won the Teddy Award and the International Confederation of Art Cinemas prize at the 42nd Berlin International Film Festival, as well as the Audience Award at the San Francisco International Lesbian & Gay Film Festival and the Best Feature Film Award at the Torino International Lesbian & Gay Film Festival. A stage adaptation of the film was also produced in 1992 by the Upstart Theatre Company in Chicago.
