= Together Alone (film) =

1991 film by P. J. Castellaneta

- Directed by: P. J. Castellaneta
- Written by: P. J. Castellaneta
- Produced by: P. J. Castellaneta
- Starring: Terry Curry; Todd Stites
- Cinematography: David Dechant
- Edited by: P. J. Castellaneta; Maria Lee
- Music by: Wayne Alabardo
- Distributed by: Frameline
- Release dates: September 13, 1991 (Toronto Festival of Festivals); September 24, 1992 (U.S.)
- Running time: 87 minutes
- Country: United States
- Language: English
- Budget: $7,000
- Box office: $110,505 (US)

Together Alone is a 1991 drama film written and directed by P. J. Castellaneta and starring Terry Curry and Todd Stites.

== Plot ==
Bryan meets a man called Bill in a bar. They go back to Bryan's home and have unprotected sex. Later, they wake up and talk. Bryan discovers that Bill's real name is Brian, and that he is bisexual. They spend hours talking, covering topics including AIDS, sexuality, feminism, role-play and Emily Dickinson.

== Cast ==
- Terry Curry as Brian
- Todd Stites as Bryan

== Production ==
P. J. Castellaneta directed, wrote, produced, edited and even catered Together Alone. It was made on a budget of $7,000 and shot on 16mm black-and-white film. It was filmed over weekends and evenings in Castellaneta's own apartment.

== Reception ==
In 1991, the film won the audience award at the San Francisco International Lesbian & Gay Film Festival. The following year it won the Teddy Award for Best Feature Film and the Best Art House Film award at the Berlin International Film Festival and the award for Best Feature Film at the Torino International Gay & Lesbian Film Festival. Writing for The Austin Chronicle, Marjorie Barmgauten called the film "forthright and artistically accomplished". In his book Bisexual Characters in Film, Wayne M. Bryant said that with the character of Brian, Castellaneta "manages to reinforce every existing negative stereotype about bisexual men".
