= List of LGBTQ-related films directed by women =

This is a list of lesbian, gay, bisexual, transgender and queer-related films that were directed by women. LGBTQ-themed films directed by women – especially, but not exclusively, lesbian-themed movies – are an important and distinct subset of the genre. Academics have studied the issue of how women as directors contribute to the way lesbian stories, in particular, have been told; while LGBTQ media, and to some extent the mainstream, have examined the difference a "female gaze" brings to a film.

Telefilms and documentaries are included in the list. Films co-directed with men are not included. English titles beginning with determiners "A", "An", and "The" are alphabetized by the first significant word.

== 0–9 ==
- 2 Seconds (1998, Canada) by Manon Briand
- A 20th Century Chocolate Cake (1983, Canada) by Lois Siegel
- 3 Generations (2015, United States) by Gaby Dellal
- 52 Tuesdays (2013, Australia) by Sophie Hyde
- 533 Statements (2006, Canada) by Tori Foster
- 20,000 Species of Bees (2023, Spain) by Estibaliz Urresola Solaguren

== A ==
- Accidental Activists (2016, United States) by Mandi Wright
- Addicted to Fresno (2015, United States) by Jamie Babbit
- Ahead of the Curve (2020, United States) by Jen Rainin and Rivkah Beth
- Alice (2002, France/United Kingdom) by Sylvie Ballyot
- Alice & Iza (2018, United States) by Christin Baker
- All About E (2015, Australia) by Louise Wadley
- All About Love (De xian chao fan) (2010, Hong Kong) by Ann Hui
- All God's Children (1996, United States) by Sylvia Rhue, Frances Reid, and Dee Mosbacher
- All Over Me (1997, United States) by Alex Sichel
- Almost Adults (2016, Canada) by Sarah Rotella
- Along Came Love (Le Temps d'aimer) (2023, France/Belgium) by Katell Quillévéré
- Amazones d'Hier, Lesbiennes d'Aujourd'hui (Amazons of Yesterday, Lesbians of Today) (1982, Canada) by Réseau Vidé-Elle feminist collective
- The Amina Profile (2015, Canada) by Sophie Deraspe
- Amour de Femme (A Woman's Love) (2001, France) by Sylvie Verheyde
- Anatomy of a Love Seen (2014, United States) by Marina Rice Bader
- And Breathe Normally (Andið eðlilega) (2018, Iceland) by Ísold Uggadóttir
- And Then Came Lola (2009, United States) by Ellen Seidler and Megan Siler
- Anita's Last Cha-Cha (Ang huling cha-cha ni Anita) (2013, Philippines) by Sigrid Andrea Bernardo
- Anne Trister (1986, Canada) by Léa Pool
- Antidiva: The Carole Pope Confessions (2026, Canada) by Michelle Mama
- Antonia's Line (1995, Netherlands) by Marleen Gorris
- Appropriate Behavior (2014, United Kingdom) by Desiree Akhavan
- April's Shower (2003, United States) by Trish Doolan
- The Archivettes (2019, United States) by Megan Rossman
- Atomic Saké (1999, Canada) by Louise Archambault
- Ava's Impossible Things (2016, United States) by Marina Rice Bader
- AWOL (2016, United States) by Deb Shoval
- Axolotl Overkill (2017, Germany) by Helene Hegemann

== B ==
- The Baby Formula (2008, Canada) by Alison Reid
- Baby Jane (2019, Finland) by Katja Gauriloff
- Bandaged (2009, Germany/United States/France) by Maria Beatty
- Bar Girls (1994, United States) by Marita Giovanni
- Bare (2015, United States) by Natalia Leite
- Be Like Others (2008, Canada/United Kingdom/United States/France) by Tanaz Eshaghian
- Beach Rats (2017, United States) by Eliza Hittman
- Beautiful Thing (1996, United Kingdom) by Hettie MacDonald
- Bedrooms and Hallways (1998, United Kingdom) by Rose Troche
- Before Stonewall (1984, United States) by Greta Schiller
- Before You Know It (2019, United States) by Hannah Pearl Utt
- Below Her Mouth (2016, Canada) by April Mullen
- Below the Belt (1999, Canada) by Dominique Cardona and Laurie Colbert
- The Berlin Affair (Interno Berlinese) (1985, Italy/West Germany) by Liliana Cavani
- Bessie (2015, United States) by Dee Rees
- Better Than Chocolate (1999, Canada) by Anne Wheeler
- Beyond Good and Evil (Al di là del bene e del male) (1977, Italy) by Liliana Cavani
- Billie and Emma (2018, Philippines) by Samantha Lee
- Blind Love (2025, Taiwan) by Julian Chou
- Blockers (2018, United States) by Kay Cannon
- Blokes (2010, Chile) by Marialy Rivas
- Blood Lines (2025, Canada) by Gail Maurice
- BloodSisters (1995, United States) by Michelle Handelman
- Bloodthirsty (2020, Canada) by Amelia Moses
- Bloomington (2010, United States) by Fernanda Cardoso
- Blue Jean (2022, United Kingdom) by Georgia Oakley
- Blush (Barash) (2015, Israel) by Michal Vinik
- The Book of Gabrielle (2016, United Kingdom) by Lisa Gornick
- Booksmart (2019, United States) by Olivia Wilde
- Born in Flames (1983, United States) by Lizzie Borden
- Bottoms (2023, United States) by Emma Seligman
- Bound (1996, United States) by The Wachowskis (Note: Bound is billed as "written and directed by the Wachowski Brothers". The Wachowski siblings are today known as Lana and Lilly Wachowski.)
- A Boy Named Sue (2001, United States) by Julie Wyman
- Boys Don't Cry (1999, United States) by Kimberly Peirce
- The Brandon Teena Story (1998, United States) by Susan Muska and Gréta Olafsdóttir
- Break My Fall (2011, United Kingdom) by Kanchi Wichmann
- Breaking the Girls (2012, United States) by Jamie Babbit
- Bruised (2020, United States/United Kingdom) by Halle Berry
- Bulbul Can Sing (2018, India) by Rima Das
- But I'm a Cheerleader (1999, United States) by Jamie Babbit
- Butch Mystique (2003, United States) by Debra A. Wilson
- Butterfly (Húdié) (2004, Hong Kong) by Yan Yan Mak
- Bye Bye Blondie (2012, France) by Virginie Despentes

== C ==
- Camp Belvidere (2014, United States) by Astrid Ovalles and Oriana Oppice
- Can You Ever Forgive Me? (2018, United States) by Marielle Heller
- Candyman (2021, United States/Canada) by Nia DaCosta
- Caramel (2007, Lebanon) by Nadine Labaki
- Carmen and Lola (Carmen y Lola) (2018, Spain) by Arantxa Echevarría
- Carmilla (2019, United Kingdom) by Emily Harris
- Catherine Opie b. 1961 (2019, United States) by Sini Anderson
- Chaos and Desire (2002, Canada) by Manon Briand
- Choosing Children (1985, United States) by Kim Klausner and Debra Chasnoff
- Christmas at the Ranch (2021, United States) by Christin Baker
- Chutney Popcorn (1999, United States) by Nisha Ganatra
- Circumstance (Šar'ayet) (2011, France/Iran/United States) by Maryam Keshavarz
- Circus of Books (2019, United States) by Rachel Mason
- Claire of the Moon (1992, United States) by Nicole Conn
- Clambake (2015, United States) by Andrea Meyerson
- Clementine (2019, United States) by Lara Gallagher
- Close-Knit (Karera ga honki de amu toki wa) (2017, Japan) by Naoko Ogigami
- Codependent Lesbian Space Alien Seeks Same (2011, United States) by Madeleine Olnek
- Common Ground (2000, United States) by Donna Deitch
- Como Esquecer (So Hard to Forget) (2010, Brazil) by Malu de Martino
- The Company of Strangers (1990, Canada) by Cynthia Scott
- Compulsus (2022, Canada) by Tara Thorne
- Concussion (2013, United States) by Stacie Passon
- Cosa Bella (2006, United States) by Fiona Mackenzie
- Costa Brava (1995, Spain) by Marta Balletbò-Coll
- Cowboys (2020, United States) by Anna Kerrigan
- Cracks (2009, United Kingdom) by Jordan Scott
- The Cricket and the Ant (La Cigale et la Fourmi) (2016, Germany) by Julia Ritschel
- Cynara: Poetry in Motion (1996, United States) by Nicole Conn

== D ==
- Daddy Issues (2018, United States) by Amara Cash
- Dancing Queens (2021, Sweden) by Helena Bergström
- Daphne (2007, United Kingdom) by Clare Beavan
- Daughter's Daughter (2024, Taiwan) by Huang Xi
- Dawn, Her Dad and the Tractor (2021, Canada) by Shelley Thompson
- Days of Happiness (Les jours heureux) (2023, Canada) by Chloé Robichaud
- D.E.B.S. (2004, United States) by Angela Robinson
- Death of a Poetess (2017, Israel) by Efrat Mishori and Dana Goldberg
- Desert Hearts (1985, United States) by Donna Deitch
- Desi's Looking for a New Girl (2000, United States) by Mary Guzmán
- Despite Everything (A pesar de todo) (2019, Spain) by Gabriela Tagliavini
- Die Konkurrentin (The Competitor) (1997, Germany) by Dagmar Hirtz
- Dim Sum Funeral (2008, United States) by Anna Chi
- The Divide (La Fracture) (2021, France) by Catherine Corsini
- Do I Love You? (2002, United Kingdom) by Lisa Gornick
- Do Revenge (2022, United States) by Jennifer Kaytin Robinson
- Dolls (Pusinky) (2007, Czech Republic) by Karin Babinská
- Domestic Bliss (1985, United Kingdom) by Joy Chamberlain
- Don't Call Me Son (Mãe Só Há Uma) (2016, Brazil) by Anna Muylaert
- Don't Look at Me That Way (Schau mich nicht so an) (2015, Germany) by Uisenma Borchu
- Drifting Flowers (Piao Lang Qing Chun) (2008, Taiwan) by Zero Chou
- Dustin (2020, France) by Naïla Guiguet
- Dykes, Camera, Action! (2018, United States) by Caroline Berler
- Dyketactics (1974, United States) by Barbara Hammer
- Dysphoric: Fleeing Womanhood Like a House on Fire (2021, India) by Vaishnavi Sundar

== E ==
- Edie & Thea: A Very Long Engagement (2009, United States) by Susan Muska and Greta Olafsdottir
- Ek Ladki Ko Dekha Toh Aisa Laga (How I Felt When I Saw That Girl) (2019, India) by Shelly Chopra Dhar
- Elena Undone (2010, United States) by Nicole Conn
- Elisa & Marcela (2019, Spain) by Isabel Coixet
- Ellie & Abbie (& Ellie's Dead Aunt) (2020, Australia) by Monica Zanetti
- êmîcêtôcêt: Many Bloodlines (2020, Canada) by Theola Ross
- Eva & Candela (¿Cómo te llamas?) (2018, Colombia) by Ruth Caudeli
- Ever After (Endzeit) (2019, Germany) by Carolina Hellsgård
- Everything Relative (1996, United States) by Sharon Pollack
- Everything Will Be Fine (Alles wird gut) (1998, Germany) by Angelina Maccarone

== F ==
- A Family Affair (2001, United States) by Helen Lesnick
- Family Pack (2000, Belgium/Canada/France/Switzerland) by Chris Vander Stappen
- Fanny: The Right to Rock (2021, Canada) by Bobbi Jo Hart
- Fear of Water (2014, United Kingdom) by Kate Lane
- Fear Street Part One: 1994 (2021, United States) by Leigh Janiak
- The Feels (2017, United States) by Jenée LaMarque
- Female Perversions (1996, United States) by Susan Streitfeld
- Finding Mr. Wright (2011, United States) by Nancy Criss
- Finding North (1998, United States) by Tanya Wexler
- Finn's Girl (2007, Canada) by Dominique Cardona and Laurie Colbert
- Fire (1996, India/Canada) by Deepa Mehta
- The Firefly (La luciérnaga) (2015, Colombia) by Ana Maria Hermida
- The Fish Child (El niño pez) (2009, Argentina) by Lucía Puenzo
- The Five Devils (Les cinq diables) (2022, France) by Léa Mysius
- Flat Girls (Flat Girls Chan Hang Rawang Rao) (2025, Thailand) by Jirassaya Wongsutin
- Forbidden Fruit (2000, Germany/Zimbabwe) by Sue Maluwa-Bruce
- Forbidden Love: The Unashamed Stories of Lesbian Lives (1992, Canada) by Lynne Fernie and Aerlyn Weissman
- Forgotten Roads (2020, Chile) by Nicol Ruiz Benavides
- Four More Years (Fyra år till) (2010, Sweden) by Tova Magnusson
- The Foxy Merkins (2013, United States) by Madeleine Olnek
- Francheska: Prairie Queen (2022, Canada) by Laura O'Grady
- Freelancers Anonymous (2018, United States) by Sonia Sebastián
- Fremde Haut (Unveiled) (2005, Germany) by Angelina Maccarone
- French Twist (Gazon maudit) (1995, France) by Josiane Balasko
- Fresh Kill (1994, United States) by Shu Lea Cheang
- Frida (2002, United States) by Julie Taymor
- Friendsgiving (2020, United States) by Nicol Paone

== G ==
- Game Girls (2018, France/Germany) by Alina Skrzeszewska
- Gasoline (Benzina) (2001, Italy) by Monica Stambrini
- Gateways Grind (2022, United Kingdom) by Jacquie Lawrence
- Gayby Baby (2015, Australia) by Maya Newell
- Gekijōban Zero (Fatal Frame) (2014, Japan) by Mari Asato
- The Gendercator (2007, United States) by Catherine Crouch
- Gigola (2010, France) by Laure Charpentier
- Gillery's Little Secret (2006, United States) by T.M. Scorzafava
- The Girl (2000, United States/France) by Sande Zeig
- Girl King (2002, Canada) by Ileana Pietrobruno
- A Girl Like Me: The Gwen Araujo Story (2006, United States) by Agnieszka Holland
- Girl Picture (Tytöt tytöt tytöt) (2022, Finland) by Alli Haapasalo
- Girl Play (2004, United States) by Lee Friedlander
- Girl Talk (2018, United States) by Erica Rose
- A Girl Thing (2001, United States) by Lee Rose
- Girlfriends (2025, Macau/Taiwan/Hong Kong/Thailand) by Tracy Choi
- Girlhood (Bande de filles) (2014, France) by Céline Sciamma
- Girltrash: All Night Long (2014, United States) by Alexandra Kondracke
- Girls Can't Swim (Les filles ne savent pas nager) (2000, France) by Anne-Sophie Birot
- Go Fish (1994, United States) by Rose Troche
- Goldfish Memory (2003, Ireland) by Elizabeth Gill
- Goodbye Emma Jo (1997, United States) by Cheryl Newbrough
- Gray Matters (2006, United States) by Sue Kramer
- A Great Ride (2018, United States) by Deborah Craig and Veronica Deliz
- The Ground Beneath My Feet (Der Boden unter den Füßen) (2019, Austria) by Marie Kreutzer
- Grown Up Movie Star (2010, Canada) by Adriana Maggs
- Gypo (2005, United Kingdom) by Jan Dunn

== H ==
- Hailey Rose (2023, Canada) by Sandi Somers
- The Half of It (2020, United States) by Alice Wu
- Hannah Free (2009, United States) by Wendy Jo Carlton
- Happiest Season (2020, United States) by Clea DuVall
- He Hated Pigeons (2015, Canada/Chile) by Ingrid Veninger
- Head On (1998, Australia) by Ana Kokkinos
- Heartland (2016, United States) by Maura Anderson
- Hello Stranger (2024, Canada) by Amélie Hardy
- Hide and Seek (1996, United States) by Su Friedrich
- High Art (1998, United States) by Lisa Cholodenko
- The Hill Where Lionesses Roar (La colline où rugissent les lionnes; Luaneshat e kodrës) (2021, France/Kosovo) by Luàna Bajrami
- History Lessons (2000, United States) by Barbara Hammer
- Homemade Melodrama (1982, United Kingdom) by Jacqui Duckworth
- Hot Milk (2025, United Kingdom/Greece) by Rebecca Lenkiewicz
- Hummer (2003, United States) by Guinevere Turner
- Humpday (2009, United States) by Lynn Shelton

== I ==
- I Can't Think Straight (2008, United Kingdom) by Shamim Sarif
- I Carry You with Me (2020, United States/Mexico) by Heidi Ewing
- I Love Her (2013, Ukraine) by Darya Perelay
- I Never Promised You a Jasmine Garden (2024, Canada) by Teyama Alkamli
- I Shot Andy Warhol (1996, United Kingdom/United States) by Mary Harron
- If These Walls Could Talk 2 (2000, United States) by Jane Anderson, Martha Coolidge and Anne Heche
- I've Heard the Mermaids Singing (1987, Canada) by Patricia Rozema
- Il Vento e le Rose (Ai-suru to iu koto; The Awakening of Love) (2009, Japan/Italy) by Elisa Bolognini
- In Between (Arabic: Bar Bahar; Hebrew: Lo Po Lo Sham) (2016, Israel/France) by Maysaloun Hamoud
- The Incredibly True Adventure of Two Girls in Love (1995, United States) by Maria Maggenti
- Indian Summer (1996, United Kingdom) by Nancy Meckler
- Inescapable (2003, United States) by Helen Lesnick
- Intentions (2003, United States) by Luane Beck
- An Intimate Friendship (2000, United States) by Angela Evers Hughey
- It's in the Water (1997, United States) by Kelli Herd
- Itty Bitty Titty Committee (2007, United States) by Jamie Babbit

== J ==
- Jack (2004, United States) by Lee Rose
- Jaded (1998, United States) by Caryn Krooth
- Jamie and Jessie Are Not Together (2011, United States) by Wendy Jo Carlton
- Je Tu Il Elle (1974, Belgium/France) by Chantal Akerman
- Jennifer's Body (2009, United States) by Karyn Kusama
- Jenny's Wedding (2015, United States) by Mary Agnes Donoghue
- Joe + Belle (2011, Israel) by Veronica Kedar
- The Journey (Sancharram) (2004, India) by Ligy J. Pullappally
- The Joy of Life (2005, United States) by Jenni Olson
- Julian (2025, Belgium/Netherlands) by Cato Kusters
- Just Friends (Gewoon Vrienden) (2018, Netherlands) by Ellen Smit
- Justine's Film (Le film de Justine) (1989, Canada) by Jeanne Crépeau

== K ==
- Kajillionaire (2020, United States) by Miranda July.
- Kakera: A Piece of Our Life (2009, Japan) by Momoko Ando
- Kamikaze Hearts (1986, United States) by Juliet Bashore
- Keep Not Silent (2004, Israel) by Ilil Alexander
- Keillers Park (2006, Sweden) by Susanna Edwards
- The Kids Are All Right (2010, United States) by Lisa Cholodenko
- Kiki (2016, United States/Sweden) by Sara Jordenö
- Kiss Me Kosher (2020, Germany) by Shirel Peleg
- Kokomo City (2023, United States) by D. Smith
- Kyss mig (Kiss Me; With Every Heartbeat) (2011, Sweden) by Alexandra-Therese Keining

== L ==
- L Word Mississippi: Hate the Sin (2014, United States) by Lauren Lazin
- Lady Bird (2017, United States) by Greta Gerwig
- Lakeview (2024, Canada) by Tara Thorne
- Larry (They/Them) (2024, Canada) by Catherine Legault
- Last Call at Maud's (1993, United States) by Paris Poirier
- The Last Supper (1994, Canada) by Cynthia Roberts
- Late Bloomers (1996, United States) by Julia Dyer and Gretchen Dyer
- Laughing Matters (2003, United States) by Andrea Meyerson
- Laughing Matters... More! (2006, United States) by Andrea Meyerson
- Le derrière (The Rear End) (1999, France) by Valérie Lemercier
- The Lesbian Avengers Eat Fire, Too (1993, United States) by Su Friedrich and Janet Baus
- Lesbian Space Princess (2024, Australia), by Emma Hough Hobbs and Leela Varghese
- Lesbiana: A Parallel Revolution (2012, Canada) by Myriam Fougère
- Let It Come Down: The Life of Paul Bowles (1998, Canada) by Jennifer Baichwal
- Lez Bomb (2018, United States) by Jenna Laurenzo
- Liebmann (The Strange Summer) (2016, Germany) by Jules Herrmann
- Life Partners (2014, United States) by Susanna Fogel
- Lightswitch (2009, Australia) by Emma Keltie
- Lily Festival (Yurisai) (2001, Japan) by Sachi Hamano
- Lines of Escape (Lignes de fuite) (2022, Canada) by Catherine Chabot and Miryam Bouchard
- Lingua Franca (2019, United States) by Isabel Sandoval
- Liz in September (Liz en Septiembre) (2014, Venezuela) by Fina Torres
- Lo Loves You (2017, Australia) by Cloudy Rhodes
- The Lollipop Generation (2008, Canada) by G. B. Jones
- Looking for Cheyenne (Oublier Cheyenne) (2005, France) by Valérie Minetto
- Lost and Delirious (2001, Canada) by Léa Pool
- Love and Other Catastrophes (1996, Australia) by Emma-Kate Croghan
- Love Is Not Perfect (L'amore è imperfetto) (2012, Italy) by Francesca Muci
- Love/Juice (2000, Japan) by Kaze Shindō
- Love Lies Bleeding (2024, United States) by Rose Glass
- Love Me Tender (2025, France) by Anna Cazenave Cambet
- Love, Scott (2018, Canada) by Laura Marie Wayne
- Lovesong (2016, United States) by So Yong Kim
- Loving Annabelle (2006, United States) by Katherine Brooks
- Loving Loretta (2008, Canada) by Andrea Gutsche

== M ==
- Ma Belle, My Beauty (2021, United States/France) by Marion Hill
- Mädchen in Uniform (Girls in Uniform) (1931, Germany) by Leontine Sagan
- Maggie and Annie (2002, United States) by Kimberly K. Wilson
- Make a Wish (aka Lesbian Psycho) (2002, United States) by Sharon Ferranti
- Mango Kiss (2004, United States) by Sascha Rice
- Manok (2025, South Korea) by Lee Yujin
- Mapplethorpe (2018, United States) by Ondi Timoner
- Margarita (2012, Canada) by Laurie Colbert and Dominique Cardona
- Margarita with a Straw (2014, India) by Shonali Bose
- Marguerite (2017, Canada) by Marianne Farley
- Marinette (2023, France) by Virginie Verrier
- Married in Canada (2010, Canada) by Arianne Robinson
- The Mars Canon (Kasei no Kanon) (2002, Japan) by Shiori Kazama
- Mary Marie (2011, United States) by Alexandra Roxo
- Me, Myself and Her (Io e Lei) (2015, Italy) by Maria Sole Tognazzi
- Meeting of Two Queens (Encuentro entre dos Reinas) (1991, Spain) by Cecilia Barriga
- Michelle Ross: Unknown Icon (2025, Canada) by Alison Duke
- The Midwife's Tale (1995, United States) by Megan Siler
- Miguel's War (2021, Germany/Spain/Lebanon) by Eliane Raheb
- Milkwater (2020, United States) by Morgan Ingari
- The Miseducation of Cameron Post (2018, United States/United Kingdom) by Desiree Akhavan
- Mississippi Damned (2009, United States) by Tina Mabry
- Mom + Mom (Mamma + Mamma) (2018, Italy) by Karole Di Tommaso
- Moments (1979, France/Israel) by Michal Bat-Adam
- Mommy Mommy (2007, Canada) by Sylvie Rosenthal
- The Monkey's Mask (2000, Multi-nation) by Samantha Lang
- Monster (2003, United States) by Patty Jenkins
- Montana (2017, Israel) by Limor Shmila
- A Montreal Girl (La Fille de Montréal) (2010, Canada) by Jeanne Crépeau
- Montreal, My Beautiful (Montréal, ma belle) (2025, Canada) by Xiaodan He
- More Beautiful for Having Been Broken (2019, United States) by Nicole Conn
- Mosquita y Mari (2012, United States) by Aurora Guerrero
- A Mother Apart (2024, Canada) by Laurie Townshend
- Mother Tongue (Lengua materna) (2010, Argentina) by Liliana Paolinelli
- Mr. Gay Syria (2017, Turkey/France/Germany) by Ayse Toprak
- My Animal (2023, Canada) by Jacqueline Castel
- My Days of Mercy (2017, United States/United Kingdom) by Tali Shalom Ezer
- My Father Is Coming (1991, Germany) by Monika Treut
- My First Summer (2020, Australia) by Katie Found
- My Friend from Faro (Mein Freund aus Faro) (2008, German) by Nana Neul
- My Left Breast (2000, Canada) by Gerry Rogers and Peg Norman
- My Mother Likes Women (A mi madre le gustan las mujeres) (2002, Spain) by Inés París and Daniela Fejerman
- My Prairie Home (2013, Canada) by Chelsea McMullan

== N ==
- Naomi and Ely's No Kiss List (2015, United States) by Kristin Hanggi
- Never Steady, Never Still (2017, Canada) by Kathleen Hepburn
- Nina's Heavenly Delights (2006, United Kingdom) by Pratibha Parmar
- Nitrate Kisses (1992, United States) by Barbara Hammer
- Nocturne (1990, United Kingdom) by Joy Chamberlain
- Nonsense Revolution (2008, Canada) by Ann Verrall
- November Moon (Novembermond) (1985, West Germany/France) by Alexandra von Grote
- The Novice (2021, United States) by Lauren Hadaway
- Nudo Mixteco (Mixtecan Knot) (2021, Mexico) by Ángeles Cruz

== O ==
- Octavio Is Dead! (2018, Canada) by Sook-Yin Lee
- The Old Guard (2020, United States) by Gina Prince-Bythewood
- The Oldest Lesbian in the World (2011, United States) by Renee Sotile and Mary Jo Godges
- Olivia (aka The Pit of Loneliness) (1951, France) by Jacqueline Audry
- The One (2011, United States) by Caytha Jentis
- Orchids, My Intersex Adventure (2010, Australia) by Phoebe Hart
- Orlando (1992, United Kingdom) by Sally Potter
- Our Love Story (2016, South Korea) by Lee Hyun-ju
- Out at the Wedding (2007, United States) by Lee Friedlander
- Out of Season (1998, United States) by Jeanette L. Buck
- Outerlands (2025, United States) by Elena Oxman
- The Owls (2010, United States) by Cheryl Dunye

== P ==
- The Paper Mirror: Drawing Alison Bechdel (2012, United States) by Charissa King-O'Brien
- Pariah (2011, United States) by Dee Rees
- Paris Is Burning (1990, United States) by Jennie Livingston
- Paris Was a Woman (1996, United Kingdom) by Greta Schiller
- Passage (2020, Canada) by Sarah Baril Gaudet
- The Passionate Pursuits of Angela Bowen (2016, United States) by Jennifer Abod and Mary Duprey
- A Perfect Ending (2012, United States) by Nicole Conn
- Perpetrator (2023, United States) by Jennifer Reeder
- Petit Mal (2022, Colombia) by Ruth Caudeli
- Polarized (2023, UK/Canada) by Shamim Sarif
- Porcupine Lake (2017, Canada) by Ingrid Veninger
- Portrait of a Lady on Fire (Portrait de la jeune fille en feu) (2019, France) by Céline Sciamma
- Portrait of Jason (1967, United States) by Shirley Clarke
- Pourquoi pas! (Why Not!) (1977, France) by Coline Serreau
- Power Alley (Levante) (2023, Brazil-France-Uruguay) by Lillah Halla
- The Power of the Dog (2021, Australia/New Zealand/United Kingdom/Canada) by Jane Campion
- Priest (1994, United Kingdom) by Antonia Bird
- Professor Marston and the Wonder Women (2017, United States) by Angela Robinson
- Prom Dates (2024, United States) by Kim O. Nguyen
- Puccini for Beginners (2006, United States) by Maria Maggenti
- Purple Sea (Viola di mare) (2009, Italy) by Donatella Maiorca

== Q ==
- The Queen of My Dreams (2023, Canada) by Fawzia Mirza
- Queen of the Andes (2020, Canada) by Jillian Acreman
- Queen Tut (2023, Canada) by Reem Morsi
- Queens of the Qing Dynasty (2022, Canada) by Ashley McKenzie
- Queer Hutterite (2016, Canada) by Laura O'Grady
- Queering the Script (2019, Canada) by Gabrielle Zilkha

== R ==
- Radical Harmonies (2002, United States) by Dee Mosbacher
- Rafiki (2018, Kenya) by Wanuri Kahiu
- Rain Beau's End (2021, United States) directed by Tracy Wren
- Raven's Touch (2015, United States) by Marina Rice Bader and Dreya Weber
- Rebel Dykes (2021, United Kingdom) by Harri Shanahan and Siân Williams
- Red Cow (Para Aduma) (2018, Israel) by Tsivia Barkai Yacov
- Red Doors (2005, United States) by Georgia Lee
- Reinventing Marvin (Marvin ou la belle éducation) (2017, France) Anne Fontaine
- Replay (La répétition) (2001, France/Canada) by Catherine Corsini
- Revoir Julie (Julie and Me) (1998, Canada) by Jeanne Crépeau
- Riot Girls (2019, Canada) by Jovanka Vuckovic
- Rome & Juliet (2006, Philippines) by Connie Macatuno
- Romeos (Romeos ... anders als du denkst!) (2011, Germany) by Sabine Bernardi
- Rough Night (2017, United States) by Lucia Aniello
- The Royal Road (2015, United States) by Jenni Olson
- Running on Empty Dreams (2009, United States) by Nitara Lee Osbourne

== S ==
- A Safe Distance (2026, Canada) by Gloria Mercer
- Saint Maud (2019, United Kingdom) by Rose Glass
- The Saint of Dry Creek (2015, United States) by Julie Zammarchi
- Salut Victor (1989, Canada) by Anne Claire Poirier
- Saving Face (2004, United States) by Alice Wu
- Se min kjole (Hush Little Baby) (2009, Denmark) by Hella Joof
- Season of Love (2019, United States) by Christin Baker
- Seduction: The Cruel Woman (Verführung: Die grausame Frau) (1985, West Germany) by Elfi Mikesch and Monika Treut
- Set Me Free (Emporte-moi) (1999, Canada) by Léa Pool
- Sévigné (2004, Spain) by Marta Balletbò-Coll
- The Sex of the Stars (Le sexe des étoiles) (1993, Canada) by Paule Baillargeon
- Shakedown (2018, United States) by Leilah Weinraub
- She: Their Love Story (She เรื่องรักระหว่างเธอ) (2012, Thailand) by Sarunya Noithai (สรัญญา น้อยไทย)
- She Must Be Seeing Things (1987, United States) by Sheila McLaughlin
- She's a Boy I Knew (2007, Canada) by Gwen Haworth
- Shiva Baby (2020, United States) by Emma Seligman
- Signature Move (2017, United States) by Jennifer Reeder
- Sister My Sister (1994, United Kingdom) by Nancy Meckler
- Sisterhood (Gwaat Mui) (2016, Macau/Hong Kong) by Tracy Choi
- Sisters (2024, United States) by Susie Yankou
- Skin Deep (1995, Canada) by Midi Onodera
- Sleeping Beauties (1999, United States) by Jamie Babbit
- Slip Away (2011, United States) by T.M. Scorzafava
- Small Talk (2016, Taiwan) by Huang Hui-chen
- Snapshots (2018, United States) by Melanie Mayron
- Softly, Softly (Sotto.. sotto.. strapazzato da anomala passione) (1984, Italy) by Lina Wertmüller
- Some Prefer Cake (1997, United States) by Heidi Arnesen
- Someone Great (2019, United States) by Jennifer Kaytin Robinson
- A Song Sung Blue (Xiǎo bái chuán) (2023, China) by Geng Zihan
- Sonja (2006, Germany) by Kirsi Marie Liimatainen
- Soul of the Desert (Alma del desierto) (2024, Colombia/Brazil) by Mónica Taboada-Tapia
- Spidarlings (2016, United Kingdom) by Selene Kapsaski
- Spider Lilies (Cì Qīng) (2007, Taiwan) by Zero Chou
- Stitches (2011, Israel) by Adiya Imri Orr
- The Stolen Diary (Le cahier volé) (1993, France) by Christine Lipinska
- Straight for the Heart (À corps perdu) (1988, Canada/Switzerland) by Léa Pool
- Stuff (2015, United States) by Suzanne Guacci
- Suicide Kale (2016, United States) by Carly Usdin
- The Summer of Sangailė (Sangailės vasara) (2015, Lithuania/France/Netherlands) by Alantė Kavaitė
- Summerland (2020, United Kingdom) by Jessica Swale
- Summertime (La Belle Saison) (2015, France/Belgium) by Catherine Corsini
- Supervoksen (Triple Dare) (2006, Denmark) by Christina Rosendahl
- Sweetheart (2021, United Kingdom) by Marley Morrison
- Sword of Trust (2019, United States) by Lynn Shelton
- Sworn Virgin (Vergine giurata) (2015, Italy/Germany/Switzerland/Albania/Kosovo) by Laura Bispuri

== T ==
- Take a Walk on the Wildside (2017, Canada) by Lisa Rideout
- Tallulah (2016, United States) by Sian Heder
- Tell It to the Bees (2018, United Kingdom) by Annabel Jankel
- Tender Fictions (1996, United States) by Barbara Hammer
- Thank God I'm a Lesbian (1992, Canada) by Dominique Cardona and Laurie Colbert
- They (2017, United States) by Anahita Ghazvinizadeh
- Thin Ice (1994, United Kingdom) by Fiona Cunningham-Reid
- Thirteen (2003, United States) by Catherine Hardwicke
- This Place (2022, Canada) by V. T. Nayani
- Three Veils (2011, United States) by Rolla Selbak
- Tick Tock Lullaby (2007, United Kingdom) by Lisa Gornick
- Ticket of No Return (Bildnis einer Trinkerin) (1979, Germany) by Ulrike Ottinger
- Tig (2015, United States) by Kristina Goolsby and Ashley York
- Time & Again (2019, United Kingdom) by Rachel Dax
- Titane (2021, France-Belgium) by Julia Ducournau
- To Each Her Own (2008, Canada) by Heather Tobin
- To the Stars (2019, United States) by Martha Stephens
- To Wong Foo, Thanks for Everything! Julie Newmar (1995, United States) by Beeban Kidron
- Today Match at 3 (Hoy partido a las 3) (2017, Argentina) by Clarisa Navas
- Toll (2023, Brazil) by Carolina Markowicz
- Tomboy (2008, Canada) by Barb Taylor
- Tomboy (2011, France) by Céline Sciamma
- Total Eclipse (1995, United Kingdom/France/Belgium) by Agnieszka Holland
- Tove (2020, Finland) by Zaida Bergroth
- Training Rules (2009, United States) by Dee Mosbacher and Fawn Yacker
- Transhood (2020, United States) by Sharon Liese
- Treading Water (2001, United States) by Lauren Himmel
- Trevor (1994, United States) by Peggy Rajski
- Tru Love (2013, Canada) by Shauna MacDonald and Kate Johnston
- The Truth About Jane (2000, United States) by Lee Rose
- Two 4 One (2014, Canada) by Maureen Bradley
- Two in the Bush: A Love Story (2017, United States) by Laura Madalinski

== U ==
- Under the Tuscan Sun (2003, United States) by Audrey Wells
- An Unexpected Love (2003, United States) by Lee Rose
- Untold: Deal with the Devil (2021, United States) by Laura Brownson

== V ==
- Valley Girl (2020, United States) by Rachel Lee Goldenberg
- Venus (2017, Canada) by Eisha Marjara
- A Village Affair (1995, United Kingdom) by Moira Armstrong
- Virgin Machine (Die Jungfrauenmaschine) (1988, Germany) by Monika Treut
- Vita and Virginia (2018, United Kingdom/Ireland) by Chanya Button

== W ==
- Waiting for the Moon (1987, United Kingdom-France-United States-West Germany) by Jill Godmilow
- Walk with Me (2021, United States) by Isabel del Rosal
- Wasaga (1994, Canada) by Judith Doyle
- Water Lilies (Naissance des Pieuvres) (2007, France) by Céline Sciamma
- The Watermelon Woman (1996, United States) by Cheryl Dunye
- We Forgot to Break Up (2017, Canada) by Chandler Levack
- We Forgot to Break Up (2024, Canada) by Karen Knox
- We'll Find Happiness (2025, Canada} by Léa Pool
- What's Cooking? (2000, United Kingdom/United States) by Gurinder Chadha
- When Night Is Falling (1995, Canada) by Patricia Rozema
- While You Weren't Looking (2015, South Africa) by Catherine Stewart
- Wild Chicks in Love (Die Wilden Hühner und die Liebe) (2007, Germany) by Vivian Naefe
- Wild Nights with Emily (2018, United States) by Madeleine Olnek
- With Every Heartbeat (aka Kiss Me) (Kyss mig) (2011, Sweden) by Alexandra-Therese Keining
- Without Men (2011, United States) by Gabriela Tagliavini
- Women Who Kill (2016, United States) by Ingrid Jungermann
- The World to Come (2020, United States) by Mona Fastvold
- The World Unseen (2007, South Africa/United Kingdom) by Shamim Sarif

== Y ==
- Yes or No (Yak Rak Ko Rak Loei) (2010, Thailand) by Sarasawadee Wongsompetch
- Yes or No 2 (Rak Mai Rak Ya Kak Loei) (2012, Thailand) by Sarasawadee Wongsompetch
- The Yo-Yo Gang (1992, Canada) by G.B. Jones
- Young & Wild (Joven y alocada) (2012, Chile) by Marialy Rivas
- You, Me and Him (2017, UK) by Daisy Aitkens
- You Will Be Mine (Je te mangerais) (2009, France) by Sophie Laloy
- Young Juliette (Jeune Juliette) (2019, Canada) by Anne Émond
- Your Sister's Sister (2011, United States) by Lynn Shelton
- Yuriko, Dasvidaniya (Yuriko, dasuvidânya; Yoshiko & Yuriko) (2011, Japan) by Sachi Hamano

== Z ==
- Zoe.Misplaced (2014, Australia) by Mekelle Mills

== See also ==
- List of female film and television directors
- List of lesbian filmmakers
- Lists of feature films with LGBT characters
- List of LGBTQ+-related films
- List of LGBTQ+-related films by storyline
- List of LGBTQ+-related films by year
