= Paris Lesbian and Feminist Film Festival =

Women-only film festival in France

Paris Lesbian and Feminist Film Festival Festival International du Film Lesbien et Féministe de Paris
- Location: Paris
- Established: 1989; 37 years ago
- Awards: Audience Awards
- Hosted by: Cineffable
- Language: French and English
- Website: Cineffable

The Paris Feminist and Lesbian Film Festival (French: Festival International du Film Lesbien et Féministe de Paris) is a women-only film festival founded in Paris, France, in 1989. The festival is organized by Cineffable, an association dedicated to promoting lesbian cinema, and encouraging lesbian creativity.

== History ==
The Paris Feminist and Lesbian Film Festival grew out of dissatisfaction with the treatment of Lesbians in the Créteil International Women's Film Festival. Many lesbian women felt that in spite of the fact that lesbian films frequently won the Viewers Choice awards (prix du public), lesbian films, filmmakers and attendees were not given sufficient space or attention at the festival, and so they decided to create their own event, which would not only provide lesbians with screening opportunities, but would also be a shared community for knowledge sharing, a way to increase lesbian visibility and combat lesbophobia, and a social outlet.

The first event was held in 1989, as a "cinéclub", with subsequent festivals in 1992 and 1993, all held at the La Clef Cultural Center in Paris. As the festival grew, it moved venues, first to the André Malraux Cultural Center (Le Kremlin-Bicêtre) until 2000, when the number of attendees grew to between 2000 and 3000, and then to the Le Trianon theater. Since 2010, the festival screens at l'Espace Reuilly.

== Organization ==
The festival is organized and produced by the Cineffable association. The association includes several thousand members, making it one of the more significant lesbian organizations in France. It is run according to feminist principles – it is non-hierarchical, based on knowledge sharing and transfer for continuity, and defines its mission statement as "we have to assume responsibility, to take control of our images, to become actresses in our own productions in order to break definitively with the oppressive system of representation that shuts us in, that shuts us up".

The festival is open to anyone who identifies as a woman, and is based on membership attendance; that is – attendance is free for members, and thus anyone desiring to attend the festival purchases a membership card, which provides access or discounts to other Cineffable events as well. The festival is self-funded, except for an annual grant from the city of Paris, as part of an official program for gender equality, and works on the principle of "no one left outside" through discounts for marginalized communities and a ticket sharing program, enabling access for all to screenings.

The festival includes several competition tracks, debates, an art exhibition, workshops and a gala or concert event. Audience awards are granted at the festival in the following categories:

- Feature film
- Feature-length documentary
- Short fiction film
- Short documentary
- Experimental film
- Animation

In previous years, there were also awards for best screenplay and best film poster.

The festival has grown steadily since its inception. It screens more than 50 films each year.

== Best Feature Film awards ==
Year	Film	Director	Country
2018	Extra Terrestres	Carla Cavina	Puerto Rico / Venezuela
2017	Signature Move	Jennifer Reeder	United States
2016	Io e Lei (Me, Myself, and Her)	Maria Sole Tognazzi	Italy
2015	Girltrash: All Night Long	Alexandra Kondracke	United States
2014	Moonlight People	Ekaterina Polyanskaya	Russia
2013	Facing Mirrors	Negar Azarbayjani	Iran / Germany
2012	Lengua materna	Liliana Paolinelli	Argentina
2011	En secret (Circumstance)	Maryam Keshavarz	USA / Iran / Lebanon
2010	no audience awards		
2009	Rain	Maria Govan	UK / Bahamas
2008	The World Unseen	Shamim Sarif	UK / South Africa
2007	Nina's Heavenly Delights	Pratibha Parmar	UK
2006 (tie)	Sévigné (Julia Berkowitz)	Marta Balletbò-Coll	Spain
2006 (tie)	Fremde Haut	Angelina Maccarone	Germany
2005	Hu Die (Butterfly)	Yan Yan Mak	Hong Kong
2004	Goldfish Memory	Liz Gill	Ireland
2003	Do I Love You?	Lisa Gornick	UK
2002	By Hook or by Crook	Harry Dodge (as Harriet Dodge) and Silas Howard	USA
2001	Chutney Popcorn	Nisha Ganatra	USA
2000	If These Walls Could Talk 2	Jane Anderson, Martha Coolidge and Anne Heche	USA
1999	Revoir Julie	Jeanne Crépeau	Canada
1998	Alles Wird Gut	Angelina Maccarone	Germany
1997	Fire	Deepa Mehta	USA
1996	Costa Brava	Marta Balletbò-Coll	Spain
1995	Life is a Woman	Shanna Serikbajewa	Kazakhstan
1994	Go Fish	Rose Troche	USA
1993	The Company of Strangers	Cynthia Scott	Canada
1992	Anne Trister	Léa Pool	Canada

== See also ==
- List of women's film festivals
