= Liz Mikel =

American actress

- Born: Elizabeth Juliene Lacy; November 7, 1963 (age 62); Dallas, Texas, USA
- Occupations: Actor, singer
- Years active: 1970–present
- Website: http://www.lizmikel.com/

Elizabeth Juliene Mikel (née Lacy; born November 7, 1963) is an American actress and jazz vocalist from Dallas, Texas. She is best known for her role as Corrina "Mama" Williams, mother of star running back Brian "Smash" Williams, on the NBC television series Friday Night Lights.

== Career ==
Liz Mikel has been performing on stage for more than twenty years, including extended runs with the Dallas Theater Center and Theater Three. In 2007, the Dallas Morning News described Mikel as "a fixture on the Dallas theater scene". She stepped in for Oprah Winfrey in a special 2008 performance of The Vagina Monologues.

Her film credits include roles in The Quest for Freedom, It's in the Water, Detention (aka Learning Curve), Seventy-8, Carried Away, and as Ruthie Jenkins in Welcome Home, Roscoe Jenkins. Besides Friday Night Lights, television roles have included guest appearances on LAX, Prison Break, and Past Life plus a recurring role as Maggie on Sordid Lives: The Series.

Dallas Morning News theater critic Jerome Weeks once described Mikel's voice as "an immense, joyful force" and stated, "If a mountain range could belt a bawdy song, it would sound like Mikel."

Liz starred on Broadway in Lysistrata Jones, for which the New York Times praised her performance as "commanding."

== Awards and honors ==
In 1998, Mikel received the Leon Rabin Award for "Outstanding Performance by an Actress in a Musical" from the Dallas Theatre League. She has also been the recipient of the Sankofa Award for her "dedication to the Arts in the Community" and the Dallas Theater Critics Forum Award 2004 for her role in Ain't Misbehavin. D Magazine named Mikel "Best Actress" in their 2004 "Best of Big D" issue. The Dallas Weekly featured her as "Queen of the Arts: The Face of Black Theater in Dallas" in March 2006. Mikel was awarded The 2008 Column Theater Award for "Best Actress in a Musical-Equity" for Caroline, or Change.

== Fire ==
On January 7, 2010, the Holly Hills apartment complex in Dallas where Mikel lived burned to the ground, destroying all of Mikel's clothing, possessions, and memorabilia. The local arts community responded with a series of benefit concerts, and the Dallas Theater Center announced they would donate "100 percent of all ticket sales" from the world-premiere performance of the musical, Give It Up!, in which Mikel appears.

== Filmography ==
=== Film ===
Year	Title	Role	Notes
1992	The Quest for Freedom	Ben's Mother	
1997	It's in the Water	Viola Johnson	
2004	Seventy-8	Sunset	
2008	Welcome Home, Roscoe Jenkins	Ruthie Jenkins	
2009	Carried Away	Restaurant Manager	
2012	Bending the Rules	Fat Dee	
2013	Straight A's	Nurse Viola	
2013	The Secret Life of Walter Mitty	TSA Skeleton #2	
2014	Dakota's Summer	Ms. Judd	
2014	Get On Up	Gertrude Sanders	
2014	Salvation	Emily	TV movie
2014	Jazz Lessons	Mama Jacqui	Short film
2016	Dead Awake	Nurse	
2020	Miss Juneteenth	Betty Ray	
2021	The Blazing World	Dr. Cruz	

=== Television ===
Year	Title	Role	Notes
2004	LAX	Angry woman	Episode: "Pilot"
2006	Prison Break	Correctional officer	Episode: "Unearthed"
2006-2008	Friday Night Lights	Corrina "Mama" Williams	Recurring role, 26 episodes
2008	Sordid Lives: The Series	Maggie	Recurring role, 4 episodes
2010	Past Life	Alma	Recurring role, 2 episodes
2013	Dallas	Judge Rhonda Mason	Recurring role, 2 episodes

=== Theatre ===
Year(s)	Production	Role	Location	Category
2010	Give It Up!	Hetaira	Dallas Theater Center	Regional
2011	Lysistrata Jones	Hetaira	Transport Group Theatre Company	Off-Broadway
2011	Lysistrata Jones	Hetaira	Walter Kerr Theatre	Broadway
2022	1776	John Hancock	American Repertory Theater	Regional
2022	1776	John Hancock	American Airlines Theatre	Broadway
2023	1776	Benjamin Franklin		National Tour
