= Anatomy of a Love Seen =

2014 film by Marina Rice Bader

- Theatrical release poster
- Directed by: Marina Rice Bader
- Written by: Marina Rice Bader
- Produced by: Jan Miller Corran
- Starring: Sharon Hinnendael; Jill Evyn; Constance Brenneman; Marina Rice Bader
- Cinematography: Justin Kane
- Edited by: Vanara Taing
- Music by: Thom Robson
- Production company: Soul Kiss Films
- Release date: July 18, 2014 (North America)
- Running time: 80 minutes
- Country: United States
- Language: English

Anatomy of a Love Seen is a 2014 American erotic romantic drama film written and directed by Marina Rice Bader. The film stars Sharon Hinnendael and Jill Evyn.

== Plot ==
Zoe (Sharon Hinnendael) and Mal (Jill Evyn) are two actresses who meet while filming a movie where they're cast as lovers. They end up falling in love in the process and all seems to go well until months later when Mal abandons her lover just when Zoe's career starts to really take off. While it appears that Mal had little reason to leave her lover, the truth is that Mal was formerly a drug addict and was afraid that Zoe would leave her, so she left Zoe before this could happen. The two end up being drawn back together when they're called back by Kara (Marina Rice Bader), the film director, to re-shoot their sex scene for TV network distribution.

Zoe and Mal initially have a problem acting as both have pent-up feelings for each other, but Anne Pasternak (Constance Brenneman), the film's producer, helps them to work professionally. Anne also comforts both Zoe and Mal individually and keeps their confidence afloat. Zoe gets a call from her agent, who tells her that she should not have any shooting today. Zoe is then suspicious and calls Kara out. Kara then reveals to Zoe that there is no broadcast deal and she did this to ensure Zoe and Mal got back together. Zoe is upset upon hearing this and starts having a nervous breakdown. Anne once again helps calm the situation and Mal also calms Zoe down and kisses her. This decreases the tension between them and they are finally able to shoot the first scene.

Everyone is happy that they can move to the next shot. Zoe and Mal have a moment together and Zoe questions her why Mal left her. Mal explains her reason but Zoe is still upset and they end up arguing which prompts Kara and Anne to intervene, this finally leads to Kara revealing that there was no broadcast deal and that Kara was amazed to see Zoe and Mal fall in love with each other six months ago on the same set. She wanted Zoe and Mal to get back together and prove that love does exist. Kara then ends up canceling the shoot and packs up. Anne follows and demands to know the whole truth as she had worked for 15 years with Kara. Anne also tells her that she wanted Kara to notice her efforts. Kara then replies that Anne has always done an amazing job and that she is Anne's biggest fan. Anne then tells Kara that she loves her and kisses Kara (which surprises her).

Mal and Zoe continue to argue, and Zoe tells Mal that she is exactly like her mother. This upsets Mal, who locks herself in the restroom. Zoe apologizes for what she said and tries to console her, but Mal does not give in. Zoe then leaves the studio and sits in the middle of the road. Mal then comes searching for her and the two end up staring at each other with tears in both of their eyes.

The film concludes with a flashback scene to six months earlier where both Mal and Zoe fell in love with each other after filming their sex scene and that they went home and had sex with each other (for real and off-camera) for the first time.

== Cast ==
- Sharon Hinnendael as Zoe Peterson
- Jill Evyn as Mal Ford
- Constance Brenneman as Anne Pasternak
- Marina Rice Bader as Kara Voss
- Kieran Valla as Kieran Scardovi

== Reception ==
AfterEllen gave Anatomy of a Love Seen a positive review, writing that "As a director, Rice Bader has an eye for composition, and creates quite a few beautiful shots throughout the film." Curve also praised the film, writing "Anatomy of a Love Seen is a powerful and poignant film. This movie will send you on an emotional rollercoaster, but it’s worth every moment."

== See also ==
- List of LGBT-related films directed by women
