= Marina Rice Bader =

Canadian-American writer, director, and film producer

- Born: Canada
- Occupation: Writer, director, producer
- Genre: LGBT+ Drama, Romance
- Years active: 2009–present
- Notable works: Anatomy of a Love Seen (2014); A Perfect Ending (2012), Elena Undone (2010)
- Notable awards: Best Feature Producer - 2012 - LA Femme Filmmaker Award, Audience Award - 2010 - Reel Pride Film Festival

Website
- playbigpictures.com

Marina Rice Bader is a writer, director, and film producer. She is known for the films Anatomy of a Love Seen (2014), Raven's Touch (2015), and Ava's Impossible Things (2016). She was executive producer for Elena Undone (2010) and A Perfect Ending (2012). She started the Soul Kiss Films production company in 2009. She champions the LGBTQ+ community, saying "We could use more films with well-rounded LGBTQ+ characters, and I hope in some way I’m helping to address that issue."

== Moviemaking ==
Until Bader was in her 50s, she had never been "in love with a woman before, never even kissed a woman. So, when you are walking into an entirely new world, you do your research by watching movies," she said. That was when Bader saw the need for more good lesbian films: "I rented so many lesbian movies, and noticed there were some great ones, but not much of a library to choose from. In response Bader founded Soul Kiss Films, an independent company dedicated to producing compelling movies with a unique focus on the female experience.

Her first project out of the gate was to executive produce Elena Undone, followed by A Perfect Ending two years later. In 2014 Marina felt driven to go down a more authentic path, writing, directing and acting in Anatomy of a Love Seen, where she created an exciting new model of filmmaking not only during production, but with her creative distribution, earning much publicity. Next came Raven's Touch, which she produced and co-directed with powerhouse Dreya Weber in 2015. Bader's fifth film Ava's Impossible Things, which she wrote, directed, and produced, premiered at Outfest Los Angeles 2016. Ava’s Impossible Things was the first film to receive an investment from Vimeo’s “Share the Screen” female filmmaking fund, which was launched at the 2016 Sundance Film Festival to support emerging female voices in film.

"I have always had a love affair with movies, but it wasn’t until my early fifties that I had enough faith in myself to make the leap to actually creating them,” says Bader. “I’m excited to be a filmmaker at this time in history, when women are working to lift each other up and gender disparity is being discussed in a big way. The first step in fixing a problem is by shouting it from the rooftops, and I’m extremely proud to be part of the solution.”

Up next she has two feature projects under the banner of her new production company, Play Big Pictures, producing bold universal stories told through the female lens.

== Personal life ==
Marina has four adult children and currently lives as a nomad, although she considers Los Angeles her home base. She was in a relationship with director Nicole Conn.

== See also ==
- List of female film and television directors
- List of lesbian filmmakers
- List of LGBT-related films directed by women
