= Il Vento e le Rose =

- Directed by: Elisa Bolognini
- Written by: Kanō Kyōko(novel); Junko Sakamoto (screenplay)
- Produced by: Izumi Yamashita
- Starring: Kanō Kyōko
- Cinematography: Maura Morales Bergmann
- Edited by: Yoshie Kaneko
- Music by: Nahoko Kakiage
- Distributed by: Pony Canyon
- Release date: 9 May 2009 (Japan)
- Running time: 73 minutes
- Countries: Italy; Japan
- Languages: Italian; English

Il Vento e le Rose (Japanese: 愛するということ Ai-suru to iu koto; English: The Awakening of Love) is a 2009 Japanese-Italian movie directed by Elisa Bolognini and starring Kanō Kyōko and Maria Cocchiarella Arismendi.

Set in Italy, it tells the story of an inhibited young woman from a small Italian town who discovers passion and sexuality when she meets a free-spirited and glamorous Japanese woman.

== Cast and characters ==
- Kanō Kyōko as Koko
- Maria Cocchiarella Arismendi as Giorgia
- Raffaella Panichi as Giorgia's grandmother
- Antonio Matessich as gentleman
- Alessandro Calabrò as Andrea
- Vincent Papa as Bulter
- Alessio Sica as Black-haired man
- Paride Moccia as The blonde
- Romano Fortuna as Servant

== See also ==
- List of LGBT-related films directed by women
