= Traci Dinwiddie =

American film and television actress

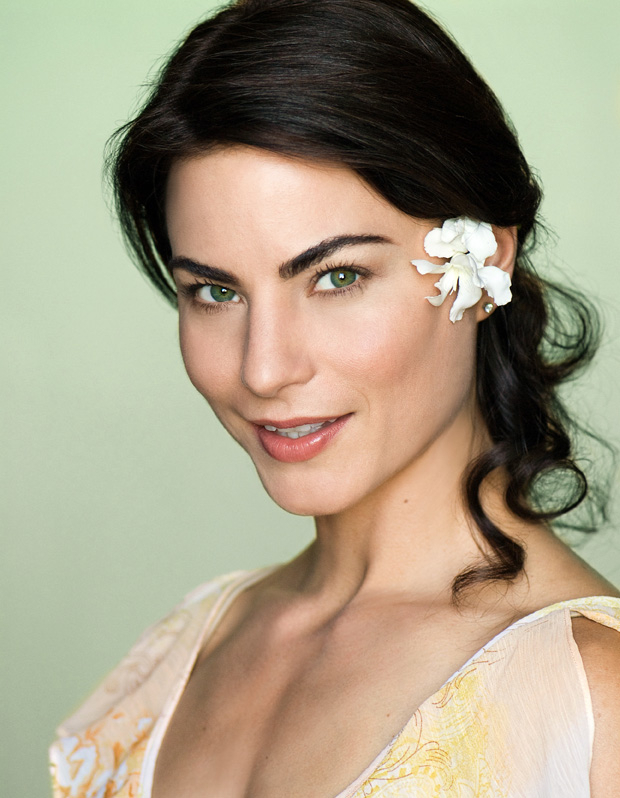
- Born: Anchorage, Alaska, U.S.
- Occupation: Actress
- Years active: 1989–present
- Known for: Supernatural as Pamela Barnes; Elena Undone as Peyton Lombard; The Walking Dead as Regina
- Height: 5 ft 7 in (1.70 m)

Traci Dinwiddie is an American actress. Her most notable roles were in Supernatural (2008–2010; 2019), and as Regina in season 8 of The Walking Dead (2017–2018).

== Early years ==
Dinwiddie was born in Anchorage, Alaska to a father of Syrian and English descent and a mother of Cherokee and Irish descent. She graduated from Northwest Guilford High School in Guilford County, North Carolina in 1992. She lived in Wilmington, North Carolina, for 12 years, and for part of that time she operated a front-end loader and forklift at a landscaping supply business in nearby Ogden, North Carolina. She moved to Los Angeles in 2007.

== Career ==
While living in North Carolina, Dinwiddie portrayed the title character in City Stage's production of the musical Always … Patsy Cline.

Dinwiddie made her film debut in 1998 movie Target Earth. She has appeared in films including Summer Catch (2001), Black Knight (2001), The Notebook (2004), End of the Spear (2006), Mr. Brooks (2007), Elena Undone (2010), Raven's Touch (2015), and Stuff (2015). She has also appeared on the TV shows One Tree Hill, two episodes of Dawson's Creek, and has appeared alongside Jared Padalecki and Jensen Ackles in five episodes of Supernatural.

From 2017 to 2018, she joined the cast of season 8 of The Walking Dead as Regina.

== Filmography ==
=== Film ===
Year	Title	Role	Notes
1995	Marriage	Shizuka (voice)	Video
1995	Sailor Victory	Reiko Takagi (voice)	Video
1997	Princess Rouge	Vega (voice)	Video
1998	Blue Submarine No. 6	Freeda Verasco (voice)	Video
2001	Summer Catch	Lauren Hodges	
2002	Leo	Diane	
2003	All the Real Girls	Tonya	
2003	Ball of Wax	Nat Packard	
2003	Dog Nights	Ragnell	
2004	The Notebook	Veronica	
2005	End of the Spear	Marilou McCully	
2005	The Pigs	Kelly	
2007	Mr. Brooks	Sarah Leaves	
2007	The Anatolian	Jasmine	
2007	Dead Heist	Kate	
2007	The Kopper Kettle	Alice	Short film
2007	The Brass Teapot	Alice	Short film
2007	The Touch	Renee	Short film
2008	The Candlelight Murders	Det. Janice Tischler	
2008	15-40	Sofie Bjarnson	
2008	The 27 Club	Catherine	
2008	Open Your Eyes	Julia	Short film
2008	Taboo	Rose	Short film
2009	The Passenger	Erika Currie	Short film
2010	Elektra Luxx	Madeline	
2010	Elena Undone	Peyton Lombard	
2010	The Necklace	Christie	Short film
2011	to.get.her	Ruth	
2011	Purple & Green	Maya	Short film
2012	Y: The Last Man Rising	Victoria	Short film
2012	Destiny Road	Fiona	
2014	The Midnight Swim	Mother	
2015	Stuff	Jamie	
2015	Raven's Touch	Kate	
2015	Anhedonia	Anhedonia	Short film
TBA	Awakened	Lula	Post-production

=== Television ===
Year	Title	Role	Notes
1989	Earthian	Elvira (voice)	OVA
1996	Shinesman	Kyoko Sakakibara (voice)	OVA
1997–1998	Voogie's Angel	Rebecca Sweet Heisen (voice)	TV series
1998	Target Earth	Dep. Madeline Chandler	TV film
1998	Dawson's Creek	Sam	"Baby"
2003	One Tree Hill	Waitress	"With Arms Outstretched"
2004	3: The Dale Earnhardt Story	Connie	TV film
2008–2010, 2019	Supernatural	Pamela Barnes	5 episodes
2009	90210	Madame Flanagan	"Between a Sign and a Hard Place"
2011	Make It or Break It	Katerina Paynich	"Worlds Apart", "What Lies Beneath"
2012	Zombies VS. Ninjas: The Web Series	Tanzy / Various (voice)	Regular role
2014	Franklin & Bash	Laurie	"Deep Throat"
2017–2018	The Walking Dead	Regina	12 episodes
2020	The Aerialist	Hathaway	film
