= Susan Duerden =

British actress

- Born: 20 September 1973 (age 52); Kensington, London, England
- Occupations: Actress; narrator
- Years active: 1997–present

Susan Duerden (born 20 September 1973) is a British actress and audiobook narrator. Her roles include the character of Carole Littleton in the television series Lost. She has performed on television, film, and theater.

== Filmography ==
=== Film ===
- Romance and Rejection (1997) – Woman in Pub
- Clubhouse Detectives in Search of a Lost Princess (2002) – Marian
- The First Vampire: Don't Fall for the Devil's Illusions (2004) – Sister Ingrid
- Supervolcano (2005) – Fiona Lieberman
- Wannabe (2005) – Kate Hastings
- Love Wrecked (2005) – Bree Taylor
- A Midsummer Night's Rewrite (2006) – Kate / Tatiana
- Unrest (2006) – Jasmin Blanchard- uncredited
- Flushed Away (2006) – Mother
- Luck of the Draw (2007) – Victoria
- Like Magic (2007) – Jennifer
- My Insignificant Other (2007) – Mel
- Double Duty (2009) – Sophia
- Postman Pat: The Movie (2014) - Sara Clifton
- Ava's Impossible Things (2016)
- Surface if Last Scattering (2016)
- Branded (2017) - Kate
- Forget About Nick (2017) - Jane

=== Television ===
- Verdict (1998) – Heather Smart
- Holby City (2000) – Amelia Ford
- Emmerdale (1999–2001) – Claudia Nash
- The Vice (2001) – Sarah
- The Bill (1997–2001) – Sally/Emily Speaks
- Attachments (2001) – Paula
- Doctors (2002) – Dr. Alison James
- Night and Day (2003) – Samantha
- The Unit (2008) – Lara Beerson
- Lost (2008–09) – Carole Littleton
- Zen (2011) – Evie
- Waterloo Road (2011) – Lilly Manson
- Zen (2011) - Evie
- NCIS (2015)- Lorraine Mallard
- Days Of Our Lives (2016) - recurring character Vicky Bush/Lauren De Cour
- Berlin Station (2019)

=== Video games ===
- Flushed Away (2006) – Rita
- The Last Remnant (2008) – Emma Honeywell
- Dragon Age: Origins (2009) – Additional voices
- Final Fantasy XIV (2010)
- Dragon Age II (2011) – Hadriana, Tarohne, Additional Voices

== Accolades ==
- Booklist's "Editors’ Choice: Media" for The Eyre Affair (2010)
- AudioFile's Best Voice in Fiction & Classics for The Tiger’s Wife (2011)
- Booklist's "Editors’ Choice: Media" for The Tiger’s Wife (2011)
- Booklist's "Amazing Audiobooks for Young Adults" for Chime (2012)
- Booklist's "Listen List" for The Tiger’s Wife (2012)
- Audie Award nominations for Chime and Eloisa James' When Beauty Tamed the Beast (2012)
- YALSA "Amazing Audiobook" pick for Chime (2012)
- Group Audie Award nomination for "Distinguished Achievement in Production" for Bram Stoker's Dracula (2013)
