= A Montreal Girl =

2010 film by Jeanne Crépeau

- French: La Fille de Montréal
- Directed by: Jeanne Crépeau
- Written by: Jeanne Crépeau
- Produced by: Jeanne Crépeau
- Starring: Amélie Grenier; Réal Bossé; Marie-Hélène Montpetit; Jean Turcotte
- Cinematography: Sylvaine Dufaux; Mark Morgenstern
- Edited by: Louise Dugal
- Production company: Boxfilms
- Release date: October 14, 2010 (FNC)
- Running time: 92 minutes
- Country: Canada
- Language: French

A Montreal Girl (French: La Fille de Montréal) is a Canadian drama film, directed by Jeanne Crépeau and released in 2010. The film stars Amélie Grenier as Ariane, a lesbian filmmaker who has lived in the same apartment in Montreal's rapidly gentrifying Le Plateau-Mont-Royal district since her student days, but who is now confronted in her 40s with a renoviction notice giving her six months to vacate the apartment.

The film also stars Réal Bossé, Marie-Hélène Montpetit and Jean Turcotte as Ariane's core circle of friends.

Semi-autobiographical, the film started out as a documentary about Crépeau's own real-life eviction from her longtime apartment before evolving into a narrative fiction film, and was shot in her real apartment.

The film premiered at Montreal's Festival du nouveau cinéma in 2010, before going into limited commercial release in early 2011.

== See also ==
- List of LGBT films directed by women
