= Little Man (2005 film) =

- Film poster
- Directed by: Nicole Conn
- Release date: April 2005 (Cleveland)
- Country: United States
- Language: English

Little Man (stylized as little man) is a 2005 American documentary film by Nicole Conn. The film was intended to document surrogate pregnancy, but the baby was delivered 100 days early. Instead, the film documents experiences of a family dealing with an extremely premature birth involving 158 days in a NICU (neonatal intensive care unit).
