= Drifting Flowers =

- Film poster
- 漂浪青春
- Directed by: Zero Chou
- Written by: Zero Chou
- Produced by: Liu Yun-Hou
- Cinematography: Hoho Liu Yun-Ho
- Edited by: Zero Chou; Hoho Liu
- Music by: Christine Hsu
- Production company: Third Vision Films
- Distributed by: Three Dots Entertainment
- Release dates: February 12, 2008 (Berlin Film Festival); August 18, 2008 (Taiwan)
- Running time: 97 minutes
- Country: Taiwan
- Language: Mandarin

Drifting Flowers (Chinese: 漂浪青春; pinyin: Piào làng qīngchūn) is a 2008 Taiwanese lesbian drama film by director Zero Chou. The original Chinese title means “The Drifting Waves of Youth.”

Drifting Flowers had its world premiere on February 12, 2008, at the Berlin Film Festival as an official Panorama selection.

== Plot ==
The story takes place in three acts, and themes of love and abandonment predominate. Characters deal with lesbianism and gender dysphoria.

== Cast and characters ==
- Pai Chih-Ying as Meigo
- Serena Fang as Jing
- Chao Yi-Lan as Chalkie
- Lu Yi-Ching as Lily
- Sam Wang as Yen

== Critical response ==
Variety called the film "the most professionally made of [Chou's] three features to date, but with a weakly developed script that doesn’t plumb far beneath the surface."

The Hollywood Reporter said the movie is Chou's strongest film to date, "yet it still lacks a script strong enough to pull it all together."

AfterEllen said the tripartite story line is "one of the movie’s greatest strengths, as each scene hits the emotional high notes and captures quiet moments with equal aplomb."

== Home media ==
The film was released in DVD format in Region 1 on February 3, 2009, by Wolfe Video; and in Region 3 on September 10, 2009, by Hoker Records. It was released on Blu-ray in region-free format on July 24, 2009, by Hoker Records.

== See also ==
- List of LGBT films directed by women
- List of lesbian filmmakers
