= It's in the Water =

- Directed by: Kelli Herd
- Written by: Kelli Herd
- Produced by: Dee Evans; Jonathan Ladd
- Starring: Keri Jo Chapman; Teresa Garrett; Derrick Sanders; Timothy Vahle; Nancy Chartier; John Hallum
- Edited by: Rusty Martin
- Distributed by: Wolfe Video
- Release date: 1997
- Running time: 100 minutes
- Country: United States
- Language: English

It's in the Water is a 1997 independent film. Written and directed by Kelli Herd, the film touches on themes of homosexuality, AIDS, coming out and small-town prejudice. The film stars Keri Jo Chapman, Teresa Garrett, Derrick Sanders, Timothy Vahle, Nancy Chartier and John Hallum.

== Plot ==
Alex is a married Junior Leaguer with a penchant for interesting shoes. Her Junior League chapter's annual project is to volunteer at Hope House, an AIDS hospice that recently opened in her home town of Azalea Springs, Texas. Alex and her League friends, including her friend Sloan, tour Hope House. Alex runs into her best friend Spencer, whose lover Bruce is a resident, and Grace, a friend from high school who had recently moved back to Azalea Springs to work at Hope House as a nurse.

That night at the town's annual Azalea Ball, a drunken Spencer tells a society matron that his homosexuality was caused by drinking the local water. An equally drunken Sloan overhears and spreads the story. A panic ensues, with the local newspaper printing the story and commissioning testing of the water supply. Mark, the son of the publisher, objects to his father, but because Mark is himself struggling with his homosexuality and attending meetings of an ex-gay group at the local church, he's limited in what he can do to mitigate the story and the resultant damage. The leader of the ex-gay group, Brother Daniel, announces plans to protest for the closing of Hope House.

Alex and Grace renew their friendship and Grace comes out as a lesbian to her. Grace returned to Azalea Springs because her husband found out about an affair she was having with another woman and is now in prison for assaulting Grace.

At an ex-gay meeting, Mark meets Tomas, a painter. Mark hires Tomas to re-paint his dining room.

The Junior League decides not to continue volunteering at Hope House. Alex, who's resigned from the League, goes to work full-time at the hospice over her husband Robert's objections.

Alex develops some curiosity about her possible lesbianism and rents a number of classic lesbian-themed films: Desert Hearts; Lianna; Personal Best; Heavenly Creatures; Bar Girls; Claire of the Moon; The Incredibly True Adventure of Two Girls in Love; an unnamed, presumably pornographic video; and, mixed in among them, The Godfather Part III, which serves as mainstream cover for the other selections and elicits a bemused look from the counter clerk, who has been loudly reading out the titles.

At Hope House, Alex gives in to her growing attraction to Grace and they kiss passionately in a supply room. Sloan catches them and spreads the story all over town. After Tomas paints Mark's dining room, they go out on a dinner date, where Mark learns that Tomas stumbled into the ex-gay meeting by mistake. After dinner they go to Tomas's studio and Tomas shows Mark his paintings. They make love. Reaction is immediate and hostile, with Alex suffering indignities great and small, everything from the breakup of her marriage to the closing of her credit account at the local fried pie shop.

Following this, Mark gains the courage to break up with the woman he's been dating as a "beard" and to come out to his father. He demands that his father drop the story on the water supply (testing proves that the water is completely ordinary) and stop the negative coverage of Hope House.

Mark and Tomas and Alex and Grace go out dancing at a big-city gay club, where they see Ray Ray, the son of Alex's family housekeeper, performing as a drag queen called Obsession. Ray Ray leads Mark and Tomas to a leather bar where they catch ex-gay leader Brother Daniel in full leather gear (Mark has a photo published in the paper to discredit Brother Daniel's anti-Hope House protests). Meanwhile, Alex and Grace go to a hotel room where they make love for the first time.

Back in Azalea Springs, Spencer's lover Bruce dies of AIDS-related complications. At his funeral, Alex's father comforts her and her mother, while still upset over Alex's lesbianism, shows that she still loves her daughter (by insulting her shoes, something she's done repeatedly through the film).

== Cast ==
- Keri Jo Chapman as Alex Stratton
- Teresa Garrett as Grace Miller
- Derrick Sanders as Mark Anderson
- Timothy Vahle as Tomas
- Barbara Lasater as Lily Talbott
- Nancy Chartier as Sloan
- Beverly May as Vivien Bracken
- Kathy Morath as Pamela Hughs
- Matthew Tompkins as Robert Stratton (credited as Matthew S.Tompkins)
- John Hallum as Spencer
- Larry Randolph as Bruce
- Susan Largo as Elizabeth Miller
- Liz Mikel as Viola Johnson
- Dion Culberson as Ray 'Ray-Ray' Johnson (also as 'Obsession')
- John Addington as Brother Daniel
- Gail Cronauer as Harriet

== Reviews ==
AfterEllen.com summed up with "the film is cheesy but enjoyable. There aren't many lesbian romantic comedies about middle and upper-middle-class women, and that combined with the two strong female leads, an interesting story, and good production quality make this film better than most independent lesbian films, and worth watching."

== Awards ==
- Philadelphia International Gay & Lesbian Film Festival - Audience Award (1997)

== DVD release ==
It's In the Water was released on Region 1 DVD on May 9, 2000.
