= Nicole Conn =

American film director (born 1959)

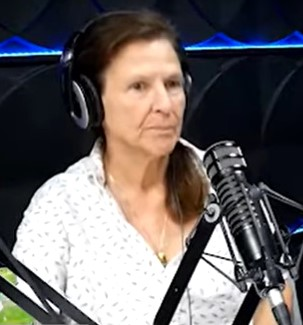
- Conn in 2023
- Born: October 29, 1959 (age 66); Mesa, Arizona, U.S.
- Education: Elliott Business College, 1986
- Occupations: Film director, producer, screenwriter
- Writing career
- Years active: 1992–present
- Website: nicoleconn.com

Nicole Conn (born October 29, 1959) is an American film director, novelist, producer, and screenwriter most famous for her debut feature, the lesbian love story Claire of the Moon (1992). Her screenplay for Claire of the Moon was also released as a novel the following year.

== Early life and education ==
Conn was born in Mesa, Arizona, and graduated from Elliot Business College in Portland, Oregon.

== Career ==
Conn received a degree in business and began her filmmaking career with the goal of bringing non-mainstream screenplays to wider audiences. She is a co-founder of Preemie World, a website created to help connect NICU professionals and the parents of premature babies with resources and tools.

In June 2023, Conn was on the Producers Guild of America's Pride and Leadership virtual panel.

=== Companies ===
- Demi-Monde Productions (1987)
- Little Man Nicholas, LLC (2002)

=== little man ===
Conn's 2005 documentary little man is about the extremely premature birth of her son, Nicholas. Born 100 days too early, Nicholas weighed only one pound. The film is the winner of many film festival awards from around the United States. Including 12 Best Documentary Awards along with Cedar Sinai's Courageous Beginnings Award.

== Personal life ==
Conn is a lesbian. She was in a relationship with Marina Rice Bader. Conn has two children: Gabrielle Baba-Conn and Nicholas James Baba-Conn.

== Filmography ==
Year	Title	Director	Writer	Producer	Editor	Notes
1992	Claire of the Moon	Yes	Yes	No	No	Feature film Also based on her novel
1996	Cynara: Poetry in Motion	Yes	Yes	Executive	No	Short film
2005	little man	Yes	No	Yes	Yes	Documentary film
2010	Elena Undone	Yes	Yes	No	Yes	Feature film
2011	Coming Undone	No	No	Co-producer	No	Concert movie
2012	A Perfect Ending	Yes	Yes	No	Yes	Feature film
2014	Jen Foster: She	Yes	Yes	Yes	Yes	Music video
2019	More Beautiful for Having Been Broken	Yes	Yes	Yes	Yes	Feature film

== Bibliography ==
- The Wedding Dress
- 1993: Claire of the Moon
- 1995: Passion's Shadow
- 1997: Angel Wings
- 2001: She Walks in Beauty

== See also ==
- List of female film and television directors
- List of lesbian filmmakers
- List of LGBT-related films directed by women
