= Montana (2017 film) =

2017 film by Limor Shmila

- Directed by: Limor Shmila
- Screenplay by: Limor Shmila
- Produced by: Tami Leon; Chilik Michaeli; Avraham Pirchi
- Starring: Noa Biron; Netta Shpigelman
- Cinematography: Eitan Hatuka
- Edited by: Dafi Farbman; Ido Lahmi
- Music by: Asher Goldschmidt
- Release date: September 10, 2017
- Running time: 79 minutes
- Country: Israel
- Language: Hebrew

Montana is a 2017 Israeli drama film written and directed by Limor Shmila in her directorial debut. The film premiered at the Toronto International Film Festival on September 10, 2017, and made its Israeli debut in October 2017 at the Haifa International Film Festival, where lead actress Noa Biron won the Best Actress award.

== Plot Synopsis ==
When her grandfather dies, Efi returns to her home town of Acco. She is greeted by her grandmother, and her aunt and uncle, and immediately, old wounds surface, and it is clear that Efi has been away for a long time. Efi meets Keren, the neighbor, who is married with children, and the two women begin a love affair. Not much is disclosed about Efi, except that years before she left with her mother for France, and her mother did not return with her. It is only when Efi meets Maya, Keren's young daughter, that we begin to understand what made her leave, and as the family secrets unfold, the love story becomes a journey to settle old accounts.

== Cast ==
- Noa Biron – Efi
- Netta Shpigelman – Keren
- Avi Malka – Uncle
- Keren Tsur – Aunt
- Hava Ortman – Grandmother
- Hai Maor – Avi
- Neta Orbach – Maya

== Release ==
The film premiered at the Toronto International Film Festival in the Discovery section, on September 10, 2017, where it met with mostly rave reviews. It then premiered in its country of origin in October 2017, at the Haifa International Film Festival. At the festival, Noa Biron won the Best Actress award. The film garnered two nominations for the Israeli Film Academy Ophir Awards – for Best Supporting Actress (Shpigelman) and Best Casting (Shmila).

== Reception ==
Israel

Film critic Eitan Weitz called Montana "a charming and moving film", citing the simplicity and humanity evident in the treatment of traumatic secrets and familial relationships. In Walla!Culture, Avner Shavit gave the film three out of five stars, and praised the depiction of the relationship between the two women, saying "the click between them and their immediate passion scorch the screen." Maariv critic Iris Jourlette also called the film "moving", commended lead actress Noa Biron, and speculated that the film might take the "Israeli Oscar", the Ophir Award.

Uri Klain, on the other hand, thought the film "failed to take off", and found it "amateurish". Ron Fogel also thought there was incompleteness in the film and indications of "unripeness" in its making, but also found it "refreshing" and praised the casting. He gave the film a score of 7.6 out of 10.

International

Ben Croll, in his Screen Daily review, wrote: "Though it packs in a number of hefty plot points alongside weighty ruminations about the lasting effects of childhood abuse and the quiet complicity in which it thrives, Shmila’s debut feature remains surprisingly light on its feet, confronting these difficult questions with wryness, subtlety, and a slightly arch tone that helps the whole thing pass like a breeze." Shikar Verma found Shmila's direction "assured and proactive", and wrote that Montana is a "well made coming of age film that questions choices that can trigger & change lives while one takes a single drag of a cigarette. It deepens the belief that morality & relationships are always on a similar pedestal, and that choosing to take sides depends on what the past has taught us about the world we live in."

Nick Allen, writing for Roger Ebert film review, called Montana "a strong debut" for Limor Shmila, and said of Noa Biron that she gave a "steely, fascinating performance". AfterEllen reviewer Karen Frost wrote that "‘Montana’ is another example of a well-done, interesting, low-key approach to storytelling that also has a lesbian component. It's a solid feature film debut by Limor Shmila that's worth a watch for viewers who like subtle films with a message." David Nusair, for Reel Film Reviews, found Shmila's direction "solid" but thought the relationship between the two women was "unconvincing'. He gave it two-and-a-half out of four stars.

== Awards ==
Year	Nominated work	Category	Result	Notes
2017	Netta Shpigelman	Awards of the Israeli Film Academy (Ophir), Best Supporting Actress	Nominated	
2017	Limor Shmila	Awards of the Israeli Film Academy (Ophir), Best Casting	Nominated	
2017	Noa Biron	Haifa International Film Festival, Best Actress	Won	
2018	Montana / Limor Shmila	Netia Off Camera International Festival of Independent Cinema, Best Feature Film	Nominated	

== See also ==
- List of LGBT-related films directed by women
