= Codependent Lesbian Space Alien Seeks Same =

- Film poster
- Directed by: Madeleine Olnek
- Written by: Madeleine Olnek
- Produced by: Madeleine Olnek; Laura Terruso; Melissa Finell; Lucy Sexton; Cynthia Fredette
- Starring: Lisa Haas; Susan Ziegler; Jackie Monahan; Cynthia Kaplan
- Release date: January 24, 2011 (Sundance)
- Country: United States
- Language: English

Codependent Lesbian Space Alien Seeks Same is an American independent 2011 comedy film written and directed by Madeleine Olnek. It parodies lesbian culture and low-budget American 1950s science-fiction films in the style of Ed Wood.

== Plot ==
Three lesbian space aliens come to Earth, and one of the aliens, Zoinx, falls in love with an employee at a greeting card store named Jane. Jane shyly returns Zoinx's affection and they begin a romance, though Jane does not know that Zoinx is a space alien. In the meantime, Jane, Zoinx, and Zoinx's friends do not know that they may be in trouble: there are two government agents—men in black—monitoring Jane as she starts to become closer to a woman who the men feel does not belong on this planet.

== Cast ==
- Lisa Haas as Jane
- Susan Ziegler as Zoinx
- Jackie Monahan as Zylar
- Cynthia Kaplan as Barr
- Dennis Davis as Senior Agent
- Alex Karpovsky as Rookie Agent
- Rae C. Wright as Jane's Therapist
- Clay Drinko as Alien News Anchor

== Production ==
The film is an adaptation of a play Madeleine Olnek originally wrote and directed for New York's WOW Café theater in 1992, which was also produced in San Francisco in 1999.

== Reception and Reviews ==
The film premiered at the 2011 Sundance Film Festival. As of June 2020, the film holds a 93% approval rating on Rotten Tomatoes, based on 14 reviews with an average rating of 6.2 out of 10. It was nominated in the category of Best Film Not Playing at a Theater Near You at the 2011 Gotham Independent Film Awards.

The film received an enthusiastic critical response, indieWIRE wrote, “the hilarious black-and-white sci-fi romantic comedy “Codependent…” charmed the pants off critics and audiences at the Sundance Film Festival where it world premiered. The film's since gone on to slay at a slew of festivals” Variety concurred saying, “Sweet, funny, clever comedy...Olnek’s sensibility is singular, and the work of the cast-- notably the sweetfaced Haas and the hilariously robotic Ziegler-- make for a movie that seeks, and earns, affection.” During the film's theatrical run, The New York Times emphasized the universality of the comedy. “Clever…witty...this enormously likable movie keeps sexual politics on the back burner and the universal search for connection front and center...Ed Wood would be proud.” And the LA Times said, “'Codependent...' is silly, cheesy and surprisingly enjoyable. As goofy and singular as its look-twice title..." The Hollywood Reporter also opined on the universality of the film, calling it, “A hilarious date movie for couples of all orientations.” And the popular radio program/NPR affiliate, KPCC Film Week, enthused, “Really, really sweet and funny…hysterical…I watched it twice.”

The film won a special award at OutFest in Los Angeles. It was named by Autostraddle as one of the "Top 14 Heterophobic Movies of all Time."

== See also ==
- List of LGBT-related films directed by women
