= Marta Balletbò-Coll =

Spanish film producer and screenwriter (born 1960)

- Born: 1960 (age 65–66); L'Hospitalet de Llobregat, Catalonia
- Occupations: Film actress, director, producer, screenwriter, cinematographer

Marta Balletbò-Coll (born 1960, L'Hospitalet de Llobregat) is a Catalan actress, film director, producer, screenwriter and cinematographer.

== Biography ==
Balletbò-Coll earned a degree in analytical chemistry from the Faculty of Chemistry of the University of Barcelona, and later worked as a journalist from 1982 to 1986. She subsequently worked as a translator in the United States, where she earned a Master's degree in cinematography from Columbia University in New York City on a Fulbright-LaCaixa scholarship.

== Cinematographic career ==
After Balletbò-Coll worked in multiple American advertising agencies, she founded Costabrava Films with Ana Simón Cerezo, with their first movie, Costa Brava, being released in 1995, which was very successful at Frameline Film Festival.

In 2006, she was awarded with the National Film Award of Catalonia, granted by the Generalitat de Catalunya for the production of her film Sévigné. The film also won the grand prix of the Créteil International Women's Film Festival in 2006.

=== Filmography ===
- 2004: Sévigné
- 1998: Cariño, he enviado los hombres a la luna!
- 1995: Costa Brava
- 1992: Intrepidíssima (short film)
- 1991: Harlequin Exterminator (short film)

=== Awards ===
Butaca Awards

Year	Category	Movie	Result
2005	Best Catalan Movie	Sévigné	Won
2003	Best Catalan Actress	Sévigné	Nominated

Paris Lesbian and Feminist Film Festival

Year	Category	Movie	Result
2006	Best Feature Film	Sévigné	Won
1996	Best Feature Film	Costa Brava	Won
