= Angelina Maccarone =

German film director and writer

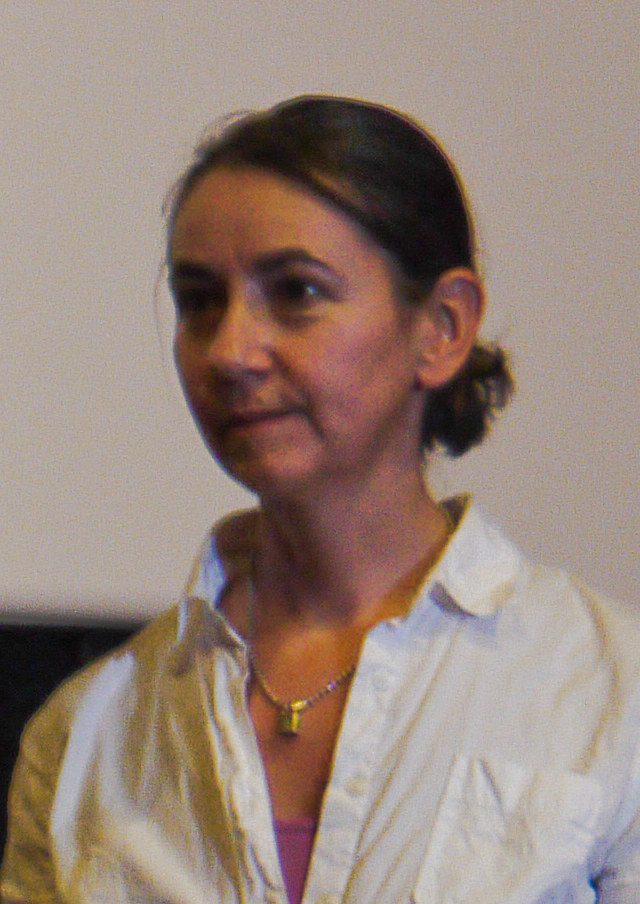
Angelina Maccarone (2011)

Angelina Maccarone is a German film director and writer. She has been writing screenplays since 1992.

== Personal life ==
Angelina Maccarone was born in Pulheim, Germany, 1965. A child of immigration, she is the daughter of an Italian father - who was also a guest worker - and a German mother who together moved to Germany in the 1960s. Maccarone originally sought a career in music before turning to film. She played the electric guitar and became a lyricist when she was 14 years old. In 1985, she attended the University of Hamburg and majored in German and American Studies. Maccarone currently lives in Berlin with her partner, film editor Bettina Böhler.

== Career ==
Maccarone has been writing screenplays since 1992. In that same year, she wrote a screenplay treatment that won the award of the Hamburg Department of Culture, which marked the beginning of her career in film-making. In 1995, Maccarone wrote the final screenplay for a movie with the same name as the treatment, which turned out to be the coming-out comedy Is Mausi Coming Out? With this film, she made her directorial debut and was nominated for the Telestar award. She then made another film in 1998 titled Everything Will Be Fine (Alles wird gut), which also won an award, as it was the winner of Audience Awards in multiple cities, such as Los Angeles and Toronto. In 2005, Maccarone's feature-film Fremde Haut was released. It is about a gay Muslim woman fleeing from Iran to seek asylum in Germany, and it takes on topics regarding unclear and changing representations of identity as a lesbian Muslim woman. Filmed during the New Queer Cinema movement, Fremde Haut is also noted for its few moments of briefly portraying a lesbian relationship as powerful and free.; It proceeded to win the Jury Grand Prize at the International LGBT Festival in Montreal and the Jury Award for Best Narrative Feature at the Seattle L & G Film Festival.

The next year, Maccarone directed and released Verfolgt, which was finished in Hamburg. Prior to its release, she stated "This will be a scandal." This is most likely due to the controversial plot, where a middle-aged female probation officer is seduced by a 17-year-old male teen in her charge. In 2011, Maccarone wrote and directed a documentary known as Charlotte Rampling: The Look. It tells the British actress' life story as it is revealed through a series of conversations that uncover details about Rampling's career and personal thoughts on life. It was presented at the annual Cannes Film Festival in 2011.

== Filmography ==
- Is Mausi Coming Out?, 1995
- Everything Will Be Fine, 1998
- An Angel's Revenge, 1998
- Fremde Haut (Unveiled), 2005
- Verfolgt (Hounded), 2006
- Tatort: Wem Ehre gebührt, 2007
- Vivere, 2007
- Ein Mann, ein Fjord!, 2009
- The Look, 2011
- Polizeiruf 110: Hexenjagd, 2014

== Awards and nominations ==
- 1992: Screenplay Treatment Award of the Hamburg Department of Culture - Is Mausi Coming Out?
- 1995: Nominated for the Telestar Award - Is Mausi Coming Out?
- 1997: Audience Awards in New York, Toronto, Los Angeles, Paris - Everything Will Be Fine
- 1998: Honored at the Cologne Conference - An Angel's Revenge
- 2005: Hessian film award as "Best feature film" - Fremde Haut
- 2005: Jury Grand Prize at the International LGBT Festival in Montreal - Fremde Haut
- 2005: Jury Award for Best Narrative Feature at the Seattle L & G Film Festival - Fremde Haut
- 2006: Golden Leopard at the Locarno Film Festival - Verfolgt
- 2006: Best Feature Film at the Paris Lesbian and Feminist Film Festival - Fremde Haut
- 2007: Nominated for Best Narrative Feature at Tribeca Film Festival - Vivere
- 2012: Nominated for Best Documentary at German Film Awards - The Look

== Charlotte Rampling: The Look (2011) ==
Charlotte Rampling: The Look is a 2011 documentary film about the life of English actress, model, and singer Charlotte Rampling. The film delves into the life work of Rampling, who explains in an interview the difficulty of having to perform in films directed completely in languages other than English. Specifically, she notes how performing in various movies in France have allowed her to become completely fluent in French.

Maccarone describes her desire for creating the documentary in an interview with Film Makers Live after submitting the film to the Cannes Film Festival in 2011. She states her passion and respect for Rampling, noting that the film was created "as a gift" and that she wished to look more in depth at how she worked, and her types of work she produced. She also notes that the film was an ode to Rampling's courage, and wanted to use the film to get to know her better.

== See also ==
- List of female film and television directors
- List of lesbian filmmakers
- List of LGBT-related films directed by women
