= Ava's Impossible Things =

2016 American romance-drama film by Marina Rice Bader

- Directed by: Marina Rice Bader
- Written by: Marina Rice Bader
- Produced by: Marina Rice Bader
- Starring: Chloe Farnworth; Susan Duerden; Abigail Titmuss
- Cinematography: Jih-E Peng
- Edited by: Varun Viswanath
- Music by: Allyson Newman; Storm Greenwood; (original song; 'Here I Am')
- Production company: Soul Kiss Films
- Distributed by: Vimeo
- Release date: July 16, 2016
- Running time: 80 minutes
- Country: United States
- Language: English

Ava's Impossible Things is a 2016 American romance drama film written, produced and directed by Marina Rice Bader. It stars Chloe Farnworth, Susan Duerden, Abigail Titmuss, Lauryn Nicole Hamilton and Marc Hawes. The film had its premiere screening at the 2016 Outfest Los Angeles LGBT Film Festival on July 16, 2016, and was then made available on Vimeo as part of their 'Share the Screen' initiative.

== Plot ==
Ava and her mother Faye both have a pernicious disease that will one day take their lives. They are also mutually joined by an unconditional love for one another, a passion for the arts, and a belief that magic does exist. Ava moved back into her mother's house three years ago to care for her, and ever since then, she has witnessed the deterioration of her mother's health and all she can really do is try to keep her mother from becoming depressed and devitalized. But one day, Faye makes a shocking announcement that propels Ava into a tailspin. When rare guests start to arrive and unexpected events start to happen, Ava is unable to deal with reality. She cries herself to sleep in her mother's arms and escapes to a dream world filled with old friends and long forgotten desires.

== Cast ==
- Chloe Farnworth as Ava
- Susan Duerden as Faye / Claire
- Abigail Titmuss as Anna / Freya
- Lauryn Nicole Hamilton as Jessa / Emma
- Marc Hawes as Sweet P
- Jesselynn Desmond as Leslie / Lumi
- Gabrielle Stone as Depression
- Alexandra Weaver as Acceptance
- Jean Nadine as Bargaining
- Darcie Odom as Anger

== Production notes ==
Vimeo acquired Marina Rice Bader's film as part of their effort for a more gender-inclusive film program. Vimeo's 'Share the Screen' initiative is designed to try and close the immense gender gap in the entertainment industry by promoting films, workshops and interviews that provide a strong female voice. This is Rice Bader's fifth film by her production company Soul Kiss Films, which aims to make movies by women and for women. The movie premiered at the 2016 Outfest Los Angeles LGBT Film Festival, and the film was then made available on Vimeo On Demand the day after the festival

== See also ==
- List of LGBT-related films directed by women
