= Michael Allen Harrison =

American singer

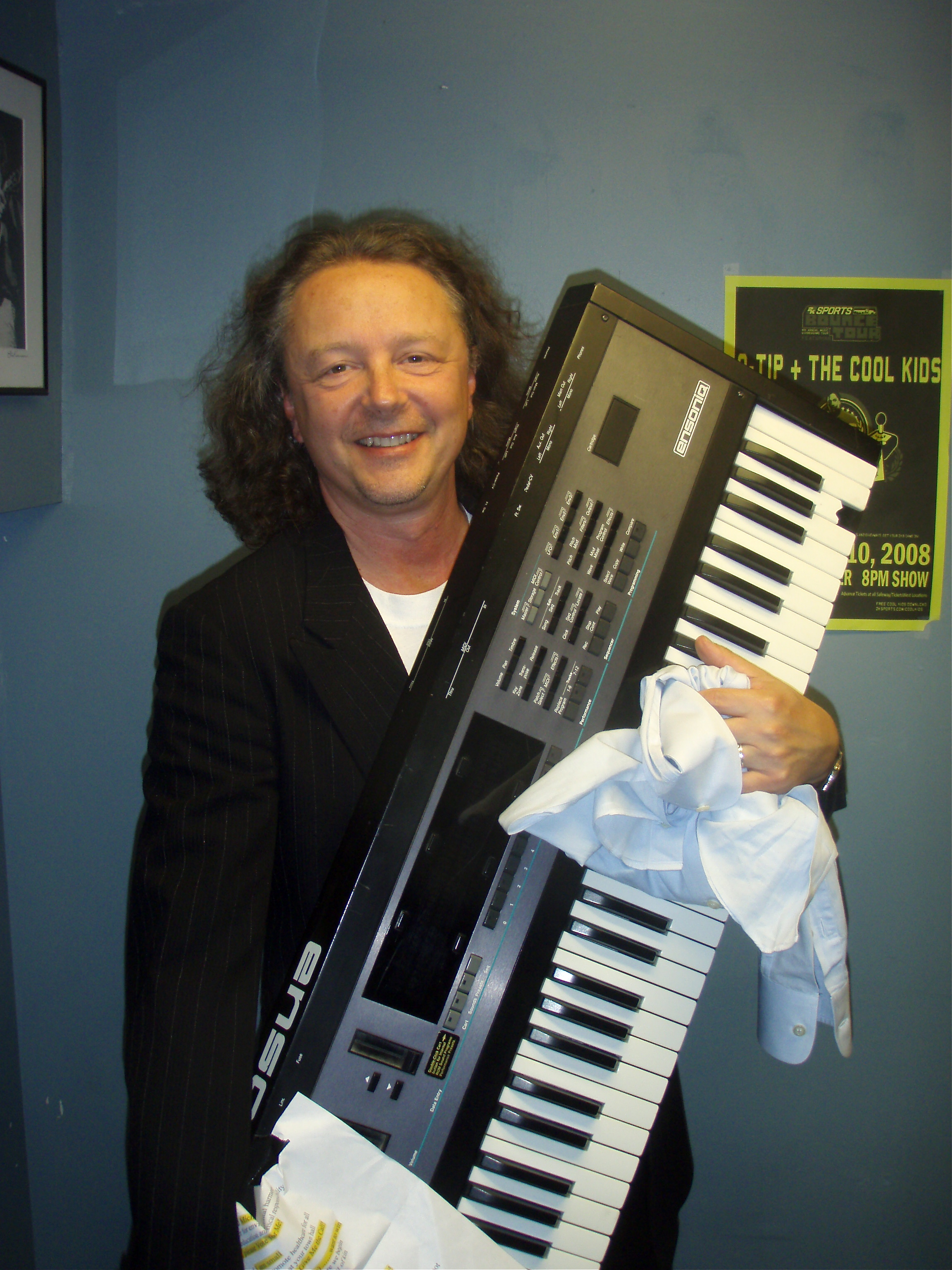
- Harrison in 2008

Background information
- Born: Portland, Oregon; United States
- Genres: New-age
- Occupations: Musician, songwriter
- Instruments: Piano, Keyboards
- Years active: 1986 – current
- Label: MAH records
- Website: Official website

Michael Allen Harrison is an American new-age musician, songwriter and pianist from Portland, Oregon.

== Early years ==
Harrison started playing the piano at age six. He was prompted by his mother, who thought that playing the piano would help him to overcome his shyness. Harrison attended Parkrose High School in northeast Portland.

== Performance & production history ==
Harrison co-wrote the music for the musical Prometheus, which was premiered in Portland, Oregon. Harrison also co-created the musical Soul Harmony. He worked as musical director on film Claire of the Moon.
