= Everything Will Be Fine (1998 film) =

1998 television film directed by Angelina Maccarone

Everything Will Be Fine (German: Alles wird gut) is a German comedy film written by Angelina Maccarone and Fatima El-Tayeb, released in 1998. Everything Will Be Fine was one of the first German films since Toxi with a Black German female protagonist. Additionally, it was the first German comedy with a non-white protagonist. The film aired on German TV and brought novelty to German film through its use of comedy to highlight racism. Maccarone drew from screwball comedy of the 1930s and took it back, made it witty, and “queered” it. Additionally, Everything Will Be Fine moved away from a “problem film”, one that accentuates strangeness, to a film that highlights black female protagonists who are self-sufficient and free. The film highlights different ways of being Black, Queer, and German, The black characters were not depicted as strangers or problems for the German nation through Maccarone's ability to show the “everydayness” of black Germans. This is in stark contrast to Toxi, a 1952 German film, that highlights Toxi, a young black German girl, as a problem.

== Cast ==
- Kati Luzie Stüdemann as Nabou
- Chantal de Freitas as Kim
- Isabella Parkinson as Giuseppa
- Pierre Sanoussi-Bliss as Kofi
- Aglaia Szyszkowitz as Katja
- Uwe Rohde as Dieter

== Reception ==
The film won the Best Feature Film Award at the 1998 Paris Lesbian and Feminist Film Festival, and the Audience Award at the 1998 Inside Out Film and Video Festival.
