= Madeleine Olnek =

Director and playwright

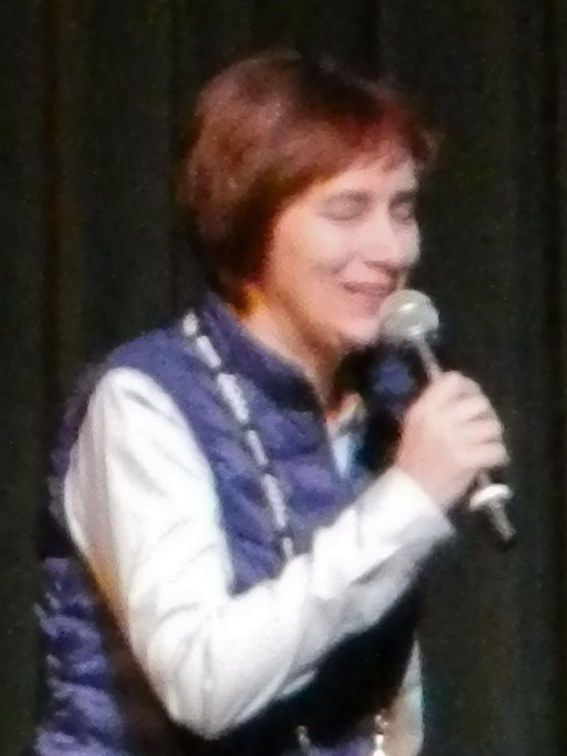
- Olnek in 2014
- Born: New York City, New York, U.S.
- Education: NYU (BFA); Brown University (MFA); Columbia University (MFA)
- Occupations: Film director; screenwriter; playwright

Madeleine Olnek is an American independent film director, producer, screenwriter, and playwright. She has written 24 plays and three feature films, including Codependent Lesbian Space Alien Seeks Same, The Foxy Merkins, and Wild Nights with Emily. Her feature films have been described as "madcap comedies with absurdist leanings" and are all centered around LGBTQ characters.

== Biography ==
Olnek was raised in Greenwich, Connecticut. She studied drama at NYU and graduated in 1987, she received fellowships for an MFA in creative writing from Brown University, and the William Goldman Screenwriting Fellowship for an MFA in film from Columbia University. She became a member of the advocacy group ACT UP in the early 90's.

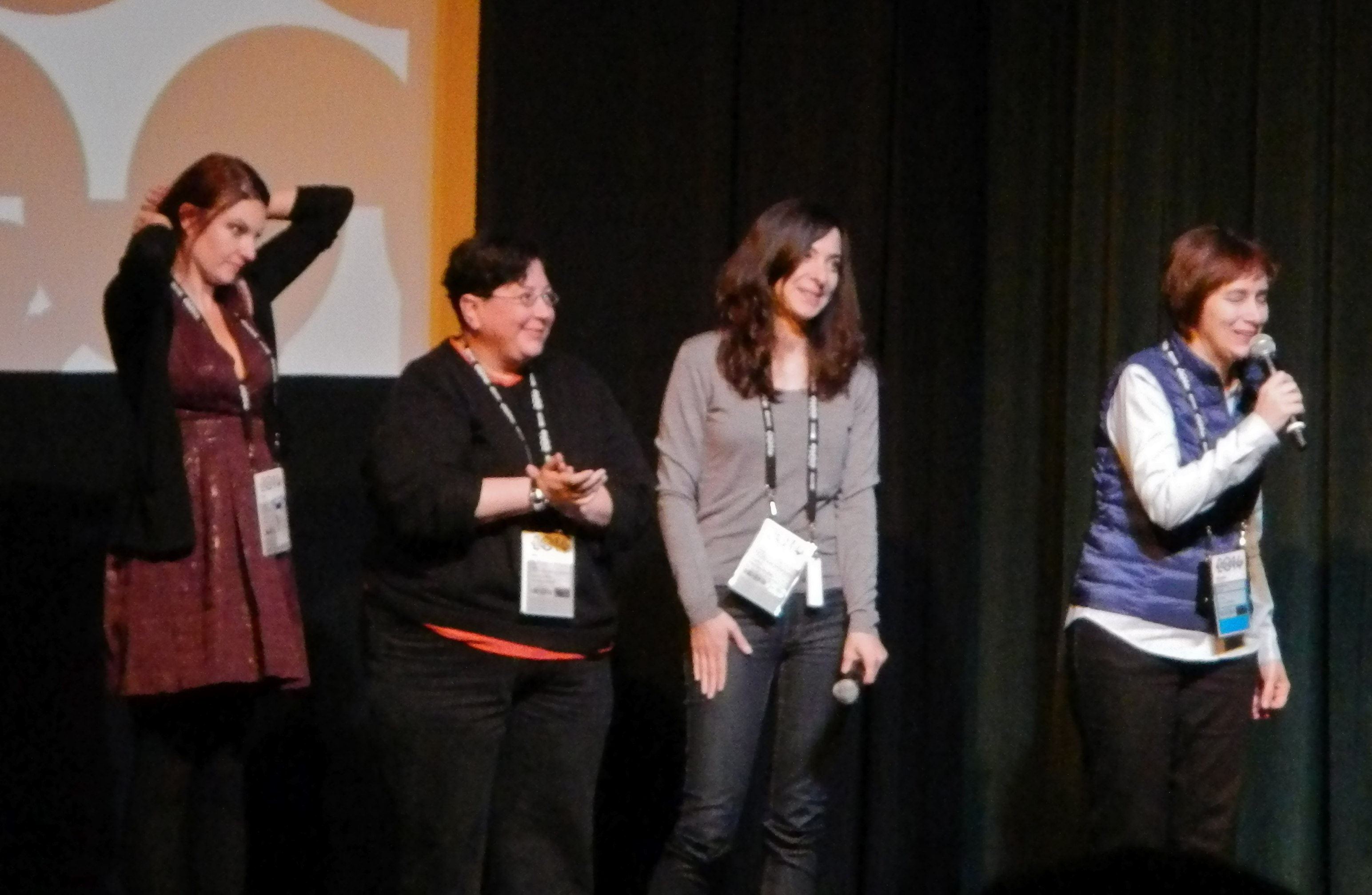
Olnek (right) with the cast of The Foxy Merkins at its Sundance Premiere in 2014

During her time at NYU, Olnek directed a comedy show called "The Follies" in which cast member and NYU classmate Molly Shannon created the basis for her Catholic schoolgirl persona, Mary Katherine Gallagher. Shannon credits Olnek with being "the midwife" to her signature sketch comedy character. After graduating from NYU, Olnek was a downtown New York City playwright and director. She belonged to the Emerging Writers Group at New York's Public Theater and worked with the WOW Café theater in New York where she wrote and directed many plays including, Wild Nights with Emily (1999) and Codependent Lesbian Space Alien Seeks Same (1992). Olnek began to realize that technological advances in the film industry were making it "the place of immediacy", so she began to focus on filmmaking. She made her first short film Hold Up in 2006 and another Countertransference in 2009, both of which screened at the Sundance Film Festival. Countertransference was awarded "Best Short Film Directed by a woman at Sundance" by Women in Film Los Angeles.

In 2011, Olnek adapted one of her plays into her first feature film Codependent Lesbian Space Alien Seeks Same, which played at Sundance, MoMA, and The Viennale, and was nominated for the 2011 Gotham Independent Film Awards. Her second feature film The Foxy Merkins, which also included some of the actors from Codependent, played at Sundance, The Moscow International Film Festival, and BAMcinemaFest. It was nominated for an Independent Spirit Award. Olnek received research grants from Harvard University Press and the Guggenheim Foundation to adapt another of her plays into her third feature, Wild Nights with Emily. The film was the first ever on-screen portrayal of a queer Emily Dickinson. It starred Molly Shannon, premiered in 2018 at SXSW, and was nominated for the John Cassavetes Independent Spirit Award. The Rotten Tomatoes editorial staff ranked it in the top ten of "The Best Comedies of 2019."

== Personal life ==
Madeleine Olnek considers herself a "lady homosexual" and lives in New York City. She likes to tell jokes.

== Filmography ==
Year	Film	Type	Credit
2006	Hold Up	Short film	Director
2006	Make Room for Phyllis	Short film	Director
2009	Countertransference	Short film	Director, Producer
2011	Codependent Lesbian Space Alien Seeks Same	Feature film	Director, Writer, Producer
2013	The Foxy Merkins	Feature film	Director, Co-writer, Producer
2018	Wild Nights with Emily	Feature film	Director, Writer, Producer

== Bibliography ==
=== Selected plays ===
- Fan Mail (1987), co-written with Nancy Swartz
- Case Studies (1988), co-written with Dominique Dibbell and Nancy Swartz
- Double Awareness, Double Awareness (1991)
- Spookyworld (1992)
- Codependent Lesbian Space Alien Seeks Same (1992)
- The I'm Not Welcome Anywhere Christmas Special
- The Jewish Nun (1992)
- It's Not the Shoes (1992), an adaptation of The Twelve Dancing Princesses by Hans Christian Andersen for the Alternate Visions Theater Troupe of Youth Enrichment Services at the LGBT Center
- Disaster Area Nurse (1993)
- Destiny of Mimi (1994)
- How To Write While You Sleep (1998)
- Wild Nights with Emily (1999)
- Gay! Gay! Gay! (1999)

=== Textbooks ===
- A Practical Handbook for the Actor by Melissa Bruder, Lee Michael Cohn, Madeleine Olnek, Nathaniel Pollack, Robert Previtio, Scott Zigler, and David Mamet

== See also ==
- List of female film and television directors
- List of lesbian filmmakers
- List of LGBTQ-related films directed by women
