= Skyler Cooper =

American actor

Skyler Cooper is an American actor and activist. Cooper is known for playing both male and female roles. Cooper stated that after being gender neutral for most of his life, "As I launch my website as a transgender person, I identify as 'He' and with masculine pronouns."

== Education ==
Cooper was mentored by acting coach Phil Bennett. He also went to his Theatre Labs to learn contemporary theater.

== Career ==
An acting coach once told Cooper he would need to stay in the closet for the sake of his career. He switched coaches and subsequently had success performing in queer specific film and theatre. He first performed on stage with the 2000 production of Liquid Fire. Then, in 2003 he starred in the documentary, Butch Mystique. In 2012, he wrote, directed, produced and acted in the short film Hero Mars (2013 release).

Cooper starred in the short film Frederica, as well as Hooters, a documentary about the making of The Owls.Cooper appeared in the “Lesbians Gone Wild” episode of RuPaul’s Drag U in 2011. Cooper was also featured in movies including Cheryl Dunye’s The Owls, Insomniacs and Elena Undone. On stage, Cooper was cast as Othello in the Impact Theatre's Performance of Othello Staged Reading (which purposefully subverted gender and race dynamics by casting a Black queer actor).

In 2018, he played the role of Trish in Lasso.

=== Hero Mars ===
Hero Mars won the 2014 Best Short Film at the Bronze Lens Film Festival.

== Personal life ==
Cooper has a bodybuilding background and is described as muscular. He has done work at Gold's Gym as a personal trainer. He was a fitness coordinator in the military. Cooper is originally from New York. His father is a Baptist minister.

== See also ==
- List of transgender film and television directors
