= Zero Chou =

Taiwanese director and screenwriter

- Born: 24 July 1969 (age 56); Keelung, Taiwan
- Awards: Teddy Award for Best Feature Film; 2007 Spider Lilies

Chinese name
- Traditional Chinese: 周美玲
Transcriptions

Zero Chou (Chinese: 周美玲; pinyin: Zhōu Měilíng; born 24 July 1969) is a Taiwanese director and screenwriter.

== Life and career ==
Chou was born in Keelung, Taiwan in 1969. She earned a B.A. in Philosophy from National Chengchi University in 1992. She worked as a journalist before becoming an indie film director.

She entered film making because of her attraction to the content and art form. She has been considered as one of the most talented documentary director in recent years inTaiwan. She received a Teddy Award for Best Feature Film in 2007 for the movie Spider Lillies.

Chou and Hoho Liu (Chinese: 劉芸后) are an openly lesbian couple. Chou "is one of the few openly lesbian filmmakers in the world, and the only one in Taiwan," according to AfterEllen. She is currently filming a six-film series called the Six Asian Cities Rainbow Project (亞洲六城彩虹計劃). She is trying to finish as quickly as possible and worries she will go missing while filming, since many of the locations have rules against films presenting LGBT content.

== Works ==
=== Documentary ===
- Looking for the Forgotten Artists (Chinese: 走找布袋戲的老藝師) 1997, 45 mins
- Artist and His Daughter (Chinese: 藝術家和他的女兒) 1997, 23 mins
- Memories of the Taiwanese Master (Chinese: 師影) 1997, 47 mins
- Yi Shi Zai Hai Xia Zhong (Lost in the Strait) (Chinese: 遺失在海峽中：烏坵) 1998, 48 mins
- Being Ceased (Chinese: 斷曲：走尋布袋戲後場的老樂師) 1998, 60 mins
- Mother and Son (Chinese: 媽媽遺失與撿到的孩子) 1998, 65 mins
- Democracy Show (Chinese: 民主的頭人：政治秀) 1998, 53 mins
- Wanderers' Bay (Chinese: 飄泊的港灣：百年基隆港)) 1998, 60 mins
- Floating Islands (Chinese: 流離島影) 2000, 288 mins
- Before the Radiation (Chinese: 輻射將至) 2000, 22 mins
- Headhunting Festival (Chinese: 人頭祭的故事) 2000, 54 mins
- Zou Zu Zhan Ji (Chinese: 鄒族戰祭) 2000, 56 mins
- Corners (Chinese: 私角落) 2001, 66 mins
- Poles Extremity (Chinese: 極端寶島) 2002, 56 mins
- The Kinmenese Tracks (Chinese: 火車在海邊游) 2003, 64 mins
- Father in the Blacklist (Chinese: 黑名單爸爸) 2004, 56 mins

=== Film ===
- A Film About the Body (Chinese: 身體影片) 1996, 62 mins
- Splendid Float (Chinese: 艷光四射歌舞團) 2004, 71 mins
- The Road on the Air (Chinese: 單車上路) 2006, 82 mins
- Spider Lilies (Chinese: 刺青) 2007, 97 mins (Teddy Award, 2007)
- Drifting Flowers (Chinese: 漂浪青春) 2008, 97 mins
- Wave Breaker 2009, 86 mins
- Ripples of Desire (Chinese: 花漾) 2012, 110 mins
- The Substitute (Chinese: 替身) 2017
- We are Gamily (Chinese: 偽婚男女) 2017
- Wrath of Desire (Chinese: 愛・殺) 2020
- Untold Herstory (Chinese: 流麻溝十五號) 2022

=== Television ===
- The Rise and Fall of Qing Dynasty (滿清十三皇朝) 1987
- Gloomy Salad Days (死神少女) 2010
- Because of You (因為愛你) 2020

== Awards ==
Corners

- Winner of the 2002 Taipei Film Festival for Best Documentary

Poles Extremity

- Winner of the 2003 Marseille Festival of Documentary Film for Best Documentary

Splendid Float

- Winner of the 2004 Golden Horse Award for Best Make Up and Costume Design
- Winner of the 2004 Golden Horse Award for Best Original Film Song
- Winner of the 2004 Golden Horse Award for Best Taiwanese Film Of The Year
- Winner of the 1st CJ Asia Independent Film Festival for Audience Award

Spider Lilies

- Winner of the 2007 Teddy Award for Best Gay/Lesbian Feature Film at the Berlin Film Festival

== See also ==
- List of female film and television directors
- List of LGBT films directed by women
- List of lesbian filmmakers
