= Claire of the Moon =

1992 film by Nicole Conn

- Directed by: Nicole Conn
- Written by: Nicole Conn
- Produced by: Pamela S. Kuri; Nicole Conn
- Starring: Trisha Todd; Karen Trumbo
- Cinematography: Randolph Sellars
- Edited by: Michael Solinger
- Music by: Michael Allen Harrison
- Distributed by: Demi-Monde Productions
- Release date: 1992
- Running time: 105 minutes
- Country: United States
- Language: English

Claire of the Moon is a 1992 lesbian-themed erotic drama film directed by Nicole Conn and starring Trisha Todd and Karen Trumbo.

== Plot ==
Claire of the Moon is set in the 1990s in the Pacific Northwest. Claire Jabrowski (Todd), a famous heterosexual author, decides to attend a retreat for all-female writers. Claire's roommate at the retreat is Dr. Noel Benedict, author of a book called The Naked Truth. The movie culminates in a sexual encounter between the two authors.

== Synopsis ==
Claire Jabrowski (Trisha Todd) is a famous writer who has just broken up with her boyfriend and is stricken with a mild case of writer's block. She drives from her home in Los Angeles to coastal Oregon where she has signed herself up to attend the all-women's Arcadia Writers Retreat. After arriving, Claire is assigned to share a cabin with psychiatrist Dr. Noel Benedict (Karen Trumbo), the author of a sex therapy book titled The Naked Truth who is attending the retreat to find inspiration for her next book. Claire and Noel do not get along with each other, for Noel is uptight and annoyed by Claire's disorderly habits involving writing and fashion sense.

Claire, Noel and the other writers attend weekly group meetings to discuss their work and gender politics, moderated by Maggie (Faith McDevitt). At one meeting, Noel comes out to the group by admitting that she is a lesbian, which disturbs the group's brash, Southern-accented romance novelist Tara O'Hara (Caren Graham). Noel later complains to Maggie about Claire and her habits, but Maggie insists that Claire will help Noel loosen up.

Bored with the retreat, Claire drives to nearby Portland one evening where she meets and seduces a man named Brian (Damon Craig) that she meets at a local bar. The next morning, Noel proposes they establish a set of house rules, but Claire's messiness continues to irritate her.

One night at the bar, Noel feels alienated as Tara and the other heterosexual women discuss penis size. When Brian approaches their table to say hello to Claire, Noel abruptly leaves. Sometime later, Claire is disturbed by a dream about kissing Noel, and she resumes her relationship with Brian. Another evening or two later at the bar, Noel and Claire get into a debate about intimacy between men and women. Noel buys Claire a drink to apologize for their disagreements. Claire questions Noel about the logistics of lesbian sexual intercourse, claiming she has an "academic" interest in the subject.

One evening at the cabin, Claire claims she is bored and suggests she and Noel play backgammon and drink tequila. When Claire loses the game, she agrees to impart the details of a sexual fantasy. Noel counters with her personal story, but begins to imagine Claire as her sexual partner. Claire's bond with Noel continues to deepen, despite Claire continuing to maintain that she is straight, and she becomes confused to why she is attracted to Noel.

One night, the writers group all get drunk and have a dance party, and Claire pulls Noel into a close embrace. Just as they are about to kiss, one of the other women bursts into tears over her recent fallout with her husband. Claire and Noel return to their cabin intoxicated, and Claire suggests they have sex. Noel refuses to get involved with a straight woman, thinking that Claire's attraction to her stems from curiosity. Claire backs down and insists she is simply afraid to act on impulse.

The next day, Noel reads Claire's latest novel and Claire goes for a jog on the beach, falling to her knees in distress. Later, the women meet while walking through the sand. They kiss, then return to their cabin where they finally make love for the first time.

== Cast ==
- Trisha Todd as Claire Jabrowski
- Karen Trumbo as Dr. Noel Benedict
- Faith McDevitt as Maggie
- Craig Damon (credited as Damon Craig) as Brian
- Caren Graham as Tara O'Hara
- Sheila Dickenson (credited as Sheila Dickinson) as B.J.
- Patricia Blem as Arrow
- Melissa Mitchell as Adrienne King
- Gathering Marbet as Amy
- Sherilyn Lawson as Lynn Schroeder
- Doug Rouhier as Mr. 501
- Misty Cooper as Noel's Fantasy Woman

== Reception ==
The film received solid reviews from the Los Angeles Reader and was successful in Los Angeles, Seattle, Chicago, Portland and the entire Bay Area with the exception of San Francisco. However, lesbian critics gave the film poor reviews. Conn described Claire "...as a social phenomenon in the sense that it divided and explored the vast differences between the political dyke and Jane Q. Lesbo."

== See also ==
- List of LGBT films directed by women
