= Walk with Me (2021 film) =

2021 film directed by Isabel del Rosal

- Directed by: Isabel De Rosal
- Starring: Devin Dunne Cannon Bridget Barkan Daniel Fox Catrina Ganey Nikki James Malachy Cleary Kristen Vaughan Grant Elisa Ginsberg
- Release date: March 22, 2021
- Country: United States
- Language: English

Walk with Me is a 2021 American independent romantic drama film written and directed by Isabel del Rosal. Devin Dunne Cannon stars as a 30-year-old mother who leaves her husband, then unexpectedly falls in love with another woman, played by Bridget Barkan.

== Plot ==
At the age of 30 and with a young daughter, Amber Evans is forced to start over after she builds up the courage to leave her husband and the only life she’s ever known. As she struggles to find her way, she meets Logan, a free spirited musician with a kind heart who lends an ear to Amber's situation. What starts out as a close friendship however, quickly evolves into an unexpected romance. Now, Amber must come to terms with this new identity, amidst the turmoilof a divorce, before she loses the person that she loves. Will she cave under pressure, or can she overcome her fears before it destroys her relationship?

“Walk With Me” explores what it means to be a woman, a mother, a daughter and a lover, and shows how we embrace and reject who we are, and how we eventually learn to stand tall in our own shoes.

== Cast ==
- Devin Dunne Cannon as Amber Evans
- Bridget Barkan as Logan Pierce, the woman Amber falls in love with
- Daniel Fox as Ethan, Amber's ex-husband
- Catrina Ganey as Sol, Amber's boss and mentor
- Nikki James as Grace, Amber's mother
- Malachy Cleary as Michael, Amber's father
- Kristen Vaughan as Linda Pierce, Logan's mother
- Grant Elisa Ginsberg as Emily, Amber's daughter

== Distribution ==
Walk With Me, had its world premiere at Cinequest film festival in 2021, has screened at 20 festivals worldwide, won the Spirit Award and Best Actor at Brooklyn Film Festival, Best Emerging Director at

Manhattan Film Festival, Best LGBTQ Film at Lady Filmmakers, Best Female Composer at Toronto Int'l Women's Film Festival, Best Feature at New York Int'l Women's Film Festival and was an official

selection at Toronto’s Inside Out Film Festival amongst many other awards and nominations. We were one of two sponsored films at the 2022 BFI Flare in London and recently were awarded Best Soundtrack at Immaginaria International Film Festival in Rome, Italy. Walk With Me has signed with Gravitas Ventures and was released in North America on March 22, 2022 and expanded internationally in english speaking territories in April 2023.

It is available on Amazon, Vudu, Tubi, Vimeo, YouTube, Google Play, Microsoft Xbox, Sling and Video on Demand.

== Reception ==
Writing for Gay Star News, Rafaella Gunz said the film has "relatable characters and a passion that pulls the viewer in." The review website LesFlicks.com called it a "carefully crafted movie" with characters who have "been given meticulous backstory and depth."

== Soundtrack ==
Juno Award-nominated singer-songwriter Amanda Walther of the folk duo Dala wrote sixteen original songs for the film's soundtrack. Walther said, "I learned so much through this process of writing music for this film: to be brave yet patient with myself, focus on what really matters and love every step of life along the way."
