= Spider Lilies (film) =

- Spider Lilies poster

Chinese name
- Traditional Chinese: 刺青
Transcriptions
Standard Mandarin
- Hanyu Pinyin: Cìqīng
- Directed by: Zero Chou
- Written by: Singing Chen
- Produced by: Lin Yun-hou
- Starring: Rainie Yang; Isabella Leong; Ivy Chen; Jay Shih; Kris Shen; Kris Shie
- Cinematography: Hoho Liu
- Edited by: Hsiao Ju-kuan
- Music by: Hwang Chien-hsun; Chang Chien-yu
- Production companies: Third Vision Film Production; Great Domain Production
- Distributed by: Central Motion Pictures Corporation
- Release date: 30 March 2007
- Running time: 94 minutes
- Country: Taiwan
- Languages: Mandarin; Japanese
- Budget: NT$10 million
- Box office: US$693,052

Spider Lilies (Chinese: 刺青; pinyin: Cìqīng; lit. 'Tattoo') is a 2007 Taiwanese drama film. It is the second feature-length film by director Zero Chou, and stars Rainie Yang and Isabella Leong in the lead roles. Spider Lilies was screened at the 2007 Berlin International Film Festival, where it won the Teddy Award for Best LGBT-related Feature Film. It was released in the United States by Wolfe Video on 6 May 2008.

The theme song "Xiao Mo Li" ("小茉莉"), performed by Rainie Yang, received a Golden Horse Award nomination for Best Original Film Song at the 44th Golden Horse Awards.

== Plot ==
Jade is a webcam girl, who broadcasts herself nightly on the internet to anonymous users. She seeks a tattoo, which leads her to the studio of tattoo artist Takeko, who also happens to be Jade's childhood crush. Jade becomes entranced by a large tattoo of golden flowers—spider lilies—on Takeko's arm. She wants the same design, but Takeko refuses, telling her that the flowers are cursed.

Takeko's father, who was killed in an earthquake, had the same tattoo on his arm. Her younger brother Ching witnessed the incident and was traumatised by it, left with no memory except for the image of the flowers. Takeko decided to get the same tattoo, in the hope that it would help her brother's recovery. Nevertheless, Takeko finds herself drawn to Jade, and begins designing a new tattoo for her.

Meanwhile, a young police officer is trying to ambush Jade and the rest of the girls working in the same website. However, he takes to speaking to her, listening to her childhood stories and connecting with her, thereby slowing down the investigation he is supposed to be working on. Eventually he falls in love with her, trying to tell her to get out before it's too late and before she's caught. He blurts out that he loves her, and Jade, mistaking him for Takeko, goes to her.

When one of Takeko's customers gets into a fight and loses his arm, Takeko sends him to the hospital and forgets to pick up her brother. Desperate and frightened, he goes out into the street to look for her, and recovers his memory just before falling down a steep hill.

Takeko finds Ching in the hospital, where he has slipped into a severe coma. Devastated and guilt-stricken, she sends a farewell message to Jade saying that she will not be able to finish Jade's tattoo.

Later, Jade decides to go online and wait for Takeko. At this time, the policeman finally confesses his true identity to Jade and tells her that she must get offline immediately. She cries, realizing it was not Takeko who had confessed love to her earlier.

Eventually, Ching awakes from his coma with his memory intact. Joyful Takeko sends Jade another message apologizing, and saying that she will wait for her in the tattoo shop. The last image of the film is footage of Jade, coming to meet Takeko.

== Cast ==
- Rainie Yang as Jade
- Isabella Leong as Takeko
- Ivy Chen as Zhenzhen
- Jay Shih as A-tung
- Kris Shen as Ching, Takeko's brother
- Kris Shie as David
- Michio Hayashida as Sensei Yoshi
- Pai Chih-ying as Young Jade
- Steven Lin as Young Ching
- Jag Huang as Senior investigator B

== Soundtrack ==
Spider Lilies: Original Motion Picture Soundtrack

Soundtrack album by Various artists
- Released: April 27, 2007
- Genre: Film soundtrack
- Labels: A Good Day Records, Himalaya Records

No.	Title	Performer	Length
1.	"Worried Jasmine 憂茉莉"	Chen Chien-chi	02:07
2.	"Sunrise Jasmine 旭茉莉"	insecteens	02:33
3.	"Tattoo 31 刺青三十一號"	Chen Chien-chi	01:59
4.	"Stone Jasmine 石茉莉"	insecteens	03:58
5.	"Dancing Jasmine 舞茉莉"	insecteens	02:00
6.	"Night Bamboo 竹夜青"	insecteens	05:12
7.	"Tattoo 10 刺青十號"	Chen Chien-chi	02:13
8.	"Quiet Jasmine 幽茉莉"	insecteens	04:14
9.	"Sisters Leaving 姊離症"	insecteens	04:08
10.	"Spider Lilies 蜘蛛莉莉"	insecteens	06:47
11.	"Neglected Lilies 落寞莉"	insecteens	01:55
12.	"Tattoo 5 刺青五號"	Chen Chien-chi	01:01
13.	"Little Jasmine 小茉莉"	Lin Yu-chen	03:24
14.	"Mandala"	Chang Chien-yu	02:13
15.	"Dawn Jasmine 曉茉莉"	insecteens	04:47
16.	"Red Cloud Jasmine 霞茉莉"	insecteens, Chen Chien-chi	04:08
