= Butch Mystique =

2003 documentary film by Debra A Wilson

Butch Mystique is a 2003 documentary directed by Debra A. Wilson. The documentary explores the lives of a group of African American butch identified lesbians within the Oakland/San Francisco Bay area.

== Content ==
The documentary follows nine African American butch identified lesbians: Chris Baldwin, Skyler Cooper, Elyse Duckett, Matu Feliciano, Pippa Fleming, Carol Hill, Kymberly Jackson, Sable McQuarters, and Johnnie Pratt. Within the documentary, the women range in their ages and share various aspects of their personal lives and specifically about their butch lifestyle.

The topics discussed include: their look/gender expression, self acceptance and coming out, childhood, relationships with family members, partners, perceptions of society, and what it means to identify as butch. Because of these women's shared racial identity as African American butch lesbians, the interplay of race, gender, and sexuality is very much relevant to the documentary. The testimonies of these women have been described as raw, powerful, intimate, and ultimately convey the experience of finding and being one's self outside the norm of society.

Wilson suggested that Butch Mystique, “goes beneath the surface, beyond the stereotypes, to reveal the heart of what it means to be an African American butch-identified lesbian.”

== Reception ==
Malinda Lo proclaims that Butch Mystique: “succeeds in presenting an interesting and informative picture of the lives of African American butch lesbians, because the interviews succeed in making each of these women truly human.” Lo critiques that the documentary could have better situated the stories of the women within the relevant historical and geographical context.

== Awards ==
The documentary was awarded the Audience Award for Best Short at the 2003 San Francisco International Gay and Lesbian Film Festival. Also, the documentary won the 2004 Showtime Black Filmmaker Showcase grant.

== See also ==
- African-American LGBT community
