= Julie and Me =

- French: Revoir Julie
- Directed by: Jeanne Crépeau
- Written by: Jeanne Crépeau
- Produced by: Jeanne Crépeau
- Starring: Dominique Leduc; Stephanie Morgenstern
- Cinematography: Stefan Ivanov
- Edited by: Myriam Poirier
- Music by: Karen Young
- Release date: 1998
- Running time: 92 minutes
- Country: Canada
- Language: French

Julie and Me (French: Revoir Julie) is a Canadian lesbian romantic comedy film, directed by Jeanne Crépeau and released in 1998. The film's French title translates literally as "See Julie Again".

== Plot ==
The film takes place mainly over two days. Following a recent break-up, Juliet makes a to-do list, which includes seeing her former friend Julie again for the first time in 15 years.

Juliet tracks Julie down in the Eastern Townships of Quebec. Day 1 sees the pair reconnect as they spend the day together. However, near the end of the night, Juliet kisses Julie. Surprised, despite a similar incident in their adolescence, Julie initially rejects Juliet. However, the next day when Juliet prepares to leave, Julie won't let her go.

Day 2 sees Julie work through her feelings for Juliet. Facing the prospect of losing Juliet again, Julie finally admits to having feelings for Juliet and eventually returns Juliet's affections.

== Cast ==
- Dominique Leduc as Julie
- Stephanie Morgenstern as Juliet
- Lucille Belair as Aunt Maggie
- Muriel Dutil as Julies Mother
- Marcel Sabourin as Mr Provencher
- Marie-Pierre Côté as Young Juliet
- Mariève Deslongchamps as Young Julie

== Awards ==
The film won the Audience Award at the Paris Lesbian Film Festival in 1999.

== See also ==
- List of LGBT films directed by women
