= Justine's Film =

- French: Le film de Justine
- Directed by: Jeanne Crépeau
- Written by: Jeanne Crépeau
- Produced by: Jeanne Crépeau
- Narrated by: Marie-Hélène Montpetit
- Cinematography: Sylvaine Dufaux; Jeanne Crépeau; Yves Bélanger
- Edited by: Richard Comeau
- Music by: Marc Pérusse
- Production company: Les films de l'autre
- Distributed by: Cinéma Libre
- Release date: 1989
- Running time: 46 minutes
- Country: Canada
- Language: French

Justine's Film (French: Le film de Justine) is a Canadian short drama film, directed by Jeanne Crépeau and released in 1989. The film stars Marie-Hélène Montpetit as Justine, a lesbian woman who is coping with the end of her relationship with a woman she loved, but who only saw Justine as a friend rather than a girlfriend.

The cast also includes Paula de Vasconcelos, Danielle Trépanier, Stephanie Morgenstern, Denise Ménard, Roc Lafortune, Léa-Marie Cantin, Stephen Craig, Josée Chaboillez, Charlotte Laurier, Denis Trudel, Ariane Lee, Stéphane Lestage, Gérard Soler, Benoît Pilon, Pol Turgeon, Vratislav Hadrava, Jean Turcotte, Isabelle Guilbault, Carole Faucher. The film is narrated entirely in voice-over, with no dialogue directly spoken by the characters.

The film screened at the 1989 Toronto International Film Festival, where it received an honourable mention from the Best Canadian Short Film award jury, and at the 1990 Yorkton Short Film and Video Festival, where it won awards for Best Experimental Film, Best Director and Best Musical Score.
