= More Beautiful for Having Been Broken =

2019 film by Nicole Conn

- Directed by: Nicole Conn
- Written by: Nicole Conn
- Produced by: Nicole Conn; Lissa Forehan
- Starring: Zoe Ventoura; Kayla Radomski; Cale Ferrin
- Edited by: Nicole Conn; David C. Eichhorn
- Music by: Nami Melumad
- Distributed by: Vision Films
- Release date: June 30, 2019 (Frameline Film Festival)
- Country: United States
- Language: English

More Beautiful for Having Been Broken is a 2019 American drama film directed by Nicole Conn and starring Zoe Ventoura, Kayla Radomski and Cale Ferrin. In the film, a broken female FBI agent, struggling with the loss of her mother, is suspended from her job and travels to the small mountain town in the countryside she used to visit as a child. She befriends a woman and her adorable, young, special needs son who possesses an extraordinary gift. The women's friendship soon turns into romance but family secrets complicate things.

== Plot Summary ==
The film follows a suspended female FBI agent who travels to a small mountain town while grieving the loss of her mother. There, she forms a deep romantic bond with a local woman and her young special-needs son.

== Cast ==
- Zoe Ventoura as Mackenzie De Ridder
- Kayla Radomski as Samantha
- Cale Ferrin as Freddie
- Bruce Davison as Colin
- Kay Lenz as Cassandra
- Gabrielle Christian as Sasha Pinchot
- Gabrielle Baba-Conn as Gabrielle Pinchot
- Felissa Rose as Millicent
- Brooke Elliott as Kat
- French Stewart as Rodney
- Harley Jane Kozak as Vivienne Pinchot
- Wally Kurth as Bud (Singer & Bartender)

== Release ==
The film made its premiere at the Frameline Film Festival on June 30, 2019.

On March 24, 2020, it was announced that Vision Films acquired worldwide distribution rights to the film.

The film was released on DVD by Wolfe Video on April 7, 2020 and on digital platforms on May 8, 2020 in the United States and Canada.

== Accolades ==
At the Los Angeles Independent Film Festival, the film won awards for Best Picture, Best Director, Best Actress (Ventoura) Best Actor (Ferrin) and Best Editing, and Best Original Score.

The film also won the Best Picture awards at the LA Femme Film Festival, the White Light City Film Festival and the International Ind Film Festival.
