= Jeanne Crépeau =

Canadian director and screenwriter

Jeanne Crépeau (born 1961 in Montreal, Quebec) is a Canadian film director and screenwriter from Montreal, Quebec, best known for her film Julie and Me (Revoir Julie).

Trained at the National Film Board of Canada and the Canadian Film Centre, she made a number of short films in the 1980s and early 1990s. Her 1989 short film Justine's Film (Le film de Justine) screened at the 1989 Toronto International Film Festival, where it received an honourable mention from the Best Canadian Short Film award jury, and at the 1990 Yorkton Short Film and Video Festival, where it won awards for Best Experimental Film, Best Director and Best Musical Score. In 1991, she collaborated with the dance troupe Brouhaha Danse on Claire, a video and performance tribute to dancer Claire Samson following her murder in 1990.

She had initially planned to make her debut feature film about an Olympic swimmer, but had difficulty securing funding; after visiting a friend in the Eastern Townships of Quebec, she rewrote the film's script and rented her friend's house for two months to serve as the film's set. Revoir Julie was released in 1998, and won the Audience Award at the Paris Lesbian Film Festival in 1999.

== Films ==
- By Attrition (L'Usure) - 1986
- The Flu (Gerçure) - 1988
- Justine's Film (Le film de Justine) - 1989
- La Tranchée - 1991
- Claire (Claire et l'obscurité) - 1991
- Julie and Me (Revoir Julie) - 1998
- Lonesome Monsieur Turgeon (La solitude de Monsieur Turgeon) - 2001
- La beauté du geste - 2004
- Jouer Ponette - 2007
- Suivre Catherine - 2008
- A Montreal Girl (La fille de Montréal) - 2010

== See also ==
- List of female film and television directors
- List of lesbian filmmakers
- List of LGBT-related films directed by women
