= The Quest for Freedom =

- Directed by: Fred Holmes
- Written by: Fred Holmes
- Produced by: David Hicks; Scott Peck; Greg Vaughn
- Starring: Summer Selby; David King; Reg Grant; Jillian Amburgey
- Cinematography: James W. Wrenn
- Edited by: Fred Holmes
- Release date: 1992
- Country: United States
- Language: English

The Quest for Freedom is a 1992 historical film about abolitionist Harriet Tubman.

== Plot ==
Ben, a rebellious young African American, mysteriously becomes trapped in the past with abolitionist Harriet Tubman. He experiences life with Tubman as a slave on a Maryland plantation. When the master of the plantation dies, Ben and Harriet use the Underground Railroad to gain their freedom and escape Pennsylvania. Ben discovers purpose and courage in his own life upon returning to his own time.

== See also ==
- A Woman Called Moses, 1978 miniseries about Harriet Tubman
- Harriet, 2019 film about Tubman
- List of films featuring slavery
