= Cineffable =

French lesbian film organization

Cineffable is a French organization whose purpose is to promote lesbian cinema, especially through the International Lesbian and Feminist Film Festival in Paris: When lesbians make movies.

The association was born in 1989 out of the lack of sufficient spaces reserved for female homosexuality in the International Women's Film Festival of Créteil. Cineffable's goal is to organize a lesbian film festival for lesbians.

== Paris International Film Festival : When Lesbians Make Movies ==
=== Organisation ===
This film festival, has been created for an exclusively female audience. Historically it has given rise to debates and meetings between participants and is a hotbed of discussion on lesbianism and feminism.

The association Cineffable is self-managed and the festival is financially independent, being self-financed since 2003. However the association receives a grant from the city of Paris under the Observatory of equality between men and women of the Paris City Hall.

=== History ===
Created in 1989, the festival was held in 1992 and 1993 at the Cultural Center of La Clef in Paris, then at the Cultural Center André Malraux (Le Kremlin-Bicêtre) until 2000, when it took place at the theater Le Trianon. From 2010 until 2016, the festival screened l'Espace Reuilly (Paris 12e).

Since 1996, the festival has received around 7000 entries.
