= Wolfe Video =

Global LGBTQ+ film distribution company

- Industry: Entertainment
- Founded: 1985
- Founders: Kathy Wolfe
- Headquarters: United States
- Key people: Evan Schwartz (Head of Content)
- Products: Motion pictures
- Website: wolfevideo.com

Wolfe Video is the longest running and largest exclusive distributor of LGBTQ+ films in the world.

Founded in 1985 in New Almaden, California by Kathy Wolfe, the company began as a consumer mail order distribution company for gay and lesbian VHS videos and has evolved over 40 years to become an all-rights distributor of LGBTQ+ films. Wolfe Video releases LGBTQ+ films on streaming, DVD as well as film festivals, international and broadcast sales for the library of more than 125 feature films and documentaries.

Notable Wolfe Video releases over the years include the film Big Eden, Sordid Lives, Loving Annabelle, Hurricane Bianca and Elena Undone.

In 2015, Wolfe Video donated its complete DVD library of lesbian movies to the June L. Mazer Lesbian Archives.

In 2025, Wolfe Video celebrated its 40th anniversary with a streaming release strategy. Wolfe Video now offers global Membership subscriptions to its streaming catalog on the @WatchWolfeVideo YouTube channel.

List of Wolfe Video Films
Release year	Title	Director(s)	Synopsis	Notes	Ref.
1993	Claire of the Moon	Nicole Conn	Set in the lush pacific northwest, Claire of the Moon tells a timeless story of a woman's struggle as she awakens to new possibilities for love and intimacy.		
1996	Cynara	Nicole Conn	London Barrister's marriage is under strain after his affair with a shop-girl who is out to have him.		
1996	Everything Relative	Sharon Pollack	Old college friends reunite for a weekend that reopens old wounds, sparks new romances, and offers a chance at healing.		
1996	Late Bloomers	Julia Dyer	High School basketball coach, Dinah Richardt, falls for the school secretary, Carly Lumpkin, and upsets the entire school in the process.		
2000	Big Eden	Thomas Bezucha	After hearing that his grandpa Sam has had a stroke, successful artist Henry leaves his big city life to return to his idyllic birthplace. As he tends to his grandfather, he must also come to terms with his semi-closeted sexuality. Amidst this flurry of painful experiences, he fails to notice the advances of the pike, a sensitive outdoorsman who also cares for grandpa Sam		
2000	Sordid Lives	Del Shores	In this cult classic comedy from writer-director Del Shores, a gay West Hollywood actor returns home to his small Texas town for his grandmother’s funeral. As we meet the three generations of his dysfunctional family, the hilariously trashy truth of their “sordid lives” is revealed. Sordid Lives features an all-star ensemble cast, including Olivia Newton-John, Delta Burke, Bonnie Bedelia, Beau Bridges and Leslie Jordan as the Tammy Wynette-obsessed institutionalized gay uncle, Brother Boy.		
2003	200 American	Richard LeMay	When Conrad hires Ian for a night of sex, he’s drawn in by Ian’s kindness and begins to question why someone so genuine would choose this life.		
2006	Loving Annabelle	Katherine Brooks	At a strict Catholic boarding school, Annabelle, a senator’s daughter, falls in love with her teacher Simone. Their passionate connection challenges rules, tradition, and their own fears in this bold story of forbidden love.		
2006	The Gymnast	Ned Farr	Talented Jane Hawkins (Dreya Weber) was an impressive gymnast at the top of her game until a devastating injury ended her career. Years later, a chance meeting sets Jane on a new path: performing a cirque style aerial act with a mysterious dancer named Serena. As the stunning pair prepares for a Las Vegas show, the pull between them becomes increasingly unavoidable.		
2007	Finn's Girl	Dominique Cardona, Laurie Colbert	With the death of her partner Nancy, Finn must raise their daughter alone while receiving death threats at the abortion clinic Nancy founded.		
2007	Whirlwind	Richard LeMay	Drake, a charming stranger, shakes up a group of gay friends in NYC—stirring passion, jealousy, and unexpected drama.		
2008	Newcastle	Dan Castle	17-year-old Jesse's life is all about chasing waves with his brothers, but his tendency to sabotage himself holds him back from being a champion.		
2008	Ready? OK!	James Vasquez	A single woman struggles to understand her young son's obsession with dresses.		
2008	The New Twenty	Chris Mason Johnson	Five New York City friends squabble over money, and experience sexual tensions that threaten to ruin their tight-knit relationships.		
2008	Were The World Mine	Tom Gustafson	A bullied and demoralized gay student at an all-boys school uses a magical flower derived from Shakespeare's A Midsummer Night's Dream to turn many in his community gay, including a comely rugby player for himself.		
2009	And Then Came Lola	Ellen Seidler, Megan Siler	Lola has three chances to make it on time to an important meeting.		
2009	My Normal	Irving Schwartz	Hot fashion model Nicole Laliberte makes her feature film debut in this steamy, and often funny tale about a lesbian dominatrix whose new girlfriend disapproves of her career choice.		
2010	A Marine Story	Ned Farr	Marine officer Alexandra (Dreya Weber) is tough enough to kick any guy's ass in a bar fight, but there's one opponent she can't beat: military policy. When she returns to her conservative hometown from Iraq with a mysterious personal life, she finds herself charged with preparing a tempestuous teenage girl for boot camp.		
2010	Bloomington	Fernanda Cardoso	When her TV show is canceled, Jackie leaves LA to find independence. There, she falls for a teacher named Catherine, and soon finds herself in a passionate, all-consuming romance.		
2010	Elena Undone	Nicole Conn	The wife of a small town preacher, known for his sermons against same-sex marriage, finds her soulmate during a steamy affair with another woman.		
2010	Hollywood, Je T'aime	Jason Bushman	After a breakup, Jerome moves to Los Angeles to pursue his dreams. At first, the city dazzles him... but as emotions stir, he realizes the heart he left behind still matters.		
2010	Pornography: A Thriller	David Kittredge	A writer and an adult film star discover supernatural forces while searching for a porn star.		
2010	The Four Faced Liar	Jacob Chase	Molly is a bit appalled by free spirited Bridget... but she’s also attracted to her. In time, the friends’ lives are hilariously complicated when the two women fall in love.		
2011	August	Eldar Rapaport	After years in Spain, Troy (Murray Bartlett) returns to Los Angeles and reconnects with his ex, Jonathan. What starts as a casual coffee meeting turns into an emotional tangle... especially now that Jonathan has a new boyfriend and big decisions to make.		
2011	Leave It On The Floor	Sheldon Larry	A one of a kind celebration: a gay African American musical about finding one's true family.		
2011	The Green	Steven Williford	Michael Gavin (Jason Butler Harner) and his partner Daniel (Cheyenne Jackson) trade the rat race of New York City for the idyllic charm of the Connecticut shoreline, with hopes of a simpler life and time for Michael to finish his first novel. All that changes when one of Michael's high school students accuses him of 'inappropriate conduct', and the town rushes to judgment. Written by Paul Marcarelli.		
2012	Gayby	Jonathan Lisecki	Jenn and Matt (Matthew Wilkas) are best friends in their 30s who decide to have a baby the old-fashioned way. But their plans hit unexpected snags in this irreverent comedy about love, sex, and chosen family. Co-starring Adam Driver.		
2012	Kiss Me	Alexandra-Therese Keining	When Mia attends her estranged father's engagement party and meets her soon-to-be stepsister, sparks fly and Mia unexpectedly falls in love.		
2012	The Guest House	Michael Baumgarten	Blue-eyed blond bad girl Rachel is mature for her eighteen years. An aspiring songwriter, she’s given up on her music after the recent death of her mother. The arrival of Dad’s new employee Amy staying in their swanky Los Angeles guest house for the weekend brings Rachel the inspiration she needs. A wholesome college graduate fresh to California from the cornfields of Iowa, Amy happily confesses her dreams and desires to Rachel over the course of the weekend and the two women gradually fall in love! Out and about in Los Angeles the two girls can’t keep their hands off each other. At home in the guest house their activities are even hotter.		
2012	The Perfect Wedding	Scott Gabriel	Gavin and Paul, two young gay men, meet and fall in love over a holiday weekend where family and friends are planning the wedding of Paul’s sister. The problem is, Gavin is posing as the boyfriend of Paul’s ex and the two find themselves in a classic comic quandary as they try to ignore their feelings.		
2012	The Wise Kids	Stephen Cone	A vivid, dynamic Southern coming-of-age drama, takes place in the transitional space between high school and college, when life seems to be all questions and no answers, and the future is scarily wide open. Set in and around a Charleston, SC Baptist church, weaving through this ensemble piece are three main characters: Brea, an introspective pastor's daughter experiencing debilitating doubt, the hyperactive Laura, Brea's best friend and a devout believer, and Tim, the open-hearted son of a single father, confronting his homosexuality for the first time. Tensions and buried feelings abound, as colleges are chosen and adults behave badly, as Brea, Laura and Tim attempt to hang onto what they have, all the while yearning to break free.		
2013	A Perfect Ending	Nicole Conn	After confessing an unusual secret, a repressed wife decides to explore her sexuality with a high-priced call girl.		
2013	Cloudburst	Thom Fitzgerald	Stella (Olympia Dukakis) and Dot (Brenda Fricker), a longtime couple in their 70s, escape a Maine nursing home to get legally married in Nova Scotia. On the road, they pick up a young hitchhiker, and together the trio learns about love, loss, and what it means to be a family.		
2013	Four	Joshua Sanchez	This riveting drama follows four characters in a suburban town over the course of one fourth of July night, where sex, lies, desires, and truths are revealed. Starring Wendell Pierce, Emory Cohen and Aja Naomi King.		
2013	Getting Go: The Go Doc Project	Cory Krueckeberg	Doc, a college student, is obsessed with Go, a popular NYC go-go dancer. Pretending to shoot a documentary, Doc befriends his crush to get closer and learn what life is like in his skin.		
2013	Margarita	Dominique Cardona, Laurie Colbert	After losing her job, a sexy nanny faces deportation and must choose between her lawyer girlfriend and a handsome Brazilian handyman.		
2013	Reaching For The Moon	Bruno Barreto	In 1950s Brazil, poet Elizabeth Bishop (Miranda Otto) embarks on a passionate romance with architect Lota de Macedo Soares (Glória Pires), a love that defied time and tradition.		
2013	Strange Frame	G.B. Hajim	On Ganymede in the 28th century, Parker and Naia form a deep connection that allows them to operate as one.		
2013	Test	Chris Mason Johnson	Set during the early AIDS crisis, a young dancer navigates love and loss in 1980s San Francisco’s modern dance scene.		
2013	White Frog	Quentin Lee	Teen Nick struggles to stay afloat after personal tragedy disrupts his already troubled life. Starring Booboo Stewart, BD Wong, Harry Shum Jr., Gregg Sulkin, Tyler Posey and Joan Chen.		
2014	Boys	Mischa Kamp	During summer training, 15-year-old Sieger meets Marc and discovers feelings he can’t ignore. As their bond deepens, Sieger faces an inner conflict between love, identity, and the expectations of those around him.		
2014	Eat With Me	David Au	As gay chef Elliot (Teddy Chen Culver) tries to find new love with handsome blue-eyed Brit Ian (Aidan Bristow), perhaps his newly-separated mother (Sharon Omi) will find her way towards acceptance of her son as well. Featuring a special appearance by George Takei.		
2014	Hot Guys With Guns	Doug Spearman	A struggling actor, his party-boy ex, and a tough PI team up in this queer spin on the detective genre.		
2014	I Am Divine	Jeffrey Schwarz	A tribute to legendary performer Divine, this definitive documentary explores her rise to underground stardom through rare footage and interviews with icons like John Waters and Ricki Lake.		
2014	Lady Valor: The Kristin Beck Story	Mark Herzog, Sandrine Orabona	Former Navy SEAL Christopher Beck transitions to Kristin Beck and finds herself in a new fight for identity, respect, and freedom after coming out publicly.		
2014	Pit Stop	Yen Tan	Two working-class gay men in a small Texas town experience love and loss as they search for meaning and romance in their sometimes isolated lives.		
2014	Tru Love	Kate Johnston, Shauna MacDonald	A widow, recovering from the death of her husband, comes to the big city to spend time with her busy professional daughter. Instead, she forges an unlikely relationship with a commitment-phobic lesbian who has a past with her daughter.		
2015	All About E	Louise Wadley	A successful DJ hits the road with some ill-gotten cash and ends up taking refuge with the girlfriend she thought she'd lost forever.		
2015	Boy Meets Girl	Eric Schaeffer	Boy Meets Girl is a poignant, sexy, romantic coming of age comedy about three twenty year-olds living in Kentucky. Robby and his best friend since childhood, Ricky, a gorgeous transgender girl, have never dated. Lamenting the lack of eligible bachelors, Ricky considers dating a girl. In walks Francesca, a beautiful young debutante waiting for her Marine fiancé to return from the war. Ricky and Francesca strike up a friendship, and maybe a little more, which forces Robby to face his true feelings for Ricky. This is a sex/human positive modern fable and identification with its story crosses all gender and sexual orientation lines.		
2015	Coming Out	Alden Peters	Coming out follows young filmmaker Alden peters as he comes out as gay, capturing everything on camera as it happens. This groundbreaking coming-of-age film places viewers directly inside the raw, intimate moments when Alden reveals his true identity to his family and friends, ranging from the painfully awkward to the hilariously honest.		
2015	Girls Lost	Alexandra-Therese Keining	The friendship between three girls is tested after they plant a magical flower which nectar allows them to experience life as boys. Geeky girls by day and popular boys by night, they find themselves living in two completely different worlds. with optional English subtitles		
2015	Happy End	Petra Clever	Two women set off on a wild journey to deliver their friend’s ashes to her final resting place against her family's wishes.		
2015	Liz In September	Fina Torres	Every year, Liz, a hardcore party girl and womanizer, celebrates her birthday with her friends at a Caribbean beach retreat. This year is different. She is sick but hates pity, so she hides her terminal illness. When a young woman outsider arrives, Liz's friends dare her to seduce her. But the ingénue is deeply wounded by the recent death of her young son, and nothing turns out as expected.		
2015	Me, Myself, and Her	Maria Sole Tognazzi	A restaurateur and an architect seem to have it all until a run-in with an old flame throws their relationship into question.		
2015	Parched	Leena Yadav	Four women in Gujarat talk about men, sex and life as they struggle with their individual demons.		
2015	Seashore	Marcio Reolon, Filipe Matzembacher	Having been good friends for years, Martin and Tomaz now find themselves on the cusp of adulthood. Martin's father sends his son to southern Brazil, where the family is from, to sort out an inheritance matter. Tomaz accompanies him there. For both of them, the brief excursion to the coastal town becomes a journey into themselves. It is not just the sea that nearly reaches the doors of the country house which exerts a slow, yet relentless pull on them...the two friends have the same effect on one another. Filipe Sanzenbacher and Marcio reelin's richly atmospheric, autobiographically inspired feature debut follows its two main characters on a weekend that will change their relationship forever. Seashore wanders through the borderlands between love and friendship, exploring sexual orientation and personal identity.		
2015	Summer	Colette Bothof	A quiet girl spends her summer longing to escape her small town and its ever-humming power plant.		
2015	The Girl King	Mika Kaurismäki	The steamy and sumptuous story of one of the most iconic queens in history, queen Kristina of Sweden. She defied convention, challenged tradition and changed the course of history.		
2015	Those People	Joey Kuhn	On NYC's gilded upper east side, a young, gay painter finds his heart divided between an older, foreign pianist and his unscrupulous best friend.		
2015	Women He's Undressed	Gillian Armstrong	Women he's undressed is a cinema length documentary that explores the life of Australia's most prolific costume designer. He designed for the stars like Marilyn Monroe, Bette Davis, Humphrey bogart, Rosalind Russell, Errol Flynn and many more of the immortals...Orry-Kelly won three Academy Awards and was nominated for a fourth. He was head of Warner Brothers' costume department during the richest period of American film, the establishment of the dream factory and its effect on mass culture. He was outrageous, witty, outspoken, a drinker and uncompromising but he survived partially protected by his friendship with jack and Ann warner and gossip columnist Hedda Hopper and ultimately by his extraordinary talent.		
2016	A Date For Mad Mary	Darren Thornton	"Mad" Mary McArdle returns to Drogheda after a short spell in prison for something she'd rather forget. Back home, everything and everyone has changed. Her best friend, Charlene, is about to get married and Mary is maid of honor. When Charlene refuses Mary a 'plus one' on the grounds that she probably couldn't find a date, Mary becomes determined to prove her wrong.		
2016	Departure	Andrew Steggall	Stevenson plays Beatrice, an independent and strong willed woman in midst of starting again. She is in the middle of a separation from her husband and is trying to work out how to live life on her own terms. Together with her son, Elliot they have come to their holiday home in the French countryside where they are getting ready to pack up and sell the house.		
2016	Fire Song	Adam Garnet Jones	After his sister's death, a closeted gay Anishinaabe teenager in small town northern Ontario must choose between leaving for college and staying behind to support his family		
2016	Heartland	Maura Anderson	An artist whose lover died moves in with her mom, whose hopes that her daughter will go straight are disrupted by her brother's intense girlfriend		
2016	Henry Gamble's Birthday Party	Stephen Cone	Henry Gamble's Birthday Party spans the 24 hours containing the birthday pool party of 17-year-old preacher's kid Henry Gamble. The party guests include the assistant pastor, youth minister, husbands and wives; sons and daughters trapped between youth and adulthood, as well as Henry's own teenaged church and secular friends, including the closeted young logan, who has eyes for Henry. As day turns to night and clothes come off, Henry and company carefully navigate the religious strictures and sexual secrets held within the community, all struggling to tread the public and private, and their longing, despite themselves and their faith, for earthly love.		
2016	How To Win At Checkers (Every Time)	Josh Kim	An 11-year-old boy steals money for bribes to remove his gay older brother from Thai military conscription rolls, unaware of the ramifications.		
2016	Hurricane Bianca	Matt Kugelman	A fast-paced revenge comedy starring RuPaul’s Drag Race winner Bianca Del Rio (Roy Haylock). When Richard, a New York teacher, can’t find work, he accepts a position in a small Texas school. Almost immediately, they suss out that he is gay, and fire him. Later, when a new friend introduces him to the underground drag scene, Richard dons a new identity as the sharp-tongued and utterly hilarious “Bianca,” and returns to the school to wreak havoc. As everyone quickly learns, this is one teacher you definitely do NOT want to cross.		
2016	Jonathan	Piotr J. Lewandowski	Jonathan also devotes himself to looking after his father who has cancer. Then Burghardt's long-lost boyhood friend appears on the scene and his health visibly improves. Jonathan discovers that, many years ago, his father and Ron were deeply in love. All at once, the facade of cherished family beliefs crumbles and long-repressed secrets come to light.		
2016	Naz & Maalik	Jay Dockendorf	Two gay Muslim teens, who spend their days selling odds and ends on Brooklyn street corner, run afoul of an FBI agent who suspects they're terrorists.		
2016	Other People	Chris Kelly	A struggling comedy writer, fresh off a breakup and in the midst of the worst year of his life, returns to sacramento to care for his dying mother.		
2016	Packed in a Trunk: the Lost Art of Edith Lake Wilkinson	Michelle Boyaner	Like a fast-paced detective story, PACKED IN A TRUNK celebrates the life of Edith Lake Wilkinson, a gifted and prolific lesbian artist who, in 1924, was committed to an asylum. All of Edith’s worldly possessions were packed into trunks and she was never heard from again. Edith’s great-niece, Jane Anderson grew up surrounded by Edith’s paintings after her mother discovered the trunks in their relative’s attic and rescued the work. This delightful film follows Jane and her spouse Tess in their efforts to find answers to the mystery of Edith’s buried life, return her art to Provincetown where she once lived and thrived, and have Edith’s contributions recognized by the art world.		
2016	Paris 05:59 - Theo and Hugo	Jacques Martineau, Olivier Ducastel	A brief encounter at a naked sex club in Paris seems to be going well for Theo and Hugo, but a sudden realization changes everything		
2016	Portrait of A Serial Monogamist	John Mitchell, Christina Zeidler	A forty-something lesbian and accomplished breakup artist leaves her long-term girlfriend to pursue a younger woman, only to be haunted by memories of the past and the growing realization that she may have broken up with the love of her life.		
2016	Shared Rooms	Rob Williams	A sexy, feel-good gay romantic comedy. In this romantic holiday comedy, married Laslo and Cal take in a gay teen who's been kicked out of his home; Sid and gray have a casual online hookup which unexpectedly deepens; and Julian and Dylan confront their secret mutual attraction when forced to share a bed for a week. their stories come together at a "Steve not Eve" New Year's party.		
2016	The Royal Road	Jenni Olson	A cinematic essay in defense of remembering, the royal road offers up a primer on Junipero serra's Spanish colonization of California and the Mexican American war alongside intimate reflections on nostalgia, the pursuit of unavailable women, butch identity and Alfred Hitchcock's vertigo — all against a contemplative backdrop of 16mm urban California landscapes, and featuring a voiceover cameo by tony Kushner. This bold, innovative film from acclaimed San Francisco filmmaker Jenni Olson combines rigorous historical research with lyrically written personal monologue and relates these seemingly disparate stories from an intimate, colloquial perspective to tell a one-of-a-kind California tale.		
2016	Tiger Orange	Wade Gasque	Estranged gay brothers Chet and Todd reunite after their father’s death, confronting old wounds, small-town prejudice, and their shared past in this poignant family drama.		
2017	Akron	Brian O'Donnell, Sasha King	Benny and Christopher, college freshmen, meet playing football and begin a relationship. They fall in love supported by their family and friends. As their love for each other grows, a past tragic event involving their mothers comes to light. This revelation tests their own love and Benny’s close-knit family. Throughout this reflective love story, with the beauty of rural Ohio as its backdrop, Benny travels an emotional journey that examines both his own feelings and his family’s ability to come to terms with the past.		
2017	Cherry Pop	Assaad Yacoub	A newcomer’s wild night at a down-and-out drag club leads to mayhem, glitter, and unfiltered comedy in this over-the-top, outrageous romp.		
2017	Counting for Thunder	Phillip Irwin Cooper	Counting for Thunder is inspired by the three years when Phillip Irwin Cooper, unlucky in work, money and love, went home to the Gulf Coast of Alabama after his relationship hit the skids and at the same time his mother received a dire medical diagnosis. Working through his past with his complicated family, some old high school chums, and the desperate and hilarious southern characters who grace his hometown, Phillip learns more about his mother than he ever bargained for, and more about himself than he ever guessed possible. He ultimately finds his own voice as his mother is regaining hers. Counting for Thunder covers many of the same universal themes of love, life, sex and death as Fried Green Tomatoes and Steel Magnolias. Producer Marsha Oglesby, who grew up in the South, compares the heart of Counting for Thunder to Terms of Endearment, as played between a mother and son.		
2017	Princess Cyd	Stephen Cone	A 16-year-old girl visits her aunt in Chicago for the summer. While there, she falls for another girl, and she and her aunt challenge each other's sex and spirit.		
2017	Seventeen	Monja Art	Somewhere in Lower Austria, the school term is drawing to a close and the Summer holidays are not far off. Seventeen year old boarding school pupil Paula, is secretly in love with her friend Charlotte. But Charlotte’s going out with Michael. Lovelorn, Paula decides to try and take her mind off things by getting involved with schoolmate Tim, whose feelings for her are genuine. And then there’s Lilli, who is just dying for someone to fancy her and tries to play the wild seductress. Paula must decide if she wants to follow her own feelings or yield to other people’s.		
2017	You're Killing Me	Jim Hansen	A gay mixture of Dexter and Gilmore Girls, blending witty banter, pop culture references and good old-fashioned murder! George, a narcissistic wannabe internet star, starts dating Joe, a monotone serial killer. While all of George's friends agree that Joe seems a bit strange, George claims his new beau "isn't scary, he's gorgeous. " But as George's friends start to disappear, the remaining group decides to take matters into their own hands.		
2018	1985	Yen Tan	Having been gone for three years, closeted advertising executive Adrian returns to his Texas hometown and struggles to reveal his dire circumstances to his conservative family. Starring Cory Michael Smith, Virginia Madsen, Michael Chiklis and Jamie Chung.		
2018	5B	Paul Haggis, Dan Krauss	Documentary about the staff and patients of san francisco general hospital's aids ward during the early years of the epidemic.	DVD Release with Vertical Entertainment.	
2018	Anchor and Hope	Carlos Marques-Marcet	A touchingly intimate portrait of what it means to be a family in the present day from multi-award-winning writer/director Carlos Marques-Marce, this poignant romantic comedy is set on and around the rarely-filmed London canal system. Eva and Kat's carefree lifestyle is turned upside down when Eva says she wants a child. Can their heartfelt friendship survive what is to come? Starring Oona Chaplin, Natalia Tena and Geraldine Chaplin.		
2018	Giant Little Ones	Keith Behrman	Two popular teen boys, best friends since childhood, discover their lives, families, and girlfriends dramatically upended after an unexpected incident occurs on the night of a 17th birthday party.	DVD release with Vertical Entertainment.	
2018	Hurricane Bianca 2	Matt Kugelman	After winning over the staff and students of Milford high school, chemistry teacher Richard Martinez aka Bianca del Rio sent her nemesis Vice Principal Deborah "Debbie" Ward to jail in a flawlessly executed plan. When Debbie is released from jail, she conjures up a scheme to do away with Bianca del Rio once and for all, by luring her on a dangerous journey to Russia to accept a teaching award and cash prize.		
2018	Just Charlie	Rebekah Fortune	Soccer star Charlie has the world at his feet. With a top club desperate to sign him, his future is seemingly mapped out...but the teenager sees only a nightmare. Trapped in the body of a boy, Charlie is torn between wanting to live up to her father's expectations and shedding this ill-fitting skin. Charlie's next move will tear the family apart and threaten everything they hold dear.		
2018	Just Friends	Annemarie van de Mond	Joris is shy, introverted and cautious. Yad is bold and impulsive. At a chance meeting, opposites attract, and sparks fly.		
2018	Mario	Marcel Gisler	On the pitch, Leon and Mario are talented strikers locked in a battle for a spot on the first team. Off the pitch, they're much more than teammates...		
2018	Russian Doll	Ed Gaffney	Imagine a beautiful but troubled police detective, with the soul of Humphrey Bogart and the heart of a warrior, still grieving two years after the death of her wife. Now add an abducted woman, a thirty-year-old mystery, and a killer hiding in plain sight...		
2018	Sebastian	James Fanizza	Sebastian arrives in the city on a one week visit and meets his cousin's boyfriend, Alex. instant attraction leads Alex and Sebastian to explore a forbidden passion. when Sebastian returns to Argentina, will their affair continue? This feature debut from James Fanizza features Katya from the Trixie and Katya Show and RuPaul's Drag Race.		
2018	Venus	Eisha Marjara	Sid is under pressure to marry a nice Indian girl and raise a family. Sid's east Indian mother yearns to have grandchildren. Her dreams are about to come true, but not in the way she could've ever imagined. When Sid comes out as a woman, a 14 year old boy named ralph literally shows up at her door announcing that Sid is his parent. Although surprised to discover that his biological dad is now a woman, ralph thinks having a transgender parent is pretty cool. But he hasn't told his mother and step dad that he's tracked down his biological father. and then there is Sid's boyfriend Daniel, who has yet to tell his family of his relationship with Sid. Daniel is nowhere near ready to accept ralph as a step son and complicate his life further. Sid's coming out has a snowball effect that forces everyone out of the closet. what happens when gender, generations and cultures collide to create a truly modern family?		
2019	Adam	Rhys Ernst	Awkward teen Adam spends his last high school summer in New York City with his sister, Casey (Margaret Qualley), who throws herself into the city's lesbian and trans activist scene. When Adam is mistaken for a transgender man at a party, he decides to keep up a charade. Selected at Sundance, this uplifting comedy drama is from the producer of Brokeback Mountain.		
2019	Almost Love	Mike Doyle	An ensemble comedy about romance in the modern era.	DVD release with Vertical Entertainment.	
2019	Hard Paint	Marcio Reolon, Filipe Matzembacher	Set in Brazil's southern city of Porto Alegre, the film focuses on a socially repressed young man who only comes out of his shell during chatroom performances, when he strips and smears neon paints on his lithe body.		
2019	More Beautiful for Having Been Broken	Nicole Conn	Nicole Conn, director and writer of classic romances including A Perfect Ending and Elena Undone, presents her new film More Beautiful For Having Been Broken. FBI agent Mckenzie escapes to the picturesque ranch town of Mervielle in the aftermath of losing her mother and spirals down a path of erratic behavior. Upon settling in, Mckenzie meets Freddie, a young wheelchair-using boy with special needs and his mother, Samantha, a former dancer. As Mckenzie makes an impression on the residents of Mervielle, she develops an unexpected relationship with Samantha that turns fiercely passionate and intimate.		
2019	Retablo	Alvaro Delgado Aparicio	Segundo Paucar, a 14 year old boy wants to become a master story-box maker just like his father to carry on with the family legacy. On his way to a community celebration in the Andes, Segundo accidentally observes his father in a situation that shatters his whole world. Trapped in a chauvinistic environment, Segundo will try to deal in silence with all that is happening to him. Nominated for 2020 Film Independent Spirit Award for Best International Film.		
2019	Where We Go From Here	Anthony Meindl	Three acts of terror disrupt the lives of ordinary people. In Binghamton, an ESL teacher dealing with domestic abuse finds even greater violence at her school. In Orlando, two lovers drifting apart may be separated by the hate of another. In Paris, friends on an introspective night out are caught up in a brutal madness.		
2020	An Almost Ordinary Summer	Simone Godano	Two very different families spend their holidays in the same house at the seaside: the aristocratic Castelvecchios, open-minded, eccentric, but quite selfish, and the working-class Petagnas, very tight-knit, and united around solid conservative values. What brought such distant worlds together? Only Tony and Carlo, the two middle-aged heads of the families, know! The unexpected announcement of their engagement will disrupt an apparently ordinary summer and turn the lives of everyone around them upside down.		
2020	Breaking Fast	Mike Mosallem	Mo, a practicing muslim living in west hollywood, is learning to navigate life post heartbreak. Enter Kal, an all-American guy who surprises Mo by offering to break fast with him during the holy month of Ramadan.	DVD release with Vertical Entertainment.	
2020	Good Kisser	Wendy Jo Carlton	Jenna and Kate open up their relationship to an alluring stranger in the hopes of spicing up their two-year romance, only for it to expose the faults in their foundation.		
2020	Jules of Light and Dark	Daniel Laabs	After a car wreck, Maya and her on-again, off-again girlfriend Jules are rescued by Freddy, a lonely oil worker. As bonds deepen, the three face their desires and loneliness in small-town Texas.		
2020	Nevrland	Gregor Schmidinger	In this dark, sexy, psychological coming-of-age drama, 17-year-old Jakob struggles with crippling anxiety and takes refuge in the Internet. While on a cam-chat site, he meets 26-year-old artist Kristjan. Caught between reality and fantasy, youth and adulthood, Jakob’s blurry process of sexual awakening is a psychedelic trip of hot, strange hallucinatory sequences of desire and madness that will bring you to the edge of your seat.		
2020	Supernova	Harry Macqueen	Sam (Colin Firth) and Tusker (Stanley Tucci) are traveling across england in their old rv to visit friends, family and places from their past. since tusker was diagnosed with dementia two years ago, their time together is the most important thing they have.	DVD release with Bleecker Street.	
2020	The World To Come	Mona Fastvold	Somewhere along the mid-19th century american east coast frontier, two neighboring couples battle hardship and isolation, witnessed by a splendid yet testing landscape, challenging them both physically and psychologically. Starring Katherine Waterston, Vanessa Kirby, Christopher Abbott and Casey Affleck.	DVD release with Bleecker Street.	
2020	Women Behind Bars	Scott Thompson	Women behind bars is a hilarious, camp, dark comedy play set in the women's house of detention in Greenwich village in the 1960's. overseeing the prison is the matron, a deliciously-evil nightmare of a woman named Pauline Weiskurcher and her long-suffering henchwoman, Louise.		
2021	Ahead of The Curve	Rivkah Beth Medow, Jen Rainin	Ahead of the Curve explores the rise of lesbian visibility and community from the early ’90s to today, told through the story of Franco’s founding of Curve magazine.		
2021	Blessed Boys (La Santa Piccola)	Silvia Brunelli	Two best friends, live a quiet life until a mysterious door opens to another world, sending them on separate paths and putting their friendship to the ultimate test.		
2021	Death And Bowling	Lyle Kash	A transgender actor wrestles with identity and grief after the death of his bowling league captain and the arrival of a mysterious stranger.		
2021	Milkwater	Morgan Ingari	Seeking direction and purpose, Milo rashly decides to become a surrogate and egg donor for an older gay man she meets in a bar. However, as Milo becomes increasingly attached to him, she starts leveraging the pregnancy as a means of staying embedded in his life		
2021	The Obituary of Tunde Johnson	Ali LeRoi	A wealthy Nigerian American teen is pulled over by police, shot to death and immediately awakens, reliving the same day over and over, trapped in a terrifying time loop- forced to confront difficult truths about his life and himself.		
2021	Wildhood	Bretten Hannam	A two-spirit teenager runs away from home to find his birth mother and reclaim his Mi'kmaw heritage.		
2022	It Is In Us All	Antonia Campbell-Hughes	Hamish journeys to Ireland, his late mother’s homeland. After a car accident, he begins to unravel emotionally... until a mysterious teenager from the crash changes everything.		
2023	Nelly & Nadine	Magnus Gertten	The nearly forgotten history of one of the greatest love stories never told.	Winner of 2022 Teddy Jury Award.	
2023	The Sixth Reel	Carl Andress, Charles Busch	A lost film reel is found after a friend’s death, sparking chaos as a group of eccentric collectors hatch wild plans to claim the fortune for themselves.		
2024	National Anthem	Luke Gilford	Dylan, a 21-year old construction worker in rural New Mexico, joins a community of queer ranchers and rodeo performers in search of their own version of the American dream.	Released on Hulu.	
2024	Sue Bird: in the Clutch	Sarah Dowland	In her 21-year professional career, WNBA basketball legend Sue Bird has won five Olympic gold medals and become the most successful point guard to ever play the game. Alongside her fiancée, U.S. soccer star Megan Rapinoe, Sue confronts her next challenge: retiring from the only life she’s ever known.A trailblazer in every sense of the word, Sue Bird achieved a powerful impact on the game of basketball. Navigating through adversity in the form of sexism, anti-LGBTQ+ prejudice, and racism toward many of her peers, she managed to forge a path for young women that previously didn’t exist. The lack of resources for women’s sports in the U.S. led Bird to spend her offseasons playing in Russia, where, ironically, she received the recognition and equity that her male counterparts enjoyed back at home. Emmy and Peabody Award–winning documentarian Sarah Dowland gets to the heart of what makes Bird one of the greatest and most influential athletes the world has ever seen, both on and off the court.		
2025	Witchy Ways	Jane Clark	Eve visits a magical cabin, where its mysterious owner, Danni, unlocks her heart, until dark secrets, witchy spells, and an angry ghost threaten their chance at love.		
2025	Outerlands	Elena Oxman	30-something Cass (Asia Kate Dillon) hustles jobs as a server, nanny, and party drug dealer to make rent on their tiny San Francisco apartment. When Cass agrees to babysit Ari (Ridley Asha Bateman), the 11-year-old daughter of Kalli (Louisa Krause), their crush from work, Cass hopes it might lead to romance. When Kalli fails to return, Cass’s memories of their own difficult childhood begin to resurface. Feeling alone yet bonded together, Cass and Ari race to find Kalli and the power to heal		
2026	The Wave (La Ola)	Sebastián Lelio	A Chilean student gets involved in a feminist movement on her university. Suddenly, she finds herself becoming a central figure in the movement.		

== See also ==
- List of lesbian, gay, bisexual, or transgender-related films by storyline
