= Princess Cyd =

2017 film by Stephen Cone

- Theatrical release poster
- Directed by: Stephen Cone
- Written by: Stephen Cone
- Produced by: Grace Hahn; Madison Ginsberg; Stephen Cone
- Starring: Rebecca Spence; Jessie Pinnick; Ro White (Note: Credited as Malic White); James Vincent Meredith; Matthew Quattrocki; Tyler Ross
- Cinematography: Zoë White
- Edited by: Christopher Gotschall
- Music by: Heather McIntosh
- Production company: Sunroom Pictures
- Distributed by: Wolfe Releasing
- Release dates: May 4, 2017 (Maryland Film Festival); November 3, 2017 (United States)
- Running time: 96 minutes
- Country: United States
- Language: English

Princess Cyd is a 2017 American coming-of-age drama film written and directed by Stephen Cone and starring Rebecca Spence, Jessie Pinnick, and Ro White.

== Plot ==
Cyd Loughlin, a headstrong 16-year-old, is sent away from her home in Columbia, South Carolina, to spend the summer in Chicago with her estranged aunt Miranda, a kindhearted author of religious fiction. Despite the initial awkwardness, the two gradually grow close. As the summer progresses, they become acquainted with each other over various activities, including going out for meals, walks around the neighborhood, and sunbathing. Both women become more like the other, with Cyd becoming more cultured and Miranda more easygoing. Cyd's mother (Miranda's sister) died when she was young, and the two discuss whether she is waiting for them in Heaven.

Despite having a boyfriend back home, Cyd explores her sexuality, developing a romance with a local barista named Katie, as well as a neighborhood boy. Miranda and her colleague Anthony have romantic feelings for one another, but neither are willing to make the first move. Cyd privately suggests to both of them that they should ask the other one on a date.

One night, Miranda hosts a large gathering of friends and creatives, where Cyd opts to wear a tuxedo instead of something more feminine. After the party, Cyd unwittingly insults Miranda's lack of a sex life, which causes brief friction between the two. Miranda sternly but kindly explains that she derives pleasure from activities other than sex, such as reading and going to church, before declaring that "it is not a handicap to have one thing, but not another", and that mutual respect is a key factor in any healthy relationship.

That same evening, Katie texts Cyd for help after nearly being sexually assaulted by her brother's roommate. Cyd and Miranda come to her rescue, and Katie comes to stay with them for the remainder of the summer. After a day at the beach, Cyd and Katie have sex. Cyd shares that when she was a child, her older brother murdered their mother and then took his own life, and that living with her grief-stricken father has not been easy.

Cyd discovers that she was named after the lead character in one of Miranda's earliest books, Princess Cydney, which Miranda dedicated to her sister.

As the summer ends, Cyd and Katie promise to visit each other, and attend an event for Miranda's new book. After one last block party, Cyd returns to Columbia. Some time later, Cyd receives a call from Miranda, and the two affirm their love for one another.

== Cast ==
- Rebecca Spence as Miranda Ruth, Cyd's estranged aunt and a famous author of both fiction and non-fiction
- Jessie Pinnick as Cyd Loughlin, a teenager who is in the process of discovering herself and the world around her
- Ro White as Katie Sauter, Cyd's non-binary love interest who teaches Cyd about living in Chicago
- James Vincent Meredith as Anthony James, Miranda's colleague and would-be love interest
- Matthew Quattrocki as Ridley, a neighborhood boy with whom Cyd has a brief romantic connection
- Tyler Ross as Tab, Katie's brother's roommate who ends up assaulting Katie

Stephen Cone has an uncredited voice cameo as the 911 caller at the beginning of the film.

== Production ==
Principal photography for Princess Cyd took place in Chicago from August 31 to September 25, 2016. Cone had originally conceived the story as taking place in his childhood home of South Carolina, as with his 2011 breakout film The Wise Kids. Cone later decided to shift the story to Chicago, however, recalling, "I was walking down Sunnyside Avenue one day, towards my friend's house at Damen and Sunnyside, and I love the houses along the way there, and suddenly the story just kind of shifted in my head." He added, "I thought, very easily one of these houses could be inhabited by a well-regarded Chicago author, and maybe this is a summer tale set in Chicago. So suddenly this female-led excursion into Chicago became a love letter to women, a love letter to Chicago, a love letter to queerness."

The character of Katie was written without any gender in mind; it was not decided until casting whether the character would be male, female, or non-binary.

Special permission was granted from James Baldwin's estate to use excerpts from his work during the dinner party scene.

== Release ==
Princess Cyd had its world premiere at the Maryland Film Festival on May 4, 2017. Its New York City premiere was held at the BAMcinemaFest on June 17, 2017. The film also screened at the BFI London Film Festival in October 2017. In May 2017, the film was picked up by Wolfe Releasing for a theatrical and VOD release. Princess Cyd was given a limited theatrical release in New York City and Chicago on November 3, 2017, and Los Angeles on December 1, followed by a DVD release on December 5.

== Reception ==
Princess Cyd received a positive response from film critics, appearing on Best of 2017 lists in Vanity Fair, Vox, Vulture, IndieWire, and NPR, among others. On the review aggregator website Rotten Tomatoes, the film holds an approval rating of 95% based on 44 reviews, with an average rating of 7.8/10. The website's critics consensus reads, "Princess Cyd defies coming-of-age convention to offer a sweetly understated – yet deeply resonant – look at pivotal relationships." Metacritic, which uses a weighted average, assigned the film a score of 72 out of 100, based on 10 critics, indicating "generally favorable" reviews.

Calum Marsh of The Village Voice compared the film favorably to Cone's previous work Henry Gamble's Birthday Party and called it "an endearing, full-hearted comedy of self-discovery and mentorship and love." However, another review in the same paper by April Wolfe, while approving of the film overall, said it portrayed characters as too unaffected by tragedy or traumatic events. The film was similarly praised by Jude Dry of IndieWire, who observed, "In his latest film, Princess Cyd, the Chicago-based writer-director renders his deeply human characters so precisely, it's as if they stepped right off the screen and into your living room. The two central women are equal parts charming, awkward, yearning and lost. In short, they're real. Their complexity is all the more impressive coming from a male filmmaker — Cone proves it's possible for men to write sexually liberated, empowered, autonomous women."

Conversely, Nick Schager of Variety called it a "precious, threadbare indie" and wrote, "Caring more about what its characters represent – and its empathetic representation of them – than about crafting a fully formed drama concerning flesh-and-blood people, Cone's film has little more than its heart in the right place."
