= Alex Weisman =

American stage actor (born 1987)

- Born: Alex Weisman; July 16, 1987 (age 39); Davie, Florida
- Years active: 2009–present

Alex Weisman (born July 16, 1987) is a stage actor, who is best known for his performance as Posner in TimeLine Theatre Company's debut production of the play, The History Boys He is the younger brother of Robin Weisman.

== Personal life and career ==
Weisman began acting when he was a baby, as he landed his first acting job as a baby model. As he grew up in Davie, Florida. he has had many regional credits there including Madame Melville, The Legacy (New Theatre) and The Chronicles of Narnia: The Lion, The Witch, and the Wardrobe (Actor's Playhouse). Alex graduated from Northwestern University with a BS in theater in May 2010. He performed in several shows there including In the Bubble playing the part of Joey, Peter Pan as Michael, Amadeus as Mozart, and others. On April 22, 2009, he began performing as the role of Posner in TimeLine Theatre's production of The History Boys. It ran for six months, and ended on October 18, 2009. The show won every Jeff Award it was nominated for at the 41st Annual Equity Jeff Awards at Skokie's North Shore Center for the Performing Arts in 2009. On November 20, 2009, Weisman began performing as The Ghost of Christmas Past and Stephen in the Goodman Theatre's 31st Annual Production of A Christmas Carol. Alex has performed as Charlie Brown in the musical You're a Good Man, Charlie Brown at the Theatre and Interpretation Center (TIC) at Northwestern University. Chicago credits include Michael Darling in Lookingglass Theatre production of Peter Pan, David in Goodman Theatre's production of Mary by Thomas Bradshaw, The Duke of York in The Madness of King George III at the Chicago Shakespeare Theater, The Observer in Putting It Together at Porchlight Music Theatre, Victor in the world premiere musical adaptation of Brian Selznick's The Houdini Box at Chicago Children's Theater, Richard Miller in Ah! Wilderness at Eclipse Theater Company, Phillip Clandon in You Never Can Tell at Remy Bummpo, and Lucius in Julius Caesar at Chicago Shakespeare Theater.

Weisman had the title role of Asher Lev in the 2014 production of My Name is Asher Lev, by Timeline Theater. In 2015, Weisman had a prominent role as Quentin, in the premiere production of the musical drama October Sky, at the Marriott Theatre, Lincolnshire, Illinois. He also played Horst in The Other Theater Company's revival of Bent.

In film, Weisman has appeared in Stephen Cone's 2013 drama Black Box and the 2019 political thriller An Acceptable Loss. On television, he has appeared in Chicago P.D., Chicago Fire, and Chicago Med.

In November 2020, Weisman was assaulted on a subway station platform in Manhattan. Weisman suffered a torn retina and a skull injury in the attack.

== Awards and reviews ==
Weisman has won two Chicago Jeff Equity Awards for his performance as Posner in TimeLine Theatre's The History Boys including Best Supporting Actor in a play, and as a part of Best Ensemble. He was recently nominated for Best Actor in a Leading Role at the 2013 Non-Equity Jeff Awards for his work in Ah! Wilderness at Eclipse Theater Company.

Alex has also received several positive reviews from Chicago theater critics and newspapers, throughout his career. He was featured in the Chicago Tribune‘s “On the Town” section as one of six “Hot New Faces” in Chicago theater. During an interview with Raquel Mendoza, from TimeLine Theatre Company, he was quoted saying, "Don’t let people tell you who you are. If you let someone else explain who you are, then you have to fight for your uniqueness. Acknowledge everything that you are feeling and let yourself be free to be who you are.”
