= Black Box (2013 film) =

- Directed by: Stephen Cone
- Written by: Stephen Cone
- Produced by: Keith Cardoza; Stephen Cone; Sarah Horton; Laura Klein
- Starring: Josephine Decker; Austin Pendleton
- Cinematography: Stephanie Dufford
- Edited by: Stephen Cone
- Music by: Heather McIntosh
- Release date: August 25, 2013 (U.S.)
- Country: United States
- Language: English

Black Box is a 2013 drama film written and directed by Stephen Cone and starring Josephine Decker and Austin Pendleton.

== Plot ==
Holly Pollard is in an undergrad student in a directing program at her college. She forsakes her advisor's direction to do a standard play for her first production opting instead to adapt a 1980s young adult novel called The Children's Reaper for the stage. The book is about a group of children terrified and abused by their seemingly overly-religious foster parents. Holly has had the book since she was a teenager and has written her name and the year 1993 when a young girl inside the front cover to signify the book belongs to her. Through rehearsals, we watch her young cast struggle with the material as they hone their performances. They have myriad reactions to the way the material and the rehearsals affect their real lives including their sexuality and personal interactions.

Holly is also sleeping with Jarrett, who appears to be a Junior Advisor at school. Eddie is married with a pregnant wife. Adam is struggling with coming out. Brandon is openly and almost fiercely bisexual. Madeline admits that a kiss during a rehearsal was actually her very first kiss. Madeline also struggles with doing a nude scene. Eventually, during a drunken post-rehearsal party, Madeline asks Terra to make out with her while, elsewhere in the building, Adam and Brandon hook up and, within the next few days, seem to begin a relationship.

William Peters (Austin Pendleton) the author of the book comes to rehearsals. While walking together with Adam their discussion leads Adam to wonder if the older man is also gay. When one of the actors is sick, he helps with a scene but he seems overwhelmed and has to stop. He continues to stay in town and come to rehearsals often nitpicking at Holly's way of presenting the adaptation. Eventually it is obvious that the source material is autobiographical and seeing it performed is causing Peters great mental anguish.

On opening night a girl brings Brandon flowers backstage although he insists it is not what it seems. Holly hears Madeline's family discussing how they should look away during a part of the performance. Peters leaves on a plan without seeing the performance. Overall, the performance goes well.

Seemingly a few days later, at home, Holly opens her worn copy of the novel which she has been carrying throughout the production. Under where she has written her name and 1993, the author has written his name, William Peters, and the current year, 2013.

== Cast ==
- Josephine Decker as Holly
- Austin Pendleton as William Peters
- Jaclyn Hennell as Madeline
- Alex Weisman as Adam
- Nick Vidal as Brandon
- Dennis Grimes as Eddie
- Elaine Ivy Harris as Terra
- Matt Holzfeind as Jarrett
- Maggie Suma as Amy
- Hanna Dworkin as Pamela

== Production ==
Black Box was filmed on location in Illinois, with exteriors shot around Illinois State University in Normal and interiors shot in black box theater space at the Viaduct theater. Cone has stated that elements of the plot were inspired by the 1987 film adaptation of V. C. Andrews's Flowers in the Attic.

== Release ==
Black Box first premiered at the 15th Sidewalk Moving Picture Festival in Birmingham, Alabama on August 25, 2013. The film had a limited film festival run, playing at the Cucalorus Film Festival, the Fort Lauderdale International Film Festival, and the LGBT Reeling Film Festival, where Black Box made its Chicago premiere in November, 2013.

=== Media ===
Though a critics' poll by Indiewire named it the seventh best film of 2013 to remain undistributed, Black Box was eventually picked up by Devolver Digital Films for a cable/VOD release in late 2014.

== Reception ==
Despite a limited release, Black Box received a very positive response from critics. Newcity's Ray Pride called the film "ambitious" and praised Pendleton's performances as "ever-fascinating." Paul Bower of the online magazine Tiny Mix Tapes further lauded the film, saying "Preparing a play, rehearsing and fleshing out the writing, forces its participants to get super vulnerable (if it's done right, anyway) and face things about themselves in front of a group of other people that can cause all sorts of embarrassment if done in a hostile environment. The great thing about Stephen Cone's Black Box is that it understands this terrifying thing about doing theater to such a devastating extent that the film can, rightly, become hard to watch at times." Michael Phillips of the Chicago Tribune gave the film 3½ out of 4 stars, calling it "a worthy follow-up to Cone's previous film" and adding, "I hope Cone keeps writing and making movies because he has what a lot of other writer-directors do not: an interest in character; a facility for drawing fine, subdued on-camera work from stage performers; and a knack for pulling together a variety of sympathetic characters at a crucial point in their collective lives."
