= Tyler Ross =

American actor

Tyler Ross is an American actor best known for playing Kyle Stansbury in season four of the television series The Killing and for starring in the Stephen Cone films The Wise Kids (2011), Henry Gamble's Birthday Party (2015), and Princess Cyd (2017). Ross has also appeared in the series Boss, NCIS, Major Crimes, Crash & Bernstein, Battle Creek, and 9-1-1 and the films The Lovers (2017), Officer Downe (2016), American Milkshake (2013), and Nate & Margaret (2012).

== Filmography ==
=== Film ===
Year	Title	Role	Notes
2005	Little Men	Thomas	
2011	The Wise Kids	Tim	
2012	Nate & Margaret	Nate	
2013	American Milkshake	Jolie	
2015	Henry Gamble's Birthday Party	Aaron	
2016	Officer Downe	Gable	
2017	The Lovers	Joel	
2017	Princess Cyd	Tab	
2017	King Rat	Anthony Dignan	
2020	Hum	David Parker	

=== Television ===
Year	Title	Role	Notes
2004	Searching for David's Heart	Bennie	Television film
2012	Coco & Ruby	Leo	Episode: "Draft Dodgers"
2012	Boss	Miller's Assistant	2 episodes
2012	NCIS	Adam Horne	Episode: "Shell Shock: Part II"
2013	Zombieland	Columbus	Unaired pilot
2013	Major Crimes	Matt Brand	Episode: "Boys Will Be Boys"
2013	Crash & Bernstein	Tad Chamberlain	Episode: "Frat Chance"
2014	The Killing	Kyle Stansbury	6 episodes
2015	Battle Creek	Casey	Episode: "Sympathy for the Devil"
2018, 2019	9-1-1	Brandon Skinner	2 episodes
2019	What/If	Franklin	5 episodes
2020	FBI: Most Wanted	Gabriel Clark	Episode: "Ironbound"
