= Malindi Fickle =

American film director

- Citizenship: United States
- Occupation(s): Actress, Filmmaker, Editor, Producer, Writer
- Years active: 1992–present
- Spouse: Jason Brand
- Children: 3

Malindi Fickle is an actor and director who was based in New York City but now resides in Honolulu, Hawaii. She graduated from New York University in 2002. She began her acting career in the independent film Eyes of the Prey, later transitioning to directing with her 2006 debut, By The People.

== Early life ==
Malindi Fickle's favorite film is Paper Moon, which she first watched with her father at the age of nine.

== Career ==
Fickle started out in the New York theatre scene where she was a director and actor. She studied acting at The School for Film & Television and Michael Howard Studios. Her early career began with a small role as an extra in the courtroom scenes of Eyes of the Prey. She landed her first lead role as Megan in Jacklight, followed by performances in Everything Relative and St. Andrew's Girls.

Fickle made her directorial debut with By the People, a PBS documentary about the 2004 presidential election. She founded the company Hyperbaric Productions to produce the documentary. Her next project, Suck it Up Buttercup (2014) was a drama about drug addiction. The production of Suck it Up Buttercup was filmed over 28 days followed two years of editing. Fickle was nominated for five awards at the Hoboken International Film Festival, winning Best of the Festival - Jury Award.

== Personal life ==
Malindi Fickle lives in Honolulu with her family. She has also lived in New York City, where she started her career in theatre and based her company, and in Tokyo, Japan, for two separate periods. She is married to Jason Brand, a financial executive and has three children.

== Filmography ==
Year	Title	Credited as	Genre
1992	Eyes of the Prey	unnamed extra	Drama/Thriller
1995	Jacklight	Megan	Drama
1996	Everything Relative	Candy	Drama
2003	St. Andrew's Girls	Jennifer	Comedy/Horror
2006	By The People	Director/Editor/Producer	Documentary
2014	Suck it Up Buttercup	Director/Editor/Producer/Writer	Drama/Family
