= The Green (film) =

- The Green poster
- Directed by: Steven Williford
- Screenplay by: Paul Marcarelli
- Story by: Paul Marcarelli; Steven Williford
- Produced by: Steven Williford; Paul Marcarelli; Molly Pearson
- Starring: Jason Butler Harner; Cheyenne Jackson; Illeana Douglas; Julia Ormond
- Cinematography: Ryan Samul
- Edited by: Phillip J. Bartell
- Music by: William Brittelle
- Production company: Table Ten Films
- Distributed by: Cinetic Media; Wolfe Video
- Release date: April 30, 2011 (USA Film Festival)
- Running time: 90 minutes
- Country: United States
- Language: English

The Green is a 2011 drama film directed by Steven Williford, written by Williford, Paul Marcarelli and Molly Pearson, and starring Jason Butler Harner, Cheyenne Jackson, Illeana Douglas and Julia Ormond.

== Plot ==
Michael Gavin and his partner Daniel trade the rat race of New York City for the idyllic charm of the Connecticut shoreline, with hopes of a simpler life and time for Michael to finish his first novel. All that changes when one of Michael's high school students accuses him of 'inappropriate conduct', and the town rushes to judgment.

== Cast ==
- Jason Butler Harner as Michael Gavin
- Cheyenne Jackson as Daniel
- Illeana Douglas as Trish
- Julia Ormond as Karen
- Christopher Bert as Jason
- Karen Young as Janette
- Clayton Fox as Brad
- Bill Sage as Leo

== Production ==
The movie wss filmed on location in Guilford, Connecticut.
