= Earthling (film) =

- Movie poster
- Directed by: Clay Liford
- Written by: Clay Liford
- Starring: Rebecca Spence Peter Greene William Katt
- Cinematography: Jason Croft
- Edited by: Clay Liford
- Music by: Curtis Heath
- Production companies: Well Tailored Films; Zero Trans Fat Productions
- Release dates: March 2010 (SXSW); March 14, 2011
- Country: United States
- Language: English

Earthling is a 2010 sci-fi film by Clay Liford starring Rebecca Spence, Peter Greene and William Katt.

== Synopsis ==
After a mysterious atmospheric event, a small group of people wake up to realize that their entire lives have been a lie. They are, in fact, aliens disguised as humans. Now they have to make a choice: live amongst men, or try to find a way home.

== Cast ==
- Rebecca Spence as Judith
- Peter Greene as Swinnert
- William Katt as Ryan Donnelly
- Jennifer Shakeshaft as Joy (credited as Jennifer Sipes)
- Saxon Sharbino as Young Joy
- Savanna Sears as Maris
- Matt Socia as Sean
- Amelia Turner as Abby
- Gail Cronauer as Isabel
- Harry Goaz as Thomas Head
