= Audrey the Trainwreck =

- Film poster
- Directed by: Frank V. Ross
- Written by: Frank V. Ross
- Produced by: Adam Donaghey
- Starring: Joe Swanberg; Kurt Naebig; Nick Offerman; Jess Weixler; Rebecca Spence
- Cinematography: David Lowery
- Edited by: Frank V. Ross
- Music by: John Medeski
- Production company: Zero Trans Fat Productions
- Release date: March 17, 2010 (SXSW)
- Running time: 85 minutes
- Country: United States
- Language: English

Audrey the Trainwreck is a 2010 American romantic comedy-drama film directed by Frank V. Ross and starring Joe Swanberg, Kurt Naebig, Nick Offerman, Jess Weixler and Rebecca Spence.

== Plot ==
The film is the story of two people caught in the routines of work and circles of friends. The days begin with an alarm and ends with the fading sound of a television. Ron Hogan, a 28 year old ATM parts purchaser, and Stacy Ryan, a 27 year old, oddly charming courier, meet through a match making Internet service and go through the routine of falling for one another.

== Cast ==
- Anthony J. Baker as Ron Hogan
- Alexi Wasser as Stacy Ryan
- Joe Swanberg as Jeremy Roth
- Danny Rhodes as Scott Kaniewski
- Ivory Tiffin as Darci Stanton
- Kurt Naebig as Tim Hagan
- Allison Latta as Drunk Girl
- Jennifer Knox as Jenny the Bride
- Nick Offerman as David George
- Jess Weixler as Tammy
- Rebecca Spence as Kate Meyers

== Reception ==
Adam Keleman of Slant Magazine awarded the film three stars out of four.
