= Henry Gamble's Birthday Party =

- Theatrical release poster
- Directed by: Stephen Cone
- Written by: Stephen Cone
- Produced by: Stephen Cone; Bryan Hart; Laura Klein; Michael A. Leppen; Shane Simmons
- Starring: Cole Doman; Pat Healy; Joe Keery; Elizabeth Laidlaw; Nina Ganet; Tyler Ross; Francis Guinan; Hanna Dworkin; Meg Thalken
- Cinematography: Jason Chiu
- Edited by: Stephen Cone (uncredited)
- Music by: Page Campbell; Daniel Donahue; Heather McIntosh
- Distributed by: Wolfe Video
- Release date: May 7, 2015
- Running time: 87 minutes
- Country: United States
- Language: English

Henry Gamble's Birthday Party is a 2015 American drama film written and directed by Stephen Cone.

== Plot ==
Henry Gamble is a closeted teenager and active member of a church youth group. The film begins the night before his 17th birthday party. During a sleepover, he and his friend Gabe masturbate together while discussing a girl who will be at the party the next day. The next morning, the boys join the rest of the Gamble family for breakfast.

The party guests arrive and the film cuts between various storylines going on amongst them. Most of the party guests are members of the same church congregation, with the exception of some of Henry's school friends. One of the adult guests brings wine. Some of the adults are initially opposed to the wine, but by the end of the party most of them are either tipsy or drunk.

Bob Gamble is the patriarch of the family and head preacher of their church. Kat Gamble is the matriarch and also plays an active role in the church leadership. Their marriage is strained as Kat has had an affair (with deceased church leader – and Ricky's father – "H.B.") and is uncertain if she still has romantic feelings towards Bob. Despite Bob's forgiveness, and hope that they've overcome their differences, by the end of the film Kat tells Bob that she wants a break in the marriage, and that she intends on temporarily moving outside of their house. Kat encourages Bob to use their time apart to strengthen his relationship with Henry, and to accept their son's homosexuality.

Autumn, the elder Gamble child, is a freshman at a Christian college. She struggles with the loss of her virginity to her ex-boyfriend. Although it was a mutual decision to have sex, she feels a crisis of faith as a result of having sex before marriage. By the end of the film, she has reconciled her conflicted feelings and gets back together with her boyfriend.

Ricky is an unwelcome party guest and member of the church congregation, who may have attempted suicide in the recent past. He wishes to resume his duties as a camp chaperone for the church's annual summer camp, but church leadership is uncomfortable with this due partly to rumors of an incident from the previous year. Ricky was allegedly showering with some of the teenagers and they noticed he had an erection, prompting the kids to complain to the church. Feeling shunned and shut out by many of the party goers, Ricky goes to the bathroom and has a nervous breakdown. He then takes a razor and severely lacerates his face, prompting his mother and various party guests to take him to hospital.

Two of Henry’s non-churchgoing friends, Christine and Heather, comment on the perspectives of their peers while also showing concern for Logan and Ricky.

Party guest Logan has unreciprocated romantic feelings for Henry. Throughout the party Henry is relatively cold towards Logan, and it becomes clearer that many of the other guests have been casually bullying him at school. Becoming more attuned to the hypocrisy and conflicting feelings he is surrounded by, at the end of the party Henry asks Logan to spend the night. Henry and Logan lie in bed together, and Henry apologizes for not being more supportive and friendly during the school year. Henry then asks Logan if he wants to kiss, to which Logan says yes.

== Cast ==
- Cole Doman as Henry Gamble
- Pat Healy as Bob Gamble
- Elizabeth Laidlaw as Kat Gamble
- Nina Ganet as Autumn Gamble
- Tyler Ross as Aaron
- Francis Guinan as Larry Montgomery
- Hanna Dworkin as Bonnie Montgomery
- Darci Nalepa as Grace Montgomery
- Patrick Andrews as Ricky Matthews
- Meg Thalken as Rose Matthews
- Kelly O'Sullivan as Candice Noble
- Travis Knight as Keith Noble
- Daniel Kyri as Logan
- Joe Keery as Gabe
- Mia Hulen as Emily
- Jack Ball as Jon
- Melanie Neilan as Christine
- Grace Melon as Heather
- Spencer Curnutt as Cooper
- Zoe Tyson as Cheyenne

== Production ==
The film had a principal production schedule of 18 days.

== Release ==
The film was premiered on May 7, 2015 at the Maryland Film Festival. The film later premiered in New York City at the BAMcinemaFest on June 25, 2015.

=== Home media ===
On September 8, 2015, it was reported that Wolfe Video had acquired the rights to Henry Gamble's Birthday Party with plans to distribute the film on VOD and DVD in early 2016.

== Reception ==
=== Critical response ===
Henry Gamble's Birthday Party received a generally positive response from critics. As of June 2023, the film holds an 86% approval rating on the review aggregator Rotten Tomatoes, based on 14 reviews with an average rating of 6.6/10. On Metacritic, the film has a score of 59 out of 100, based on 4 critics, indicating "mixed or average" reviews.

Frank Scheck of The Hollywood Reporter described the film as a "somewhat less successful" work than Cone's similarly themed 2011 film The Wise Kids, but nevertheless lauded, "The film works best in its quieter moments, especially in its touching climactic scene in which Henry, sensitively portrayed by Doman in his film debut, finally allows himself to act on his suppressed impulses. It adds a welcome hopeful note to the preceding turmoil, reminding us yet again that the heart inevitably wants what it wants." Carson Kohler of Vox also praised the film, writing, "There are so many substantial issues that this birthday party illuminates. Sexuality. The church. Sexuality and the church. And that's one line of the issues." Joe Ehrman-Dupre of IndieWire praised the film as "miraculous" and wrote:

"It's very difficult for me to hate people," Stephen Cone tells me, and I believe him. If he were a vengeful writer, or an angry director—if he didn't care so damn much about each and every one of his characters—this "Birthday Party" would quickly devolve into stereotypical zealot madness. As it stands, though, Henry Gamble has surrounded himself with complex, difficult, frustrated people. Essentially, people with stories, just like you and me.

Ben Kenigsberg The New York Times gave the film a more mixed review, however, describing Cone as "not a sophisticated writer" and remarking, "Henry Gamble's Birthday Party feels sincere but not accomplished, empathetic but not deep."

=== Accolades ===
The film was awarded the SHOUT Jury Award and the Audience Narrative Award at the 2015 Sidewalk Moving Picture Festival.
