= Natalie West =

American actress

- Occupation: Actress
- Years active: 1988–present

Natalie West is an American television, film and stage actress best known for her role as Crystal Anderson-Conner on the 1988–2018 TV series Roseanne.

== Career ==
West's career began in the early 1980s when she starred in several plays in Chicago area theaters. Her major break came when she won the role of Crystal Anderson Conner, Roseanne's friend and, later, Dan's stepmother, on Roseanne. She was a regular cast member for seasons three and four and a recurring guest star before and afterward. Her final appearance was in the season eight premiere in 1995. Soon after she took a hiatus from film and television to focus on her stage career. She appeared in the 2018 revival of the show with also renewed for eleventh season. However, on May 29, 2018, in the wake of controversial remarks made by Barr on Twitter regarding Valerie Jarrett (an advisor of former president Barack Obama), ABC cancelled the revival after a single season.

In 2004, she acted in the independent film Life Sentence. She later appeared in a few more independent films over the years. In 2012, she starred in her first leading film role in the independent comedy-drama film Nate & Margaret, playing Margaret. She has continued to perform in several Chicago theatre productions including with A Red Orchid Theatre where she is an ensemble member.

Her films include Bushwhacked (1995), Life Sentence (2004) The Poker House (2007) and Nate & Margaret (2012).

== Awards ==
- 1984 – Joseph Jefferson Award for Actress in a Supporting Role in a Play for Life and Limb at the Wisdom Bridge Theatre in Chicago
- 2010 – Joseph Jefferson Award for Actress in a Supporting Role in a Play for Abigail's Party at A Red Orchid Theatre in Chicago
- 2012 – Equity Joseph Jefferson Award for Actress in a Supporting Role in a Play for The Butcher of Baraboo at A Red Orchid Theatre in Chicago

== Filmography ==
=== Film ===
Year	Title	Role	Notes
1995	Bushwhacked	Mrs. Fishman	
2004	Life Sentence	Louise	
2008	The Poker House	Dolly	
2012	Nate & Margaret	Margaret	
2020	Everything's Fine	Lauren	Short
2024	The Premiere	Mona	

=== Television ===
Year	Title	Role	Notes
1988–1995; 2018	Roseanne	Crystal Anderson	60 episodes
1989	Do You Know the Muffin Man?	Paula Stockman	TV movie
1993	Darkness Before Dawn	Mrs. Guard	TV movie
2010	Bad Sides	Herself	Episode: “Pilot”
2015	Under Covers	Camille	1 episode
2018; 2024	The Conners	Crystal Anderson	3 episodes
