= Lisa Wolpe =

American Shakespearian actress

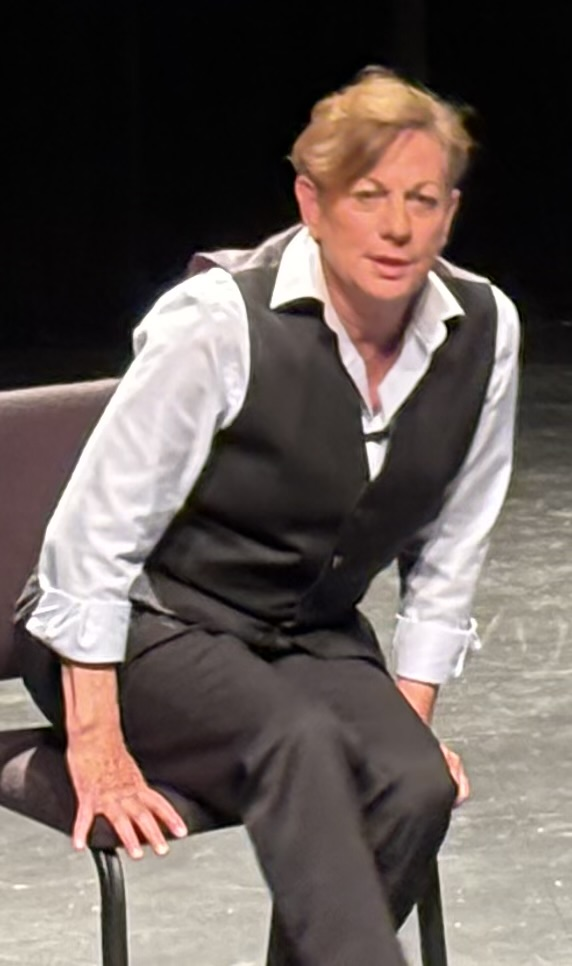
- Born: June 12, 1958 (age 68)
- Education: University of California, San Diego
- Occupations: Actor, theater producer
- Known for: Los Angeles Women's Shakespeare Collective
- Notable work: Solo show Shakespeare and the Alchemy of Gender
- Website: https://lisawolpe.org/

Lisa Wolpe (born 12 June, 1958) is an American actress who has specialized in playing male leading roles in the plays of William Shakespeare. In 1993, Wolpe established the Los Angeles Women's Shakespeare Company (LAWSC) in working as both actor and director. The LAWSC produced Shakespeare plays featuring all-female casts. Wolpe has acted in numerous theater productions of Shakespeare and other playwrights and in television and movies. In 2014, she has also created a solo show named Shakespeare and the Alchemy of Gender which is performed internationally. Wolpe is also an activist who uses theater and her unique background to promote the wellbeing of women and marginalized people in society.

== Education, early career, movies & television ==
Wolpe (pronounced "vol-pay") was born in Palo Alto, California. She grew up in Santa Rosa after the deaths of her parents. Wolpe attended the University of California at San Diego and studied journalism.

Wolpe's Jewish father, Hans Wolpe, committed suicide when she was a baby. His family had all been murdered in the Holocaust. Later, Wolpe's mother, suffering from multiple sclerosis, would also commit suicide. Lisa was adopted by her maternal grandmother and raised as a Catholic. She would eventually connect to her Jewish family living in America.

At the university she was mentored by theater director Alan Schneider. In 1981, after obtaining her degree in theater and journalism, Wolpe lived in New York for ten years and worked as a cinematographer and director. Wolpe had also married David Max Steinberg, and they made the 1989 movie Severance together. Wolpe and Steinberg divorced after 12 years of marriage.

Her 1985 play Parzival won the San Diego Theatre Critics Circle Awards for best new play.

Wolpe produced and starred in the 1989 film Severance. She played a supporting role in the 2010 film A Marine Story which dramatized the effects of the U.S. military's "don't ask, don't tell" policy concerning gay and lesbian soldiers. Wolpe was a guest star on the television program L.A. Law in November, 1989.

== Los Angeles Women's Shakespeare Company ==
In 1993, after her divorce, Wolpe moved to Los Angeles and started the Los Angeles Women's Shakespeare Company (LAWSC). Wolpe had already played her first male Shakespeare role, Malvolio, in "Twelfth Night" and she would go on to, in her own words, play more male Shakespeare roles than any other female actor. As of 2001, Wolpe was serving as the artistic and producing director for the LAWSC and she would continue in this capacity until 2010.

Wolpe justified an all-female Shakespeare troupe by referring back to the original Elizabethan practice of all-male productions and that Shakespeare often created "gender bending" characters.

Movie and television actresses have performed in the Los Angeles Women's Shakespeare Collective, people such as Lynn Redgrave, Susan Ruttan, Sharon Gless, Rue McClanahan, and Gates McFadden. The LAWSC was proclaimed as "one of the ten coolest things to do in Los Angeles" by Los Angeles Magazine.

Marking the company's twentieth anniversary, and its last production, was a 2013 all-woman staging of Hamlet at The Odyssey Theater in Los Angeles in which Volpe played the fabled lead character. Wolpe's work with LAWSC has drawn honors such as the 2008 L.A. Drama Critics Circle Margaret Harford Award for Sustained Excellence and a 2014 Lee Melville "outstanding contribution" award from the Los Angeles Playwright's Arena.

In 2005, while working on her master's thesis, Wolpe and the LAWSC produced an all-female production of The Merchant of Venice in which she played Shylock. As a victim of antisemitism, the Shylock role led Wolpe to a greater understanding of the spread of intolerance and discrimination and helped provide a link to her Jewish background represented by her father's family. This work would lead to Wolpe's solo show Shakespeare and the Alchemy of Gender.

== Shakespeare and the Alchemy of Gender ==
In 2007, Wolpe obtained her M.F.A in theater and interdisciplinary art from Goddard College and her one-woman show, Shakespeare and the Alchemy of Gender, grew out of work that she performed for her degree. After graduation, Wolpe received a grant that enabled her to spend a month writing the show. She first performed it at the Provincetown, Massachusetts Women's Theater Festival clocking in at just under two-and-a-half hours without intermission. Wolpe later edited the show down to 90 minutes and eventually one hour.

Shakespeare and the Alchemy of Gender blends aspects of Wolpe and her Jewish family's history along with her favorite parts from Shakespeare. The show is dedicated to her father, Hans Wolpe, who fought Nazis and later became an academic in America. Hans Wolpe's family was killed at Auschwitz, and he committed suicide when Lisa was age four. According to Wolpe, she contemplated the ghost of her father while performing excerpts from Shakespeare in her show, and, according to one critic, the search for her father was a means of catharsis.

Wolpe performed Shakespeare and the Alchemy of Gender for the Verona, Italy Shakespeare Fringe Festival in 2023. In statements published in the Verona River News, Wolpe said that "there is a huge crackdown on intelligence in the United States. They have defunded education, banning people from reading books; there are television stations that tell lies; and now they are erasing Shakespeare in many places." Wolpe also referred to the apparent banning of Shakespeare in a Miami, Florida school district.

Wolpe, an "acknowledged expert in cross-gender performance" performed the lead character for the New Haven Elm Shakespeare Company's production of Richard III in August 2024. Wolpe's Richard was done in Elizabethan costume without props, crutches, or affectations. Wolpe had also performed Shakespeare and the Alchemy of Gender for the Elm Shakespeare Company earlier in 2024.

== Teaching & outreach ==
In 2015, Wolpe established the TranShakespeare workshop and worked in collaboration with King's College, London and the Young Vic theater. Goals of the project were "re-gendering, gender blending, and cross-gendering of Shakespeare internationally." The two-week workshop involved the efforts of around 36 directors, dramaturgs, and actors.

During the "pandemic year," Wolpe taught, acted, and directed Shakespeare in more than twenty universities and festivals including Boston University, the University of Arizona, the Great River Shakespeare Festival, and the Prague Shakespeare Company.

In 2026, Wolpe's work will be archived within the Shakespeare Institute in Stratford to help honor a year devoted to "Shakespeare's Sisters".

== See also ==
- Cross-gender acting
- A Marine Story
