= Andrew Hafitz =

American film editor

- Occupation: Film editor

Andrew Hafitz is an American film editor whose notable works include The Last Days of Disco and Naz & Maalik.

== Education ==
He graduated from Yale University in 1984.

== Filmography ==
- Naz & Maalik (2015)
- Damsels in Distress (2012)
- Chapter 27 (2007)
- Tonight at Noon (2006)
- Keane (2004),
- Ken Park (2002)
- Bully (2001)
- Reveille (2001)
- The Lifestyle (1999)
- The Last Days of Disco (1998)
