= The Lovers (2017 film) =

Film by Azazel Jacobs

- Theatrical release poster
- Directed by: Azazel Jacobs
- Written by: Azazel Jacobs
- Produced by: Ben LeClair; Chris Stinson
- Starring: Debra Winger; Tracy Letts; Aidan Gillen; Melora Walters; Tyler Ross; Jessica Sula
- Cinematography: Tobias Datum
- Edited by: Darrin Navarro
- Music by: Mandy Hoffman
- Production company: A24
- Distributed by: A24
- Release dates: April 22, 2017 (Tribeca); May 5, 2017 (United States)
- Running time: 94 minutes
- Country: United States
- Language: English
- Box office: $2.2 million

The Lovers is a 2017 American romantic comedy film written and directed by Azazel Jacobs. It stars Debra Winger, Tracy Letts, Aidan Gillen, Melora Walters, Tyler Ross, and Jessica Sula.

It had its world premiere at the Tribeca Film Festival on April 22, 2017. It was released on May 5, 2017, by A24.

== Plot ==
Mary and Michael are a married couple. They live together, but are estranged from one another. They are both having long-standing extramarital affairs—she with Robert and he with Lucy. Their lovers have both emphatically demanded they break up the marriage and Mary and Michael have vowed that they will do so after a visit from their son, Joel, and his new girlfriend, Erin.

This plan goes awry, however, when an early-morning kiss between Mary and Michael leads to sex. They find themselves falling in love again and having passionate sexual encounters. Simultaneously, their respective lovers become more and more needy and demanding, which makes them less appealing to Mary and Michael.

On the train to see his parents, Joel warns Erin that their marriage is a failed one and that his parents are horrible people. He is immediately tense and wary when he enters their house, but is surprised to find his parents acting lovingly toward one another. He begins to think they may have changed.

Mary's and Michael's lovers become increasingly agitated. Robert is the first to confront his rival, telling Michael in a grocery store that Mary is going to leave him. Then, Lucy approaches Mary in her car and hisses at her. These confrontations cause the renewed rapport between Mary and Michael and their son to fall apart. Mary leaves the house for several hours and cries in her car. Joel's anger boils over and he punches a hole in a wall.

When Mary returns to the house, Joel storms out, after crying in Erin's arms. Mary and Michael do not appear to be upset with each other, but the next scene shows them packing their belongings to depart the house. Following scenes show Mary at Robert's house and Michael at Lucy's.

However, the film ends with Michael phoning Mary and telling her, "I can't stop thinking about you."

== Cast ==
- Debra Winger as Mary
- Tracy Letts as Michael
- Aidan Gillen as Robert
- Melora Walters as Lucy
- Tyler Ross as Joel
- Jessica Sula as Erin

== Production ==
On April 20, 2016, it was reported that A24 would finance and distribute the Azazel Jacobs film The Lovers, with Debra Winger and Tracy Letts in negotiations to star. Filming reportedly concluded on May 27, 2016, after more than a month of shooting in and around the Santa Clarita Valley.

== Release ==
It had its world premiere at the Tribeca Film Festival on April 22, 2017. The film was released on May 5, 2017. Sony Pictures Worldwide Acquisitions acquired international distribution rights to the film.

== Reception ==
=== Critical response ===
The Lovers received positive reviews from film critics. It holds an 81% approval rating on review aggregator website Rotten Tomatoes, based on 113 reviews, with a weighted average of 6.8/10. The site's critical consensus reads, "With appealing leads and a narrative approach that offers a fresh perspective on familiar themes, The Lovers tells a quietly absorbing story with unexpected emotional resonance." On Metacritic, the film holds a rating of 76 out of 100, based on 31 critics, indicating "generally favorable reviews.

== Indian remake ==
On April 19, 2024, a remake of The Lovers, Do Aur Do Pyaar, told from a different perspective and different culture, was released in theaters across India. This production also marks the first remake of an A24 film.
