= The Poker House =

2008 film

- Theatrical release poster
- Directed by: Lori Petty
- Screenplay by: Lori Petty; David Alan Grier
- Story by: Lori Petty
- Produced by: Stephen J. Cannell; Michael Dubelko
- Starring: Selma Blair; Jennifer Lawrence; Bokeem Woodbine; Chloë Grace Moretz; David Alan Grier; Sophi Bairley
- Cinematography: Ken Seng
- Edited by: Tirsa Hackshaw
- Music by: Mike Post
- Distributed by: Phase 4 Films
- Release date: September 29, 2008 (limited release)
- Running time: 93 minutes
- Country: United States
- Language: English

The Poker House, subsequently retitled as Behind Closed Doors, is a 2008 American independent drama film written and directed by Lori Petty, in her directorial debut. Based on Petty's early life during the 1970s, the film depicts a painful day in the life of Agnes (Jennifer Lawrence), a teenage girl who is raising her two younger sisters, Bee (Sophi Bairley) and Cammie (Chloë Grace Moretz), in their mother's whorehouse.

At the Los Angeles Film Festival, Lawrence won an Outstanding Performance Award for her performance.

== Plot ==
Sarah, a woman addicted to alcohol and drugs, is the mother of three abused and neglected daughters, 14-year-old Agnes, 12-year-old Bee, and 8-year-old Cammie. She has been coerced into prostitution to support her pimp, Duval. Sarah is unable to care for the girls, forcing Agnes to take responsibility for her two younger sisters. Sarah's house has become known as the Poker House, where neighborhood pimps and criminals gather to play poker, as well as buying sex.

Agnes believes Duval is her boyfriend and that he loves her, despite being much older and his abuse towards her mother. Agnes wakes Bee and prepares her for her paper route. Cammie has stayed the night at her friend Sheila's house. It is revealed that before they left their father, who was a preacher, he used to beat Sarah and the girls. The four fled, and Sarah, struggling to take care of the girls on her own, became a prostitute after meeting Duval.

Bee speaks of moving into a foster home, hoping to be adopted. Cammie spends the day at a bar, making friends with Dolly, the bar owner, and Stymie, an alcoholic. Agnes rides through town, talking with a few friends, playing a game of basketball, and picking up a couple of paychecks from her part-time jobs. Towards the end of the day, Agnes climbs through Bee's window, avoiding the living room, which is full of gamblers, pimps, and drunks. Bee has locked herself in her room, and like Agnes, avoids the downstairs chaos. Agnes makes Bee leave the house, telling her not to come back for a while.

Later that evening after Duval and Agnes begin kissing, Duval then rapes her. As Duval releases her, she runs to the bathroom to clean herself, horrified by the thoughts of the violence and possibility of pregnancy. She is completely traumatized. Her mother enters the bathroom, and as Agnes reaches for her in utter distress, Sarah refuses to touch her, and instead tells Agnes to go to the store to pick up alcohol. Soon after, Agnes overhears Duval telling Sarah that he will begin pimping and selling Agnes. Agnes threatens to shoot Duval, firing a couple of shots and screaming to her mother that he raped her. Sarah tells Agnes that she will defend him.

Agnes, a school basketball star, scores 27 points in the second half alone, a record that lasts for years to come. However, she falls when she scores the final basket (field goal), limps to the car, and has a meltdown. She then drives off and finds Bee and Cammie at a nearby bridge. The two get in the car, with Agnes not telling her young sisters of events that took place that evening, and instead takes them to get dinner. Cammie then plays "Ain't No Mountain High Enough", and the three girls sing together.

Agnes later leaves Iowa to go to New York and become an actress and artist. Some 20 years later, she is shown to have directed the movie, revealing the movie is the true story of director Lori Petty's childhood.

== Cast ==
- Jennifer Lawrence as Agnes
- Selma Blair as Sarah
- Chloë Grace Moretz as Cammie
- Bokeem Woodbine as Duval
- David Alan Grier as Stymie
- Danielle Campbell as Darla
- Sophi Bairley as Bee
- Casey Tutton as Sheila
- Natalie West as Dolly

Jennifer Lawrence's father, Gary Lawrence, appears uncredited in the film as the basketball coach of the other team.

== Reception ==
On the review aggregator website Rotten Tomatoes, 63% of 8 critics' reviews are positive.

In a negative review on Variety, Peter Debruge wrote that, "overall, the pacing feels languid to the point of meandering, relying too heavily on old soul records (...) for momentum and energy." In the Los Angeles Times, Kevin Thomas rated it 4/5, writing that the film "has a ring of truth about it strong enough to sustain a defy-all-odds finish."

Stephen Farber of The Hollywood Reporter wrote that, "while the film has strong moments and performances, it illustrates the dangers of overly personal filmmaking and misses the clarity that a true artist would provide." John Wheeler of LA Weekly described it as "one of the most personal, wounded films in years. That it is also one of the most confused reflects how deeply it springs from the psyche of its director."
