= The Guest House =

2012 film by Michael Baumgarten

- Film poster
- Directed by: Michael Baumgarten
- Written by: Michael Baumgarten
- Produced by: Michael Baumgarten
- Starring: Ruth Reynolds; Madeline Merritt
- Cinematography: Ankush Kohli
- Edited by: Jennifer Barlow
- Music by: Michael Reola
- Production company: Baumgarten Films
- Distributed by: Wolfe Releasing
- Release dates: June 18, 2012 (UK); September 4, 2012 (US)
- Running time: 82 min
- Country: United States
- Language: English
- Budget: $250,000

The Guest House is a 2012 lesbian romance film written, produced and directed by Michael Baumgarten. It stars Ruth Reynolds and Madeline Merritt as two women who fall in love over a weekend at a Los Angeles guest house. The film has received mixed reviews from critics.

== Plot ==
18-year-old Rachel arrives home one morning after staying out all night with her boyfriend Jason. Jason has decided to break up with Rachel since they have both just graduated from high school and are going off to college. She and Jason have an argument and he drives away in his car before Rachel goes inside her house and is scolded by her father for coming home so late. Right before he leaves on his business trip, he informs Rachel that a new employee at his company is coming over to stay in their guest house for a few days.

Amy, the new employee, arrives and Rachel shows her around the house and the guest house. Rachel plays a short original instrumental song on the piano and receives praise from Amy. Rachel tells Amy that the guest house used to be her mother’s art studio before she died from cancer. Later that day, as Amy prepares to take a bath, Rachel and her get to know each other, talking about travel and relationships. Rachel tells Amy about Jason breaking up with her and that she plans to go to college in New York. Later that night, Rachel opens up a bottle of wine for both her and Amy. They talk about love and relationships and Rachel asks Amy if she has ever been in love. Amy admits that she is not even sure what it means to be in love, and she also admits that she’s never been comfortable with men or with anyone. Later that night, Amy walks over to the main house and accidentally sees Rachel masturbating to a lesbian adult film. Amy walks back to the guest house without Rachel noticing.

The next morning, Rachel decides to take Amy out to shop and see the city. They document some of their activities that day on a video camera and talk about their hopes and dreams for their futures. Rachel mentions her desire to make music. While on a Ferris wheel at the beach, Rachel and Amy’s conversations get more personal, and Amy confesses that she thinks Rachel is cute. Amy then mentions that she feels like she and Rachel have become best friends. The girls return home and, having developed a strong connection, make love that night.

The next day, Rachel and Amy spend more time getting to know each other. They make love in the hot tub and afterwards go out to a concert at a small nightclub. The girls then go to a tattoo parlor to get tattoos. Later that night, Rachel gets out of bed, goes to the piano, and plays the same song she played for Amy, but this time with lyrics. Amy walks in and hears part of the performance. She then embraces Rachel.

The next morning, Rachel’s father arrives home early and is shocked to discover her in bed with Amy. To Rachel’s shock, it is revealed that her father and Amy slept with each other. Amy begs for forgiveness, telling Rachel that she didn’t know that there was such a thing as love. Disgusted and heartbroken, Rachel breaks off their relationship.

A few months later, Rachel is performing a show at a small club in San Francisco. Afterwards, she exits and finds Amy waiting outside. The two girls kiss and admit how much they have missed each other. They later walk by the water near Golden Gate Bridge, and Amy tells Rachel she loves her. Rachel tells Amy she loves her too. The two of them kiss and embrace.

== Cast ==
- Ruth Reynolds as Rachel
- Madeline Merritt as Amy
- Tom McCafferty as Frank
- Jake Parker as Jason
- Jennifer Barlow as Rachel's Mom

== Production ==
Madeline Merritt originally read for the role of Rachel before being cast as Amy. Neither she nor Reynolds had portrayed a lesbian character on screen prior to this film, though Merritt had previously starred in a stage production of Boston Marriage while at university. Reynolds found that their experience on-set mirrored that of their characters, saying, "It was a challenge because we are considered straight, so it was kind of cool to find out how comfortable it was to be with someone of the same gender...even though its something that’s completely new. So aside from our characters, we discovered it in real life as well". The two women became friends during filming. Merritt recalled, "When Ruth and I had callbacks, we read together and we just clicked. The chemistry and connection were just there: it wasn't something we had to work at, we really played well off of each other from the start." Reynolds also relished the opportunity to play a musician.

== Critical response ==
The Guest House received mixed reviews from critics. Writing for AfterEllen, Danielle Riendeau summed up her review by saying: "Guest House is largely a fun piece of fluff, with attractive leads and a fun premise, but the film is far, far too chatty for its own good. The writing is spotty, with a few clunky lines, and the final third dives far into melodramatic territory." However, she also noted the "fantastic chemistry between Reynolds and Merritt" and found the love scenes "decidedly hot". Dora Mortimer gave the film a negative review for Diva magazine and found that it lacked authenticity, saying: "If you're looking for a lesbian film – hunt elsewhere. This film's only claim to LGBT issues is having two very femmey members of the same sex feign interest in each other. It is written and directed by a man and it shows." Lauren Shiro of Curve magazine was much more positive, saying: "The Guest House is a cute, fun, and highly enjoyable movie. This is a perfect light-hearted, feel good movie for fun weekend entertainment."

Ruth Reynolds won the Rising Star Award at the Melbourne Independent Film Festival for her role in the film.

== Home media ==
The Guest House is distributed by Wolfe Releasing in the United States, and by Peccadillo Pictures in the United Kingdom.
