= Naz & Maalik =

- Directed by: Jay Dockendorf
- Written by: Jay Dockendorf
- Produced by: Jacob Albert; Margaret Katcher
- Starring: Curtiss Cook Jr.; Kerwin Johnson Jr.
- Cinematography: Jake Magee
- Edited by: Andrew Hafitz
- Music by: Adam Gunther
- Distributed by: Wolfe Video
- Release date: March 14, 2015 (SXSW)
- Running time: 89 minutes
- Country: United States
- Language: English

Naz & Maalik is a 2015 American drama film written and directed by Jay Dockendorf and starring Curtiss Cook Jr. and Kerwin Johnson Jr. It follows two closeted Muslim teenagers over the course of a summer afternoon, as their secretive behavior and small-time scheming accidentally lead them into the crosshairs of FBI surveillance.

The film had its world premiere at the South by Southwest Film Festival on March 14, 2015 and was acquired by Wolfe Releasing, which released it theatrically and on VOD in January 2016. The film was widely praised for its performances and received the Tribeca Film Institute's IWC Filmmaker Award in 2014.

== Plot ==
The film follows two high-school friends, Naz and Maalik, who spend a hot summer day bopping around Bedford–Stuyvesant hustling lottery tickets, as well as trying to make sense of their new—and highly secretive romantic—relationship. Over the course of the afternoon, the boys' petty—though illicit—small-time scheming, along with their secretive dashes into alleyways to kiss, sets a high-strung FBI operative named Sarah Mickell on their tail. Having observed the teens' erratic and mountingly tense behavior, Mickell worries these two may in fact be radicalized Muslims, and surveils them as they go through their day. Naz and Maalik's carefree afternoon starts to darken when they realize they've given Mickell different alibis and the boys begin to panic about being uncovered by their families.

== Cast ==
- Curtiss Cook Jr. as Maalik
- Kerwin Johnson Jr. as Naz
- Annie Grier as Sarah Mickell
- Ashleigh Awusie as Cala
- Anderson Footman as Dan

== Production ==
=== Development ===
Jay Dockendorf was inspired to write the screenplay for Naz & Maalik after befriending a Muslim man with whom he was sharing a sublet, and interviewing him about the experience of hiding his sexuality from his family. At the same time as Dockendorf began outlining the script, the FBI's program of secret spying on mosques in Brooklyn was coming to light, prompting Dockendorf to incorporate the theme of surveillance into the story.

Once the two leads were cast, the characters continued to evolve, with Dockendorf, Johnson and Cook spending entire days together for three weeks, walking together through the city and running through the characters’ conversations, trajectories, and inner lives.

After raising $37,000 on Kickstarter in 2013 and shooting most of the film over the summer, Dockendorf and his producers, Jacob Albert and Margaret Katcher, received the Tribeca Film Institute IWC Schaffehausen Filmmaker Award on the strength of a rough cut, which was reviewed by a jury chaired by producer Paula Weinstein.

=== Filming ===
Principal photography for the film occurred over 30 days – beginning on August 21, 2013 – and took place in various neighborhoods around Brooklyn, including Fort Greene, Bedford-Stuyvesant, Clinton Hill, and Crown Heights.

Many of the performances in the film were heavily improvised, as Dockendorf intended to give the film a conversational, comfortable, meandering feel. “Do the Right Thing,” “She's Gotta Have It,” “Paris Is Burning,” and “The Wedding Banquet” have been noted as influences.

== Distribution ==
The film was picked up for release by Wolfe Video shortly after its premiere at SXSW. It was released theatrically in New York on January 22, 2016.

=== Release ===
Naz & Maalik had its world premiere on March 14, 2015, at the South by Southwest Film Festival in Austin, Texas. The film then premiered at Outfest in Los Angeles, on July 12, 2014, where the film was lauded as a “striking debut” and its two leads took home the top acting prize for their "richly multi-dimensional portraits of young gay men balancing their forbidden relationship with their Muslim faith in post 9-11 New York."

It won the Best Feature Film prize at the 2015 Seattle LGBT Film Festival.

The film has screened at over 40 festivals worldwide.

As of spring 2020, the movie is streaming on Hulu.

== Reception ==
Critical reactions to the film have been largely positive, praising the project for its rich acting, its lean and buoyant directing, and its vibrant, city-life inspired cinematography. FilmIndependent included Naz & Maalik on its list of Don't Miss Indies to see in January, calling it "one of the year’s most acclaimed, award-winning LGBT films.”

Writing in TwitchFilm after the film's SXSW premiere, Jeremy Harris praised the film's “delightful cinematic chemistry” and the film's energy and exuberance. The Hollywood Reporter praised the film after it screened at OutFest, noting its youthful vitality and the charm of its improvised performances. The Austin Chronicle commended the film for the nuance and complexity of its characters, noting that “original stories about underrepresented characters are hard to come by these days, and Naz & Maalik succeeds at not just finding a niche, but rising above the clever concept and delivering a powerful treatise on what it is to be young and disenfranchised in New York City.” Ain’t It Cool found the film "both enlightening and touching […] not your usual love story, and a good one to boot.”

Writing in The Playlist (Indiewire), Katie Walsh gave the film a B+, praising Dockendorf's directing and especially the film's performances: "In addition to Dockendorf’s ability with storytelling and style, much praise must be paid to newcomers Cook and Johnson as the lead duo. They feel so at ease on screen, and vacillate between romance, best buds, and lover’s quarrels. They code switch between devout Muslims, urban teens, and gay youth, constantly measuring how to present their identities to the world and to each other. Johnson, particularly, is a soulful presence, with his struggle and anger bubbling constantly under the surface. A refreshing and relevant cinematic representation, “Naz & Maalik” is an impressive debut for filmmaker and actors.”

On RogerEbert.com, Sheila O'Malley gave the film 2 1/2 stars, finding an assortment of praiseworthy elements in the film, particularly in regard to the depiction of the relationship between Naz and Maalik, but also commenting that "[t]he editing (by Andy Hafitz) is sometimes awkward, keeping in redundancies and scenes that don't reveal anything" and concluding "There are some very good individual sequences, ..., but the film doesn't hang together. ... With 'Naz & Malik', you can feel what should have been, but isn't."
