= Ellen McLaughlin =

American playwright and actress

- Born: November 9, 1957 (age 68); Cambridge, Massachusetts, U.S.
- Education: Yale University (BA)
- Occupations: Playwright, actress

Ellen McLaughlin (born November 9, 1957) is an American playwright and actress.

== Early life ==
Born in Cambridge, Massachusetts on November 9, 1957, McLaughlin is the daughter of history professor Charles Capan McLaughlin and English professor and novelist Ann Landis. She received her BA from Yale University in 1980.

== Writing ==
In 1992, McLaughlin began adapting Greek plays, beginning with Electra, by Sophocles. For each adaptation, she reads as many English translations as possible, then begins to write her version. Each of her adaptations takes some liberties but retains the original play's basic structure.

Her plays include Septimus and Clarissa, Ajax in Iraq, The Trojan Women, Helen, The Persians, Oedipus, and The Oresteia.

== Acting ==
McLaughlin is also an actress, having worked extensively in theater. She originated the part of the Angel in Tony Kushner's Angels in America, appearing in every U.S. production from its earliest workshops through its Broadway run.

On Broadway, she acted in Angels in America: Perestroika (1993) and Angels in America: Millennium Approaches (1993). In 2023, McLaughlin appeared in the role of King Lear at the Colorado Shakespeare Festival in Boulder, Colorado.

McLaughlin's on-screen credits include Everything Relative, The Bed You Sleep In by Jon Jost, with guest appearances on Law & Order.

== Other professional activities ==
McLaughlin has taught playwriting in numerous venues, from Yale School of Drama to Princeton University. She has been teaching at Barnard College since 1995.

She is a member of New Dramatists and has served on the board of T.C.G.

Her most recent publication, by T.C.G., is The Greek Plays.

== Awards and honors ==
- Great American Play Contest
- The Susan Smith Blackburn Prize
- The NEA
- The Writer's Award from the Lila Wallace-Reader's Digest Fund
- The Berilla Kerr Award for Playwrighting
- NEA/TCG Theatre Residency Grant.
