= Tiger Tail in Blue =

- Directed by: Frank V. Ross
- Written by: Frank V. Ross
- Produced by: Adam Donaghey; Drew Durepos
- Starring: Frank V. Ross; Rebecca Spence
- Cinematography: Mike Gibisser
- Edited by: Frank V. Ross
- Music by: John Medeski; Chris Speed
- Production company: Zero Trans Fat Productions
- Release date: 17 November 2012 (Gotham Independent Film Awards)
- Running time: 76 minutes
- Country: United States
- Language: English

Tiger Tail in Blue is a 2012 American drama film directed by Frank V. Ross, starring Ross and Rebecca Spence.

== Cast ==
- Frank V. Ross as Christopher
- Rebecca Spence as Melody
- Megan Mercier as Brandy
- Robert Airdo as Bob
- Anthony J. Baker as Leonard
- Allison Latte as Ms. Knowitall
- Matt Sherlock as Dude

== Reception ==
Peter Sobczynski of the Chicago Sun-Times wrote that the film is "infinitely more interesting and watchable than most of its lo-fi brethren and fully deserving of the praise that it has already received in indie film circles", and praised the performances of Ross and Spence, as well as Ross's direction.

Ray Pride of Newcity Film wrote that the "keenly observant Tiger Tail, demonstrates well the gently idiosyncratic voice heard in earlier films like Audrey the Trainwreck."

Eric Kohn of IndieWire wrote that the film is "delicately scripted to give the perception of building up to some kind of climax, to the point where even when it arrives at an obvious twist, the subtlety of reactions infuse the material with surprising depth."
