= American Milkshake =

- Directed by: David Andalman; Mariko Munro
- Written by: David Andalman; Mariko Munro
- Produced by: David Andalman; Mariko Munro
- Starring: Tyler Ross; Shareeka Epps; Georgia Ford; Eshan Bay; Leo Fitzpatrick; Danny Burstein
- Cinematography: Ian Bloom
- Music by: Kieran Magzul
- Production company: SModcast Pictures
- Distributed by: Phase 4 Films
- Release date: January 20, 2013 (Sundance Film Festival)
- Running time: 82 minutes
- Country: United States
- Language: English
- Budget: $1.4 million
- Box office: $44,687

American Milkshake is a 2013 American black comedy film written, produced, and directed by David Andalman and Mariko Munro, starring Tyler Ross, Shareeka Epps, Georgia Ford, Eshan Bay, Leo Fitzpatrick and Danny Burstein.

== Plot ==
In the mid-1990s, Jolie Jolson, a white high school student (the great-grandson of blackface performer Al Jolson) wants to be on the basketball team because he thinks that it will bring him closer to being the one thing that he isn't: black. His African American girlfriend, Henrietta, is pregnant with another man's baby and had a seedy past which includes appearing in a sex tape. Jolie gets on the basketball team due to a large donation from his well-off father, and ends up dating one of the cheerleaders for the team, and accidentally impregnates her.

== Cast ==
- Tyler Ross as Jolie
- Shareeka Epps as Henrietta
- Georgia Ford as Christine
- Leo Fitzpatrick as Mr. McCarty
- Eshan Bay as Haroon
- Danny Burstein as Coach
- Nuri Hazzard as Arius
- Anna Friedman as Jeanette

== Release ==
The film premiered at the Sundance Film Festival on January 20, 2013 and was sold to Phase 4 Films and the Kevin Smith Movie Club for theatrical and day and date release and it also won the producer's award at US in Progress.

== Reception ==
On Rotten Tomatoes it has a rating of 0%, based on reviews from 7 critics, with an average rating of 3.9/10. On Metacritic the film has a score of 30 out of 100 based on 5 reviews, indicating "generally unfavorable" reviews.
