= Meg Thalken =

American actress

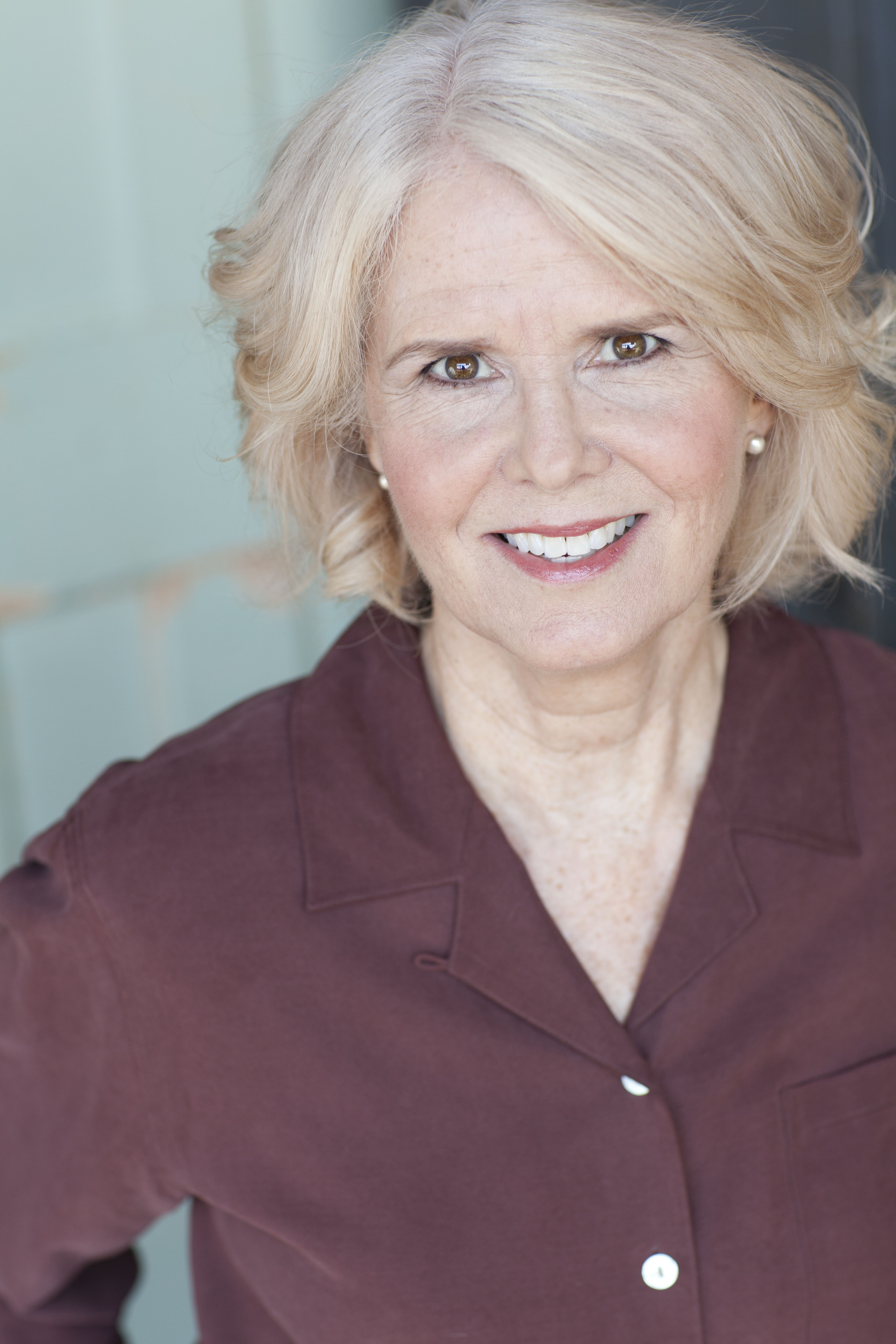
- Born: Margaret A Thalken; Washington, District of Columbia, U.S.
- Occupations: Stage actress Film actress Television actress
- Years active: 1982-present

Meg Thalken is an American stage, film and television actress, known to television viewers for her work on ER.

== Filmography ==
- Chicago Story (1 episode, 1982) (TV)
- Class (1983)
- Through Naked Eyes (1983) (TV Movie)
- Jack and Mike (1 episode, 1987)
- Poltergeist III (1988)
- The Babe (1992)
- The Untouchables (1 episode, 1993)
- A Family Thing (1996)
- Early Edition (1 episode, 1996)
- EZ Streets (2 episodes, 1996–1997)
- ER (7 episodes, 1996–2008)
- Chicago Hope (1 episode, 1997)
- U.S. Marshals (1998)
- Turks (1 episode, 1999)
- What About Joan (1 episode, 2001)
- Dragonfly (2002) (uncredited)
- Check Please (2007)
- Hannah Free (2009)
- Henry Gamble's Birthday Party (2015)

== Theater ==
- A Guide for the Perplexed (2010)

=== Reception ===
In their review of A Guide for the Perplexed, where Thalken had the role of Sheila, Variety wrote, "These are worthy, interesting characters, but the narrative never emerges from situation into story."
