= Kurt Naebig =

American actor

- Born: 1963 or 1964 (age 61–62); United States
- Education: Juilliard School (BFA)
- Occupation: Actor
- Website: www.kurtnaebig.com

Kurt Naebig (born 1963/1964) is an American actor who has made various appearances on ER, Prison Break, and made movie roles in Road to Perdition, The Relic, Henry: Portrait of a Serial Killer, and Howard Beach: Making a Case of a Murder. He also did voice acting in video games such as FreeSpace 2, Summoner, Oni, and Red Faction. He has recently worked on Witless Protection and The Express: The Ernie Davis Story. Kurt Naebig's career also includes voice over work (or voice acting) with Breathe Bible.

Naebig graduated from the Juilliard School, where he was a member of the Drama Division's of Group 19 (1986–1990). He also does many voiceovers in commercials.

== Filmography ==
Year	Title	Role	Notes
1986	Henry: Portrait of a Serial Killer	High School Jock	
1991	Cold Justice	John	
1992	Under Cover of Darkness		
1997	The Relic	Police Officer #3	
2002	Road to Perdition	Tenement Murderer	
2003	Oh! My Dear Desire	Joe	
2008	Witless Protection	Mark Bedell	
2008	The Express: The Ernie Davis Story	Reporter (Team Bus)	
2009	Public Enemies	Agent William Rorer	
2010	A Nightmare on Elm Street	Dean's Father	
2010	Audrey the Trainwreck	Tim Hagan	
2010	Detroit 1-8-7	"Slim" Hopkins	Episode: "Déjà Vu / All In"
2011	The Chicago Code	Bill Lindsey	Episode: "Pilot"
2012	Chicago Fire	Grogan	Episode: "Hanging On"
2014	Chicago P.D.	Lieutenant Bruce Belden	3 episodes
2015	Bloomin Mud Shuffle	Uncle	
2017	APB	Detective Karnes	Episode: "Hard Reset"
2017	Sense8	Jerry Patrell	Episode: "Who Am I?"
2017	Empire	Detective Lumley	Episode: "Full Circle"
2017	Chicago Fire	Calhoun	Episode: "An Even Bigger Surprise"
2018	Not Welcome	Zeke	
2019	The Red Line	O'Dwyer Kanman	Episode: "We Are Each Other's Harvest"
