= Nate & Margaret =

2012 American film by Nathan Adloff

- Theatrical release poster
- Directed by: Nathan Adloff
- Written by: Justin D.M. Palmer; Nathan Adloff
- Produced by: Nathan Adloff; Ash Christian
- Starring: Natalie West; Tyler Ross; Conor McCahill; Gaby Hoffmann
- Cinematography: Brian Levin
- Edited by: Brian Levin
- Music by: Kevin O'Donnell
- Production company: Cranium Entertainment
- Distributed by: Breaking Glass Pictures
- Release date: June 2012
- Running time: 80 minutes
- Country: United States
- Language: English

Nate & Margaret is a 2012 American film directed by Nathan Adloff, which he co-wrote with Justin D.M. Palmer, and co-produced with Ash Christian. It was filmed in Chicago, Illinois, and stars Natalie West, Tyler Ross, and Gaby Hoffmann. It features cinematography by Brian Levin, and is a Cranium Entertainment production. It was released by Breaking Glass Pictures in 2012 to American audiences in San Diego at FilmOut, Chicago and New York City, and in 2013 at the Queergestreift Filmfestival in Konstanz, Germany. The film received generally favourable reviews from critics.

== Plot ==
Nate, a 19-year-old film student, and Margaret, a 52-year-old waitress and aspiring stand-up comic, are neighbors who enjoy a cross-generational friendship. Nate, who shows no interest in girls, is coaxed by his classmate Darla, to go on a date with her friend James. They all attend a party at Nate's place.

Nate tells Margaret about his date, who in turn invites him to bring him for dinner. Once there, James spends his time during the meal texting, is dismissive of Margaret and of Nate's feelings for her, and then quickly decides to leave. They attempt to sneak out without first telling Margaret. Nate is then taken to a local nightclub, where he is uncomfortable, wants to leave, and becomes extremely upset once he realizes that he was taken there for selfish reasons by James, whose only interest was to remain there until he could be seen with Nate by an ex-boyfriend.

Nate returns home to find that his apartment had been burglarized. Margaret tells Nate she went in to return his keys and while there had decided to clean the place, but may have forgotten to lock the door on her way out. Nate, who lost all his possessions, is enraged and lashes out at Margaret. The two then go their separate ways. Nate moves away and Margaret goes on a road trip to perform her comedy act. With the passage of time, and feelings of longing and of sorrow, Nate and Margaret find each other again, apologize to one another, and resume their friendship.

== Cast ==
- Natalie West as Margaret
- Tyler Ross as Nate
- Conor McCahill as James
- Gaby Hoffmann as Darla
- Charles Solomon Jr. as Gregory Maddock
- Cliff Chamberlain as Jeffrey Tomlinson
- Danny Rhodes as Matthew
- Allison Latta as Rebecca
- Sadieh Rifai as Danielle
- Shawn Ryan as Joey
- John Ainsworth as Officer Martin
- Angela LaRocca as Mary

== Production ==
Nate & Margaret was filmed in Chicago, Illinois in the United States.

== Release ==
Nate & Margaret was released in the United States on June 12, 2012 by Breaking Glass Pictures to American audiences, first premiering in San Diego at the FilmOut Festival, then in Chicago, and New York City, and in 2013 to a German audience at the Queergestreift Filmfestival in Konstanz, Germany. It was later released on DVD, and on the streaming platforms Netflix, Amazon Prime, and Tubi.

== Reception ==
Nate & Margaret was generally well received. Roger Ebert, film critic at the Chicago Sun-Times writes, "This is a smart, observant movie about two very particular people, and its casting is pitch-perfect." Jeannette Catsoulis at The New York Times remarks that "this unusual little movie would like us to know just one thing: Passion is fine, but a pal is priceless." At Slant Magazine, Calum Marsh finds the film to be "endearing, hopeful, and quietly radical" and "a progressive comic drama made with real, palpable wit and heart."

On the review aggregator website Rotten Tomatoes, 80% of 10 critics' reviews are positive, with an average rating of 7/10. Metacritic, which uses a weighted average, assigned the film a score of 62 out of 100, based on 6 critics, indicating "generally favorable" reviews.
