= Rebecca Spence =

American actress

Rebecca Spence is an American actress from Chicago, Illinois. She is known for playing small roles in films like Public Enemies and Contagion and had lead roles in the 2010 science fiction film Earthling and the 2017 film Princess Cyd.

== Biography ==
Spence attended Hendrix College for her undergraduate degree and studied art at the Steppenwolf Theatre Company in Chicago.

== Filmography ==
Year	Title	Role	Notes
2006	The Break-Up	Jen	
2007	Grace Is Gone	Second Woman	
2009	Public Enemies	Doris Rogers	
2009	Lowering the Bar	Mrs. Greene	short film
2010	Taking Flight	Noah's Mom	short film
2010	Audrey the Trainwreck	Kate Meyers	
2010	Earthling	Judith	
2010	Matadors	Lauren	TV movie
2011	Contagion	Jon Neal's Wife	
2011	The Dilemma	Jackie	
2011	One Small Hitch	Carla Mahoney	
2011	Tiger Tail in Blue	Melody (the brunette)	
2013	Man of Steel	Young Mother	
2016	Fools	Fran	
2017	Princess Cyd	Miranda Ruth	
2018	Slice	Cheryl	
2018	World of Facts	Louise	
2018	Not Welcome	Claire	
2019	Saint Frances	Joan	
2021	Candyman	Finley Stephens	
2022	Rounding	Karen Adso	

== Television ==
Series	Role	Episode(s)
The Chicago Code	Mrs. Molaro	"St. Valentine's Day Massacre"
The Mob Doctor	Mary Moskal	"Change of Heart"
Boss	Tina	5 episodes
Crisis	"Janice Gibson"	4 episodes
Chicago Fire	Katherine Keating	"Madmen and Fools"
Detroit 1-8-7	Dierdre Spence	"Beaten/Cover Letter"
The Beast	Vanessa Shelby	"The Walk In"
Prison Break	Shauna Hudson	"The Old Head"
Easy	Cheryl	2 episodes
Utopia	Laura Christie	2 episodes
The Madison	Liliana Weeks	
