= A Marine Story =

2010 film by Ned Farr

- Official poster
- Directed by: Ned Farr
- Written by: Ned Farr
- Produced by: JD Disalvatore; Dreya Weber; Paris P. Pickard
- Starring: Dreya Weber; Paris P. Pickard; Christine Mourad; Anthony Michael Jones; Jason A. Williams
- Cinematography: Alexandre Naufel
- Music by: Craig Richey
- Production company: Red Road Studio
- Release date: June 19, 2010
- Running time: 98 minutes
- Country: United States
- Language: English

A Marine Story is a 2010 drama film written and directed by Ned Farr about the United States military's "Don't ask, don't tell" policy on gay, lesbian and bisexual people serving in the armed forces.

== Plot ==
Major Alexandra Everett, a decorated Marine officer (Dreya Weber) unexpectedly returns home from the Iraq War and is quickly recruited to help Saffron (Paris P. Pickard), a troubled teen, prepare for boot camp. However, when the true reasons for Alexandra's return become known, it threatens the future for both of them.

== Partial cast ==
- Dreya Weber as Alexandra Everett
- Paris P. Pickard as Saffron
- Christine Mourad as Holly
- Anthony Michael Jones as Leo
- Jason Williams as Turk
- Brad Light as Stenny
- Lisa Wolpe as Shelly
- Ned Mochel as Bill
- John Lee Ames as Dale
- Deacon Conroy as Burner
- Rob Beddall as Charlie (Meth Head)
- Gregg Daniel as Sheriff
- Alice Rievel as Nona
- Troy Rastash as Joe
- Jessica M. Bair as Lesbian Kissing on Dance Floor

== Production ==
A Marine Story was filmed in Los Angeles, beginning May 30, 2009. Ned Farr, and his real-life wife Dreya Weber, first developed the story as original programming for the here! network; however the budget was cancelled for economic reasons, and the two continued with the project independently. The film premiered at the Frameline Film Festival on June 19, 2010.

== Recognition ==
=== Critical response ===
Chuck Wilson and Ernest Hardy of LA Weekly praised the film, writing "[f]or their first film since winning the 2006 Outfest Audience Award for The Gymnast, writer-director Ned Farr and his wife, actress Dreya Weber, have made a huge artistic leap forward", and he admired "the fascinating, subtle beauty of Weber's portrayal of a woman who's been holding herself within for so long that she can barely breathe."

David Wiegand of San Francisco Chronicle wrote of the military policy of 'Don't ask, don't tell' being predominant at the Frameline festival in 2010, with "Marine Story being one of the winners, regardless of what happens with the official U.S. policy toward gays in the military." He shared that "[t]his film does not go where you might think it will go because it's so credibly written, acted and directed."

Dennis Harvey of Variety wrote "Despite the rather bleak setting and content, A Marine Story has tough-love humor and affection for its characters, who become very likable as things proceed. A violent blast of climactic meth-lab drama works well, as does a poignant, reserved coda. Through it all, Weber (the helmer's spouse and star of his prior feature, The Gymnast) is first-rate, and other cast members are assured; ditto the modest but expert assembly."

Gary M. Kramer of Philadelphia Gay News wrote "One surefire highlight at QFest this year is lesbian centerpiece selection A Marine Story, written and directed by Ned Farr and starring Dreya Weber. (The pair collaborated on The Gymnast a few years back.) This excellent character study has Alexandra (Weber) returning home after an honorable discharge from the Marines. Caught in the “Don’t Ask, Don’t Tell” crossfire, Alexandra is now re-evaluating her life. Her efforts, which include drinking too much and reflecting on her expulsion, also involve exploring a new relationship and training Saffron (Paris Pickard), a troubled girl, for the military. A Marine Story is consistently smart and engrossing, and Weber is again outstanding in the title role."

Sophia Hoffman of Velvet Park Media wrote "There have always been films about soldiers returning from war. Prodigal sons returning to their hometowns as patriotic heroes, usually with darkness inside them, scars from their time in combat lurking beneath the surface. It is rare to encounter a film about female soldier returning from war and rarer still that she is returning not only from Iraq but also from an on-going battle with an archaic and close-minded policy. A Marine’s Story highlights not only the difficulties of a female soldier returning from war but that of a gay soldier, who despite her commitment to and love for her country, is discharged from service because of her sexual orientation."

=== Awards and nominations ===
- 2010, Won "Audience Award for Outstanding Dramatic Feature, Outfest
- 2010, Won 'Grand Jury Award for Outstanding Dramatic Feature, Outfest
- 2010, Won 'Outstanding Actress in a Feature' for Dreya Weber, Outfest
- 2010, Won 'Grand Jury Prize, Colorado Film Festival
- 2010, Won 'Screenwriting award – Feature', Colorado Film Festival

== See also ==
- Cinema of the United States
