= Dreya Weber =

American actress

- Born: Midland, MI
- Occupations: Aerialist, Actress, Producer, Director
- Website: dreya-weber.com

Dreya Weber is an American actress, producer, director, and aerialist.

== Career ==
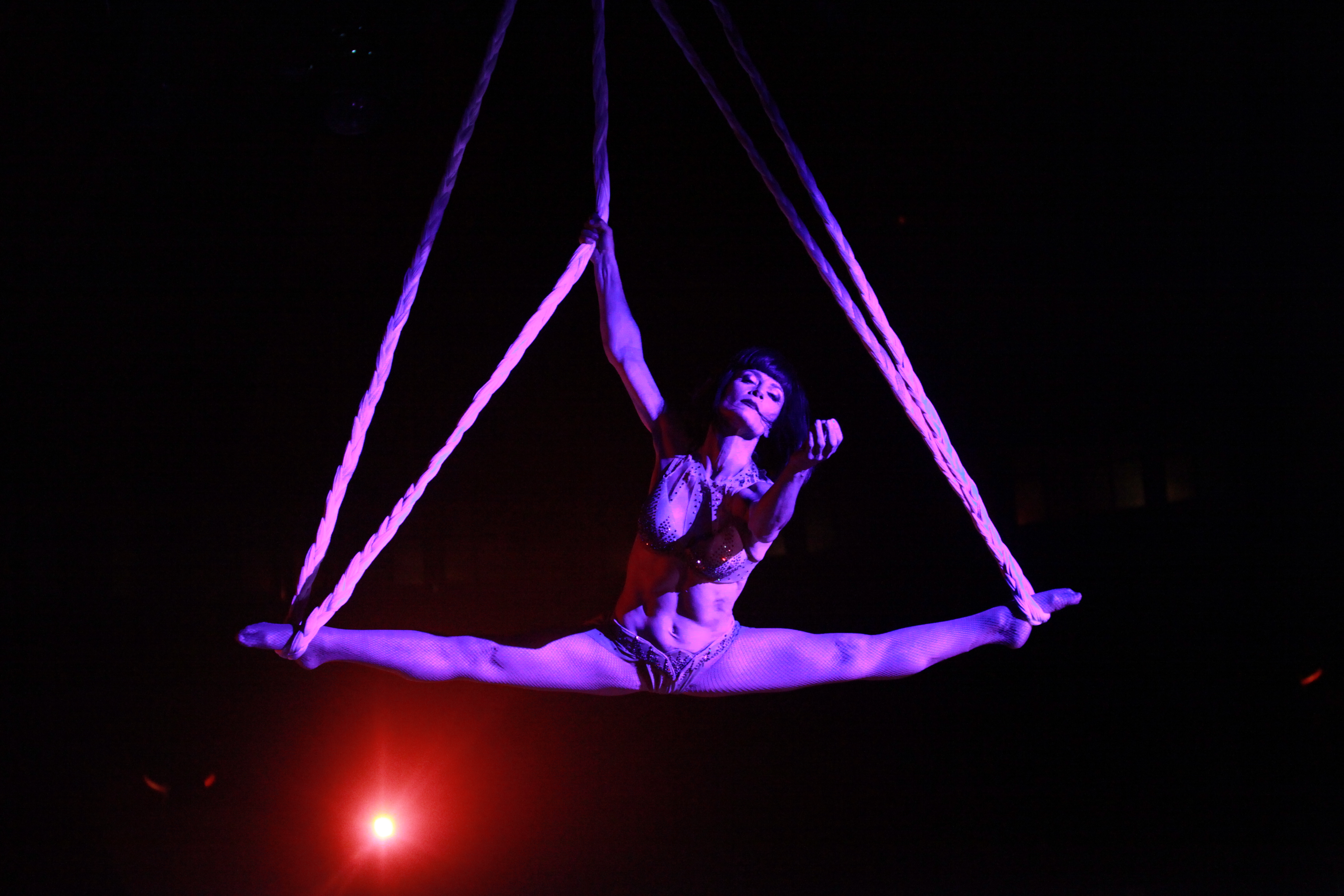
Dreya Weber as Cleopatra on aerial silks for Teatro ZinZanni in 2010

Weber toured with Cher during her Living Proof farewell tour and choreographed the performances by aerialists.

She produced and starred in The Gymnast (2006) which took home 28 festival awards, including Best Feature at Outfest, Newfest and Frameline, and demonstrated her aerial skills. She also produced and starred in A Marine Story about the US Military policy of Don't Ask, Don't Tell, and The Aerialist (2020), which is the sequel to The Gymnast.

She is the aerial choreographer for Magic Mike Live in Las Vegas, London, and on Broadway. Weber choreographed the opening aerial sequence for P!nk for the 2026 Tony Awards ceremony, in which P!nk made her entrance as Peter Pan.

Weber is developing a one-person show, "Hexen", at The Public Theater in New York City.

Weber is currently managed by Brooklyn Lavin Management.

== Personal life ==
During her teenage years, Weber competed with the Mexican National Hurdling Team, ranking within the top ten.

She performed aerial silk at the 2002 Winter Olympics in Salt Lake City. She is friends with Tony Horton and has featured in all three of his P90X home workout series.

In a 2006 AfterEllen interview, Weber described herself as omnisexual.

She is closely associated with the actor Frank Ferrante, alongside whom she has collaborated on several projects including Teatro ZinZanni and various productions relating to the Marx Brothers.

== Filmography ==
Film and television
Year	Title	Role	Notes
1986	Masterpiece	Pamela Mountbatten	"Lord Mountbatten - The Last Viceroy"
1996	Everything Relative	Luce	
1999	The Practice	Mrs. Henderson	"Infected"
2000	The Practice	Sister Janice Murray	"New Evidence", "Hammerhead Sharks"
2001	Lovely and Amazing	Donna	
2002	The Contractor	Claire Stevenson	Short film
2002	Dream a Little Dream for Me	Pearl	Short film
2005	The Catcher	The Flyer	Short film
2006	The Gymnast	Jane	
2006	Company Town	Jane Peroux	TV film
2009	The Neighborhood Ball: An Inauguration Celebration	Antigravity Performer	
2010	A Marine Story	Alexandra Everett	
2011	Water for Elephants	Circus Performer	
2015	Raven's Touch	Raven	Co-director (with Marina Rice Bader); screenwriter
2020	The Aerialist (film)	Jane Hawkins	

== Awards ==
- Outfest – Won, Dreya Weber – Outstanding Actress in a Feature, 2010.

== See also ==
- List of female film and television directors
- List of LGBT-related films directed by women
