= The Gymnast (2006 film) =

- Directed by: Ned Farr
- Written by: Michael Carp
- Produced by: Ned Farr
- Starring: Dreya Weber; Addie Yungmee; David De Simone
- Cinematography: Marco Fargnoli
- Edited by: Ned Farr
- Music by: Craig Richey
- Distributed by: Wolfe Releasing
- Release date: January 15, 2006
- Running time: 98 minutes
- Country: United States
- Language: English

The Gymnast is a 2006 film directed by Ned Farr and starring Dreya Weber, Addie Yungmee, and David De Simone. It received a sequel called The Aerialist released in 2020.

== Plot ==
Jane Hawkins (Dreya Weber) was once an Olympic gymnast whose career was ended by a devastating injury. Now in her 40s, she is in a loveless and childless marriage to her husband David (David de Simone) and works as a massage therapist, while still exercising religiously to keep herself in peak condition.

After a chance meeting with a former friend from the gymnastics world, Denise (Allison Mackie), Jane takes an interest in aerial dance and begins lessons with gymnastics trainer Nicole (Mam Smith). During her lessons, Jane meets Serena (Addie Yungmee), a Korean-American dancer who grew up in a Jewish adoptive family, and is a closeted (at least with respect to her parents) lesbian. Serena, Nicole and Jane begin to work together on a Cirque du Soleil style aerial act, which Nicole hopes to present in Las Vegas. However, Nicole is forced to drop out for family reasons. As Jane and Serena continue to work together on the act, they develop an increasingly romantic relationship. Jane finds herself torn between her growing love for Serena, and the potential for a rekindled relationship with her husband who now wants a child.

Jane's husband finds out about the attraction between the two women, and Jane packs her bags and leaves. The movie ends with Jane driving to Las Vegas, where Serena is.

== Cast ==
- Dreya Weber as Jane
- Addie Yungmee as Serena
- David De Simone as David
- Allison Mackie as Denise
- Mam Smith as Nicole
- Tony Horton as Chad

== Critical reception ==
The Gymnast won both the Grand Jury Award for 'Outstanding American Narrative Feature' and the Audience Award for 'Outstanding First Narrative Feature' at the 2006 Los Angeles Outfest film festival.

The Gymnast was positively reviewed. AfterEllen.com called it “a beautiful, understated film” that “stays true to itself and its characters.” Variety described it as “well acted, well performed” and “surprisingly engrossing despite treading familiar ‘Lifetime Movie’-type female empowerment territory.” In Out at the Movies, Steven Paul Davies said "The Gymnast has been simply one of the best, and most well-received, lesbian-interest movies of recent years." Conversely, in a scholarly analysis, academic Katharina Lindner noted the film's "clichéd story line" acted as "a reinforcement of rather problematic racial and sexual binaries."
