= Paul Marcarelli =

American actor (born 1970)

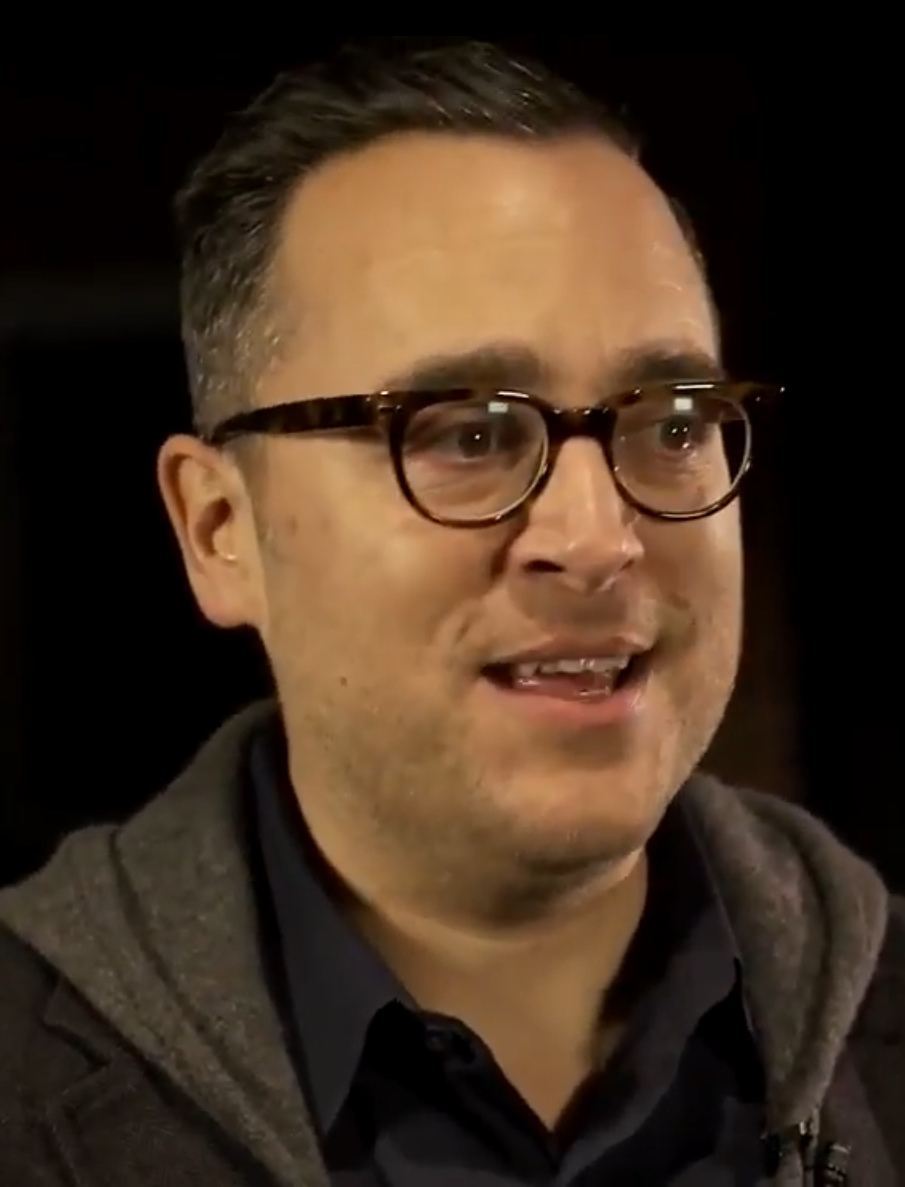
- Marcarelli in 2015
- Born: May 24, 1970 (age 56); North Haven, Connecticut, U.S.
- Education: Fairfield University, B.A.
- Occupations: Film, voice actor, screenwriter
- Height: 5 ft 9.5 in (1.77 m)

Paul Marcarelli (born May 24, 1970) is an American actor. He is best known for being the ubiquitous "Test Man" character in commercials ("Can you hear me now?") for Verizon Wireless from 2002 to 2011. He appeared in all of his Verizon commercials wearing a gray Verizon jacket and his own horn-rimmed glasses.

== Early life and education ==
Marcarelli is a native of North Haven, Connecticut, and graduated from North Haven High School. Marcarelli then received his bachelor's degree in English from Fairfield University in 1992, having been a member of Theatre Fairfield, the resident production company.

== Acting career ==
A founding member of New York's Mobius Group Productions in 1998, Marcarelli produced and performed in works by Eric Bogosian, Warren Leight, and Richard Nelson. Mobius's production of The Adding Machine, in which he played the lead role, garnered the award for excellence in overall production from the New York International Fringe Festival in 2001; and his 2005 production, Bridezilla Strikes Back! starring Cynthia Silver, which The New York Times called "irresistible", won the Fringe's overall excellence award for an outstanding solo show.

Marcarelli is also a founding member of the Table Ten Films production company. He co-wrote the storyline for the 2011 independent film The Green, for which he also wrote the screenplay.

Marcarelli wrote and produced the feature film Clutter, starring Carol Kane and Natasha Lyonne. The film won Best Film at the Harlem International Film Festival and was nominated for the New American Cinema Award in 2013.

== Advertising career ==
In 2002 Marcarelli started appearing as the "Test Man" character in Verizon Wireless commercials, for which Entertainment Weekly named him one of the most intriguing people of 2002.

In April 2011 Marcarelli was informed by email that Verizon was moving in a new direction with its advertising campaign. He remained under contract but would no longer play "Test Man". Marcarelli was glad that he was able to move on from it.

Prior to Verizon, Marcarelli had already appeared in numerous commercials for companies including Old Navy, Merrill Lynch, Dasani, T-Mobile, and Heineken. He also performed in industrial and promotional films, and as a voiceover artist for Comedy Central, United Airlines, and Aetna Insurance, among others.

Since 2016 Marcarelli has been working as a Sprint (later merged with T-Mobile) spokesman and often refers to his switch from Verizon to Sprint in the commercials in which he appears.

In 2025 Marcarelli returned as a Verizon spokesman in an advertisement that also featured astronaut Buzz Aldrin.

== Personal life ==
Paul is gay and is married to his husband Ryan Browneye who owns a catering business. They both reside in Litchfield, Connecticut where they own a farm and two pugs. They also appeared in a Sprint ad together.
