= Stephen Cone =

American filmmaker and actor

- Born: Louisville, Kentucky, U.S.
- Occupation(s): Actor, film director, editor, producer, writer
- Years active: 2005–present

Stephen Cone is an American filmmaker, best known for Henry Gamble's Birthday Party and Princess Cyd. He has received early career retrospectives on the Criterion Channel, Mubi, and at the Museum of the Moving Image, Berlin's Unknown Pleasures Festival and Manchester's Bigger Than Life.

== Early life ==
Cone was born in Louisville, Kentucky, and raised in South Carolina. He moved to Chicago in 2004 and, in his words, taught himself to make movies "by making movies."

== Career ==
In 2006, Cone wrote, produced and directed his first short film Church Story, starring Isabel Liss, Bill McGough and Arian Moayed. In 2007, Cone followed with the short film Young Wives. A medium-length film, a metaphysical drama called The Christians, was completed in 2008 and featured performances by J. Kingsford Goode, Bill McGough, Arian Moayed, Sadie Rogers, Laurel Schroeder, Krissy Shields and Robert Belushi, oldest son of actor Jim Belushi.

Cone's feature film In Memoriam, was released in 2011, and follows a group of college students reenacting the last hours of two dead peers who fell to their deaths attempting to make love. In Memoriam was praised by film critic Roger Ebert as "a touching film." Cone later reflected on the effect Ebert's review had, writing:

I had had almost zero success or exposure up to that point. In Memoriam was bombing with festival programmers. I, to this day, do not know why he reviewed that film, and I can't believe he actually liked it. (I'm too hard on that film, I think.) I'm not sure I would've kept going without a) those Ebert reviews, and b) programmer Kim Yutani programming The Wise Kids at Outfest.

Cone's third theatrical film, the coming-of-age drama The Wise Kids, also released in 2011, was a critical success. It also garnered praise from Ebert, Variety's Robert Koehler and Stephen Holden of The New York Times. The film was a Critics' Pick for The New York Times and won the Grand Jury Prizes for U.S. Feature and Best Screenplay at Outfest. It was subsequently released on cable/VOD and DVD by Wolfe Video.

In 2013, Cone released his fourth theatrical film Black Box. While not as widely seen as The Wise Kids, due to an initial lack of distribution, the film garnered praise from Newcity's Ray Pride and Michael Phillips of the Chicago Tribune, who gave the film 3½ out of 4 stars, and called it "a worthy follow-up to Cone's previous film." Black Box was later acquired by Devolver Digital Films for a late 2014 cable/VOD release.

Cone completed two unreleased experimental features in 2014, The Mystery of Life and This Afternoon, and in 2015 completed the coming-of-age drama Henry Gamble's Birthday Party. Henry Gamble was featured in The New York Times' "Anatomy of a Scene" series, screened within BAMcinemaFest and BFI Flare, and was the winner of the Silver Q Hugo Award at the 2015 Chicago International Film Festival. His next feature film, Princess Cyd, appeared on Vanity Fair's Ten Best Films of the 2010s after appearing on multiple Best of 2017 lists, including IndieWire, Vulture, Vanity Fair, Vox and NPR, and screening at dozens of festivals worldwide, including the BFI London Film Festival, BAMcinemaFest, Frameline and the Maryland Film Festival. It was acquired for distribution by Wolfe Releasing.

== Filmography ==
Year	Film	Credited Director	Credited Producer	Credited Writer	Credited Actor	Credited Role	Notes
2006	Church Story	Yes	Yes	Yes			Short film
2007	Young Wives	Yes	Yes	Yes			Short film
2008	The Christians	Yes	Yes	Yes			
2011	In Memoriam	Yes	Yes	Yes	Yes	Eric	
2011	The Wise Kids	Yes	Yes	Yes	Yes	Austin	
2013	Black Box	Yes	Yes	Yes			
2014	This Afternoon	Yes	Yes	Yes			
2014	The Mystery of Life	Yes	Yes	Yes			
2015	Henry Gamble's Birthday Party	Yes	Yes	Yes			
2016	Show Yourself				Yes	Daniel	
2017	Princess Cyd	Yes	Yes	Yes			
