= The Wise Kids =

- Directed by: Stephen Cone
- Written by: Stephen Cone
- Produced by: Stephen Cone; Laura Klein; Sue Redman
- Starring: Molly Kunz; Tyler Ross; Allison Torem
- Cinematography: Stephanie Dufford
- Edited by: Stephen Cone (uncredited)
- Music by: Mikhail Fiksel
- Distributed by: Wolfe Video
- Release date: July 9, 2011 (Los Angeles Outfest)
- Running time: 95 minutes
- Country: United States
- Language: English

The Wise Kids is a 2011 American drama film written and directed by Stephen Cone and starring Molly Kunz, Tyler Ross, Allison Torem, Matt DeCaro, Sadieh Rifai, and Stephen Cone. An ensemble, coming-of-age piece, the film follows a group of young members of a South Carolina Baptist church as they confront issues of homosexuality and a crisis of faith.

== Plot ==
Brea, Laura, and Tim are three high school seniors and close friends connected by their South Carolina Baptist church. As they prepare for life after graduation, Brea begins to have doubts about her beliefs, creating a rift between her and the devoutly religious Laura. Likewise, Tim begins to confront feelings of homosexuality, much to Laura's dismay. Brea's doubts about her faith continue to grow as she researches contradictions in the Bible. She befriends an outcast named Cheryl, the granddaughter of a longtime congregation member, Ms. Powell. Cheryl confesses to Brea that she is a nonbeliever, further prompting Brea's curiosity and disbelief.

Meanwhile, Elizabeth, a fellow congregation member, is suffering from a lack of sex with her husband Austin, the church's music director. Austin begins to confront his own feelings of homosexuality, even privately exchanging an awkward kiss with Tim during a house party. Elizabeth continues to struggle with her husband's lack of sex and embarrasses herself at a party after flirting with the church's married prospective youth director Dylan. Austin and Elizabeth later go out on their anniversary and get drunk. Afterward, despite his best effort, Austin is still unable to perform sexually for his wife.

Tim eventually comes out to his single father Jerry, who is accepting—if initially apprehensive—of his son's sexuality. Tim's younger brother Brad does not take the news as well, but Jerry advises Tim to give Brad some time to process it. Tim and Brea then take Cheryl out to a dance club, where Tim further explores his sexuality by passionately dancing with a stranger.

Laura starts feeling increasingly alienated from Tim and Brea, which is only further complicated when Tim and Brea are accepted into New York University. Feeling her once close relationship with Tim and Brea fading away, she tries to befriend April over a tense lunch date where she is introduced to Patrick, April's cousin. Laura, Brea, and Tim hang out for a final time before they head off to college. Laura then makes a final, impassioned plea for Brea to remain true to her faith.

The film then picks up after the three friends return home from their first semester at college. Laura is now dating Patrick while Tim and Brea are even closer than before. Jerry reaches out to Tim, asking him if he has met anyone at school. In turn, Tim suggests that his dad start looking for someone to date, too. Later that evening, Austin comes to Tim and confesses that he might be gay. Tim says that he is too and Austin cries on his shoulder.

The film concludes as the congregation members gather at the church's living nativity. Austin mouths the words "I love you" to Elizabeth and she mouths back "I love you, too."

== Cast ==
- Molly Kunz as Brea
- Tyler Ross as Tim
- Allison Torem as Laura
- Matt DeCaro as Jerry
- Sadieh Rifai as Elizabeth
- Stephen Cone as Austin
- Cliff Chamberlain as Dylan
- Sadie Rogers as Cheryl
- Ann Whitney as Ms. Powell
- Rodney Lee Rogers as Pastor Jim
- Lee Armstrong as Harry
- Laurel Schroeder as Erin
- Sharon Graci as Kathy
- Sullivan Hamilton as Haley
- Jonathan Jones as Josh
- Jacob Leinbach as Brad
- Tessa Nicole as Savannah
- Porter Spicer as Matthew
- Eric Hulsebos as Ryan
- Alyssa Puckett as April

== Production ==
To raise money for production, the film's writer and director Stephen Cone ran a Kickstarter campaign with a goal of $17,500. The campaign closed on July 18, 2010, having successfully raised $17,830. The film was shot on location in Cone's hometown of Charleston, South Carolina. Cone, the son of a Baptist minister, described elements of the film as semi-autobiographical, saying that he "experienced some of it, and some of it is speculation and curiosity, wondering about people [he] grew up with."

== Release ==
The Wise Kids was given its world premiere at the Outfest film festival in Los Angeles, California on July 9, 2011. It was later shown at the LGBT NewFest in New York, New York on July 23, 2011. The film also opened the 30th annual Reeling Gay and Lesbian Film Festival. It was premiered in Charleston on November 19, 2011.

=== Home media ===
The film was distributed by Wolfe Video who released the film on DVD January 8, 2013.

== Reception ==
=== Critical response ===
The Wise Kids received a very positive response from critics. The film holds a 100% positive "Fresh" rating on the review aggregator Rotten Tomatoes.

Roger Ebert of the Chicago Sun-Times gave the film 3 out of 4 stars and described its handling of the subject matter as "honest, observant, and subtle." Robert Koehler of Variety called the performers "a brilliant cast of young actors" and said of the film, "Most impressively, this is an ensemble piece in which no boogeymen are permitted, everyone is observed in shades of gray, and the easy out of making fun of true believers is simply not in the cards." Stephen Holden of The New York Times praised the film as "... a guileless exploration of the growing pains of sheltered innocents whose reticence and sincerity evoke 1950s small-town values" and added, "The performances all capture the perplexity of sexually repressed people who are trying to do the proper Christian thing while coping with unruly desires that they recognize as challenges to their way of life. In its unassuming way, this tiny, low-budget film is a universal reflection on issues of personal identity and choice for which there are no easy answers."

Melissa Anderson of The Village Voice was slightly more critical, commenting, "The Wise Kids suffers from a theater workshop-y tendency to rest too long on pauses and silences to convey dramatic heft. But the blunder is ultimately overshadowed by Cone's excellent young actors, particularly Torem, burrowing deeply into her character's zealotry and anguish about being left behind."

=== Accolades ===
The Wise Kids was selected as a Critics' Pick for The New York Times. The film won the Audience Award for Best Narrative Feature at NewFest and won the Jury Awards for Best Narrative Feature and Best Ensemble at the Out on Film film festival. It also won the Grand Jury awards for Outstanding U.S. Screenwriting and Outstanding U.S. Dramatic Feature at the Outfest film festival.
