= Jennifer Young =

American film producer and photographer (born 1969)

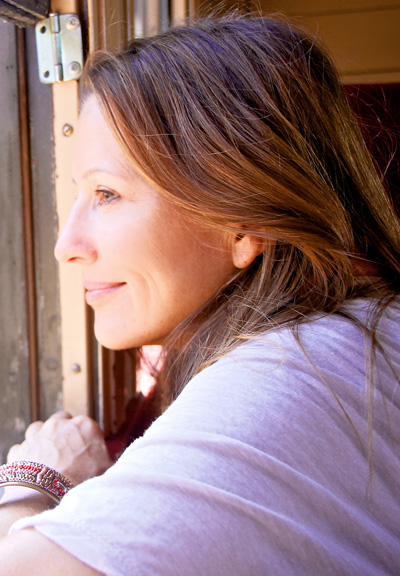
- Portrait of Young 2013
- Born: Jennifer Anne Young; August 21, 1969 (age 56); Cincinnati, Ohio, US
- Occupations: Producer, photographer
- Website: http://www.jenniyoung.me

Jennifer Young (born August 21, 1969) is an American film producer and photographer.

== Personal life ==
Young is an activist for equality. She lives in Los Angeles with her partner, Bryant McGill.

== Career ==
As a producer, Young's first feature film, Loving Annabelle, stars Erin Kelly, Diane Gaidry and Kevin McCarthy, debuted at the prestigious Cinequest Film Festival in 2006; the film won the Audience Award and Best Actress Award at Outfest. In addition, Loving Annabelle won Best Feature Film at Melbourne Film Festival (2006), Barcelona Film Festival (2006) and Atlanta Film Festival (2006), and the Jury Award at Paris Cinema Festival (2006); the film picked up six audience awards and four Jury Awards over the course of the six-month festival run.

=== Loving Annabelle ===
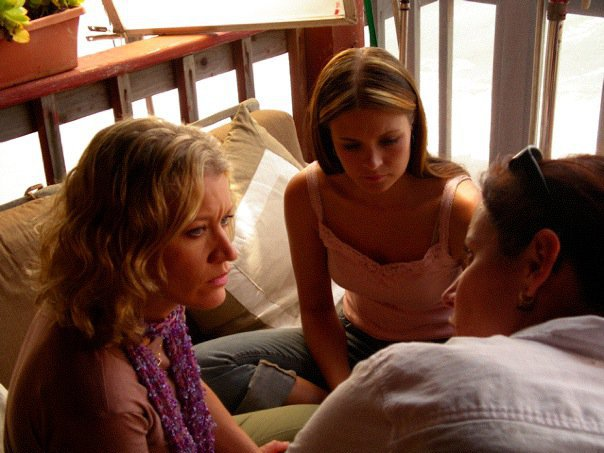
The stars and Director on the set of Loving Annabelle, 2006

Loving Annabelle is the controversial story of a Catholic boarding school teacher, Simone Bradley (Diane Gaidry), who has an affair with her female student, Annabelle (Erin Kelly). The film was summed up by Variety magazine as a "Guilty Pleasure", and has won numerous awards on the festival circuit, including the Outfest Award for Best Actress, and the Outfest Award for the Audience Choice. The film sat in the top five list of videos rented by lesbians according to Wolfe Video's web site (see www.wolfevideo.com). It is recommended by 100% of readers on scene-OUT.com, and is ranked on the bestseller's list in its category on Amazon.

=== Dear Emily ===
"Sara is going to visit her high school friend Emily. On her journey there, she recalls her last experience with her teenage crush, remembering a letter that she wrote Emily—a letter confessing her love for her. Following a painful flashback to Emily's mocking of Sara after she reads the note, and recalling the hurt that Emily had caused her, as Sara finally reaches her destination at the finale of this short film, she decides to keep on driving."

Produced by Jennifer Young, "Dear Emily" was funded by EVEO.com after Young and Katherine Brooks won a pitch contest for their feature film, Loving Annabelle. Despite being given only 6 weeks from conception to completion, and just $1,000 to make it, the film, to date, has made back over 500% of its profit.

== Filmography ==
=== Features ===
- Loving Annabelle, producer (2006)

=== Short films ===
- Dear Emily, producer (2001)
- The Complex, still photographer (2002)

=== Television ===
- Blonde Charity Mafia, Episode #1.1, talent producer (2009)
- Groomer Has It, First Things First, field producer (2008)
- R U the Girl, segment producer (2005)
- Who's Your Daddy?, segment producer (2005)
- Big!, associate producer (2004)
- The Simple Life (TV series) (2003)
- Switched Up!, segment producer (2003)
- One Bad Trip, segment producer (2003)
- The Bachelor (2002)
- Totally in Tune, still photographer (2002)
