= List of See Dad Run episodes =

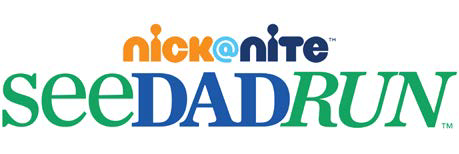

See Dad Run is an American sitcom television series that premiered on Nick at Nite on October 6, 2012, after a one-hour premiere of the iCarly episode, "iShock America" with 1.641 million viewers. The series is about actor who becomes a stay-at-home dad. He has to take care of his three kids, Emily (Ryan Newman), Joe (Jackson Brundage) and Janie (Bailey Michelle Brown) with the help of his best friends, Marcus (Mark Curry) and Kevin (Ramy Youssef). Baio also serves as an executive producer. Nickelodeon has ordered twenty episodes of the series. On December 19, 2012, Nick at Nite renewed the series for a second season, which premiered on June 2, 2013. On October 21, 2013, the series was renewed for a third season. Each episode title begins with the words "See Dad".

== Series overview ==
Season	Episodes	Originally released	
Season	Episodes	First released	Last released
1	20	October 6, 2012	May 12, 2013
2	15	June 2, 2013	January 19, 2014
3	13	February 9, 2014	December 4, 2014

== Episodes ==
=== Season 1 (2012–13) ===
No. overall	No. in season	Title	Directed by	Written by	Original release date	Prod. code	U.S. viewers (millions)
1	1	"See Dad Run Home"	Andrew D. Weyman	Tina Albanese & Patrick Labyorteaux	October 6, 2012	101	1.64
David Hobbs has spent the last decade playing a beloved father on one of TV's biggest sitcoms. When his series ends, he becomes a stay-at-home dad watching over his children, Emily, Janie, and Joe. Meanwhile, his wife, Amy, returns to her television career. Now, David must accustom to tending to his kids' every need. His children worry since he is never around, and barely knows anything about being a parent. David soon realizes how challenging it is to be an actual father. Note: This episode aired as a sneak peek after the 1 hour iCarly special "iShock America".
2	2	"See Dad Lose Janie"	Andrew D. Weyman	Tina Albanese & Patrick Labyorteaux	October 14, 2012	102	1.90
3	3	"See Dad Play Coach"	Andrew D. Weyman	Michael Feldman	October 21, 2012	103	1.52
David decides to coach Joe's baseball team, until his competitiveness overwhelms him. Emily tries to trick David and Amy by procrastinating on her psychology project.
4	4	"See Dad Rise from the Dead"	Victor Gonzalez	Paul Ciancarelli & David DiPietro	October 28, 2012	104	1.68
5	5	"See Dad Get Wah-Wah'd"	Jody Margolin Hahn	Perry Rein & Gigi McCreery	November 4, 2012	110	1.06
David and Marcus are producing a new TV show and try to get Ricky Adams (James Maslow), an actor who played David's son on his old TV show to star in it. However, Ricky's self-centered attitude annoys David. Amy is reluctant to get reading glasses.
6	6	"See Dad Meet Matthew Pearson"	Victor Gonzalez	Perry Rein & Gigi McCreery	November 11, 2012	105	1.16
Emily's latest crush Matthew Pearson (Luke Benward), is more interested in spending time with David than her.
7	7	"See Dad One Night Only"	Rich Correll	Matt Boren	November 18, 2012	106	1.64
8	8	"See Dad Catch a Rat"	Rich Correll	David DiPietro & Paul Ciancarelli	November 25, 2012	108	1.30
David tries to catch a rat loose in the house without the help of an exterminator. He also lies to Emily saying that he will catch it humanely since she is now a member of an animal rights group. Amy is not pleased with David having his reclining chair from his old TV show in the house, she then tries to get rid of it.
9	9	"See Dad Run Christmas Into the Ground"	Jonathan Judge	Tina Albanese & Patrick Labyorteaux	December 9, 2012	115	1.61
David, Marcus and the family spend all day in a warehouse club store to get a special dish for Christmas dinner. Amy must work on Christmas Eve dealing an unruly TV director. Kevin decorates the Hobbs' living room with Christmas decorations while they are away.
10	10	"See Dad Campaign"	Rich Correll	Matt Boren	February 17, 2013	117	1.46
Emily is running for class president against Xander (Jack Griffo), the son of David's old rival, Ted McGinley (Scott Baio's former Happy Days co-star), with David trying to find good ways to help her win. Meanwhile, Ricky Adams tries to apologize to David and Emily for his behavior but they won't forgive him. Emily gets worried about possibly losing the election and gets Ricky to help her sing the song "Stronger (What Doesn't Kill You)". She later ends up winning the election.
11	11	"See Dad Get Schooled"	Jonathan Judge	Perry Rein & Gigi McCreery	February 24, 2013	116	0.95
12	12	"See Dad Assist Kevin"	Jody Margolin Hahn	Earl Davis	March 3, 2013	112	1.23
13	13	"See Dad Run, But He Can't Hide"	Jody Margolin Hahn	Mitchel Katlin & Nat Bernstein	March 10, 2013	111	1.30
14	14	"See Dad Get Married and Married"	Rich Correll	Mitchel Katlin & Nat Bernstein	March 17, 2013	113	1.32
15	15	"See Dad as The Great and Powerful Hobbs"	Victor Gonzalez	Michael Feldman	March 31, 2013	109	1.24
16	16	"See Dad Play Hard to Get"	Madeline Cripe	Lisa Parsons	April 7, 2013	114	1.24
17	17	"See Dad Get Janie Into Kindergarten"	Jody Margolin Hahn	Michael Feldman	April 14, 2013	119	1.28
18	18	"See Dad Host a Playgroup"	Rich Correll	Lisa Parsons	April 21, 2013	107	1.48
19	19	"See Dad Get Attacked By Promzilla"	Anthony Rich	Paul Ciancarelli & David DiPietro	April 28, 2013	118	1.20
20	20	"See Dad See Through Grandma"	Jody Margolin Hahn	Tina Albanese & Patrick Labyorteaux	May 12, 2013	120	1.02

=== Season 2 (2013–14) ===
On December 19, 2012, See Dad Run was renewed for a second season. The season premiered on June 2, 2013. Raven-Symoné guest starred in the episode "See Dad Run a Fever", as Whitney Gibbons, a morning talk show host who wants David to appear on her show. The episode reunited Raven with Mark Curry, who previously worked together on the 1990s sitcom Hangin' with Mr. Cooper. Happy Days creator Garry Marshall reunited with Scott Baio in the episode "See Dad See Dad Run". Marshall played Bernie, David's TV father from his old sitcom. Marshall's son, Scott directed the episode.

No. overall	No. in season	Title	Directed by	Written by	Original release date	Prod. code	U.S. viewers (millions)
21	1	"See Dad Swoon"	Jody Margolin Hahn	Tina Albanese & Patrick Labyorteaux	June 2, 2013	202	1.11
22	2	"See Dad Get the Family to the Airport"	Jody Margolin Hahn	Michael Feldman	June 9, 2013	201	1.36
23	3	"See Dad Be Normal.ish"	Jonathan Judge	Matt Boren	June 16, 2013	205	1.27
Joe is declared a hero after saving someone's life in a shoe store. Emily tries to hide from David that her and Xander McGinley are dating.
24	4	"See Dad Throw a Birthday Party"	Jonathan Judge	Lisa Parsons	September 8, 2013	206	1.22
David agrees to throw a princess-themed birthday party for Janie. Kevin pretends to be Australian to date Chelsea (Gracie Dzienny), a pizza parlor employee.
25	5	"See Dad McLivin' with the McGinleys"	David DeLuise	David DiPietro & Paul Ciancarelli	September 15, 2013	204	1.01
Ted McGinley, his wife Gigi and their family pick the Hobbs family to take part their reality show McLivin' with the McGinleys, in which the Hobbs have to endure the McGinleys living in their house for three whole days. Meanwhile, Kevin and Marcus are accidentally locked in David's recording studio in the basement, where David recorded his old cheesy pop music.
26	6	"See Dad Prove He Has Chemistry"	Rich Correll	Earl Davis	September 29, 2013	207	1.06
27	7	"See Dad Run a Fever"	Victor Gonzalez	David L. Moses & Clay Lapari	October 6, 2013	209	1.15
28	8	"See Dad Send Emily Flowers"	Jody Margolin Hahn	Perry Rein & Gigi McCreery	October 13, 2013	216	1.08
29	9	"See Dad Run Halloween"	Jody Margolin Hahn	Earl Davis	October 20, 2013	214	1.41
30	10	"See Dad Dance Around the Truth"	Jody Margolin Hahn	Tina Albanese & Patrick Labyorteaux	November 3, 2013	218	1.40
31	11	"See Dad See Dad Run"	Scott Marshall	Mitchel Katlin & Nat Bernstein	November 10, 2013	213	1.16
32	12	"See Dad Have a Career"	Jody Margolin Hahn	Matt Boren	November 24, 2013	215	0.94
Joe films a documentary on David's life as a stay-at-home dad, but when David sees some of Joe's shot footage, he starts to realize how dull his life has become, compared to the parents of Joe's friends. Emily tries to convince her friend Bea to face her shyness and anchor the news for the school's television news program. Amy is excited about the new things her character will do on her soap opera.
33	13	"See Dad See Joe Sleepwalk"	Rich Correll	Scott Marshall & Garry Marshall	January 5, 2014	219	1.50
Joe's nervousness about kissing Amanda, causes him to sleepwalk. Marcus stays over the Hobbs' house, while his wife is away in Europe. Amy becomes anxious about the family's safety at home, particularly concerning David's attitude about the carbon monoxide detector.
34	14	"See Dad Run Until He Drops"	Jonathan Judge	David DiPietro & Paul Ciancarelli	January 12, 2014	220	1.20
Marcus' wife Alicia (Wendy Raquel Robinson), returns from her three-month stay in Europe in a completely slim figure. She then pushes her weight-loss regimine on Marcus, David and Amy, forcing David and Marcus to lie that they are working on a new sitcom to get out of exercising. Joe and his friends take part in a hip hop dance competition, but their lack of effort makes Joe join another competing group. Janie begins her imaginary friend phase, which makes Emily reminisce about her own phase.
35	15	"See Dad Roast the Toast"	Jonathan Judge	Nat Bernstein & Mitchel Katlin	January 19, 2014	217	1.22
David's freeloading cousin Fred (Paul Hipp) and his wife Mandy (Kelly Coffield Park), invites the Hobbs family to a hotel vacation, with David being the one to pay for all the expenses.

=== Season 3 (2014) ===
On October 21, 2013, See Dad Run was renewed for a third season. It was the final season of the series as announced on March 17, 2014. Initially ordered for thirteen episodes, the episode order was later increased, due to a number of unaired season two episodes, now airing as season three episodes, along with a one-hour series finale which was also ordered for the season. As of 2024, seven additional episodes were left unaired with "See Dad Get in the Ring" being last episode of the series to air to date in the U.S., these episodes have already aired internationally. ·

No. overall	No. in season	Title	Directed by	Written by	Original release date	Prod. code	U.S. viewers (millions)
36	1	"See Dad Nail Valentine's Day"	Jody Margolin Hahn	Earl Davis	February 9, 2014	301	0.91
Joe hears about a Valentine's Day curse on the Hobbs family men and fears that one will be put on him on his date with Amanda. Marcus entrusts David to watch over a necklace that he will give to Alicia for Valentine's Day, but when Amy sees the gift, she thinks it is hers, causing a predicament with David and Marcus. Emily helps Janie make Valentine's Day cards.
37	2	"See Dad Downsize"	Victor Gonzalez	David DiPietro & Paul Ciancarelli	April 3, 2014	210	1.24
Seeing the house cluttered with junk, David has the family have a garage sale. However, during the garage sale, David's memorabilia from his old sitcom is sold to an obsessed fan named Calvin Riggins (Daryl "Chill" Mitchell). Joe becomes frustrated when Amanda becomes instantly talented at all the hobbies that he is trying out for the first time.
38	3	"See Dad Run Joe Into Detention"	Jody Margolin Hahn	Michael Feldman	April 10, 2014	212	N/A
David makes Joe skip school, seeing that he has become very stressed to keep his perfect attendance record. But when they are caught in their lie about Joe missing school, they are forced to attend Saturday detention held by Principal Templeman (Tom Wilson). Amy becomes obsessed with finding out who has not been cleaning after their dog on the Hobbs front yard.
39	4	"See Dad Teach Emily to Drive"	Mitchel Katlin	Gigi McCreery & Perry Rein	April 17, 2014	208	N/A
David is reluctant to teach Emily how to drive. Janie and Kevin hide Janie's stuffed monkey, Dr. Monkey Chunks, so Joe can find it for a detective mystery game they are playing. Amy comes to the realization that she is a terrible driver.
40	5	"See Dad Run Into Marcus' Nephew"	Robbie Countryman	Mitchel Katlin & Nat Bernstein	April 24, 2014	304	1.16
Marcus' troublesome nephew Robbie (Doc Shaw) visits, but is heartbroken over recent breakup with his ex-girlfriend. David and Amy are against Emily driving at night to a house party. Joe wants to prove how responsible he is to David and Amy by babysitting Janie alone.
41	6	"See Dad Rough It"	Scott Marshall	Matt Boren	May 1, 2014	303	1.18
David agrees to be the parent chaperone at Joe's boy scout camping trip with their strict group leader Burwick (Christopher Gorham). However, Kevin tags along with David to make David's stay in the wilderness a lot more pleasurable, by bringing along David's trailer and the prop master from his old sitcom. Amy, Emily and Janie have the house all to themselves, while David and Joe are gone. Amy plans to have Janie's ears pierced by Kat (Vicki Lewis), a friend of hers who works the wardrobe on her soap opera, and is an ear piercing specialist. However, Janie already had them pierced by Emily right before Amy comes home to spend the day with them. So Amy tries to come up with another "first" she can do with Janie. Marcus has a hard time sleeping because of Alicia's new loud parrot.
42	7	"See Dad Ruin Joe's Teacher"	Jody Margolin Hahn	Gigi McCreery & Perry Rein	October 2, 2014	203	0.80
David has a hard time telling Joe's teacher Mr. Maury Mumbrue (Jonathan Slavin), an aspiring screenwriter that his script is terrible, all while Joe is worried about doing a good job with his poetry slam. Janie hides Emily's cell phone so she can spend time with her.
43	8	"See Dad Lose the Forest for the Tree House"	Rich Correll	Tina Albanese & Patrick Labyorteaux	October 9, 2014	211	0.84
David tries to convince Joe that he can build a tree house, just so he can show up his handy neighbor Bob (Valente Rodriguez). Amy gets Emily a job as the wardrobe assistant on her soap opera, everything goes well until Emily and Bea ruins the dress that Amy is supposed to wear in an upcoming episode.
44	9	"See Dad Become Room Mom"	Jody Margolin Hahn	Michael Feldman	October 16, 2014	302	0.98
David has a hard time leaving Janie at school and becomes room mom. When he realizes how much work it is, he causes mayhem to get out of it. Meanwhile, Joe runs away from a scary older student on his first day of 7th grade.
45	10	"See Dad Live at Five"	Rich Correll	Tina Albanese & Patrick Labyorteaux	November 6, 2014	305	N/A
46	11	"See Dad Watch Janie Run Away"	Rich Correll	Jay Kogen	November 13, 2014	306	N/A
47	12	"See Dad Fire Original Katie Again"	Jody Margolin Hahn	Gigi McCreery & Perry Rein	November 20, 2014	307	N/A
48	13	"See Dad Get in the Ring"	Scott Marshall	Paul Ciancarelli & David DiPietro	December 4, 2014	308	N/A
While visiting Bulk (Quinton "Rampage" Jackson), a professional wrestler who trained him in an old wrestling movie, David is challenged by Dr. Mayhem (Mark "Bully Ray" LoMonaco) to fight in a match. David thinks the challenge is all in fun, until he realizes at the wrestling press conference that Mayhem is not joking. David is also forced to fight to impress Joe, who in turn also wants to impress a cool kid from his school. Meanwhile, Amy is called to Janie's school to find out that she has been disruptive in class. Amy later finds out that Janie has been imitating bad behavior from Emily and her friends, whom in turn got the behavior from a viral video.
49	14	"See Dad Rest His Case"	Unknown	Unknown	May 2, 2024 (TeenNick Europe)	309	N/A
50	15	"See Dad Runner Up"	Unknown	Unknown	May 3, 2024 (TeenNick Europe)	310	N/A
Still trying to avoid her boss, Amy is forced to deal with him directly when Emily competes in a beauty pageant against his daughter. Joe is forced to enlist Kevin and Marcus as video game teammates leading to some interesting gardening.
51	16	"See Dad Jump"	Jody Margolin Hahn	Unknown	May 6, 2024 (TeenNick Europe)	311	N/A
52	17	"See Dad's Mom with Mom's Dad"	Unknown	Unknown	May 7, 2024 (TeenNick Europe)	312	N/A
53	18	"See Dad Overreact"	Unknown	Unknown	May 8, 2024 (TeenNick Europe)	313	N/A
54	19	"See Dad Find His Way Home (Parts 1 & 2)"	Jody Margolin Hahn	Unknown	May 9, 2024 (Pt.1); May 26, 2024 (Pt.2) (TeenNick Europe)	314	N/A
55	20	"See Dad Find His Way Home (Parts 1 & 2)"	Jody Margolin Hahn	Unknown	May 9, 2024 (Pt.1); May 26, 2024 (Pt.2) (TeenNick Europe)	315	N/A
Part 1: After rushing makes David run over Joe's science project and Emily's foot, he fears becoming a home dad just made life worse for his family. David's guardian angel character drags him into an alternate reality where he remained a TV star, while his family's lives took a turn for the worse. Part 2: David accepts a role in a cop detective action movie, so the whole family follows him to New York. When they accidentally ruin an expensive stunt scene, Amy takes the kids home, but they're taken hostage at a bank. David and his insecure co-star Nick rush to the rescue, discovering the captors are fans of David's shows.
