= Alfredo Flores =

American music video director

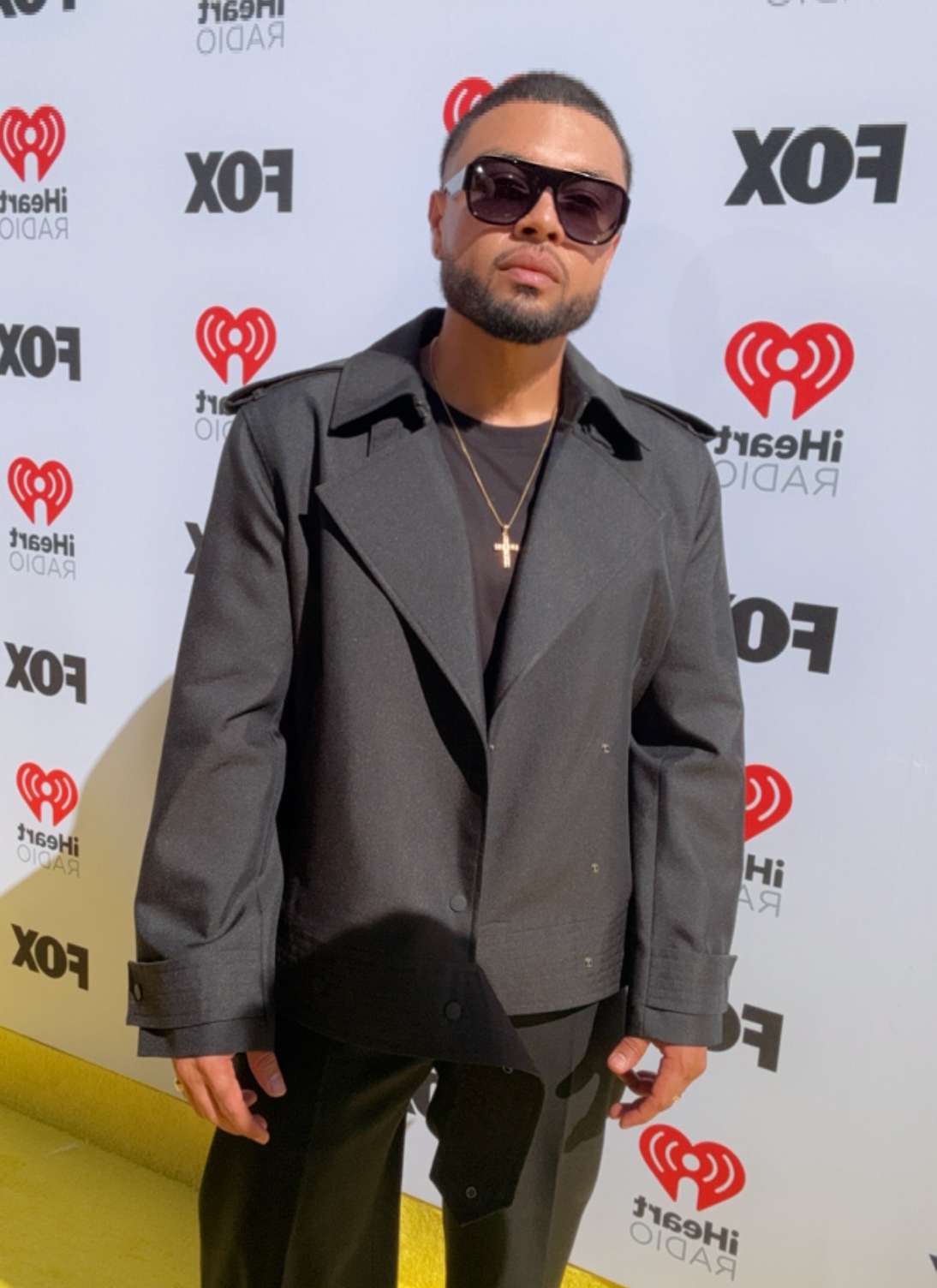
- Born: Alfredo Flores; June 16, 1989 (age 36); Belleville, New Jersey, U.S.
- Occupations: Cinematographer; Director; Photographer
- Years active: 2007–present
- Notable work: Ariana Grande: Dangerous Woman Diaries

Alfredo Flores (born June 16, 1989) is an American director, documentarian and photographer known for directing music videos and documentaries. He frequently collaborates with artists such as Justin Bieber, Ariana Grande, Karol G, Sabrina Carpenter, JoJo, Rihanna and Selena Gomez.

Flores made his documentary debut filming the 2011 concert film Justin Bieber: Never Say Never. He subsequently worked on Never Say Never's 2013 sequel Justin Bieber's Believe. Flores created the 2018 docuseries Ariana Grande: Dangerous Woman Diaries.

His notable photography work includes the album cover for Ariana Grande's Thank U, Next as well as her single artworks for "Bang Bang", "Bed", "Dance to This" and "7 Rings". He photographed the cover for JoJo's album Trying Not to Think About It as well as Justin Bieber's single "Anyone".

His most notable music videos include "Pray" and "Love Me" (Justin Bieber), "Santa Tell Me" (Ariana Grande), "Monopoly" (Ariana Grande & Victoria Monét), "Stuck with U" (Justin Bieber & Ariana Grande), Jordin Sparks "Call my Name" Jacob Latimore's "Selfish" and "Games" (Cassie Steele).

== Early life ==
Alfredo Flores grew up in Belleville, New Jersey. His mother came from San Sebastián, Puerto Rico. He attended New York Film School in 2007 before attending Santa Monica Film School. While in school, he interned with music video director Eric White. He subsequently worked as a production assistant on the music video for Chris Brown's "With You". He also filmed behind-the-scenes footage of the production of Mariah Carey's "Memoirs of an Imperfect Angel".

== Career ==
After moving from New York to Santa Monica, Flores began an internship at Geffen Records. He met Justin Bieber on the set of School Gyrls (2009) while shooting behind-the-scenes for director Nick Cannon, and agreed to shoot a behind-the-scenes video for Bieber. Flores subsequently collaborated with Bieber on various projects and later joined Bieber as tour videographer on his 2010 My World Tour. He directed the music videos for Bieber's 2010 singles "Love Me" and "Pray".

In 2011, Flores was tour photographer on Selena Gomez's We Own the Night Tour, and created a documentary series of the same name about the tour. He directed the music videos for the singles "Natural" and "All These Boys" by Jasmine V. In the same year, Flores was a videographer on Rihanna's Loud Tour.

In 2012, he joined Bieber's Believe Tour, and filmed the concert documentary Justin Bieber's Believe. Later that year, Flores and Katherine Brooks shared the award for "Best Director" at the 4th Shorty Awards. He was nominated again for "Best Director" at the 6th Shorty Awards in 2014, and won at the 7th Shorty Awards in 2015.

Flores photographed the cover art for Ariana Grande's 2015 single "Focus" while on her Honeymoon Tour as photographer and videographer. During these time he also developed the web series “Honeymoon Tour Diaries”.

In 2017, Flores was Ariana Grande's tour photographer on the Dangerous Woman Tour. In an interview with Refinery29, he discussed the events of the Manchester Arena bombing and Grande's decision to return for the One Love Manchester concert. He directed a four-part docuseries titled Ariana Grande: Dangerous Woman Diaries, which was released on November 28, 2018.

In 2018, he photographed the cover art for Troye Sivan's single "Dance to This", Nicki Minaj's "Bed", and Ariana Grande's "The Light Is Coming". The following year he photographed the cover art for Ariana Grande's 2019 album Thank U, Next.

Flores shot and directed Ariana Grande's rendition of "I Won't Say (I'm in Love)" as part of The Disney Family Singalong, which aired April 16, 2020. He also directed the music video for Stuck with U, a charity single by Bieber and Grande. The video won "Best Music Video From Home" at the 2020 MTV Video Music Awards. He was nominated for "Favorite Tour Photographer" in the 2020 iHeartRadio Music Awards for his work on the Sweetener Tour.

In 2021, he photographed Ariana Grande for her official The Voice portrait. He photographed the cover art singles for Bichota, Mamiii, Location and Sejodioto for Karol G as well as her promo images for her Bichota Tour. He photographed the album cover for JoJo (singer) 2021 EP Trying Not to Think About It. He directed the music video for Inaya's Fallen and the music video for the first single About You from R&B newcomer Blxst debut project.

In 2022, he was nominated and won the Shorty Awards for "Best Live Streaming" for his Direction in the livestream telecast Pride Eve, hosted by Raven-Symoné and was the photographer for the 2022 Casa de Spotify pop up at the Latin Grammys

In 2023, he embarked on tour with Sabrina Carpenter for her Emails I Can't Send Tour as well as her opening slot of Taylor Swift's The Eras Tour which garnered him a nomination at the 2024 iHeartRadio Music Awards for favorite tour photographer. A nomination he received again and won the following year at the 2025 iHeartRadio Music Awards for his work on her Short n' Sweet Tour

== Personal life ==
In August 2022, Flores publicly came out as gay on Instagram.

== Awards ==
Awards and nominations
Year	Award	Association	Result
2025	Favorite Tour Photographer	iHeartRadio Music Awards	Won
2024	Favorite Tour Photographer	iHeartRadio Music Awards	Nominated
2022	Best Live Streaming	Shorty Awards	Won
2020	Best Music Video from Home	MTV Video Music Awards	Won
2019	Best Tour Photographer	iHeartRadio Music Awards	Nominated
2015	Best Director	Shorty Awards	Won
2014	Best Director	Shorty Awards	Nominated
2012	Best Director	Shorty Awards	Won

== Videography ==
Year	Title	Artist(s)	Director	Notes
2024	samsung Y2K	Sabrina Carpenter	Yes	
2023	sorry	Jacob Latimore	Yes	
2023	call my name	Jordin Sparks	Yes	
2023	hottie with a body	Kat DeLuna	Yes	
2023	Demon	Dante Bowe	Yes	
2022	KFC	Jack Harlow	Yes	
2022	Selfish	Jacob Latimore	Yes	
2022	Pride Eve	Inviz	Yes	Hosted by Raven-Symoné
2021	About You	blxst	Yes	
2021	Fallen'	Inaya	Yes	
2020	Wishlist	JoJo, PJ Morton	Yes	
2020	December Baby	JoJo	Yes	
2020	Stuck with U	Ariana Grande, Justin Bieber	Yes	Co-directed with Scooter Braun and Rory Kramer
2019	Monopoly	Ariana Grande, Victoria Monét	Yes	Co-directed with Ricky Alvarez
2017	Wiser	Madilyn Bailey	Yes	
2017	Hollywood	Sophia Grace	Yes	
2016	Voices	Lilly Singh	Yes	
2015	Dreamsicle	Dumblonde	Yes	Co-directed with Aubrey O'Day
2015	I Bet (acoustic)	Ciara	No	Edited
2014	Santa Tell Me	Ariana Grande	Yes	Co-directed with Jones Crow
2014	Games	Cassie Steele	Yes	
2014	Darling	MAX	Yes	
2011	Natural	Jasmine V	Yes	
2011	Middle of Nowhere	Selena Gomez & the Scene	Yes	
2010	Love Me	Justin Bieber	Yes	
2010	Pray	Justin Bieber	Yes	Co-directed with Scooter Braun
2007	With You	Chris Brown	No	

== Filmography ==
Year	Film	Credited as					Role	Notes
Year	Film	Director	Cinematographer	Producer	Editor	Actor	Role	Notes
2024	A Nonsense Christmas with Sabrina Carpenter	No	Yes	No	No	No	photographer	
2022	Sabrina Carpenter Nonsense Live	Yes	Yes	Yes	Yes	No		LA Wiltern Theater
2020	The Disney Family Singalong	No	No	No	Yes	No	—N/a	TV special
2020	&Music	No	Yes	No	No	No	—N/a	
2020	Justin Bieber: Seasons	No	Yes	No	No	No	—N/a	"The Finale"
2018	Droppin' Cash: Los Angeles	No	No	No	No	No	Self	Season 2: Episode 13
2018	Ariana Grande: Dangerous Woman Diaries	Yes	Yes	Yes	Yes	No	—N/a	
2016	"Aisle Intervention"	Yes	No	No	No	No	—N/a	Ad for Lawry's Seasoned Salt
2013	Justin Bieber's Believe	No	Yes	No	No	No	—N/a	
2012	"Girlfriend"	Yes	No	No	No	No	—N/a	Fragrance ad based on Justin Bieber's "Boyfriend"
2012	Justin Bieber: All Around the World	No	No	No	No	Yes	—N/a	
2011	Justin Bieber: Never Say Never	No	Yes	No	No	No	—N/a	
2009	Pacquiao vs. Hatton: The Battle of East and West	No	No	No	No	Yes	Self	TV special
2009	Party Monsters Cabo	No	No	No	No	Yes	Self	"Nick Cannon"
2009	Boo!	No	No	No	Yes	No	—N/a	Short film
2009	Stringing in the Streets	No	No	No	No	Yes	Emcee	Short film
2009	Nickelodeon Kids' Choice Awards 2009	No	No	No	No	Yes	Self	
2009	School Gyrls	No	No	No	Yes	No	—N/a	
2008	Jonas Brothers: Living the Dream	No	No	No	No	Yes	Self	"Hello Hollywood"
2008	Making the Band	No	No	No	No	Yes	Self	"Episode 2.4"
