= See Dad Run =

American television sitcom (2012–2014)

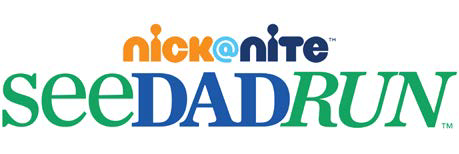
- Genre: Sitcom
- Created by: Tina Albanese; Patrick Labyorteaux
- Starring: Scott Baio; Alanna Ubach; Ryan Newman; Jackson Brundage; Bailey Michelle Brown; Ramy Youssef; Mark Curry
- Theme music composer: Dan Petty
- Composers: Rick Marotta; Brent Boyett
- Country of origin: United States
- Original language: English
- No. of seasons: 3
- No. of episodes: 48 (7 unaired) (list of episodes)

Production
- Executive producers: Scott Baio; Mitchel Katlin; Nat Bernstein; Eric Bischoff; Jason Hervey; Tina Albanese; Patrick Labyorteaux
- Producer: Scott Baio
- Cinematography: Patti Lee; Antar Abderrahman Jr.
- Camera setup: Multi-camera
- Running time: 22 minutes
- Production companies: Katlin/Bernstein Productions; Bischoff Hervey Entertainment; Nickelodeon Productions

Original release
- Network: Nick at Nite
- Release: October 6, 2012 – December 4, 2014

See Dad Run is an American television sitcom that premiered on Nick at Nite on October 6, 2012. It stars Scott Baio, who also serves as an executive producer.

The show is about an actor named David Hobbs (Scott Baio) who becomes a stay-at-home dad. He has to take care of his three kids, Emily (Ryan Newman), Joe (Jackson Brundage) and Janie (Bailey Michelle Brown), with the help of his best friends, Marcus (Mark Curry) and Kevin (Ramy Youssef).

In June 2014, Nickelodeon released See Dad Run: The Complete First Season as a manufacture on demand (MOD) release through Amazon.com in region 1.

== Cast ==
=== Main cast ===
- Scott Baio as David Hobbs
- Alanna Ubach as Amy Hobbs, David's wife
- Ryan Newman as Emily Hobbs, David and Amy's oldest daughter
- Jackson Brundage as Joe Hobbs, David and Amy's son
- Bailey Michelle Brown as Janie Hobbs, David and Amy's youngest daughter
- Ramy Youssef as Kevin, the young production assistant of David's old sitcom, who helps David around the house
- Mark Curry as Marcus Barnes, the head writer of David's old sitcom who also lives across the street from him

=== Recurring cast ===
- Jaylen Barron as Mary Barnes, Emily's best friend and Marcus' daughter
- Alyvia Alyn Lind as Charlotte, Janie's best friend
- Bebe Wood as Amanda, Joe's girlfriend
- Bridget Shergalis as Bea, Emily's friend
- Brianne Tju as Taylor, Emily's friend
- Danika Yarosh as Olivia, Emily's friend
- Luke Benward as Matthew Pearson, Emily's ex-boyfriend
- James Maslow as Ricky Adams, an actor who played David's son in his old sitcom
- Michele Lee as Maggie, Dave's mother
- Ted McGinley as a fictionalized version of himself
- Jack Griffo as Xander McGinley, Ted McGinley's son and Emily's ex-boyfriend

== Episodes ==
Season	Episodes	Originally released	
Season	Episodes	First released	Last released
1	20	October 6, 2012	May 12, 2013
2	15	June 2, 2013	January 19, 2014
3	13	February 9, 2014	December 4, 2014

== Reception ==
See Dad Run has been met with mixed reviews from critics. On the review aggregator, Metacritic, the first season holds a score of 50 out of 100. David Hinckley from The New York Daily News gave the show 2 out of 5 stars. Emily Ashby of Common Sense Media gave it 4 out of 5 stars. Brian Lowry of Variety says "Baio doesn't do much to elevate the limp material, but he doesn't sink it either."

== Production ==
On October 24, 2011, Nickelodeon greenlit a pilot of the series, then known under its working title Daddy's Home, making it the first original comedy on Nick at Nite. On March 27, 2012, 11 episodes were ordered.

On December 19, 2012, Nick at Nite renewed the series for a second season.

On October 21, 2013, the series was renewed for a third season.

On March 17, 2014, See Dad Run was canceled with production of the third season ending in May.

== Syndication ==
See Dad Run aired on NickMom from January 1, 2013 to September 27, 2015, and aired on TeenNick for a short time from 2012 to 2013.
