= Melancholy Baby =

- Directed by: Sean Hood
- Written by: Sean Hood
- Produced by: Amanda Sweikow; Cain DeVore
- Starring: Patrick Labyorteaux; Linda Tomassone
- Cinematography: Fortunato Procopio
- Edited by: Michael Cioni
- Release date: May 4, 2009 (Garden State Film Festival)
- Running time: 14 minutes
- Country: United States
- Language: English
- Budget: 5,000

Melancholy Baby is a drama/thriller short film, written and directed by Sean Hood, and starring Patrick Labyorteaux, who plays a man suffering from both agoraphobia and obsessive–compulsive disorder. The film is notable for its creative use of sound design.

Although its official premiere was at the Garden State Film Festival in 2009, the film screened at the Directors Guild of America as part of a gala fund raiser for Filmmakers Alliance.

== Plot ==
Zachariah Block is a shut-in who spends much of his day compulsively sorting and re-sorting ordinary objects into jars. His routine changes when a woman moves into the apartment next door. By listening to her movements through the walls and watching her through a vent, he becomes drawn into her life. When he senses that she is in danger, he overcomes his debilitating fears, summons up a small act of genuine courage, and saves his neighbor's life.

== Production ==
The screenplay for Melancholy Baby was developed in a workshop sponsored by Filmmakers Alliance. The script went on to win The Los Angeles Short Filmmaking Grant. Using a crew made up primarily of Filmmakers Alliance members, the film was shot over the course of a single weekend. It was shot on the Red One, a camera made by the Red Digital Cinema Camera Company.

== Awards ==
- Los Angeles Short Filmmaking Grant 2007
- Accolade Competition
  - Award of Excellence, Short Film 2009
- USA Film Festival/Short Film & Video Competition
  - Finalist

== See also ==
- List of American films of 2009
