= Wendy Liebman =

American stand-up comedian (born 1961)

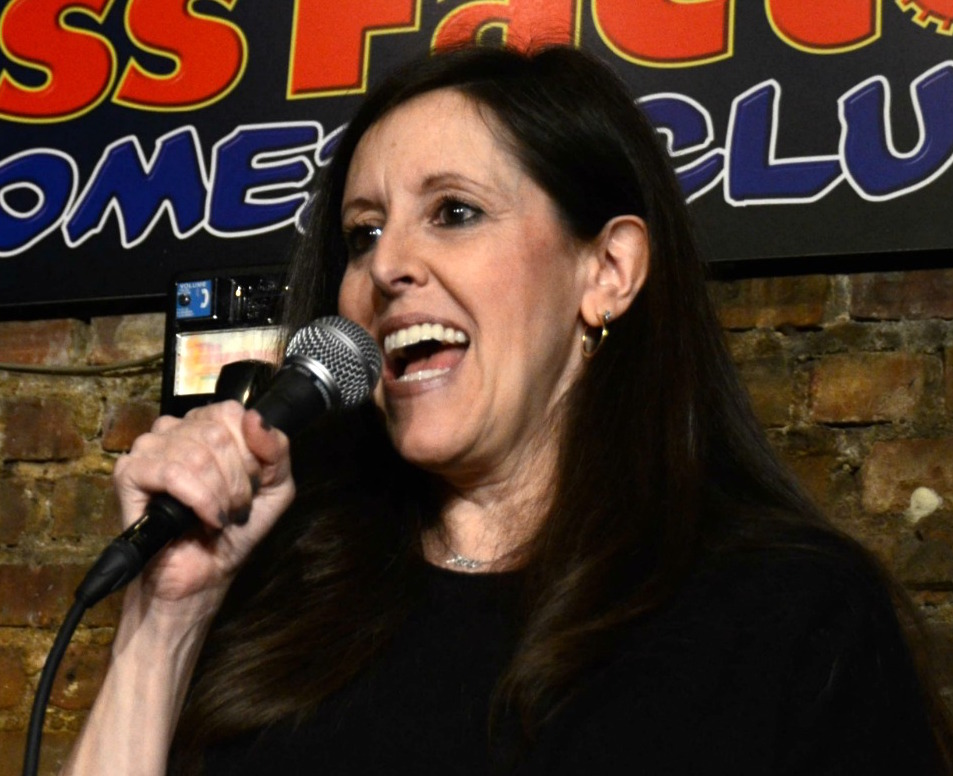
- Wendy Liebman performing at the Stress Factory in New Brunswick, 2012
- Born: February 27, 1961 (age 65); Manhasset, New York, United States
- Education: Wellesley College
- Spouse: Jeffrey Sherman (2003-present)

Comedy career
- Medium: Stand-up comedy, television
- Genre: Observational comedy
- Subjects: American culture, everyday life
- Website: wendyliebman.com

Wendy Liebman (born February 27, 1961) is an American stand-up comedian. Her standup style involves the use of gently paced, subtle wordplay.

== Early life ==
Liebman was born in Manhasset, New York and grew up in Roslyn, New York. Her earliest performances involved her, her sister, and a neighborhood friend performing the play Rumpelstilskin in their basement.

In 1983, Liebman graduated from Wellesley College with a bachelor's degree in psychology. After graduating from college, Liebman did a stint as a psychology researcher at Harvard Medical School Massachusetts Mental Health Center.

== Career ==
In 1984, after taking a class at the Cambridge Center for Adult Education, Liebman began performing stand-up comedy in the Boston area.

In 1996, Liebman won the American Comedy Award for Female Stand-up Comedian of the Year.

Liebman has appeared on The Tonight Show with Johnny Carson, The Larry Sanders Show on HBO, Dr. Katz – Professional Therapist, Jimmy Kimmel Live!, Late Show with David Letterman, Late Night with Jimmy Fallon and The Late Late Show with Craig Ferguson.

In November 2011, her Showtime special, Wendy Liebman: Taller On TV debuted. In May 2012, it was posted on her website as a $5 DRM-free download, then in 2014 it was released as an audio download.

Liebman is the daughter-in-law of the late Robert B. Sherman.

In 2014, Liebman and her husband were driving when they were struck by a drunk driver. The accident resulted in damage to seven cars and one fatality. The incident affected Liebman's standup career, and so the following year, to "get back out there in a big way" Liebman decided to be a contestant on season nine of America's Got Talent. On August 13, 2014, she was eliminated in the quarter-finals, but on August 15, 2014, judge Howard Stern picked Liebman as his wild card for the season, bringing her to the semi-finals. She was eliminated once more on the September 3 episode.

== Personal life ==
Liebman is Jewish. Although she did not grow up with a strong Jewish identity, she developed a greater connection to her Judaism after reading The Complete Idiot's Guide to Jewish History and Culture.

On April 12, 2003, Liebman married TV producer and writer Jeffrey Sherman, whose father and uncle (the Sherman Brothers) wrote film music for Walt Disney in the 1960s. Sherman has two sons from a previous marriage.

== Discography ==
=== Album ===
- Taller on TV (2014) (Image Entertainment)

== Filmography ==
=== Shorts ===
- The Remote (2000) directed by Frank Chindamo
- 50 Greatest (2011) (spoof of VH1 countdown shows)

=== Stand-up specials ===
- Girls' Night Out (1994)
- Women of the Night IV (1995)
- Comic Relief VII (1995)
- HBO Comedy Half-Hour (1996)
- Stand-Up Spotlight (2002)
- Green Collar Comedy Show (2010)
- Wendy Liebman: Taller on TV (2011); also director
