= Sean Hood =

American screenwriter (born 1966)

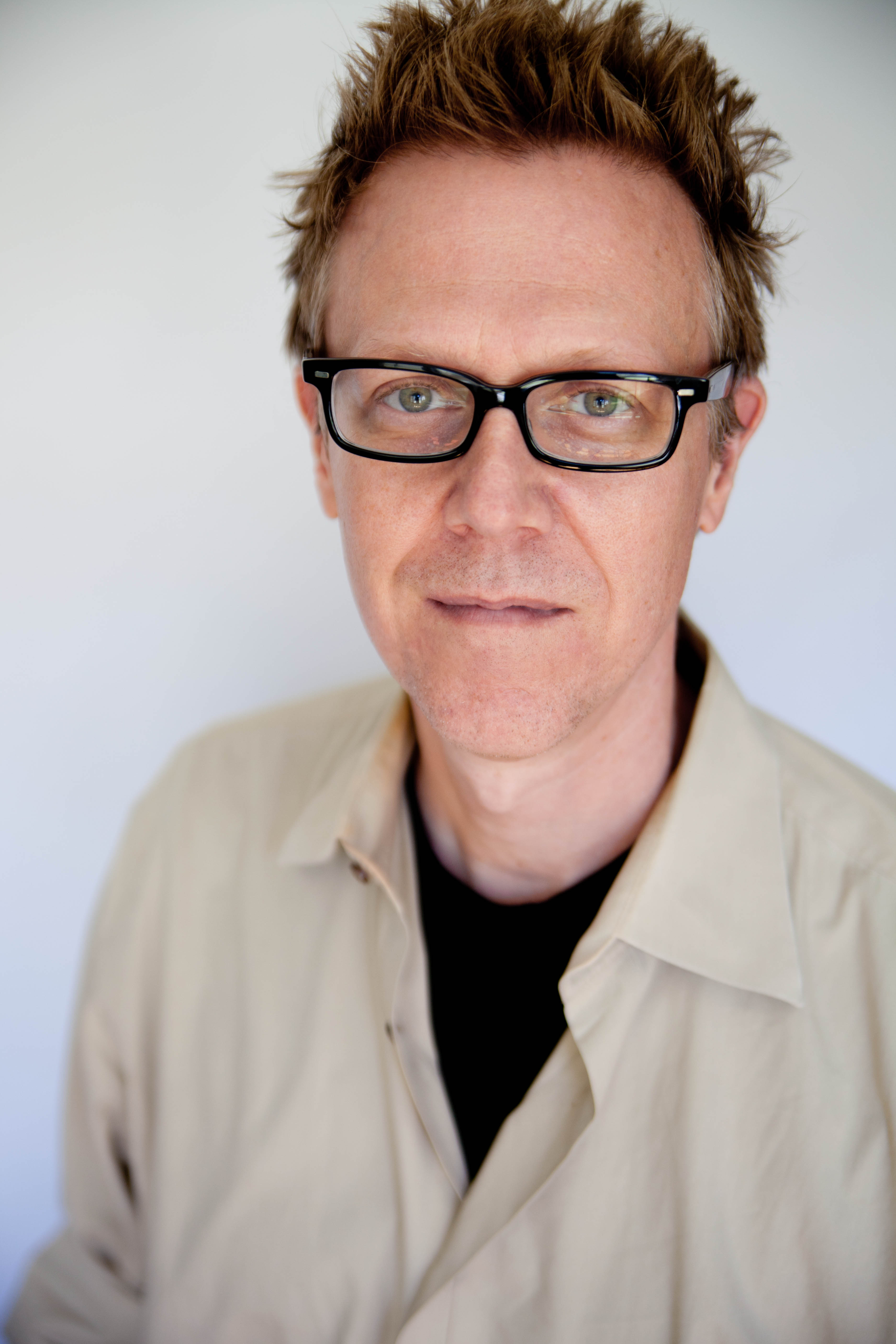
- Born: August 13, 1966 (age 59); Milwaukee, Wisconsin, United States
- Occupation: Screenwriter
- Spouse: Micki Stern

Sean Hood (born August 13, 1966) is an American screenwriter and film director.

== Early life ==
Hood graduated from Brown University, with a double major in pure mathematics and studio art, and then spent several years working in Hollywood as a set dresser, prop assistant and art director working with filmmakers as diverse as James Cameron, David Fincher and David Lynch. He continued his studies at the USC School of Cinematic Arts, graduating in 1997 with an MFA in production. His student short film, "The Shy and the Naked" won a grant from the Sloan Foundation for the positive portrayal of science.

== Career ==
=== Screenwriting ===
Hood sold his first spec screenplay to MTV Films in 2000, and went on to sign a deal with Dimension Films, which included rewrites on Halloween: Resurrection and Cursed. He went on to work on Conan the Barbarian for producer Avi Lerner, and Hercules: The Legend Begins. Most recently, he penned a screenplay adaptation of the novel Rolling in The Deep, which will be produced by J. Todd Harris and directed by Mary Lambert (director). In 2011, Hood was hired to write the script for the fifth Rambo film, titled Rambo: Last Stand, however, Hood's script was put on hold in early 2012. In 2014, Hood's Rambo: Last Stand script was abandoned in favor of a new script by Sylvester Stallone.

=== Television ===
He wrote the episode Echoes for the NBC horror anthology series Fear Itself. Similarly, he contributed to the Showtime horror anthology series Masters of Horror by penning the episode Sick Girl.

Hood also worked on Sick for The CW. and The Dorm for MTV. In 2022, he adapted Warren Ellis' comic FreakAngels into an animated series for Crunchyroll.

=== Directing ===
He was one of the founding members of Filmmakers Alliance and often collaborates creatively with FA's president, Jacques Thelemaque. His most recent short film is Melancholy Baby.

=== Blogging ===
Hood wrote the screenwriting blog Genre Hacks from 2008 until 2017.

=== Teaching at USC ===
He is currently an adjunct professor at the USC School of Cinematic Arts. He teaches the courses "Writing the Feature Script", "Advanced Motion Picture Script Analysis", and "Creating The Short Film."

== Credits ==
=== Film ===
Year	Film	Credit	Notes
1998	The Shy and the Naked	Writer	Short film, also director
1999	The Darklings	Writer	TV film, co–wrote with Brendan Hood
2002	Halloween: Resurrection	Screenplay by	Co–wrote with Larry Brand
2002	Cube 2: Hypercube	Story by/Screenplay by	Co–wrote with Ernie Barbarash & Lauren McLaughlin
2003	Alone	Writer	Video short, also director
2005	The Crow: Wicked Prayer	Screenplay by	Co–wrote with Lance Mungia & Jeff Most
2008	Melancholy Baby	Writer	Short film, also director
2008	Midnight Movie	Story by	
2011	Conan the Barbarian	Written by	Co–wrote with Thomas Dean Donnelly and Joshua Oppenheimer
2014	The Legend of Hercules	Written by	Co–wrote with Daniel Giat
2014	The Dorm	Writer	TV film

=== Television ===
Year	Series	Credit	Notes
2006	Masters of Horror	Writer	1 episode
2008	Fear Itself	Writer	1 episode
2022	FreakAngels	Writer	8 episodes
