= I'll Always Come Find You =

- Standard cover. Deluxe cover shows Blxst standing beside the same car

Studio album by Blxst
- Released: July 19, 2024
- Length: 56:31
- Labels: Red Bull; Evgle
- Producers: Blxst; Aksel Arvid; Alan Rodrigo; Ashton Sellars; Ben10k; Berg; Bizness Boi; Blake Straus; Burnley; Cardiak; CD.mp3; Cheese; Cole YoursTruly; Cubeatz; Dahi; DDot Omen; Deats; Derelle Rideout; Dirty Dave; Dylan Graham; Fabio Aguilarr; Frano; Grandmaster Vic; Gyft; Halfway; Hoops; Jae5; Jakik; Jay Millian; J. Pilot; Kareem Yafi; Kay; Keanu Beats; Lido; Mathaius Young; Matt Bernard; Mulherin; Nico Baran; P2J; Patron; Sounwave; Spanker; Tom Levesque; Tommy Parker; T.Y. Jake; V-Lex; WU10; Zach Ezzy

Blxst chronology
Sixtape 3 (2023)	I'll Always Come Find You (2024)	Unreleased (2025)

Singles from I'll Always Come Find You
- 1. "Risk Taker" Released: May 22, 2024; 2. "Dance with the Devil" Released: June 28, 2024

Professional ratings
Review scores
Source	Rating
Clash	8/10

I'll Always Come Find You is the debut studio album by the American rapper and singer Blxst, released on July 19, 2024, by Red Bull Records and Evgle LLC. The album features guest appearances from 2 Chainz, Amanda Reifer, Anderson .Paak, Becky G, Fatman Scoop, Feid, Joony, Joyce Wrice, Kamasi Washington, Offset, and Ty Dolla Sign; its deluxe edition adds collaborations with Bino Rideaux, K Camp, and Dej Loaf. Production on the album was handled by a variety of producers, including Cardiak, Cheese, Cubeatz, DJ Dahi, P2J, and Sounwave, who also serves as its executive producer. I'll Always Come Find You follows Blxst's Sixtape 3 (2023) EP and is intended to complete a narrative from his previous solo projects, No Love Lost (2020) and Before You Go (2022).

In promotion of the album, Blxst has released the singles "Risk Taker" and "Dance with the Devil", as well as embarking on the I'll Always Come Find You Tour, which started on October 1, 2024, at the House of Blues in Houston, Texas, and concluded on December 5, 2024, at The Republik in Honolulu, Hawaii.

== Singles ==
The album's lead single, "Risk Taker" with Offset was released on May 22, 2024. The album's second and final single, "Dance with the Devil" with Anderson .Paak was released on June 28, 2024, alongside the album's official announcement.

== Track listing ==
Disc 1
No.	Title	Writer(s)	Producer(s)	Length
1.	"Paper Route" (with 2 Chainz)	Matthew Burdette; Tauheed Epps; Jason Goldberg; Kevin Gomringer; Tim Gomringer; Blake Straus; Caleb Shannon	Cheese; Cubeatz; Straus; Kay	3:11
2.	"'Evgle & Son'"	Burdette; Mark Spears; LaRoyce Hawkins; Lekan Akinsoji; City James	Blxst; Sounwave; Grandmaster Vic^{[c]}; Matt Bernard^{[c]}; Noah Ehler^{[c]}	1:22
3.	"Long Way" (with Amanda Reifer)	Burdette; Amanda Reifer; Spears; Frano Huett; Benjamin Wilson; Jordan Lusitini; Dacoury Natche; David Marcus	Sounwave; Frano; Ben10k; Burnley; Dahi; Dirty Dave	2:54
4.	"Want You to Know"	Burdette; Marcus; Bailey Goldberg; Emmanuel Asante; Roy Spears; Christian Taylor; Marshall Mulherin; Parker Mulherin; Zach Ezickson	Berg; DDot Omen; Gyft; Mathaius Young; Mulherin; Zach Ezzy	2:49
5.	"Selfish Ways"	Burdette; Spears; Wilson; Dylan Graham; Stephane Antoine	Sounwave; Ben10k; Dylan Graham; Patron; Bernard^{[c]}	3:47

Disc 2
No.	Title	Writer(s)	Producer(s)	Length
1.	"Too Many Friday Nights" (with Fatman Scoop)	Burdette; Isaac Freeman III; Henri Velasco; Nija Charles	Hoops	2:54
2.	"Reason"	Burdette; Richard Isong; Ashton Sellars; Straus; Jake Hogan; Michael Orabiyi	P2J; Sellars; Straus; T.Y. Jake	2:59
3.	"Risk Taker" (with Offset)	Burdette; Kiari Cephus; Wilson; Marcus; James Fauntleroy	Ben10k; Dirty Dave	3:43
4.	"Private Show"	Burdette; Marcus; Immanuel McMillian; Aidan Crotinger; Jake Wogan; Calvin Dickinson	Dirty Dave; Jay Millian; Halfway; Jakik; CD.mp3	2:58
5.	"How Many"	Burdette	Blxst	2:16

Disc 3
No.	Title	Writer(s)	Producer(s)	Length
1.	"Bad Idea"	Burdette; Spears; Keanu Torres; Fabio Aguilar; Brittany Hazzard	Sounwave; Keanu Beats; Aguilar; Grandmaster Vic^{[c]}; Bernard^{[c]}; Ehler^{[c]}	2:06
2.	"Thousand Hours" (with Joony)	Burdette; Jonathan Negero; Marcus; Straus; Alan Corleto; Alejandro Miranda; Karim Yafi	Dirty Dave; Straus; Alan Rodrigo; V-Lex; Yafi	2:32
3.	"Dance with the Devil" (with Anderson .Paak)	Burdette; Brandon Anderson; Wilson; Aksel Hauge; Peder Losnegård; Tom Levesque	Ben10k; Aksel Arvid; Lido; Levesque	3:31
4.	"I Had To"	Burdette; Wilson; Straus; Andre Robertson; Derelle Rideout; Victor Ekpo	Blxst; Ben10k; Straus; Bizness Boi; Rideout; Grandmaster Vic	2:23
5.	"Rewind" (with Feid and Becky G)	Burdette; Salomón Hoyos; Rebbeca Gomez; Wilson; Marcus; Antoine; Nicolas Baran; Akil King; Sara Schell	Ben10k; Dirty Dave; Patron; Nico Baran; Carlos A. Molina^{[v]}	2:42

Disc 4
No.	Title	Writer(s)	Producer(s)	Length
1.	"Better Off Friends" (with Joyce Wrice)	Burdette; Tevin Plaate; Dani Kaag	Spanker	2:49
2.	"Always Something"	Burdette; Isong; Straus; Dominik Patrzek; Orabiyi	P2J; Straus; Deats	2:44
3.	"I Need Your Love" (with Ty Dolla Sign)	Burdette; Tyrone Griffin, Jr.; Spears; Wilson; Straus; Jorge Pilot; Thomas Lumpkins; Charles	Sounwave; Ben10k; Straus; J. Pilot; Tommy Parker; Bernard^{[c]}	3:09
4.	"To the Moon"	Burdette; Straus; Carl McCormick; Kelvin Wooten; Maranda Thomas; Samuel Jean	Straus; Cardiak; Wu10	2:44
5.	"Ten Summers or Better" (with Kamasi Washington)	Burdette; Kamasi Washington; Marcus; Ekpo; McMillian; Jonathan Awote-Mensah	Dirty Dave; Grandmaster Vic; Jay Millian; Jae5; Cole YoursTruly	2:58
Total length:				56:31

Disc 5 – deluxe edition
No.	Title	Writer(s)	Producer(s)	Length
1.	"Not in the Mood"	Burdette; Corleto	Alan Rodrigo	2:15
2.	"Only Us" (with Bino Rideaux)	Burdette; Brandon Rainey; Christopher Wilson; Dejuan Walker; Frank Nitty; Jared Grace; Kameron Cole	Hollywood Cole; Tharealcstylez; Tharealjfkbeatz	2:29
3.	"Said and Done"	Burdette; Braxton Cook; Jonah Christian; Elijah Fox	Blxst; Cook; Christian; Fox	2:33
4.	"Make Room" (with K Camp and Dej Loaf)	Burdette; Kristopher Campbell; Deja Trimble; Alex Moss-Bolanos; Lumpkins	Blxst; Alex Oso; Tommy Parker	2:47
5.	"At Least You Know"	Burdette; Fox; Marcus; Jack Siegel	Blxst; Dirty Dave; Fox; Jack Siegz	3:27
Total length:				60:10

=== Notes ===
- ^{^[c]} signifies a co-producer

== Personnel ==
Vocals

- Blxst – lead vocals (all tracks), spoken word as "Birdie" ("To the Moon")
- 2 Chainz – lead vocals ("Paper Route")
- LaRoyce Hawkins – spoken word ("'Evgle & Son'")
- Tru Xo – spoken word ("'Evgle & Son'")
- E-40 – spoken word ("Long Way", "Always Something")
- Abigal Achiri – spoken word ("Selfish Ways")
- Christina Carbajal – spoken word ("Selfish Ways")
- Kiara Sheé – spoken word ("Selfish Ways")
- Fatman Scoop – lead vocals ("Too Many Friday Nights")
- Nija Charles – background vocals ("Too Many Friday Nights")
- Offset – lead vocals ("Risk Taker")
- James Fauntleroy – background vocals ("Risk Taker")
- Rose Gold – background vocals ("Reason", "Private Show", "Dance with the Devil", "I Need Your Love")
- Joyce Wrice – background vocals ("Private Show")
- Raleigh Seldon – background vocals ("Private Show")
- Charles "CB" Burks III – spoken word ("Bad Idea")
- City James – spoken word ("Bad Idea")
- Jayson "Jay Macc" Taylor – spoken word ("Bad Idea")
- Joony – lead vocals ("Thousand Hours")
- Molly Arizona – background vocals ("Thousand Hours")
- Anderson .Paak – lead vocals ("Dance with the Devil")
- Genia Simone – background vocals ("Dance with the Devil")
- Breanne Laguana – spoken word ("Better Off Friends")
- Jay 305 – spoken word ("Better Off Friends")
- Scribz Riley – background vocals ("Always Something")
- Ty Dolla Sign – lead vocals ("I Need Your Love")
- Karri – background vocals ("I Need Your Love")
- Maranda Thomas – background vocals ("To the Moon")
- Snoop Dogg – spoken word ("To the Moon")

Technical

- Chris Athens – mastering
- Lance Powell – mixing (all except "Paper Route"), engineering
- Dylan Waterhouse – mixing ("Paper Route")
- James Musshorn – engineering
- Chris Ulrich – engineering (all except "Rewind")
- Blxst – engineering ("Want You to Know", "Reason", "How Many", "I Had To", "Rewind", "To the Moon"), vocal engineering for Offset ("Risk Taker")
- Finis "Ky" White – vocal mixing for 2 Chainz ("Paper Route")
- Jason "Cheese" Goldberg – vocal engineering for Blxst ("Paper Route")
- Nolan Presley – vocal engineering for 2 Chainz ("Paper Route")
- JRich Ent. – vocal engineering for Offset ("Risk Taker")
- Jhair "Jha" Lazo – vocal engineering for Anderson .Paak ("Dance with the Devil")
- Carlos A. Molina – vocal engineering for Becky G ("Rewind")
- Tony Austin – orchestra engineering ("Ten Summers or Better")
- Jeremy "Jboi" Jung – sound designer ("'Evgle & Son'", "Selfish Ways", "Bad Idea")
- Noah Rodriguez – engineering assistance
