= Ariana Grande: Dangerous Woman Diaries =

Documentary series

- Genre: Documentary
- Developed by: Alfredo Flores
- Starring: Ariana Grande; Scott Nicholson; Brian Nicholson; Pharrell Williams; Lady Cultura; Alfredo Flores; Joan Grande; Nonna Grande; Scooter Braun; Frankie Grande
- Country of origin: United States
- Original language: English
- No. of seasons: 1
- No. of episodes: 4

Production
- Executive producer: Alfredo Flores
- Producers: Alfredo Flores; Ariana Grande
- Production locations: New York City, Los Angeles, Manchester, Miami, Hong Kong
- Cinematography: Alfredo Flores
- Editors: Alfredo Flores; Ariana Grande
- Running time: 27–37 minutes
- Production companies: Good Story Entertainment; Federal Films; PolyGram Entertainment

Original release
- Network: YouTube Premium
- Release: November 29, 2018

Ariana Grande: Dangerous Woman Diaries is an American documentary streaming television series, created by Alfredo Flores, that premiered on November 29, 2018, on YouTube Premium. The series documents American singer Ariana Grande, her backup tour dancers, management team, album producers, friends and family as they embark on her 2017 Dangerous Woman Tour.

On February 16, 2019, Grande announced on her Twitter that Sweetener Diaries, a follow-up to this series, will be in production throughout the course of her Sweetener World Tour, before being remade as the concert film Excuse Me, I Love You scheduled to be released in 2020.

== Premise ==
Ariana Grande: Dangerous Woman Diaries follows singer Ariana Grande during her Dangerous Woman Tour in 2017 and features "the making of Grande's last album, Sweetener, concert performances, never-before-seen highlights from the Dangerous Woman Tour and moments from her One Love Manchester tribute concert." The series also features Grande's reflections on the events of the bombing at her concert at Manchester Arena that occurred during her tour.

== Production ==
On July 23, 2018, Ariana Grande announced via her official Twitter account that a documentary series following her 2017 Dangerous Woman Tour was set to be released. Vanity Fair's Josh Duboff commented that "the quality is pretty lo-fi—most of the footage has the feel of a friend holding a camera or phone up in Grande’s face, or following her as she moves about a studio or set." The documentary was not initially intended to be created until after the tour ended, so the performances shown in the series were all recorded on different dates throughout the tour.

On November 28, 2018, it was announced that the series had been titled Ariana Grande: Dangerous Woman Diaries and consisted of four episodes directed by Alfredo Flores and produced by YouTube Premium. The series was released to YouTube Premium subscribers via Grande's official YouTube channel on November 29, 2018 with each episode of the series made available for free on Thursdays through December 20, 2018.

== Episodes ==
No.	Title	Directed by	Original release date
1	"The Light Is Coming"	Alfredo Flores	November 29, 2018
2	"Here's the Gag"	Alfredo Flores	November 29, 2018
3	"Grateful"	Alfredo Flores	November 29, 2018
4	"One Love"	Alfredo Flores	November 29, 2018

== Reception ==
In a positive review, Decider's Kayla Cobb praised the series and recommended that audiences "Stream it for sure. Ariana Grande is an increasingly fascinating celebrity with a touching relationship with her fans. She's one of the good things out there, and we all need to celebrate our pop queen more."

In a more mixed critique, Common Sense Media's Melissa Camacho awarded the series three out of five stars criticized the series saying, "If you’re not an Ariana Grande fan, you won't find much here beyond a lot of self-promotion. But chances are that tween and younger teen fans will find a lot of fun here."
