= Before You Go (mixtape) =

Mixtape by Blxst
- Released: April 22, 2022
- Genres: Hip hop; R&B
- Length: 32:24
- Labels: Evgle; Red Bull
- Producers: Blxst; Ashton Sellars; Blake Straus; D.Woo; the Eastie Boyz; Grandmaster Vic; Jahaan Sweet; J-Mo; Jenk; J-Pilot; Los Hendrix; Mike & Keys; Oh Gosh Leotus; Rogét Chahayed; Sevn Thomas; Tharealcstylez; Tharealjfkbeatz; Tim Suby

Blxst chronology
Just for Clarity (2021)	Before You Go (2022)	Just for Clarity 2 (2023)

Singles from Before You Go
- 1. "About You" Released: December 3, 2021; 2. "Sometimes" Released: March 3, 2022; 3. "Every Good Girl" Released: April 22, 2022; 4. "Never Was Wrong" Released: May 12, 2022

Before You Go is the first (Note: second if counting No Love Lost (2020)) mixtape by the American rapper and singer Blxst. It was released on April 22, 2022 via Evgle and Red Bull. The mixtape debuted at number 90 on the US Billboard 200. It features collaborations with Arin Ray, Grandmaster Vic, Rick Ross, and Zacari. Production was handled by a variety of record producers, including Mike & Keys, Sevn Thomas, Tharealcstylez, Tharealjfkbeatz, and Blxst himself, among others.

== Background ==
In an interview with Billboard, Blxst explained the meaning of the mixtape saying "Before You Go is basically a note to self, speaking on the transition I feel like I'm facing as an artist, as an executive. Mainly just leaving some things behind from my past, or taking some things with me."

== Singles and promotion ==
On December 3, 2021, Blxst released the first single of the mixtape titled "About You", with the music video being released on January 26, 2022, directed by Alfredo Flores. The second single was released on March 3 titled "Sometimes" featuring Zacari. On April 22, he released the music video for "Every Good Girl". On May 12, the music video for "Never Was Wrong" was released.

== Critical reception ==
Professional ratings
Review scores
Source	Rating
AllMusic	4/5 stars

Before You Go received positive reviews upon release. Revolt said "Unfortunately, some R&B artists are hit the worst when it comes to a sophomore slump, yet Blxst has managed to completely avoid that and continue building on his sound. For some, Before You Go can feel like a 13-track, 32-minute extension of his 2020 debut, No Love Lost. And while it can be seen like that in some ways, it’s more so the establishment of Blxst as an artist. No Love Lost was the perfect introduction to the rising star’s sound and what he stood for, and Before You Go is the perfect follow-up that proves he’s here to stay." HipHopDX wrote about the album saying Blxst tapped "into a new level of creativity, an impressive feat given how polished his music already is. With all the early success he;s seen, the West Coast multi-hyphenate feels more excited than worried about the impact that Before You Go might have." Andy Kellman from Allmusic stated the album that "Blxst elevates his writing with a little more depth, detail, and subtle wordplay, and he keeps it straightforward, never pandering, whether examining himself or working through relationship matters in a conversational manner."

== Track listing ==
No.	Title	Writer(s)	Producer(s)	Length
1.	"Sky Lounge Music"	Matthew Burdette; Cheyenne Wright; Timothy Suby; Blake Straus	Tim Suby; Straus	0:42
2.	"Never Was Wrong"	Burdette; Straus; Suby	Blxst; Straus; Suby	2:47
3.	"About You"	Burdette; Christopher Wilson; Jared Grace; Joe Thomas; Joshua Thompson	Tharealcstylez; Tharealjfkbeatz	2:51
4.	"Fake Love in LA" (with Arin Ray)	Burdette; Carlos Muñoz; Rupert Thomas; Rogét Chahayed	Sevn Thomas; Chahayed; Los Hendrix	2:33
5.	"Pick Your Poison" (with Grandmaster Vic)	Burdette; John Groover; Michael Cox; Jarius Mozee; Victor Ekpo	Grandmaster Vic; Mike & Keys; J-Mo	2:54
6.	"Couldn't Wait for It" (with Rick Ross)	Burdette; Groover; Cox; Mozee	Mike & Keys; J-Mo	2:57
7.	"Still Omw"	Burdette; Ashton Sellars; Grace; Jorge Pilot	Blxst; the Eastie Boyz; J-Pilot; Sellars	1:55
8.	"Keep Comin' Back"	Burdette; Straus; Darius Wooten	Straus; D.Woo	2:25
9.	"Sometimes" (with Zacari)	Burdette; Zacari Pacaldo; Jahaan Sweet; Nick Monson; R. Thomas; Skyler Stonestreet	Sevn Thomas; Sweet	2:46
10.	"Every Good Girl"	Burdette; Groover; Cox; Mozee	Mike & Keys; J-Mo	2:56
11.	"Be Forreal"	Burdette; Leoren Davis	Blxst; Oh Gosh Leotus	2:49
12.	"Talk to Me Nicely"	Burdette; Wilson; Grace	Tharealcstylez; Tharealjfkbeatz	2:00
13.	"Let It Be Known"	Burdette; Marcus Jenkins	Blxst; Jenk	2:23
Total length:				32:24

=== Notes ===
- "About You" contains a sample of "Faded Pictures", written by Joe Thomas and Joshua Thompson, and performed by Case featuring Joe.

== Personnel ==
- Blxst – vocals (tracks 2–13)
- Cheyenne Wright – vocals (track 1)
- Arin Ray – vocals (track 4)
- Rick Ross – vocals (track 6)
- Zacari – vocals (track 9)
- Arin Paris – strings (track 1)

=== Technical ===
- Chris Athens – mastering engineer
- Lance Powell – mixing engineer
- Blxst – mixing engineer (tracks 2, 3, 7, 11–13)
- Dave Huffman – assistant mastering engineer
- Kurt Bradley – assistant mastering engineer

== Charts ==
Chart (2022)	Peak position
US Billboard 200	90
