= Loving Annabelle =

2006 film by Katherine Brooks

- Movie poster
- Directed by: Katherine Brooks
- Screenplay by: Katherine Brooks
- Produced by: Jennifer Young; Gregory Carroll
- Starring: Erin Kelly; Diane Gaidry
- Cinematography: Cynthia Pusheck
- Edited by: Lori Ball
- Music by: Aurah; Marc Dold; Judith Martin
- Production companies: Divine Light Pictures; Big Easy Pictures
- Distributed by: Wolfe Releasing (US); TLA Releasing (UK); Homescreen (Netherlands)
- Release dates: March 8, 2006 (Australia); March 10, 2006 (U.S.); May 20, 2006 (Canada)
- Running time: 76 minutes
- Country: United States
- Language: English
- Budget: $1 million (estimated)

Loving Annabelle is a 2006 American romantic drama film written and directed by Katherine Brooks. Inspired by the 1931 German film Mädchen in Uniform, it tells the story of a Catholic boarding school student who falls in love with her female teacher.

== Plot ==
Annabelle Tillman, the worldly and emotionally mature 17-year-old daughter of a senator, is sent to Saint Theresa's, an all-girls Catholic boarding school, after being expelled from two previous schools. Simone Bradley, a poetry teacher at the school, is in charge of her dormitory. Annabelle has roommates Catherine, who tends to bully people, and Colins, a nervous student.

Simone is a dependable teacher who occasionally bends the rules out of concern for her students. She generally abides by the conventions of society and her religion. Annabelle has unrestrained behavior and makes unconventional choices, often defying authority.

Annabelle is rebuked by the principal, Mother Immaculata, for flaunting her Buddhist prayer beads. Simone is told to control her. At first, Simone asks to have Annabelle moved to another dormitory but soon notices the girl's maturity and sensitivity. She convinces Annnabelle to comply with the school regulations. In the process, the girl falls in love with Simone.

Simone ignores Annabelle's delicate overtures. But when they are alone at the school during spring break, Simone takes Annabelle on a day trip to her beach house. There the girl discovers painful details about Simone's past, and holds the teacher when she breaks into tears. They form a deep emotional connection.

Simone struggles to resist Annabelle, but is eventually moved by her relentless pursuit. At the annual school dance, Annabelle sings on stage a song she wrote for Simone. The teacher runs outside, but Annabelle catches up with her. They kiss, and then go to Simone's room and make love.

The next morning Colins wonders where Annabelle is. Catherine has been watching and suspects what happened.

Out of spite, she tells Mother Immaculata to check at Simone's room. The pair are rushing to get dressed as Mother Immaculata walks in on them. She orders Simone to her office, where the teacher admits to loving Annabelle. Police detectives arrest Simone and, just as she is being taken away, Annabelle gives her the Buddhist prayer beads.

The film ends quoting Rainer Maria Rilke: "For one human being to love another that is perhaps the most difficult of all our tasks...the work for which all other work is but preparation."

== Cast ==
- Erin Kelly as Annabelle Tillman, a lesbian young woman in love with her teacher, Simone Bradley
- Diane Gaidry as Simone Bradley, a teacher who falls in love with her student, Annabelle
- Laura Breckenridge as Colins, a troubled girl who becomes Annabelle's friend
- Michelle Horn as Kristen, Catherine's best friend
- Gustine Fudickar as Catherine ("Cat"), a student who bullies her fellow pupils, especially Colins
- Ilene Graff as Mother Immaculata, school principal and Simone's aunt
- Markus Flanagan as Michael, Simone's ex-boyfriend
- Kevin McCarthy as Father Harris, the school priest

== Production ==
At the time of writing the script, writer and director Katherine Brooks said news stories of scandalous teacher-student relationships influenced the story. Brooks wanted to depict such a relationship between two women. Brooks believed that having the main characters be female made the dynamics of their relationship more socially acceptable than if either was male. She said, "I think that most would see a woman and girl connect in more of an 'emotional' way, a mother-figure type of relationship like in Maedchen [sic] in Uniform".

The film was developed over eight years. Diane Gaidry was not cast until three days before the start of filming.

The school scenes were filmed at Marymount High School in Los Angeles, California.

== Reception ==
Writing for The Spinning Image, Andrew Pragasam praised Brooks for "[steering] the subject away from male fantasy and [placing] the emphasis where it needs to be, on love. Some have criticised the seemingly squeaky clean, almost antiseptic tone to what is meant to be a torrid romance, but the film succeeds by being more emotionally than sexually provocative and intertwines too potentially transgressive ideas".

Nancy Amazon of Kissing Fingertips felt "a few more risks should have been taken, with the script and the direction...More should have been made of the claustrophobic atmosphere of the boarding school setting, to really make us feel how trapped Simone feels, how she's unable to breathe until Annabelle comes along to throw open a few windows." Critic Christopher Null bemoaned the film's third act, writing "Loving Annabelle gets interesting at the very moment the credits roll, and that's a shame, because it's otherwise a lush-looking film that has an extremely timely news hook to it."

Some critics pointed out the power dynamics of the relationship and said that the nature of their relationship is still inappropriate. Karman Kregloe of AfterEllen commented that while the film "sets up a complex moral quagmire", "Brooks doesn’t attempt to answer these questions for the viewer. She presents the material without sensationalism, and it’s up to us to pass judgment." She lauded the film for managing to avoid the "lesbian tragedy" trope and concluded the movie's "cinematography, strong acting and erotic charge will satisfy regardless of whether you think the lovers deserve ruination or redemption."

In 2020, Valerie Anne of Autostraddle acknowledged the importance of lesbian representation on screen while also noting the inherent power imbalance in the central relationship. She notes that the film does not skirt the negative consequences of such a relationship.

== Alternate ending ==
The DVD contains an alternate ending in which Annabelle is driving on a coast highway to an unknown destination. She stops at a road-side store and picks up a copy of a newspaper with the front page headline “No Charges To Be Filed In Teacher Student Sex Scandal”, and smiles. Annabelle is shown with her car parked on the side of the road, and her rushing down steps leading to Simone's beach house.

== Home media ==
The DVD for Region 1 was released by Wolfe Video on December 12, 2006. The Region 2 DVD was released by TLA Releasing on January 14, 2008.

== Accolades ==
Atlanta Film Festival

- 2006 Audience Award (Katherine Brooks)

Fort Worth Gay and Lesbian International Film Festival

- 2006 Q Award- Narrative Feature (Katherine Brooks)

L.A. Outfest

- 2006 Audience Award (Katherine Brooks)
- 2006 Grand Jury Award - Best Actress (Diane Gaidry)

Long Island Film Festival

- 2006 Audience Choice Award - Narrative Feature (Katherine Brooks)

Paris Cinema Festival

- 2006 Jury Award (Katherine Brooks)

== See also ==
- Bloomington (2010)
- List of LGBT-related films directed by women
