= The Dogwalker (2001 film) =

2001 film by Jacques Thelemaque

- Directed by: Jacques Thelemaque
- Starring: Diane Gaidry and Pamela Gordon
- Distributed by: Bigfoot Ascendant LLC
- Release date: 2001
- Running time: 99 minutes
- Country: United States
- Language: English

The Dogwalker is a 2001 film directed and produced by Jacques Thelemaque, starring Diane Gaidry (Ellie Moore) and Pamela Gordon (Betsy Wright).

The film closely observes the rocky relationship that develops between a destitute young woman (Diane Gaidry), who has fled her abusive boyfriend, and a reclusive, misanthropic professional dog walker (Pamela Gordon).

== Cast ==
- Diane Gaidry (Ellie Moore)
- Pamela Gordon (Betsy Wright)
- Lyn Vaus (Walter)
- Lisa Jane Persky (Alison)
- Alan Gelfant (Glen)
- John Nielson (Dave)
- Kerry Bishop (Amanda Singer)

== Production crew ==
- Director: Jacques Thelemaque
- Producers: Linda L. Miller, Hilary Six, Jacques Thelemaque
- Co-producers: Tori-Ann Parker, Diane Gaidry, Andrew M. Somers
- Executive Producers: David Diann, Thoms Gaidry
- Associate Producers: Willard Morgan, Michael Blaha
- Creative Collaborators: Sean Hood, Diane Gaidry
- Director of Photography: Marco Fargnoli
- Additional Photography: Toby Birney
- Editor: Jeff Orgill
- Production Coordinator: Destri Martino

== Awards ==
- Cinequest Film Festival '02 Best First Feature
- Ashland Independent Film Festival '04 Best Cinematography
- Hong Kong International Film Festival Official Selection
- Los Angeles Film Festival Official Selection
