= Face 2 Face (2012 American film) =

- Face 2 Face Poster
- Directed by: Katherine Brooks
- Produced by: Katherine Brooks, Cynthi Stefenoni
- Starring: Katherine Brooks and 50 Facebook Friends
- Cinematography: Maria T. Senger
- Edited by: Maria T. Senger
- Release date: June 3, 2012 (Dances With Films)
- Running time: 107 minutes
- Country: United States
- Language: English
- Budget: $+80,000

Face 2 Face is a feature-length documentary directed by Katherine Brooks who traveled around the US to meet 50 of her Facebook friends she met online. These 50 people were chosen when Brooks posted a status update on her Facebook page that asked who was willing to spend a day with her and she would come to them and film the whole process. At the end of the project, 6 out of the 50 stories were edited into a film that was submitted to Sundance. Additional profits from the project were to be donated to the Trevor Project.

== Theme ==
Society has evolved to reach the hearts of hundreds and to make people think and realize how much time is being spent on Facebook and Twitter when compared to the time spent with our friends and family. This is the main motive Katherine explored with the people to find the answer to the question: "How much has technology helped us or harmed us with strengthening our relationships with the people we love". Questions such as "Are we really friends? Do you really know me? Can I trust you? Are machines taking over? Are we losing our ability to connect with each other? Do other people feel alone in the world like me?" was being by Brooks as she noticed the time people spent on their phones and computers.

=== Beginning ===
In an interview given to Daily Brink during the Newport Beach Film Festival, Brooks explains how the idea for the project was born. Brooks said:

I was recovering from surgery and went into a very deep depression. I wasn't happy with my career or my personal life and I wanted a change. I had literally felt as though I had hit a brick wall and was ready to give up on life. That was when I was staring at my Facebook page in tears and looking at how many friends I had, yet I felt so alone and disconnected from the world. It was in that moment I really had an intense awakening that if I was at a point in my life where I was ready to throw in the towel, I might as well do something that scared me ... to connect with people face 2 face. And so I grabbed my flip camera in that moment and typed a status update that said the first 50 people that say YES I am coming to your town with my camera and spending a day with you. I had no idea how I was going to make it happen, I just felt an inner guidance that it was what I needed to do. Within 15 minutes I had my 50 people and it kept going and going. People were pleading for me to come to their town and I felt I wasn't the only one who craved a little human connection.

After receiving responses from more than 150 friends, the first 50 people were randomly chosen and then video journals about who is part of the project and which cities she was to travel were posted on Facebook and Twitter. The next step was to raise enough money to make the project successful.

=== Kickstarter ===
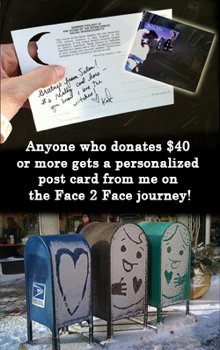
Handing out Rewards for the Donations, 2011

The Kickstarter campaign lasted for over a month. From the generous donations and contributions by Brooks's friends, family, and sponsors, a total of more than $80,000 was funded successfully. The moment the campaigning began, the project raised more than $10,000 in just a week. During the campaigning, various kinds of rewards were announced and these rewards were chosen by the contributors according to the amount given. Rewards included a shout-out video, signed NOH8 photo-shoot pictures, spending a day with Brooks or a co-producer credit in the film. Also, text and video journals were posted to keep all the members updated on the progression and changes in the project.

Within three weeks of the campaigning, the project was successfully funded to its target goal of $50,000. But the contributions kept going on until the last hour of the period given. During this time, different forms of planning on how the film will be shot were declared. Some included hosting a first-ever 24 hours live documentary show, traveling around the country in an RV with the Face 2 Face designs on it, beanie hats with tiny cameras fitted inside, and so on. These proposals were posted as video journals by Katherine Brooks. But these were abandoned due to the staggering expense.

== Filming ==
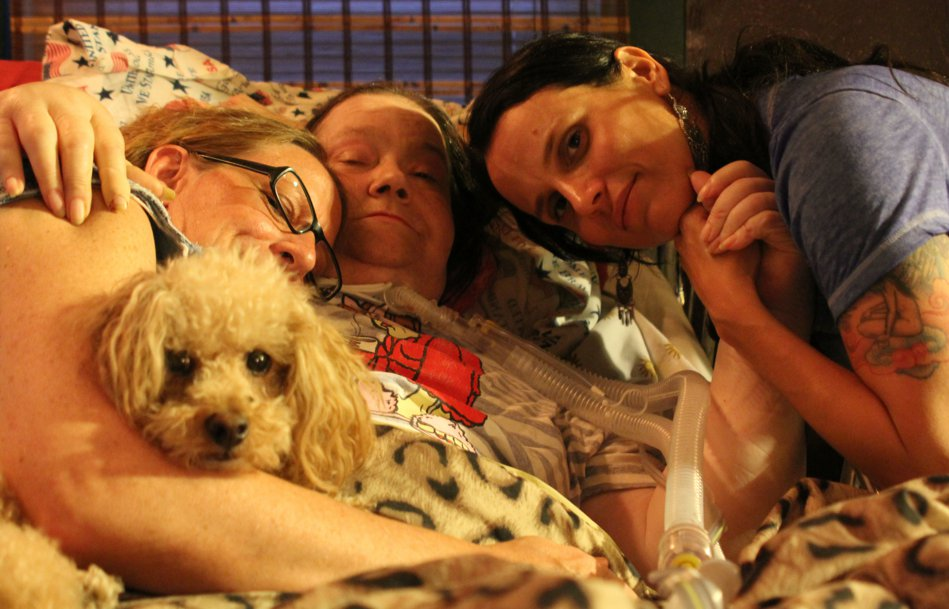
Katherine Brooks with her second Facebook Friend, 2011

The filming of the project began in the first week of June. The first of the 50 friends Brooks met was in Fort Wayne, Indiana. After two weeks of driving around the east coast, Brooks has traveled to New York, Maine, New Hampshire, Massachusetts, and Rhode Island. She will also be traveling around Colorado, North Carolina, Texas, and California. The completion of the shooting for Face 2 Face was to be marked when she heads back to her home in New Orleans.

== Impact ==
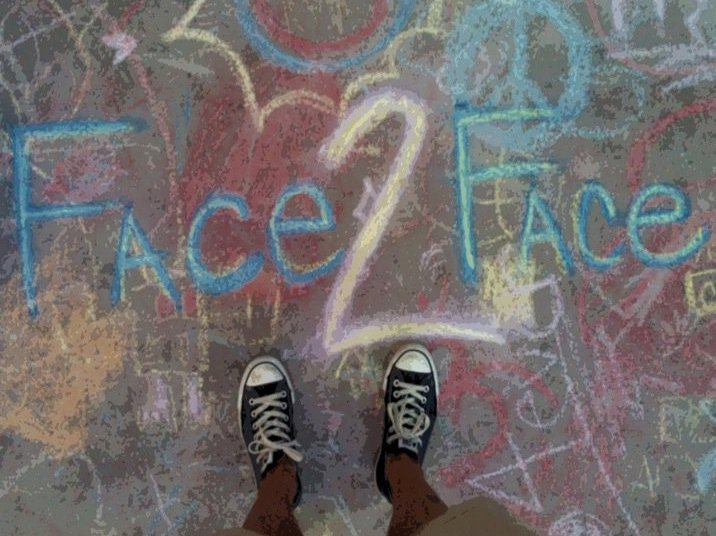
Artworks for Face 2 Face, 2011

There was some discussion about the film on Facebook and Twitter. People were writing and sharing stories about how they found love and support through people they met from the project. These mutual Friends formed a group called the "Kat Pack". Brooks talked about the "Kat Pack" in interviews given to various radio shows such as LA Talk Radio with Sheena Metal, HayHouse Radio, and Talk Radio Europe.

Also, a Face 2 Face forum was developed by the team where followers are able to share personal stories, secrets, jokes, and give advice, support, and love to the people who need it. Through this blog, many people are sharing adventures they would have never shared intimately with anyone in their life. This project has shown how deeply connected everyone can be, even though the medium is technology.

=== Press ===
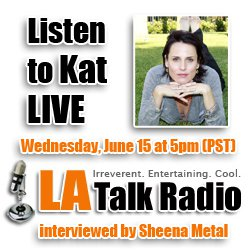
One of the Interviews given in a radio talk show, 2011

Ever since the idea for Face 2 Face was born, there were press releases and publicity for the project, starting during the pre-production stage. Brooks gave various interviews to newspapers and journals, such as USA Today, Examiner.com, The Saratogian, and Daily Brink. Apart from these online blogs, articles about the movie appeared in The Salem News, SheWired, and so on. Brooks also appeared on radio talk shows, where she talked about the journey of Face 2 Face and the importance of it to her life and the "Kat Pack". Shows include LA Talk Radio, CBS Sky Radio with Zoe Moon, Wakin' Up with the Wolf, and Talk Radio Europe.

In an interview given to The Saratogian, a local newspaper in Saratoga Springs, New York, Brooks described her feelings and experiences after a week of traveling around the east coast. This interview was given during her visit to one of the Facebook Friends. In the article, she says there are different types of friendships one makes in their lifetime. There are friends whom you will spend time to just have a coffee, some you keep in touch through the various social networking sites, and others you add in your speed dial. Through this journey, Brooks recounts, she had added every friend she has met in her speed dial.

In another interview, Brooks explained her feelings for today's vast technological changes and her feelings on how it impacts our lives. She states:

Because you can't feel emotion through a machine. We spend more time with technology than we do with one another and I believe it's a major cause of isolation and depression. At least it was for me. I used my computer to hide from the world because I was scared of getting hurt. I'm not scared anymore and I want to inspire other people to step away from their keyboards and go connect with others.

In every interview given by Brooks, she clearly states that the purpose of the movie is to show people how important it really is to take some time off from the virtual world and instead, spending time with the people that matter to us the most in life. Friendships and relationships created online can not be fully trusted as you can be vulnerable to various faults and can cause harm to oneself and to others too. Also, the human body is like a machine that desires to be touched once in a while to experience the feeling of being loved.
