= Chosen (Blxst song) =

2021 song by Blxst and Tyga featuring Ty Dolla Sign

Single by Blxst and Tyga featuring Ty Dolla Sign

from the EP No Love Lost
- Released: December 4, 2020
- Genre: West Coast hip hop; pop rap; pop; R&B
- Length: 2:41
- Label: Red Bull; Evgle
- Songwriters: Christopher Wilson; Jared William Grace; Matthew Burdette; Michael Ray; Tyrone Griffin
- Producers: Blxst; Tharealcstylez; Tharealjfkbeatz

Blxst singles chronology
| "Be Alone" (2020) | "Chosen" (2020) | "Don't Forget" (2021) |

Tyga singles chronology
| "Krabby Step" (2020) | "Chosen" (2020) | "Spicy (Remix)" (2021) |

Ty Dolla Sign singles chronology
| "Gotta Love It" (2020) | "Chosen" (2020) | "The Business, Part II" (2021) |

Music video
- "Chosen" on YouTube

"Chosen" is a song by American rapper and singer Blxst and fellow American rapper Tyga featuring fellow American singer Ty Dolla Sign. It was released as a single from the deluxe version of Blxst's debut EP No Love Lost on December 4, 2020, through Red Bull Records and Evgle. In 2021, the song garnered attention due to Internet memes on TikTok, later gaining over 150 million views.

== Background ==
The song contains a guitar sample from Electric Soul - Guitar Loops and Riffs by Treehouz. Blxst told Billboard that working on the song was just "a normal day", explaining: "I was just working. It felt fun creating it. Something about it felt different. It gave a different energy as I was recording it. Then Ty Dolla Sign laid his verse, and it was all up from there."

== Music video ==
An accompanying video was released on March 25, 2021. According to a press release from Red Bull Records, the inspiration behind the video was three college films: School Daze (1988), Love & Basketball (2000) and Stomp the Yard (2007). It shows the three artists holding a party at "Evgle University", "tailgating with cheerleaders at football games to partying at frat houses with the step team". As of August 2022, the video has over 65 million views.

== Live performance ==
On November 4, 2021, Blxst and Ty Dolla Sign performed the song on The Tonight Show Starring Jimmy Fallon.

== Credits and personnel ==
Credits adapted from Tidal and WhoSampled.

- Blxst – producer, composer
- Tharealcstylez – producer
- Tharealjfkbeatz – producer
- Treehouz - producer
- Christopher Wilson – composer
- Jeremy Lawrence - composer
- Jared William Grace – composer
- Michael Ray – composer
- Tyrone Griffin – composer

== Charts ==
=== Weekly charts ===
Weekly chart performance for "Chosen"
| Chart (2021–2022) | Peak position |
|---|---|
| Canada Hot 100 (Billboard) | 94 |
| Canada CHR/Top 40 (Billboard) | 46 |
| Germany (GfK) | 47 |
| Global 200 (Billboard) | 101 |
| Ireland (IRMA) | 76 |
| Netherlands (Single Top 100) | 78 |
| New Zealand (Recorded Music NZ) | 29 |
| Sweden Heatseeker (Sverigetopplistan) | 4 |
| Switzerland (Schweizer Hitparade) | 62 |
| UK Singles (Official Charts) | 42 |
| US Billboard Hot 100 | 51 |
| US Hot R&B/Hip-Hop Songs (Billboard) | 11 |
| US Pop Airplay (Billboard) | 23 |
| US Rhythmic Airplay (Billboard) | 1 |

=== Year-end charts ===
2022 year-end chart performance for "Chosen"
| Chart (2022) | Position |
|---|---|
| US Hot R&B/Hip-Hop Songs (Billboard) | 72 |
| US Rhythmic (Billboard) | 7 |
| US Radio Songs (Billboard) | 49 |

== Certifications ==
Certifications for "Chosen"
| Region | Certification | Certified units/sales |
|---|---|---|
| Australia (ARIA) | 2× Platinum | 140,000^{‡} |
| Canada (Music Canada) | Platinum | 80,000^{‡} |
| Denmark (IFPI Danmark) | Gold | 45,000^{‡} |
| New Zealand (RMNZ) | Platinum | 30,000^{‡} |
| Norway (IFPI Norway) | Gold | 30,000^{‡} |
| United Kingdom (BPI) | Gold | 400,000^{‡} |
| United States (RIAA) | Platinum | 1,000,000^{‡} |
Streaming
| Sweden (GLF) | Gold | 4,000,000^{†} |
^{‡} Sales+streaming figures based on certification alone.^{†} Streaming-only figures based on certification alone.

== Release history ==
Release history for "Chosen"
| Region | Date | Format | Label | Ref. |
|---|---|---|---|---|
| Various | December 4, 2020 | Digital download; streaming | Red Bull; Evgle | |
| United States | July 13, 2021 | Rhythmic contemporary | Red Bull; Evgle | |
