= Cynthia Pusheck =

American film and television cinematographer

Cynthia Pusheck (born 1964) is an American film and television cinematographer. She co-founded and co-chairs the ASC Vision committee that supports people from underrepresented groups who hope to build a career in cinematography. She was the first woman to serve as vice-president of the American Society of Cinematographers (ASC).

== Early life ==
Cynthia Pusheck was born in the Chicago area, and was raised in Rockford, Illinois. She attended Columbia College Chicago before moving to Los Angeles.

== Cinematography ==
As a camera assistant, Pusheck specialised in underwater cinematography under the guidance of Peter Romano. She worked on Free Willy, White Squall, Flipper, Waterworld, Alien Resurrection, Speed 2: Cruise Control, Baywatch and Sphere. She was the camera operator on the underwater sequences in Magnolia, Men of Honor, Tomorrow Never Dies and A Nightmare on Elm Street.

She took a job as a camera operator on CSI: Miami in 2003, where she gained her first experience as a Director of Photography (DP) on the second unit. Puskheck then studied cinematography at the American Film Institute for a year to improve her qualifications as a cinematographer.

Pusheck has been DP on a range of television/streaming shows, most notably Brothers and Sisters, Revenge, Good Girls Revolt, Strange Angel, Sacred Lies, and The Bold Type. She has also been DP on the independent feature film Loving Annabelle.

Pusheck joined the American Society of Cinematographers (ASC) in 2013, and became the first woman to be elected vice president in 2017. She held the VP role until 2019.

== Recognition ==
Pusheck received the Kodak Vision Award at the 2010 Women in Film Crystal + Lucy Awards.

== Filmography ==
- Marisol (2002)
- Three Days of Rain (2002) - feature film
- Coachella (2006) - documentary film
- Loving Annabelle (2006) - feature film
- Brothers and Sisters (2006) - TV series
- Revenge (2011-2015) - TV series
- Good Girls Revolt (2016) - TV series
- Strange Angel (2018–19) - TV series
- Sacred Lies (2018) - TV series
- The Bold Type (2017-2021) - TV series
- Our Flag Means Death (2022-2023) - TV series
- Ballard (2025) - TV series
