= Jacques Thelemaque =

American screenwriter and director

Jacques Thelemaque (/ˈtɛləmæk/ TEL-ə-mak) is an American screenwriter and director best known as the president of the Los Angeles film collective Filmmakers Alliance.

== Biography ==
Thelemaque attended the USC School of Cinematic Arts and in 1993 when he co-founded Filmmakers Alliance with his then-wife, Diane Gaidry.

In 2004, he and producing partner Liam Finn formed FA Productions, of which they are Co-Presidents. Thelemaque himself - and through FA Productions - has produced several feature films including Shock Television, The Dogwalker (which he also wrote and directed), Within, Midnight Movie, and The Revenant. He is also a co-producer on Brooklyn Reptyle’s Audie & the Wolf.

In 2005, he was named Chief Community Officer of thewebsite, Withoutabox.com, but left prior to them being acquired by the Internet Movie Database.

As a writer-director his credits include the shorts Transaction, Infidelity (in equal parts), Egg and Love Without Socks.

He was on the board of directors for The Los Angeles Independent Film Festival (now Film Independent's Los Angeles Film Festival) and has been on the advisory board of the IFP Emerging Filmmaker Labs as well as the boards of the Downtown Film Festival and the Ashland Independent Film Festival.
