= Diane Gaidry =

American actress (1964–2019)

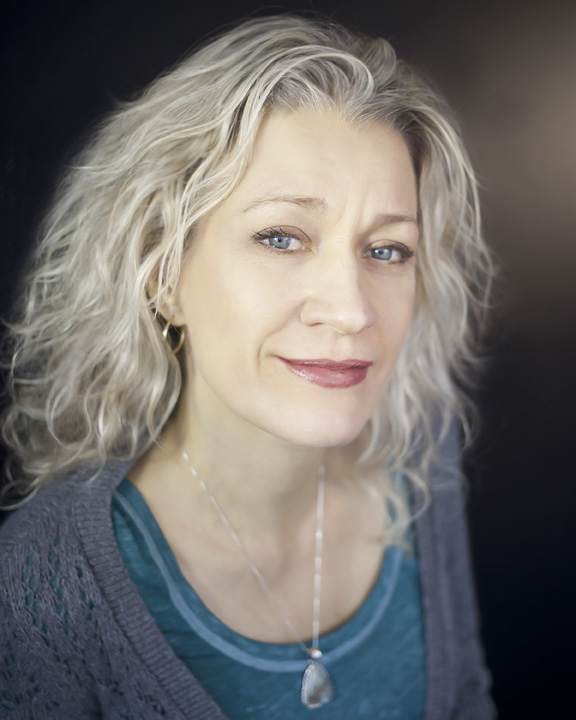
- Gaidry in 2013
- Born: October 11, 1964; Ellsworth Air Force Base, Rapid City, South Dakota, U.S.
- Died: January 30, 2019 (aged 54)
- Occupations: Actress, filmmaker, life coach
- Spouse(s): Jacques Thelemaque; Thomas Walker

Diane Adair Gaidry (October 11, 1964 – January 30, 2019) was an American film and theatre actress.

She is best known for the character Simone in Loving Annabelle, and she starred in The Dogwalker, directed by Jacques Thelemaque. She also supported and forwarded film as co-creator and executive director of the independent filmmaker collective, Filmmakers Alliance.

Gaidry died on January 30, 2019, from liver failure after a battle with cancer.

== Early life ==
Gaidry was born October 11, 1964, on Ellsworth Air Force Base in Rapid City, S.D., the daughter of Barbara (née Cunningham) and Thomas Gaidry, and sister of Brian Gaidry. Diane grew up in Buffalo, New York.

She moved to Snyder, New York, in her youth and attended Amherst Junior and Senior high schools before graduating from the Buffalo Academy for Visual and Performing Arts in 1982. She earned a bachelor's degree in acting from the New York University Tisch School of the Arts.

== Acting career ==
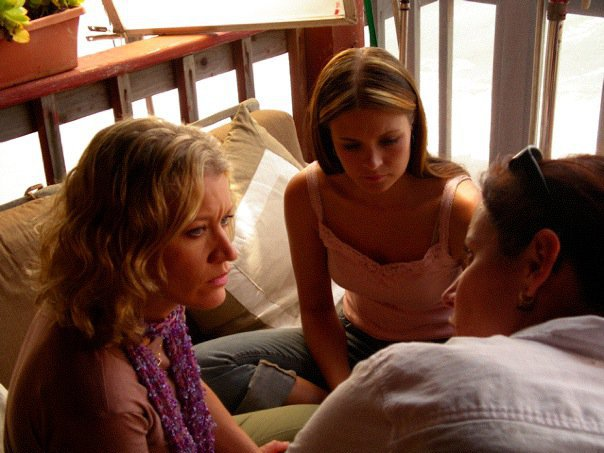
Diane Gaidry, Erin Kelly, and Katherine Brooks (director) on the set of Loving Annabelle.

Diane portrayed Simone Bradley in 2006 film Loving Annabelle directed by Katherine Brooks. Her characterization won her the Grand Jury Award for Outstanding Actress at L.A. Outfest. Gaidry was probably best known for her portrayal of this character.

In 1993, she co-founded the non-profit, Los Angeles based, independent filmmaking collective, Filmmakers Alliance. She also performed lead roles in some of the feature-length films that came out of the collective, including The Dogwalker, which played at the Los Angeles Film Festival and won Best First Feature at Cinequest and America So Beautiful, which played at the Berlinale, and was theatrically released in Paris. Her short film performance credits included “Transaction” which won the Grand Prix du Jury at Clermont-Ferrand. She also acted in maverick filmmaker, Rob Nilsson's feature, Need. During her two decades in Los Angeles, Gaidry also did several guest appearances on television shows, including the hit series, Medium.

In later years Gaidry made her home in Buffalo, NY where she grew up, and performed on stage with some of Buffalo's local theatre companies.

Gaidry appeared in many theatrical productions in Buffalo, NY over the years, mostly with cutting-edge Torn Space Theater, where she appeared in Storehouse, Motion Picture, Uncle Vanya, Blood on the Cat's Neck, He Who Gets Slapped, Procession and Trace. At Subversive Theatre, she appeared in In the Beginning, and for the Irish Classical Theatre Co., she played Dona Lucia in Charley's Aunt and Mary Tyrone in Eugene O'Neill's Long Day's Journey Into Night, as well as running her life coaching business, Vérité. In 2012, Gaidry acted in We Are Not Afraid of the Dark and performed in six cities in Europe.

== Additional artistic projects ==
Gaidry starred in the music video for "Here Waiting" with Mishaele Richardson and Emovere.

She also starred in the "Bravado- Passenger" music video.

Gaidry participated in a film project, the 3600 series, by photographer and artist Tania Saraiva in which Saraiva documented an authentic hour of Gaidry's life.

Gaidry participated in a narrative short video, "Soliel".

== Life coach ==
Gaidry received a Bachelor of Fine Arts in acting from New York University Tisch School of the Arts and received a master's degree in psychology from the University of Santa Monica.

She opened a life coaching business, Verite, in Buffalo New York in 2008. The name of her business, Verite, was inspired by the film genre cinéma vérité.

Gaidry stated, "Verite is truth. By aligning more consistently with our authentic self, we connect more fully with our joy, passion, and sense of purpose. We experience greater fulfillment, grace, abundance, and ease. We are in the flow. Through weekly or bi- weekly coaching conversations, I assist my clients in identifying their authentic voice as opposed to the voice of the inner critic. I hold a safe space for my clients to examine and challenge perspectives and patterns that may be limiting their fulfillment and joy. We are living in a time of profound change, uncertainty, and transformation and many of us are experiencing tremendous upheaval in our lives as a result. What if you could “be the change you want to see in the world”? Each and every one of us has valuable gifts to share with each other and the world. What are your unique strengths, passions, and gifts? Are you sharing them fully? How would your life and the lives of everyone you meet be enriched if you were living your truth? What could the world look like when you feel more empowered and are empowering others to share their gifts?"

== Personal life ==
Gaidry was married twice. She was first married to the Filmmakers Alliance co-creator and director Jacques Thelemaque.

Her second husband was Thomas K. Walker. She had two stepdaughters, Bella and Tess Walker, and one stepson, Ian Walker, via her second marriage.

== Illness and death ==
Gaidry was diagnosed with metastatic breast cancer, known as HER2-positive, in January 2018. She was determined to be "cancer free" in August 2018 only to have the cancer return and spread to her brain and other parts of her body. She used both holistic and traditional approaches to treatment.

She noted, "I’ve learned a lot and in many ways, I’m grateful to the cancer for serving as such a powerful teacher. I’ve learned that regardless of whether or not something has been said a million times before, it has not been said from my perspective and voice. I’ve learned that there are no guarantees that I will have a voice tomorrow or next week or next year, so if I have something to say, I might want to do that today".

She also stated, "If I hadn’t had the tools and the perspective from being a coach, I wouldn’t have seen this cancer as an opportunity and a gift. It’s not the most fun gift, but it has deepened my awareness and perspective that there’s possibilities in dark times. This journey has changed me forever, and I appreciate my life, the blessings, the people, and every moment now in a way that I couldn’t have before. It’s beautiful.”

She died on January 30, 2019, at home surrounded by family and friends.

== Filmography ==
- Summer Dreams: The Story of the Beach Boys (1990) as Shawn
- Frankenstein: The College Years (1991) as Friend
- Ed McBain's 87th Precinct: Lightning (1995) (TV) as Annie
- The Shy and the Naked (1998) as Party Girl
- Love Without Socks (1998)
- Egg (2001) as Greta
- America So Beautiful (2001) as Lucy
- The Dogwalker (2002) as Ellie
- Birth of Industry (2004) as Maya
- The Act (2004) as Waitress
- Transaction (2005) as Angela
- Need (2005) as Petite
- Medium (TV), 1 episode (2005) as Nurse
- Loving Annabelle (2006) as Simone Bradley
- Concerned Lady for America (2006) as Beverly
- The Rainbow Bridge Motel (2018) as Lidia
