= Tina Albanese =

American television producer and television writer

- Occupations: Television producer, television writer
- Years active: 1992–present
- Spouse: Patrick Labyorteaux (m. 1998)
- Children: 1

Tina Albanese is an American television producer and television writer, known for See Dad Run.

== Career ==
Albanese worked as a production assistant on the David E. Kelley-produced series L.A. Law, Picket Fences and as a post-production coordinator on Picket Fences and Chicago Hope. She was a consultant during the first season of CSI: Crime Scene Investigation and a post-production coordinator and associate producer on JAG, co-starring her husband Patrick Labyorteaux.

In 2012, Albanese and Labyorteaux created the Nick at Nite series See Dad Run, starring Scott Baio, which ran for three seasons.

== Personal life ==
Albanese and Labyorteaux married in 1998; they have one child together, a son named Jeau.
