= Blxst =

American rapper (born 1992)

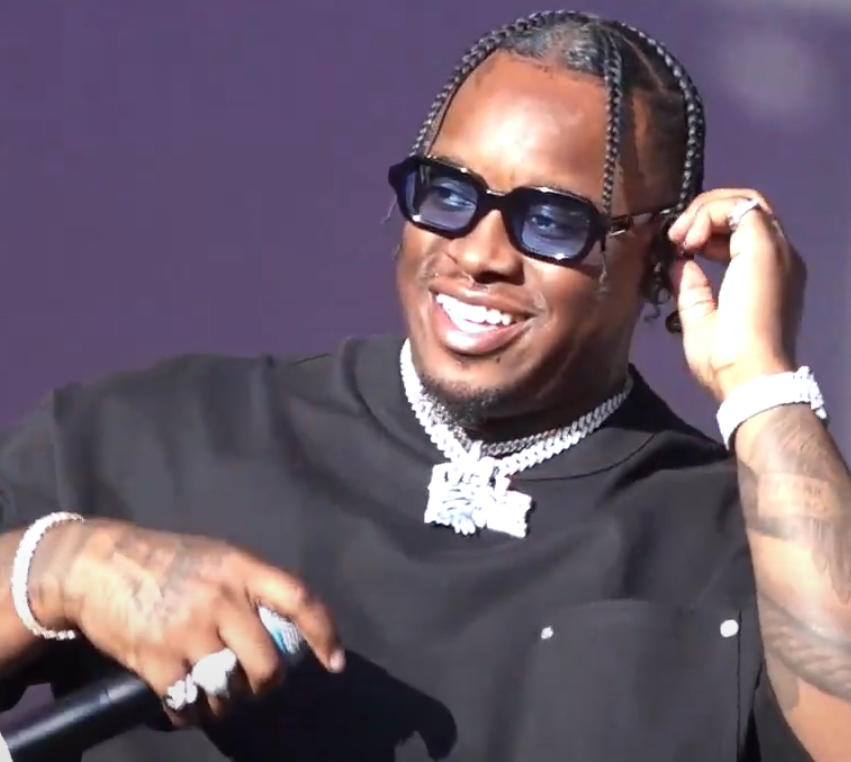
- Blxst in 2022

Background information
- Born: Matthew Dean Burdette; September 17, 1992 (age 34); Los Angeles, California, U.S.
- Genres: Hip-hop; R&B
- Occupations: Rapper; singer; songwriter; record producer
- Years active: 2014–present
- Labels: Evgle; Red Bull; EMPIRE
- Website: blxst.com

Matthew Dean Burdette (born September 17, 1992), known professionally as Blxst (pronounced "blast"), is an American rapper, singer, songwriter, and record producer from Los Angeles, California. He released his debut extended play (EP), No Love Lost (2020). It spawned the single "Chosen" (featuring Tyga and Ty Dolla Sign), which peaked at number 51 on the Billboard Hot 100 and received platinum certification by the Recording Industry Association of America (RIAA). His 2022 single, "Die Hard" (with Kendrick Lamar and Amanda Reifer) peaked at number five on the chart and remains his highest-charting song.

His debut mixtape, Before You Go (2022), was released in April of that year and entered the Billboard 200, while his studio album, I'll Always Come Find You (2024), failed to chart.

== Early life ==
Burdette grew up in South Central Los Angeles. He began rapping and producing shortly after he finished high school.

== Career ==
=== 2014–2021: No Love Lost and Sixtape series ===
Blxst launched his music career with a hip-hop collective called TIU Muzic, where he garnered a local following. In 2014, Blxst produced "Do Yo Gudda (Remix)" by Hitta J3 (featuring Kendrick Lamar, YG, and Problem). In 2015, he founded his label Evgle, and became a creative director for his graphic design and music videos. Blxst released his first song "Who Would've Thought" in 2016, followed by a string of independent singles in 2018 including a collaboration with Eric Bellinger. In 2019, he released his first solo hit single called "Hurt", which garnered millions of streams. On August 28, 2019, he released a collaboration EP with Bino Rideaux titled Sixtape.

In 2020, Blxst and his Evgle label signed to Red Bull Records. The label released his debut extended play No Love Lost on September 4, featuring the singles "Overrated", "No Love Lost", and "Be Alone". The EP peaked at number three on the Billboard Heatseekers chart. A deluxe edition was released on December 4, with additional features from Ty Dolla Sign, Tyga, Dom Kennedy, and Bino Rideaux. On March 12, 2021, he released a two-track EP titled Just for Clarity, featuring "Don't Forget" (with Drakeo the Ruler) and "Fck Boys" (with Russ). That same year, he was named to XXL's Annual Freshman Class and released Sixtape 2 with Bino Rideaux on July 16.

=== 2022–present: Before You Go and I'll Always Come Find You ===
On April 22, 2022, Blxst released his debut mixtape, Before You Go, which reached number 90 on the Billboard 200. Shortly after, he appeared on Kendrick Lamar's album Mr. Morale & the Big Steppers on the song "Die Hard". In 2023, he released the EP Just for Clarity 2 and collaborated with Killer Mike on "Exit 9".

Blxst's studio album, I'll Always Come Find You, was released on July 19, 2024, through Red Bull Records and Evgle. The 20-track concept album featured guest appearances from Anderson .Paak, Offset, and Ty Dolla Sign. In support of the album, he embarked on the 30-date "I'll Always Come Find You Tour" from October to December 2024. A deluxe edition of the album followed on November 22, 2024. In May 2025, he released a four-song EP titled Unreleased, preceded by the singles "Aye Girl" and "Why".

== Artistry ==
Blxst grew up listening to West Coast hip hop with influences from Ryan Leslie, Pharrell Williams, and Kanye West. His musical style has been compared to West Coast rapping and singing hybrids such as Ty Dolla Sign and Nate Dogg.

== Discography ==
=== Studio albums ===
Title	Details
I'll Always Come Find You	Released: July 19, 2024; Label: Evgle, Red Bull; Format: Digital download, streaming

=== Mixtapes ===
Title	Details	Peak chart positions
Title	Details	US
Before You Go	Released: April 22, 2022; Label: Evgle, Red Bull; Format: Digital download, streaming	90

=== Extended plays ===
Title	Details	Peak chart positions	
Title	Details	US Heat.	NLD
No Love Lost	Released: September 4, 2020; Label: Evgle, Red Bull; Format: Digital download, streaming	3	69
Just for Clarity	Released: March 12, 2021; Label: Evgle, Red Bull; Format: Digital download, streaming	—	—
Just for Clarity 2	Released: March 10, 2023; Label: Evgle, Red Bull; Format: Digital download, streaming	—	—
Unreleased	Released: May 13, 2025; Label: Evgle; Format: Streaming	—	—
"—" denotes a recording that did not chart or was not released.

=== Collaboration albums ===
Title	Details	Peak chart positions
Title	Details	US
Sixtape (with Bino Rideaux)	Released: August 28, 2019; Label: Evgle, Out the Blue; Format: Digital download, streaming	—
Sixtape 2 (with Bino Rideaux)	Released: July 16, 2021; Label: Evgle, Out the Blue, Red Bull, Def Jam; Format: Digital download, streaming	117
Sixtape 3 (with Bino Rideaux)	Released: September 1, 2023; Label: Evgle, Out the Blue, Red Bull, Def Jam; Format: Digital download, streaming	—
"—" denotes a recording that did not chart or was not released.

=== Singles ===
==== As lead artist ====
Title	Year	Peak chart positions										Certifications	Album
Title	Year	US	AUS	CAN	DEN	GER	IRE	NLD	NZ	SWE	UK	Certifications	Album
"Headshots"	2018	—	—	—	—	—	—	—	—	—	—		Non-album singles
"Act Like You Know"	2018	—	—	—	—	—	—	—	—	—	—		Non-album singles
"Nothin' 2 Somethin'"	2018	—	—	—	—	—	—	—	—	—	—		Non-album singles
"Can I" (featuring Eric Bellinger)	2018	—	—	—	—	—	—	—	—	—	—		Non-album singles
"Hurt"	2019	—	—	—	—	—	—	—	—	—	—		No Love Lost
"Slip & Slide" (featuring 1TakeJay)	2019	—	—	—	—	—	—	—	—	—	—		Non-album single
"Savage" (with Bino Rideaux)	2019	—	—	—	—	—	—	—	—	—	—		Sixtape
"Selfish" (with Bino Rideaux)	2020	—	—	—	—	—	—	—	—	—	—		Sixtape
"Overrated"	2020	—	—	—	—	—	—	—	—	—	—	RIAA: Gold; RMNZ: Platinum	No Love Lost
"No Love Lost"	2020	—	—	—	—	—	—	—	—	—	—		No Love Lost
"Be Alone"	2020	—	—	—	—	—	—	—	—	—	—	RIAA: Gold	No Love Lost
"Chosen" (with Tyga featuring Ty Dolla Sign)	2021	51	—	94	—	47	76	87	30	— (Note: "Chosen" did not enter the Swedish Singellista Chart, but peaked at number four on the Sweden Heatseeker Chart.)	42	RIAA: Platinum; ARIA: 2× Platinum; BPI: Gold; GLF: Gold; IFPI DEN: Gold; MC: Platinum; RMNZ: Platinum	No Love Lost
"Don't Forget" (featuring Drakeo the Ruler)	2021	—	—	—	—	—	—	—	—	—	—		Just for Clarity
"Fck Boys" (featuring Russ)	2021	—	—	—	—	—	—	—	—	—	—		Just for Clarity
"Movie" (with Bino Rideaux)	2021	—	—	—	—	—	—	—	—	—	—		Sixtape 2
"One of Them Ones" (with Bino Rideaux)	2021	—	—	—	—	—	—	—	—	—	—		Sixtape 2
"About You"	2021	—	—	—	—	—	—	—	— (Note: "About You" did not enter the NZ Top 40 Singles Chart, but peaked at number 26 on the NZ Hot Singles Chart.)	—	—	RIAA: Gold	Before You Go
"Peru (Remix)" (with Fireboy DML and 21 Savage)	2022	-	-	-	-	-	-	-	-	-	-		Non-album single
"Sometimes" (with Zacari)	2022	—	—	—	—	—	—	—	— (Note: "Sometimes" did not enter the NZ Top 40 Singles Chart, but peaked at number 31 on the NZ Hot Singles Chart.)	—	—		Before You Go
"Die Hard" (with Kendrick Lamar and Amanda Reifer)	2022	5	5	5	22	—	6	39	6	23	7	ARIA: Platinum; BPI: Silver	Mr. Morale & the Big Steppers
"Keep Calling" (with Larry June)	2022	—	—	—	—	—	—	—	— (Note: "Keep Calling" did not enter the NZ Top 40 Singles Chart, but peaked at number 38 on the NZ Hot Singles Chart.)	—	—		Just for Clarity 2
"Passionate" (featuring Roddy Ricch)	2023	—	—	—	—	—	—	—	— (Note: "Passionate" did not enter the NZ Top 40 Singles Chart, but peaked at number 33 on the NZ Hot Singles Chart.)	—	—		Just for Clarity 2
"Doin Yo Stuff" (with Bino Rideaux)	2023	—	—	—	—	—	—	—	— (Note: "Doin Yo Stuff" did not enter the NZ Top 40 Singles Chart, but peaked at number 38 on the NZ Hot Singles Chart.)	—	—		Sixtape 3
"Dance with the Devil" (with Anderson .Paak)	2024	—	—	—	—	—	—	—	— (Note: "Dance with the Devil" did not enter the NZ Top 40 Singles Chart, but peaked at number 39 on the NZ Hot Singles Chart.)	—	—		I'll Always Come Find You
"Aye Girl"	2025	—	—	—	—	—	—	—	—	—	—		TBA
"Why"	2025	—	—	—	—	—	—	—	— (Note: "Why" did not enter the NZ Top 40 Singles Chart, but peaked at number 13 on the NZ Hot Singles Chart.)	—	—		TBA
"—" denotes a recording that did not chart or was not released.

==== As featured artist ====
List of singles as a featured artist, showing year released and album name
Title	Year	Album
"I Ain't Perfect" (Mozzy featuring Blxst)	2020	Beyond Bulletproof
"Brand New" (Bino Rideaux featuring Blxst)	2020	Outside
"Streets Ain't Safe" (Mozzy featuring Blxst)	2020	Occupational Hazard
"Perfect Timing" (YG and Mozzy featuring Blxst)	2021	Kommunity Service
"Chose Me" (Blueface featuring Blxst)	2021	Fan or Opp
"One Shot" (Murda Beatz featuring Blxst and Wale)	2022	Keep God First 2
"Nice" (Young T & Bugsey featuring Blxst)	2022	Truth Be Told
"Wait Too Long" (Buddy featuring Blxst)	2022	Superghetto

=== Other charted songs ===
Title	Year	Peak chart positions	Album
Title	Year	NZ Hot	Album
"Go to War" (with Snoop Dogg)	2021	39	Snoop Dogg Presents Algorithm
"Still OMW"	2022	40	Before You Go
"Every Good Girl"	2022	30	Before You Go
"Show It" (Chris Brown featuring Blxst)	2022	9	Breezy

=== Guest appearances ===
List of non-single guest appearances, with other performing artists, showing year released and album name
Title	Year	Other artist(s)	Album
"Gotta Go"	2018	Blaq Thompson	—N/a
"Straight"	2018	D.Woo, Kent Jones	—N/a
"Feeling My Vibe"	2019	Blaq Thompson	—N/a
"Midnight"	2019	Joe Maynor, Mike Sherm	—N/a
"Whats the Point"	2019	Joey Fatts	—N/a
"I'm On 10"	2020	King Envy, Nikko Mae	—N/a
"Research"	2020	Narissa	—N/a
"Heroic"	2020	MBNel	Child of the Trenches
"Wop Wop (Remix)"	2020	KB Devaughn, Boogie	—N/a
"Keep It 100"	2020	Cuuhraig	—N/a
"Keep Hope"	2020	Mozzy	—N/a
"Don't Play Fair"	2020	Mozzy, Wale	Occupational Hazard
"Understand"	2020	Rucci	Midget
"Alone"	2020	Nieman J, Eric Bellinger	Optimal Music
"Still"	2020	E-40, Drakeo the Ruler	Ain't Gone Do It / Terms and Conditions
"When Eye Fall"	2021	Souloho, Fentse Keyz	—N/a
"Priority"	2021	Jayson Cash	—N/a
"Brunch on Sundays"	2021	Nas	King's Disease II
"Overnight"	2021	Dame D.O.L.L.A.	Different on Levels the Lord Allowed
"We the Ones"	2021	Dame D.O.L.L.A., Tree Thomas	Different on Levels the Lord Allowed
"Specific"	2021	Shordie Shordie	—N/a
"Made It Out Alive"	2021	Rick Ross	Richer Than I Ever Been
"For Me"	2022	Pink Sweats	Pink Moon
"Any Given Sunday"	2022	Kehlani	Blue Water Road
"Die Hard"	2022	Kendrick Lamar, Amanda Reifer	Mr. Morale & the Big Steppers
"Bad Idea"	2022	Arin Ray	Hello Poison
"Show It"	2022	Chris Brown	Breezy
"No Stoppin"	2022	Kalan.FrFr	222
"Solid"	2022	Burna Boy, Kehlani	Love, Damini
"Wouldn't Be Us"	2022	Mozzy, YG	Survivor's Guilt
"Worth a Heartbreak"	2024	Mustard, A Boogie wit da Hoodie	Faith of a Mustard Seed

== Production discography ==
List of songs as producer, showing year released, performing artists and album name
Title	Year	Artist(s)	Album(s)
"Do Yo Gudda (Remix)"	2014	Hitta J3, Kendrick Lamar, YG, Problem	—N/a
"By Now"	2018	Eric Bellinger	Eazy Call
"Right wit It"	2018	Kalan.FrFr.	TwoFr
"Bacc Home"	2019	Blxst, Bino Rideaux	Sixtape
"Wake It Up"	2019	Blxst, Bino Rideaux	Sixtape
"Selfish"	2019	Blxst, Bino Rideaux	Sixtape
"Right Now"	2019	Blxst, Bino Rideaux	Sixtape
"Time"	2019	Blxst, Bino Rideaux	Sixtape
"Savage"	2019	Blxst, Bino Rideaux	Sixtape
"Miss It"	2019	Bino Rideaux, Casey Veggies	Sorry 4 the Wait
"Beep"	2020	Bino Rideaux	Outside
"Nobody"	2020	Bino Rideaux	Outside
"Brand New"	2020	Bino Rideaux, Blxst	Outside
"Feelings"	2020	BlueBucksClan, Bino Rideaux	No Rules 2
"No Love Lost"	2020	Blxst	No Love Lost
"Overrated"	2020	Blxst	No Love Lost
"Wrong or Right"	2020	Blxst	No Love Lost
"Gang Slide"	2020	Blxst	No Love Lost
"Be Alone"	2020	Blxst	No Love Lost
"Just Say'n"	2020	Blxst	No Love Lost
"Searching"	2020	Blxst	No Love Lost
"Hurt"	2020	Blxst	No Love Lost
"Forever Humble"	2020	Blxst	No Love Lost
"Got It All"	2020	Blxst, Dom Kennedy	No Love Lost
"Chosen"	2020	Blxst, Ty Dolla Sign, Tyga	No Love Lost
"Wrong or Right (Remix)"	2020	Blxst, Bino Rideaux	No Love Lost
"Don't Forget"	2021	Blxst, Drakeo the Ruler	Just for Clarity
"Fck Boys"	2021	Blxst, Russ	Just for Clarity
"Movie"	2021	Blxst, Bino Rideaux	Sixtape 2
"Might Do Well"	2021	Blxst, Bino Rideaux	Sixtape 2
"Program"	2021	Blxst, Bino Rideaux	Sixtape 2
"Accountable"	2021	Blxst, Bino Rideaux	Sixtape 2
"Hate How Much"	2021	Blxst, Bino Rideaux	Sixtape 2
"What is It"	2021	Blxst, Bino Rideaux	Sixtape 2
"Time Will Only Tell"	2021	Blxst, Bino Rideaux	Sixtape 2
"Beginning to the Ending"	2021	Blxst, Bino Rideaux	Sixtape 2
"Chose Me"	2021	Blueface, Blxst	Fan or Opp
"Never Was Wrong"	2022	Blxst	Before You Go
"Still Omw"	2022	Blxst	Before You Go
"Be Forreal"	2022	Blxst	Before You Go
"Let It Be Known"	2022	Blxst	Before You Go
"Solid"	2022	Burna Boy, Blxst, Kehlani	Love, Damini
