= Patrick Labyorteaux =

American actor (born 1965)

- Born: Patrick Francis Labyorteaux; July 22, 1965 (age 61); Los Angeles, California, U.S.
- Occupation: Actor
- Years active: 1972–present
- Spouse: Tina Albanese (m. 1998)
- Children: 1
- Relatives: Matthew Labyorteaux (brother)

Patrick Francis Labyorteaux (born July 22, 1965) is an American actor. In many of his earlier credits, his last name is spelled as "Laborteaux". He is best known for his roles of Andrew "Andy" Garvey on the NBC series Little House on the Prairie as well as Bud Roberts on the CBS series JAG and NCIS.

== Early life ==
Labyorteaux was born on July 22, 1965, in Los Angeles, California, to unknown biological parents. He was adopted at the age of nine months by Ronald "Ron" Labyorteaux (1930–1992), a talent agent, and Frances Mae "Frankie" Labyorteaux (1927–2012), an actress who used the stage name Frances Marshall. Little is known of his personal life before he was adopted, though his adoptive mother commented that when they first met Labyorteaux, he was suffering from malnutrition and had been labeled "unadoptable" by social workers. His brother, Matthew Labyorteaux, was adopted by Ronald and Frances in 1967, when he was 10 months old, and his sister, Jane Labyorteaux, at an unknown date.

== Life and career ==
Labyorteaux, also credited as Patrick Laborteaux in his early career, starred on television and in film. His well-known TV roles are on the hit NBC series Little House on the Prairie as Andrew "Andy" Garvey from 1977 to 1981, and on the CBS hit series JAG as Lt. Cmdr. Bud Roberts from 1995 to 2005, a role he reprised in three episodes of JAG's spin-off, NCIS. Other TV shows on which he has made guest appearances include Starsky & Hutch; 21 Jump Street; Living Single; Yes, Dear; Lois & Clark: The New Adventures of Superman; The Love Boat; Ghost Whisperer; and iCarly.

He acted in films as well. He played Peter (Patrick's son), great nephew of Lucille Ball's character in the 1974 film Mame. One of his well-known roles is in the 1987 comedy film Summer School as football player Kevin Winchester alongside future JAG/NCIS costar Mark Harmon. He appeared in the 1988 cult film Heathers as Ram Sweeney. He voices cartoons such as Spider-Man: The Animated Series, Godzilla: The Series and others. In 2001 he co-wrote and starred in the feature film Hollywood Palms with his Summer School and Ski School co-star Dean Cameron.

== Personal life ==
Labyorteaux has been married to Tina Albanese, a TV producer, since 1998. They have one child, a son named Jeau Bennett Labyorteaux (b. 2001).

== Filmography ==
=== Film ===
Year	Title	Role	Notes
1974	Blazing Saddles	Henry	Uncredited
1974	Mame	Peter	
1974	Only With Married Men	Peter West	TV movie
1977	A Circle of Children	Patrick	TV movie
1977	Young Joe, the Forgotten Kennedy	Ted Kennedy	TV movie
1977	Opening Night	Child Actor	Uncredited
1978	The Comedy Company	Davey Byron	TV movie
1986	Prince of Bel Air	Justin	TV movie
1987	Summer School	Kevin Winchester	
1987	Terminal Entry	Bob	
1988	Heathers	Ram Sweeney	
1991	Ski School	Ed Young	
1991	Ghoulies III: Ghoulies Go to College	Mookey	Direct to video
1991	Adventures in Dinosaur City	Rex / Mr. Big	Voice
1992	3 Ninjas	Fester	
1994	National Lampoon's Last Resort	Young Hemlock	Direct to video
1995	A Father for Charlie	Postmaster	TV movie
1995	The Stranger Beside Me	Police Officer Lane	TV movie
2001	Hollywood Palms	Clark	
2002	Redemption of the Ghost	Cameron	
2008	Yes Man	Marv	
2009	Melancholy Baby	Zachariah Block	Short
2010	In My Sleep	Rob	
2011	Ice Age	Bill Hart	Direct to video
2018	The Last Sharknado: It's About Time	Julius Caesar	TV movie
2018	Rent an Elf	Dale	TV movie
2023	Arctic Armageddon	Secretary Carter	Direct to video
2024	Meth Gator	Mayor Jensen	Mockbuster of the movie Cocaine Bear

=== Television ===
Year	Title	Role	Notes
1973	This Is the Life	Eric Barrington	Episode: "Child of Rage, Child of Tears"
1976	Shazam!	Bill Sherwood	Episode: "Ripcord"
1976	Captains and the Kings	Young Rory Armagh	Miniseries
1977–1981	Little House on the Prairie	Andrew "Andy" Garvey	Recurring role
1977	Starsky & Hutch	Richie Yeager	Episodes: "The Plague" (Parts 1 & 2)
1979	The Love Boat	Bobby Trymon	Episode: "Ages of Man / Bo 'n Sam / Families"
1979	Trapper John, M.D.	Billy	Episode: "One for My Baby"
1981	The Love Boat	Todd Andrews	Episode: "The Lady from Laramie/Vicki Swings/Phantom Bride"
1989	21 Jump Street	Pvt. Jack Weaver	Episode: "A.W.O.L."
1990	Paradise	Jerome	Episodes: "The Gates of Paradise", "Shadow of a Doubt"
1995–1998	Spider-Man: The Animated Series	Flash Thompson	Voice
1995	Hope and Gloria	Howie	Episode: "Are We Having Fun Yet?"
1995	Lois & Clark: The New Adventures of Superman	Bob Fences	Episode: "Contact"
1995	New York Daze	Stairmaster Guy	Episode: "Rebound Guy"
1995–2005	JAG	Lt. Bud Roberts Jr.	Main role
1996	The Last Frontier	Andy	Recurring role
1996	Living Single	Officer Solis	Episode: "The Engagement: Part 2"
1999	Godzilla: The Series	Dr. Hoffman	Voice, episode: "Monster Wars"
2003	Yes, Dear	Lt. Bud Roberts Jr.	Episode: "Let's Get Jaggy with It"
2003, 2016–2018 & 2022	NCIS	Lt./Cap. Bud Roberts Jr.	Recurring role
2007	Without a Trace	William Broeder	Episode: "The Beginning"
2008	Wildfire	Derek Polk	Episode: "Flames"
2008	CSI: Crime Scene Investigation	Bob Lenz	Episode: "Say Uncle"
2009	Ghost Whisperer	Jeffrey Crockett	Episode: "Ghost Busted"
2009	The Storm	Carter	Miniseries
2009	Dexter	Cook (Sandwich Shop)	Episode: "Dirty Harry"
2009	iCarly	Wilson	Episode: "iFind Lewbert's Lost Love"
2016	American Crime Story	Mike Walker	Episode: "100% Not Guilty"
2016	Castle	Glen Hume	Episode: "Dead Again"
2016	Scandal	Doug Morton	Episode: "That's My Girl"
2017	Rebel	Dr. Adam Loyton	Episode: "Brother's Keeper"
2022	For All Mankind	Congressman Willie Baron	Episode: "Bring It Down"
2022	NCIS	Olev Kovlov	Episode: "Love Lost"
