= Katherine Brooks =

American film writer and director (born 1976)

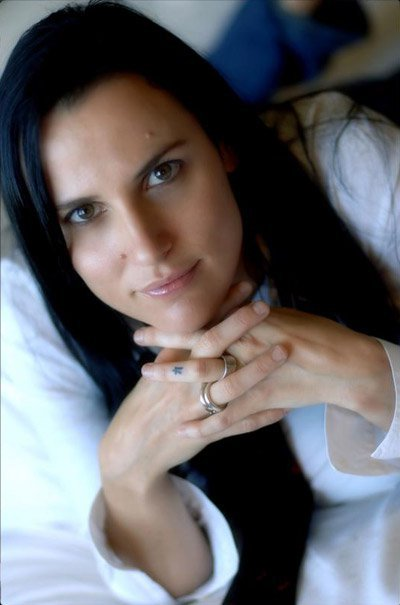
- Brooks in 2010
- Born: Sara Katherine Hill; March 15, 1976 (age 50); Covington, Louisiana, U.S.
- Occupations: Writer, film director
- Website: http://www.katherinebrooks.com

Katherine Brooks (born March 15, 1976) is an American film writer and director.

== Early life ==
At the age of 16, Brooks ran away from her small town home in Louisiana to pursue a career in television and film. After reaching Los Angeles, she slept in her car in the parking lot of a Hollywood motel.

== Career ==
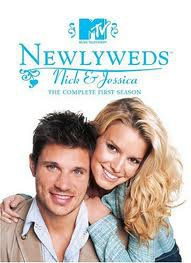
Nick Lachey and Jessica Simpson of The Newlyweds

Brooks has directed 21 television shows, as well as written and directed 10 films. Her film and television credits include three seasons of the Emmy Award-winning show The Osbournes, Newlyweds: Nick and Jessica, and MTV's The Real World. While associated with MTV, she helmed several of the network's reality series, including There and Back, Meet the Barkers and The Simple Life.

Brooks moved into directing feature films after making her short films Finding Kate and Dear Emily.

Brooks' first feature film, Loving Annabelle (2006) starred Erin Kelly, Diane Gaidry, and Kevin McCarthy. It debuted at the Cinequest Film Festival in 2006. The film won the Audience Award and Best Actress Award at Outfest. In addition, Loving Annabelle won Best Feature Film at the Melbourne Film Festival (2006), Barcelona Film Festival (2006), Atlanta Film Festival (2006), and the Jury Award at Paris Cinema Festival (2006).

Brooks wrote her second feature, the indie thriller Waking Madison(2011), set in New Orleans. It starred Sarah Roemer (Disturbia), Elisabeth Shue, Will Patton, Frances Conroy, and Taryn Manning.

Her documentary Face 2 Face appeared on Netflix in 2013. She served as a Field Producer on National Geographic Presents: Impact with Gal Gadot, produced by Gal Gadot.

Her most recent work is Lost in Time (2018), starring Jill Hennessey.

Brooks has published her first book The Magic of Microdosing: A Guide to Mental Health, Healing, and Hope.

== Personal life ==
Brooks is a spokesperson for PETA and a practicing Buddhist. Brooks lives in New Orleans, Louisiana. Brooks is a lesbian.

== Films ==
=== Finding Kate ===
In 2004, Erin Kelly and Brooks made an experimental short film called Finding Kate. The short film was part of a series called Virgin Memoirs, a compilation that narrated the "first-time" experiences of women.

A young Kelly plays 17-year-old Kate at a wedding reception. When she sees Victoria (Jessica Lancaster), she quickly drops her boyfriend's hand to go and talk to her cousin. The two flirt and end up in the pool together, their eyes dancing until they begin to kiss.

=== Dear Emily ===
Sara is going to visit her high school friend Emily. On her journey there, she recalls her last experience with her teenage crush, remembering a letter she wrote to Emily—a letter confessing her love for her. Following a painful flashback to Emily's mocking of Sara, after she reads the note, she decides to keep on driving to her destination. Dear Emily was funded after Brooks won a pitch contest for her feature film, Loving Annabelle, and was made on a low budget in six weeks.

=== Loving Annabelle ===
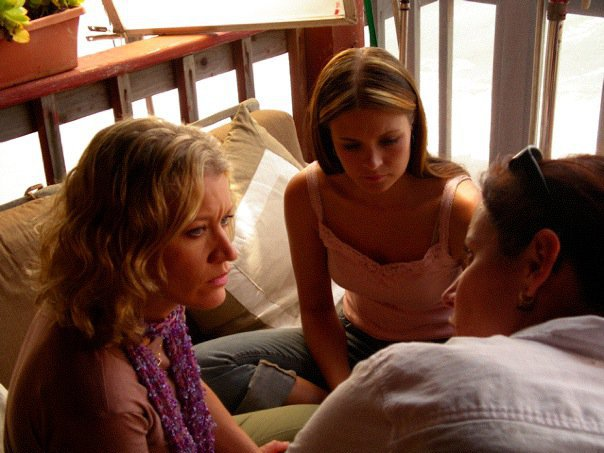
Left to right: Gaidry, Kelly, and Brooks on the set of Loving Annabelle, 2006

Loving Annabelle is the story of a Catholic boarding school teacher, Simone Bradley (Diane Gaidry), who has an affair with her female student, Annabelle (Erin Kelly).

The film was summed up by Variety magazine as a "Guilty Pleasure", and won numerous awards on the festival circuit, including the Outfest Award for Best Actress, and the Outfest Award for the Audience Choice.

=== Waking Madison ===
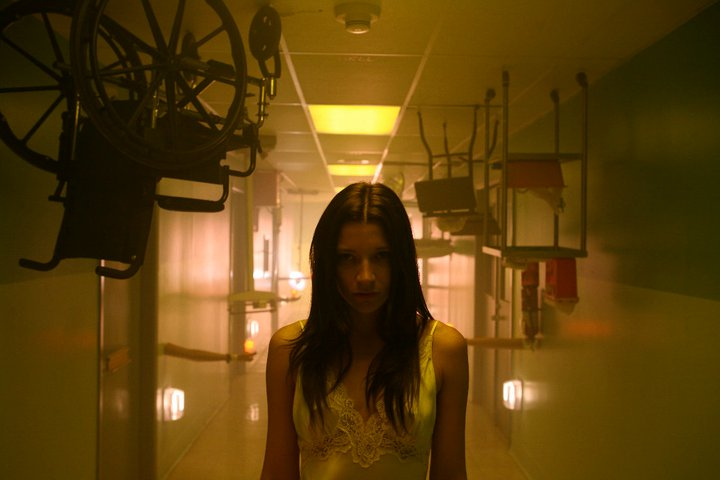
Sarah Roemer in Waking Madison, 2010

Waking Madison is the story of a young woman's battle with mental illness.

Madison Walker (Sarah Roemer) is suffering from dissociative identity disorder or multiple personality disorder. Living in New Orleans and working as a sex phone operator, Madison is doing everything she can to lead a normal life.

When a series of events leaves Madison suicidal and desperate, she locks herself away in her apartment for 30 days. Using a video camera to document herself like a visual journal, Madison clearly states in her first entry that if she does not have the answers to her questions and feels more at people with her life on the 30th day, she will kill herself.

With the help of Doctor Elizabeth Barnes (Elisabeth Shue), Madison begins to slowly piece her life together. Determined to find a cure for herself, Madison secludes herself in her apartment for 30 days and embarks on a journey to discover: what is real. The climactic twist at the end leaves audiences with the very same question. Brooks stated:

I'm intrigued by the challenge of telling a story from the perspective of a character suffering from multiple personality disorder. Visually, Madison will take on an innovative style of mixing narrative with documentary-realism.

As part of research for the topic, Brooks locked herself up for 30 days and underwent the same process as the character Madison. This helped Brooks to visually re-create her experiences from the trial, bringing the character and the story more to life. Waking Madison was shot on location in New Orleans in Winter 2007.

=== Face 2 Face ===
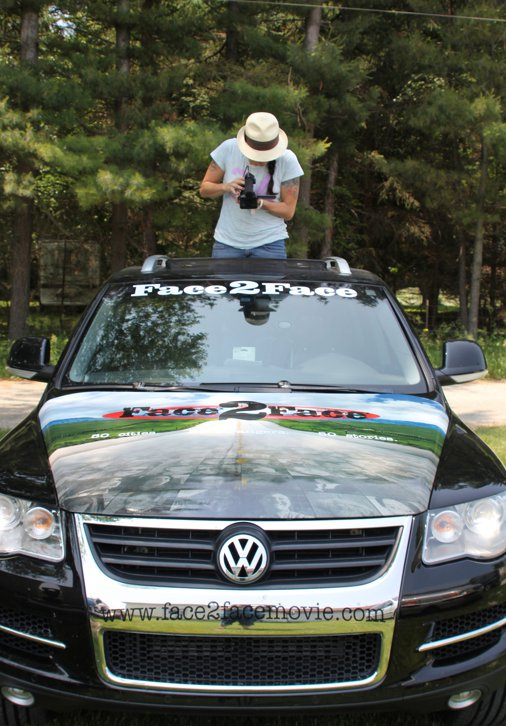
Katherine shooting Face 2 Face, 2011

Brooks completed a documentary with the director doing a three-month summer trip around the country, meeting 50 of her Facebook friends who said yes when she posed the question as her status, "Who would like to spend a day with me and I'll come visit you". The idea was born after the director had surgery, and despite having 4700 friends on Facebook, stated that she felt alone.

== Filmography ==
=== Features ===
- Lost In Time (2017)
- The Boys Club (pre-production)
- Face 2 Face (2012)
- Waking Madison (2009)
- Loving Annabelle (2006)
- Surrender (2003)

=== Short films ===
- Finding Kate (2004)
- Dear Emily (2001)
- Luna Butterflys (2000)
- Outtakes (1998)

=== Television ===
- There & Back: Ashley Parker Angel (TV series) (2006)
- My Own (TV series) (2006)
- Meet the Barkers (TV series) (2005)
- Love is in the Heir (TV series) (2004)
- He's a Lady (TV series) (2004)
- Wanna Come In? (TV series) (2004)
- The Simple Life 2: Road Trip (TV series) (2004)
- Newlyweds: Nick & Jessica (TV series) (2003)
- The Real World: San Diego (TV series) (2003)
- The Osbournes (TV series) (2002)
- The Complex (TV series) (2002)
- Sexcetera (TV series) (1998)

== See also ==
- List of female film and television directors
- List of lesbian filmmakers
- List of LGBT-related films directed by women
