= Filmmakers Alliance =

American nonprofit filmmakers organization

- Abbreviation: FA
- Formation: November 4, 1993; 32 years ago
- Founders: Jacques Thelemaque and Diane Gaidry
- Type: Nonprofit membership organization
- Location: Los Angeles, United States
- Website: filmmakersalliance.org

Filmmakers Alliance is an American nonprofit organization based in Los Angeles that supports filmmakers through peer to peer support and operating a filmmakers community.

It is best known for Visionfest, its yearly gala held every year at Directors Guild of America. The Vision Award, presented by Filmmakers Alliance at this event, has been given to such filmmakers as Terry Gilliam, Wim Wenders, and Alexander Payne.

== History ==
It was founded by Jacques Thelemaque and Diane Gaidry. Its over 300 members provide a support system through which members share time, energy, expertise, equipment and creative support for one another's film projects from concept through distribution.

Also presented at Visionfest was The Los Angeles Short Filmmaking Grant, which provided the winning short screenplay with 35mm film from Kodak, a camera package from Panavision, film processing and production support from Filmmakers Alliance. Past winners of this grant include Elyse Couvillion and Sean Hood.
