= EJay Day =

American singer-songwriter

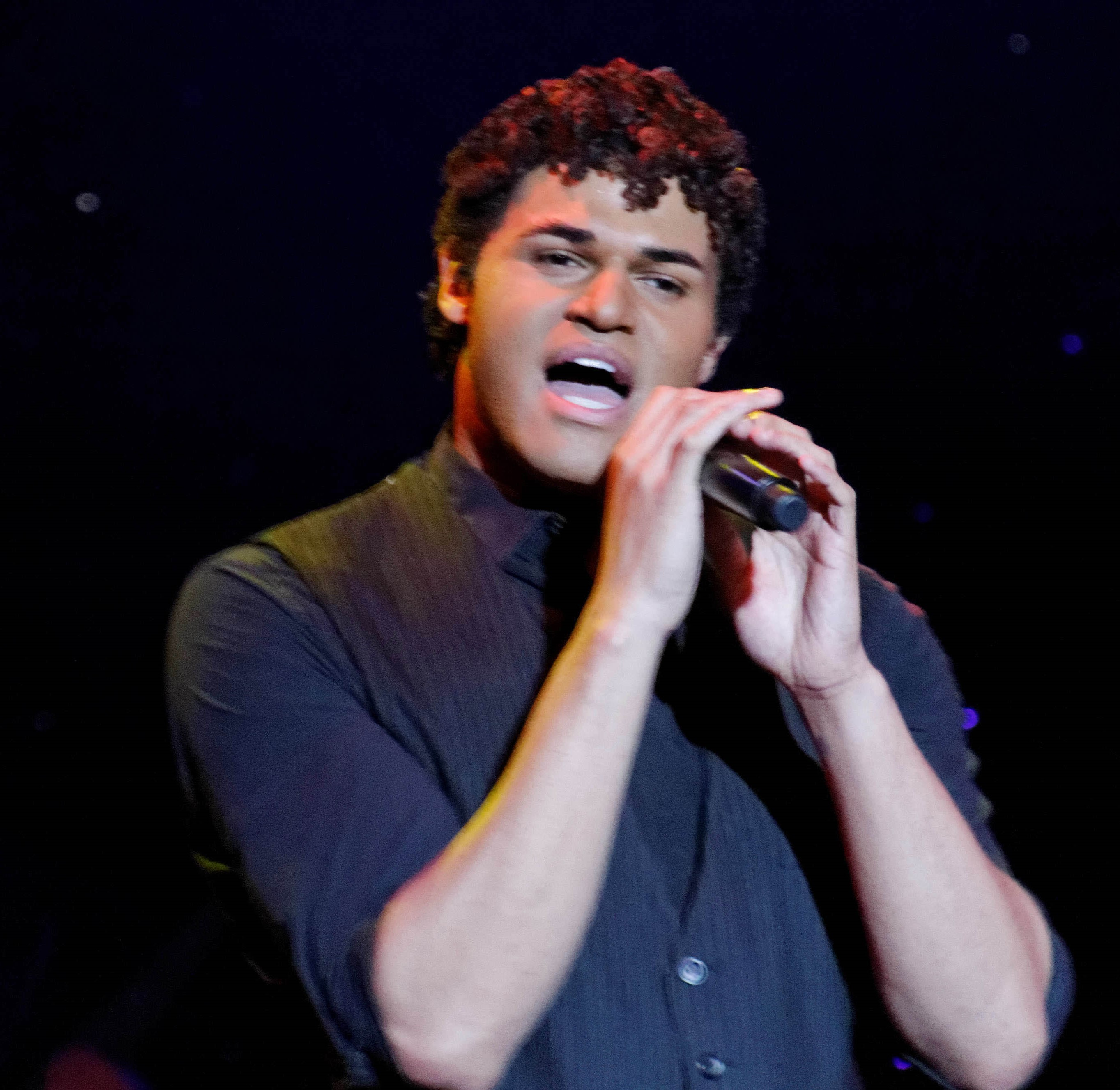
- Day singing on the MS Veendam cruise liner in 2012.

Background information
- Born: Earl Day Jr. September 13, 1981 (age 44)
- Origin: Lawrenceville, Georgia, United States
- Genres: R&B, pop
- Occupation: Singer-songwriter
- Years active: 1999–present

Earl "EJay" Day Jr. (born September 13, 1981) is an American singer and songwriter, who placed tenth during the first season of American Idol. Originally not chosen to advance into the voting rounds, Day was brought back to replace another contestant who had lied about his age. After being voted through the semi-finals into the top ten, Day became the first finalist in American Idol history to be eliminated from the competition. Prior to appearing on the Fox reality series, Day helped write the song "Pure Love" for Raven-Symoné's album Undeniable and placed in the top 20 on Popstars: USA.

Day went on to participate in the 2002 American Idols LIVE! tour and throughout the following year made several appearances at charity events. He toured again in 2003, as part of a promotional campaign called Coca-Cola's Behind the Scenes With American Idol – a tour in which various American Idol finalists performed in select shopping malls throughout the country. A recording of Day singing Edwin McCain's "I'll Be" is included on American Idol: Greatest Moments. This compilation album of all the first season finalists was released in 2002 and reached No. 4 on the Billboard 200 chart.

Although Day has never released a full album, he collaborated with his fellow American Idol first season finalist AJ Gil on a single in 2003. The song, "Calling All Angels", was written for and released through the charity organization Give Kids the World. Day and Gil first performed this song in Pasadena, California's New Year's Day Rose Parade. Later that year, Day released his own single, "Come Into My World", which attained limited airplay in Atlanta, Georgia. A full album of the same title was set to be released around 2006, but has never been made available.

Leading up to and then following his run on American Idol, Day has had a career performing on cruise ships – most notably ones operated by Royal Caribbean and Holland America. Day has also been cast in several stage productions over the years. His social media accounts contain several original songs that have never been commercially released.

== Early life and career beginnings ==
Earl Day Jr., known professionally as EJay Day, originally hails from Lawrenceville, Georgia. The youngest of four children, his parents, Earl Sr. and Gilda, were employed by Corporate Environments at the time of Day's American Idol appearance. Day took to singing in church at an early age. He would later credit this experience with helping to develop his vocal abilities, saying that it taught him how to "sing parts and harmonies". Before long, Day began performing in larger venues. He signed with a talent agency known as Hot Shot Kids/Teens in Atlanta, which also represented Tamyra Gray and Diana DeGarmo, two other local artists who would also go on to become American Idol finalists. At the age of twelve, Day sang the National Anthem before an Atlanta Braves game. According to the bio on Day's (now-defunct) official website, he had found a large audience by the age of fifteen, performing for several notable officials and celebrity figures, such as President George Bush, former U.S. Ambassador Andrew Young. Rev. Jesse Jackson, Hank Aaron, Andre Agassi, and Muhammad Ali. Day purportedly performed for Ali numerous times, "at book-signing events and other receptions [held in Ali's] honor."

In 1999, Day graduated from Central Gwinnett High School. The same year, he shared songwriting credit for the track "Pure Love" on Raven-Symoné's album Undeniable. At the time of his American Idol audition, Day was employed as a singer and dancer at Six Flags Over Georgia. He also found work singing on a cruise liner and was cast in multiple musicals. Prior to appearing on the Fox reality series, Day participated in the second season of Popstars: USA, placing in the Top 20.

== American Idol ==
Day auditioned for American Idol in Atlanta, Georgia, singing "Get Here" by Oleta Adams. He was twenty years old at the time. Although initially cut from the competition prior to the voting rounds, he advanced into the semi-finals, after another contestant, Delano Cagnolatti, was disqualified. Anyone over the age of twenty-four was not allowed to audition that season, (Note: American Idol's cut-off age would be raised to twenty-eight in later seasons.) and it was discovered that Cagnolatti, then twenty-nine, had lied in an attempt to escape the cut-off.

"I had 45 minutes to pack for the flight, I had to practice on the plane singing the song in my head and then the airline lost my luggage...Vocally, I was happy with my performance, but I thought my face looked frozen."

— EJay Day, commenting on his American Idol semi-final performance of "I'll Be"

Placed into Group 3 for the Top 30 semi-finals, Day performed "I'll Be", by Edwin McCain. Although he had less time to prepare than the other contestants, he received positive remarks from the judges and was voted through to the top ten. For the first round of the finals, each contestant was instructed to sing a Motown song. Day selected "My Girl", by The Temptations. Although he was once again praised by all three judges (and even called best of the night up to that point by Randy Jackson), (Note: Day performed fourth that night, following Ryan Starr, R.J. Helton, and Nikki McKibbin.) Day received the lowest number of votes that week and became the first finalist ever eliminated from American Idol. (Note: Two finalists were voted off from American Idol that week. Day was the first to be eliminated, followed by Jim Verraros.)

Day's performances with American Idol have caused a divergence of opinions among music critics. Following Day's elimination from the competition, Jessica Shaw of Entertainment Weekly concurred with the contestant's low placement, criticizing his fashion – "EJay could have been voted off simply for wearing that 'Please, sir, I want some more' Oliver Twist cap" – and his song choice that week – "Of all the Motown songs, did he have to pick one that’s been covered to death?" Day's recorded rendition of "I'll Be", on the American Idol: Greatest Moments album, earned a better reaction however, prompting another writer with the publication, Jon Caramanica, to declare that Day "got robbed". Dave Wedge of The Boston Herald also singled out "I'll Be" as a highlight on the album, writing that Day "show[s] personality along with some polish". Wedge considered Day's track superior to those included on the album of that season's runner-up contestant, Justin Guarini. In a review for The Herald News, Chuck Campbell was largely critical of the album and wrote that Day "bumbles along" on the track. He nonetheless considered Day's vocals to be emotionally well-conveyed.

"No one has sung better than that today; no one. You did great, brilliant...what else can I say? You just sung your heart out."

— Simon Cowell praising Day's American Idol semi-final performance of "I'll Be".

Ranking the sixteen most notable Georgians to ever appear on American Idol, Rodney Ho of the Atlanta Journal-Constitution placed Day in the twelfth spot. (Note: The list was not based purely on singing abilities. Host Ryan Seacrest was given the top spot, and Larry Platt – who auditioned, but never became an official contestant – was ranked ninth.) He wrote that Day's live rendition of "I'll Be", performed during the semi-finals, had "some tonal issues", but was mostly in key. In a 2013 retrospective feature by PopCrush, Cristin Maher wrote that Day displayed "sweet" and "smooth" vocals while on the series. Boston Herald writer Amy Amatangelo gained the impression that Day should have gone on further in the competition, after seeing his group medley performance in the first-season finale. A year after Day's run on American Idol, Simon Cowell reflected, "[EJay Day] could outsing Justin Guarini any day of the week, but he had just an average feel about him."

Day's involvement with the 2002 American Idols LIVE! tour also elicited varied reactions. Ho concluded that Day gave a better performance on this tour than some of the higher ranked contestants, calling Day's voice "the best of guys'". Day's performance in this setting was considered "barely audible" by Amatangelo, but she nonetheless complimented it for being "energetic". Writing for the St. Louis Post-Dispatch and the Chicago Sun-Times respectively, Kevin C. Johnson and Jim Derogatis were considerably less positive in their reviews. Johnson criticized the "harshly cut wig and thick makeup" that Day wore on the tour, while describing Day's performance in the set as "style over substance". Derogatis called Day's performance "completely forgettable". Offering up his own ranking of the ten finalists, Derogatis readjusted several positions, but still placed Day in last.

=== Performances ===
Episode	Theme	Song choice	Original artist	Order	Result
Audition	Contestant's Choice	"Get Here"	Oleta Adams	N/A	Advanced
Hollywood	Contestant's Choice	Get Here	Oleta Adams	N/A	Eliminated^{1}
Top 30	Contestant's Choice	"I'll Be"	Edwin McCain	7	Advanced
Top 10	Motown	"My Girl"	The Temptations	4	Eliminated

- ^Note 1 Although Day was cut from the competition during Hollywood Week, he was brought back to compete in the Top 30 semi-finals as a replacement for disqualified contestant Delano Cagnolatti.

== Post-Idol ==
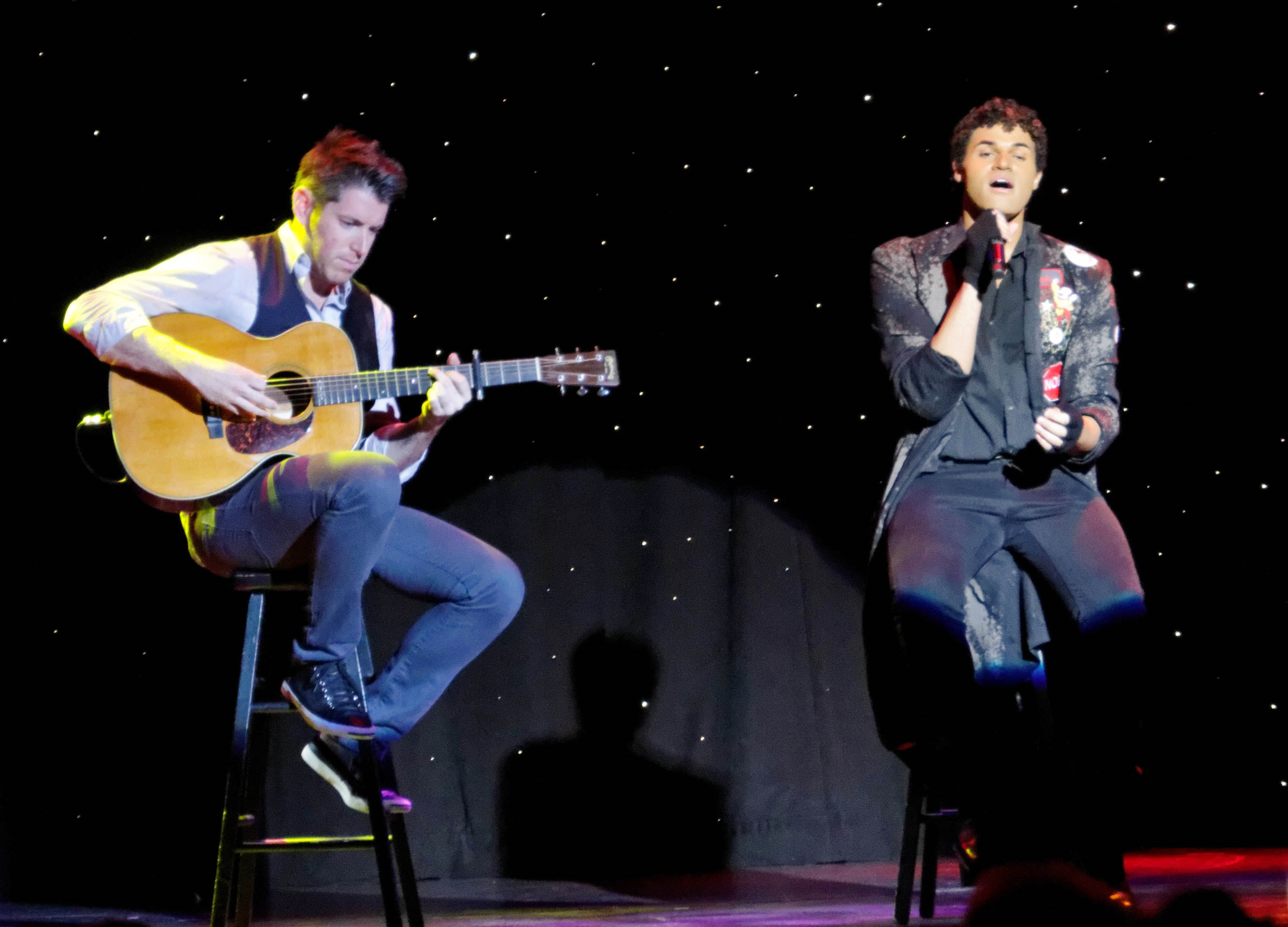
Day performing on the cruise ship MS Veendam in 2012 (with an unidentified guitar player on his left)

Less than a month after American Idol's first season finale, Day reunited with the top thirty contestants to perform in the two-hour American Idol in Las Vegas TV special. Day then participated through October and November in the 2002 American Idols LIVE! tour, along with his fellow top ten finalists. Each of this tour's thirty shows was opened by Day singing Janet Jackson's "Black Cat". To usher in 2003, Day performed in Pasadena, California's New Year's Day Rose Parade. Paired with eighth place finalist AJ Gil on a float for Give Kids the World, the two sang "Calling All Angels", a song which had been specifically written for the charity organization. The band OTown also participated in this float. Day and Gil would subsequently perform "Calling All Angels" at an Orlando, Florida fundraising gala in June and release this duet as a single through Give Kids the World. Later that year, Day participated in further fundraising events, such as the Hollywood Knights Season Wrap Party in Los Angeles (Note: Hollywood Knights raises money for high schools through basketball games played between celebrity figures and school faculties. "Up-and-coming" musical artists are featured during the half-time shows, and additional celebrity figures are invited to attend the season wrap party in June. Day was merely invited as a guest.) and NSYNC's Challenge for the Children event in Miami. Throughout the Spring, Day participated in Coca-Cola's Behind the Scenes With American Idol promotional tour, in which he and a selection of other finalists from the first two seasons of the series performed in shopping malls owned by the Simon Property Group. Around this time, Day also performed the National Anthem for a variety of professional Georgia sports teams, such as the Atlanta Hawks and the Atlanta Thrashers. In November, Day performed along with Edwin McCain and American Idol second season finalist Vanessa Olivarez in a tree lighting ceremony at the World of Coca-Cola.

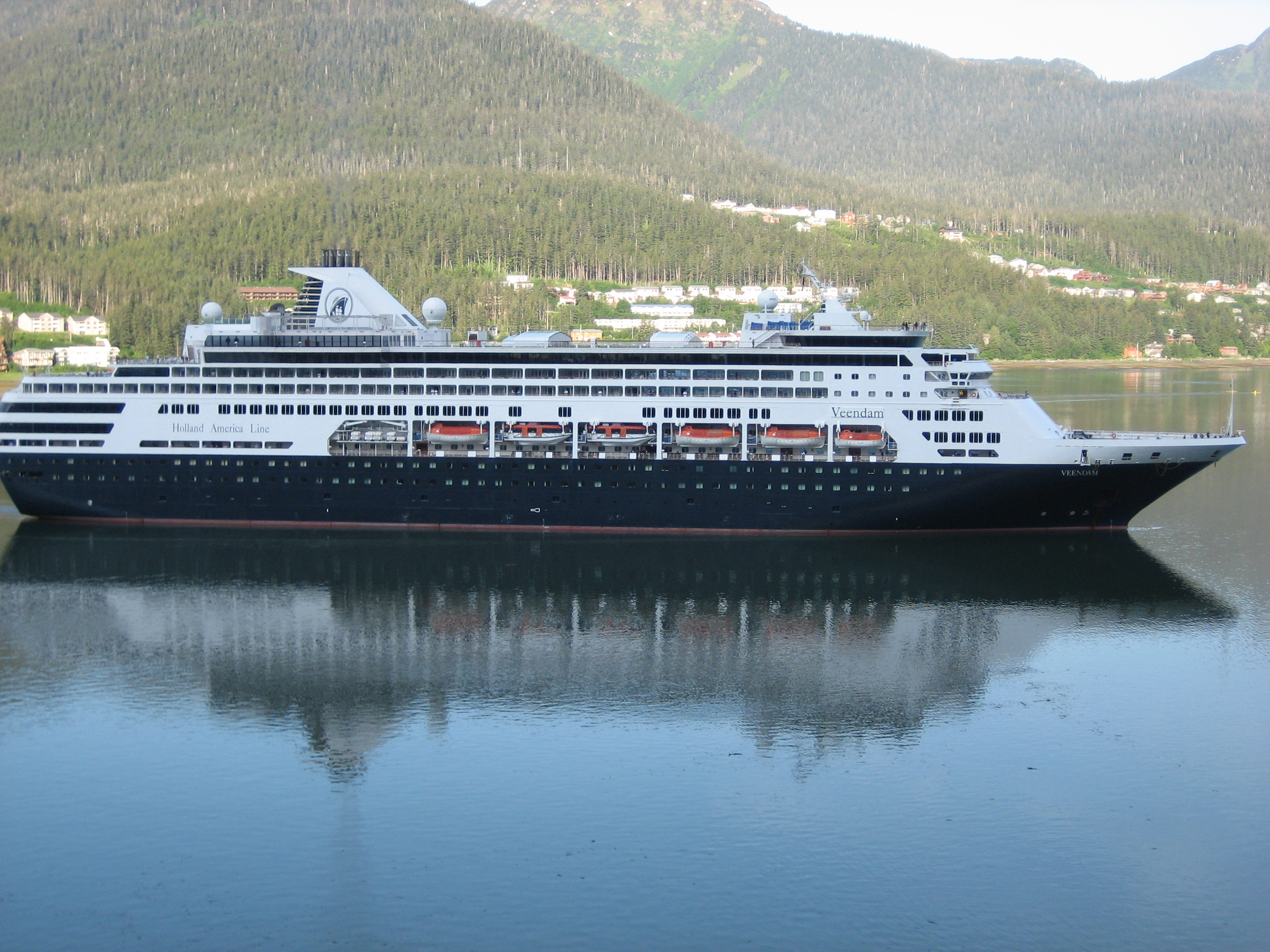
The MS Veendam, a cruise ship on which Day has often performed

Shortly after appearing on American Idol, Day returned to performing on cruise ships. Between 2005 and 2008, it was reported that he had been performing on two different ships operated by Royal Caribbean – Voyager of the Seas and Explorer of the Seas. By 2011, Day had established a musical act performing on Holland America's MS Veendam. Day has also been cast in several low-profile theatrical productions. It has been suggested by PopCrush, that Day may have continued performing for Muhammad Ali, extending his purported pre-Idol history with the iconic boxer.

The American Idol: Greatest Moments album, released October 1, 2002, features a recorded version of Day singing Edwin McCain's "I'll Be". The album reached No. 4 on the Billboard 200 chart. Although Day has never released a debut album of his own, he remarked during his American Idol run that he would likely title such an album Fire or Eye Candy. Following his elimination from the series, Day elaborated to Billboard that his dream would be to collaborate with The Neptunes on music similar to that of Britney Spears. Five months later, People magazine reported that Day was recording "demo tapes", and the following April, Day told Orlando Weekly that he had completed a song called "Come Into My World". In July 2003, "Come Into My World" was released as a single. According to Day's official website, the song found airplay on two radio stations in Atlanta. Currently, "Come Into My World" can be heard on Day's StarNow account, along with another original song, "My Lovin's Too Good Too Wait". Day's MySpace page included two additional tracks, "Just Let Go" and "One Good Beat", which can no longer be heard due to MySpace accidentally deleting millions of songs.

In September 2006, it was reported by Gwinnett Daily Post that Day had recorded a full album. Evoking Day's single from three years earlier, this album would have been titled Come into My World. Although unreleased, the album was said to contain original songs, mixing R&B with pop. The publication was told by Day that "many of the songs were inspired by his experiences performing on cruise ships." Day's official website noted that the album's songs were written by Day himself, Charlie Morgan, and Georgi Ivanov.

In 2008, USA Today reported that Day was "beginning to record a dance album with producers the Perry Twins", and in 2012, the LGBT publication Baltimore OUTloud reported that the Perry Twins were writing and producing new music for Day. Two years later, on September 4, 2014, Day uploaded a song titled "Need You in My Life" to his YouTube channel. In the description, Day called this the first song on which he understood the "meaning [of] songwriting" and noted that it was inspired by a relationship in which he and the other person had to part ways, in spite of their strong feelings for one another. "Time was not on our side. It's usually like that for me...[but maybe], just maybe we would meet again", Day wrote about the song.

== Discography ==
=== Singles ===
Year	Single	Album
2003	"Calling All Angels" (with AJ Gil)	Non-album single
2003	"Come Into My World"	Non-album single
N/A	"My Lovings Too Good Too Wait"	Non-album single
N/A	"Just Let Go"	Non-album single
N/A	"One Good Beat"	Non-album single
2014	"Need You in My Life"	Non-album single

=== Compilation appearances ===
Year	Title	Peak chart positions	Details
Year	Title	US	Details
2002	American Idol: Greatest Moments	4	Credited on the following tracks: "I'll Be" (Solo Performance); "California Dreamin'" (Group Performance)
