= Jim Verraros =

American singer, songwriter, and actor (born 1983)

- Born: James Conrad Verraros; February 8, 1983 (age 43); Mount Prospect, Illinois, U.S.
- Origin: Crystal Lake, Illinois
- Genres: Pop rock; dance
- Occupations: Singer-songwriter; actor
- Years active: 2002–present
- Label: Koch Records

James Conrad Verraros (born February 8, 1983) is an American singer, songwriter, and actor, who placed ninth on the first season of American Idol. Raised by deaf parents, he is fluent in American Sign Language and gained notoriety on American Idol for signing the lyrics to his audition song. After competing on the series, he released three pop rock, dance albums with music producer and songwriter Gabe Lopez. Verraros was also featured on the 2002 compilation album American Idol: Greatest Moments, covering "Easy" by the Commodores – this album reached number four on the Billboard 200 chart.

While participating in the 2002 American Idols LIVE! tour, Verraros came out as gay. He was the first American Idol finalist to come out, and he remained the series' only publicly gay finalist for over three years. Several organizations subsequently honored Verraros as an influential figure within the gay community (such as Out magazine, which named him to its "Most Intriguing People" list twice, first in 2002 and again in 2006). Throughout his music career, Verraros performed at numerous pride events. He also toured at gay clubs.

Verraros released his official debut album, Rollercoaster, through independent label Koch Records in 2005. It was accompanied by two singles and received generally positive reviews. Some of the songs from Rollercoaster had previously been featured on a demo album, Unsaid and Understood, which Verraros had self-released through mp3.com around 2003. The lead single from Rollercoaster, "You Turn It On", peaked at number twenty-one on the Billboard Dance Club Play Chart.

In addition to music, Verraros pursued an acting career. He had a starring role in the first two installments of the gay comedy film franchise Eating Out, and he had a cameo in Another Gay Movie. He also stayed involved with American Idol-related projects for several years. In 2003, he joined with various finalists from the first two seasons of the series for a promotional tour of select shopping malls throughout the United States, and later, he co-hosted a video recap series of American Idol's seventh season for AfterElton.com.

In 2007, Verraros released a non-album single about his then-to-be husband, Bill Brennan; the song, "You Make It Better", was featured in the second Eating Out film. Verraros and Brennan married in 2009. The same year as his wedding, Verraros self-released three new singles, although the accompanying second album, Do Not Disturb, was not released until 2011. Following Do Not Disturb, Verraros announced his intention to retire from music. He subsequently served as executive vice president of Brennan's organization, Bridal Expo Chicago and Bridal Expo Milwaukee. Verraros and Brennan have since separated.

== Early life ==
Verraros was born on February 8, 1983, in Mount Prospect, Illinois. He grew up in nearby Crystal Lake. His father, Nicholas, (Note: Verraros has Greek heritage on his father's side.) and mother, Debbie, both lost their hearing after contracting German measles as infants. Verraros was raised to be fluent in American Sign Language. The responsibility of interpreting for his parents as a child led him to relate with people older than himself, more than he did with others his own age. Reflecting on his childhood, Verraros once said, "I had to do things like hold phone conversations and discuss things with doctors and even real estate agents. I had to become well-versed not only with sign language but with people skills as well...I didn't have time for bullshit."

My facial expressions are sort of huge and over the top, and I think that does come from having to sign. When you use sign language to communicate it's mostly from the shoulders up – and mostly in your face.

— Verraros on how growing up with deaf parents influenced his performing style.

Around the age of twelve or thirteen, Verraros realized that he is gay. Although he did not come out publicly until after adolescence, his sexual orientation was apparent to his classmates, who bullied him during middle school. In response, Verraros developed a more masculine appearance. In a 2003 interview, he said of the time, "I changed my image. I wore a lot of baggy jeans, I gained weight, and it was fine for a while." He also sought help from the school psychologist during those years. High school marked a more significant improvement for him – he became active in theater and went on to attend Monmouth College on a theater scholarship.

Upon later transferring to Columbia College, Verraros struggled to find acting opportunities. Insecure about the weight that he had put on, he began doing intensive workouts and became a vegetarian. Over the course of two and a half months, he lost around eighty pounds. Some people thought that he had developed an eating disorder, and Verraros later acknowledged that he most likely did.

Verraros was open about his sexual orientation with classmates at both colleges. Looking back in 2004, he said that people who had been mean to him in high school were "rooting" for him at Monmouth and that he came out to his mother and sister during this time. In another interview, he called the environment at Columbia "beyond gay-friendly".

== American Idol ==
During his time at Columbia College, Verraros followed a friend's suggestion to try out for American Idol and attended the auditions in Chicago – even though his primary interest was acting. Verraros later said that he had only tried out "for fun" and without any expectations. In 2006, he reminisced, "I wasn't really looking for a record deal. I was looking for the experience, and everything just kind of... happened." The auditions were held only a few blocks away from his college dorm.

Attempting to stand out, Verraros chose to sing "When I Fall in Love" by Nat King Cole at his audition, rather than a pop song. He was nineteen at the time. While singing, he also signed the lyrics to his song. American Idol heavily focused on his parents' disabilities, and several publications speculated that Verraros may have been helped in the competition by sympathy votes.

Jim Verraros...he's a nice kid...this was the first show that they were recording, and I kinda heard 'em, like, 'yeah, we're gonna nail Jim'. I'm like, 'what are you gonna nail Jim for? [What] do you mean, you're gonna nail Jim?'

So [Verraros] sings...he comes over, he's got tears in his eyes...I'm like, 'Hey, Paula Abdul said she liked you, what else matters?'...[Nigel Lythgoe] rips me off stage, takes me around back, and starts screaming at me...and I said, '[Wait] a minute, just so I understand you, if these kids come back here feeling like shit, I'm supposed to make sure they continue to feel like shit?'

— Brian Dunkleman recounting his American Idol semi-finals experience.

Despite receiving positive remarks from the judges at his audition, Verraros began receiving largely negative feedback by the Top 30 semi-finals. Placed into Group 1 for that round he chose to reprise "When I Fall in Love". Simon Cowell and Paula Abdul both called this the best performance that Verraros had given on the series up to that point, but Cowell also called Verraros "ordinary" in comparison to that night's preceding performer, Tamyra Gray, and declared, "I think if you win this competition, we would have failed." Jessica Shaw of Entertainment Weekly called this the harshest critique that Cowell had given to any contestant on the series up to that point. First season co-host Brian Dunkleman recalled in a 2014 podcast overhearing the judges say that they were going to "nail Jim" on the night of the semi-finals. After the performance, Dunkleman offered Verraros reassurance, but during a commercial break, the series' executive producer, Nigel Lythgoe, purportedly took Dunkleman backstage and raged against him for not further demoralizing Verraros. Dunkleman recounted this as a partial explanation for why he quit the series after its first season.

Phil Rosenthal of the Chicago Sun-Times speculated that the severity of Cowell's comments during the semi-finals may have increased audience support for Verraros, who was voted through to the top ten. Originally, Verraros was going to be cut anyway. In his 2011 tell-all book, American Idol: The Untold Story, Richard Rushfield revealed that a "judge's cut" was going to be introduced as a twist to the semi-finals. After the Group 1 results episode went off air, Cowell went to the three contestants who had been voted through to the finals (Note: The three contestants voted through to the finals from Group 1 were Verraros, Gray, and Ryan Starr.) and told Verraros that the judges were overruling his advancement to the next round. Rushfield wrote that "A stunned Verraros and his fellow contestants burst into tears" upon hearing the announcement. Before the twist could be aired, Lythgoe reversed the decision, arguing that the audience's preference should be respected. In 2020, Lythgoe and Verraros spoke together on a podcast and shared their own memories of the "judge's cut", clarifying that it actually occurred on the performance night rather than the results night.

His place in the top ten secure, Verraros planned to sing "Get Ready" by The Temptations for the first round of finals. The week's theme was Motown. Verraros won a coin toss against Kelly Clarkson, who also wanted to sing "Get Ready", but he switched course upon considering how much of the song is in falsetto. With a limited selection of Motown songs available for him to choose from, Verraros settled on "Easy" by The Commodores, even though he was unfamiliar with it. The judges were critical of the performance. Two contestants were voted off that week, and Verraros was the second eliminated, following EJay Day.

=== Performances ===
Episode	Theme	Song choice	Original artist	Order	Result
Audition	Auditioner's Choice	"When I Fall in Love"	Nat King Cole	N/A	Advanced
Hollywood	Contestant's Choice	"Ain't No Mountain High Enough"	Marvin Gaye and Tammi Terrell	N/A	Advanced
Top 30	Contestant's Choice	"When I Fall in Love"	Nat King Cole	2	Advanced
Top 10	Motown	"Easy"	The Commodores	7	Eliminated

=== Public response ===
When Verraros advanced into the top ten for American Idol's first season, Shaw (of Entertainment Weekly) wrote of the contestant, "I can't decide whether I love him or loathe him." She likened Verraros to a forgettable boy-band member, but also wrote that she had appreciated Verraros' decision to use sign language during his audition. After Verraros was voted off the series, Shaw wrote of him, "I genuinely felt bad for the guy...Of course, I could have told you all that he wasn't advancing on to the next round. You can't follow up stellar singers like Tamyra and Justin [Guarini] with a tepid rendition of 'Easy.'" Jim Derogatis of the Chicago Sun-Times was more favorable. After watching all of the top ten finalists perform on their nationwide tour, he suggested that Verraros should have placed seventh and commended him for "doing as well as anyone could" with poor singing-material (referring to "Easy"). Another positive review of Verraros came from Rick Shefchik of the Saint Paul Pioneer Press, who wrote that Verraros sang a "tender version" of "When I Fall in Love" during the competition. Most critics, however, voiced negative opinions. Amy Amatangelo of the Boston Herald wrote that Verraros "lacked stage presence" and Eric Deggans of St. Petersburg Times called Verraros "obviously overmatched" among the other first season finalists. In his review of American Idol: Greatest Moments, Chuck Campbell of The Herald News was critical of Verraros' track on the album, writing "Verraros takes it too easy on his slack interpretation of Lionel Richie's Easy."

== Post-Idol life and career ==
=== 2002–2003: American Idol tour and related projects ===
About a month after being voted out of the top ten on American Idol's first season, Verraros joined thirteen other former contestants from the series to perform at various events in Northwest Indiana. (Note: This group was initiated by Mark Scott, an American Idol semi-finalist from the area, for the main purpose of performing at "Let's Go to the Hoop", a 3-on-3 children's basketball tournament in Gary, Indiana.) He participated in a group medley during American Idol's first season finale and a few weeks later, he reunited with all of the series' top thirty contestants for the American Idol in Las Vegas TV special. Verraros then participated through October and November in the American Idols LIVE! Tour 2002, along with his fellow top ten finalists. For each stop of the tour, he reprised his performance of "Easy" from the series.

Oh, well, you know we were really shocked about that...We had no idea he was gay. Jim Verraros actually came up to me at a show and said, 'Simon, I've got something to tell you.' I said, 'What?' He said, 'I'm gay.' I said, 'Yeah?' He went, 'Well, I've come out.' I said, 'Jim, you came out the second you appeared on this bloody show.'

— Simon Cowell in March 2003.

Prior to competing on American Idol, Verraros had been open about his sexual orientation through an online journal. The Advocate, an American LGBT-interest magazine, discovered this journal while Verraros was on the series and contacted Fox with an interview request for the contestant. One day later, the journal was deleted. Verraros later explained to The Advocate that his journal had been removed because Fox did not want it to give him an unfair advantage in the competition. (Note: Years later, Verraros remarked, "Looking back, [the network's policy] could be interpreted a bunch of different ways. One possibility is that they didn't want me to [come out]".) Verraros was open about his sexuality with the other American Idol finalists, whom he described as being very supportive.

Verraros came out publicly during the American Idol tour. He also came out to his father at this time. In November 2002, Verraros was named as one of "2002's Most Intriguing People" by Out, another LGBT-interest magazine. Around that time, Verraros said, "I just thought it was time to come out. I really hate the segregation and only being able to hold hands in gay bars. We have to start breaking down the barriers. I want to be a gay advocate and let teens know that being gay is just a small part of who you are. And if people don't like it, it's their problem, not yours." Verraros gave an extensive interview to The Advocate in January 2003, which was described as his official "coming out", and in May, he participated in Boston's Youth Pride march.

The American Idol: Greatest Moments album, released October 1, 2002, features a recorded version of Verraros singing "Easy". The album reached No. 4 on the Billboard 200 chart. Asked during his run on American Idol what he might call his debut album, Verraros suggested "So You Say". Verraros moved to Los Angeles after the American Idol tour and was turned down by several agencies. While in LA, he lived for two years with Natalie Burge and Christopher Aaron, both of whom were in the Top 30 with him on American Idol's first season. (Note: Burge had a small role in Eating Out and performed as a dancer in at least one of Verraros' shows.) Throughout the Spring of 2003, Verraros participated in Coca-Cola's Behind the Scenes With American Idol promotional tour, in which he and a selection of other finalists from the first two seasons of the series performed across the country in shopping malls owned by the Simon Property Group.

=== 2003–2005: Unsaid and Understood, Eating Out, and Rollercoaster ===
Los Angeles-based singer-songwriter and music producer Gabe Lopez reached out to Verraros, after hearing American Idol: Greatest Moments. The two began a collaboration based out of Lopez's home studio. Unsigned to a record label, Verraros self-released his debut album, Unsaid and Understood, in 2003. While recording the album, he worked at a tanning salon and at a phone bank. Unsaid and Understood was included on a list of six indie albums by gay and lesbian artists recommended by Adam B. Vary of The Advocate. Vary wrote that Verraros "sings with true passion and bracing maturity" on the album and singled out the track "So Deep", for being "so dirty even Xtina would blush." Another track on the album, "I Want You", was included on Bi the People, a 2003 compilation album of "bisexual artists and friends", which was released to raise money for the Bisexual Foundation. Multiple tracks from Unsaid and Understood topped the Rock and Pop charts on mp3.com, and the album won the 2004 Out Music Award for Outstanding New Recording – Debut Male. A tour of gay clubs was undertaken to promote the album.

Around the same time that Verraros was recording Unsaid and Understood, Q. Allan Brocka, an American Idol fan, cast Verraros as Kyle in his 2004 gay-themed comedy Eating Out. The film was produced on a budget of less than $1 million by Ariztical Entertainment. Filming lasted ten days. Although intended as a straight-to-DVD release, it secured limited theatrical distribution in 2005, after performing well in film festivals. Two songs from Unsaid and Understood, "I Want You" and "Welcome to Hollywood", are included in Eating Out, as is a third song performed by Verraros, called "Visions of You". Writing again for The Advocate, Vary (along with Dennis Hensley) placed Eating Out among a group of films released in the mid-2000s that he and Hensley felt constituted a "New New Queer Cinema", after the initial "New Queer Cinema" movement faded in the 1990s. Vary also argued that, as a college sex comedy, Eating Out is notable for being an early example of a gay genre film. Eating Out received mostly negative reviews, although Verraros was praised for his performance by Dana Stevens in a review for The New York Times, who wrote that Verraros "has a scrappy energy that sets him apart from the bland and vulgar proceedings" of the film.

==== Rollercoaster ====
According to ChicagoPride.com, Verraros pitched Unsaid and Understood to "every major label in the U.S. two or three times" without success. Verraros then pursued a record deal in the United Kingdom, hoping that British labels would be more willing to work with an openly gay artist, although nothing materialized from this. New York-based indie label Koch Records began communicating with Verraros over the summer of 2004 about the possibility of featuring him on a compilation album of songs by American Idol finalists. Verraros sent Koch Records a demo tape and was signed to the label within a week. Unsaid and Understood was then revamped and released through Koch Records as Rollercoaster on April 26, 2005. (Note: An article for ChicagoPride.com suggested that the album was initially scheduled for a March release.) This was marketed as Verraros' official debut. The album recycles several songs from Unsaid and Understood, in addition to featuring new material.

'Idol' sort of cranks out these performers and then they become sort of forgettable, so I knew I had to find a way to stand out. I decided to do the whole rock star thing with makeup and mascara and sexed up my image a bit. I needed to grow up and change – and change is good.

— Jim Verraros on his image change after American Idol.

Several publications noted that Verraros went through a significant image change between his time on American Idol and the release of Rollercoaster. Verraros explained that he had "come into [himself]" during that time, having improved his figure and become more involved within the LGBT community. The Advocate wrote that on American Idol, Verraros had been "a slightly geeky kid with a stiff stance...[and] a preppy look [that] included dark- rimmed glasses, spiky hair and a stone-washed jeans jacket" – in contrast, The Advocate wrote, Verraros possessed "bad-boy good looks" and "long rock-star hair" when Rollercoaster was released. The Houston Chronicle added that the "shaggy dark cut, eye makeup and slick threads" that Verraros had adopted at the time gave him sex appeal. Verraros himself assessed his look on American Idol as having been "[very] Midwestern" – he said that he was wanting to distance himself from associations with the series and that he was excited "to see how people would react to such a crazy change".

A release party for Rollercoaster was held on April 27, 2005, at the Roxy Theatre in Hollywood. The date was chosen to follow Eating Out's Spring premiere in US theaters.

People assume that once you make it to the top ten, [you're] given these amazing opportunities…But we were the guinea pigs. Then it [American Idol] blew up and became this huge phenomenon. Now, as a solo artist, I would kill for that kind of exposure again.

— Jim Verraros in November 2005.

"You Turn It On" was released as Rollercoaster's first single. The song debuted at number forty-eight on the Billboard Dance Club Play Chart, where it spent eleven weeks, peaking in early June at number twenty-one.

"You're Getting Crazy (Estas Enloqueciendo)" was released in October as the album's second single. Billboard wrote that it "treads in similar territory [as "You Turn It On"] stirring the beats into a simmering frenzy." The song received multiple remixes by Mike Cruz and L.E.X, which Edgemedianetwork.com called "as slick, upbeat and professional as anything else currently climbing the charts." Billboard suggested that the song could become a hit, if Verraros released an accompanying music video, although no music videos were ever released for any of the songs on Rollercoaster.

Shortly after releasing Rollercoaster, Verraros moved back to Crystal Lake, where he lived with his family for a time. Over the summer of 2005, he performed at the wrap party for American Idol's fourth season, served as a judge during the finals of "Windy City Gay Idol" (held by the Windy City Times at the Circuit Nightclub in Chicago), attended a pride ceremony held by the New York City Council, (Note: The ceremony was held in honor of Laurel Holloman, Mathilde Krim, Christopher Sieber, Joyce Hunter (a founding member of the Hetrick-Martin Institute and the Harvey Milk School), Luis Freddy Molano (who founded the Community Healthcare Network's Bronx Health Center Transgender Program), and Miriam Yeung (who served as director of public policy & government relations at the LGBT Community Services Center). Verraros attended the ceremony as a guest.) and also served as a judge at the World of Chocolate, a charity event for the AIDS Foundation of Chicago. He participated in several local events around Chicago during this time and performed in multiple pride events, including the LA Pride and Chicago Pride parades. He also performed, along with American Idol second season third place finalist Kimberley Locke, at the Kansas City Gay Pride Festival in June and at the New York City Gay Life Expo in November. A club tour was considered to promote Rollercoaster.

=== 2006–2007: Eating Out 2: Sloppy Seconds and unrealized film projects ===
Twice in the mid-2000s, Verraros was called a "gay icon" by the Chicago Sun-Times, first in 2004, and again in 2006. The New York Post noted in 2006 that Verraros had "gained a cult following" due to his role in Eating Out. In 2009, PopCrush claimed that "almost immediately" after appearing on American Idol, Verraros had become "a huge symbol within the LGBT community", and that same year, the Washington Examiner wrote that Verraros "has been a fixture in the gay world...practically becoming a gay sex-symbol through the years." Verraros remained the only American Idol finalist to be publicly out until 2006, when his fellow first season finalist R.J. Helton came out. Helton had confided in Verraros about his sexual orientation on the night of the first-season finale, shortly before the group went on tour and before Helton had come out to any of the other first season finalists.

Verraros returned to the role of Kyle in Eating Out 2: Sloppy Seconds, (Note: In between the first and second Eating Out films, Verraros performed in a one-act play called My Republican Boyfriend, which was written by Chris Secor and presented as part of the show More Fourplay at the Actors Circle Theatre in the Spring of 2004.) which filmed during the Summer of 2006 and screened in several film festivals, before receiving a theatrical release on November 22. Brocka returned as co-writer, but passed directorial duties over to the first film's Film editor, Phillip J. Bartell. The film features a song written by Verraros and Lopez, called "You Make It Better", which was released as a single on July 17, 2007. Like its predecessor, Eating Out 2: Sloppy Seconds received mostly negative reviews. It was described as a cinematic landmark however, by multiple publications, for being the first sequel to a gay film.

I'm halfway through…It's going to be different…rock-ier, but I'm going to throw in some twists just to screw with people.

— Verraros discussing his second album in a 2007 interview.

In June 2006, the Windy City Times included Verraros in its "30 Under 30" list of young figures who had made positive contributions to the LGBTQ community. Throughout that year, Verraros continued performing at local events around Chicago; he was also featured on American Idol Rewind, filmed a guest appearance for the pilot of a cooking show called The Astrological Kitchen, and released a duet called "Sweat" with indie artist Jamie O'Brien. Once again, Verraros was named to Out magazine's "Most Intriguing People" list for that year.

In November 2006, it was reported that Verraros was living in East Dundee, Illinois, with his long-time boyfriend. It was also reported at this time that Verraros' second album would be released in 2007. In a December 2006 interview with gay-interest website Atlantaboy.com, Verraros said that Rollercoaster had been "pretty much all over the place" and that his next album would be "more focused", while in April 2007, the Daily Herald wrote that a follow-up to Rollercoaster was scheduled to be released that May. Verraros had also told Atlantaboy.com that he was "heading more toward the film thing" and that if he ever released a music video, he would hope to co-direct it. Around this time, he mentioned that he had been cast in three films; one was described as a dark LA-based romance, in which he would play a cocaine addict who falls in love with a struggling actor, another, referred to by the title Copacabana: Of Love and Shadows, was described as a Rio de Janeiro-based musical, in which Verraros would play both male and female roles; (Note: Copacabana: Of Love and Shadows was said to be co-starring Peter Paige and had Roberto Jabor listed as the director. It was set to begin filming in March 2008, although four years later, MTV reported that the film was still unreleased.) and the third, referred to by the title Pizza on Sunset, was described as a gay LA-based romantic comedy. By July 2007, Verraros still had not released his second album. It was announced over the summer that he was "writing and recording [the album] in Malibu, California" with producers Gary Miller and John Porter. On a July podcast for the Windy City Times, Verraros said that he was aiming for a January 2008 release.

=== 2007–present: Return to American Idol-related projects, marriage, and Do Not Disturb ===
The 2007 book Chicken Soup for the American Idol Soul by Jack Canfield, Mark Victor Hansen, and Deborah Poneman, features a chapter about Verraros, which Poneman called her favorite story in the book. During a press interview, Poneman said, "I thought it was so amazing that a kid got to number eight or nine on 'American Idol' with parents who are deaf...His story makes me cry, when he realized that even though the whole country was cheering for him because they loved his voice, the two people that he loved the most would never be able to hear him sing." Verraros appeared at multiple book signings in Illinois during January 2008 with Poseman and American Idol sixth season finalist Gina Glocksen.

If 'You Make it Better', a single released in 2007, says anything it says Verraros is a talented singer that can do more than just make club music for the crowd he keeps on catering to. Maybe it's time to pull the shirt back down and expand his horizon with credible and relatable lyrics and music.

— Samuel Lora, writing for the Washington Examiner in August 2009, after the release of "Touch (Don't U Want 2)" and "Electric Love" as singles.

Throughout the first half of 2008, Verraros recapped the seventh season of American Idol for ChicagoPride.com and co-hosted video recaps of that season with Penny Frulla for AfterElton.com. He was also featured on Usmagazine.com as a guest recapper for that season's Top 12 episode. In January 2008, the Chicago Free Press named Verraros "Best LGBT Musician of 2007" in its "Pressie Awards". In a subsequent Myspace post expressing his gratitude for the award, Verraros announced that his second album, which still had not been released, would be called Do Not Disturb (AfterElton.com had previously reported that the album would be called Chapter Two). Verraros accepted the Pressie award in March, around which time he said that Do Not Disturb would be "coming out in the next couple of months."

Verraros cameoed as a priest in Another Gay Sequel: Gays Gone Wild!, which was released in the Summer of 2008. That same year, the electronica album Ear Therapy was released by DJ Russ Harris, which features Verraros on the track "Another Lifetime", and the following year, Verraros released three new singles on iTunes – "Touch (Don't U Want 2)" on January 20; (Note: A snippet of "Touch (Don't U Want 2)" had previously been previewed on Idol Chat, the video recap series that Verraros did for AfterElton.com with Penny Frulla in 2008. Verraros had also released the song through his MySpace page around that time.) "Electric Love" on May 26; and "Do Not Disturb" on November 9. All three songs were written and produced by Gabe Lopez, whose official website announced that the accompanying album's release date had been pushed back to late 2010. (Note: An August 2009 article by the Windy City Times had previously reported that the album Do Not Disturb would be released that summer. Shortly before his wedding in September 2009, Verraros said that the album would "definitely be released by the end of the year".) Samuel Lora of the Washington Examiner gave "Touch (Don't U Want 2)" a negative review, calling it "simple and vapid". He also wrote that the song "is overdone with heavy beats and crowding vocals". "Electric Love" fared somewhat better with Lora, who called it "pretty decent" but also felt that it was mimicking the sound of other, more successful artists. Lora likened the song to a "less powerful" version of "Larger Than Life" by the Backstreet Boys or something by "Nick Carter if he were making Justin Timberlake music". Lora had kinder words for "You Make It Better", which had been released as a single two years earlier.

In November 2009, Verraros served as a judge for Rialto Idol, a singing competition held by the Rialto Square Theatre for the ComEd Festival of Trees. Entertainment Weekly reported in March 2010 that Verraros was looking for "an indie label to release [Do Not Disturb]." Several years earlier, in 2006, Verraros had mentioned the possibility of his second album being released through Sony BMG's then-newly formed gay-focused label, "Music With a Twist". Ultimately, Do Not Disturb was released on October 18, 2011, through Red Queen Music – Sound Axis. Ten tracks are included on the album, out of dozens that were written and recorded throughout the development process. Verraros told Entertainment Weekly in 2010 that Do Not Disturb would likely be his final album, saying "I think I'd like to just pull away [from singing] and focus [more on acting]."

==== Marriage ====
People say, 'Why are you even doing it if it's not even legal?' We don't have to wait for the government to tell us it's okay, we're doing it anyway. It's more about our family and friends and people we care about witnessing something that is true and beautiful.

— Verraros on his marriage to Bill Brennan.

On September 6, 2009, Verraros married Bill Brennan in their shared home state of Illinois. The couple first met through MySpace in 2005, at which point they decided to meet in person, after realizing that they only lived about twenty minutes away from each other. A few months later, they moved in together. Brennan proposed to Verraros two-and-a-half years after they began dating. Although Illinois did not legally recognize gay marriage in 2009, Verraros said that he and Brennan "wanted the day to be a reflection of [their] love and commitment to each other as well as a statement to other gay couples in Illinois". Each of the groom's fathers served as their best men in the wedding. The song "You Make It Better" from the film Eating Out 2: Sloppy Seconds was written by Verraros about Brennan and was included in the music set list for their wedding. The marriage was later legalized in Iowa.

Brennan is the president of Bridal Expo Chicago and Bridal Expo Milwaukee. In 2006, Verraros signed an endorsement deal to serve as spokesman for the business; he eventually became executive vice president. Kelly Clarkson and Verraros maintained a friendship after competing on American Idol together, and Verraros helped design the headpiece that Clarkson wore for her 2013 wedding.

By 2019, Verraros and Brennan had separated. Verraros is currently engaged. On November 20, 2021, Verraros married Sean Michael Buck.

== Filmography ==
- American Idol Season 1 (2002) – Himself
- Eating Out (2004) – Kyle
- Eating Out 2: Sloppy Seconds (2006) – Kyle
- Another Gay Sequel: Gays Gone Wild! (2008) – Priest

== Discography ==
=== Studio albums ===
- Rollercoaster (2005)
- Do Not Disturb (2011)

=== Extended plays ===
- Explicit (2025)

=== Others ===
- Unsaid and Understood (Unreleased demo album) (2003)

=== Compilations appearances ===
Year	Title	Peak chart positions	Details
Year	Title	US	Details
2002	American Idol: Greatest Moments	4	Credited on the following tracks: "Easy" (Solo performance); "California Dreamin'" (Group performance)

=== Singles ===
Year	Song	Peak chart positions		Album	Ref.
Year	Song	US Dance Club	UK Dance Club	Album	Ref.
2005	"You Turn It On"	21	—	Rollercoaster	
2005	"You're Getting Crazy (Estas Enloqueciendo)"	—	—	Rollercoaster	
2007	"You Make It Better"	—	—	Non-album single	
2009	"Touch (Don't U Want 2)"	—	—	Do Not Disturb	
2009	"Electric Love"	—	—	Do Not Disturb	
2009	"Do Not Disturb"	—	—	Do Not Disturb	
2023	"Take My Bow"	—	15	Explicit	
2024	"Pyramid"	—	—	Explicit	

=== As featured artist ===
Year	Track	Album	Ref.
2008	"Another Lifetime" (DJ Russ Harris featuring Jim Verraros)	Ear Therapy	
