= American Idols Live! Tour 2002 =

2002 concert tour

- Tour by American Idol
- EJay Day, RJ Helton, AJ Gil; Tamyra Gray, Kelly Clarkson, Ryan Starr; Justin Guarini, Nikki McKibbin, Christina Christian, Jim Verraros
- Start date: October 8, 2002
- End date: November 20, 2002
- No. of shows: 30 in North America
- Box office: $8.1 million

American Idol concert chronology
- American Idols Live! Tour 2002 (2002); American Idols Live! Tour 2003 (2003)

The American Idols Live! Tour 2002 was a fall concert tour featuring the top ten contestants of the inaugural season of American Idol, which aired earlier that year. The tour visited 30 cities across the United States starting October 8, 2002 in San Diego, and became the template for concerts tours following each of the succeeding American Idol seasons. Select performances of Clarkson are also released in the Miss Independent DVD album in 2003.

== Performers ==
Kelly Clarkson (winner)	Justin Guarini (runner-up)
Nikki McKibbin (3rd place)	Tamyra Gray (4th place)
RJ Helton (5th place)	Christina Christian (6th place)
Ryan Starr (7th place)	AJ Gil (8th place)
Jim Verraros (9th or 10th place)	EJay Day (9th or 10th place)

== Show overview ==
The show, as well as those from all subsequent tours, was organized into two halves. The first half had the Top 10 contestants performing a song each in elimination order, with Kelly Clarkson the winner ending this section. Each performer was introduced by the preceding performer accompanied by a video montage of their time on American Idol, the exception being the first performer EJay Day who was introduced by Randy Jackson on video. Most of the solo performances were of songs the performer had previously done on the television show.

After the intermission, the second half started with the guys and the girls each performing a group song, with the rest of the show consisted of a series of group numbers with medley of songs interspersed with some solo performances, similar in style to the television special "American Idol in Las Vegas" aired after Season 1 finale. The runner-up Justin Guarini and the winner Kelly Clarkson each had their final solo performance before the last group songs by the Top 10 finalists which ended the show.

== Set list ==
1. EJay Day – "Black Cat" (Janet Jackson)
2. Jim Verraros – "Easy" (Commodores)
3. AJ Gil – "My Cherie Amour" (Stevie Wonder)
4. Ryan Starr – "If You Really Love Me" (Stevie Wonder)
5. Christina Christian – "Ain't No Sunshine" (Bill Withers)
6. R. J. Helton – "Lately" (Stevie Wonder)
7. Tamyra Gray – "I'm Every Woman" (Chaka Khan)
8. Nikki McKibbin – "Piece of My Heart" (Janis Joplin)
9. Justin Guarini – "Get Here" (Oleta Adams)
10. Kelly Clarkson – "Respect" (Aretha Franklin)

Intermission

11. Guys – "Pop" ('N Sync)
12. Girls – "Free Your Mind" (En Vogue)
13. Guarini – "For Once in My Life" (Stevie Wonder)
14. Clarkson – "(You Make Me Feel Like) A Natural Woman" (Aretha Franklin)
15. Group – Soul Medley
  1. "Dancing in the Street" (Group)
  2. "Get Ready" (Guys)
  3. "I Can't Help Myself (Sugar Pie Honey Bunch)" (Helton)
  4. "Reach Out I'll Be There" (Group)
  5. "You Are the Sunshine of My Life" (Verraros)
  6. "You're All I Need" (Clarkson)
  7. "My Guy" (Girls)
  8. "My Girl" (Guys)
  9. "Ain't No Mountain High Enough" (Group)
16. McKibbin – "Rhiannon" (Fleetwood Mac)
17. Gray – "A House Is Not a Home" (Dionne Warwick)
18. Group Medley – "Celebration" (Group)
  1. "Ain't No Stoppin' Us Now" (Group)
  2. "We Are Family" (Girls)
  3. "Love Machine" (Guys)
  4. "Fantasy" (Group)
  5. "Boogie Wonderland" (Group)
19. Guarini – "Let's Stay Together" (Al Green)
20. Clarkson – "A Moment Like This" (Kelly Clarkson)
21. Group – "That's What Friends Are For" (Dionne Warwick and Friends)
22. Group – "I'll Be There" (The Jackson 5)

=== Additional notes ===
- Kelly Clarkson performed her single "Before Your Love" instead of "A Moment Like This" on some shows.

== Tour dates ==
Date (2002)	City	Venue	Attendance (percentage)
October 8	San Diego	Cox Arena	92.9%
October 9	Phoenix	America West Arena	76.9%
October 12	San Antonio	Freeman Coliseum	77.3%
October 13	Dallas	American Airlines Center	97.5%
October 14	Houston	Compaq Center	62.5%
October 15	Rosemont	Allstate Arena	67.7%
October 17	Detroit	Fox Theatre	100%
October 18	Cincinnati	U.S. Bank Arena	58.9%
October 19	Nashville	Gaylord Entertainment Center	49.6%
October 21	Atlanta	Philips Arena	94.1%
October 23	Tampa	Ice Palace	63.6%
October 24	Sunrise	National Car Rental Center	98.5%
October 27	Uniondale	Nassau Coliseum	95.8%
October 28	Worcester	Worcester's Centrum Centre	100%
October 29	Albany	Pepsi Arena	81.7%
October 31	East Rutherford	Continental Airlines Arena	50.2%
November 1	Wilkes-Barre	First Union Arena	97.1%
November 2	Atlantic City	Etess Arena	100%
November 3	Washington, D.C.	MCI Center	100%
November 5	St. Louis	Savvis Center	92.1%
November 6	Columbus	Nationwide Arena	86.7%
November 7	Indianapolis	Conseco Fieldhouse	67.5%
November 8	Cleveland	CSU Convocation Center	95.4%
November 10	Saint Paul	Xcel Energy Center	65.8%
November 12	Denver	Magness Arena	80.6%
November 15	Anaheim	Theater at the Arrowhead Pond	94.0%
November 16	Sacramento	ARCO Arena	100%
November 17	San Jose	Compaq Center	97.2%
November 19	Portland	Rose Garden Arena	95.7%
November 20	Seattle	KeyArena	89.2%

== Response ==
The response to the tour was well-received, with some dates sold out and most generally did well. A total of 258,526 tickets were sold with a revenue of $8,119,342 as reported by Billboard.
