= R. J. Helton =

American Christian musician (born 1981)

R.J. Helton
- Also known as: Richard Jason Helton
- Born: Rolando Alberto de Jesus Rivas, Jr. May 17, 1981 (age 45); Pasadena, Texas
- Origin: Cumming, Georgia
- Genres: Christian pop
- Occupations: Singer, songwriter
- Instruments: vocals, singer-songwriter
- Years active: 2002–2014
- Label: GospoCentric

Richard Jason Helton (born May 17, 1981; as Rolando Alberto de Jesus Rivas, Jr.) is an American Contemporary Christian music artist, who first came to prominence as the fifth place finalist on the first season of American Idol. The first Wild Card contestant in the history of the series, they initially failed to reach the Top 10, but they were brought back by the judges to compete in the finals. In 2004, they released the album Real Life with GospoCentric Records, which peaked at number 14 on the Billboard Christian Music chart and number 19 on the Heatseekers Albums chart. Helton's song "My Devotion" was nominated for Urban Recorded Song of the Year at the 36th GMA Dove Awards in 2005.

== Early life and background ==
Helton was born in Pasadena, Texas, on May 17, 1981, as Rolando Alberto de Jesus Rivas, Jr., to a Nicaraguan father. Shortly after their birth, they were adopted and renamed Richard Jason Helton. At the time of Helton's American Idol appearance, their adoptive parents, Glen and Sue Helton, worked respectively as a vice president of Popeyes Chicken and as an administrative assistant for an architecture firm. From the age of three, Helton impressed their parents with vocal imitations of various music artists. They sang in church growing up and started performing in talent shows at age five. Soon after, they were enrolled in a performing arts school. By high school, they were involved in community theater. Before going on American Idol, they were a youth worship leader at their church.

When Helton first started performing music publicly as a child, they still lived in Pasadena, but their father's job caused the family to move frequently. Helton lived in Winston-Salem, North Carolina when they were in middle school. They transferred schools about a dozen times until they were midway through ninth grade, at which time their family established long-term residency in the Atlanta area. They graduated from Central Gwinnett High School in 1999.

At age sixteen, Helton began performing in schools across the East Coast and the Ohio Valley, as part of a music tour that was sponsored by Reader's Digest. Helton performed over 150 shows on the tour, over the course of two years. Paula Abdul and the Backstreet Boys had both performed in earlier versions of that same tour at the start of their respective careers.

After high school, Helton moved to Nashville, Tennessee, where they joined a Christian boyband called Soul Focus. While in Nashville, they also worked as a waiter. According to the bio on Helton's (now-defunct) official website, Soul Focus "was invited to tour with a major Christian artist." A 2004 profile on Helton published by CCM Magazine wrote that, around the time that Helton was in Soul Focus, "he went on the road for another artist, selling merchandise". By the end of 2001, Soul Focus had disbanded without a record deal. Helton then moved back to Atlanta, where, according to CCM Magazine, they worked as "a personal trainer and a gymnastics instructor for children." The Atlanta Journal-Constitution reported that, before they went on American Idol, Helton "taught dance" at the YMCA in Alpharetta, Georgia.

Before moving to Nashville to join Soul Focus, Helton had recorded demo albums that, according to the Mansfield News Journal, had been "turned down by a few record companies." Helton later recounted their experiences in Nashville, saying, "I was kind of discouraged when I got back, but I've never been the type to just give up when I've got my sights set on something. I had learned a lot from the whole Soul Focus experience that really prepared me for things that were to come." Less than a week after resettling in Atlanta, Helton learned through a television commercial about the auditions for American Idol's first season.

In addition to Christian music, Helton was inspired by a variety of genres, including R&B, pop, and contemporary country. Around the time of their American Idol audition, Plus One, Jars of Clay, and India Arie were among their favorite artists. They have also cited Mariah Carey, Boyz II Men, Bryan White, Vince Gill, and Natalie Grant as some of their primary musical influences.

== American Idol ==
Helton auditioned for season one of American Idol in Atlanta. They were the first person to audition in the city. Their performance during the Top 30 semi-finals polarized the judges, causing Simon Cowell and Randy Jackson to break into a lengthy argument. Although the conflict was real, it was partially redubbed and also edited together with staged takes before going to air, so as to make it less heated. In his 2011 book, American Idol: The Untold Story, Richard Rushfield noted that even as the fight was sanitized for broadcast, American Idol "reveled in the altercation" and "was all but turned over to repeating the clips". Rushfield identified this as a defining moment in the early history of reality television, writing, "All of a sudden, here was this renegade show, American Idol, that was celebrating its backstory, playing up its frictions, and openly acknowledging its missteps. Every tabloid brouhaha would be played up on the Idol stage rather than being shoved under the carpet. It was completely unprecedented in American programming."

Although not voted through to the Top 10 during the semi-finals, Helton was chosen by the judges as the season's only Wild Card finalist. While participating in a photo shoot during the first week of the finals, they fell off a stage and was briefly hospitalized. Helton's performances throughout the finals continued to divide the judges, and they were voted out of the competition in fifth place. A week after they left the competition, Q100 radio hosted a homecoming party for Helton at the Mall of Georgia.

The 2005 book Uncloudy days : the gospel music encyclopedia by Bil Carpenter summarized Helton's time on American Idol by writing, "Though he has a pleasant, smooth vocal, he was criticized by the judges for having a somewhat stiff and wooden stage presence." Carpenter called Helton "A well-mannered, humble Christian" and felt that these attributes were not always appreciated by the media. Burt Bacharach, who mentored each finalist during Top 5-week of the competition, complimented Helton as having "a real sweetness about his persona".

During the competition, Rodney Ho of The Atlanta Journal-Constitution wrote that Helton "exudes an enduring innocence". He further called Helton a "sweet teenybopper favorite" who had "shown surprising strength in the competition" and praised Helton's performance of the Stevie Wonder song "Superstition". However Ho also considered Helton less attention-grabbing than some of the other finalists from American Idol's first season. While Kevin D. Thompson of The Palm Beach Post expressed admiration for Helton's ability to rise above Simon Cowell's criticism, he concurred with Ho a few weeks into the finals that Helton was likely to be overshadowed by some of the other competitors. By the Top 6 round, Zap2It called Helton one of the "longshots" to win the competition. Richard L. Eldredge of The Atlanta Journal-Constitution considered Helton's elimination from the series a "surprise", noting that Helton's performance during Top 5-week had been well received. Ho disagreed, expressing the view that Helton was an underdog who had "lasted longer than many expected".

During their time on American Idol, Sharon Waxman of The Ottawa Citizen called Helton a "heartthrob", while Carla Hay of Billboard described them as a "singer with teen Idol looks". An article published by Northwest Florida Daily News at the time likened Helton to The Backstreet Boys. Further boyband comparisons came from Dana Gee of The Province, who wrote that Helton had that "cross between Joey Fatone and Lance Bass thing going on", Julie Hinds of the Detroit Free Press, who wrote that Helton possessed "the peppy personality of a boy-band star", and Jessica Shaw of Entertainment Weekly, who upon Helton's elimination from the competition wrote, "I'm sure there are a few prayer-loving teens who are weeping their eyes out, but the rest of us know what Simon knew all along: This guy was barely good enough to be a boy-band understudy." John Benson of the Mansfield News Journal described Helton instead as "falling somewhere between Boyz II Men and Craig David". Tom Conroy of US Weekly compared Helton to Jon Secada, writing that the two singers shared "the same endearing humility, brimming passion and sturdy-but-not-flashy vocal style."

=== Performances ===
Week	Theme	Song	Original artist	Result
Audition	Free Choice	"Never Can Say Goodbye"	The Jackson 5	Advanced
Hollywood	Free Choice	"(Sittin' On) The Dock of the Bay"	Otis Redding	Advanced
Semi-final Group 3	Free Choice	"I'll Be There"	The Jackson 5	Wild Card
Wild Card	Free Choice	"Lately"	Stevie Wonder	Advanced
Top 10	Motown	"I Can't Help Myself (Sugar Pie Honey Bunch)"	Four Tops	Safe
Top 8	1960s	"Under the Boardwalk"	The Drifters	Safe
Top 7	1970s	"Superstition"	Stevie Wonder	Safe
Top 6	Big Band	"I Won't Dance"	Fred Astaire & Ginger Rogers	Bottom 2
Top 5	Burt Bacharach Love Songs	"Arthur's Theme (Best That You Can Do)"	Christopher Cross	Eliminated

== Music career ==
=== 2002–2003: American Idol tours and related projects ===
Helton returned to American Idol shortly after their fifth-place finish on the series to perform a group medley during the season one finale and to participate in the two-hour American Idol in Las Vegas TV special. Through October and November 2002, they joined their fellow finalists from that season of the series as a performer on the American Idols Live! Tour. During that tour, they reprised their performance of the Stevie Wonder song "Lately", which they'd performed on American Idol during the wild-card round. Helton also recorded "Lately" for the compilation album, American Idol: Greatest Moments, which charted at number four on the Billboard 200. USA Today considered Helton's track to be one of the album's highlights, describing it as "a sweetly affecting cover".

Shortly before the 2002 American Idol tour, The St. Petersburg Times reported that Helton was "talking to record labels" and pursuing a career in Christian music. On November 28, 2002, Helton performed during the lighting of Macy's Great Tree at the Rich's department store in Atlanta's Lenox Square. (Note: Also performing at the event were Charlotte Church, Usher, Jaci Velasquez, Francine Reed, the Georgia Mass Choir, and B5.) By the end of 2002, Helton had established a deal to appear alongside other American Idol finalists in commercials for Old Navy. Throughout the Spring of 2003, Helton participated in Coca-Cola's Behind the Scenes With American Idol promotional tour, in which he and a selection of other finalists from the first two seasons of the series performed across the country in shopping malls owned by the Simon Property Group. In May of that year, The Atlanta Journal-Constitution reported that Helton had been cast "in a local independent film" titled Mrs. Johnson. That June, Helton performed at the Southeast Emmy Awards and in a benefit concert for community service organizations in Forsyth, Georgia. Towards the end of 2003, Helton participated in The Hollywood Reporter/Billboard Film & TV Music Conference.

=== 2003–2005: GospoCentric Records ===
During their time on American Idol, Helton said that they would likely title a debut album I'm Real. They expressed satisfaction with their fifth-place finish on the series, saying that they were glad to avoid the restrictive contract offered to the winner. In May 2003, it was reported that they had signed with B-Rite Music, the pop music imprint of Christian music label GospoCentric Records. At the time, their debut album was scheduled to be released that fall. Helton told CCM Magazine that they signed with B-Rite Music after first turning down offers from secular labels. They explained that their choice of record label was largely driven by a desire to be on the same label as Kirk Franklin, describing the singer as an inspiration "who broke down so many walls [between the mainstream and Christian markets]". Shortly after the record deal was announced, Billboard reported that Helton's album would feature "an inspirational gospel feel and mainstream appeal". Leading up to the album's release, Helton was featured on the compilation album Gotta Have Gospel, which was released on November 11, 2003, as a collaboration between GospoCentric Records and Integrity Gospel. "My Devotion", from Helton's then-upcoming debut album, was their featured track on Gotta Have Gospel. According to Billboard, the song "became a hit in the United Kingdom and [was] played in clubs in the United States." "My Devotion" earned Helton a nomination for Urban Recorded Song of the Year at the 36th GMA Dove Awards.

After missing its initial Fall 2003 release date, Helton's debut album, Real Life, was set to be released on March 9, 2004. After a second delay, the album was released on March 23 of that year. The album charted on Billboard, peaking at number 14 on the Christian Albums chart and at number 19 on the Heatseekers Albums chart. The song "All We Need to Know" was released as a single ahead of the album. "Even If" was also released as a single from the album that year.

At the start of their career, Helton was managed by their mom. In April 2004, it was reported that they had signed a deal with Music World to be managed by Mathew Knowles. Throughout the Spring of that year, Helton and American Idol season 2 finalist Kimberley Locke both provided commentary on American Idol's third season for USA Today, alongside "Weird Al" Yankovic and Edna Gundersen. On April 29, 2004, Helton performed at the Billboard Latin Music Conference. That same month, they performed at Fort Hood in a homecoming celebration for a portion of the United States Army's 4th Infantry Division, after members of that division participated in the capturing of Saddam Hussein. (Note: Jessica Simpson, Randy Travis, Ludacris, cheerleaders from the Dallas Cowboys and the New England Patriots, Lynyrd Skynyrd, Eddie Griffin, Stone Cold Steve Austin, and Kimberley Locke also performed at the event.) On May 6 of that year, Helton sang the National Anthem at Daytona International Speedway for a National Day of Prayer event. (Note: Casting Crowns also performed at the event.) On June 18, they performed at the 2004 Visalia Chamber of Commerce 51st annual Awards Banquet. (Note: Matthew West and Jadon Lavik also performed at the event.) Later that month, they performed at Mega Fest, a conference held in Atlanta by Bishop T. D. Jakes. (Note: Patti LaBelle, India Arie, Mary Mary, and Kirk Franklin also performed at the event.) Helton also performed in a concert that month at the Christian Booksellers Association International Convention in Atlanta. (Note: Rob Lacey, BarlowGirl, Michael Cook, and KJ-52 also performed at the event.) and at the KXOJ Freedom Live concert. (Note: TobyMac, ZOEgirl, Plus One, Todd Agnew, Warren Barfield, Bethany Dillon, Sanctus Real, Nate Sallie, Sky Harbor, and Starfield also performed at the event.)

On July 5, 2004, Helton served as a judge for the Reno Idol singing competition, which was held at the Eldorado Hotel-Casino. On August 28, they served as a judge for another singing competition, this one held, as part of a fundraiser with a Christian ministry, at Prairie du Chien High School. The following year, on July 8, they served as a judge for the Fayette Idol singing competition in Fayetteville. In August 2005, they performed in the 14th annual Powerlight Christian music festival at the Illinois State Fair. That same month, they told The Atlanta Journal-Constitution that they had begun working on a second album, which, the publication wrote, would go in "an unspecified new direction". Helton said at the time, "Stay with me and hold on tight, because this change in music is about to be a joyous, fun and bumpy ride."

=== 2006–present: Later career ===
By 2006, Helton's music career had stalled. That year, in October, during a conversation with Larry Flick on the LGBTQ-focused radio program OutQ in the Morning, in response to a question about why they were no longer making music, Helton came out as gay and said, "I can have a faith but can't be who I want to be. So a lot of it was just personal things I needed to overcome and just be proud of who I was. ... Just because I am gay does not mean I can't love God." Helton later told The Advocate that when they were on American Idol, they had come out to "some of the assistant producers" but had been "advised" to keep their sexuality private. Around the time of the American Idol tour in 2002, Helton had come out to their fellow season one finalist Jim Verraros, who is also gay. After Helton came out publicly, Verraros said, "I can't even imagine how difficult it was dealing with the gospel community and putting out a Christian record; having this kind of secret must have been really trying for him."

In November 2006, Helton spoke to The Atlanta Journal-Constitution about their decision to come out, saying, "Before it came out in a negative way, I wanted to make sure I was able to tell the public myself the way I wanted to tell them." The publication reported at the time that Helton was "living in New York", "writing an autobiography", and "hoping to get into music producing and songwriting." In 2007, Helton was a performer on the Caribbean Princess, as part of RSVP Vacation's Caribbean Fantasy Cruise. Later that year, it was reported that they were living in San Francisco. In June of that year, they performed in St. Louis PrideFest, and in July of that year, they performed at the Cathedral of Hope. Over the summer of 2008, Helton joined with former American Idol finalists Haley Scarnato, Brandon Rogers, Scott Savol, Vonzell Solomon, and Carmen Rasmussen for "America's Favorite Finalists", a month long show in Branson, Missouri. Later that summer, they joined with a rotating group of former American Idol finalists for "Idols in Concert", an event organized by American Idol pianist and arranger Michael Orland, which was held at the Hotel Nikko in San Francisco. The following year, starting in May, Helton joined with former American Idol finalists Nikki McKibbin, Mikalah Gordon, and Jasmine Trias for "Idolized", a show held in Las Vegas. That November, they and Gordon joined with former American Idol finalists Chikezie and Trenyce for a concert at Slippery Rock University. In April 2010, Helton participated in Idol Gives Back by joining with Feeding America and City Harvest to support food banks in New York City. In August of that year, they performed in Madison Wisconsin's Pride Fest. Over the summer of 2012, Helton joined with former American Idol finalists Ruben Studdard, Bo Bice, Vonzell Solomon, and Katie Stevens for The Finalists Live, a fifteen-week music tour. In August 2015, Helton performed in the Stockton Pride Festival.

The album Scott Alan Live, released June 26, 2012, features Helton singing the track "Blessing". The song, written by Alan, expresses the experience of coming out as gay to a parent. The Advocate described "Blessing" as an "emotional performance". Helton later recorded a studio version of the song for the album Scott Alan's GREATEST HITS, VOL. 1, which was released on November 4, 2014.

== Personal life ==
Helton came out as gay in 2006, and non-binary in 2024.

Helton uses they/them pronouns.

== Discography ==
=== Albums ===
Title	Album details	Peak chart positions	
Title	Album details	US Chr	US Heat
Real Life	Released: March 23, 2004; Label: GospoCentric; CD, digital download	14	19

=== Demo albums ===
Title	Album details	Track listing
R. Jay	Released: 1999; Label: Dryden Entertainment Inc.; CD	When You Touch Me; You Saved Me; Where Is Your Heart; Rachel's Song; Praise Him; His Eye Is on the Sparrow (Acappella)
Demo Album #2	CD	His Eye Is on the Sparrow; Let Me At Your Heart; If It Breaks My Heart; Maybe Manana; Blinded By the Blue

=== Compilation appearances ===
Title	Details	Peak chart positions
Title	Details	US
American Idol: Greatest Moments	Released October 1, 2002; Label: RCA; Credited on the following track(s): "Lately" (Solo performance); "California Dreamin'" (Group performance)	4
Gotta Have Gospel	Released November 11, 2003; Label: GospoCentric Records / Integrity Gospel; Credited on the following track(s): "My Devotion"	-
Scott Alan Live	Released June 26, 2012; Label: Billy-Boo Records; Credited on the following track(s): "Blessing"	-
Scott Alan's GREATEST HITS, VOL. 1	Released November 4, 2014; Label: Billy-Boo Records; Credited on the following track(s): "Blessing" (Studio Version)	-

=== Singles ===
Year	Song	Album
2004	"All We Need to Know"	Real Life
2004	"Even If"	Real Life

=== Promotional singles ===
Year	Song	Notes
2004	RJ Helton - Even If (Jones & Sol Pacifico's Vibelicious Island Breeze Club Mix)	Released as an exclusive through Helton's official fan club RJAholics.com.

== Awards and nominations ==
Year	Award	Recipient	Category	Result	Ref.
2005	GMA Dove Award	"My Devotion"	Urban Recorded Song of the Year	Nominated	
