= AJ Gil =

American singer, songwriter, and actor (born 1984)

- Born: Abner Juda Gil; July 5, 1984 (age 42); San Diego, California, United States
- Genres: Pop, R&B, Christian music
- Occupations: Singer-songwriter, actor
- Years active: 2002–present
- Label: Juda Music Productions

Abner Juda Gil (born July 5, 1984) is an American singer, songwriter, and actor, who placed eighth during the first season of American Idol. Following his participation on the Fox reality series, he released two mixtapes, as well as several standalone singles. He also starred in the 2005 independent film Destination Fame. Throughout his career, Gil has collaborated with a variety of artists. He was the first Latino to ever place on American Idol, and several of his songs are in Spanish.

The 2002 compilation album American Idol: Greatest Moments, which reached No. 4 on the Billboard 200 chart, features Gil covering "My Cherie Amour" by Stevie Wonder as one of its tracks. A few months after competing on American Idol, Gil went on a nationwide tour with the other season one finalists. His first radio single, "She's Hot" (featuring the artist Max-A-Million), was written for the film Destination Fame, although the song was released in 2003, two years before the film's premiere.

Upon founding his own recording studio, Juda Music Productions, Gil began a career in R&B, which culminated with the 2011 release of his first mixtape, Love Me Later. Gil's second mixtape, Life, Death & Resurrection, marked a transition to Christian music and was released in 2013.

== Early life ==
Abner Juda Gil, known professionally as AJ Gil, was born on July 5, 1984, in San Diego, California, to Martin and Teresa Gil. He is the fourth of ten children. His father, a minister and a missionary, moved the family to Mexico, when Gil was four years old. While there, they struggled financially. Gil assisted his family in selling street food and performing manual labor jobs. His family returned to the United States a few years later, and they settled in Tacoma, Washington, after living in a van for several months.

Gil first began playing the drums and guitar around the age of seven. He learned how to play the piano soon after. Growing up, he would often perform in his father's church. One of Gil's aunts was a regular performer on The Lawrence Welk Show, and around the time of Gil's participation on American Idol, one of Gil's cousins was a backup singer for Marc Anthony. Before going onto the Fox reality series, Gil had never been to a concert, despite his family connections to the music industry. Gil has cited Brian McKnight and Stevie Wonder as two of his primary musical influences.

== American Idol ==
Gil attended the auditions for American Idol's first season in Seattle. (Note: Gil learned about American Idol through his mother, who had seen a TV commercial for the series.) At the time, he was a seventeen year old rising senior at Lincoln High School. Initially unsure whether he would have a means of transportation, he was one of the last people to try out that day, and as he did not have a song prepared ahead of time, he chose "The Star-Spangled Banner", due to his familiarity with singing it in school. His rendition was well received by the judges and earned a standing ovation from Randy Jackson.

Upon advancing into the Top 30 semi-finals, Gil was placed into Group 2. He sang "All or Nothing" by O-Town. Both Paula Abdul and Simon Cowell complimented Gil's voice after the performance, but criticized his stage presence. Despite this lukewarm response from the judges, Gil was voted through to the Top 10. This made him the first Latino finalist in the history of American Idol. In-between his semi-final performance and the first week of the finals, Gil turned eighteen. He went on to perform "My Cherie Amour" by Stevie Wonder for the Top 10 Motown-themed round and "How Sweet It Is (To Be Loved by You)" by Marvin Gaye for the Top 8 1960s-themed round. (Note: There was no Top 9 round, because two finalists were eliminated during the Top 10 round.) The judges continued to offer faint praise, and Gil finished in eighth place.

"[Gil], the best dancer of the bunch, proved he would be the perfect replacement for the other A.J. (McLean, that is) should he ever leave his post as the bearded bad boy of the Backstreet Boys."

— Corey Moss of MTV, voicing one of many comparisons between Gil and various boy-band members.

Throughout his time on American Idol, Gil was often compared to various boy-band members, and he was described by Billboard as "a relatively reserved singer with teen-idol looks." Writing for the Boston Herald, Monica Collins considered Gil and fellow contestant EJay Day to be "'indistinguishable N Sync-ish names and faces". In an article for The Plain Dealer, Clint O'Connor wrote that Gil hailed from the "Backstreet Boys-'N Sync-wannabe collection." Jim Derogatis of the Chicago Sun-Times called Gil "a boy-band clone", and Chris Macias of the Sacramento Bee noted that Gil's popularity on the series could be partially attributed to a "boy-band look".

Music and TV critics, like the judges, were generally tepid about Gil's performances with American Idol. When Gil was eliminated from the competition, Jessica Shaw of Entertainment Weekly wrote, "I wish I could say A.J. would be missed from the competition, but he was so boring I can barely remember anything about him." Gil's vocals on the series and its accompanying album, American Idol: Greatest Moments, were deemed underwhelming by various publications and his stage presence during the competition was called "stiff" by Macias. Conversely, in an assessment of the top eight finalists for the Contra Costa Times, Deirdre McGruder wrote that Gil's vocals were almost comparable to those of Justin Timberlake. He named Gil as a potential front-runner in the competition, although he noted that Gil's stage presence was in need of improvement. Other positive reviews came from R.S. Murthi of the New Straits Times, who singled out Gil's recorded version of "My Cherie Amour" as one of the highlights on American Idol: Greatest Moments, and Cristin Maher of PopCrush, who wrote in a 2013 retrospective feature that Gil showed off "near-perfect crooning" in his live performance of that song.

Gil's rendition of "My Cherie Amour" was noted for having a Latin music influence. Critics diverged in opinions of Gil's approach to this material. Maura Johnston of Vulture voiced appreciation for Gil's decision to give the original's "French a slight Latin spin", but Derogatis was dismissive, writing that the song "doesn't work with a salsa beat".

Johnston was less favorable toward Gil's "How Sweet It Is" performance, writing that Gil's voice was "ill-served" by that song. Alan Pergament of The Buffalo News concurred, dubbing the performance "not-so-sweet". Johnston ultimately felt that Gil struggled in the competition due to American Idol's restrictive weekly themes. By the time of American Idol's season one tour, Corey Moss of MTV suggested that Gil's stage presence had improved, calling Gil "the best dancer" of all the male finalists. During one of American Idol's live episodes, Abdul remarked that Gil's best performance in the competition came during the Hollywood rounds – referencing a performance that was left unaired.

=== Performances ===
Episode	Theme	Song choice	Original artist	Order	Result
Audition	Contestant's Choice	"The Star-Spangled Banner"	N/A	N/A	Advanced
Top 30	Contestant's Choice	"All or Nothing"	O-Town	4	Advanced
Top 10	Motown	"My Cherie Amour"	Stevie Wonder	9	Safe
Top 8	1960s	"How Sweet It Is (To Be Loved by You)"	Marvin Gaye	4	Eliminated

== Career ==
=== 2002–2003: Destination Fame and New Artist Entertainment ===
About a month after being voted off American Idol, Gil opened the first ever concert at Seattle's then-new Seahawks Stadium, by singing the national anthem. The multi-headliner concert included Avril Lavigne, P. Diddy, Shaggy, and O-Town, among others. Gil then went on to participate in a group medley during American Idol's season one finale, and a few weeks after that, he reunited with the series' top thirty contestants to perform in the two-hour American Idol in Las Vegas TV special.

"[S]itting right there was AJ Gil, the American Idol contestant who'd made it to the Top 8 that first season. I knew every single song he'd performed on the show and really admired his beautiful tenor voice. To me, this guy was a huge celebrity and I was completely star struck. Here I was on the Jenny Jones Show, sharing a green room with one of the American Idols. This was more than big-time – this was it!"

— David Archuleta, in his 2010 memoir Chords of Strength.

Shortly after being eliminated from American Idol, Gil met an eleven-year-old David Archuleta, when the two were guests on The Jenny Jones Show. A week after that first meeting, they reunited in Los Angeles, where Gil introduced Archuleta to the other season one finalists. Video footage of this encounter, in which Archuleta sings for the group of finalists, was shown on the seventh season of American Idol, when Archuleta himself was a contestant.

Through October and November 2002, Gil participated in the 2002 American Idols LIVE! tour, along with his fellow top ten finalists. For each stop of the tour, Gil reprised his performance of "My Cherie Amour" from the series. He subsequently reunited with O-Town and American Idol season one tenth place finalist EJay Day to perform on a float for Give Kids the World in Pasadena, California's New Year's Day Rose Parade. Gil and Day sang "Calling All Angels", a song which had been specifically written for the Give Kids the World charity organization. The two later performed "Calling All Angels" at an Orlando, Florida fundraising gala in June and released this duet as a single through Give Kids the World.

Following his participation on American Idol, Gil recorded a version of "My Cherie Amour" that was featured on a compilation album of all the season one finalists. That album, American Idol: Greatest Moments, was released on October 1, 2002, and reached No. 4 on the Billboard 200 chart. Gil had announced during his time on American Idol that he hoped to title his debut album Thanx 2 U. In January 2003, USA Today reported that Gil was "working on demos with producers" and "hoping for a contract".

By March, Gil had moved to Orlando, and that month, he performed in "A Magical Night of Entertainment" by Radio Disney as part of New Port Richey, Florida's 81st annual Chasco Fiesta. In addition to his performances with Give Kids the World, Gil was involved with various other fundraising events throughout 2003. In April, he performed in at least three benefit concerts – one for the American Diabetes Association, which was held with 3rd Wish at Wet 'n Wild Orlando; one for Intervention Services Foster Children and HOPE Worldwide, which was held with Ronnie McDowell in the "Rally for America" festival at Orlando Festival Park; and one for the families of those killed in the Station nightclub fire, which was held with Blackhawk, Blue Öyster Cult, Billy Gilman, Justincase, Lennon Murphy, Rick Derringer, the Southern Rock Allstars, and Vanessa Olivarez, among others, at the Providence Performing Arts Center.

In May, the Toronto Star reported that Gil was "working on an album". Later that month, Gil opened the first concert of Danny Wood's solo career, and in July, Gil signed a five-year contract to New Artist Entertainment. That month, he performed at Neverland Ranch for Joe Jackson's birthday party.

Around that time, Gil was approached for the leading role in an independent film, titled Destination Fame. Playing the role of Chris, Gil starred alongside Joe Jackson, (Note: Destination Fame was Jackson's only film role.) Cuba Gooding Sr., Jordan Knight, Ricky Aiello (the son of Danny Aiello), Doug E. Fresh, and Mario. Filming on the project was underway by August and finished over the fall. First-time director Paul DeAngelo produced Destination Fame through his film production and music recording studio, Big Hit Entertainment. DeAngelo's hometown of Bayonne, New Jersey, was used as the filming location. One of the film's songs, "She's Hot", was released as a single by Gil (featuring Max-A-Million) in July 2003.

In December 2003, The News Tribune reported that Gil had recorded about thirty tracks for an album that was scheduled to be released the following year. Gil said, "I'm just trying to take my time, because I know if I rush it, it's not gonna make sense to people". Soon after speaking with the newspaper, Gil moved to Miami. The album was never released.

=== 2004–present: Juda Music Productions ===
Over the summer of 2004, Gil held a benefit concert at Blank Park Zoo in Des Moines, Iowa, for Drake University's Institute for Character Development. The following year, in May, Family Feud ran a span of episodes featuring Gil and various other American Idol finalists as the competitors. In-between those two appearances, People reported that Gil had parted ways with his manager over creative differences – his manager had wanted him to record pop music; Gil chose instead to pursue a career in R&B. Looking back in 2012, Gil told the Daily Beast that his manager had "swindled him by taking too much control". Gil became homeless, sometimes living with one of his sisters or one of his friends, and at other times living out of his car. By January 2005, Gil had found a new manager in Charlie Morgan. According to People, Gil had "start[ed] to record some R&B tracks" around this time and was also writing music for other artists. Destination Fame held its official premiere on October 27, 2005, in Bayonne, after screening one month earlier at the Temecula Valley International Film and Music Festival.

"Prior to writing this song God was really teaching me the value of keeping Him as the center and focus of my life ... Long story short, God took music away from me for almost two years which allowed me to spend time seeking God and knowing Him in a much deeper level."

— Gil, on the inspiration for his song "I Live".

By 2008, Gil had moved to California. In March of that year, USA Today reported that he was using his middle name Juda and studying music production at Los Angeles Recording School. Gil also opened a recording studio called Juda Productions around this time. On April 18 of that year, he performed the half-time show at a Hollywood Knights basketball game. (Note: Hollywood Knights raises money for high schools through basketball games played between celebrity figures and school faculties.) During a July interview with hiphopdelight.com, Gil remarked that he had completed an unspecified album. No album was released that year, but in 2009, he went on to release the non-album singles "Roll with Me" and "Work Your Body", the former of which features DJ Static of the German group Vibekingz and CLAiM.

In 2010, the official website for American Idol announced that Gil's new mixtape, Love Me Later, was scheduled to be released on July 20 of that year. After being made available to download through firm400entertainment.com, Love Me Later was officially released in January 2011. On September 7 of that year, the album Hollywood Freeway Music by the artist MDK was released, which features Gil on five of the eight tracks. Previously, Gil had collaborated with MDK on the non-album songs "Out of Control" and "My Future's Bright", the latter of which also features Young Fame. Other non-album songs released by Gil during this stage of his career include "She Likes it" (with Tommy Gunz and Johnathan Royster), "One Way Road" (with J-Nez), "Going Away", "I Try", and "I Regret It". Gil closed out 2011 by headlining the Wisconsin Chamber Orchestra's Middleton Holiday Pops Concert, which was held on November 27 and 28.

Gil subsequently switched genres to Christian music, and on July 26, 2013, he released a mixtape titled Life, Death & Resurrection. The mixtape features one Spanish-language track, "El Triunfo", and a bilingual cover of "Listen to My Heart" (originally recorded by Geoff Moore & the Distance under the title "Listen to Our Hearts"), which Mark Franklin of the York Dispatch deemed to be a "very pretty" rendition of the song. One of the mixtape's tracks, "I Live", was released as a single. Gil has a SoundCloud page for Juda Music Productions, on which several other songs of his can be heard.

== Discography ==
=== Love Me Later ===
Love Me Later

Mixtape by AJ Gil
- Released: 2011
- Genres: R&B, Soul
- Label: Juda Music Productions

==== Love Me Later Track Listing ====
No.	Title	Length
1.	"Ooh, Aah (Feeling Good)"	4:10
2.	"Sexin Rockin"	4:24
3.	"My Life"	2:47
4.	"Overtime"	4:51
5.	"Not Too Much"	3:35
6.	"Running from Love" (featuring Nick James)	4:05
7.	"Party with Me" (featuring Nikko Beason)	3:16
8.	"Break It Down"	3:35
9.	"Like a Star"	3:51

=== Life, Death & Resurrection ===
Life, Death & Resurrection

Mixtape by AJ Gil
- Released: July 26, 2013
- Genre: Christian music
- Label: Juda Music Productions

==== Life, Death & Resurrection Track Listing ====
Writing credits adapted from ajgilworld.com.

No.	Title	Writer(s)	Length
1.	"I Live"	AJ Gil; Michael B. Pratt	3:36
2.	"Life in God" (featuring Michael B. Pratt)	Gil; Pratt	4:28
3.	"Fast Lane"	Gil	3:38
4.	"Better Man"	Gil; Mike Rojas	4:59
5.	"Can You See?"	Gil; Pratt	4:26
6.	"El Triunfo"	Gil; Pratt	5:10
7.	"Listen to My Heart (Cover)"	Geoff Moore; Stephen Curtis Chapman; Gil (Note: "Listen to Our Hearts", covered by Gil under the title "Listen to My Heart", was written by Geoff Moore and Stephen Curtis Chapman. Gil's version of the song includes a Spanish-language verse, for which Gil receives a writing credit.)	4:14

=== Singles ===
Year	Single	Album
2003	"Calling All Angels" (with EJay Day)	Non-album single
2003	"She's Hot" (with Max-A-Million)	Non-album single
2008	"I Try"	Non-album single
2009	"Roll with Me" (with DJ Static and CLAiM)	Non-album single
2009	"Work Your Body"	Non-album single
2010	"Out of Control" (with MDK)	Non-album single
2011	"I Regret It"	Non-album single
2011	"She Likes It" (with Tommy Gunz and Johnathan Royster)	Non-album single
2011	"My Future's Bright" (with MDK and Young Fame)	Non-album single
2011	"One Way Road" (with J-Nez)	Non-album single
2012	"Going Away"	Non-album single
2013	"I Live"	Life, Death & Resurrection

=== As featured artist ===
Year	Album
2011	Hollywood Freeway Music

=== Compilation appearances ===
Year	Title	Peak chart positions	Details
Year	Title	US	Details
2002	American Idol: Greatest Moments	4	Credited on the following tracks: "My Cherie Amour" (Solo Performance); "California Dreamin'" (Group Performance)

=== Other songs ===
Year	Song	Note
N/A	"You Are Better"	Available on SoundCloud.
N/A	"Todo Es Tuyo"	Available on SoundCloud.
N/A	"Estrellas No Lloran"	Available on SoundCloud.
N/A	"Independiente"	Available on SoundCloud.
N/A	"Te Buscare"	Available on SoundCloud.
N/A	"Baila"	Available on SoundCloud.
N/A	"Dame"	Available on SoundCloud.
N/A	"Ready for War"	Available on SoundCloud.
N/A	"En La Luna"	Available on SoundCloud.
