= American Idol: Greatest Moments =

Soundtrack album by American Idol Season 1 Finalists
- Released: October 1, 2002
- Genre: Pop
- Length: 47:26
- Label: RCA
- Producer: James McMillan

American Idol chronology
American Idol: Greatest Moments (2002)	American Idol Season 2: All-Time Classic American Love Songs (2003)

American Idol: Greatest Moments is the first American Idol soundtrack, with music from the first season of American Idol. It contains two cover songs from both Kelly Clarkson and Justin Guarini, the winner and runner-up of the original season, one song from the remaining eight finalists, one song by all the finalists, and Clarkson's two songs from her debut single as bonus tracks. It is the only American Idol album that endorses the winner's single. The album was released on October 1, 2002.

The album debuted at number four on the US Billboard 200 album chart for the week ending October 6, 2002 and sold 146,000 copies that first week. It was certified gold on November 26, 2002, and had sold a total of 643,000 units by May 31, 2006.

== Track listing ==
1. "(You Make Me Feel Like) A Natural Woman" - Kelly Clarkson
2. "Respect" - Kelly Clarkson
3. "For Once in My Life" - Justin Guarini
4. "Get Here" - Justin Guarini
5. "Piece of My Heart" - Nikki McKibbin
6. "A House Is Not a Home" - Tamyra Gray
7. "Lately" - R. J. Helton
8. "Ain't No Sunshine" - Christina Christian
9. "If You Really Love Me" - Ryan Starr
10. "My Cherie Amour" - A. J. Gil
11. "I'll Be" - EJay Day
12. "Easy" - Jim Verraros
13. "California Dreamin'" - Finalists
14. "A Moment Like This" - Kelly Clarkson
15. "Before Your Love" - Kelly Clarkson
