= Christina Cewe =

American singer (born 1984)

- Born: Christina Christian; June 21, 1981 (age 45); New York City, United States
- Known for: American Idol (season 1) finalist
- Spouse: Nicholas Cewe

Christina Christian Cewe (born June 21, 1981) is an American singer and author notable for being a finalist on the first season of American Idol, and for being hospitalized immediately prior to her elimination.

== Background ==
Cewe was born Christina Christian in Brooklyn, New York, and grew up in North Miami and south Miami-Dade County. She is of Trinidadian descent. At the time of American Idol, Cewe was an undergraduate at the University of Florida majoring in sociology.

== American Idol ==
Cewe (as Christina Christian) successfully auditioned for the first season of American Idol in Miami with the Stevie Wonder song "Isn't She Lovely?" and subsequently advanced through Hollywood Week and the Top 30, Top 10, Top 8 and Top 7 rounds. Her performance of "Ain't No Sunshine" in the Top 7 round was acclaimed by judge Simon Cowell, who compared her to the band Sade and admitted having a small crush on her.

On August 7, 2002, the day after her Top 6 performance of "The Glory of Love", Cewe suffered a collapse backstage as she was preparing for the results show and was hospitalized. The collapse was reported as being due to stress by American Idol co-executive producer Nigel Lythgoe, though Cewe denied this in a subsequent interview, stating she had just had a bad headache and felt weak. Cewe was eliminated the night of her hospitalization, receiving the fewest votes of the remaining contestants, and placed sixth. She made a full recovery. Cewe's elimination prompted conspiracy theories among some fans who believed she had not in fact received the lowest number of votes and had been eliminated by producers. Journalist Richard Rushfield, in his book American Idol: The Untold Story, called her exit the series' "very first flurry of conspiracy talk".

=== Performances ===
Episode	Theme	Song choice	Result
Audition	Contestant's Choice	"Isn't She Lovely"	Advanced
Top 30	Contestant's Choice	"At Last"	Advanced
Top 10	Motown	"Ain't No Mountain High Enough"	Safe
Top 8	1960s	"When a Man Loves a Woman"	Safe
Top 7	1970s	"Ain't No Sunshine"	Safe
Top 6	Big Band	"The Glory of Love"	Eliminated

== Later life ==
After American Idol, Cewe received offers from several major record labels, as well as some television opportunities. She was signed to 19 Entertainment alongside the other top 10 finishers and participated with them in the American Idols Live! Tour 2002, as well as the American Idol: Greatest Moments CD. In 2003, she was a presenter for TV Guide covering the second season of American Idol and contributed to the American Idol: The Great Holiday Classics compilation album. In 2004, it was reported by the Associated Press that Cewe would release an album in Europe that summer. Cewe returned that year to the third season of American Idol to give a guest performance of her new single, "Forever or Never."

A 2005 article in The Miami Herald noted Cewe as hoping to produce an album of songs that she had written, but that she was also aiming to finish her sociology degree and go to law school, and that she had appeared on an episode of CSI: Crime Scene Investigation. She ultimately put singing professionally on hold, and as of 2012 had become an account manager for an IT company.

In 2022, Cewe released a children's book titled I Believe in Me: Do You Believe in You?.

Cewe was the first of the American Idol first season finalists to get married, which was in 2004 to Nicholas Cewe, her fiancée at the time of the show. The pair have three children together.
