= American Idol season 1 =

American Idol
- Season 1
- Hosted by: Ryan Seacrest; Brian Dunkleman
- Judges: Paula Abdul; Simon Cowell; Randy Jackson
- Winner: Kelly Clarkson
- Runner-up: Justin Guarini
- Finals venue: Kodak Theatre

Release
- Original network: Fox
- Original release: June 11 – September 4, 2002

Season chronology
- Next → Season 2

The first season of American Idol (originally entitled American Idol: The Search for a Superstar) premiered on June 11, 2002, over four months after Pop Idol's first series ended, with Will Young winning the series, and continued until September 4, 2002. The first season was hosted by Ryan Seacrest and Brian Dunkleman, and the only season to feature Dunkleman in the show and left after the season ended. Paula Abdul, Simon Cowell, and Randy Jackson served as judges. Kelly Clarkson won the competition, defeating Justin Guarini, who runner-up.

Kelly Clarkson signed with RCA Records, the label in partnership with American Idol's 19 Recordings. Immediately after the finale, Clarkson released two singles, including her coronation song, "A Moment Like This," which went on to break a thirty-eight-year-old record held by The Beatles for a song's biggest leap to number one on the Billboard Hot 100. It jumped up from number fifty-two to number one in just one week. Clarkson has enjoyed a successful recording and talk show hosting career since winning, with multiple platinum albums, numerous top-ten hit singles, three Grammy Awards, and eight Emmy Awards. Runner-up Justin Guarini also signed with RCA Records, eventually debuting an album in 2003 after the conclusion of the second season. In addition to Clarkson and Guarini, Nikki McKibbin, Tamyra Gray, R. J. Helton, and Christina Christian also signed recording contracts.

After the finale, a special show in Las Vegas was also shown on September 23, 2002, where all 30 of the contestants who made the judges' initial cut performed in a two-hour concert.

== Regional auditions ==
Auditions were held in New York City, Los Angeles, Chicago, Dallas, Miami, Atlanta, and Seattle in the spring of 2002, and around 10,000 attended the auditions. Auditions were shown in the episode which aired originally on June 11, 2002.

American Idol (season 1) – regional auditions
| City | Date(s) | Venue(s) | Golden tickets |
|---|---|---|---|
| Los Angeles, California | April 20–22, 2002 | Westin Bonaventure Hotel | 31 |
| Seattle, Washington | April 23–25, 2002 | Hyatt Regency Hotel | 10 |
| Chicago, Illinois | April 26–28, 2002 | Congress Plaza Hotel | 23 |
| New York City, New York | April 29 – May 1, 2002 | Millenium Hilton Hotel | 25 |
| Atlanta, Georgia | May 3–5, 2002 | AmericasMart & Callanwolde Fine Arts Center | 15 |
| Dallas, Texas | May 5–7, 2002 | Wyndham Anatole Hotel | 11 |
| Miami, Florida | May 11, 2002 | Fontainebleau Hilton | 6 |
| Total number of tickets to Hollywood | | | 121 |

Kelly Clarkson was notable for being largely absent in the audition episode, and she remains the only winner whose audition was not aired in the original broadcast. The other top ten contestants whose auditions were not shown were Nikki McKibbin and EJay Day.

=== Structure of auditions ===
There were usually three stages in the audition process every season. The first stage was the advertised open call audition, where those auditioning each sing briefly in groups of five in front of selectors, though some may be asked to sing further. Most of those who attended are eliminated at this stage with only a limited number of auditions selected to proceed further. In the second round, they sing in front the executive producers and more are eliminated. In the last round, those who survived the first two stages are invited to sing in front of the judges, and this is the audition shown on television. Those who receive at least two "yes" votes from the three judges then receive a golden ticket to Hollywood.

In the first season, the second and third stage of the audition may take place within a single day, but in the following seasons each stage of the audition may take place on separate days. The initial audition venue may not necessarily be the final audition venue in front of the judges, and in later seasons, up to three separate venues may be used for the auditions in each city. In the early seasons, the entire audition process in each city took place within a relatively short span of time, but became progressively extended in later seasons such that the callback date may be many weeks after the initial auditions.

== Hollywood week ==
The Hollywood week rounds were held in the Pasadena Civic Center, where 121 contestants competed for a place in the live shows. The contestants first came onto the stage in groups of nine or ten, but performed solo unaccompanied, and those who did not impress the judges were cut after the group finished their individual performances. The 65 contestants who were selected to proceed on to the next round were then separated by gender and given a crash course to learn their next song overnight, which they were expected to perform the next day in small groups. The women's song was Dionne Warwick's "I Say a Little Prayer" and the men's song was Stevie Wonder's "For Once in My Life". Again, those who failed to impress were cut immediately after their performance.

In the final round, the top 45 contestants were given new songs to learn and each performed solo and a cappella. The top 15 were first announced, and then the judges selected 15 more out of the top 30.

Delano Cagnolatti was initially amongst those announced as the Top 30, but he was later disqualified for falsifying his age, and became the first person to be disqualified on American Idol. He was replaced by EJay Day.

== Top 30 ==
These 30 contestants reached the top 30 stage of the season. Before their performances, contestants took part in intensive music workshops, where they were given vocal coaching by Debra Byrd and advice by stylists. The contestants each emerged to perform solo with piano accompaniment. There was no studio audience at this stage and the performances were pre-taped. The audiences voted after each round of performances, and the results of the votes were announced the next day. A total of 3.3 million votes were cast in the first week of voting. From each group, three contestants advanced to the next round based on votes by the viewers.

Color key:

This contestant was chosen by the public to advance.
This contestant was not chosen by the public, and had to perform again for the judges.
This contestant was not chosen by the public, but was chosen by the judges as a Wild Card pick.
This contestant was eliminated.

Contestants are listed in the order they performed.

=== Group 1 (June 19) ===
| Contestant | Song | Result |
|---|---|---|
| Tamyra Gray | "And I Am Telling You I'm Not Going" | Safe (1st) |
| Jim Verraros | "When I Fall in Love" | Safe (3rd) |
| Adriel Herrera | "I'll Be" | Eliminated |
| Rodesia Eaves | "Daydream Believer" | Eliminated |
| Natalie Burge | "Crazy" | Eliminated |
| Brad Estrin | "Just Once" | Eliminated |
| Ryan Starr | "The Frim-Fram Sauce" | Safe (2nd) |
| Justinn Waddell | "When a Man Loves a Woman" | Eliminated |
| Kelli Glover | "I Will Always Love You" | Wild Card |
| Christopher Aaron | "Still in Love" | Wild Card |

=== Group 2 (June 26) ===
| Contestant | Song | Result |
|---|---|---|
| Alexis Lopez | "I Will Survive" | Wild Card |
| Gil Sinuet | "Ribbon in the Sky" | Eliminated |
| Angela Peel | "Run to You" | Wild Card |
| AJ Gil | "All or Nothing" | Safe (3rd) |
| Tenia Taylor | "The Greatest Love of All" | Eliminated |
| Alexandra Bachelier | "Save the Best for Last" | Eliminated |
| Jazmin Lowery | "You Put a Move on My Heart" | Eliminated |
| Jamar | "Careless Whisper" | Eliminated |
| Kelly Clarkson | "Respect" | Safe (2nd) |
| Justin Guarini | "Ribbon in the Sky" | Safe (1st) |

=== Group 3 (July 3) ===
| Contestant | Song | Result |
|---|---|---|
| R. J. Helton | "I'll Be There" | Wild Card |
| Kristin Holt | "Fallin'" | Eliminated |
| Mark Scott | "My Girl" | Eliminated |
| Nikki McKibbin | "Total Eclipse of the Heart" | Safe (2nd) |
| Chris Badano | "I Swear" | Eliminated |
| Melanie Sanders | "And I Am Telling You I'm Not Going" | Eliminated |
| EJay Day | "I'll Be" | Safe (3rd) |
| Tanesha Ross | "Until You Come Back to Me (That's What I'm Gonna Do)" | Eliminated |
| Khaleef Chiles | "My Cherie Amour" | Eliminated |
| Christina Christian | "At Last" | Safe (1st) |

=== Wild Card round (July 10) ===
Five of the top 21 contestants were selected by the judges to compete in the Wild Card round. Following another performance by each Wild Card contender, the judges selected one contestant to advance to the group of ten. Contestants are listed in the order they performed.

| Contestant | Song | Result |
|---|---|---|
| Kelli Glover | "How Am I Supposed to Live Without You" | Eliminated |
| Christopher Aaron | "On Bended Knee" | Eliminated |
| Alexis Lopez | "Saving All My Love for You" | Eliminated |
| R.J. Helton | "Lately" | Saved by the judges |
| Angela Peel | "As We Lay" | Eliminated |

== Top 10 contestants ==
Back – EJay Day, R. J. Helton, AJ Gil Middle – Tamyra Gray, Kelly Clarkson, Ryan Starr Front – Justin Guarini, Nikki McKibbin, Christina Christian, Jim Verraros

- Kelly Clarkson (born April 24, 1982, in Fort Worth, Texas; 20 years old at the time of the show) was from Burleson, Texas, and auditioned in Dallas with Etta James' "At Last" and Madonna's "Express Yourself." She performed Aretha Franklin's "Respect" and Vanessa Williams' "Save the Best for Last" in Hollywood.
- Justin Guarini (born October 28, 1978, in Columbus, Georgia; 23 years old at the time of the show) was from Doylestown, Pennsylvania, and auditioned in New York City with The Jackson 5's version of "Who's Lovin' You." He performed Oleta Adams' version of "Get Here" in Hollywood.
- Nikki McKibbin (born September 28, 1978, in Grand Prairie, Texas; 23 years old at the time of the show) auditioned in Dallas with Gloria Gaynor's "I Will Survive" and Whitney Houston's "One Moment in Time." She performed The Righteous Brothers' "Unchained Melody" in Hollywood.
- Tamyra Gray (born July 26, 1979, in Takoma Park, Maryland; 23 years old at the time of the show) was from Atlanta, Georgia, and auditioned there with Mariah Carey's "Vision of Love." She performed Oleta Adams' "Get Here" in Hollywood.
- R. J. Helton (born May 17, 1981, in Pasadena, Texas; 21 years old at the time of the show) was from Cumming, Georgia, and auditioned in Atlanta with The Jackson 5's "Never Can Say Goodbye."
- Christina Christian (born June 21, 1981, in New York City, New York; 21 years old at the time of the show) auditioned in Miami with Stevie Wonder's "Isn't She Lovely." She performed Diana Ross' "Ain't No Mountain High Enough" in Hollywood.
- Ryan Starr (born November 21, 1982, in Los Angeles, California; 19 years old at the time of the show) auditioned in Los Angeles with Bill Withers' "Lean on Me." She performed Bill Withers' "Ain't No Sunshine" in Hollywood.
- AJ Gil (born July 5, 1984, in San Diego, California; 17 years old at the time of the show) was from Tacoma, Washington, and auditioned in Seattle with "The Star-Spangled Banner."
- Jim Verraros (born February 8, 1983, in Chicago, Illinois; 19 years old at the time of the show) was from Crystal Lake, Illinois, and auditioned in Chicago with Nat King Cole's "When I Fall in Love." He performed Diana Ross' "Ain't No Mountain High Enough" in Hollywood.
- EJay Day (born September 13, 1981, in Lawrenceville, Georgia; 20 years old at the time of the show) did not originally qualify for the semifinals, but was later chosen to replace disqualified contestant Delano Cagnolatti. He auditioned in Atlanta with Oleta Adams' "Get Here."

== Live Shows ==
The live shows were broadcast in front of a live studio audience. The finals lasted for eight weeks, and each contestant performed one or more songs selected from a weekly theme.

The results of public vote were revealed on the results show, which aired the next night. The two or three contestants who received the fewest number of votes were announced. The contestant who received the fewest votes was eliminated from the competition.

This season largely set the pattern for later seasons, such as group performances by the contestants during the result shows, hometown visits for the top three, and performing the songs for the top two that would be released immediately after the finale. In this season, there were no guest mentors aside from Burt Bacharach, who helped the contestants prepare their songs.

Kelly Clarkson was declared the winner over Justin Guarini with Kelly receiving 58% of the 15.5 million votes cast. Over 110 million votes were cast over the course of the entire season.

A television special from Las Vegas, Nevada, starring the top thirty-two contestants aired in September 23, 2002, a thirty-date tour with the top ten followed, as did the box office bomb From Justin to Kelly.

Color key:

This contestant was saved by the public vote.
This contestant was in the bottom two or three, but was saved by the public vote.
This contestant was eliminated.
This contestant won American Idol.
This contestant was the runner-up.

=== Top 10 – Motown (July 16) ===
This week featured a double elimination. Contestants are listed in the order they performed.

| Contestant | Motown song | Result |
|---|---|---|
| Ryan Starr | "If You Really Love Me" | Safe |
| R.J. Helton | "I Can't Help Myself (Sugar Pie Honey Bunch)" | Safe |
| Nikki McKibbin | "Ben" | Bottom three |
| EJay Day | "My Girl" | Eliminated |
| Tamyra Gray | "Touch Me in the Morning" | Safe |
| Justin Guarini | "For Once in My Life" | Safe |
| Jim Verraros | "Easy" | Eliminated |
| Kelly Clarkson | "You're All I Need to Get By" | Safe |
| AJ Gil | "My Cherie Amour" | Safe |
| Christina Christian | "Ain't No Mountain High Enough" | Safe |

=== Top 8 – Music from the 1960s (July 23) ===
Contestants are listed in the order they performed.

| Contestant | Song | Result |
|---|---|---|
| R.J. Helton | "Under the Boardwalk" | Safe |
| Tamyra Gray | "A Fool in Love" | Safe |
| Nikki McKibbin | "Piece of My Heart" | Safe |
| AJ Gil | "How Sweet It Is (To Be Loved by You)" | Eliminated |
| Kelly Clarkson | "(You Make Me Feel Like) A Natural Woman" | Safe |
| Christina Christian | "When a Man Loves a Woman" | Bottom three |
| Justin Guarini | "Sunny" | Safe |
| Ryan Starr | "You Really Got Me" | Bottom two |

Non-competition performance
| Performers | Song |
|---|---|
| Top 8 | "California Dreamin'" |

=== Top 7 – Music from the 1970s (July 30) ===
Contestants are listed in the order they performed.

| Contestant | Song | Result |
|---|---|---|
| Nikki McKibbin | "Heartbreaker" | Bottom three |
| Ryan Starr | "Last Dance" | Eliminated |
| Christina Christian | "Ain't No Sunshine" | Safe |
| Justin Guarini | "Someday We'll All Be Free" | Bottom two |
| Kelly Clarkson | "Don't Play That Song (You Lied)" | Safe |
| R.J. Helton | "Superstition" | Safe |
| Tamyra Gray | "If I Were Your Woman" | Safe |

Non-competition performance
| Performers | Song |
|---|---|
| Top 7 | "Joy to the World" |

=== Top 6 – Big Band (August 6) ===
Contestants are listed in the order they performed.

| Contestant | Big band song | Result |
|---|---|---|
| Tamyra Gray | "Minnie the Moocher" | Safe |
| Justin Guarini | "(Get Your Kicks on) Route 66" | Safe |
| Nikki McKibbin | "Hard Hearted Hannah (The Vamp of Savannah)" | Bottom three |
| Christina Christian | "The Glory of Love" | Eliminated |
| R.J. Helton | "I Won't Dance" | Bottom two |
| Kelly Clarkson | "Stuff Like That There" | Safe |

Non-competition performance
| Performers | Song |
|---|---|
| Top 6 | "Bandstand Boogie" |

=== Top 5 – Burt Bacharach love songs (August 13) ===
Burt Bacharach served as a guest mentor this week. Contestants each performed one song written by Bacharach, and listed in the order they performed.

| Contestant | Burt Bacharach song | Result |
|---|---|---|
| Kelly Clarkson | "Walk On By" | Safe |
| R.J. Helton | "Arthur's Theme (Best That You Can Do)" | Eliminated |
| Tamyra Gray | "A House is Not a Home" | Safe |
| Justin Guarini | "The Look of Love" | Safe |
| Nikki McKibbin | "(There's) Always Something There to Remind Me" | Bottom two |

Non-competition performances
| Performers | Song |
|---|---|
| Top 5 | "That's What Friends Are For" |
| Top 5 | Burt Bacharach medley |

=== Top 4 – Music from the 1980s & 1990s (August 20) ===
Each contestant performed two songs. Contestants are listed in the order they performed.

| Contestant | Order | Songs | Result |
|---|---|---|---|
| Tamyra Gray | 1 | "New Attitude" | Eliminated |
| Tamyra Gray | 5 | "Feel the Fire" | Eliminated |
| Nikki McKibbin | 2 | "Mary Jane" | Bottom two |
| Nikki McKibbin | 6 | "I'm the Only One" | Bottom two |
| Kelly Clarkson | 3 | "It's Raining Men" | Safe |
| Kelly Clarkson | 7 | "I Surrender" | Safe |
| Justin Guarini | 4 | "Get Here" | Safe |
| Justin Guarini | 8 | "P.Y.T. (Pretty Young Thing)" | Safe |

Non-competition performance
| Performers | Song |
|---|---|
| Top 4 | Paula Abdul medley |

=== Top 3 (August 27) ===
Each contestant performed two songs: one chosen by the contestant and a second song chosen by the judges. Contestants are listed in the order they performed.

| Contestant | Order | Songs | Result |
|---|---|---|---|
| Nikki McKibbin | 1 | "Edge of Seventeen" | Eliminated |
| Nikki McKibbin | 4 | "Black Velvet" | Eliminated |
| Justin Guarini | 2 | "Let's Stay Together" | Safe |
| Justin Guarini | 5 | "Don't Let the Sun Go Down on Me" | Safe |
| Kelly Clarkson | 3 | "Think Twice" | Safe |
| Kelly Clarkson | 6 | "Without You" | Safe |

Non-competition performances
| Performers | Song |
|---|---|
| Top 3 | "Love Will Keep Us Together" |
| Nikki McKibbin | "Black Velvet" |
| Justin Guarini | "Let's Stay Together" |
| Kelly Clarkson | "Without You" |

=== Top 2 – Finale (September 3) ===
Each contestant performed three songs. Contestants are listed in the order they performed.

| Contestant | Order | Songs | Result |
|---|---|---|---|
| Justin Guarini | 1 | "Before Your Love" | Runner-up |
| Justin Guarini | 3 | "Get Here" | Runner-up |
| Justin Guarini | 5 | "A Moment Like This" | Runner-up |
| Kelly Clarkson | 2 | "A Moment Like This" | Winner |
| Kelly Clarkson | 4 | "Respect" | Winner |
| Kelly Clarkson | 6 | "Before Your Love" | Winner |

Non-competition performances
| Performers | Song |
|---|---|
| Top 10 | Medley: "The Shoop Shoop Song" "California Girls" "These Boots Are Made for Walkin'" "A Fool in Love" "Piece of My Heart" "How Sweet It Is (To Be Loved by You)" "The Look of Love" "Don't Make Me Over" "Unchained Melody" "Under the Boardwalk" "(You Make Me Feel Like) A Natural Woman" "Happy Together" |
| Justin Guarini | "A Moment Like This" |
| Kelly Clarkson | "Before Your Love" |
| Top 10 with Will Young | Medley: "Dancing in the Street" "Get Ready" "If You Really Love Me" "I Can't Help Myself (Sugar Pie Honey Bunch)" "I'll Be There" "You Are the Sunshine of My Life" "You're All I Need to Get By" "My Cherie Amour" "My Guy" "My Girl" "With You I'm Born Again" "Ain't No Mountain High Enough" |
| Kelly Clarkson & Justin Guarini | "It Takes Two" |
| Kelly Clarkson | "A Moment Like This" |

== Elimination chart ==
Color key:

Winner
Runner-up
Saved by the public
Saved by the judges
Wild Card
Bottom two or three
Did not perform
Eliminated

American Idol (season 1) - Eliminations
| Contestant | Pl. | Top 32 | | | Wild Card | Top 10 | Top 8 | Top 7 | Top 6 | Top 5 | Top 4 | Top 3 | Finale |
| Contestant | Pl. | 6/19 | 6/26 | 7/3 | 7/10 | 7/17 | 7/24 | 7/31 | 8/7 | 8/14 | 8/21 | 8/28 | 9/4 |
|---|---|---|---|---|---|---|---|---|---|---|---|---|---|
| Kelly Clarkson | 1 | N/A | Safe (2nd) | N/A | N/A | Safe | Safe | Safe | Safe | Safe | Safe | Safe | Winner |
| Justin Guarini | 2 | N/A | Safe (1st) | N/A | N/A | Safe | Safe | Bottom two | Safe | Safe | Safe | Safe | Runner-up |
| Nikki McKibbin | 3 | N/A | N/A | Safe (2nd) | N/A | Bottom three | Safe | Bottom three | Bottom three | Bottom two | Bottom two | Eliminated | |
| Tamyra Gray | 4 | Safe (1st) | N/A | N/A | N/A | Safe | Safe | Safe | Safe | Safe | Eliminated | | |
| R. J. Helton | 5 | N/A | N/A | Wild Card | Saved | Safe | Safe | Safe | Bottom two | Eliminated | | | |
| Christina Christian | 6 | N/A | N/A | Safe (1st) | N/A | Safe | Bottom three | Safe | Eliminated | | | | |
| Ryan Starr | 7 | Safe (2nd) | N/A | N/A | N/A | Safe | Bottom two | Eliminated | | | | | |
| AJ Gil | 8 | N/A | Safe (3rd) | N/A | N/A | Safe | Eliminated | | | | | | |
| Jim Verraros | 9 | Safe (3rd) | N/A | N/A | N/A | Eliminated | | | | | | | |
| EJay Day | 9 | N/A | N/A | Safe (3rd) | N/A | Eliminated | | | | | | | |
| Christopher Aaron | | Wild Card | N/A | N/A | Eliminated | | | | | | | | |
| Kelli Glover | | Wild Card | N/A | N/A | Eliminated | | | | | | | | |
| Alexis Lopez | | N/A | Wild Card | N/A | Eliminated | | | | | | | | |
| Angela Peel | | N/A | Wild Card | N/A | Eliminated | | | | | | | | |
| Chris Badano | | N/A | N/A | Eliminated | | | | | | | | | |
| Khaleef Chiles | | N/A | N/A | Eliminated | | | | | | | | | |
| Kristin Holt | | N/A | N/A | Eliminated | | | | | | | | | |
| Melanie Sanders | | N/A | N/A | Eliminated | | | | | | | | | |
| Mark Scott | | N/A | N/A | Eliminated | | | | | | | | | |
| Tanesha Ross | | N/A | N/A | Eliminated | | | | | | | | | |
| Alexandra Bachelier | | N/A | Eliminated | | | | | | | | | | |
| Jamar | | N/A | Eliminated | | | | | | | | | | |
| Jazmin Lowery | | N/A | Eliminated | | | | | | | | | | |
| Gil Sinuet | | N/A | Eliminated | | | | | | | | | | |
| Tenia Taylor | | N/A | Eliminated | | | | | | | | | | |
| Natalie Burge | | Eliminated | | | | | | | | | | | |
| Rodesia Eaves | | Eliminated | | | | | | | | | | | |
| Brad Estrin | | Eliminated | | | | | | | | | | | |
| Adriel Herrera | | Eliminated | | | | | | | | | | | |
| Justinn Waddell | | Eliminated | | | | | | | | | | | |

== Controversies ==
It was revealed during the season that around 100 phone-phreak hackers with power-dialing hardware and software were able to place as many as 10,000 votes a night from a single phone line with the touch of a button. However, FremantleMedia, which produces the show, contended that the hackers had a 'statistically insignificant' effect on the vote. Simon Cowell also insisted that Tamyra Gray's unexpected ouster from the show only strengthened the producers' contention that the voting was fair. Nevertheless, concerns were raised about possible unfairness in the situation of a tight vote. Ken Warwick later said in the fifth season that equipment was put in place afterwards to address this issue, but it allegedly has never detected such a problem since.

Controversy erupted when Kelly Clarkson was invited to sing "The Star-Spangled Banner" in a deal arranged by 19 Entertainment at a special commemoration for the first anniversary of September 11 attacks at Washington's Lincoln Memorial. Some critics suggested that Clarkson's appearance would turn a somber occasion of national mourning into a "giant promotional opportunity". Kelly Clarkson herself considered withdrawing from the commemoration, saying "I think it is a bad idea ... If anybody thinks I'm trying to market anything, well, that's awful." and added "I am not going to do it." She was, however, unable to withdraw from the event.

== US Nielsen ratings ==
Season one of American Idol was a surprise summer hit show of 2002 and had an average viewership of 12.7 million per episode. It was the summer's highest-rated show in the 18/49 demographic.

Episode list

| Show | Episode | Air date | Week rank | Rating/Share | 18-49 rating | Viewers (millions) |
|---|---|---|---|---|---|---|
| 1 | "Auditions" | June 11, 2002 | 12 | 6.1 / 11 | 4.8 | 9.85 |
| 2 | "Hollywood Week" | June 12, 2002 | 6 | 6.9 / 12 | 5.2 | 11.24 |
| 3 | "Top 30: Group 1" | June 18, 2002 | 6 | 6.2 / 11 | 5.2 | 10.30 |
| 4 | "Top 30: Group 1 results" | June 19, 2002 | 22 | 5.8 / 10 | 4.7 | 9.47 |
| 5 | "Top 30: Group 2" | June 25, 2002 | 11 | 5.5 / 9 | 4.5 | 9.08 |
| 6 | "Top 30: Group 2 results" | June 26, 2002 | 17 | 5.3 / 9 | 4.2 | 8.53 |
| 7 | "Top 30: Group 3" | July 2, 2002 | 7 | 5.9 / 10 | 5.3 | 10.28 |
| 8 | "Top 30: Group 3 results" | July 3, 2002 | 26 | 4.4 / 8 | N/A | 7.5 |
| 9 | "Wild Card Show" | July 10, 2002 | 14 | 5.4 / 9 | 4.1 | 8.97 |
| 10 | "Top 10 Perform" | July 16, 2002 | 6 | 6.0 / 11 | 5.3 | 10.28 |
| 11 | "Top 10 Results" | July 17, 2002 | 12 | 5.5 / 9 | 4.8 | 9.39 |
| 12 | "Top 8 Finalists" | July 23, 2002 | 7 | 6.6 / 11 | 5.5 | 10.77 |
| 13 | "Top 8 Results" | July 24, 2002 | 16 | 5.7 / 10 | 4.4 | 9.13 |
| 14 | "Top 7 Finalists" | July 30, 2002 | 5 | 7.1 / 12 | 6.3 | 12.20 |
| 15 | "Top 7 Results" | July 31, 2002 | 10 | 6.2 / 10 | 5.0 | 10.20 |
| 16 | "Top 6 Finalists" | August 6, 2002 | 4 | 7.0 / 12 | 6.2 | 12.20 |
| 17 | "Top 6 Results" | August 7, 2002 | 8 | 6.4 / 11 | 5.2 | 10.82 |
| 18 | "Top 5 Finalists" | August 13, 2002 | 3 | 7.4 / 12 | 6.2 | 12.67 |
| 19 | "Top 5 Results" | August 14, 2002 | 4 | 6.9 / 11 | 5.7 | 12.05 |
| 20 | "Top 4 Finalists" | August 20, 2002 | 1 | 8.8 / 14 | 7.9 | 15.29 |
| 21 | "Top 4 Results" | August 21, 2002 | 2 | 8.0 / 13 | 7.1 | 14.10 |
| 22 | "Top 3 Finalists" | August 27, 2002 | 2 | 8.7 / 14 | 7.5 | 14.98 |
| 23 | "Top 3 Results" | August 28, 2002 | 1 | 9.7 / 16 | 8.3 | 16.94 |
| 24 | "Top 2 Finalists" | September 3, 2002 | 2 | 10.5 / 16 | 9.3 | 18.69 |
| 25 | "Season 1 Finale" | September 4, 2002 | 1 | 12.6 / 21 | 10.7 | 22.77 |

== American Idol Rewind ==
Re-edited episodes of American Idol season 1 were being shown in syndication as American Idol Rewind. The new episodes featured commentary from some of the first season's top 30, including Justin Guarini, Jim Verraros, Christina Christian, Nikki McKibbin, Angela Peel, and Kelli Glover. Rewind also showcased footage that was not seen in the initial run of season 1, including Kelly Clarkson's full initial audition.

== Releases ==
=== Compilations ===
- American Idol: Greatest Moments (Album, 2002)
- American Idol: The Great Holiday Classics (feat. Kelly Clarkson, Justin Guarini, Tamyra Gray, Christina Christian - Album, 2003)
- Christmas in a Fishbowl (feat. Nikki McKibbin, Brad Estrin - Album, 2004)
- Voyces United for UNHCR (feat. Alexandria Bachelier, Brad Estrin – Album, 2006)
- American Christmas (feat. Nikki McKibbin, RJ Helton, Alexis Lopez - Album, 2008)
- American Christmas 2 (feat. Nikki McKibbin, RJ Helton, Alexis Lopez - Album, 2010)

== Tour ==
- American Idols Live! Tour 2002
