= Brian Dunkleman =

Comedian, actor, television personality

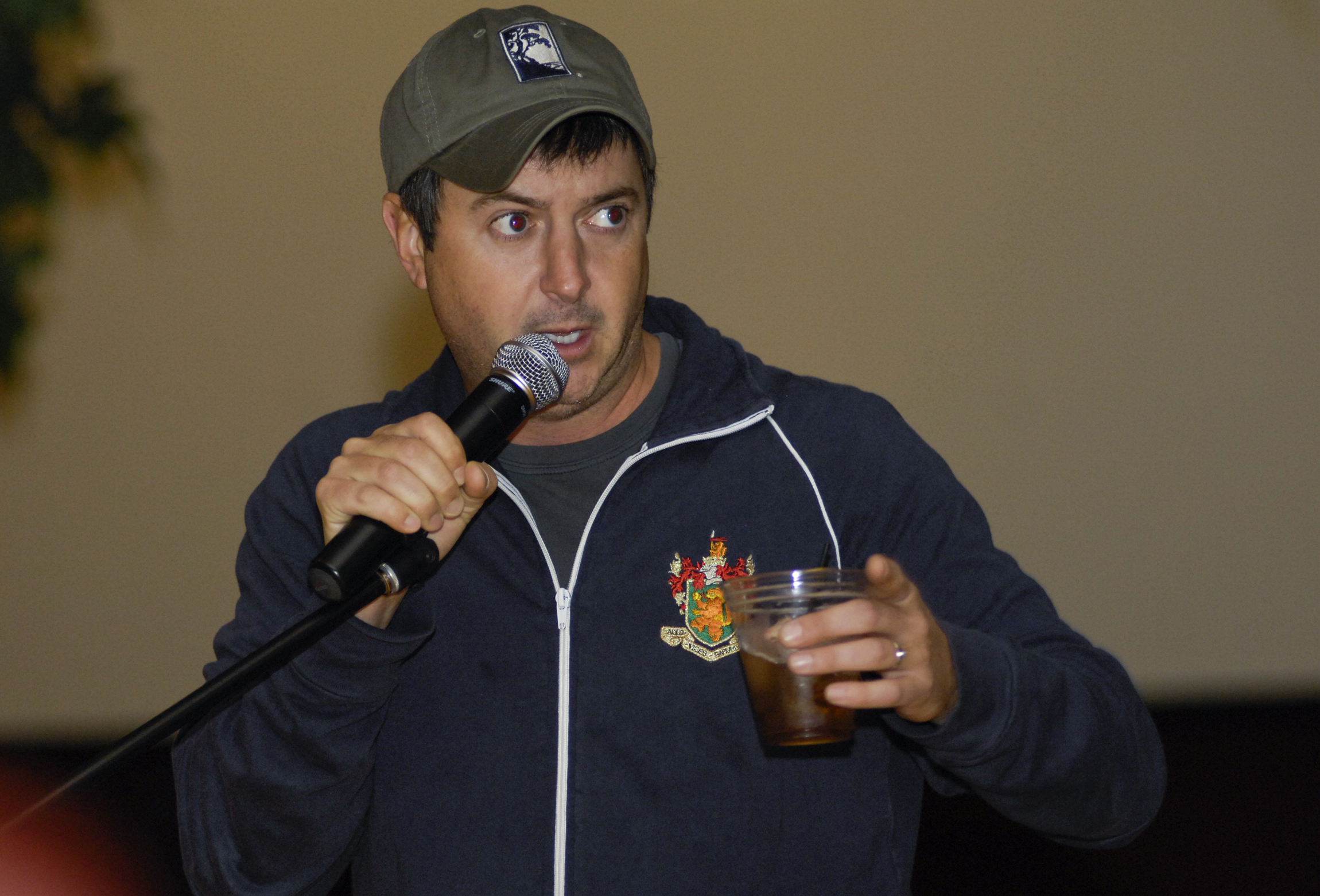
- Dunkleman in 2009
- Born: Brian James Dunkleman; September 25, 1971 (age 54); Ellicottville, New York, U.S.
- Occupations: Comedian; actor; television personality

Brian James Dunkleman (born September 25, 1971) is an American comedian, actor, and television personality. He is best known as being co-host with Ryan Seacrest on the first season of American Idol, in 2002.

== Career ==
=== American Idol ===
In 2002, Dunkleman appeared as the co-host with Ryan Seacrest during the first season of American Idol. After the season ended, it was reported that Dunkleman had quit from co-hosting. Various news outlets later on said that he "had his career completely destroyed" for doing so, before it became enormously popular and made Seacrest very wealthy. However, one journalist believes that Dunkleman would have been fired had he not quit earlier, a fact numerous Idol staffers would eventually admit: Dunkleman had submitted his resignation shortly before news of his firing could reach him.

During his 2008 appearance on the sixth season of the reality television weight loss show Celebrity Fit Club on which he lost 15 pounds, and won the grand prize with his team, he spoke about his reasons for leaving American Idol following its first season. He stated his departure was due to the terrible way they treated the young contestants on the show, staging the fights between the judges and reshooting contestants with producer-provided glycerin tears in their eyes. He went on to say that leaving the show was a mistake. However, Ian K. Smith, one of the doctors on the panel, opined that he made the right decision.

In appearances on The Howard Stern Show, he had insisted that he intended to leave Idol to pursue a career in stand-up comedy and acting, but in 2008, Dunkleman admitted to Stern that he believed leaving the show was a mistake. Dunkleman conceded that he experienced several months of depression, and also still harbored resentment against current show host Ryan Seacrest, but has come to terms with his situation. Stern has compared Dunkleman to Pete Best of the Beatles and several other famous celebrities who chose to leave (or were forced to leave) successful show business careers, only to wind up as has-beens. In 2016, Dunkleman backtracked and said that the mutual decision to part ways was not a mistake on his part.

On April 7, 2016, Dunkleman appeared on the American Idol fifteenth season and (initial) series finale. In an interview following the show, Dunkleman said "I think I beat them to the punch and I didn't know. I left the show but from what I gather, they weren't going to have me back anyway. So it's kind of a big load off my shoulders. I guess I didn't make a mistake. I didn't do a good enough job and I don't think I handled myself as professionally as I needed to back then."

=== Other work ===
In 2000, Dunkleman appeared in "The One with the Ring", a sixth season episode of Friends, as the man who buys the engagement ring Chandler wants to buy Monica.

Dunkleman has also appeared in pilots for ABC and 20th Century Fox and guest-starred on the late-night talk show Talkshow with Spike Feresten, Ghost Whisperer and Las Vegas. He had a recurring guest role on Two Guys and a Girl, played a stand-up comic suspected of murder in NYPD Blue, and appeared in an independent film called Comedy Hell.

His voice acting includes voicing himself in an episode of The Proud Family, in which the show parodied American Idol, did voices for the short-lived animated sitcom 3-South, and playing Ruiga in the English dub of the Japanese anime series Naruto.

Dunkleman was a co-host with Eric the Actor on The Idol Re-cap Show on Sirius's Howard 101. He also did voice over for the 1st season of American Idol Rewind.

Dunkleman played himself on an episode of My Name Is Earl, hosting a reality contest show called Estrada or Nada, in which contestants show their skills in an America's Got Talent-esque show starring Erik Estrada. As Dunkleman ended a segment of the show he said, "Dunkleman... out. Hack stole it from me."

Dunkleman was also parodied in the series finale of Drawn Together. In the episode, he was shown as an out of work and pretentious alcoholic and his inner dialogue expresses contempt of Seacrest's last name, success and charisma. According to the on-screen captions, he "declined to voice himself".

In 2009, Dunkleman pitched a TV series about his life after American Idol entitled American Dunkleman. The series is a fictional account of the actor-comic's life, following the fictional Dunkleman as he tries to work his way back to the television industry, embarrassing himself and disappointing his friends while constantly being reminded that he "could have been a millionaire" had he stuck with Idol.

He does stand up regularly in Los Angeles at the Laugh Factory and The Improv, and he makes regular appearances as the host of Family Feud Live in Las Vegas and Atlantic City for Fremantle(Media).

In November 2019, Dunkleman was on the third episode of Season 1 of the CNBC series Back in the Game, hosted by Alex Rodriguez.

In September 2021, Dunkleman started his own podcast called Dunklevision. His first guest was Justin Guarini.

== Personal life ==
After a brief return to his hometown of Ellicottville, New York, in 2016, Dunkleman currently resides in Los Angeles. He is divorced and has one son.
