= Scott Alan =

American songwriter

- Occupation: Songwriter
- Website: scottalan.net

Scott Alan is an American songwriter who has released eight albums, beginning with his debut album, Dreaming Wide Awake (2007).

== Discography ==
- Dreaming Wide Awake
- Keys
- What I Wanna Be When I Grow Up
- LIVE
- Anything Worth Holding on To
- Greatest Hits: Volume One
- Cynthia Erivo and Oliver Tompsett Sing Scott Alan [Deluxe Edition]
- Lifeline
