= Nikki McKibbin =

American musician (1978–2020)

- Born: Katherine Nicole McKibbin; September 28, 1978; Grand Prairie, Texas, U.S.
- Died: November 1, 2020 (aged 42) Arlington, Texas, U.S.
- Genres: Rock
- Occupation: Singer-songwriter
- Years active: 2002–2020
- Labels: Down Boys, Chenoa, Astral, RCA
- Formerly of: Love Stricken Demise, Rivethead, Downside

Katherine Nicole McKibbin (September 28, 1978 – November 1, 2020) was an American rock music singer-songwriter who finished third in the debut season of the reality television series American Idol. Before American Idol, McKibbin appeared in the first season of Popstars. In May 2007, she released a rock album called Unleashed.

== American Idol ==
In 2002, McKibbin appeared on the first season of American Idol, placing third. McKibbin was in the bottom three every week except one, a total of six times (including elimination).

Songs performed by Nikki McKibbin for American Idol
Round	Song choice	Original artist	Theme	Result
Audition	"I Will Survive"; "One Moment in Time"	Gloria Gaynor; Whitney Houston	N/A	Advanced
Pasadena audition	"Unchained Melody"	The Righteous Brothers	N/A	Advanced
Semi-final	"Total Eclipse of the Heart"	Bonnie Tyler	N/A	Advanced
Top 10	"Ben"	Michael Jackson	Motown	Bottom 3
Top 8	"Piece of My Heart"	Janis Joplin	The 1960s	Safe
Top 7	"Heartbreaker"	Pat Benatar	The 1970s	Bottom 3
Top 6	"Hard Hearted Hannah (The Vamp of Savannah)"	Ella Fitzgerald	Big Band	Bottom 3
Top 5	"(There's) Always Something There to Remind Me"	Lou Johnson	Burt Bacharach	Bottom 2
Top 4	"Mary Jane"; "I'm the Only One"	Alanis Morissette; Melissa Etheridge	The 1980s; The 1990s	Bottom 2
Top 3	"Black Velvet"; "Edge of Seventeen"	Alannah Myles; Stevie Nicks	Judges' Choice	Eliminated

== Post-Idol career ==
Immediately following her stint on American Idol, McKibbin signed with 19 Management and RCA Records. They urged her to record a country album, but she was determined to stay true to her rock roots; she rejected the idea, saying she felt she would be "selling out." The creative differences resulted in no releasable recordings being produced.

McKibbin ran Angelfire Productions, a karaoke company, but after Idol, "got out of the karaoke business" to focus on her music career.

In 2004, she appeared on the holiday CD Christmas in a Fishbowl with several other reality stars for Fishbowl.com.

In May 2005, McKibbin joined Dallas rock band Downside. They did several shows together including a sold-out show at the Hard Rock Cafe in Dallas, but McKibbin left the band in September of the same year due to creative and personal differences.

In 2005, McKibbin appeared in several reality shows, including a "Reality TV Stars" episode of Fear Factor, and the sports competition show Battle of the Network Reality Stars, in which her team won. She also appeared in the E! Entertainment reality show Kill Reality, which documented the filming of The Scorned, a television movie featuring a cast of people who had been on reality television shows; McKibbin played a singer in the film.

Later in 2005, it was announced that she was signed to Australian indie label Astral Records, with her rock-influenced album originally intended to be released in February 2006. Recording began in December 2005, starting with a cover version of "To Be with You" by Mr. Big. A single of "The Lie"/"To Be with You" and a limited edition behind-the-scenes DVD was made available through her official website.

McKibbin's debut album Unleashed came out May 22, 2007. For the promotional 2007 tour, McKibbin worked with Texas heavy metal band Rivethead.

Late in 2007, McKibbin recorded two Christmas songs for the album American Christmas. One was a cover of "All I Want for Christmas Is You" by Vince Vance & the Valiants and the other was an original, "Alone with the Christmas Lights".

In 2008, McKibbin appeared on the second season of the VH1 reality show Celebrity Rehab with Dr. Drew, in which she received treatment for cocaine and alcohol addiction at the Pasadena Recovery Center (PRC). While receiving a physical examination from Dr. Drew Pinsky in the season's first episode, she revealed that she was sexually, physically and emotionally abused as a child. On top of that, she also lost her mother to addiction the previous year. Pinsky noticed signs of hepatomegaly during the examination, most likely caused by her alcoholism. She said that she was on prescription ziprasidone and dextro-methamphetamine to reduce her anxiety, but Pinsky told her that it was unwise for a serious addict to be on such powerful medications. Her withdrawal was painful, and the day after she was taken off her medications she experienced the lethargy of withdrawal syndrome.

After McKibbin completed the program at the PRC, she moved into a sober living environment, which was filmed for the Celebrity Rehab spinoff Sober House. During a group night out for McKibbin and her fellow sober living housemates, which fell on the anniversary of her mother's death the previous year, she gave her first-ever performance while sober, singing her song "Inconsolable".

McKibbin later appeared in the fifth episode of Celebrity Rehab's fifth season, during which she marked three years of sobriety, and performed for that season's cast.

In 2011, McKibbin formed a new band called Love Stricken Demise. The band released an EP in 2012 called Psychotrip which included their single "Celebrity High".

In 2014, McKibbin was seen accompanying her son Tristan on the thirteenth season of American Idol during his audition, where he made it to Hollywood, but was ultimately cut before the live shows.

McKibbin used to give vocal and performance lessons for children in Fort Worth, Texas.

== Personal life ==
McKibbin was born in Grand Prairie, Texas. She was married to Craig Sadler. She had a son, Tristen Cole Langley, (b. December 20, 1997), from a previous relationship. Her husband, Craig, appeared with her on Celebrity Rehab with Dr. Drew.

McKibbin marked a year of sobriety on June 10, 2009.

== Death ==
On November 1, 2020, McKibbin was taken off life support after suffering a brain aneurysm on October 28. She is the fourth American Idol finalist to die after Michael Johns in 2014, Rickey Smith in 2016, and Leah LaBelle in 2018.

== Discography ==
=== Unleashed ===
Unleashed track listing
No.	Title	Length
1.	"The Lie"	3:51
2.	"Cry Little Sister"	3:22
3.	"Electrik"	3:32
4.	"Naked Inside"	3:20
5.	"If I Was a Boy"	3:27
6.	"Drowning"	3:37
7.	"Sorry"	4:16
8.	"Save What's Left of Me"	3:20
9.	"To Be with You"	3:15
10.	"Unleashed"	2:53

Unleashed 2020 reissue track listing
No.	Title	Length
1.	"The Lie"	3:51
2.	"Cry Little Sister"	3:18
3.	"Inconsolable"	4:18
4.	"Naked Inside"	3:20
5.	"Save What's Left of Me"	3:23
6.	"Sorry"	4:18
7.	"It Matters to Me"	3:45
8.	"Drowning"	3:29
9.	"If I Was a Boy"	3:29
10.	"To Be with You"	3:17
11.	"Unleashed"	2:52
12.	"Made It" (featuring The League)	4:20

=== Psychotrip ===
Psychotrip track listing
No.	Title	Writer(s)	Length
1.	"Psychotrip"	Billy Blair; Nikki McKibbin	3:43
2.	"Celebrity High"	Blair; McKibbin	3:19
3.	"This Life"	Blair; McKibbin	5:45
4.	"Love and Hate"	Blair; McKibbin	4:05

=== Singles ===
Year	Single	Album/EP
2006	"To Be with You"	Unleashed
2006	"The Lie"	Unleashed
2007	"Electrik"	Unleashed
2008	"Here to There"	Non-album single
2009	"Inconsolable"	Non-album single
2011	"Made It" (with The League)	Non-album single
2011	"Celebrity High" (with Love Stricken Demise)	Psychotrip

=== Compilation appearances ===
Year	Track	Album
2002	"Piece of My Heart"	American Idol: Greatest Moments
2002	"California Dreamin'" (Ensemble)	American Idol: Greatest Moments
2004	"Jingle Bells 2.0"	Christmas in a Fishbowl
2004	"Deck the Halls" (with Toni Ferrari)	Christmas in a Fishbowl
2004	"I Wish You a Merry Christmas" (with JD Adams)	Christmas in a Fishbowl
2004	"O Come, All Ye Faithful"	Christmas in a Fishbowl
2008	"Alone with the Christmas Lights"	American Christmas
2010	"All I Want for Christmas Is You"	American Christmas 2
2010	"To Be with You"	I Saw You On TV - Reality TV Stars, Vol. 1

=== Music videos ===
Year	Video
2006	"The Lie"
2011	"Celebrity High"
