= Ryan Starr =

American actor-singer (born 1982)

- Born: Tiffany Montgomery; November 21, 1982 (age 43); Los Angeles, California
- Genres: Alternative rock
- Years active: 2002–present
- Labels: RCA Records (2002–2004); Nightbird Records
- Website: www.sheisryan.co

Tiffany Montgomery (born November 21, 1982), known professionally as Ryan Starr, is a singer who finished seventh on the first season of American Idol. She went on to release a successful single on iTunes and participated in a handful of other television programs, modeling campaigns, and worldwide music tours.

== Early life ==
Ryan Starr was born Tiffany Montgomery in the Sunland neighborhood of Los Angeles, California, a place which she once described as a "middle of nowhere town, up in the hills - like, horse country." Her elementary, middle, and high schools were all about "a block from one another" in her words, and growing up, Starr considered herself to be "a small-town tomboy". She has three sisters. On her mother's side, she is Peruvian and Bolivian. She also has French and Irish ancestry.

Although Starr was named Homecoming Queen, she reminisced in a 2017 blog post that she was "dorky" and "definitely not one of the popular kids" for most of her time in school. She graduated from Verdugo Hills High School in 2000, where she ran track. Before attempting a music career, she worked as a waitress, lifeguard, swim team coach, and at a clothing store.

Around the age of seven, Starr began learning how to sing. Her family was unable to afford formal vocal training, so as a child, Starr developed her voice by singing along to Disney films. Drawn to jazz and blues artists from a young age, Nat King Cole, Ella Fitzgerald, Billie Holiday, Etta James, Janis Joplin, and Otis Redding were among Starr's first musical influences. As Starr got older, she found inspiration in rock musicians, such as Pat Benatar, Chris Cornell, Steve Perry, and Steven Tyler.

== Career ==
=== American Idol ===
After graduating from high school, Starr went on frequent bus excursions into Hollywood from her nearby hometown, and on one of these, she met a girl who suggested that the two of them audition for American Idol's first season together. Starr's performance of "Lean on Me" (by Bill Withers) was the first successful audition ever shown on the series. In his 2003 autobiography, I Don't Mean to Be Rude, But..., Simon Cowell wrote that Starr was "cripplingly shy" at the audition, but that Paula Abdul "saw some potential for stardom in her, and decided to mentor her."

Starr, who auditioned as Tiffany Montgomery, adopted her stage name by Hollywood Week. Placed into Group 1 for the Top 30 semi-finals, her song choice for that round of an old jazz standard, "The Frim-Fram Sauce", puzzled Cowell and Randy Jackson, although the following night Cowell deemed Starr "a dark horse" and predicted that she could excel in the competition with better singing material. After she was voted through to the Top 10, Starr opened the first round of the finals, singing "If You Really Love Me" by Stevie Wonder; this marked the first live performance in the history of American Idol. Starr was well received by the judges for that performance but was voted off the series two weeks later in seventh place.

The second of Starr's live performances, "You Really Got Me" by The Kinks, was panned by the judges and resulted in a Bottom 2 placement for that week. While Starr's final performance of the competition, "Last Dance" by Donna Summer, was praised by the judges as an improvement over the previous week, it prompted Cowell to reflect on Starr's disparate song choices throughout the competition and express confusion over what kind of artist Starr wanted to be. The judges felt that Starr struggled with aspects of her performances throughout every round of the finals but communicated a shared belief in Starr's potential. Upon Starr's elimination from the competition, Cowell gave Starr an offer to call him anytime for help with pursuing a music career.

==== Performances ====
Week	Theme	Song	Original artist	Result
Auditions	Contestant's Choice	"Lean on Me" "Fallin'"	Bill Withers; Alicia Keys	Advanced
Hollywood	Contestant's Choice	"Ain't No Sunshine"	Bill Withers	Advanced
Semi-Final Group 1	Free Choice	"The Frim-Fram Sauce"	Nat King Cole	Advanced
Top 10	Motown	"If You Really Love Me"	Stevie Wonder	Safe
Top 8	1960s	"You Really Got Me"	The Kinks	Bottom 2
Top 7	1970s	"Last Dance"	Donna Summer	Eliminated
Season finale		"These Boots Are Made for Walkin'"	Nancy Sinatra	

- "These Boots Are Made for Walkin'" Nancy Sinatra, (solo part in Group performance)

=== Post-American Idol music career ===
Starr blamed her stalled music career on a two-year restrictive recording contract with RCA. Under this contract, she refused to record an album claiming producers wanted to turn her into an Avril Lavigne type singer. After an intense three year legal battle she was released from contract in 2005.

Upon release from her contract, Starr went on to host TRL on VH1. In January 2005, People reported that Starr was "shopping a demo record that steers clear of Idol's sugary pop tones" and had "recently released" an iTunes exclusive single, "My Religion", which she co-wrote. According to a 2007 article by the Boston Herald, "My Religion" was released in 2005, though an earlier article by NCBuy.com reported that "My Religion" was released in September 2004. Although it was reported by the Boston Herald in 2008 and by Rolling Stone in 2011 that "My Religion" peaked at #1 on the Billboard Digital Songs chart, Billboard's own records indicate that the song did not actually chart.

== Television appearances ==
Year	Title	Role	Other notes
2002	American Idol	7th place finalist	Went on a nationwide, 32-city tour with all the American Idol finalists.
2002, 2004	Entertainment Tonight	Guest Star	
2002–2005	Access Hollywood		Starr, along with fellow idol R. J. Helton, did numerous interviews with Access Hollywood.
2002–2006	Fox News	Guest Star	
2003	CSI: Crime Scene Investigation	Sophia Renatta	Starr appeared in an episode where she was killed in a diving accident, which looked like murder.
2003	What I Like About You	Pam Wayne	
2003	Good Day Live	Guest Star	
2003	Live with Regis and Kelly	Guest Star	Sang 'Lean on Me.'
2003, 2005	Total Request Live	Guest Star	Interviewed.
2004	The Surreal Life	Housemate	
2004	VH1 Big in 04	Star	Starr presented an award along with Flavor Flav.
2004	On Air with Ryan Seacrest	Guest Star	Starr was interviewed by Ryan Seacrest, host of American Idol.
2004	The Howard Stern Show	Guest Star	
2004	Good Morning America	Guest Star	
2004	The View	Guest Star	
2005	Battle of the Network Reality Stars	Star	
2005	A Rockin' Las Vegas New-Year with Ryan Starr	Host	
2005	2005 Billboard Music Awards	Red carpet	
2005	Extra	Guest Star	
2005	All Star Reality Reunion	Interviewed	
2006	Lingerie Bowl	Star	Starr was a sideline reporter.
2006	The Tyra Banks Show	Guest Star	
2007	The Dr. Keith Ablow Show	Interviewed	

== Filmography ==
Year	Title	Role	Other notes
2004	Ring of Darkness	Stacy	Lead role
2006	Vendetta	Brigitte Douglas	

== Commercials ==
Year	Title	Role	Other notes
2003	Old Navy	Herself	With several other Idols.
2004	Fuse	Herself	Promoting a new rock line-up.
2006	NASCAR	Herself	Promoting her July 15 NASCAR Runway Performance.

== Discography ==
=== Singles ===
Year	Track	Album
2004	"My Religion"	Non-album single

=== Compilation appearances ===
Year	Title	Peak chart positions	Details
Year	Title	US	Details
2002	American Idol: Greatest Moments	4	Credited on the following tracks: "If You Really Love Me" (Solo performance); "California Dreamin'" (Group performance)
2008	Curtain Call: New Songs from Past American Idol Finalists	—	Credited on the following tracks: "My Religion"; "Broken"; "Blue"

=== As featured artist ===
Year	Track	Album
2010	"Chemically" (Sander Kleinenberg featuring Ryan Starr)	5K
2010	"Crazy for You" (Paolo Mojo featuring Ryan Starr)	Non-album single

=== Other songs ===
Year	Track	Details
2006	"Love Gone Bad"	Released through MySpace
2006	"Eyes of a Child"	Released through MySpace
2006	"Stranded"	Released through MySpace
2007	"7am"	Released through MySpace
