= American Idol alumni in film, television and theater =

This page lists only acting roles and other projects undertaken in film, television and theater in the post-Idol career of American Idol contestants. It does not include guest musical performances or interviews on TV shows, or any pre-Idol work. It is also not intended to be a comprehensive list of all acting roles, appearances, awards nominated or won by any particular alum. Where there are multiple entries, only the more significant may be listed. Please see the appropriate links and references for individual alum for such more complete lists.

== Season 1 ==
The first season of American Idol saw its first and only attempt at expanding the Idol franchise into the film industry. The winner Kelly Clarkson and runner-up Justin Guarini played the leads in the musical comedy, From Justin to Kelly, but the film failed both critically and at the box office. There have been no further film ventures with American Idol contestants.

Clarkson has also been a coach on The Voice, voiced characters in three animated movies, and hostile The Kelly Clarkson Show from September 2019, to August 2026. Guarini has starred in several musical productions, including in a non-musical production of Shakespeare's Romeo & Juliet as Paris in 2013. He was the host of Idol Tonight and Idol Wrap on TVGN (TV Guide Network). Tamyra Gray has starred in several musical products including Rent in 2008. Jim Verraros has starred in gay-theme films, while semi-finalist Kristin Holt has begun a career as a TV show host.

Idol Contestant	Film	Television	Theater
Kelly Clarkson (Winner)	From Justin to Kelly (2003) as Kelly Taylor; The Star (2017) as Leah the Horse; UglyDolls (2019) as Moxy; Trolls World Tour (2020) as Delta Dawn	American Dreams (2003–04) as Brenda Lee (season 1-2, 2 episodes); King of the Hill (2004) as herself (season 8, episode 8); Reba (2007) as Kelly (season 6, episode 8); Canadian Idol (2007) guest mentor (top 5 week); Duets (2012) Mentor/Judge; The Crazy Ones (2013) as herself (Pilot); Kelly Clarkson's Cautionary Christmas Music Tale (2013) herself/host; Nashville (2014) as herself (season 2, episode 11); The Voice (2018–2021, 2023, 2026) as coach; The Kelly Clarkson Show (2019–2026) host Winner - Outstanding Entertainment Talk Show Host, Outstanding Talk Show Entertainment (Daytime Emmy); Kelly Clarkson Presents: When Christmas Comes Around... (2021) as herself; American Song Contest (2022) co-host; Songs & Stories with Kelly Clarkson (2025) Host	
Justin Guarini (Runner-up)	From Justin to Kelly (2003) as Justin Bell Nominated Worst Actor (Razzie); Fast Girl (2008) as Darryl K. Sands	Run of the House (2003) as Paul Hanson (1 episode); Idol Tonight and Idol Wrap (2006–2009) Host; Gone Country (2009) Contestant; Sketched Out TV (2009, web series) Performer	Good Vibrations (2004) as Jan; Women on the Verge of a Nervous Breakdown (2010–2011, Broadway) as Carlos; American Idiot (2011, Broadway) as Will; Rent (2011, Regional) as Roger Davis; Chicago (2011, Regional) as Billy Flynn; Ghost Brothers of Darkland County (2012, Regional) as Drake; Romeo and Juliet (2013, Broadway) as Paris; Wicked (2014, Broadway) as Fiyero; Mamma Mia! (2016, Regional) as Sam Carmichael; In Transit (2016, Broadway) as Trent; Once Upon a One More Time (2023, Broadway) as Prince Charming
Nikki McKibbin (3rd place)	The Scorned (2005, television film) as singer	Fear Factor (2005) Contestant; "Battle of the Network Reality Stars (2005) Contestant; Celebrity Rehab with Dr. Drew (2008) as herself; Sober House (2009) as herself	
Tamyra Gray (4th place)	The Gospel (2005) as Rain Walker; Rachel Getting Married (2008) as singing friend	Boston Public (2003) as Aisha Clemens (7 episodes); Tru Calling (2004) as Carly Anders (1 episode); What I Like about You (2004) as Danielle (2 episodes)	Bombay Dreams (2004–2005, Broadway) as Priya; Rent (2007–2008, Broadway) as Mimi Marquez; Twist (2011, Regional) as Della; Once on This Island (2018–2019, Broadway) as Papa Ge
Christina Christian (6th place)	Celia: The Queen (2008, documentary) as young Celia Cruz	CSI: Crime Scene Investigation (2003) as Kenisha Jones (Season 3, Episode 16); Burn Notice (2009) as female bartender	
Ryan Starr (7th place)	Ring of Darkness (2004, television film) as Stacy	What I Like About You (2003) as Pam (2 episodes); CSI: Crime Scene Investigation (2003) as Sophia Renatta (Season 4, Episode 4); The Surreal Life (2004) as herself (12 episodes); Gimme My Reality Show! (2008) Contestant	
Jim Verraros (9th place)	Eating Out (2004) as Kyle; Eating Out 2: Sloppy Seconds (2006) as Kyle; Another Gay Sequel: Gays Gone Wild (2008)		

== Season 2 ==
The winner of season 2, Ruben Studdard, teamed with the fifth-place finisher Trenyce and the disqualified semi-finalist Frenchie Davis to star in the touring production of Ain't Misbehavin', the recording of which won a Grammy nomination. The runner-up Clay Aiken enjoyed two successful stints on Broadway in the musical Spamalot. Davis also had some success on Broadway, as did Hollywood round auditioner Josh Strickland who starred as Tarzan in musical of the same name.

Kimberley Locke and Kimberly Caldwell have both pursued a career as TV hosts aside from their music.

Idol Contestant	Film	Television	Theater
Ruben Studdard (Winner)	Scooby Doo 2: Monsters Unleashed (2004) as himself; Lifted (2010) as Pastor Johnson; The Perfect Gift (2011) as Michael Harris; Stakes (2094) as Ruben (short)	One on One (2004) as himself (Season 3, episode 15); 8 Simple Rules (2005) as Guy (Season 3, episode 20); Life on a Stick (2005) as Bobby (Season 1, episode 3); All of Us (2005) as grown Bobby; Eve (2006) as Paul (Season 3, episode 15); The Biggest Loser (2013) contestant	Ain't Misbehavin' (2008, national tour) as Fats Waller Nominated - Best Musical Show Album (Grammy)
Clay Aiken (Runner-up)	* Sandy Wexler (2017) as New Ugly Duckling	Ed (2004) as himself (Season 4, episode 15); Scrubs (2005) as Kenny (Season 4, episode 17); All My Children (2005) as himself (1 episode); 30 Rock (2009) as himself (Season 3, episode 22); Phineas and Ferb (2010) as himself (voice); Drop Dead Diva (2011) as Tyler Callahan; Celebrity Apprentice (2012) Candidate; The Office (2013) himself (Season 9, episode 22); Law & Order: Special Victims Unit (2013) as himself (Season 15, Episode 7); Sharknado 5: Global Swarming (2017) as Lleweyln (TV movie); New Dogs, Old Tricks (1018) as Nathan (Season 1, episode 6)	Spamalot (2008–2009, Broadway) as Sir Robin; Joseph and the Amazing Technicolor Dreamcoat (2013, regional) as Joseph
Kimberley Locke (3rd place)		Little Talent Show (2006) Host; Gospel Dream (2009) Host; Rick & Steve: The Happiest Gay Couple in All the World (2009) as Steamroom Sally (voice)	
Josh Gracin (4th place)		The Young and the Restless (2006) as Jake	
Trenyce (5th place)	Friends & Lovers: The Ski Trip 2 (2008) as Unique		Dreamgirls (2006, regional) as Deena Jones; Love in the Nick of Tyme (2007, national tour) as Portia; Ain't Misbehavin' (2008, national tour) as Charlaine Nominated - Best Musical Show Album (Grammy); Thriller – Live (2010–2011, London, European tour) Vocalist
Carmen Rasmusen (6th place)	Pride & Prejudice (2003) as Charlotte Lucas; Racing Ace (2005) as Marilyn	Fear Factor (2006) Contestant	
Kimberly Caldwell (7th place)	Wrong Turn 2: Dead End (2007) as Kimberly Caldwell; Deception (2012) as Paige Matthews	Life on a Stick (2005) as Kimberly; Idol Tonight and Idol Wrap (2007–2009) Host; P. Diddy's Starmaker (2009) Host; Rock 'n Roll Fantasy Camp (2011) Host; Franklin & Bash (2012) as Bree (Season 2 episode 9); Best Ink (2012) Host	
Rickey Smith (8th place)			OZ, the Musical (2009, national tour) as Tinman
Corey Clark (9th, disqualified)		Primetime Live (2005) as himself	
Vanessa Olivarez (12th place)			Hairspray (2005, Toronto) as Tracy Turnblad Nominated - Outstanding Performance by a Female in a Principal Role - Musical (Dora Award)
Frenchie Davis (Semi-finalist)	We Are Family (2011) as JoJoDean; Dumbbells (2012)	The Voice (2011) Contestant	Rent (2003–2007, Broadway) as Mrs Jefferson and others; Ain’t Misbehavin' (2008, national) Nominated - Best Musical Show Album (Grammy)

== Season 3 ==
Season 3 winner, Fantasia had a critically and commercially successful stint in musical theater notably starring in The Color Purple. She was in her own TV show for one season and also acted in movies. The runner-up, Diana DeGarmo also found success in musical theater starring in Broadway musicals including Hair and Hairspray.

Seventh-place finisher, Jennifer Hudson, became one of the most successful American Idol contestants when she landed a part in the film adaptation of the musical Dreamgirls, and then won major awards as supporting actress including an Oscar. She has since starred in many major films including Sex and the City and Sing. Eleventh-place finisher, Matthew Rogers has a steady career as a TV show host. Alan Ritchson who was often featured in audition and Hollywood rounds pursued a career as a TV and film actor and auditioner William Hung briefly landed some acting roles due to his exposure on the show.

Idol Contestant	Film	Television	Theater
Fantasia (Winner)	Life Is Not a Fairy Tale (2006, television film) as herself; The Color Purple (2023) as Celie Nominated - Best Actress (Golden Globe, BAFTA)	American Dreams (2004) as Aretha Franklin (Season 2, 1 episode); The Simpsons (2005) as Clarissa Wellington (1 episode); Fantasia for Real (2010–2011) as herself	The Color Purple (2007, Broadway) as Celie Won Theatre World Award for debut theatre performance; After Midnight (2013, Broadway) performer
Diana DeGarmo (Runner-up)	The First Ride of Wyatt Earp (2012) as Dora Hand	The Fairly OddParents (2006) as Cosmo (singing voice); The Young and the Restless (2011–2012) as Angelina; Planet 360 (2013) as co-host	Hairspray (2006–2007, Broadway) as Penny Pingleton; The Toxic Avenger (2009, off-Broadway) as Sarah; Hair (2010, Broadway) as Sheila Franklin; 9 to 5 (2010–2011, National Tour) as Doralee Rhodes; Joseph and the Amazing Technicolor Dreamcoat (2014, regional); The Marvelous Wonderettes (2016, Off-Broadway) as Suzy Simpson; Into the Woods (2023, regional) as the Witch
Jasmine Trias (3rd place)		North Shore (2004) as herself (1 episode); Your Song (2006–2007) as Charry and Joanne (2 episodes)	
LaToya London (4th place)			Issues, We All Got 'Em (2006, national tour) as Chastity; Beehive (2006, regional)) Nominated Ensemble Performance (LADCC Awards; The Color Purple (2007–2010, national tour) as Nettie Nominated Best supporting female - Equity (NAACP Theatre Awards)
Jennifer Hudson (7th place)	Dreamgirls (2006) as Effie White Won Best Supporting Actress (Oscar, Golden Globe, BAFTA, SAG); Sex and the City (2008) as Louise; The Secret Life of Bees (2008) as Rosaleen Daise; Winnie Mandela (2011) as Winnie Mandela; The Three Stooges (2012) as Sister Rosemary; Black Nativity (2013) as Naima Cobbs; Lullaby (2014) as Nurse Carrie; Chi-Raq (2015) as Irene; Sing (2016) as Young Nana Noodleman (voice); Sandy Wexler (2017) as Courtney Clarke; Cats (2019) as Grizabella; Respect (2021) as Aretha Franklin; Goat (2026) as Louise Harris (voice); Paw Patrol: The Dino Movie (2026) as Lilian Ledes (voice)	Jennifer Hudson: I'll Be Home for Christmas (2009) Host; Majors & Minors (2011) Mentor; Smash (2013) as Veronica Moore; Empire (2015) as Michelle White; Confirmation (2016) as Angela Wright; Hairspray Live! (2016) as Motormouth Maybelle; The Voice UK (2016) Mentor/Judge; The Voice (2017) Mentor/Judge; Baba Yaga (2021) Producer Won - Outstanding Interactive Media for a Daytime Program (Daytime Emmy Award); The Jennifer Hudson Show (2022-present) Host Nominated - Outstanding Entertainment Talk Show Host, Outstanding Daytime Talk Series (Daytime Emmy Award)	Hair (2004, Actor Fund concert); The Color Purple (2015–2016, Broadway) as Shug Avery; A Strange Loop (2022, Broadway) Producer Won - Best Musical (Tony Award)
Jon Peter Lewis (8th place)		The Voice (2013) Competitor)	
Amy Adams (10th place)			Joseph and the Amazing Technicolor Dreamcoat (2005, national tour) as the Narrator
Matthew Rogers (11th place)		American Idol Extra (2006–2007) Co-host; Really Big Things (2007–2008) Host; There Goes the Neighborhood (2009) Host; Coming Home (2011) Host	
Matthew Metzger (Semi-finalist)		All My Children (2005) as Duke Buchanan (2 episodes); One Life to Live (2006) as Duke Buchanan (1 episode)	
Katie Webber (Semi-finalist)	Rent (2005) as Dancer		Wicked (2005–2008, Broadway) as Witch's Mother; Rock of Ages (2010–2011, Broadway) as waitress; Catch Me If You Can (2011, Broadway) Ensemble; Tina: The Tina Turner Musical (2022, Broadway) Rhonda
Alan Ritchson (Hollywood rounds)	Steam (2007) as Roy; Spring Break '83 (2011) as Brad; The Hunger Games: Catching Fire (2013) as Gloss; Teenage Mutant Ninja Turtles (2014) as Raphael; Teenage Mutant Ninja Turtles: Out of the Shadows (2016) as Raphael	Smallville (2005–2010) as Aquaman (4 episodes); CSI: Miami (2010) as Paul Arnett (Season 8, episode 19); Blue Mountain State (2010–2011) as Thad Castle (26 episodes); 90210 (2011) as Tripp Willinson; Titans (2018) as Hank Hall / Hawk; Reacher (2022-present) as Jack Reacher	
LaKeta Booker (Hollywood rounds)		Beyond the Gates (2025) Recurring co-star, as Receptioner	
William Hung (Auditioner)	Where's Mama's Boy? (2005) as the godson; Chinaman's Chance (2008) as Ting	George Lopez (2005) as himself (1 episode); Arrested Development (2006) as himself (2 episodes)	

== Season 4 ==
A number of season 4 Idol alumni including Anthony Fedorov have been involved in musical theater, but the most successful is the sixth-place finisher Constantine Maroulis. Maroulis has been active on Broadway and was nominated for a Tony Award for his role in Rock of Ages. The winner Carrie Underwood made her acting debut in a film, starring in Soul Surfer.

Idol Contestant	Film	Television	Theater
Carrie Underwood (Winner)	Soul Surfer (2011) as Sarah Hill	Carrie Underwood: An All-Star Holiday Special (2009) Host; Sesame Street (2010) as Carrie Underworm; How I Met Your Mother (2010) as Tiffany; Extreme Makeover: Home Edition (2011) as herself; The Sound of Music Live! (2013) as Maria von Trapp; American Idol (2025–) as Judge	
Bo Bice (Runner-up)		Rock of Ages (2023, regional)	
Vonzell Solomon (3rd place)	Still Green (2007) as Chelsea		Simply Ballroom (2008, national tour) Vocalist; OZ, the Musical (2009, national tour) as Glinda/Aunt Em; Burn the Floor (2010–2011) Vocalist
Anthony Fedorov (4th place)		Fear Factor (2006) Contestant; Little Talent Show (2006) Judge	The Fantasticks (2007, off-Broadway) as Matt; Joseph and the Amazing Technicolor Dreamcoat (2009–2011, national, Japan) as Joseph; Rent (2012, off-Broadway) as Roger; The Sound of Music (2012, regional) as Rolf
Scott Savol (5th place)			OZ, the Musical (2009, national tour) as Lion; The Lord Will Make A Way (2009–2010, national tour)
Constantine Maroulis (6th place)	Rock of Ages (2012) as Record Executive	Little Talent Show (2006) Host; The Bold and the Beautiful (2007) as Constantine Parros; Teachers (2008) as Constantine Maroulis; American Idol Extra (2008) Co-host; Law & Order (2010) as Fabio Scalia (Season 20, episode 19)	The Wedding Singer (2006, Broadway) as Sammy; Jacques Brel is Alive and Well and Living in Paris (2007, off-Broadway) as young soldier; Rock of Ages (2009–2011, Broadway and national tour) as Drew Bowie Nominated - Best Performance by a Leading Actor in a Musical (Tony); The Toxic Avenger (2012, National) as Melvin/Toxie; Jekyll & Hyde (2012, National, Broadway) as Dr. Henry Jekyll/Edward Hyde; Next to Normal (2024, regional) as Dan Goodman
Anwar Robinson (7th place)	Friends & Lovers: The Ski Trip 2 (2008) as Owen	Friends and Lovers (2010) as Owen	Rent (2007–2008, national tour) as Tom Collins
Nadia Turner (8th place)	Lord Help Us (2007) as Kayla Brooks		
Nikko Smith (9th place)	The Agonist		
Jessica Sierra (10th place)	Jessica Sierra Superstar (2007, adult) as herself	Celebrity Rehab with Dr. Drew (2008–2011) as herself	
Mikalah Gordon (11th place)		The Unit (2005) as Lila Lee (Season 3, 1 episode); The Tyra Banks Show (2006) Correspondent; American Idol Extra (2006–2007) Co-host; Living with Fran (2007) as Brianna; Hollywood 411 (2009- ) Correspondent	OZ, the Musical (2009, national tour) as Dorothy
Melissa Lawson (Hollywood rounds)		Nashville Star (2008) Contestant (Winner, Season 6)	

== Season 5 ==
The season 5 runner-up Katharine McPhee has established a career as a film and TV actress, and starred in the TV series Smash and Scorpion. Eleventh-placed finisher Kevin Covais also has a steady career as an actor with many acting roles in film and TV. Other Season 5 contestants who also pursued an acting career include Lisa Tucker. The winner, Taylor Hicks had enjoyed a stint in theater, while seventh-place finisher Ace Young also had a couple of major acting roles on Broadway.

Idol Contestant	Film	Television	Theater
Taylor Hicks (Winner)		The Choice (2012) Contestant; Law & Order: Special Victims Unit (2013) as himself (Season 15, Episode 7); State Plate (2016–2017) HOST on the INSP Network	Grease (2008–2009, Broadway and national tour) as Teen Angel
Katharine McPhee (Runner-up)	The House Bunny (2008) as Harmony; You May Not Kiss the Bride (2011) as Masha Nikitin; Shark Night 3D (2011) as Karen; The Tiger Rising (2022) as Caroline Horton	CSI: NY (2009) as Dana Melton/Odessa Shaw (Season 5, episode 20); Community (2009) as Amber (Season 1, episode 18); Smash (2012–2013) as Karen Cartwright; Scorpion (2014–2018) as Paige Dineen; The Masked Singer (2021) contestant (season 6); Celebrity Wheel of Fortune (2025) contestant	Waitress (2018–2020, Broadway and West End) as Jenna Hunterson
Elliott Yamin (3rd place)		The Bold and the Beautiful (2007) as himself; Lincoln Heights (2007) as himself (Season 2, episode 3)	
Chris Daughtry (4th place)	Trolland (2016)	CSI: NY (2008) as Machiavelli Taylor (Season 5, episode 8); The Passion (2016) as Judas Iscariot; The Masked Singer (2019) contestant (season 2)	
Paris Bennett (5th place)	Mama, I Want to Sing! (2008) as Elyse		
Kellie Pickler (6th place)		90210 (2011) as Sally; Dancing with the Stars (2013) contestant (winner, season 16); Pickler & Ben (2017–2019) co-host	
Ace Young (7th place)	Section B (2011) as Ryan	Half & Half (2005) as Ace (Season 4, episode 6); Bones (2008) as Tommy Sour (Season 3, episode 14); American Idol Extra (2009) Co-host; Planet 360 (2013) as co-host	Grease (2008–2010) as Kenickie (Broadway), Danny Zuko (National Tour); Hair (2010, Broadway) as Berger; Joseph and the Amazing Technicolor Dreamcoat (2014) as Joseph
Lisa Tucker (10th place)	The Hustle (2008) as Keisha	The O.C. (2006) as herself (Season 3, Episode 23); Zoey 101 (2007–2008) as Pucci (Season 3-4, 5 episodes); The Game (2009) as Lisa Perkins (Season 3, 3 episodes); The Vampire Diaries (2011) as Greta Martin (Season 2, 3 episodes)	
Kevin Covais (11th place)	College (2008) as Morris Hooper; Labor Pains (2009) as Greg; Division III: Football's Finest (2011) as Allen Schwartz; Touchback (2011) as Todd White; Transformers: Age of Extinction (2014) as Dorky Driver	Ghost Whisperer (2009) as P.A. (Season 4, episode 20); The Great State of Georgia (2011) as Lewis; Good Luck Charlie (2012–14) as Victor (8 episodes)	
Ayla Brown (Semi-finalist)		The Early Show (2010) Correspondent	Joseph and the Amazing Technicolor Dreamcoat (2008) as The Narrator
Kinnik Sky (Semi-finalist)		House of Payne (2008) as Nurse Jones; Hard Rock Cafe Presents (2011) Host	
Becky O'Donohue (Semi-finalist)	I Now Pronounce You Chuck & Larry (2007) as Darla; Mardi Gras: Spring Break (2010) as Cousin Janice	Trick It Out (2007) Host; ER (2007) as Sophia (Season 4, episode 20); House (2009) as Karamel (Season 5, episode 22); Psych (2010) as Molly Gogolack (Season 5, episode 3); Minute to Win It (2010) Contestant	
Brianna Taylor (Hollywood rounds)		The Real World (2008) Contestant (Season 18); Real World/Road Rules Challenge (2009) Cast member (Season 12)	
Jes Hudak (Hollywood rounds)		Platinum Hit (2011) Contestant	

== Season 6 ==
The winner, Jordin Sparks has taken roles both in theater and film. She appeared opposite Whitney Houston in the film Sparkle. Semifinalist Jared Cotter has worked as a host in a handful of TV shows.

Idol Contestant	Film	Television	Theater
Jordin Sparks (Winner)	Sparkle as Sparkle Anderson	The Suite Life on Deck (2009) as herself (1 episode); Big Time Rush (2010) as herself (2 episodes); Team Umizoomi (2011) as Blue Mermaid (voice); Majors & Minors (2011) Mentor; The Masked Dancer (2021) Contestant; Roller Jam (2025) Host (6 episodes)	In the Heights (2010, Broadway) as Nina Rosario; Waitress (2019, Broadway) as Jenna Hunterson
Blake Lewis (Runner-up)		Free Radio (2008) as himself (Season 1, episode 4); Durarara!! (2011) as Kasuka Heiwajima (voice)	
LaKisha Jones (4th place)		The Winner Is (2013) Contestant	The Color Purple (2007–2008, Broadway) as Sofia and church soloist
Sanjaya Malakar (7th place)		Idol Stars: Where Are They Now (2008) Host; I'm a Celebrity...Get Me Out of Here! (2009) Contestant; Hell's Kitchen (2010) as himself	Freckleface Strawberry (2011, off-Broadway) as Danny
Gina Glocksen (9th place)		American Idol Extra (2008) Co-host	Ballroom with a Twist (2011, national tour) Vocalist
Chris Sligh (10th place)	October Baby (2011) as bmac		
Brandon Rogers (12th place)	Missing Audrey (2010) as Ben	Bones (2008) as Broadway wanna-be (Season 3, episode 14); Valley Peaks (2009, web TV) as Matt	
Sabrina Sloan (Semi-finalist)		Boston Legal (2007) as Singer #1 (Season 4, episode 10); Up All Night (2012) as Singer #7 (Season 1, episode 24)	Gulls (2008, regional) as Nina; Princess and the Black Eyed Pea (2008, regional) as Princess Quelie; Dreamgirls (2008, regional) as Lorrell Robinson; Rent (2009, regional) as Mimi; In the Heights (2010, Tour) Vanessa; Catch Me If You Can (2011, Broadway) Ensemble; Hamilton (2017, Angelica Tour / 2019 And Peggy Tour) Angelica Schuyler
Jared Cotter (Semi-finalist)		The Sauce (2007–2008) Host; No. 1 Countdown: Pop (2008) Host; You Rock, Let's Roll (2008) Host; The Challenge (2009- ) Host	
Sundance Head (Semi-finalist)		The Voice (2016) Winner	

== Season 7 ==
Idol Contestant	Film	Television	Theater
David Cook (Winner)		Best Week Ever (2008) as himself (2 episodes); Free Radio (2009) as himself (Season 2, episode 2); Extreme Makeover: Home Edition (2010) as himself	Kinky Boots (2018, broadway) as Charlie Price
David Archuleta (Runner-up)		iCarly (2009) as himself; Hannah Montana (2009) as himself; Nandito Ako (2012) as Josh Bradley	
Syesha Mercado (3rd place)	Dreams (2011) as Mia		Dreamgirls (2009–2010, national tour) as Deena Jones; Once on This Island (2012, regional) as Ti Moune; The Book of Mormon (2012–2014, regional and Broadway) as Nabulungi
Jason Castro (4th place)		The Bold and the Beautiful (2010) as himself (2 episodes)	
Brooke White (5th place)	Change of Plans (2011, television film) as Sally Danville; Banner 4 July (2013, television film) as Desiree	Miss America (2010) Judge	
Carly Smithson (6th place)		Hell's Kitchen (2010) as herself	Viva Elvis (2011, Las Vegas) Singer
Kristy Lee Cook (7th place)		Outdoor's 10 Best (2010) Host; Wanted: Adventure Host (2010) Judge; Goin' Country (2011) Host	
Chikezie (10th place)		General Hospital (2009) as K.Z. (1 episode)	Thriller – Live (2011, UK tour) Vocalist
David Hernandez (12th place)			Ballroom with a Twist (2009–2011, national tour) Vocalist; Dancing Queen (2012, regional)
Adore Delano (appeared as Danny Noirega)		RuPaul's Drag Race (2014); RuPaul's Drag All-Stars (2016); Ex on the Beach (2019)	
Colton Swon (Hollywood)		The Voice (2013) Third place (as part of The Swon Brothers)	

== Season 8 ==
Idol Contestant	Film	Television	Theater
Kris Allen (Winner)		Best Week Ever (2009) as himself; Gigantic (2011) as himself	
Adam Lambert (Runner-up)		Majors & Minors (2011) Mentor; Project Runway (2011) Judge; Pretty Little Liars (2012) as himself; Glee (2013) Elliot "StarChild" Gilbert; The Rocky Horror Picture Show Event (2016) Eddie	
Danny Gokey (3rd place)	Truth Be Told (2011) as himself		
Alexis Grace (11th place)			Chicago (2012, regional) as Roxie Hart
Jackie Tohn (Semi-finalist)	Monster of the House (2011, television film) as Jackie	Memphis Beat (2010) as Delilah Boswell (1 episode); For a Green Card (2010–2011) as Jackie; CSI: NY (2011) as Ainsley McCrea (1 episode); Platinum Hit (2011) Contestant; GLOW (2017) as Melrose	
Arianna Afsar (Semi-Finals)	Martian Land (2015) as Miranda		Hamilton (Chicago production, 2016) as Eliza Hamilton (Original cast)
Jamar Rogers (Hollywood rounds)		The Voice (U.S.) (2012) Contestant	
John Twiford (Hollywood rounds)			Jesus Christ Superstar (national tour, 2009–2010) as Judas Iscariot

== Season 9 ==
Idol Contestant	Film	Television	Theater
Lee DeWyze (Winner)		Hell's Kitchen (2012) as himself	
Crystal Bowersox (Runner-up)		Body of Proof (2011) as Zoe Reese	Always…Patsy Cline (2013) as Patsy Cline
Siobhan Magnus (6th place)			The Reluctant Dragon (2013, regional)
Katie Stevens (8th place)		Faking It (2014) as Karma	
Paige Miles (11th place)			Beehive - the 60s Musical (2011)
Alex Lambert (semi-finalist)		If I Can Dream (2010, web series) as himself	
Todrick Hall (Semi-finalist)		The X Factor (2012) as backup singer; Todrick (2015, MTV) as himself; RuPaul's Drag Race (2016) as guest judge; The Masked Singer (2021) contestant (season 6)	Hairspray (2010) as Seaweed; Memphis (2010, Broadway) Ensemble; Kinky Boots (2016) as Lola
Jermaine Sellers (Semi-finalist)	Leave It on the Floor (2011) as Dancer	Sunday Best (2007) Contestant	
John Park (Semi-finalist)		Superstar K2 (2010) Contestant (runner-up)	
Chris Golightly (Semi-finalist)		Superstar K3 (2011) Contestant	
Luke Edgemon (Hollywood rounds)		Glee (2011) as Flint Wilson (Warblers); The Voice (2013) Contestant	
Samuel Larsen (Hollywood rounds)		The Glee Project (2011–2012) Winner (season 1), guest mentor (season 2); Glee (2012) as Joe Hart	
Tori Kelly (Hollywood rounds)	Sing (2016) as Meena	The Masked Singer (2020) contestant (season 4)	

== Season 10 ==
Idol Contestant	Film	Television	Theater
Scotty McCreery (1st place)	Five More Minutes (2021) Writer/executive producer (TV movie); Five More Minutes: Moments Like These (2022) Executive producer (TV movie)	Hart of Dixie (2012) as himself	
Lauren Alaina (2nd place)	The Road Less Traveled (2017) as Charlotte (TV Movie); Roadhouse Romance (2021) as Callie (TV Movie)	Nashville (2017) as herself (1 episode); Dancing with the Stars (2019) contestant (season 28)	
Haley Reinhart (3rd place)		90210 (2011) as herself; Hell's Kitchen (2012) as herself; F Is for Family (2015–2021) Bill Murphy	
James Durbin (4th place)		Different Is The New Normal (2011) as himself; Dr. Drew's Lifechangers (2011) as himself; NY Ink (2012) as himself	
Stefano Langone (7th place)		Dr. Drew's Lifechangers (2011) as himself	
Paul McDonald (8th Place)		Parenthood (2012)	
Pia Toscano (9th Place)		So You Think You Can Dance (2011) as herself	

== Season 11 ==
Idol Contestant	Film	Television	Theater
Phillip Phillips (Winner)		Pure Genius 2016) as self; Hawaii Five-0 (2018) as Voss	
Jessica Sanchez (Runner-up)		Glee (2013) as Frida Romero; America's Got Talent (2025) season 20 winner	
Heejun Han (9th place)		K-pop Star (2013) contestant	

== Season 14 ==
Idol Contestant	Film	Television	Theater
Nick Fradiani (Winner)			A Beautiful Noise (2023, Broadway) as Neil Diamond

== Season 16 ==
Idol Contestant	Film	Television	Theater
Gabby Barrett (3rd place)	Hurry Up Tomorrow (2025) as Isabella		
