= American Idols Live! Tour 2005 =

2005 summer concert tour

- Tour by American Idol
- From top to bottom Anwar Robinson, Scott Savol, Jessica Sierra, Nadia Turner, Anthony Fedorov, Vonzell Solomon, Nikko Smith, Carrie Underwood, Bo Bice, Constantine Maroulis
- Start date: July 12, 2005
- End date: September 11, 2005
- No. of shows: 44
- Box office: US$17.3 million from 43 shows

American Idol concert chronology
- American Idols Live! Tour 2004 (2004); American Idols Live! Tour 2005 (2005); American Idols Live! Tour 2006 (2006)

American Idols Live! Tour 2005 was a summer concert tour in the United States and Canada featuring the top 10 contestants of the fourth season of American Idol, which aired in 2005. It was sponsored by Kellogg Pop-Tarts. It followed in the tradition of other American Idol summer tours following the completion of each season in May. After the poor attendance of the tour the previous year, the tour was scaled down somewhat. Forty dates were initially planned, four more dates were however later added. An extra show was further added at the end of the tour as a benefit concert for the victims of Hurricane Katrina which struck Mississippi two weeks earlier.

Before the Las Vegas show, runner-up Bo Bice came down with serious stomach pains and was rushed to the hospital. He was diagnosed with a blockage in his intestines, and received emergency surgery. He returned for the last two shows of the tour in Syracuse, New York. Bice also broke his foot on stage earlier in the tour at Manchester.

== Performers ==
Top 10
Carrie Underwood (winner)	Bo Bice (2nd place)
Vonzell Solomon (3rd place)	Anthony Fedorov (4th place)
Scott Savol (5th place)	Constantine Maroulis (6th place)
Anwar Robinson (7th place)	Nadia Turner (8th place)
Nikko Smith (9th place)	Jessica Sierra (10th place)

== Show overview ==
Shows from this year's tour differed significantly from the previous three tours. Each performer performed their own set of two to three songs to showcase their differing talent. Unlike previous years, ensemble singing was more limited. There were only a few duets in addition to the obligatory final group performance which consisted of two songs in this tour. The individual sets started off with tenth-place finisher Jessica Sierra and ending with the winner Carrie Underwood, but those in between did not performed in elimination order. The first half of the show ended with Nadia Turner's set, and the second half began with a duet between Anwar Robinson and Vonzell Solomon.

Bo Bice was absent throughout most of the later part of the tour due to his serious nature of his illness that required surgery, and this necessitated modifications and re-arrangement to the tour set list. Extra songs were added by some singers, and a group performance by the male singers was also added.

== Setlist ==
- Jessica Sierra – "(Boys Are) Back in Town" (The Busboys), "Shop Around" (The Miracles)
- Anwar Robinson – "A House Is Not a Home" (Dionne Warwick), "What a Wonderful World" (Louis Armstrong)
- Constantine Maroulis – "Hard to Handle" (Otis Redding), "My Funny Valentine" (Frank Sinatra), "Bohemian Rhapsody" (Queen)
- Nikko Smith – "Part-Time Lover" (Stevie Wonder), "Incomplete" (Sisqó), "Like I Love You" (Justin Timberlake)
- Scott Savol – "Against All Odds (Take a Look at Me Now)" (Phil Collins)
- Savol and Sierra – "Total Eclipse of the Heart" (Bonnie Tyler)
- Savol – "She's Gone" (Hall & Oates)
- Nadia Turner – "The Power of Love" (Ashley Cleveland), "You Don't Have to Say You Love Me" (Dusty Springfield), "Fire" (Jimi Hendrix)/Try a Little Tenderness/(Otis Redding)

Intermission

- Robinson and Vonzell Solomon – "Superstition" (Stevie Wonder), "Karma" (Alicia Keys)
- Solomon – "I Have Nothing" (Whitney Houston), "Best of My Love" (The Emotions), "I'm Every Woman" (Chaka Khan)
- Anthony Fedorov – "Everytime You Go Away" (Hall & Oates), "Can You Stop the Rain" (Peabo Bryson), "I've Got You" (Marc Anthony)
- Bo Bice – "I Don't Want to Be" (Gavin DeGraw), "Vehicle" (Ides of March), "Voodoo Chile" (The Jimi Hendrix Experience), "Sweet Home Alabama" (Lynyrd Skynyrd)
- Carrie Underwood – "Sin Wagon" (Dixie Chicks), "Independence Day" (Martina McBride), "Alone" (Heart), "Inside Your Heaven" (Carrie Underwood)
- Underwood and Bice – "Bless the Broken Road" (Rascal Flatts)
- Top 10 – "Lean on Me" (The Temptations) and "R.O.C.K. in the U.S.A. (A Salute to '60s Rock)" (John Mellencamp)

== Additional notes ==
- After he broke his foot during the previous show in Manchester, New Hampshire, Bo Bice replaced "I Don't Wanna Be" with "Desperado" (Eagles) from Cleveland onwards so he can perform seated at the piano.
- Nadia Turner was absent in Manchester due to illness.
- Beginning on August 18 in Las Vegas, Bo Bice did not perform due to his surgery until the end of the tour except for the last two shows.
- A number of changes were made after Bo Bice's departure – a video of him performing "Vehicle" was shown, then "Sweet Home Alabama" was performed as a group song by the five remaining men.
- Carrie Underwood performed "Cold Day in July" (Dixie Chicks cover) instead of her duet with Bo "Bless the Broken Road" in Las Vegas, but she later chose to perform "Bless the Broken Road" as a solo.
- Anwar Robinson also added "Ribbon in the Sky" (Stevie Wonder) in Las Vegas.
- Constantine Maroulis's set was moved down to the second half to replace Bo Bice's set.
- On August 20 in San Jose Vonzell Solomon added "I'll Never Love This Way Again" to her set list.
- On August 17 in Los Angeles, Anthony Fedorov added "Historia de un Amor" to his set list.
- Bo Bice returned to perform his set in New York, but did not perform his song "We Can't Change This World" at the Hurricane Katrina benefit show as previously announced in the press.

== Tour dates ==
Date	City	Country	Venue	Attendance			Gross
Date	City	Country	Venue	Sales	Capacity	Percentage	Gross
July 12, 2005	Sunrise	United States	Office Depot Center	9,750	9,750	100%	$420,958
July 13, 2005	Tampa	United States	St. Pete Times Forum	9,510	10,707	88.8%	$406,153
July 15, 2005	Birmingham	United States	BJCC Arena	11,004	11,004	100%	$493,458
July 16, 2005	Duluth	United States	Arena at Gwinnett Center	9,986	10,299	97.0%	$453,402
July 17, 2005	Greensboro	United States	Greensboro Coliseum	8,374	23,500	36%	$357,280
July 19, 2005	Reading	United States	Sovereign Center	7,169	7,169	100%	$304,405
July 20, 2005	Toronto	Canada	Air Canada Centre	8,762	19,800	44%	$337,692
July 22, 2005	East Rutherford	United States	Continental Airlines Arena	14,519	14,519	100%	$660,882
July 23, 2005	Uniondale	United States	Nassau Coliseum	13,012	13,012	100%	$587,686
July 24, 2005	Philadelphia	United States	Wachovia Center	14,304	14,304	100%	$633,132
July 26, 2005	Wilkes-Barre	United States	Wachovia Arena	8,322	8,400	99.1%	$358,040
July 27, 2005	Washington, D.C.	United States	MCI Center	12,328	13,349	92.4%	$552,194
July 29, 2005	Hartford	United States	Hartford Civic Center	12,187	12,187	100%	$545,429
July 30, 2005	Worcester	United States	DCU Center	10,655	10,655	100%	$461,084
July 31, 2005	Manchester	United States	Verizon Wireless Arena	9,241	9,241	100%	$404,996
August 2, 2005	Cleveland	United States	Wolstein Center	10,459	10,726	97.5%	$452,662
August 3, 2005	Columbus	United States	Value City Arena	9,654	11,109	86.9%	$428,705
August 4, 2005	Detroit	United States	Joe Louis Arena	10,284	11,621	88.5%	$468,552
August 6, 2005	Saint Paul	United States	Xcel Energy Center	10,324	11,005	93.8%	$467,667
August 8, 2005	Chicago	United States	United Center	10,900	12000	90.8%	$477,850
August 9, 2005	St. Louis	United States	Savvis Center	9,667	10,162	95.1%	$440,369
August 10, 2005	Norman	United States	Lloyd Noble Center	6,442	12,000	54%	$294,653
August 13, 2005	Grand Prairie	United States	Nokia Live	6,013	6,013	100%	$289,427
August 14, 2005	San Antonio	United States	SBC Center	4,142	6,664	62.2%	$188,422
August 16, 2005	Glendale	United States	Glendale Arena	6,417	8,792	73.0%	$302,277
August 17, 2005	Los Angeles	United States	Staples Center	12,030	13,267	90.7%	$544,269
August 18, 2005	Las Vegas	United States	Thomas & Mack Center	6,288	18,069	35%	$293,804
August 20, 2005	San Jose	United States	HP Pavilion at San Jose	11,084	12,163	91.1%	$470,380
August 21, 2005	Sacramento	United States	ARCO Arena	8,618	9,680	89.0%	$397,012
August 23, 2005	Everett	United States	Everett Events Center	6,702	7,579	88.4%	$307,374
August 24, 2005	Portland	United States	Rose Garden Arena	8,785	10,500	82%	$383,706
August 26, 2005	Salt Lake City	United States	Delta Center	6,497	18,306	35%	$285,105
August 28, 2005	Des Moines	United States	Wells Fargo Arena	3,657	6,081	60.1%	$164,272
August 30, 2005	Green Bay	United States	Resch Center	6,688	7,522	88.9%	$304,226
August 31, 2005	Milwaukee	United States	Bradley Center	6,787	20,000	63%	$309,569
September 2, 2005	Albany	United States	Pepsi Arena	10,937	11,783	92.8%	$476,512
September 3, 2005	Pittsburgh	United States	Mellon Arena	8,023	12,800	83%	$361,237
September 4, 2005	Norfolk	United States	Constant Convocation Center	6,274	9,520	66%	$283,241
September 6, 2005	East Rutherford	United States	Continental Airlines Arena	10,671	14,799	72.1%	$504,678
September 7, 2005	Uniondale	United States	Nassau Coliseum	10,474	11,789	88.9%	$487,022
September 8, 2005	Providence	United States	Dunkin' Donuts Center	10,274	10,661	96.4%	$453,948
September 9, 2005	Portland	United States	Cumberland County Civic Center	6,235	6,235	100%	$267,595
September 10, 2005	Syracuse	United States	War Memorial at Oncenter	11,928	11,928	100%	$524,820
September 11, 2005	Syracuse	United States	War Memorial at Oncenter	11,928	11,928	100%	$524,820

== Response ==
The tour returned to form after the dismal Season 3 tour. Excluding the sold-out Hurricane Katrina benefit show, the average attendance was at 89% capacity, with 12 of the 43 shows sold out. Excluding the last charity show in Syracuse, the revenue from ticket sales totalled $17,364,290 million with 392,094 tickets sold according to Billboard.

== Tour summary ==
- Number of shows – 44 (13 sold out)
- Total gross – $17,364,290 (43 shows)
- Total attendance – 392,094 (43 shows)
- Average attendance – 9,118 (89%)
- Average ticket price – $44.29
