= American Idol Season 4: The Showstoppers =

Compilation album by Various Artists
- Released: May 17, 2005
- Genre: Pop
- Label: RCA
- Producer: Desmond Child

Various Artists chronology
Season 3: Greatest Soul Classics (2004)	American Idol Season 4: The Showstoppers (2005)	Season 5: Encores (2006)

Season 4: The Showstoppers contains one cover song from each of the top 12 finalists during season 4 of the television show American Idol, along with a song that features all 12 of them together.

The CD was certified gold on July 26, 2005.

1. "Independence Day" (Martina McBride) – 3:22 Carrie Underwood
2. "I Don't Wanna Be" (Gavin DeGraw) – 3:40 Bo Bice
3. "Best of My Love" (The Emotions) – 3:31 Vonzell Solomon
4. "A House Is Not A Home" (Luther Vandross) – 3:18 Anwar Robinson
5. "You Don't Have to Say You Love Me" (Dusty Springfield) – 2:54 Nadia Turner
6. "Part-Time Lover" (Stevie Wonder) – 3:44 Nikko Smith
7. "My Funny Valentine" (from Babes in Arms) – 3:16 Constantine Maroulis
8. "Total Eclipse of the Heart" (Bonnie Tyler) – 4:33 Jessica Sierra
9. "Every Time You Go Away" (Paul Young) – 3:53 Anthony Fedorov
10. "Against All Odds (Take a Look at Me Now)" (Phil Collins) – 3:21 Scott Savol
11. "Knock On Wood" (Eddie Floyd) – 2:52 Lindsey Cardinale
12. "God Bless the Child" (Billie Holiday) – 3:32 Mikalah Gordon
13. "When You Tell Me That You Love Me" (Diana Ross) – 3:44 American Idol Season 4 Finalists
