= Scott Savol =

American singer (born 1976)

Scott T. Savol
- Born: Scott Thomas Savol; April 30, 1976 (age 50)
- Origin: Cleveland, Ohio, United States
- Genres: Gospel, soft rock, pop, R&B
- Occupation: Musician
- Instrument: Vocals
- Years active: 2005–present

Scott Thomas Savol (born April 30, 1976) is an American singer and was the 5th place finalist on the fourth season of American Idol.

== Personal life ==
Savol was born in Cleveland, Ohio, but lived in Shaker Heights, Ohio. Savol has a son named Brandon. He resides in Cleveland, where Savol continues to sing professionally.

During the American Idol competition, The Smoking Gun reported that Savol had previously been charged with misdemeanor assault for hitting his girlfriend and mother of his son, Michele Martin, with a telephone on February 14, 2001, so hard that the phone broke. Savol pleaded the charge down to disorderly conduct, for which he received probation and was ordered to complete a domestic abuse or anger management class; his girlfriend received a temporary restraining order against him. Idol producers responded that Savol had already disclosed this incident to them and that "considering Scott's honesty and his remorse, the situation did not warrant his disqualification."

== American Idol ==
Savol made it into the final five on Idol and then became the eighth contestant to be voted off the show, on May 4, after singing George Benson's version of "On Broadway" and Brian McKnight's "Everytime You Go Away" during a dual-themed week of songs written by Leiber and Stoller and songs presently on the Billboard charts. During his run on the show, Savol was affectionately dubbed "Scotty the Body" by Idol host Ryan Seacrest.

The fact that Savol outlasted many singers who were often considered superior to him (such as Jessica Sierra, Nikko Smith, Nadia Turner, Anwar Robinson and Constantine Maroulis) led many commentators to speculate that a portion of Savol's "fan base" actually consisted of people who were attempting to destroy the credibility of American Idol by voting for someone they considered the worst finalist. Other people suggested Savol was supported by Christian voters because Savol frequently thanked God after his performances, or by voters who saw him as an underdog or "regular Joe" due to his lack of stereotypical pop star looks. Often, he would draw comparisons to actors Mark Addy and Kevin James.

== List of performances on American Idol ==
Week	Theme	Song Sung	Artist	Status
Top 24	Semifinals; Top 12 (Men)	"You Are My Lady"	Freddie Jackson	Advanced
Top 20	Semifinals; Top 10 (Men)	"Never Too Much"	Luther Vandross	Advanced
Top 16	Semifinals; Top 8 (Men)	"I Can't Help Myself (Sugar Pie Honey Bunch)"	Four Tops	Advanced
Top 12	Songs of the 1960s	"Ain't Too Proud to Beg"	The Temptations	Safe
Top 11	Billboard #1	"Against All Odds (Take a Look at Me Now)"	Phil Collins	Safe
Top 10	Songs of the 1990s	"One Last Cry"	Brian McKnight	Safe
Top 9	Songs of Broadway	"The Impossible Dream (The Quest)"	Man of La Mancha	Bottom 2
Top 8	Year They Were Born	"She's Gone"	Hall & Oates	Bottom 3
Top 7	1970s Dance Music	"Everlasting Love"	Robert Knight	Bottom 3^{1}
Top 6	Songs of the 21st Century	"Dance with My Father"	Luther Vandross	Safe
Top 5	Leiber and Stoller; Billboard Top 40	"On Broadway" "Everytime You Go Away"	George Benson; Brian McKnight	Eliminated

- ^Note 1 When Ryan Seacrest announced the results for this particular night, Savol was among the bottom three contestants, but was declared safe when Anwar Robinson was eliminated.

== Post Idol ==
Savol performed for a brief stint at the Lubbock Memorial Civic Center in Lubbock, Texas, as the Cowardly Lion, in Todrick Hall's retelling of The Wizard of Oz. Oz, the Musical sold out both nights. He starred alongside Season Two alumni Rickey Smith as the Tinman, Season 4 alumna Mikalah Gordon as Dorothy, and Vonzell Solomon as Glinda/Aunt Em. He has an upcoming song titled "Don't Rush," produced by Washington, DC–based production team The BeatMoguls, that is hitting the airwaves.

In June 2008, Savol starred as one of the headliners for a live music show in Branson, Missouri named "America's Favorite Finalists." The show featured 6 top 12 American Idol Finalists performing their own music, cover songs and group numbers. The show ran at the Grand Palace and was produced by Steve Drummond.

From the summer of 2009 until the spring of 2010, Savol starred as Billy, in Garrett Davis's play The Lord Will Make a Way.

Savol signed with Mahoning Valley Records and began recording his debut album in January 2010, and the album In Spite of All was released late 2011. Producers for the album include Kevin Deane, Sim Stevenson, William B. Smith, Kene Bell and Savol himself. The first single entitled "Beauty Queen", produced by Kene Bell and was released the summer of 2010.

Scott performed in a live music show in Branson, Missouri, named "Finalists Live" in 2012.

== Discography ==
=== Albums ===
Title	Details
In Spite of All	Release date: December 12, 2011; Label: Mahoning Valley Records; Format: Digital download
