= Osborne Earl Smith =

Osborne Earl Smith may refer to:

- Ozzie Smith (Osborne Earl Smith; born 1954), American baseball player
- Nikko Smith (Osborne Earl Smith Jr.; born 1982), American singer-songwriter and Ozzie Smith's son
