= Baby V =

People, places, and things commonly known as Baby V include:

- Vanessa Hudgens — American actress and singer
- Vonzell Solomon — American singer
