= Nadia Turner =

American singer

- Born: January 11, 1977 (age 48); Miami, Florida, U.S.
- Genres: Rock, funk
- Occupation(s): Actress, singer, songwriter, television personality
- Years active: 2004–present
- Labels: Knodic Records

Nadia Turner (born January 11, 1977) is an American singer, songwriter, actress and radio/television personality, best known as the eighth place finalist on the fourth season of American Idol.

== Career ==
=== Pre-American Idol ===
Turner was a former Miami Dolphins cheerleader in 1996.

In 2000, she sang at the 26th G8 summit to President Clinton and seven world leaders in Okinawa, Japan.

=== 2005: American Idol ===
Week#	Song	Original Artist	Result
Top 24	The Power of Love	Ashley Cleveland	Safe
Top 20	My Love	Paul McCartney	Safe
Top 16	Try A Little Tenderness	Otis Redding	Safe
Top 12	"You Don't Have to Say You Love Me"	Dusty Springfield	Safe
Top 11	Time After Time	Cyndi Lauper	Bottom 2
Top 10	I'm The Only One	Melissa Etheridge	Bottom 3
Top 9	As Long As He Needs Me	Oliver!	Safe
Top 8	When I Dream	Crystal Gayle	Eliminated

=== 2006–present: Post-American Idol ===
Since exiting American Idol, Turner has made guest appearances on The Ellen DeGeneres Show, The Tonight Show with Jay Leno, The Tony Danza Show and served as a guest host on The View in December, 2006.

Turner has performed and hosted many charities such as Big Brothers Big Sisters "Big Event" at the American Airlines Arena, UM Sylvester Cancer Foundation, The Pet Project, and SOS Children Village. She was invited to Kuwait by a bloodline of Kuwait's royal family to perform at a private New Year's Eve party.

Turner also performed at the 30th Anniversary Gala of FIU Biscayne Bay Campus. She hosted and performed at the post-game show at the home opening game of the 2007 season of the Florida Marlins at the Dolphin Stadium, along with fellow Idol contestants Ace Young, Mandisa, Anthony Fedorov, and Jessica Sierra.

Turner's debut album, entitled Standing On Love, is scheduled for an undetermined date, and is currently without a label.

Turner has a lead role in the urban romantic comedy Lord Help Us, which premiered at the Pan African Film & Arts Festival and was released on DVD by Image Entertainment in May 2007.

In 2008, her single "Standing On Love" is part of the Edy's SlowChurned Icecream promotional CD "Hot Tracks" available for free with ice cream purchasing at participating stores. The disc also includes another seven tracks from former Idol performers. It was also released as a single with another song, "Beautiful Man."

In 2021, Turner's daughter, Zaréh, auditioned for American Idol with "Bust Your Windows" by Jazmine Sullivan, where she was unanimously put through to Hollywood. However, she was eliminated after the R&B segment of the "Genre Challenge" round of Hollywood Week after performing "One and Only" by Adele.

== Discography ==
Year	Song	Album
2005	"You Don't Have To Say You Love Me"	American Idol Season 4: The Showstoppers
2008	"Standing on Love"	Edy's SlowChurned Hot Tracks, Standing on Love - Single
2008	"Beautiful Man"	Standing On Love - Single
