= Inside Your Heaven =

2005 American Idol winner's single

Single by Carrie Underwood
- A-side: "Independence Day"
- Released: June 14, 2005
- Recorded: 2005
- Studio: The Gentlemen's Club, Capitol Records, The Record Plant, The Village (Los Angeles)
- Genre: Country; country pop
- Length: 3:45 (album version); 4:03 (Greatest Hits: Decade #1 version)
- Label: Arista; 19; S
- Songwriters: Andreas Carlsson; Pelle Nylén; Savan Kotecha
- Producer: Desmond Child

Carrie Underwood singles chronology
"Inside Your Heaven" (2005)	"Jesus, Take the Wheel" (2005)

Audio
- "Inside Your Heaven" on YouTube

"Inside Your Heaven"

Single by Bo Bice
- A-side: "Vehicle"
- Released: June 21, 2005
- Recorded: 2005
- Studio: The Gentlemen's Club, Capitol Records, The Record Plant, The Village (Los Angeles)
- Genre: Pop
- Length: 4:12
- Label: RCA; BMG; 19; S
- Songwriters: Andreas Carlsson; Pelle Nylén; Savan Kotecha
- Producer: Desmond Child

Bo Bice singles chronology
"Inside Your Heaven" (2005)	"The Real Thing" (2006)

Audio
- "Inside Your Heaven" on YouTube

"Inside Your Heaven" is a song written by Andreas Carlsson, Pelle Nylén, Savan Kotecha, and produced by Desmond Child. Carrie Underwood and Bo Bice, the final two contestants on the fourth season of American Idol, each released a version of the song in June 2005.

Underwood, the winner of Idol, released her version as a single on June 14, 2005. Despite poor critical reception, it debuted at number one on the US Billboard Hot 100 and on the Canadian Singles Chart, where it remained for one and seven weeks, respectively. The other A-side of the single is a cover of the Martina McBride song "Independence Day". Bice's version was released the following week, on June 21, and peaked at number two on the Billboard Hot 100 and Canadian Singles Chart. This version's A-side is a cover of the song "Vehicle" by the Ides of March.

The song gave Underwood the Billboard Music Awards for "Top-Selling Country Single of the Year" and "Top-Selling Hot 100 Song of the Year" (Bice's version was also nominated in this category). It also helped Underwood win the award for "Country Single Sales Artist of the Year". Underwood later included "Inside Your Heaven" on her debut studio album, Some Hearts (2005).

== Critical reception ==
Chuck Taylor of Billboard magazine reviewed the two renditions of "Inside Your Heaven" on the June 18, 2005, issue. Calling the overall song "difficult" and "dauntingly shallow," he considered Bo Bice's version more meaningful than Carrie Underwood's, saying of the latter, "'Inside Your Heaven' leaves [Underwood] little room but to shriek across so many octaves that even Celine Dion would leave this song in tatters". Reviewing Underwood's album Some Hearts on AllMusic, Stephen Thomas Erlewine labeled "Inside Your Heaven" as the worst song on the album, writing that the country pop formula used throughout the album does not work for this track, calling it "sappy and transparent" with a weak arrangement.

== Commercial performance ==
=== Carrie Underwood version ===
Underwood's version of "Inside Your Heaven" was released on June 14, 2005. On July 2, 2005, the song debuted atop the US Billboard Hot 100 as the "Hot Shot Debut", interrupting the 14-week reign of Mariah Carey's "We Belong Together" for this issue alone. The following week, the song dropped to number three, and it spent a total of 12 weeks on the listing, making its final appearance at number 98 on September 17, 2005. "Inside Your Heaven" gave Underwood the distinction of becoming the first country musician to debut at number one and the only solo country artist to obtain a number-one single during the 2000s decade. "Inside Your Heaven" also debuted at number one on the Billboard Pop 100 chart, losing the position the following week to Bice's version. Sales was the primary driver for the song's chart performance, ranking number 20 on the year-end for the sales component chart while failing to enter the weekly chart for the airplay component. The track additionally appeared on the Billboard Adult Contemporary and Hot Country Songs charts, reaching number 12 and number 52, respectively. It was the 71st-best-selling hit and the 23rd-most-successful adult contemporary song of 2005 in the US.

In Canada, the song charted alongside "Independence Day", immediately topping the Canadian Singles Chart and staying there for seven weeks, until August 20, 2005. It spent 35 weeks on the listing. The Recording Industry Association of America (RIAA) awarded the song a platinum certification in October 2025 for sales and streaming units exceeding 1,000,000. Music Canada awarded the single a double-platinum certification, denoting shipments exceeding 20,000 units. As of June 2009, the song has sold 362,000 digital copies and 459,000 physical copies in the US alone.

=== Bo Bice version ===
Bice released his rendition of the song of June 21, 2005, a week after Underwood's. In effect, it first appeared on the Billboard Hot 100 the week after Underwood's version had done the same, at number two, on July 9, 2005, becoming that week's "Hot Shot Debut" as well. It quickly fell down the chart afterwards, remaining in the top 100 for seven issues and spending its last week at number 89 on August 20. On the Pop 100, "Inside Your Heaven" succeeded Underwood's version at the top spot on the July 9 issue.

The same day, on the Canadian Singles Chart, Bice's version entered at its peak of number two with "Vehicle". It spent six weeks at that position before losing its place on August 20, going on to log 29 weeks on the ranking. In July, it earned a gold certification from the RIAA for shipping over 500,000 physical copies in the US. Meanwhile, in Canada during the same month, it sold over 10,000 units, allowing it to receive a platinum disc from Music Canada. As of June 2009, Bice's version has shipped over 349,000 physical units and sold over 52,000 digital copies.

== Aftermath ==
Following her win on American Idol, Underwood officially signed with Arista Records and embarked on the American Idols Live! Tour 2005 with the other top-10 finalists of the fourth season, including Bice. She has since become one of the competition's most successful alumni, selling more than 70 million records worldwide, earning numerous awards, and accruing a net worth of $200 million as of May 2020. Bice has since released three albums, founded his own record label, and fronted American band Blood, Sweat and Tears during their tours.

== Awards ==
Year	Award	Category	Nominee(s)	Result	Ref.
2005	Billboard Music Awards	Top-Selling Hot 100 Song of the Year	Carrie Underwood	Won	
2005	Billboard Music Awards	Top-Selling Country Single	Carrie Underwood	Won	
2005	Billboard Music Awards	Top-Selling Hot 100 Song of the Year	Bo Bice	Nominated	

== Track listings ==
=== Carrie Underwood version ===
US CD single

1. "Inside Your Heaven"
2. "Independence Day"

US 7-inch single

A. "Inside Your Heaven" (radio version) – 3:26
B. "Independence Day" (radio version) – 3:24

=== Bo Bice version ===
US CD single

1. "Inside Your Heaven"
2. "Vehicle" (featuring Richie Sambora)

US 7-inch single

A. "Inside Your Heaven" – 4:12
B. "Vehicle" (featuring Richie Sambora) – 2:49

== Credits and personnel ==
Credits are adapted from the liner notes of the CD singles. Both versions of the song were recorded at The Gentlemen's Club, Capitol Records, The Record Plant, and The Village (Los Angeles).

Both versions

- Andreas Carlsson – writer, background vocals
- Pelle Nylén – writing
- Savan Kotecha – piano, writing
- Desmond Child – production, background vocals
- Joe Yannece – drums, master
- Brian Coleman – production management
- Simon Fuller – management
- 19 Management – management
- Michael Segal – photography
- Harry Sommerdahl – keyboards, programming, arrangement, recording
- Eric Bazilian – guitar, mandolin
- John Pierce – bass
- Abe Laboriel Jr. – drums
- Kim Bullard – organ, strings
- Storm Lee – vocals
- Jules Gondar – recording
- Steve Churchyard – recording
- Matt Gruber – recording
- Suren Wijeyaratne – assistant engineering
- Jimmy Hoyson – assistant engineering
- Mike Eleopoulos – assistant engineering
- Noel Zancanella – assistant engineering
- Carrie Underwood – background vocals
- Jules Gondar – recording

Carrie Underwood version

- Carrie Underwood – lead vocals
- Serban Ghenea – mixing
- Tim Roberts – drums, assistant mix engineering
- John Hanes – piano, additional Pro Tools engineering
- Jeanette Olsson – background vocals
- Gretchen Peters – strings, writing
- Randy Cantor – guitar, bass, lap steel guitar, keyboards, programming, recording
- Jacob Miller – additional vocal production
- Carlos Alvarez – mixing
- Bryan Golder – recording
- Mikal Blue – recording
- Stephen Crook – recording
- Clarita Sanchaz – assistant mix engineering

Bo Bice version

- Bo Bice – lead vocals, background vocals
- Kevin Mills – piano, assistant mix engineering
- Greg Collins – mixing
- John Shanks – background vocals
- Jim Peterik – bass guitar, writing
- Corky James – strings
- Andy Ackland – bass guitar, recording
- Glenn Pittman – assistant engineering
- Mike Houge – lead guitar, assistant engineering
- Ray Herrmann – saxophone
- Nick Lane – trombone arrangement, horn arrangement
- Rafael Padilla – percussion
- Victor Indrizzo – drums
- Richie Sambora – background vocals, guitar
- Paul Bushnell – background vocals
- Jeff Steele – bass

== Charts ==
=== Weekly charts ===
==== Carrie Underwood version ====
Chart (2005)	Peak position
Canada (Nielsen SoundScan)	1
US Billboard Hot 100	1
US Adult Contemporary (Billboard)	12
US Country Singles Sales (Billboard) with "Independence Day"	1
US Hot Country Songs (Billboard)	52
US Pop 100 (Billboard)	1

==== Bo Bice version ====
Chart (2005)	Peak position
Canada (Nielsen SoundScan)	2
US Billboard Hot 100	2

=== Year-end charts ===
==== Carrie Underwood version ====
Chart (2005)	Position
US Billboard Hot 100	71
US Adult Contemporary (Billboard)	23

== Certifications ==
=== Carrie Underwood version ===
Region	Certification	Certified units/sales
Canada (Music Canada)	2× Platinum	20,000^{^}
United States (RIAA)	Platinum	1,000,000^{‡}
^{^} Shipments figures based on certification alone.^{‡} Sales+streaming figures based on certification alone.

=== Bo Bice version ===
Region	Certification	Certified units/sales
Canada (Music Canada)	Platinum	10,000^{^}
United States (RIAA)	Gold	500,000^{^}
^{^} Shipments figures based on certification alone.

== Release history ==
Region	Version	Date	Format(s)	Label(s)	Ref.
United States	Underwood	June 14, 2005	7-inch vinyl; CD	Arista; 19; S	
United States	Bice	June 21, 2005	7-inch vinyl; CD	RCA; BMG; 19; S	
United States	Underwood	July 5, 2005	Hot adult contemporary radio	Arista; 19; S	

== See also ==
- List of Hot 100 number-one singles of 2005 (U.S.)
- List of Pop 100 number-one singles (U.S.)
- List of Canadian number-one singles of 2005
