= Gayme Show =

- Genre: Comedy
- Created by: Dave Mizzoni; Matt Rogers
- Written by: Dave Mizzoni; Matt Rogers; Genevieve Aniello; Jill Gutowitz
- Directed by: Michael Dempsey
- Presented by: Dave Mizzoni; Matt Rogers
- No. of seasons: 1
- No. of episodes: 8

Production
- Executive producers: Brooke Posch; Séamus Murphy-Mitchell; Tony Hernandez
- Producer: Erin Owens
- Editors: Chris Poole; Kati Skelton; Zena Grey

Original release
- Network: Quibi
- Release: April 6 – April 13, 2020

Gayme Show (stylized as GAYME SHOW!) is an American unscripted comedy show that debuted April 6, 2020 as a part of the premiere content roll out for mobile streaming service Quibi.

In each episode, two straight-identifying contestants go head-to-head with a celebrity “life partner” as they face a series of physical and mental challenges. The winner of each round is given the tongue-in-cheek title of “Queen of the Straights.”

The show was created, written and is hosted by comedians Dave Mizzoni and Matt Rogers.

In June 2020, it was announced the series was renewed for a second season. The future of the series is unknown following Quibi's shutdown in December 2020. It did move with the rest of Quibi's library to The Roku Channel in 2021.

Vonzell Solomon sings the show's theme song as well as the transitions in between rounds.

== Episodes ==
No.	Title	Contestants	Wise Queer	Woman Who Gets It	Original release date
1	"What Lies Beneath"	Jon Gabrus; Moshe Kasher	Bowen Yang	Ilana Glazer	April 6, 2020
2	"Respect Kirsten"	Whitmer Thomas; Tim Baltz	Trixie Mattel (Note: Trixie Mattel was instead introduced as the "Wise Queen".)	Liza Treyger	April 6, 2020
3	"Hear Her"	Max Silvestri; Will Miles	Jon Lovett	Robin Thede	April 6, 2020
4	"Gay Oregon Trail"	Rhys Mitchell; David Gborie	Bob the Drag Queen	D'Arcy Carden	April 7, 2020
5	"Notice Me, Father"	Demi Adejuyigbe; John Gemberling	Brendan Scannell	Patti Harrison	April 8, 2020
6	"Acting Battle"	George Basil; Yoni Lotan	Sydnee Washington	Rachel Bloom	April 9, 2020
7	"She's Running"	Moses Storm; Josh Gondelman	Joel Kim Booster	Nicole Byer	April 10, 2020
8	"Best Supporting Actress"	Langston Kerman; Andrew Ti	Guy Branum	Tawny Newsome	April 13, 2020
