= Lindsey Cardinale =

American drummer

- Born: Lindsey Michele Cardinale; February 5, 1985 (age 41); Hammond, Louisiana, U.S.
- Genre: Country
- Occupation: Singer
- Years active: 2005–present

Lindsey Michelle Cardinale (/ˌkɑːrdɪˈnɛli/; born February 5, 1985) is an American country singer who was the twelfth-place finalist on the fourth season of American Idol in 2005.

Cardinale was born in Hammond, Louisiana, to Agnes and Anthony Cardinale. In 1991, when she was six years old, she and her family moved to Ponchatoula. She has an older sister, Lori. She is a 2003 graduate of Ponchatoula High School, where she was a member of the advanced choir. During her run on American Idol, she was a university student majoring in radiology. In addition to singing, she also plays guitar, piano, drums, and the fiddle.

== American Idol ==
The 19-year-old Cardinale auditioned in New Orleans with Karla Bonoff's "Standing Right Next to Me". In the Hollywood rounds, she sang "Ain't No Mountain High Enough," "I Can't Help Myself (Sugar Pie Honey Bunch)," (along with semi-finalist Melinda Lira and fellow finalist Jessica Sierra) and "The Woman in Me (Needs the Man in You)." She went on to the three-round semi-finals composed of the top 12 women and top 12 men. There she sang "Standing Right Next to Me," "I Try to Think About Elvis," and "I Don't Want to Miss a Thing." She made it to the top 12 alongside 11 others. On March 16, 2005, she was voted off, after her performance of "Knock on Wood" during the 1960s-theme music week. Cardinale later freely admitted that she did not enjoy singing "Knock on Wood" and tried everything she could to get out of recording it for the subsequent American Idol compilation album, but ultimately had to accept it and record it. Cardinale was also included on the AI season four's charity single to benefit the Red Cross Tsunami Relief Fund, "When You Tell Me That You Love Me," along with the other 11 finalists.

=== American Idol performances ===
Week #	Song choice	Original artist	Result
Top 24	"Standing Right Next to Me"	Karla Bonoff	Safe
Top 20	"I Try to Think About Elvis"	Patty Loveless	Safe
Top 16	"I Don't Want to Miss a Thing"	Aerosmith	Safe
Top 12	"Knock on Wood"	Eddie Floyd	Eliminated

== Post-Idol career ==
Cardinale appeared at Ponchatoula's Strawberry Festival shortly after her elimination; she thanked her hometown for their contributions that helped her place twelfth out of hundreds of thousands of auditions. However, her contract with 19 Entertainment prevented her from singing at the fair, so she played the drums instead. A year later at the festival, on April 8, 2006, Cardinale put on an hour-long show of cover tunes and original songs.

Cardinale became the model and spokesperson for the Bill Hood Automotive Family in Southern Louisiana. In 2006, she released a maxi single featuring the songs "Drive" and "Nothin' Like a Dream" in Germany in the Eurovision Song Contest.

In late 2007, it was announced that Cardinale had signed with Aria Records Nashville; she began work on her debut album with record producer Paul Jackson.

The 2007 self-titled album by Stephen Cochran features a duet with Cardinale.

She returned to her college studies, but switched to double majors in journalism and psychology, with a minor in songwriting, at Belmont University; graduation was anticipated for 2011. She continues with occasional Idol-related performances, such as the American Christmas show at Lincoln Theatre in Napa County, California in 2009.

In early 2015, Cardinale signed with Silvercreek Records in Nashville.

Cardinale was a part of the "American Christmas" album and 2005 RCA album, "The Showstoppers". She is a member of Musicians On Call and St. Jude Partners of Hope.

== Discography ==
Albums

- American Idol Season 4: The Showstoppers (May 2005)

Singles

- "Nothin' Like a Dream"
- "Drive"
- "Let It Rain" (featuring Stephen Cochran)
- "Always on My Mind"
