= American Idol season 4 =

American Idol
- Season 4
- Hosted by: Ryan Seacrest
- Judges: Paula Abdul; Simon Cowell; Randy Jackson
- Winner: Carrie Underwood
- Runner-up: Bo Bice
- Finals venue: Kodak Theatre

Release
- Original network: Fox
- Original release: January 18 – May 25, 2005

Season chronology
- ← Previous; Season 3 Next → Season 5

The fourth season of American Idol premiered on January 18, 2005, and continued until May 25, 2005. It was hosted by Ryan Seacrest. Randy Jackson, Paula Abdul, and Simon Cowell returned as judges. Carrie Underwood won the season with approximately 500 million votes cast in the season and 37 million for the finale, while Bo Bice was the runner-up. Underwood since became an eight-time Grammy-winning country megastar. It was also the first season of the series to be aired in high definition.

== Changes from previous seasons ==
This was the first season where guest judges were invited to participate in the auditions.

- Mark McGrath of Sugar Ray, Washington, D.C. auditions
- Gene Simmons of Kiss, New Orleans auditions
- Kenny Loggins, Las Vegas auditions
- LL Cool J, Cleveland auditions
- Brandy, San Francisco auditions

Where there were four judges present, three "yes" votes were required for the auditioner to proceed to Hollywood.

This was also the first season with the age limit being raised to 28. Among those who benefited from this new rule were Constantine Maroulis, Bo Bice, Scott Savol, and Nadia Turner.

== Regional auditions ==
Auditions for the fourth season began on August 4, 2004, in Cleveland, Ohio. An audition was originally planned for Anchorage, Alaska, but that was canceled due to a possible schedule conflict as a result of hurricanes affecting the Orlando auditions.

American Idol (season 4) – regional auditions
City	Preliminary date	Preliminary venue	Filming date(s)	Filming venue	Golden tickets
Cleveland, Ohio	August 4, 2004	Cleveland Browns Stadium	August 14–15, 2004	Intercontinental Cleveland	32
St. Louis, Missouri	August 8, 2004	Edward Jones Dome	August 2004	Hilton St. Louis at the Ballpark	32
Washington, D.C.	August 18, 2004	Washington Convention Center	August 20–21, 2004	Renaissance Hotel Ninth St.	42
Orlando, Florida (Note: The contestants from the Orlando audition were moved to Las Vegas for the final round of the audition due to the impending Hurricane Ivan. It was originally scheduled for September 6–7, 2004, but rescheduled to September 14, 2004, to coincide with the Las Vegas audition.)	August 26, 2004	Orange County Convention Center	September 14, 2004	MGM Grand Las Vegas	16
New Orleans, Louisiana	August 31, 2004	Louisiana Superdome	September 4–5, 2004	The Roosevelt (Fairmont)	16
Las Vegas, Nevada	September 12, 2004	Orleans Arena	September 15–16, 2004	MGM Grand Conference Center	24
San Francisco, California	October 5, 2004	Cow Palace	October 7–8, 2004	The Regency Center	32
Total number of tickets to Hollywood					194

== Hollywood week ==
There were 193 contestants in the Hollywood rounds. They were split into two groups and performed on separate days at the Orpheum Theatre in Los Angeles. The contestants first chose from a list of twelve songs selected by the producers. They were separated into groups of females and males, but they performed solo with piano accompaniment and back-up singers. Ninety-five contestants were eliminated after this round (and one withdrew). The top 97 contestants competed in the second round which featured group performances. The songs for the groups were the Four Tops' "I Can't Help Myself (Sugar Pie Honey Bunch)," The Temptations' "Get Ready," Barry Manilow's "Jump Shout Boogie," The Marvelettes's "Please Mr. Postman," and The Supremes' "Where Did Our Love Go." 75 remained after this round.

In the last round, they performed a cappella. After their performances, the contestants were divided into four groups in separate rooms. Two groups were eliminated and the number of contestants was cut to 44. After further deliberation by the judges, top 24–12 women and 12 men–were selected. At the Pasadena Civic Center, each contestant took the elevator from their holding room to the floor above to see the judges, who then revealed their fate.

== Top 24 ==
The rules for this season's top 24 round were changed so as to result in an equal number of female and male contestamts. Twelve women and twelve men competed separately on consecutive nights, with two from each group being voted off each week until twelve contestants remained: six women and six men.

Color key:

This contestant was saved by the public vote.
This contestant was eliminated.

=== Top 24 (February 21 and 22) ===
Contestants are listed in the order they performed.

Top 24 (male contestants)
Contestant	Song	Result
Nikko Smith	"Part-Time Lover"	Safe
Scott Savol	"You Are My Lady"	Safe
Anthony Fedorov	"Hold On to the Nights"	Safe
Bo Bice	"Drift Away"	Safe
Travis Tucker	"My Cherie Amour"	Safe
Constantine Maroulis	"Kiss from a Rose"	Safe
David Brown	"Never Can Say Goodbye"	Safe
Jared Yates	"How Could I"	Eliminated
Anwar Robinson	"Moon River"	Safe
Judd Harris	"Travelin' Band"	Eliminated
Joseph Murena	"How Am I Supposed to Live Without You"	Safe
Mario Vazquez	"Do I Do"	Safe

Top 24 (female contestants)
Contestant	Song	Result
Vonzell Solomon	"Heat Wave"	Safe
Amanda Avila	"How Am I Supposed to Live Without You"	Safe
Janay Castine	"I Wanna Love You Forever"	Safe
Carrie Underwood	"Could've Been"	Safe
Sarah Mather	"Get Ready"	Eliminated
Melinda Lira	"The Power of Love"	Eliminated
Nadia Turner	"The Power of Love"	Safe
Celena Rae	"I Will Love Again"	Safe
Mikalah Gordon	"Young Hearts Run Free"	Safe
Lindsey Cardinale	"Standing Right Next to Me"	Safe
Jessica Sierra	"Against All Odds (Take a Look at Me Now)"	Safe
Aloha Mischeaux	"Work It Out"	Safe

=== Top 20 (February 28 and March 1) ===
Contestants are listed in the order they performed.

Top 20 (male contestants)
Contestant	Song	Result
Mario Vazquez	"I Love Music"	Safe
Anwar Robinson	"What's Going On"	Safe
Joseph Murena	"Let's Stay Together"	Eliminated
David Brown	"All in Love Is Fair"	Eliminated
Constantine Maroulis	"Hard to Handle"	Safe
Scott Savol	"Never Too Much"	Safe
Travis Tucker	"All Night Long (All Night)"	Safe
Nikko Smith	"Let's Get It On"	Safe
Anthony Fedorov	"I Want to Know What Love Is"	Safe
Bo Bice	"Whipping Post"	Safe

Top 20 (female contestants)
Contestant	Song	Result
Aloha Mischeaux	"You Don't Know My Name"	Eliminated
Lindsey Cardinale	"I Try to Think About Elvis"	Safe
Jessica Sierra	"A Broken Wing"	Safe
Mikalah Gordon	"God Bless the Child"	Safe
Celena Rae	"When the Lights Go Down"	Eliminated
Nadia Turner	"My Love"	Safe
Amanda Avila	"Turn the Beat Around"	Safe
Janay Castine	"Hit 'Em Up Style (Oops!)"	Safe
Carrie Underwood	"Piece of My Heart"	Safe
Vonzell Solomon	"If I Ain't Got You"	Safe

=== Top 16 (March 7 and 8) ===
Contestants are listed in the order they performed.

Top 16 (male contestants)
Contestant	Song	Result
Scott Savol	"I Can't Help Myself (Sugar Pie Honey Bunch)"	Safe
Bo Bice	"I'll Be"	Safe
Anthony Fedorov	"I've Got You"	Safe
Nikko Smith	"Georgia on My Mind"	Eliminated (Note: Nikko Smith was originally eliminated during the results show. However, when Mario Vazquez withdrew from the competition, Nikko was brought back as his replacement in the top 12.)
Travis Tucker	"Every Little Step"	Eliminated
Mario Vazquez	"How Can You Mend a Broken Heart"	Safe (Note: Mario Vazquez withdrew from the competition prior to the next episode.)
Constantine Maroulis	"Every Little Thing She Does Is Magic"	Safe
Anwar Robinson	"What a Wonderful World"	Safe

Top 16 (female contestants)
Contestant	Song	Result
Amanda Avila	"River Deep – Mountain High"	Eliminated
Janay Castine	"Dreaming of You"	Eliminated
Carrie Underwood	"Because You Love Me"	Safe
Vonzell Solomon	"Respect"	Safe
Nadia Turner	"Try a Little Tenderness"	Safe
Lindsey Cardinale	"I Don't Want to Miss a Thing"	Safe
Mikalah Gordon	"Somewhere"	Safe
Jessica Sierra	"The Boys Are Back in Town"	Safe

== Top 12 contestants ==
Standing - Anthony Fedorov, Vonzell Solomon, Bo Bice, Nikko Smith, Mikalah Gordon, Anwar Robinson, Nadia Turner, Lindsey Cardinale, Jessica Sierra Front - Scott Savol, Constantine Maroulis, Carrie Underwood

- Carrie Underwood (born March 10, 1983, in Muskogee, Oklahoma; 21 years old at the time of the show) was from Checotah, Oklahoma, and she auditioned in St. Louis with Bonnie Raitt's "I Can't Make You Love Me." She performed Candi Staton's "Young Hearts Run Free" in Hollywood.
- Bo Bice (born November 1, 1975, in Huntsville, Alabama; 29 years old at the time of the show) was from Helena, Alabama, and auditioned in Orlando with The Allman Brothers Band's "Whipping Post." He performed The Box Tops's "The Letter" and The Temptations' "Get Ready" in Hollywood.
- Vonzell Solomon (born March 18, 1984, in Baxley, Georgia; 20 years old at the time of the show) was from Fort Myers, Florida, and auditioned in Orlando with Aretha Franklin's "Chain of Fools." She performed Whitney Houston's "How Will I Know" in Hollywood.
- Anthony Fedorov (born May 4, 1985, in Yalta, Ukraine; 19 years old at the time of the show) was from Trevose, Pennsylvania, and auditioned in Cleveland with Jon Secada's "Angel." He performed Diana Ross' "When You Tell Me That You Love Me" and "Angel" again in Hollywood.
- Scott Savol (born April 30, 1976, in Cleveland, Ohio; 28 years old at the time of the show) was from Shaker Heights, Ohio and auditioned in Cleveland with The Carpenters' "Superstar." He performed the Four Tops' "I Can't Help Myself" in Hollywood.
- Constantine Maroulis (born September 17, 1975, in Brooklyn, New York; 29 years old at the time of the show) was from New York City and auditioned in Washington with Aerosmith's "Cryin'." In Hollywood, he performed The Box Tops's "The Letter" and the Four Tops's "I Can't Help Myself."
- Anwar Robinson (born April 21, 1979, in Newark, New Jersey; 25 years old at the time of the show) was from East Orange, New Jersey, and auditioned in Washington. He performed the Four Tops's "I Can't Help Myself" in Hollywood.
- Nadia Turner (born January 11, 1977, in Miami; 28 years old at the time of the show) auditioned in San Francisco with Aretha Franklin's "Until You Come Back to Me (That's What I'm Gonna Do)."
- Nikko Smith (born April 28, 1982, in San Diego, California; 22 years old at the time of the show) was from St. Louis, Missouri, and auditioned there with Stevie Wonder's "All I Do." In Hollywood, he performed The Temptations' "Get Ready."
- Jessica Sierra (born November 11, 1985, in Tampa, Florida; 19 years old at the time of the show) auditioned in Orlando with Etta James' "At Last." In Hollywood, she performed Diana Ross' "When You Tell Me That You Love Me."
- Mikalah Gordon (born January 14, 1988, in Las Vegas; 17 years old at the time of the show) auditioned in Las Vegas with Ella Fitzgerald's "Lullaby of Broadway" and Lauryn Hill's "Killing Me Softly with His Song." She performed Dusty Springfield's "You Don't Have to Say You Love Me" in Hollywood.
- Lindsey Cardinale (born February 5, 1985, in Hammond, Louisiana; 19 years old at the time of the show) was from Ponchatoula, Louisiana, and auditioned in New Orleans with Karla Bonoff's "Standing Right Next to Me." She performed Marvin Gaye/Tammi Terrells' "Ain't No Mountain High Enough" in Hollywood.

== Live Shows ==
Color key:

This contestant was saved by the public vote.
This contestant was in the bottom two or three, but was saved by the public vote.
This contestant was eliminated.
This contestant won American Idol.
This contestant was the runner-up.

=== Top 12 – Music from the 1960s (March 15) ===
Contestants are listed in the order they performed.

Contestant	Song	Result
Jessica Sierra	"Shop Around"	Bottom three
Anwar Robinson	"A House is Not a Home"	Safe
Mikalah Gordon	"Son of a Preacher Man"	Bottom two
Constantine Maroulis	"You've Made Me So Very Happy"	Safe
Lindsey Cardinale	"Knock on Wood"	Eliminated
Anthony Fedorov	"Breaking Up Is Hard to Do"	Safe
Nadia Turner	"You Don't Have to Say You Love Me"	Safe
Bo Bice	"Spinning Wheel"	Safe
Vonzell Solomon	"Anyone Who Had a Heart"	Safe
Scott Savol	"Ain't Too Proud to Beg"	Safe
Carrie Underwood	"When Will I Be Loved"	Safe
Nikko Smith	"I Want You Back"	Safe

Non-competition performance
Performers	Song
Top 12	"When You Tell Me That You Love Me"

=== Top 11 – Billboard number ones (March 22) ===
Contestants performed one song from the list of Billboard number one hits and are listed in the order they performed.

Contestant	Song	Result
Anthony Fedorov	"I Knew You Were Waiting (For Me)"	Bottom three
Carrie Underwood	"Alone"	Safe
Scott Savol	"Against All Odds (Take a Look at Me Now)"	Safe
Bo Bice	"Time in a Bottle"	Safe
Nikko Smith	"Incomplete"	Safe
Vonzell Solomon	"Best of My Love"	Safe
Constantine Maroulis	"I Think I Love You"	Safe
Nadia Turner	"Time After Time"	Bottom two
Mikalah Gordon	"Love Will Lead You Back"	Eliminated
Anwar Robinson	"Ain't Nobody"	Safe
Jessica Sierra	"Total Eclipse of the Heart"	Safe

Non-competition performance
Performers	Song
Top 11	"He Ain't Heavy, He's My Brother"

=== Top 10 – Music from the 1990s (March 29) ===
Contestants are listed in the order they performed.

Contestant	Song	Result
Bo Bice	"Remedy"	Safe
Jessica Sierra	"On the Side of Angels"	Eliminated
Anwar Robinson	"I Believe I Can Fly"	Bottom two
Nadia Turner	"I'm the Only One"	Bottom three
Constantine Maroulis	"I Can't Make You Love Me"	Safe
Nikko Smith	"Can We Talk"	Safe
Anthony Fedorov	"Something About the Way You Look Tonight"	Safe
Carrie Underwood	"Independence Day"	Safe
Scott Savol	"One Last Cry"	Safe
Vonzell Solomon	"I Have Nothing"	Safe

Non-competition performance
Performers	Song
Top 10	"Everything Is Beautiful"

=== Top 9 – Classic Broadway (April 5) ===
Contestants are listed in the order they performed.

Contestant	Broadway song	Musical	Result
Scott Savol	"The Impossible Dream (The Quest)"	Man of La Mancha	Bottom two
Constantine Maroulis	"My Funny Valentine"	Babes in Arms	Safe
Carrie Underwood	"Hello, Young Lovers"	The King and I	Safe
Vonzell Solomon	"People"	Funny Girl	Bottom three
Anthony Fedorov	"Climb Ev'ry Mountain"	The Sound of Music	Safe
Nikko Smith	"One Hand, One Heart"	West Side Story	Eliminated
Anwar Robinson	"If Ever I Would Leave You"	Camelot	Safe
Bo Bice	"Corner of the Sky"	Pippin	Safe
Nadia Turner	"As Long as He Needs Me"	Oliver!	Safe

=== Top 8 – Contestants' birth year (April 12) ===
Contestants performed one song from the year they were born and are listed in the order they performed.

Contestant	Song	Year	Result
Nadia Turner	"When I Dream"	1977	Eliminated
Bo Bice	"Free Bird"	1975	Bottom two
Anwar Robinson	"I'll Never Love This Way Again"	1979	Safe
Anthony Fedorov	"Everytime You Go Away"	1985	Safe
Vonzell Solomon	"Let's Hear It for the Boy"	1984	Safe
Scott Savol	"She's Gone"	1976	Bottom three
Carrie Underwood	"Love Is a Battlefield"	1983	Safe
Constantine Maroulis	"Bohemian Rhapsody"	1975	Safe

Non-competition performance
Performers	Song
Top 8	"When You Tell Me That You Love Me"

=== Top 7 – 1970s dance music (April 19) ===
Contestants are listed in the order they performed.

Contestant	Song	Result
Constantine Maroulis	"Nights on Broadway"	Safe
Carrie Underwood	"MacArthur Park"	Safe
Scott Savol	"Everlasting Love"	Bottom three (Note: Both Scott Savol and Anthony Fedorov were in the bottom three with Anwar Robinson, but it was never revealed which one was in the bottom two.)
Anthony Fedorov	"Don't Take Away the Music"	Bottom three
Vonzell Solomon	"I'm Every Woman"	Safe
Anwar Robinson	"September"	Eliminated
Bo Bice	"Vehicle"	Safe

Non-competition performance
Performers	Song
Top 7	"You Can Shine"

=== Top 6 – Music from the 21st century (April 26) ===
Contestants are listed in the order they performed.

Contestant	Song	Result
Carrie Underwood	"When God-Fearin' Women Get the Blues"	Safe
Bo Bice	"I Don't Want to Be"	Safe
Vonzell Solomon	"I Turn to You"	Bottom three
Anthony Fedorov	"I Surrender"	Bottom two
Constantine Maroulis	"How You Remind Me"	Eliminated
Scott Savol	"Dance with My Father"	Safe

Non-competition performance
Performers	Song
Top 6	"Emotion"

=== Top 5 – Leiber and Stoller and Billboard current chart (May 3) ===
Each contestant performed two songs: one written by songwriting duo Jerry Leiber and Mike Stoller, and one from the Billboard current chart. Contestants are listed in the order they performed.

Contestant	Order	Song	Result
Anthony Fedorov	1	"Poison Ivy"	Bottom two
Anthony Fedorov	6	"Incomplete"	Bottom two
Scott Savol	2	"On Broadway"	Eliminated
Scott Savol	7	"Everytime You Go Away"	Eliminated
Vonzell Solomon	3	"Treat Me Nice"	Safe
Vonzell Solomon	8	"When You Tell Me That You Love Me"	Safe
Bo Bice	4	"Stand by Me"	Safe
Bo Bice	9	"Heaven"	Safe
Carrie Underwood	5	"Trouble"	Safe
Carrie Underwood	10	"Bless the Broken Road"	Safe

Non-competition performance
Performers	Song
Top 5	"Bridge over Troubled Water"

=== Top 4 – Country & Gamble and Huff (May 10) ===
Each contestant performed two songs and are listed in the order they performed.

Contestant	Order	Country song	Result
Carrie Underwood	1	"Sin Wagon"	Safe
Carrie Underwood	5	"If You Don't Know Me by Now"	Safe
Bo Bice	2	"It's a Great Day to Be Alive"	Safe
Bo Bice	6	"For the Love of Money"	Safe
Vonzell Solomon	3	"How Do I Live"	Bottom two
Vonzell Solomon	7	"Don't Leave Me This Way"	Bottom two
Anthony Fedorov	4	"I'm Already There"	Eliminated
Anthony Fedorov	8	"If You Don't Know Me by Now"	Eliminated

Non-competition performance
Performers	Song
Top 4	"Islands in the Stream"

=== Top 3 (May 17) ===
Each contestant performed three songs: one chosen by Clive Davis, one chosen by one of the judges, and one chosen by themselves. Contestants are listed in the order they performed.

Simon Cowell believed that Bo Bice would have won had he able to save his a cappella rendering of "In a Dream" for his final performance.

Contestant	Order	Song	Result
Vonzell Solomon	1	"I'll Never Love This Way Again" (Note: Song chosen by Clive Davis)	Eliminated
Vonzell Solomon	4	"Chain of Fools"	Eliminated
Vonzell Solomon	7	"On the Radio" (Note: Song chosen by Simon Cowell)	Eliminated
Bo Bice	2	"Don't Let the Sun Go Down on Me"	Safe
Bo Bice	5	"In a Dream"	Safe
Bo Bice	8	"(I Can't Get No) Satisfaction" (Note: Song chosen by Paula Abdul)	Safe
Carrie Underwood	3	"Crying"	Safe
Carrie Underwood	6	"Making Love Out of Nothing at All"	Safe
Carrie Underwood	9	"Man! I Feel Like a Woman!" (Note: Song chosen by Randy Jackson)	Safe

=== Top 2 – Finale (May 24) ===
Each contestant performed three songs and are listed in the order they performed.

Contestant	Order	Song	Result
Bo Bice	1	"Long, Long Road"	Runner-up
Bo Bice	3	"Vehicle"	Runner-up
Bo Bice	5	"Inside Your Heaven"	Runner-up
Carrie Underwood	2	"Inside Your Heaven"	Winner
Carrie Underwood	4	"Independence Day"	Winner
Carrie Underwood	6	"Angels Brought Me Here"	Winner

Non-competition performances
Performers	Song
Top 12 (Note: Carrie Underwood and Bo Bice were not a part of this group performance.)	"Fun, Fun, Fun" "Barbara Ann" "In My Room" "Surfer Girl" "I Get Around" "Good Vibrations"
Bo Bice	"Vehicle"
Carrie Underwood	"Angels Brought Me Here"
Carrie Underwood and Bo Bice	"Up Where We Belong"
Carrie Underwood with Rascal Flatts	"Bless the Broken Road"
Anthony Fedorov and Anwar Robinson with Kenny G	"I Believe I Can Fly"
Constantine Maroulis, Jessica Sierra, and Nadia Turner with Kenny Wayne Shepherd	"Walk This Way"
Scott Savol and Nikko Smith with George Benson	"On Broadway"
Vonzell Solomon with Billy Preston	"With You I'm Born Again"
Lindsey Cardinale and Mikalah Gordon with Babyface	"Every Time I Close My Eyes"
Bo Bice with Lynyrd Skynyrd	"Sweet Home Alabama"
Carrie Underwood	"Inside Your Heaven"

== Elimination Chart ==
Color key:

Winner
Runner-up
Saved by the public
Bottom two or three
Withdrew from competition
Eliminated

American Idol (season 4) – Eliminations
Contestant	Pl.	Top 24			Top 12	Top 11 (Note: Owing to a mix-up during the March 22 performance show, American Idol did not eliminate a contestant on the Wednesday results show, and instead conducted a full revote. Mikalah Gordon was eliminated on Thursday, March 24.)	Top 10	Top 9	Top 8	Top 7	Top 6	Top 5	Top 4	Top 3	Finale
Contestant	Pl.	2/23	3/2	3/9	3/16	3/24	3/30	4/6	4/13	4/20	4/27	5/4	5/11	5/18	5/25
Carrie Underwood	1	Safe	Safe	Safe	Safe	Safe	Safe	Safe	Safe	Safe	Safe	Safe	Safe	Safe	Winner
Bo Bice	2	Safe	Safe	Safe	Safe	Safe	Safe	Safe	Bottom two	Safe	Safe	Safe	Safe	Safe	Runner-up
Vonzell Solomon	3	Safe	Safe	Safe	Safe	Safe	Safe	Bottom three	Safe	Safe	Bottom three	Safe	Bottom two	Eliminated	
Anthony Fedorov	4	Safe	Safe	Safe	Safe	Bottom three	Safe	Safe	Safe	Bottom three	Bottom two	Bottom two	Eliminated		
Scott Savol	5	Safe	Safe	Safe	Safe	Safe	Safe	Bottom two	Bottom three	Bottom three	Safe	Eliminated			
Constantine Maroulis	6	Safe	Safe	Safe	Safe	Safe	Safe	Safe	Safe	Safe	Eliminated				
Anwar Robinson	7	Safe	Safe	Safe	Safe	Safe	Bottom two	Safe	Safe	Eliminated					
Nadia Turner	8	Safe	Safe	Safe	Safe	Bottom two	Bottom three	Safe	Eliminated						
Nikko Smith	9	Safe	Safe	Eliminated (Note: Nikko Smith was originally eliminated in the semifinal round, but was brought back after Mario Vasquez withdrew from the competition.)	Safe	Safe	Safe	Eliminated							
Jessica Sierra	10	Safe	Safe	Safe	Bottom three	Safe	Eliminated								
Mikalah Gordon	11	Safe	Safe	Safe	Bottom two	Eliminated									
Lindsey Cardinale	12	Safe	Safe	Safe	Eliminated										
Mario Vazquez		Safe	Safe	Safe	Withdrew (Note: Mario Vazquez withdrew from the competition for personal reasons.)										
Amanda Avila		Safe	Safe	Eliminated											
Janay Castine		Safe	Safe	Eliminated											
Travis Tucker		Safe	Safe	Eliminated											
David Brown		Safe	Eliminated												
Aloha Mischeaux		Safe	Eliminated												
Joseph Murena		Safe	Eliminated												
Celina Rae		Safe	Eliminated												
Judd Harris		Eliminated													
Melinda Lira		Eliminated													
Sarah Mather		Eliminated													
Jared Yates		Eliminated													

== Controversies ==
During the season, Corey Clark, a second season contestant who was disqualified for having an undisclosed arrest record, alleged in an interview on ABC's Primetime Live that he had had an affair with Paula Abdul while on the show.

During the top 11 competition show, three of the contestants had their voting telephone numbers improperly displayed. The Wednesday night show, which was supposed to have been the elimination night, allowed viewers to vote again as the numbers were fixed, and the elimination took place on Thursday.

Bo Bice was revealed to have been arrested on a felony cocaine possession charge in June 2001 in Madison County, Alabama and was also arrested two years later for marijuana possession, public intoxication, and possession of drug paraphernalia. Scott Savol was also revealed to have been convicted of a misdemeanor charge of disorderly conduct for domestic violence. However, no action was taken against either contestant by the show producers because they had revealed their misdemeanors to them in advance.

== U.S. Nielsen ratings ==
The fourth season of American Idol had an overall average viewership of 26.8 million and was the top show for the 2004–2005 TV season. Its Tuesday episodes averaged 27.32 million (ranked first) while the Wednesday episodes averaged 26.07 million (ranked third). It also propelled Fox, for the first time ever, to become the top network in the 18-to-49 demographic for the season.

Episode list

Show	Episode	Air date	Week rank	18-49 rating	Viewers (in millions)
1	"Washington, D.C. Auditions"	January 18, 2005	2	14.0	33.6
2	"St. Louis Auditions"	January 19, 2005	3	11.2	26.7
3	"New Orleans Auditions"	January 25, 2005	1	12.1	28.1
4	"Las Vegas Auditions"	January 26, 2005	2	11.2	26.6
5	"Cleveland & Orlando Auditions"	February 1, 2005	3	11.9	28.5
6	"San Francisco Auditions"	February 2, 2005	4	10.9	26.2
7	"Hollywood Week: Part 1"	February 8, 2005	1	12.0	28.8
8	"Hollywood Week: Part 2"	February 9, 2005	3	11.4	26.1
9	"Hollywood Week: Part 3"	February 15, 2005	2	11.5	27.1
10	"Hollywood Week: Part 4"	February 16, 2005	3	11.5	26.3
11	"Top 12 Men Perform"	February 21, 2005	6	9.9	23.5
12	"Top 12 Women Perform"	February 22, 2005	2	11.5	28.3
13	"Top 24 Results"	February 23, 2005	5	11.3	26.7
14	"Top 10 Men Perform"	February 28, 2005	5	10.1	23.6
15	"Top 10 Women Perform"	March 1, 2005	1	11.0	26.9
16	"Top 20 Results"	March 2, 2005	4	10.3	24.3
17	"Top 8 Men Perform"	March 7, 2005	4	10.1	23.9
18	"Top 8 Women Perform"	March 8, 2005	2	11.7	27.7
19	"Top 16 Results"	March 9, 2005	3	11.7	26.9
20	"Top 12 Perform"	March 15, 2005	1	11.5	28.4
21	"Top 12 Results"	March 16, 2005	2	10.8	24.7
22	"Top 11 Perform"	March 22, 2005	1	11.6	27.6
23	"Top 11 Finalists Repeat Special"^{(1)}	March 23, 2005	3	9.0	20.9
24	"Top 11 Results"	March 24, 2005	4	8.6	20.2
25	"Top 10 Perform"	March 29, 2005	2	11.0	26.4
26	"Top 10 Results"	March 30, 2005	3	10.6	24.9
27	"Top 9 Perform"	April 5, 2005	2	10.0	24.5
28	"Top 9 Results"	April 6, 2005	3	10.2	24.1
29	"Top 8 Perform"	April 12, 2005	2	10.7	25.6
30	"Top 8 Results"	April 13, 2005	4	10.8	25.0
31	"Top 7 Perform"	April 19, 2005	2	9.8	24.1
32	"Top 7 Results"	April 20, 2005	4	9.8	22.7
33	"Top 6 Perform"	April 26, 2005	2	10.8	25.5
34	"Top 6 Results"	April 27, 2005	4	10.5	24.4
35	"Top 5 Perform"	May 3, 2005	4	9.9	24.4
36	"Top 5 Results"	May 4, 2005	3	10.8	25.4
37	"Top 4 Perform"	May 10, 2005	4	10.2	24.7
38	"Top 4 Results"	May 11, 2005	1	11.5	26.6
39	"Top 3 Perform"	May 17, 2005	5	10.4	25.0
40	"Top 3 Results"	May 18, 2005	4	11.8	27.9
41	"Special: The World's Worst Auditions"	May 19, 2005		4.0	
42	"Top 2 Perform"	May 24, 2005	2	11.6	28.1
43	"American Idol Season 4 Finale"	May 25, 2005	1	12.5	30.3

Note 1: The Top 11 Wednesday night was a repeat performance night due to a mix-up in the phone numbers for the contestants. The result show was moved to Thursday.

== Music releases ==
The compilation album for the season was performed by the top twelve finalists.

Information
American Idol Season 4: The Showstoppers
- Released: May 17, 2005
- Label: RCA Records
- Chart positions: 6 (Billboard 200)
- RIAA Certification: Gold
- U.S. sales: 332,000

== Related programming ==
- American Idol Rewind (season 4)

Episodes of the fourth season were shown in syndication as American Idol Rewind, paired with season 3 as part of the third edition of American Idol Rewind. Because of limitations after cutting off most of season 3 for reasons beyond control, each episode doubles the weekly top performances, plus there is a special episode about this season’s winner.

== See also ==
- American Idols LIVE! Tour 2005
