= Mikalah Gordon =

American singer

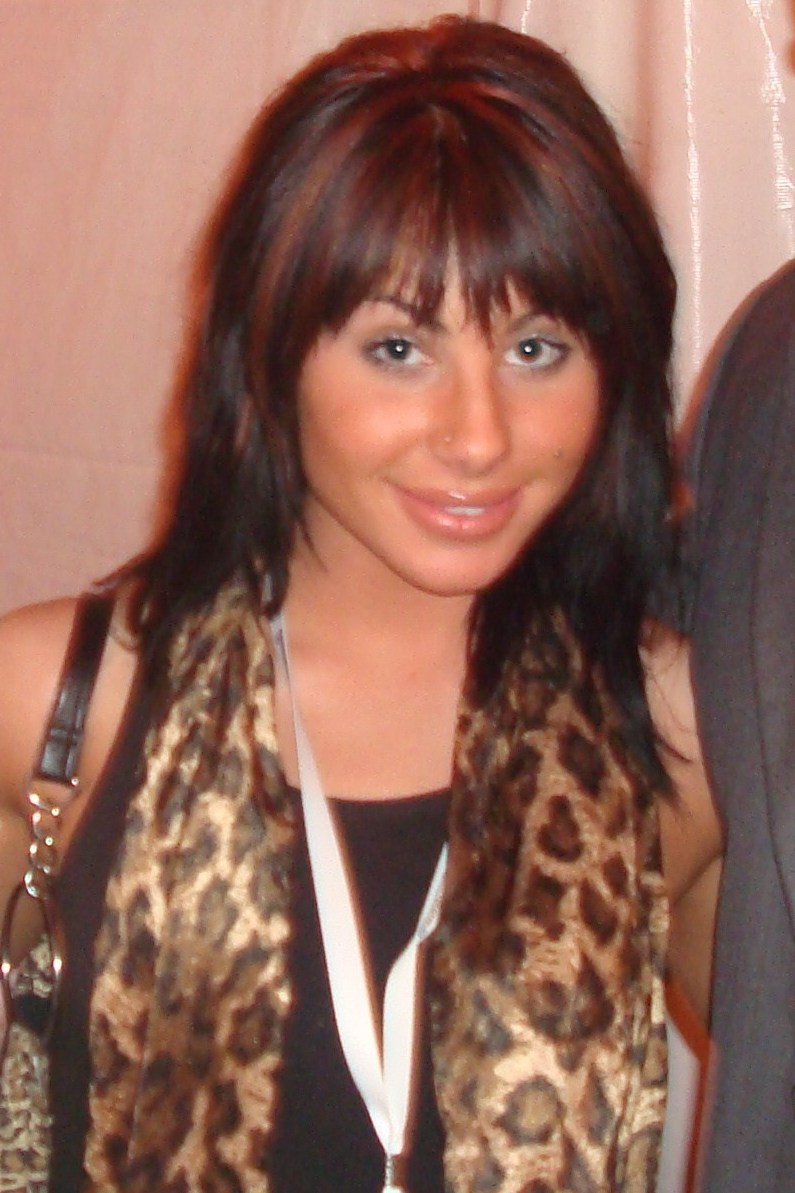
- Gordon in 2008

Background information
- Born: Mikalah Analise Gordon; January 14, 1988 (age 38); Las Vegas, Nevada, U.S.
- Genres: Pop, rock
- Occupations: Singer, television personality
- Years active: 2005–present
- Website: mikalahgordon.com

Mikalah Analise Gordon (born January 14, 1988) is an American singer and eleventh-place finalist on the fourth season of American Idol. She was the second finalist eliminated in March 2005.

== Early life ==
Gordon was born in Las Vegas, Nevada, the same city as her American Idol audition. Her mother, Victoria Cavaricci, is Italian American, and her father, Rocky Gordon, is Italian and Jewish. Gordon was raised Catholic and attended St. Francis de Sales Roman Catholic School from 3rd to 8th grade. During her formative years Gordon regularly performed on stage with her father, a jazz musician who mentored his daughter, attempting to improve her versatility. Before Idol, she was with the Helen Joy Young Entertainers, sang at the White House, and worked at an oxygen bar.

== American Idol ==
Gordon was eliminated during "Billboard #1 Hits" week, on the March 24 show. This was also the week when the show mixed up the voting numbers for three of the Top 11 contestants, Anwar Robinson, Jessica Sierra and Gordon herself. Her last song on the show was a rendition of "Love Will Lead You Back" by Taylor Dayne.

Week #	Song	Original artist	Result
Top 24	Young Hearts Run Free	Candi Staton	Safe
Top 20	God Bless the Child	Billie Holiday	Safe
Top 16	Somewhere	Cast of West Side Story	Safe
Top 12	Son of a Preacher Man	Dusty Springfield	Bottom 2
Top 11	Love Will Lead You Back	Taylor Dayne	Eliminated

== Post-American Idol career ==
Gordon returned to American Idol as a host for the pre-show on the fourth-season finale of American Idol, sang during the beginning medley of The Beach Boys' songs and another song with finalist Lindsey Cardinale and Babyface.

Gordon played Brianna on Living with Fran. Following an appearance on the February 24, 2006 episode of The Tyra Banks Show, Tyra Banks hired her as a Tyra Show correspondent. Gordon was a co-host of American Idol Extra for the first two seasons. On April 6, 2007, Gordon posed as an "American Idol Finalist" on Identity.

Gordon played Lila Lee, a country singer on a USO tour in Iraq under the watch of The Unit, episode "M.P.s" on October 30, 2007. She was at the American Idol season finale visiting David Cook's hometown, cheering and talking to the crowd in 2008 and performed the same activities in Kris Allen's hometown in 2009.

Gordon lives in Los Angeles, California. She was a contestant on the second season of Gone Country. During the show, she wrote a song called "You're Ugly When You're Drunk" which she performed in the finale. Gordon can now be seen in multiple venues throughout the Los Angeles area weekly, performing standup comedy and singing.

Gordon released her first single, "Honey", on July 23, 2013. Gordon performed in residency at Rose Rabbit Lie, a night club located inside the Cosmopolitan of Las Vegas until 2018.

As of April 2023, Gordon hosts the Totally Weird and Funny Videos show She created a weekly podcast , So Funny It Hurts, where she interviews comedians about the trauma and mental health journey that has helped shape them today. Guests have included Perez Hilton, Michael Yo and, Jamie Kennedy.

Gordon has a performance residency with her own band in the Nowhere Lounge at the Fontaine Bleu Hotel in Las Vegas.
