= Still Green =

- Theatrical release poster
- Directed by: Jon Artigo
- Written by: Georgia Menides
- Produced by: Georgia Menides; Doug Lloyd; Andrea Ajemian
- Starring: Sarah Jones; Ryan Kelley; Douglas Spain; Noah Segan; Paul Costa; Brandon Meyer; Ashleigh Snyder; Michael Strynkowski; Nicole Komendat; Gricel Castineira; Vonzell Solomon
- Cinematography: Brian Crane
- Edited by: Jon Artigo; Doug Lloyd; Georgia Menides
- Production companies: Uncovered Productions; Artigo/Ajemian Films
- Distributed by: Osiris Entertainment
- Release date: October 8, 2007
- Running time: 89 minutes
- Country: United States
- Language: English

Still Green is an American drama film directed by Jon Artigo, written by Georgia Menides, produced by Menides, Doug Lloyd, and Andrea Ajemian, and starring Sarah Jones, Ryan Kelley, Douglas Spain, Noah Segan, Paul Costa, Brandon Meyer, Ashleigh Snyder, Michael Strynkowski, Nicole Komendat and Gricel Castineira. The film also features American Idol finalist Vonzell Solomon in her acting debut. It was shot throughout Southwest Florida, including Bonita Beach, Naples, and Port Charlotte. The film was shown at film festivals and was released on DVD on October 13, 2009. Still Green was made by Uncovered Productions and Artigo/Ajemian Films.

== Plot ==
A group of high school graduates rent a beach house the summer before going their separate ways. An accident in the ocean tests their friendship. The teens respond to the tragedy in a way some people find disturbing and others see as a passive act of loyalty. Free-spirited Kerri (Sarah Jones) is still coping with the loss of her father, and her mother's refusal to honor his last wish. A recent break-up has unearthed these feelings, triggering spontaneous and unhealthy relationships with her friends. Alan (Ryan Kelley) struggles with his conflicting feelings about Kerri and about his girlfriend.

== Cast ==
- Sarah Jones as Kerri
- Ryan Kelley as Alan
- Douglas Spain as Bill
- Noah Segan as Sean
- Paul Costa as Brandon
- Brandon Meyer as Daneck
- Ashleigh Snyder as Monica
- Michael Strynkowski as George
- Nicole Komendat as Amanda
- Gricel Castineira as Lisa
- Vonzell Solomon as Chelsea

== Soundtrack ==
The soundtrack of Still Green was released in 2007. It featured alternative rock music from various artists, such as Bishop Allen, Jump, Orange Island, and the Curtain Society.

=== Track listing ===
No.	Title	Music	Length
1.	"Busted Heart"	Bishop Allen	3:51
2.	"Learning Curve"	Waiting For Sully	3:56
3.	"Daylight"	Jump	5:25
4.	"Pyretic Eyes (The Same Soap Opera)"	Orange Island	5:33
5.	"Bishop Allen Drive"	Bishop Allen	2:54
6.	"Steak Knife"	Steve Hit Mike	2:12
7.	"Gone"	Silka Tobias	3:30
8.	"Sunday Mourning"	Mike Martin	3:35
9.	"Blue Sky"	Hank Marley	2:57
10.	"Krush"	BoyGirl	3:40
11.	"What Label"	Future Joyner	4:03
12.	"Slowberry"	The Curtain Society	4:02
13.	"Still Green"	Steve Mayone	2:47
14.	"Fears"	Jediah	6:01
Total length:			54:26

== Reception ==
The film a received positive review in the Telegram & Gazette.
