= Anthony Fedorov =

American singer and actor

Anthony Fedorov Анатолий Фёдоров
- Born: Anatoliy Vladimirovich Fedorov; May 4, 1985 (age 41); Yalta, Ukrainian SSR, Soviet Union (now Ukraine)
- Origin: Trevose, Pennsylvania, U.S.
- Occupations: Musician; singer; actor
- Years active: 2004–present
- Label: Airgo Music

Anthony Fedorov (born Anatoliy Vladimirovich Fedorov (Note: Russian: Анатолий Владимирович Фёдоров, romanized: Anatoly Vladimirovich Fyodorov), born May 4, 1985) is an American singer and actor who is former lead singer for the Chicago band 7th Heaven. He rose to fame as the fourth place finalist on the fourth season of American Idol.

== Biography ==
=== Early life and career beginnings ===
Fedorov was born in Yalta, Ukrainian SSR, Soviet Union (now Ukraine). He, his parents, and his older brother Denis moved to the United States in 1994. He had a tracheotomy as a toddler due to a birth defect in his windpipe, from which a scar is still visible. Despite skepticism that he would even be able to talk again, he persevered and began singing at an early age. He is a tenor and can play the piano and guitar. He graduated from Neshaminy High School in 2003 and attended Bucks County Community College.

Fedorov is fluent in Russian and English. He can also sing in Spanish and Italian.

=== American Idol ===
Fedorov was an American Idol contestant during the spring 2005 season. Of all the American Idol auditioners, Fedorov was most well known for singing ballads, something which all three judges view as his best style.

Fedorov was voted off the show on May 11, 2005, after singing "I'm Already There" by Lonestar and "If You Don't Know Me By Now" by Harold Melvin & the Blue Notes during country music/Gamble and Huff week. It is said by many that his rendition of "If You Don't Know Me By Now" was one of his top performances, having been on-key through the entire song and gaining praise from the judges. It was viewed as one of his most accomplished, along with his presentations of Celine Dion's "I Surrender" and Paul Young's "Every Time You Go Away".

==== American Idol performances ====
Week	Theme	Song sung	Artist	Order sung	Status
Top 24 (12 Men)	Contestant's Choice	"Hold On to the Nights"	Richard Marx	3	Advanced
Top 20 (10 Men)	Contestant's Choice	"I Want to Know What Love Is"	Foreigner	9	Advanced
Top 16 (8 Men)	Contestant's Choice	"I've Got You"	Marc Anthony	3	Advanced
Top 12	1960s	"Breaking Up Is Hard to Do"	Neil Sedaka	6	Safe
Top 11	Billboard No. 1	"I Knew You Were Waiting (For Me)"	Aretha Franklin; George Michael	1	Bottom 3
Top 10	1990s	"Something About the Way You Look Tonight"	Elton John	7	Safe
Top 9	Classic Broadway	"Climb Ev'ry Mountain"	The Sound of Music	5	Safe
Top 8	Year they Were Born; 1985	"Every Time You Go Away"	Paul Young	4	Safe
Top 7	1970s Dance Music	"Don't Take Away the Music"	Tavares	4	Bottom 3^{1}
Top 6	21st Century	"I Surrender"	Celine Dion	4	Bottom 2
Top 5	Leiber & Stoller; Current Week Billboard Chart	"Poison Ivy" "Incomplete"	The Coasters; Backstreet Boys	1; 6	Bottom 2^{2}
Top 4	Country Music; Gamble & Huff	"I'm Already There" "If You Don't Know Me by Now"	Lonestar; Harold Melvin & the Blue Notes	4; 8	Eliminated

- ^Note 1 When Ryan Seacrest announced the results for this particular night, Fedorov was among the bottom three contestants, but was declared safe when Anwar Robinson was eliminated.
- ^Note 2 When Ryan Seacrest announced the results for this particular night, Fedorov was in the bottom two but declared safe when Scott Savol was eliminated.

=== After American Idol ===
In June 2006, Fedorov finished in third place as a contestant on a special Reality TV edition of NBC's Fear Factor along with American Idol season 2 finalist Carmen Rasmusen. He also appeared in four episodes of MTV's Little Talent Show – Triple Threat, which aired on September 26, 2006.

Fedorov toured extensively after American Idol, performing in summer festivals, such as the Spiediefest in New York, Misquamicut Beach in Rhode Island, Clark County Fair in Washington, The Stars and Stripes Festival in Mount Clemens, Michigan, and Independence Day Celebration in Silver Springs, Florida, concerts such as Kellogg's 100th Anniversary Concert in Battle Creek, Michigan, and solo concerts in Philadelphia, Long Island, New York, and as part of the CMJ Festival 2011 in New York City.

In April 2007, he toured American Air Force bases in Europe, judging the Military Idol contest and performing.

Fedorov performed in the US tour of the stage production Simply Ballroom, touring across the United States March through April 2008.

In April 2009, he toured with the "Ballroom with a Twist" production across the eastern United States .

He performed the National Anthem for the New York Knicks, the Oakland Raiders, the Seattle Mariners, the Philadelphia Phillies, the Jacksonville Jaguars, the New York Mets and the Los Angeles Dodgers. He also sang "God Bless America" at the Bank of America 500 NASCAR Pre-Race show .

In March 2009 he performed at the BMI Latin Music Awards honoring Gloria Estefan.

In December 2011, Anthony gave a solo concert at The Bitter End in New York City.

=== Musical theater ===
Matt in the off-Broadway production of The Fantasticks starting on May 1, 2007, until the end of July at the Snapple Theater Center in New York City.

He then starred as the title role in Joseph and the Amazing Technicolor Dreamcoat in July 2009 in Oklahoma City Lyric Theater alongside Diana DeGarmo.

He has reprised the role at the 5th Avenue Theatre in Seattle, starting on October 10, 2009.

On May 14, 2010, he played the role of the Prince in the Rodgers & Hammerstein's production of Cinderella in Nashville, Tennessee, which was a benefit concert for the Steven Curtis Chapman's Foundation Show Hope.

From August 5 to 22, 2010, Fedorov played Joseph again at North Shore Music Theatre in Beverly, Massachusetts. He reprised the role of Joseph from December 7, 2010, to January 2, 2011, in St. Paul, Minnesota, at the Ordway.

Fedorov reprised the role of the Prince in the second annual production of Cinderella in Nashville on April 15, 2011.

From March 3 to 14, 2011, in Tokyo, Fedorov starred in the first production of "Joseph and the Amazing Technicolor Dreamcoat" to ever play in Japan. The production schedule was cut short, with remaining performances cancelled, after an 8.9 magnitude earthquake and massive tsunami hit Japan on March 11, 2011.

Fedorov reprised his role as Joseph with new cast members on June 18 and 19, 2011, in King Center, Melbourne, Florida, and then on June 21 to 26, at Atlanta, Georgia's Fox Theater.

From November 18 to 27, 2011, Fedorov played the role of Link Larkin in Hartford Children's Theatre's production of Hairspray in Hartford, Connecticut.

Starting July 11, 2012, Fedorov took over the part of Roger in the off-Broadway production of Rent at the New World Stages in New York City and stayed with the show until it closed in Sept. 2012.

In December 2011, he took part in the "New Voices" concert at the ACT theater in Seattle and in March 2012 – in the Broadway Backwards concert at Broadway's Al Hirschfeld Theatre.

From November 23 to December 30, 2012, he played the part of Rolf Gruber in the Paper Mill Playhouse (Millburn, New Jersey) production of The Sound of Music.

From November 6 to 17, 2013 he was in the ensemble and also an understudy for the male lead in the Miss Saigon production at the North Shore Musical Theater in Beverly, Massachusetts.

From May 31 to June 22, 2014, he played the part of Enjolras in the Les Misérables production at the La Mirada Theatre in La Mirada, California.

=== 7th Heaven ===
On January 1, 2013, it was announced that Fedorov will be replacing Keith Semple as the new lead singer of 7th Heaven. The band is currently playing three to seven shows a week in the Chicago area. Their album Synergy, with Fedorov on lead vocals, was released on June 11, 2013. On August 22, 2013, it was agreed by both parties that they must part ways immediately.

== Discography ==
Fedorov's rendition of "Every Time You Go Away" is on the American Idol Season 4: The Showstoppers compilation.

His original song, "Deep Within My Heart," was included on an "American Idol" compilation disc, which was included with cartons of Dreyer's Ice Cream as part of its "Taste of American Idol" promotion in 2008.

He co-wrote a song "Stand by Me and Fight" for Frankie Negrón's first English-language album, "Independence Day" that came out on September 22, 2009.

On February 14, 2011, it was announced that Fedorov signed with Airgo Music label and a single would be released soon, with the album to follow.

Fedorov's first record, Never Over, was released in July 2011. The initial release is an EP with six original songs, written or co-written by Fedorov. His single, which is called "You're Perfect" was released on June 29, 2011. He said "When people hear it they won't expect to hear what they are going to hear. What people remember me doing on American Idol was ballads, but it has been 6 years and my voice has gotten deeper and has developed a lot of color and a lot of strength. I am really excited to introduce this part of myself. I would say my journey begins on June 29th when we release the single. My record will be released sometime in July, but we will start with the single first. I am really excited about it all."

On June 23, 2014, a single "I Begin Again" co-written by Fedorov and Bill Grainer was released by Jai McDowall. On September 15, 2014, an EP by Auraganix (Anthony Fedorov and Jennifer Paz) was released, containing six songs.

== Filmography ==
In 2011, Fedorov played the role of sailor /insurgent 1 on the Russian languaged short "Katya," which was directed and written by Mako Kamitsuna. The film was screened at various festivals during the year, the Short Shorts Film Festival & Asia, the Palm Springs International Shortfest, the Los Angeles International Short Film Festival, the Kyiv International Film Festival, the BendFilm Festival, the Lucerne International Film Festival, the Orlando Film Festival and the Grand OFF World Independent Film Awards.

== Personal life ==
Two days after Fedorov was voted off the show, his brother was diagnosed with Ewing's sarcoma. Denis Fedorov died in September 2006. Anthony has since become a national spokesperson for the Sarcoma Foundation of America and, in 2008, was appointed to the SFA board of directors.

Following the show, rumors of a relationship between Fedorov and the final winner, Carrie Underwood, dominated discussions of the season. The rumors were sparked by Underwood's reaction to Fedorov's departure, when she sobbed openly and was seen on-screen saying "I love you" to him. Fedorov and Underwood denied the rumors, saying that they had a "brother–sister" relationship. They remained very close for some time after American Idol, with Fedorov accompanying Underwood to the CMA Awards on November 6, 2006. She also visited him on the set of The Fantasticks during his run on the show.

Fedorov became engaged to his girlfriend, stage actress Jennifer Paz, on December 25, 2012. Their son, Julian Paz Fedorov, was born on April 1, 2013.
