= Vonzell Solomon =

American singer

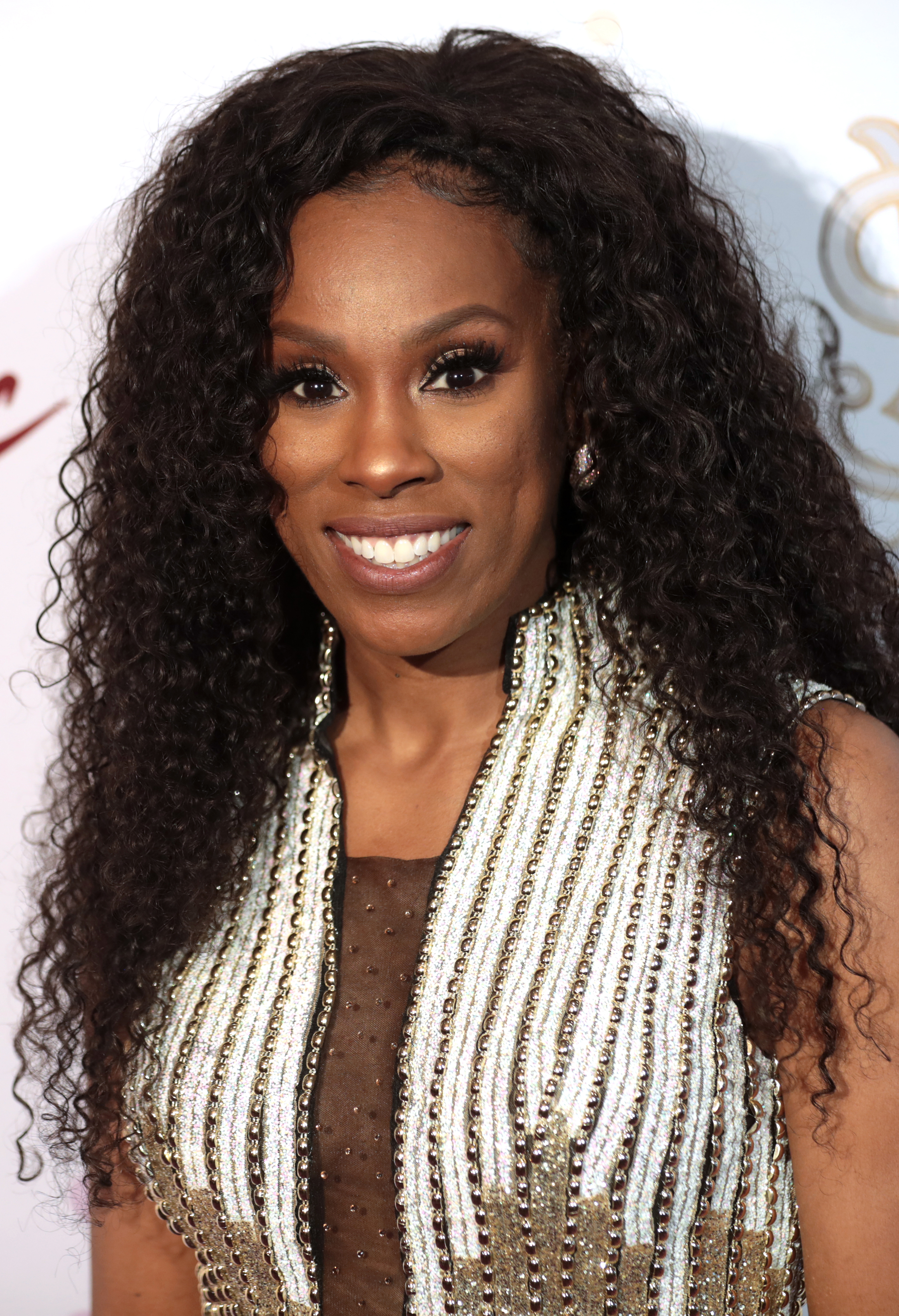
- Solomon in 2022

Background information
- Born: Vonzell Monique Solomon; March 18, 1984 (age 42); Baxley, Georgia
- Origin: Fort Myers, Florida, United States
- Genres: Pop, R&B
- Occupation: Singer
- Instrument: Vocals
- Years active: 2004–present
- Labels: Vonzell, or Baby V Entertainment, formerly known as Melodic Records (CEO)

Vonzell Monique Solomon (born March 18, 1984), nicknamed Baby V, is an American singer who finished in third place in the fourth season of the televised singing competition American Idol. She also appeared in the independent movie Still Green.

== Biography ==
Born in Baxley, Georgia, Solomon's family relocated to Fort Myers, Florida when she was an infant. Her parents are Alice and Larry Goethel; Solomon uses her mother's maiden name professionally. She has one older sister, Zanobra, and two brothers, Kendall and Gabriel.

Solomon attended high school at the Cypress Lake Center for the Arts. She holds a black belt in Sembact martial arts; her father is a martial arts instructor affectionately known as "Master G". Prior to auditioning for American Idol, she worked for the United States Postal Service as a Rural Letter Carrier and sang with local bands in Southwest Florida. In April 2004, she released a demo CD, My Struggle exclusively to her website. It was made unavailable while she was competing on Idol.

In 2002, Solomon auditioned for the second season of P-Diddy's Making the Band, but was not selected for the group. Diddy has stated that he does not recall her, and during an appearance on Live with Regis and Kelly asserted that she was not well suited for a hip-hop group, anyway.

=== American Idol ===
Solomon auditioned for the fourth season of Idol in Orlando, Florida, her second audition for the show, as she had originally auditioned during the second season, but was cut by the producers.

For her Hollywood solo, she performed "How Will I Know" by Whitney Houston.

Of her first performance in the Top 12 (Dionne Warwick's "Anyone Who Had a Heart," February 28, 2005), judge Simon Cowell said Solomon needed to do something memorable to make it far in the competition. The following week, Cowell called her performance of the Emotions' "Best of My Love" her first memorable performance of the competition.

Her performance of Diana Ross's "When You Tell Me That You Love Me" had Randy Jackson say that it was a perfect vocal.

On May 11, 2005, the top 4 remaining Idol contestants each performed two numbers for the themes Nashville Songs and Gamble & Huff Songs. Solomon performed "How Do I Live" and Thelma Houston's "Don't Leave Me This Way." Despite being in the bottom two that week, she made it into the top 3 when Anthony Fedorov was eliminated.

On May 17, 2005, Clive Davis selected Dionne Warwick's "I'll Never Love This Way Again" for Solomon to perform, the judges selected Donna Summer's "On the Radio" and her own choice was Aretha Franklin's "Chain of Fools." She was eliminated on the following night's results show—leaving Carrie Underwood and Bo Bice to battle it out in the finale. She did, however, return for the season finale and performed "With You I'm Born Again" with Billy Preston.

==== American Idol performances ====
Week # - Theme	Song Choice	Original Artist	Result
Audition	"Chain of Fools"	Aretha Franklin	Advanced
Hollywood	Unaired	Unaired	Advanced
Top 75	"How Will I Know"	Whitney Houston	Advanced
Top 24	"Heat Wave"	Martha and the Vandellas	Safe
Top 20	"If I Ain't Got You"	Alicia Keys	Safe
Top 16	"Respect"	Otis Redding	Safe
Top 12 - Songs of the 60's	"Anyone Who Had a Heart"	Dionne Warwick	Safe
Top 11 - Billboard'' #1's	"Best of My Love"	The Emotions	Safe
Top 10 - Songs of the 90's	"I Have Nothing"	Whitney Houston	Safe
Top 9 - Broadway Musicals	"People"	Barbra Streisand	Bottom 3
Top 8 - Contestants' Birth Year	"Let's Hear It for the Boy"	Deniece Williams	Safe
Top 7 - 70's Dance Music	"I'm Every Woman"	Chaka Khan	Safe
Top 6 - Songs of the 21st Century	"I Turn to You"	All-4-One	Bottom 3
Top 5 - Leiber and Stoller Songs and Billboard Top 40	"Treat Me Nice" "When You Tell Me That You Love Me"	Elvis Presley; Diana Ross	Safe
Top 4 - Nashville Songs & Gamble and Huff Songs	"How Do I Live" "Don't Leave Me This Way"	LeAnn Rimes; Thelma Houston	Bottom 2^{1}
Top 3 - Clive Davis', Judges & Contestants' choice	"I'll Never Love This Way Again" "Chain of Fools" "On the Radio"	Dionne Warwick; Aretha Franklin; Donna Summer	Eliminated
Season Finale	"With You I'm Born Again"	Billy Preston (feat. Syreeta)	

- ^Note 1 When Ryan Seacrest announced the results in the particular night, Solomon was in the bottom two but declared safe when Anthony Fedorov was eliminated.

=== Post-American Idol ===
Solomon is the CEO of her independent record label, Melodic Records. Before starting the company, she was the highest-finishing American Idol contestant not to receive a recording contract afterward. She also makes a cameo in the 2007 independent film Still Green, and has served as a paid spokesperson for the United States Postal Service, as she was a rural carrier before her Idol appearances.

In mid-2006, it was announced that Solomon was planning a recording which went into development hell, and not much has been heard about it since. Her representatives claimed that none of the "media's speculations" were true and that they just hit a few bumps along the road. A single from this mostly completed album was scheduled for release in late 2007. My Struggle, recorded under the name "Baby V," was released to iTunes on January 9, 2007.

On May 17, 2007 a fire erupted in Solomon's Fort Myers home. Authorities suspect the cause to be an electrical malfunction in the attic. She was not injured, but damage to the home was estimated at more than $200,000, and a family pet, a small dog, died in the fire. After discovering the fire, she called 911 from a neighbor’s home. The 911 call was received at 11:25 p.m., and firefighters from the South Trail Fire Department had the fire under control at 11:45 p.m.

In June 2008 Vonzell starred as one of the headliners for a live music show in Branson, MO, named "America's Favorite Finalists". The show featured 6 top 12 American Idol Finalists performing their own music, cover songs and group numbers. The show ran at the Grand Palace and was produced by Steve Drummond, America's Favorite Finalists.

Solomon was also seen performing on the Simply Ballroom tour, and appeared at Idol Camp from July 27 - August 2, 2008. Idol Camp is located on Pali Mountain in California's San Bernardino Mountains.

Solomon recently finished a brief stint at the Lubbock Memorial Civic Center in Lubbock, Texas, as Glinda/Aunt Em, in Todrick Hall's retelling of the Wizard of Oz. Oz, the Musical sold out both nights. She starred alongside Season Two alumnus Rickey Smith as the Tinman, and Season 4 alumni Scott Savol, as the Lion, and Mikalah Gordon, as Dorothy.

On June 27, 2012, Solomon made a cameo appearance in the viral YouTube video "Beauty and the BEAT!" alongside Katie Stevens, DeStorm, GloZell Green, Miles Jai, and Antoine Dodson.

She appeared as the female vocalist in the touring cast of Burn the Floor, which began performances October 12, 2010.

In 2015, Solomon appeared Todrick with fellow American Idol alum, Todrick Hall.

In 2018, she has appeared as part of the Postmodern Jukebox touring company.

In 2020, Solomon appeared on Gayme Show as the in-house band vocalist, also singing the show's theme song.

In 2021, Solomon appeared on a song for the sixth season of RuPaul's Drag Race All Stars on the episode "Show Up Queen."

=== Airport situation ===
Security officials detained Solomon on June 10, 2008 at Southwest Florida International Airport when an unloaded gun, which she is licensed to carry, was found in her luggage at a security check-point; Solomon was not arrested and has since completed a pre-trial diversion program . The charge was not pressed.

== Discography ==
Solomon released her first EP, My Struggle, in 2004 on Melodic Records. It was re-released to iTunes on January 9, 2007.

=== My Struggle ===
1. "Gotta Have Faith" - 2:46
2. "My Struggle" - 3:48
3. "Do Ya Thing" - 4:28
4. "B-a-b-y-v" - 2:25
5. "Dance 2nite" - 3:30
6. "You Don't Impress Me" - 3:23
7. "The One I Love" - 4:33
8. "Bye-bye" - 5:36

Solomon's rendition of "Best of My Love" appears on the American Idol Season 4: The Showstoppers compilation. She also appears on the Dear Santa holiday compilation the United States Postal Service produced for Christmas 2005 with a rendition of "O Come All Ye Faithful" with Alicia Keys, Nick Lachey and other artists, and recorded a song for a 2006 Christmas album, Breaking for the Holidays called "It's Gonna Be a Cold Cold Christmas." She was featured in Todrick Hall's "Baby, It's Warm Inside" during Christmas 2010.

On 24 January 2012, Vonzell released her 2010-11 EP True Story to iTunes, which mixes pop, R&B and soul genres.

=== True Story ===
1. "Faithful" - 3:00
2. "Rise Above" - 4:08
3. "Dirt Bag - 4:49
4. "Half a Heart" - 3:06
5. "True Story" - 3:50
6. "We Gone Rock" - 3:47
7. "Love Me" - 3:29
8. "Stronger" - 4:02

== Filmography ==
Year	Title	Role	Notes
2005	Live with Regis	Herself	Aired June 9, 2005
2005	VH1's Big In '05	Herself	Featured artist
2006	The Tyra Banks Show	Herself	Guest appearance
2007	Still Green	Chelsea	Supporting character
2013	Cinderoncé	The Evil Stepmother	Todrick Hall music video
2015	Todrick	Herself	Featured artist
2016	Straight Outta Oz	Ensemble/Various	Visual album by Todrick Hall
2020	Gayme Show	Herself	In-house singer
