= Nikko Smith =

American singer (born 1982)

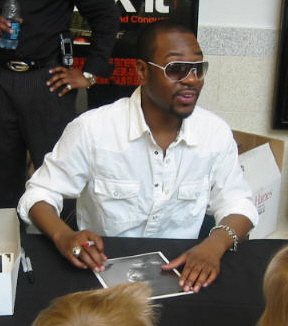
- Nikko Smith in April 2006

Background information
- Born: Osborne Earl Smith Jr. April 28, 1982 (age 43)
- Origin: St. Louis, Missouri, United States
- Genres: R&B, pop
- Occupation: Musician
- Years active: 2005–present
- Labels: The N Music Group
- Website: nikkosmith.com

Osborne Earl "Nikko" Smith Jr. (born April 28, 1982) is a singer-songwriter who was the ninth-place finalist of the fourth season on American Idol.

== Biography ==
Nikko Smith, the son of Baseball Hall of Famer Ozzie Smith, is currently working on an album entitled The Revolution.

On October 26, 2006, Smith performed "The Star-Spangled Banner" prior to Game 4 of the World Series, at the home field of the St. Louis Cardinals for whom his father had played 15 seasons.

=== American Idol ===
Smith auditioned for American Idol in 2005 with the song "All I Do" by Stevie Wonder. Smith made it to the third round of the semi-finals, but was voted off on March 9 along with Travis Tucker.

Days later, Smith got a phone call from the producers asking him to come back in place of Mario Vazquez, who left for "family reasons". After returning, Nikko was dubbed "The Comeback Kid" by judge Paula Abdul after a performance of "One Hand, One Heart". However, in the same week, Nikko was voted off the show, placing ninth overall.

==== American Idol performances ====
Week #	Song	Original artist	Result
Top 24	"Part-Time Lover"	Stevie Wonder	Safe
Top 20	"Let's Get It On"	Marvin Gaye	Safe
Top 16	"Georgia on My Mind"	Ray Charles	Eliminated^{1}
Top 12	"I Want You Back"	The Jackson 5	Safe
Top 11	"Incomplete"	Sisqo	Safe
Top 10	"Can We Talk"	Tevin Campbell	Safe
Top 9	"One Hand, One Heart"	West Side Story	Eliminated

^Note 1 : Nikko was originally eliminated in a semi-finals results show, He was called back after Mario Vazquez withdrew from the show and he replaced Mario on the final 12.
