= Anwar Robinson =

American singer/songwriter/musician

- Born: Anwar Farid Robinson; April 21, 1979 (age 47)
- Origin: Newark, New Jersey, U.S.
- Occupations: Singer, music teacher, actor, songwriter, pianist, producer
- Instruments: Vocals, piano
- Years active: 2001–present
- Website: www.anwarrobinson.com

Anwar Farid Robinson (born April 21, 1979) is an American singer/songwriter/musician. He was the seventh place finalist on the fourth season of American Idol.

After moving with his family from Newark to Montclair, New Jersey in 1994, Robinson attended Montclair High School.

== American Idol ==
In August 2004, Robinson successfully auditioned for season four of Idol in Washington, DC. He proceeded to the Top 12, but was voted off during the 1970s dance music week on April 20, 2005, after his performance of Earth Wind and Fire's "September".

He went on to tour with the Top 10 contestants of season four and sang for over 500,000 people in over forty cities throughout the United States and Canada. He also participated in "Idols In Concert" at the newly built Rrazz Room at San Francisco's Hotel Nikko.

=== Performances on American Idol ===
Week #	Theme	Song choice	Original artist	Result
Top 24 (12 Men)	Contestant's Choice	"Moon River"	Andy Williams	Safe
Top 20 (10 Men)	Contestant's Choice	"What's Going On"	Marvin Gaye	Safe
Top 16 (8 Men)	Contestant's Choice	"What a Wonderful World"	Louis Armstrong	Safe
Top 12	1960s	"A House Is Not a Home"	Dionne Warwick	Safe
Top 11	Billboard Number Ones	"Ain't Nobody"	Chaka Khan	Safe
Top 10	1990s	"I Believe I Can Fly"	R. Kelly	Bottom 2
Top 9	Classic Broadway	"If Ever I Would Leave You"	from Camelot	Safe
Top 8	Songs from Birth Year	"I'll Never Love This Way Again"	Dionne Warwick	Safe
Top 7	1970s Dance Music	"September"	Earth, Wind & Fire	Eliminated

== Post-Idol ==
Robinson took on the role of "Collins" in the 2007–2008 national/international tour of Rent. He starred as Jesus in the Syracuse Stage production of Godspell that ran from November 25 to December 28, 2008.

He made his film debut in The Ski Trip 2: Friends and Lovers as "Owen".

On October 19, 2009, Robinson participated in a salute to Michael Jackson in "Don't Stop Til You Get Enough: Broadway Salutes The King of Pop" at New York City's legendary Birdland.

Robinson's debut album, Everything, was released on January 25, 2011.

== Charity work ==
On March 2, 2010, Robinson joined Michelle Williams, Musiq Soulchild, Lil' Mo, Tye Tribbett, Nikki Ross & Anaysha Figueroa (both of Kirk Franklin), Nancey Jackson-Johnson, and James Hall under the executive production of Kim Burrell to record "Prayer Song" for Hope for Haiti, composed by Krishnar Lewis. In October 2010, he participated with Yolanda Adams in the Plainfield, New Jersey event where community leaders were trying to break the Guinness World Records for the largest gospel chorus in the world.

== Discography ==
=== Albums ===
- Everything (2011)
