= Jessica Sierra =

American musician

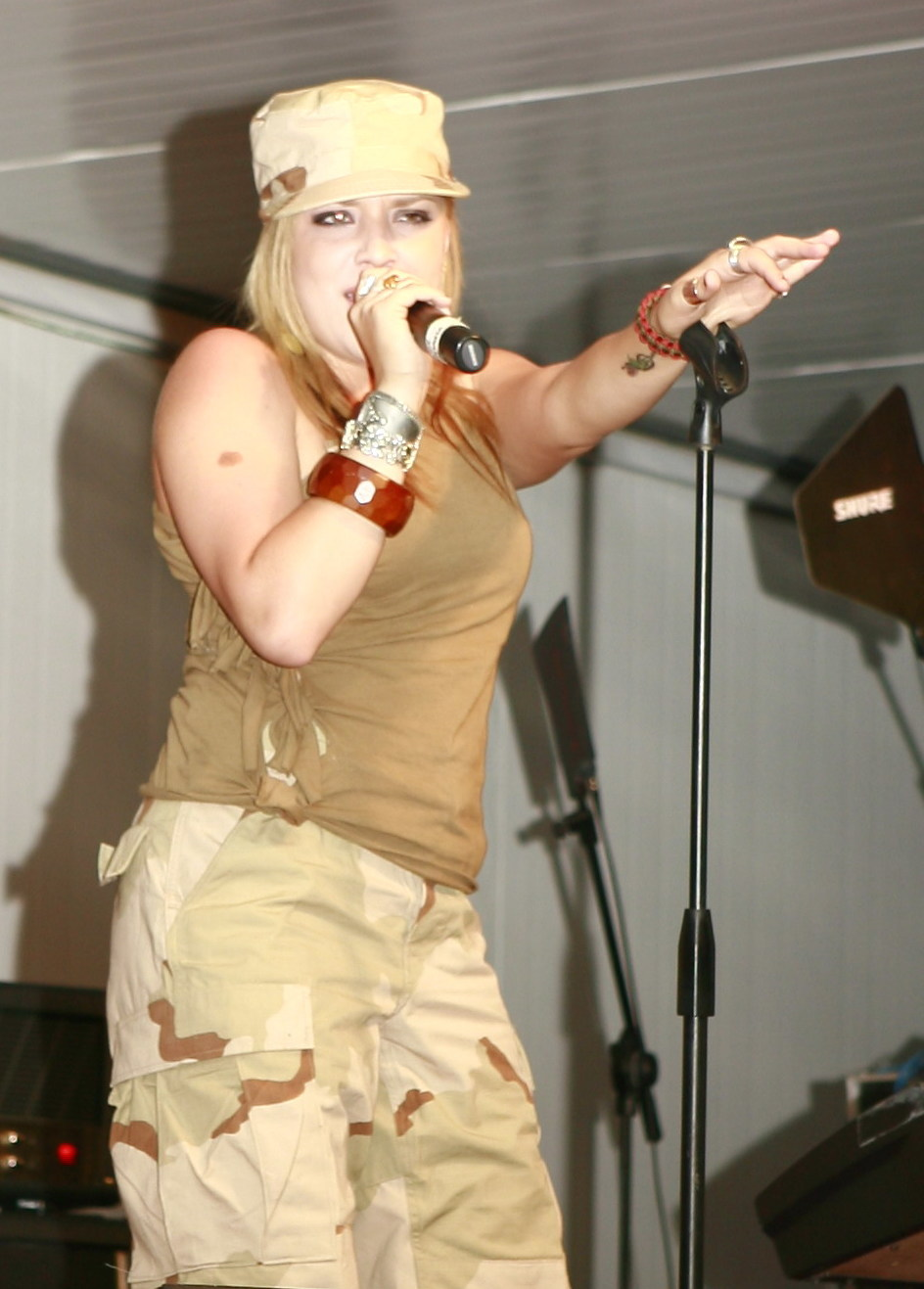

Background information
- Born: Jessica Ann Sierra; November 11, 1985 (age 40)
- Genres: Pop, country
- Occupation: Singer
- Instrument: Vocals
- Years active: 2005–2012
- Labels: Verge (2006–2010); Elite B Records (2010)
- Website: www.jessicasierra.com

Jessica Ann Sierra (born November 11, 1985) is an American former singer and was the tenth-place finalist on the fourth season of American Idol. She was the third finalist eliminated, on March 30, 2005. Sierra released her single Enough in October 2010, from her shelved debut album Rebound.

== Career ==
Sierra was a contestant on Star Search before auditioning for American Idol. She first auditioned for Idol in the second season, but was rejected.

Sierra auditioned in Orlando for the fourth season of American Idol. She was eliminated on March 30, during 1990s music week after she sang LeAnn Rimes's "On the Side of Angels", surprising some fans since Simon Cowell had previously stated that she was one of the strongest female vocalists in the competition.

== American Idol performances ==
Week #	Song choice	Original artist	Result
Audition	At Last	Etta James	Advanced
Top 24	Against All Odds (Take a Look at Me Now)	Phil Collins	Advanced
Top 20	A Broken Wing	Martina McBride	Advanced
Top 16	(Boys Are) Back in Town	The Busboys	Advanced
Top 12	Shop Around	The Miracles	Bottom 3
Top 11	Total Eclipse of the Heart	Bonnie Tyler	Safe
Top 10	On the Side of Angels	LeAnn Rimes	Eliminated

== Post Idol ==
After American Idol, Jessica Sierra performed all over the world. She sang at many concerts and private events, including a private event in Kazakhstan. Jessica did concerts for charities such as the Special Olympics, and performed at numerous corporate events including shows sponsored by Kelloggs and Edy's Ice Cream. In July 2006 Jessica visited U.S. soldiers in Iraq and Kuwait, performing six shows for an Independence Day celebration including a July 4 show in Baghdad.

In 2006, Jessica was featured in OK! Magazine and appeared on TV Guide Channel's program Idol Tonight.

=== 2006–2008: First record deal, "Unbroken" and Celebrity Rehab ===
In late 2006, Jessica recorded a song, "Unbroken", for a Toys "R" Us Exclusive CD that came with the purchase of a Sony CD player. It was released as a single in early 2007 on iTunes.

On January 8, 2008, Verge Management released Sierra's Deepest Secret EP on iTunes, Amazon.com, and Rhapsody. On March 14, 2008, Sierra's Deepest Secret EP was made available in CD format via her official website: http://www.jessicasierra.com/. On March 15, 2008, Jessica's video for her single "Unbroken" was released. "Unbroken" is the song that Jessica sang on VH1 Celebrity Rehab with Dr. Drew.

Sierra exited Verge records shortly after Celebrity Rehab, and signed with a new record label for her upcoming debut album. "Unbroken" was the only single released with Verge.

=== 2010–2012: new label, release of Rebound ===
In 2010, Sierra signed with a new record label called Elite B Records and released her new single "Enough" and released the music video online in October 2010, but it did not chart. Her debut album Rebound was due to be released in December 2010. In January 2011, after her album was not released she stated that it had been pushed back for a 2011 release to finish some songs. The album was never released.

== Personal life ==
As of 2011, Sierra was a resident of Vacaville, California. She is a mother of two sons named Kayden Cash and Sebastian Evans.

=== Stalking incident ===
A 59-year-old man from California was arrested on January 17, 2006 at the home of Sierra's grandmother. Tampa police reported that Daniel Young left at least 40 voice mail messages telling Sierra that he loved her and was willing to go to jail for her. Sierra was a spokesperson for the United States Department of Justice's National Stalking Resource Center, and was featured in a national campaign to promote awareness of the risks of and remedies for stalking; Diane Stuart, Director of the Office on Violence Against Women, United States Department of Justice, worked with Sierra on this project.

The incident was recalled by Sierra on Investigation Discovery's Stalked: Someone's Watching.

=== Substance abuse and legal issues ===
On April 29, 2007, Sierra was arrested at a Tampa bar after throwing a glass at a fellow bar patron. During her booking, cocaine was found in her purse; she subsequently was charged with assault and possession of cocaine. Prior to her plea and sentencing on these charges, Sierra participated in a VH1 rehab reality show run by Dr. Drew Pinsky of Loveline called Celebrity Rehab with Dr. Drew. The television series, featuring Sierra and eight other celebrities, was filmed during the summer of 2007 and premiered on VH1 on January 10, 2008.

On November 19, 2007, after regular filming on Celebrity Rehab had ended but before the series aired, Sierra pleaded no contest in a Tampa courtroom to the assault and cocaine possession charges. and was sentenced to 12 months' probation. Less than 2 weeks later, on December 1, Sierra was arrested again at a Tampa bar, this time for disorderly intoxication (misdemeanor), resisting arrest without violence (misdemeanor), and violation of her probation. The police report of the incident stated that Sierra was out of control, offered a sexual favor to one of the arresting officers, and vomited in the police car. On January 7, 2008, after spending 39 days in jail without benefit of bond, she was sentenced to time served plus 12 months in rehab at the Pasadena Recovery Center, the same California rehab center where Celebrity Rehab took place, and three additional years of probation. The judge's sentence followed a plea to the court on her behalf from Drew Pinsky, where he stated that while the treatment she received while on the show was not adequate considering her level of addiction, he felt that she would have a better chance of recovery if she participated in a year-long treatment program. As part of her probation terms, instead of a possible ten-year prison stint, Sierra was also prevented from getting within 100 yards of a camera or microphone, a restriction that kept her from participating in the reunion episode of Celebrity Rehab 1 as well as in update interviews for American Idol Season 4's Rewind episodes.

In March 2009, Pinsky stated in interviews and on his Twitter account that he had recently presented Sierra with her one year of sobriety celebration cake and that she was "a new woman". He also noted on his VH1 blog that court-mandated treatment had saved her life.

On April 15, 2009, a Florida judge lifted the media ban restriction on Sierra. It was noted in court that she had tested clean and sober for about a year and a half. On April 29, two years to the date after her initial 2007 arrest, Sierra credited Dr. Drew Pinsky with saving her life in a taped interview.

That same year, Sierra and other alumni of Celebrity Rehab appeared as panel speakers to a new group of addicts at the Pasadena Recovery Center, marking 18 months of sobriety for her. Her appearance was aired in the third season episode "Triggers".

== Discography ==
=== Studio albums ===
- 2011: Rebound (shelved)

=== Singles ===
- 2007: "Unbroken"
- 2010: "Enough"

=== EPs ===
- 2008: Deepest Secret

=== Music videos ===
- 2007: "Unbroken"
- 2010: "Enough"
