= Eating Out (film series) =

- Directed by: Q. Allan Brocka (1, 4, 5); Phillip J. Bartell (2); Glenn Gaylord (3)
- Written by: Q. Allan Brocka (1–5); Phillip J. Bartell (2–5)
- Produced by: Danielle Probst (1); Q. Allan Brocka (2, 4, 5); J.D. Disalvatore (2); Jeffrey Schwarz (2); Phillip J. Bartell (3); Michael Jack Shoel (3–5); Kirk Cruz (3)
- Cinematography: Keith J. Duggan (1); Lisa Wiegand (2, 3); Amanda Treyz (4, 5)
- Edited by: Phillip J. Bartell (1–5); Scott Hatcher (2, 3)
- Music by: Dominik Hauser (1); Cary Berger (2); Boris Worister (2); Meiro Stamm (3–5)
- Production companies: Ariztical Entertainment; Automat Pictures (2); EOSS Productions (2–5); Logo Films (4, 5)
- Distributed by: Ariztical Entertainment
- Running time: 428 minutes
- Country: United States
- Language: English

Eating Out is an American film series consisting of five LGBT-themed sex comedy films, beginning with Eating Out (2004). The series is distributed by Ariztical Entertainment. Simultaneous filming for Eating Out: Drama Camp and Eating Out: The Open Weekend took place in 2011.

== Films ==
- Eating Out (2004)
- Eating Out 2: Sloppy Seconds (2006)
- Eating Out: All You Can Eat (2009)
- Eating Out: Drama Camp (2011)
- Eating Out: The Open Weekend (2011)

== Cast members ==
Character	Film				
Character	Eating Out (2004)	Eating Out 2: Sloppy Seconds (2006)	Eating Out: All You Can Eat (2009)	Eating Out: Drama Camp (2011)	Eating Out: The Open Weekend (2011)
Tiffani von der Sloot	Rebekah Kochan	Rebekah Kochan	Rebekah Kochan	Rebekah Kochan	Rebekah Kochan
Kyle	Jim Verraros	Jim Verraros			
Gwen Anderson	Emily Brooke Hands	Emily Brooke Hands			
Marc Everhard	Ryan Carnes	Brett Chukerman			
Caleb Peterson	Scott Lunsford				
Milkshake Marcy	Natalie Burge				
Joey	Billy Shepard				
Richard	John Janezic				
Professor Winston James	Stafford "Doc" Williamson				
Jamie Peterson	Jillian Nusbaum				
Frank Peterson	Murph Michaels				
Susan Peterson	Martie van der Voort				
Aunt Helen		Mink Stole	Mink Stole	Mink Stole	Mink Stole
Troy		Marco Dapper			
Jacob		Scott Vickaryous			
Octavio		Adrián Quiñonez			
Violet Müfdaver		Jessie Gold			
Allen		James Michael Bobby			
Derek		Joseph Morales			
Shane		Andrew Ley			
Surfer Guy		Nicholas James			
Eric		Todd Mitchell			
Linda		Sarah Lily			
Neil		Michael Serrato		Michael Serrato	
Casey			Daniel Skelton	Daniel Skelton	Daniel Skelton
Zach Christopher			Chris Salvatore	Chris Salvatore	Chris Salvatore
Ryan			Michael E.R. Walker		
Harry			Leslie Jordan		
Lionel			John Stallings		
Tandy			Julia Cho		
Pam			Sumalee Montano		
Candy			James loaiza		
Tabitha			Tabitha Taylor		
Benjamin "Benji" Aaron				Aaron Milo	Aaron Milo
Penney				Lilach Mendelovich	Lilach Mendelovich
Lilian "Lilly" Veracruz				Harmony Santana	Harmony Santana
Andy				Joel Rush	Joel Rush
Jason				Garikayi Mutambirwa	
Dick Dickey				Drew Droege	
Genevieve				Marikah Cunningham	
Matty				Rob Westin	
Roger				Jesse Archer	
Connor				Steven Daigle	
Beau				Ronnie Kroell	
Peter					Michael Vara
Luis					Alvaro Orlando
Pastor					Nicol Paone
Congressman Piel					Chris Puckett
Jayden					Michael King
Brandon					Michael Clifford
Bernard					Geoffrey Dwyer
Mitch					William Brown
Vladimir					Garrett Montoya
Dan					Greg McKeon
