= Eating out (disambiguation) =

Eating Out is a gay-themed American film.

Eating Out may also refer to:

- Eating Out (film series), five LGBT-themed sex comedy films that began with Eating Out
- Eating Out (TV series)
- "Eating out", a slang term for performing cunnilingus
- "Eating outside (of the home)," as in a restaurant
