= Eating Out: All You Can Eat =

2009 film by Glenn Gaylord

- Theatrical release poster
- Directed by: Glenn Gaylord
- Written by: Phillip J. Bartell; Q. Allan Brocka
- Produced by: Phillip J. Bartell; Michael Jack Shoel; Kirk Cruz
- Starring: Rebekah Kochan; Daniel Skelton; Chris Salvatore; Michael E.R. Walker; Julia Cho; John Stallings; Maximiliano Torandell; Sumalee Montano; Christina Balmores; Mink Stole; Leslie Jordan
- Cinematography: Lisa Wiegand
- Edited by: Phillip J. Bartell; Scott Hatcher
- Music by: Meiro Stamm
- Production companies: Ariztical Entertainment; EOSS Productions
- Distributed by: Ariztical Entertainment
- Release dates: July 19, 2009 (Outfest); October 9, 2009 (United States)
- Running time: 81 minutes
- Country: United States
- Languages: English; Thai

Eating Out: All You Can Eat is a 2009 American sex comedy film directed by Glenn Gaylord. It is the third installment in the Eating Out film series. The only returning character from the first two films is Tiffani (Rebekah Kochan), while Mink Stole reprises her role as Aunt Helen from the second film.

== Plot ==
After the funeral of Marc and Kyle (who had been giving one another oral sex in the car until Celine Dion's tour bus collided with theirs while going the wrong way), Kyle's mom Helen (Mink Stole) takes in her nephew, geeky but cute Casey (Daniel Skelton), and gives his number to Tiffani von der Sloot (Rebekah Kochan), Kyle's infamous slutty fag hag friend, who hires him at her salon Nail Me. They venture to the local LGBT center so Casey can volunteer for an upcoming event, and Casey meets Zack (Chris Salvatore), a gorgeous frequent visitor. So Tiffani and Casey set up a phony online profile using the image of Tiffani's buff ex, Ryan... which works fine until the real Ryan (Michael E.R. Walker) shows up. Ryan pretends to be gay to aggravate Tiffani, so he accepts Zack's date, but later bails. Zack finds Casey to talk to, but then finds out that Casey and Ryan had both lied to him. Ryan and Tiffani both wanted to help get Casey and Zack together, so they shut the door and lock them in a room together to talk through it. But the problem was not getting solved, so Ryan, although he is straight, decides to strip and get into a threesome to get Casey and Zack together. Only through some fancy footwork, advice from Aunt Helen and mentor Harry (Leslie Jordan), and a daring sexual escapade can Casey figure out how to set things right and perhaps even find the love he's been seeking.

== Cast ==
- Rebekah Kochan as Tiffani von der Sloot
- Daniel Skelton as Casey
- Chris Salvatore as Zack
- Michael E.R. Walker as Ryan
- Mink Stole as Aunt Helen
- Leslie Jordan as Harry
- John Stallings as Lionel
- Julia Cho as Tandy
- Sumalee Montano as Pam
- Christina Balmores as Candy
- Tabitha Taylor as Tabitha
- Maximiliano Torandell as Ernesto

== Reception ==
On Rotten Tomatoes, Eating Out: All You Can Eat currently holds a 17% 'Rotten' rating based on 6 reviews, making it the second-highest reviewed Eating Out film on the site. The first film holds a 16% and the second holding a 44%.

Neil Genzlinger wrote in The New York Times that "The sex (of which there isn't much) isn't sexy, and the humor isn't funny."
