= Brocka =

Brocka is a surname. Notable people with the surname include:

- Q. Allan Brocka (born 1972), American television and film director
- Lino Brocka (1939–1991), Filipino film director
