= Eating Out 2: Sloppy Seconds =

2006 sex comedy film by Phillip J. Bartell

- Theatrical release poster
- Directed by: Phillip J. Bartell
- Written by: Phillip J. Bartell; Q. Allan Brocka
- Produced by: Q. Allan Brocka; Michael Shoel; J.D. Disalvatore; Jeffrey Schwarz
- Starring: Jim Verraros; Emily Brooke Hands; Rebekah Kochan; Brett Chukerman; Marco Dapper; Mink Stole
- Cinematography: Lisa Wiegand
- Edited by: Phillip J. Bartell; Scott Hatcher
- Music by: Cary Berger; Boris Worister
- Production companies: Ariztical Entertainment; Automat Pictures; EOSS Productions
- Distributed by: Ariztical Entertainment
- Release dates: July 13, 2006 (Outfest); November 24, 2006 (United States)
- Running time: 78 minutes
- Country: United States
- Language: English
- Box office: $37,072

Eating Out 2: Sloppy Seconds is a 2006 American sex comedy film directed by Phillip J. Bartell. It is the sequel to Eating Out (2004) and the second installment in the franchise. Q. Allan Brocka, who wrote and directed the first film, returned to co-write the screenplay alongside Bartell. The film stars Jim Verraros, Emily Brooke Hands, Rebekah Kochan, Brett Chukerman, Marco Dapper, and Mink Stole. Verraros, Hands, and Kochan reprise their roles from the first film as Kyle, Gwen, and Tiffani, while Chukerman replaces Ryan Carnes as Marc. Dapper portrays nude art model Troy, while Stole plays Kyle's mother Helen. Following the first film, Kyle and Marc break up, with both setting their sights on Troy, a nude art model questioning his sexuality. In an attempt to approach him, Kyle pretends to be an ex-gay man and attends meetings at a support group with Troy; conversely, Marc pursues Troy by being his out gay self.

Production on the movie began quickly after the first Eating Out proved to be a financial success. Due to scheduling conflicts, Brocka was unable to return as director, handing the duties to Bartell. The first draft of the screenplay was written by Bartell in January 2006, while succeeding ones were co-written by him and Brock. The ex-gay movement's inclusion in the film stemmed from both writers: Bartell wished to include political themes—believing that comedy can shift one's viewpoint—while Brocka had encounters with such organizations trying to convert him. As Carnes was unavailable, Chukerman, who had previously worked with Bartell, was cast as Marc. The casting of roles such as Troy and Octavio—played by Adrián Quiñonez—proved challenging, particularly due to the sex scenes and nudity involved. Eating Out 2 took 10 days to film in late May.

Following its premiere at Outfest on July 13, Eating Out 2 received a limited release in cinemas in the United States on November 24. It was released on DVD on May 29, 2007. The film's quality, plot, and humor received mixed reactions; its political themes and subplot involving the ex-gay group were praised. Response to the performances was mixed, although Stole was generally praised. Eating Out 2 received attention for the sexualization of its male cast members, with significant attention afforded to Dapper's sex appeal.

== Plot ==
College student Kyle breaks up with his boyfriend Marc, accusing him of flirting with other men. Shortly thereafter Kyle, Tiffani, and Gwen, his friends and classmates, become attracted to Troy, a muscular farm boy from Troy, Illinois, who poses nude for their art class. Troy befriends the group and confides in them that he has slept with both women and men, but is reluctant to embrace any gay feelings. When Troy informs the trio that he would like to attend the campus ex-gay ministry in the hopes of being "fixed", Gwen impulsively tells Troy that Kyle is an ex-gay man. Troy quickly assumes that Tiffani is Kyle's girlfriend. The trio then devise a scheme to have Kyle pretend to be an ex-gay man to get close to Troy, hoping to overcome Troy's inhibitions so Kyle can have sex with him.

Kyle and Troy start attending meetings with the ex-gay ministry, led by Jacob, who proclaims that he is an ex-gay man himself. Marc notices Kyle becoming close with Troy and decides to try to seduce the model himself. Troy eventually succumbs to Marc's advances during Gwen's homoerotic photo shoot, and the two have oral sex. However, halfway through, Marc is feels guilty and realizes he cannot go through with the act, as he still has feelings for Kyle. Troy then overhears Gwen and Marc talking about the entire scheme.

Wanting to get back at the schemers, Troy visits Tiffani and Kyle, who have told him that they have an "arrangement" that allows Kyle to sleep with men. They attempt a threesome, with Troy taking revenge by goading Kyle into performing cunnilingus first. Gwen and Marc storm into Kyle's house after witnessing the debacle through the window, and Troy scolds the group for being so sex-crazed. Troy ultimately concludes that he is bisexual, Kyle admits he was wrong to leave Marc, and the group makes up.

Believing that people like Jacob—whom Kyle had discovered to be closeted and sleeping with Octavio, another member of the ministry—are responsible for causing LGBT individuals' suffering and forcing them back in the closet, the five scheme to out him. During one of the group's meetings, they get Jacob to reveal his sexuality in front of his mother by tricking him into having sex with Octavio in a portable toilet on wheels. Jacob comes out to his mother and flees with Octavio. Troy takes a liking to Tiffani and they start a relationship. Meanwhile, Marc and Kyle get back together after confessing their feelings to each other, and Gwen starts to date a girl experimentally.

== Cast ==
- Jim Verraros as Kyle
- Emily Brooke Hands as Gwen Anderson
- Rebekah Kochan as Tiffani von der Sloot
- Brett Chukerman as Marc Everhard
- Marco Dapper as Troy
- Scott Vickaryous as Jacob Buchanan
- Mink Stole as Helen
- Adrián Quiñonez as Octavio
- Jessie Gold as Violet Müfdaver
- Joseph Morales as Derek

== Production ==
=== Development and writing ===
According to producer Michael Shoel, work on a sequel to Eating Out (2004) began following its success at the box office. Q. Allan Brocka, who wrote and directed the previous film, was unable to return as director because of his commitment to the Logo TV series Rick & Steve: The Happiest Gay Couple in All the World. He reached out to Phillip J. Bartell, who had worked on the original movie as an editor, to help write the screenplay. Bartell wrote the first draft of the script by himself in January 2006. Following its completion, Brocka and Bartell co-wrote later drafts, with the process taking them around three to four months to finish. Eating Out 2 focusing on a gay man pretending to be straight to seduce another man came from Bartell, who wished to invert the first movie's premise where a straight man pretends to be gay to seduce a woman. The film ending with Jacob being outed in front of his mother was due to Bartell's belief that the character deserved "some sort of comeuppance".

Shoel recognized that Eating Out 2 features the Christian right, the anti-gay movement, and the ex-gay movement as prominent themes. Brocka admitted that he had experienced incidents prior to making the film in which members of ex-gay organizations attempted to recruit and convert him. The ex-gay movement's inclusion also stemmed from Bartell's desire to "sneak a little political thoughts and ideas into what is basically known as gaysploitation", believing that humor and comedy has the capacity to change people views on a given topic. During the film's production, Bartell attempted to attend an ex-gay meeting for research, but was unable to find one within an appropriate timeframe.

=== Casting and filming ===
From the beginning of the film's production, the crew was sure that Jim Verraros, Emily Brooke Hands, and Rebekah Kochan would reprise their roles as Kyle, Gwen, and Tiffani. In contrast to the first film, Verraros has a more prominent role in the sequel. Concerning her character, Kochan stated that Tiffani has "become skankier". According to Bartell, Ryan Carnes did not reprise his role as Marc due to budgetary issues; Brett Chukerman, who had previously worked with Bartell in the director's short film Crush (2000), took over the role. Regarding his performance as Marc, Chukerman stated that the character "gets a makeover and a new energy" in Sloppy Seconds. Elaborating on the changes concerning Marc's portrayal, Chukerman argues that while the first film featured Marc simply as the object of Kyle's affections, the sequel depicts him as "more confident and actively involved in all the high jinks". Other additions to the film's cast included Marco Dapper in his first film role as nude model Troy; Mink Stole as Kyle's mother Helen; Scott Vickaryous as Jacob, leader of the ex-gay group; and Adrián Quiñonez as Octavio, one of the group's members.

Bartell described the process of finding an actor for the role of Troy as the "big[gest] search" during casting, with Dapper being among the "third wave" of actors to audition. Bartell stated that finding a fitting actor proved challenging, as they would have to be comfortable playing a gay man, especially one who kisses another man, in a role that featured full-frontal nudity. Dapper, who is straight, admitted to being initially nervous about filming the nude scenes. However, he found them justifiable given their context and his character's status as a nude model. Concerning his involvement in the film, Dapper was warned that playing a gay character could lead to him getting typecast. Despite this, he took the role, citing Bartell and Brocka's belief in him as one of the reasons. Dapper described the cast of Eating Out 2 as "welcoming and easy-going".

Many actors turned down the role of Octavio because of a scene featuring the character having sex with Jacob in a portable toilet. Quiñonez stated he enjoyed the role of Octavio as it gave him the opportunity to portray a "light hearted and fun" character; he also appreciated the film's message that "hypocrisy is present in all forms". Filming for Sloppy Seconds lasted 10 days, which Bartell described as a "very stressful time-frame to work in", and concluded on May 31.

== Release ==
Eating Out 2: Sloppy Seconds premiered at Outfest in Los Angeles on July 13, 2006. It opened on November 24, in one theater in the United States, where it earned $4,394; the film placed 82nd overall, and ninth out the films opening in that weekend. Making $842 on its second weekend, Eating Out 2 managed to place 68th on its third weekend, earning $9,198 across five theaters with an average of $1,839 per theater. Its last screening, in three theaters, occurred during its seventh weekend, where the film finished in 68th place with $8,295. Eating Out 2's total earnings were $37,072, all from the North American box office. It was released on DVD on May 29, 2007. Eating Out 2 became available on Amazon Prime Video in April 2018, as part of a licensing agreement with Outfest.

== Reception ==
Review aggregator Rotten Tomatoes reported an approval rating of 40% based on 15 reviews. Metacritic, which uses a weighted average, gave the film a score of 39 out of 100 based on nine critics, indicating "generally unfavorable" reviews.

The film's overall quality, particularly its plot and humor, were generally criticized. Although Robert Koehler of Variety considered Sloppy Seconds funnier than its predecessor, he still deemed it a "cheapo campy goof". Chicago Sun-Times' Bill Stamets gave the film 1.5/5 stars and argued that it faltered during its dramatic moments. Rob Nelson of The Village Voice critiqued the film's humor and quality, describing it as akin to a soap opera, with San Francisco Chronicle's G. Allen Johnson arguing that Eating Out 2 "rarely rises above the level of a high school skit". Metro Weekly's Sean Bugg gave the film 2/5 stars; while appreciating it for adding "more gay perspectives" to the sex comedy genre, he was critical of its quality, labelling it as a rip-off of American Pie. Michael Wilmington of Chicago Tribune echoed similar views concerning the film's quality, although he did praise Bartell's directing. Kevin Thomas of Los Angeles Times criticized Eating Out 2's plot as ridiculous and a retread of its predecessor; Jeannette Catsoulis of The New York Times also found fault with the plot for its "stunning imbecility".

Some reviewers responded more positively to the film's quality and humor, especially its lighthearted tone. In a positive review, Chicago Reader's Andrea Gronvall considered Eating Out 2 an improvement over the first film, finding it lighter in tone, funnier, and faster-paced. Similarly, Tom Keogh of The Seattle Times praised the film's tone as "playful", while Ben Zipper—an editor for Melbourne Queer Film Festival—highlighted the film's humor, particularly its "one-liners". In more mixed reviews, The Boston Globe's Wesley Morris gave it 2/4 stars, praising the dialogue. Similarly, Slant Magazine's Ed Gonzalez gave it 2.5/4 stars, emphasizing the film's humor as one of its strengths. Neil Cohen, reviewing the film for Echo Magazine, complimented Eating Out 2 for having the "raunchy spirit" of Another Gay Movie but lacking its "utter crassness".

Still of Marco Dapper as Troy. The film received attention from critics for the sexualization of its male cast members, especially Dapper. His muscular physique, sex appeal, and nude scenes were all highlighted.

Reviewers highlighted Eating Out 2's treatment of the ex-gay movement, often acknowledged as one of its most comical elements. Despite his overall criticisms of the film, Koehler complimented its message that any effort to convert LGBT youth to make them heterosexual is doomed to fail. Catsoulis similarly acknowledged the film's prominent theme of showcasing the "fruitlessness of right-wing efforts to reorient gay men", finding scenes involving the group "amusingly dimwitted". Morris also praised the humor concerning the ex-gay group, finding scenes involving it to be a running gag. Keogh found the first scene in Eating Out 2 involving the group to be the funniest in the film, particularly for how the group's members struggle to present themselves as straight and having overcome their same-sex desires.

The film's cast and acting received a mixed response, though Stole was praised. Koehler, Catsoulis, and Nelson all criticized the quality of the performances, the former two particularly finding fault with how the cast recited their lines. Despite their criticisms of the acting, both Koehler and Catsoulis commended Stole's performance, describing her as one of the film's highlights, with the latter stating that she "gives her all as Kyle's ebullient, gay-friendly mother". Johnson and Morris expressed similar sentiments, viewing Stole as the film's best parts. In his positive review, Keogh praised the film's acting, particularly the performances of Stole and Verraros. Gronvall commended the supporting cast, particularly Stole and Scott Vickaryous, whom she found believable as a "conservative zealot determined to 'stop the spread of faggotry'". Alongside Stole, Thomas found Dapper's performance to be charismatic, while Nelson, despite being critical of the film's overall acting performances, praised Kochan's portrayal of Tiffani.

The use of fan service in the film, particularly the sex appeal of Dapper and his physical attractiveness, was emphasized. Johnson acknowledged that Sloppy Seconds is filled with "eye candy", with Cohan declaring the men in Eating Out 2 are more attractive than the first movie, drawing attention to the film's male nudity. HX Magazine's Mark Peikert particularly drew attention to the sex appeal of Dapper, Verraros, Chukerman, and Quiñonez. Much attention was afforded to Dapper's attractiveness and muscular physique, highlighted by many critics: Gonzalez described him as a "hot piece of man meat", Catsoulis as a "molded lump of muscle and tan lines", Keogh as "hunky", and Zipper as "gorgeous and buff". Morris noted that Dapper is the most sexualized cast member in Eating Out 2, with Gronvall describing him as the film's main attraction. Critics also drew attention to Dapper's full-frontal scene, which Nelson highlighted for its length. Bugg praised Dapper's and Chukerman's full-frontal scenes, describing the former as "impressively endowed", while Seattle Gay News' Milton W. Hamlin argued that Dapper's sex appeal and nude scenes—alongside those of Chukerman—make Eating Out 2 "a 'must see'".
