= Lucas Jones =

Fictional character from General Hospital

- General Hospital character
- Van Hansis as Lucas Jones
- Portrayed by: Justin Cooper (1996–1998); Logan O'Brien (1998–2002); C. J. Thomason (2002–2003); Ryan Carnes (2004–2005, 2014–2020, 2024); Ben Hogestyn (2005–2006); Matt Trudeau (2020–2021); Van Hansis (2024–present); (and others)
- Duration: 1989–2006; 2014–2021; 2024–present
- First appearance: August 18, 1989
- Created by: Gene Palumbo
- Introduced by: H. Wesley Kenney (1989); Frank Valentini (2014, 2024)
- Book appearances: Robin's Diary
- Matt Trudeau as Lucas Jones
In-universe information
- Other names: Lucas Stansbury; Lucas Spencer
- Occupation: Trauma surgeon
- Family: Jerome; Jones; Spencer
- Parents: Julian Jerome; Cheryl Stansbury
- Adoptive parents: Tony Jones; Bobbie Spencer
- Stepparents: Nelle Benson
- Half-brothers: Leo Falconeri; Andrew Nero
- Half-sisters: Sam McCall; Carly Corinthos (adoptive); B.J. Jones (adoptive)
- Husband: Brad Cooper (2016–2020)
- Adoptive children: Jonah Corinthos; Wiley Cooper-Jones (illegal)
- Grandfathers: Victor Jerome; Andrew Jones (adoptive); Tim Spencer (adoptive)
- Grandmothers: Cindy Jones (adoptive); Lena Eckert (adoptive)
- Uncles: Evan Jerome; Dino Antoinelli; Frisco Jones (adoptive); Luke Spencer (adoptive)
- Aunts: Tiffany Hill; Ava Jerome; Olivia St. John; Pat Spencer (adoptive)
- Nephews: Danny Morgan; Michael Corinthos (adoptive); Morgan Corinthos (adoptive)
- Nieces: Josslyn Jacks (adoptive); Scout Cain; Donna Corinthos (adoptive)
- First cousins: Kiki Jerome; Avery Corinthos; Anna Donely; Evan Jerome Jr.; Maxie Jones (adoptive); Georgie Jones (adoptive); Lucky Spencer (adoptive); Ethan Lovett (adoptive); Lulu Spencer (adoptive); Valerie Spencer (adoptive)

Lucas Jones is a fictional character from General Hospital, an American soap opera on the ABC network. Introduced in 1989, the character has been portrayed by 13 actors. Twins Kevin and Chuckie Gravino appeared in the role from 1989 to 1994, with Kevin and Christopher Graves pinch-hitting in 1990. Jay Sacane portrayed the role from 1994 to 1996, with Justin Cooper (1996–1998) and Logan O'Brien (1998–2002) acting as his successors in the role. Following O'Brien's exit, the character was rapidly aged when Evan Bonifant assumed the role and was quickly replaced after two months by C.J. Thomason, who exited in 2003. In 2004, the character was re-introduced by Ryan Carnes, who departed the following year and was replaced by Ben Hogestyn. Hogestyn left the role in 2006. In 2013, Carnes reprised the role when Lucas returned to Port Charles. Carnes made an unannounced exit from the role in March 2020; Matt Trudeau assumed the role in November of the same year, and exited in March 2021. Carnes reprised the role a third time when Lucas returned in January 2024 following the death of Bobbie Spencer; later that year, in October, Van Hansis assumed the role when Lucas returned to Port Charles after living in Boston.

Lucas is the adopted son of Dr. Tony Jones and his ex-wife, Bobbie Spencer, the biological son of crime lord Julian Jerome, and Cheryl Stansbury. As an infant, Lucas is at the center of a bitter custody battle between former friends, Bobbie and Tiffany Hill, Cheryl's sister. Under head writer, Robert Guza, Lucas is very close with his adoptive cousins, Maxie and Georgie Jones. In 2005, Lucas became the first character in General Hospital history to earn his Ph.D. After Tony's death in early 2006, the character was written out of the series. In 2013, Lucas became a subject of conversation again when it was revealed that Julian was actually alive, and Lucas is contacted by his new-found sister Sam for a DNA test.

== Casting ==
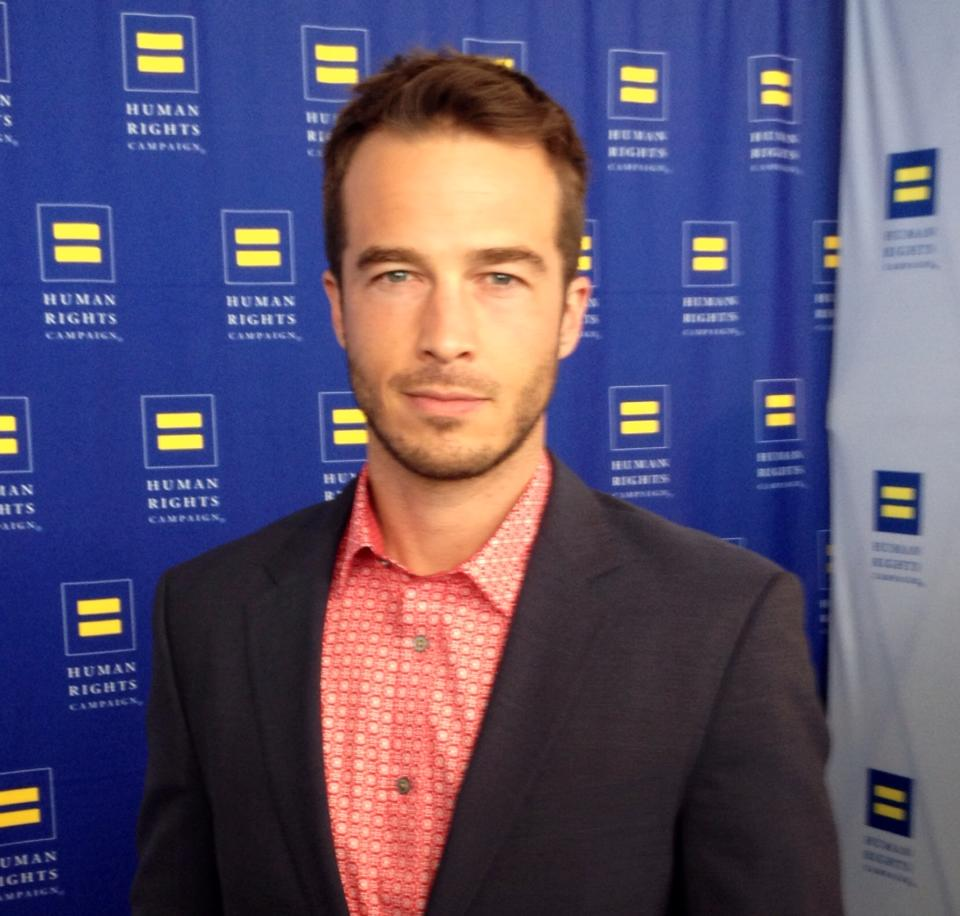
Ryan Carnes was cast in the role in 2004 and departed the following year. He returned in 2014 and departed again in 2020. He resumed the role for two episodes in 2024 when Lucas returned for the memorial of Bobbie Spencer.

The role was briefly played by Nicholas Moody in 1989 upon the character's onscreen birth. The role was portrayed by siblings Kenny and Chuckie Gravino from 1992 to 1994. The Gravino siblings had previously appeared on The Young and the Restless as Phillip Chancellor IV. Jay Sacane appeared in the role from 1994 to 1996. Justin Cooper took over the role from 1996 to 1998. Logan O'Brien stepped into the role in August 1998, leaving the series in 2002. Evan Bonifant stepped into the role on September 6, 2002, when the character was rapidly aged. Bonifant made his final appearance on December 18 and was quickly replaced by C.J. Thomason. Thomason made his debut on December 24, 2002, making his final appearance on June 11, 2003.

In 2004, the role was recast and Ryan Carnes stepped into the role. Ryan Carnes first auditioned for the role in May 2004. Carnes auditioned for a third time on June 2, 2004, and filmed his first scenes on June 16. At the time, Carnes was on vacation in Hawaii when he was called back to California for his final audition. However, his car broke down on the way to his audition. Fortunately, he was able to get a ride with his acting coach. After the audition, Carnes returned to his car and was forced wait another three hours to have his car towed. During his wait, Carnes learned he had booked the recurring role of Lucas with his first air date slated for July 8, 2004.

In 2005, it was announced Carnes would depart the series and would be replaced by Ben Hogestyn, just before Lucas revealed his sexuality. According to TV Guide, Carnes was allegedly fearful of being typecast in gay roles, due to his previous work on television series, Desperate Housewives and the film Eating Out. A representative for the actor claimed Carnes had already planned to leave the series due several upcoming gigs, but chose to vacate the role earlier before the series delved into Lucas's storyline instead of having the role recast in the middle of the story. Carnes last appeared on September 21, and Hogestyn stepped into the role on September 22. Hogestyn, who was only with the show on a recurring status, left in 2006 to pursue a full-time role on The Bold and the Beautiful. According to then-writer Dave Goldschmid, the role was supposed to be recast at some point, but the recast never happened.

Starting on December 4, 2013, through Twitter, Carnes began referencing various locations with the word "Port" in the names. In December 2013, executive producer, Frank Valentini announced to Soaps In Depth that Carnes would reprise the role of Lucas. Following the announcement, Carnes updated his Twitter with the simple message: "Ah, Port Charles, it is!" Carnes filmed his first return scenes on December 11, 2013. His first episode was slated for January 16, 2014, but was pushed back to the following day, due to news coverage. In response to bringing Carnes back to the role, Valentini said it was important to maintain continuity of who had previously played Lucas. Valentini contacted Carnes after casting director Mark Teschner sent him Carnes' audition reel. Head writer, Ron Carlivati said he was the most familiar face, and he also shared a resemblance to William DeVry, who played Julian, "and it just made sense." Carnes said he was quite shocked by the offer to reprise the role. A friend of the actor, who was also a fan of the serial, saw the onscreen events on unfolding and told Carnes that he expected Lucas coming back to the canvas. The casting department contacted Carnes' agent by email and asked if he was interested.

In November 2020, Matt Trudeau assumed the role, following Carnes' exit in March. Trudeau last appeared on March 24, 2021. In December 2023, it was announced Carnes would return to facilitate the memorial of Bobbie Spencer. He appeared on January 10 to 11, 2024.

In September 2024, TV Insider reported the role had been recast with Van Hansis. He made his first episode appearance on October 4 of the same year.

== Development ==
=== Teen years (2002–2006) ===
From 2002 to 2006, Lucas is integrated into a group of younger characters which consist of his adoptive cousins, Maxie (Robyn Richards) and Georgie (Lindze Letherman). Lucas (Thomason) and Georgie even dated briefly in high school, and he took her to prom only for Maxie to ruin their date. Though they were not biologically related, neither pairing caught on with fans. Lucas (Carnes) later dated Brook Lynn Ashton (Adrianne León) while he supported Georgie during her troubled romance with Dillon Quartermaine (Scott Clifton). In late August 2005, TV Guide revealed the series had planned a coming out story for the character of Lucas. With the announcement of Carnes's departure shortly after, a rep said the storyline would be a main focus that would affect the entire canvas. On October 11, 2005 (National Coming Out Day), Lucas announces to Georgie he is gay. The storyline is dropped due to Hogestyn's departure and Lucas is written off canvas in early 2006.

=== Return (2014) ===
In July 2013, General Hospital Happenings reported that Zeman's next visit as Bobbie would bring Lucas home. Though it had yet to be mentioned onscreen, the website said Lucas was now a doctor, and with a recommendation from Dr. Kevin Collins (Jon Lindstrom), he transfers to General Hospital. He was also rumored to share a past with Dr. Silas Clay (Michael Easton). Despite no confirmation from the series, Instinct published a report which stated Lucas had attended medical school in Seattle. The character's return also brings attention to the ongoing mob storyline which features Lucas's former brother-in-law Sonny Corinthos (Maurice Benard) and his biological family the Jeromes. In the fall of 2013, Lucas agrees to a DNA test which proves he and Sam Morgan (Kelly Monaco) are paternal half-siblings. Later, an angry Sam accidentally mentions Lucas to Julian (William DeVry), prompting Julian to look into their connection.

Ron Carlivati said bringing back the character of Lucas became necessary when William deVry took over the role of Julian. They stuck with the original onscreen events, in which Julian never learns of Lucas's existence. Carlivati said Lucas is a very "central character" because he is related to majority of the canvas. In an interview with Michael Fairman of On-Air On-Soaps, Carnes said that Lucas feels a bit out of place and knowing Tony always accepted him, Lucas goes to the cemetery to "commune with his spirit." However, according to Carnes, finding Julian, his biological father, in the place where he visits the only father he's ever know, sets up an "instant conclift." So the confrontation is already happening occurring on "shaky ground." In an interview with Soap Opera Digest, Carnes said that Lucas is "quite comfortable with who he is and with his sexuality." However, discovering that Julian is alive is an "emotional upheaval," Carnes said. Telling Julian that he is gay is Lucas's way of testing Julian, "to see what he's made of." Despite Lucas being very sure of himself, Lucas views Julian's "lack of support," as "rejection." Lucas struggles with Julian's reaction and "spirals a bit," Carnes said. The actor looked forward to seeing how the "human situation" between Julian and Lucas would develop, it would help those who could identify with the situation.

=== Romances (2014–present) ===
According to Bobbie (Jacklyn Zeman), as of 2013, Lucas resides in Seattle, Washington and had still not found the right guy. The character's return sets up a romantic triangle between Lucas, Felix DuBois (Marc Anthony Samuel) and Brad Cooper (Parry Shen). In an interview with On-Air On-Soaps published on December 26, 2013, Carlivati confirmed that Lucas would definitely become a factor in the budding relationship between Brad and Felix. When it comes to Lucas and Brad, Carnes said, "how many times do we meet people who really and truly can understand our unique life experience, and get us on so many levels, and particularly, with these guys whose biological fathers are gangsters, and they're gay, they have to deal with acceptance and non-acceptance of their sexuality with their families." The "extremely unique" set of circumstances makes Lucas and Brad, "kindred spirits."

On January 28, 2014, ABC Daytime sent a press release which revealed that Lucas accepts Felix's invite to go out on Valentine's Day. Carnes remained tight lipped on how Lucas ends up going on a date with Felix, but maintained that Lucas and Brad have a real connection.

== Storylines ==
=== 1989–2001 ===
Upon his birth in 1989, Victor Jerome (Jack Axelrod) arranges for the baby to be sold on the black market, leading Cheryl (Jennifer Anglin) to believe her son died at birth. Bobbie buys the infant and names him Lucas after her brother, Luke (Anthony Geary). At the time, Lucas is believed to be Cheryl's son with Robert Scorpio (Tristan Rogers), who becomes Lucas's godfather when the boy is christened in 1989. Bobbie and Tony marry shortly after. Meanwhile, the Jerome family lawyer, Mark Broxton, hides Lucas's identity in a secret file called the "Billion Dollar Baby." Cheryl admits Julian is Lucas's father. Together, they start looking for him. To avoid jail time, Broxton attempts to use the information about Lucas in exchange for his freedom. Robert confronts Bobbie about her schemes, and Tony leaves her. Cheryl later leaves town with Lucas in tow. In late 1992, Cheryl is killed in a car accident. Lucas is taken in by his aunt Tiffany Hill (Sharon Wyatt) and her husband, Sean Donely (John Reilly). In her will, Cheryl leaves custody of Lucas to Bobbie and Tony. However, Tiffany decides to fight for custody. Bobbie wins custody. She and Tony officially adopt Lucas in March 1993. In 1994, Lucas's sister, B.J. dies and donates her heart to their cousin Maxie. In 1996, Tony and Bobbie divorce. Tony often harasses Bobbie about seeing Lucas. In 2001, Lucas is poisoned by Helena Cassadine and Tony is forced to work for her to obtain the cure. Luke is able to foil Helena's plans and obtain the cure for Lucas.

=== 2002–2006 ===
In 2002, Lucas admits to Maxie and Georgie he's having trouble in school. Georgie diagnoses him with dyslexia. She eventually develops a crush, but Lucas has a crush on Maxie. Maxie uses this to get close to Kyle Ratcliffe (Andrew St. John), but when she refuses to sleep with him, Kyle lies claiming they slept together. Lucas tricks Kyle into believing Maxie is pregnant to force him into telling the truth. Lucas is worried when Georgie falls for Dillon Quartermaine, thinking he will hurt her. Meanwhile, Lucas disapproves when Maxie forgives Kyle after he humiliates her even further. Georgie and Lucas plan to spend prom night together, but Maxie schemes to get Georgie to see them making out. Georgie is devastated and cuts both Lucas and Maxie out of her life. Lucas is later sent off to boarding.

Upon his return, Lucas begins dating Brook Lynn Ashton. Meanwhile, Georgie recruits Lucas to help teach Dillon about treating women as sexual objects. Lucas hits on Dillon, who is dressing in drag for an all-female band. However, Brook Lynn comes to Dillon's rescue. Lucas defends himself saying he'd do anything for Georgie. Georgie kisses Lucas to make Dillon jealous, destroying their relationships with both Dillon and Brook Lynn. However, Lucas and Brook Lynn rekindle their romance when they trapped at the Quartermaine mansion due to a serial killer going on the loose. Lucas helps Brook Lynn accept her new makeover for her singing career, He accompanies her to a school dance where they share their first kiss. Lucas and Brook Lynn eventually break up. In the fall of 2005, Lucas admits to his family and friends he is gay. Though Bobbie defends her son, she immediately wants to get him counseling. Lucas is shocked by how supportive Tony is about the news. Lucas is devastated when Tony dies in February 2006. Lucas also dates his high school friend, Guy Tucker (Nicholas DiNardo). Lucas later moves to Seattle, Washington.

=== 2014–present ===
Lucas returns to Port Charles when Bobbie informs him Carly is missing. Lucas sees Sam for the first time since the revelation about their connection, and is shocked to find Julian alive and well. Lucas rejects Julian and finds comfort in the arms of Brad Cooper. That relationship comes to a screeching halt, however, when Brad blurts out the truth that Britt's baby is actually Dante and Lulu's. After Julian's initial lack of support, he eventually accepts Lucas and tries to form a relationship. Julian invites Lucas, Sam, Silas, and Alexis to a dinner at the art gallery to announce his leaving the crime business. Lucas brings Felix along as a date. During the dinner a gunman hired by Julian's boss, the imposter Luke Spencer, is able to disguise himself as a waiter and shoots Lucas. His injuries are critical and he is rushed to the hospital for emergency surgery. After the surgery, the imposter Luke Spencer attempts to kill Lucas but Julian arrives in time to stop him. While in the hospital recovering, Felix and Brad fight over who will take care of him. Bobbie comes in and throws them both out. Lucas, while still recovering, consoles Felix who is distraught after the death of Sabrina Santiago and Patrick Drake's premature child. A jealous Brad sees this and overreacts, but Lucas tells him to back off.

In May 2015, Brad asks Lucas to marry him. In September 2015, it is revealed that Brad is married to Rosalie Martinez, the couple having been forced to marry each other so that neither would go to jail. In early 2016, Brad tells Lucas that he and Rosalie are divorced. On June 13, 2016, Lucas marries Brad at Julian and Alexis' House. Lucas cuts off Julian again after he nearly kills Alexis. In 2017–2018, Lucas and Brad set out to adopt a child. With the help of Alexis they are able to adopt a baby boy. Lucas asks Julian to stay away from the child due to his criminal past. After the child is born, Brad is given the news and is allowed to take the baby home. He is unable to reach Lucas and puts the child to sleep. Later, Brad checks on the baby and is shocked to see that he has died. Brad frantically takes the baby to the hospital but runs into his friend, Nelle Benson, on the side of the road. She is on the run from the police and has just given birth to her son, whose father is Lucas's nephew, Michael Corinthos. They agree to switch babies as Nelle convinces Brad that he and Lucas would be better parents than she would since she is likely to go to jail. Brad brings Nelle and Michael's baby home to take the place of the dead adopted baby and Lucas meets his son which they name Wiley Cooper-Jones. After a family gathering, Lucas and Brad find out that the birth mother wants to cancel the adoption. Brad tells Julian about the baby switch and that the adoption has to go through by any means. Julian agrees to help and convinces the birth mother to let the adoption stand. The mother agrees and the adoption is finalized.

== Reception ==
Following Hogestyn's sudden departure, many fans were left wondering what had happened to the character. Former GH writer Dave Goldschmid described the fan response to Lucas "coming out" as "heartwarmingly positive."

In April 2013,Soaps In Depth described Hogestyn's portrayal of Lucas as "sensitive," and suggested Hogestyn along with Zack Conroy, Van Hansis and Shawn Pyfrom would all be a good fit for the role of Lucas. In November 2010, Jamey Giddens also pushed for the character's return with Hansis in the role, thinking the soap could capitalize on the actor's huge fan base from As the World Turns.

Fan were thrilled by the announced of Carnes's return. Jillian Bowe said "Who Will Ryan Carnes Be Eating Out as General Hospital's Lucas?" referencing Carnes's role in the gay romantic comedy. Many expected the announcement due to heavy references of the character onscreen. With the announcement of Carnes's return, TheBacklot.com said the character's return couldn't come soon enough. Errol Lewis of Soap Opera Network commented the character's return would allow for the existing gay characters to step out of their supporting roles, and would also bring a lot of media attention to the series like the pairing of Will and Sonny did for NBC's Days of Our Lives. Instinct magazine said "Lucas's return to the hospital-based soap is just what the doctor ordered!" Greg Hernandez said Carnes's return was enough to make him watch General Hospital on the daily basis. Soaps In Depth pushed for Lucas to be paired with Felix in April 2013 and even gave the potential pairing the nickname "Lulix." In 2024, Soap Opera News named the casting of Hansis as Lucas as their third top recast of the year.
