= Freakshow (film) =

2007 American horror film directed by Drew Bell

- Original DVD cover
- Directed by: Drew Bell
- Written by: Keith Leopard
- Produced by: David Michael Latt; Sherri Strain
- Starring: Rebekah Kochan; Dane Rosselli; Diego Barquinero
- Cinematography: Mark Atkins
- Edited by: David Michael Latt; Kristen Quintrall
- Distributed by: The Asylum
- Release date: January 30, 2007
- Running time: 90 minutes
- Country: United States
- Language: English

Freakshow is a 2007 American horror film which was made by The Asylum and directed by Drew Bell. It is an unofficial remake of the Tod Browning film Freaks. it follows a gang of thieves works as security guards in a traveling carnival. Freakshow was released direct-to-video on January 30, 2007. According to the DVD cover art, Freakshow is banned in 43 countries, though no reports show this to be true. Critical reception for Freakshow has been mostly negative.

== Plot ==
A gang of thieves works as security guards in a traveling carnival. They plot to steal the rich owner's fortune. Lucy, one of the thieves, attempts to take the fortune by herself by seducing the Boss and marrying him. The youngest member of the Freakshow, Kimmie stumbles across a few of the gang members stealing food and she is murdered by the thieves. When the murder is discovered, the freaks plot revenge. In a variety of gruesome ways, the thieves are murdered by the freaks.

Lucy attempts to escape punishment by swearing her love for the carnival Boss. The freaks "spare" her by giving her a Freakshow "act" which will make her a full member of their troupe. They mutilate her, cut out her tongue, sew her mouth shut, strip her flesh, and cut off her limbs before finally displaying her in the Freakshow Gallery as the "Worm Girl".

== Cast ==
- Christopher Adamson as Lon, The Boss
- Rebekah Kochan as Lucy
- Dane Rosselli as Hank
- Mighty Mike Murga as Curtis The Dwarf
- Jeffrey Allen as Strongman
- Diego Barquinero as The Wolfman
- Jimmy Goldman as The Great Riwami
- Sharon Edrei as Sherri
- Amy Dunton as Bobby-Bobbie
- Amanda Ward as Cannibal Girl
- McKenna Geu as Kimmie "Little Kimmie"
- John Karyus as Elephant Man
- Stefanie Naifeh as Bearded Lady
- Evan Block as Human Shadow
- Bill Quinn as The Chef, Legless Man
- Etta Devine as Mongoloid
- Ken Gardner as Clown
- Wayne Baldwin as The Narrator

== Production and release ==
Freakshow was heavily inspired by Tod Browning's 1932 horror film Freaks. Many of Freakshow 's cast were actual circus performers and disabled actors which was also inspired by Browning's film. Freakshow was released on DVD January 30, 2007. It was later re-released on DVD by Echo Bridge Home Entertainment on May 18, 2010. According to the DVD cover art, Freakshow is banned in 43 countries, though no reports show this to be true.

== Reception ==
Critical reception for Freakshow has been mostly negative. On the review aggregator website Rotten Tomatoes, Freakshow has an approval rating of 15% by audiences. Horror News.net gave Freakshow a negative review stating, "Freakshow is not a movie I recommend, not because it is controversial, but because it is watered down and bland. That being said, I’m not against giving the writer and/or director another shot if I see their names on a different movie; we all make mistakes, and hopefully we learn from our biggest ones". Eat Horror panned it, calling Freakshow 's acting and script "awful", also criticizing its unsympathetic characters, and over the top gore.
