= George Stoll (artist) =

American artist (born 1954)

George Stoll (born 1954) is an American contemporary artist who makes sculptures and installations that replicate everyday, mass-produced household objects, elevating the domestic and mundane to the status of fine art. He lives in Los Angeles.

== Early life and education ==
George Stoll was born in Baltimore, Maryland, in 1954, and grew up in its suburbs with his sister, the actress Mink Stole. In the late 1970s, he moved to New York City to attend Parsons School of Design for fashion and the New School of Social Research for art history. He shared a studio loft with artist Donald Baechler. He worked in various jobs, including jewelry-making, set design for horror films, and working as an artist assistant. In the early 1990s, he relocated to Los Angeles, continuing to work as an art director and costume designer for theatre and film. He recalls being introduced to celebrities in the TV and film industry, who would completely forget meeting him. To address this imbalance, Stoll made a list, "Some people I've met who probably don't remember me." Stoll described the list as, "employing a device I like to use: chance groupings and random selection, I was able to cast them together because they had at least one thing in common, forgetting meeting me." (He later had the list woven into the cushion of a limited edition ottoman he produced.) Shortly afterwards, Stoll ended his pursuit of a career as a Hollywood art director and began an independent arts practice of replicating everyday objects that, similar to his status in Hollywood, were overlooked, imbuing them with unconventional materials and the skill of his hand, thereby making them memorable and unique, turning ordinary household items into something rare and noteworthy as artworks.

== Artistic practice ==
Untitled No. 2 (Tupperware) 1996, beeswax and paraffin with pigment. The collection of The Museum of Contemporary Art, Los Angeles.

Stoll's art practice centers on creating handmade representations of mass-produced items. Focused on everyday objects such as Tupperware tumblers, household sponges, and holiday remnants. Stoll is attracted to subjects seen but not usually noticed, which he meticulously copies verbatim. By removing these objects from their usual settings, they become more noticeable, allowing one to explore our shared domestic landscape by reconstructing it, piece by piece. From a distance, Stoll's creations appear functional, but upon closer inspection, they reveal their handcrafted, abstracted nature, fashioned with unconventional tools and materials.

Art critic and journalist Linda Yablonsky describes Stoll's artistic approach this way, "Having processed domestic culture through the art of Duchamp, Warhol, Tuttle, and Gober, Stoll makes art that is gay in every sense of the word — happy, fey, bright, carefree, exhilarating — wrestling the hidden from the visible, drawing a universe of meaning from personal experience, making life-size an idea bigger than all of us. In other words, it's sublime."

== Work ==
In 1994, Stoll started his art career by casting paraffin and beeswax mixed with pigment to form the uncanny, handmade duplicates of Tupperware. The colors sometimes perfectly match the Tupperware palette, while other times they appear like faded memories. The resulting sculptures have a soft, chalky quality that contrasts with the hard manufactured plastic of the originals.

Untitled (Two Toilet Paper Rolls, Peach and White) 1998, Pine, spackle, and alkyd on a painted wooden shelf.

Stoll has made Toilet Paper Rolls that are meticulously carved from pine wood, making every layer of tissue visible on their sides. Stoll adds spackle it to create its textured, fibrous surface that mimics the appearance of real toilet paper, turning the disposable consumer product into a durable, artisanal object. Others he's made include toilet paper dispensers that are installed in the wall. The toilet paper is replaced with a roll of delicate silk chiffon. Filmmaker and art collector John Waters has one installed in the wall of his Greenwich Village apartment, titled Untitled (wall inset toilet paper roll, hung backward, 1997). Waters has said that when he walks into the room, he feels compelled to unwind it, because "it's chiffon!".

Besides Stoll's sculptural works, he's also made wall-hanging works. In the Sponges, a series of carefully perforated blocks of balsa wood, the size of household sponges, are colored with alkyd paint. Skillfully executed to appear as a kitchen sponge and humorously presented as if they were minimalist paintings, juxtaposing the colors in sets of two or three and hanging them on the wall. Also, Stoll created Spirograph drawings that commented on Geometric and op art, inspired by his discovery of failed Spirographs at a children's movie promotional event, where one of the activities involved creating Spirographs that use gears within gears to produce geometric forms. Stoll discovered that when the gears didn't engage properly, the children's drawings were imperfect and abandoned. Stoll, drawn to the imperfections, would gather them up and painstakingly trace every detail of the failed Spirographs with colored pencils. Later, he would show them, elevating the children's failures as framed works of art on translucent paper.

Untitled (Valentine's Day, large bowl 1/2 full with 3 on side, on painted wooden shelf), 2008

Finding the most evocative aspect of every holiday celebration imaginable, Stoll assists the viewer in connecting with their personal memories in his Holidays series of sculptural works in a variety of media, including plaster, cheesecloth, silk organza, and paint, to create unique interpretations of porch flags, Easter eggs, Thanksgiving dinner platters, and Christmas lights. He distorts the vernacular vocabulary of this series with his bashed-in Halloween masks, or he takes a dadaist approach towards Valentine's Day, in works that explore how erotic love can manifest in a bowl full of breasts. A work inspired by the abundance of Ephesian Diana, a fertility goddess, whom he encountered in Roman artworks he saw during his residency at the American Academy of Rome. Stoll's Holidays series memorializes how Americans consume and celebrate their holidays by offering up the debris they leave behind through the thoughtful dedication and care he brings to his works.

In the Vanitas Vanitatum series (vanity of vanities), Stoll uses the artistic tradition of vanitas to critique the futility of materialism and its enabler, consumerism, by embroidering silk organza silhouetted cutouts of gold coins, golf courses, fleshy steaks, looted antiquities, crowns, jewels, etc., to provide a droll index of what we lust after in this life. He stages these dramas with a cast of skeletons and skulls in shadow boxes hung on the wall.

== Exhibitions ==
Stoll's work has been shown internationally since 1994, including one-person shows at Anthony Grant in New York City, Paule Anglim in San Francisco, Angles in Los Angeles, Windows in Brussels, Belgium, and Gallery Seomi in Seoul, Korea, among others. In 1996, the Contemporary Art Center in Cincinnati exhibited his work in a two-person show with Mark Bennett at the Mark Moore Gallery (Santa Monica, CA). In 2000, he showed with Clay Ketter at the Rose Museum at Brandeis University.

== Awards and collections ==
Stoll's work is in the collections of the Hammer Museum, UCLA, the Museum of Contemporary Art, Los Angeles, the Henry Art Gallery, University of Washington, and The Frances Young Tang Teaching Museum and Art Gallery at Skidmore College.

In 2005, Stoll became a Fellow of the American Academy in Rome.
