= Phillip J. Bartell =

American film editor

- Born: Phillip John Bartell; February 18, 1970 (age 56); Chicago, Illinois, U.S.
- Education: Columbia College Chicago
- Occupations: Editor, writer, producer, director
- Years active: 1993–present

Phillip John Bartell (born February 18, 1970) is an American film editor, screenwriter, producer and director.

== Early life ==
Bartell was born in Quincy, Illinois, and graduated from Columbia College Chicago in 1992.

== Career ==
Bartell has received critical praise for his work as editor of Dear White People (which Variety described as "precisely edited") as well as The Vanished Elephant and Miss You Already. Discussing The Vanished Elephant in Filmmaker Magazine, Jim Hemphill said, "That film, a Lynchian puzzle that leads the viewer through a complex labyrinth of disparate levels of reality, represented one kind of challenge for an editor, one that Bartell rose to and conquered with stunning proficiency." Hemphilll contrasted this with Bartell's work on Miss You Already, calling the latter "less flashy, but an even more impressive achievement in its own way, a subtle job of editing in which Bartell keeps every nuance and emotion in perfect balance."

Bartell also directed and co-wrote the 2006 Eating Out 2: Sloppy Seconds, which received mixed reviews. In the Chicago Reader, Andrea Gronvall found it "funnier, lighter, and faster paced" than the 2004 original (directed by Bartell's co-writer Q. Allan Brocka). However, in the Boston Globe, Wesley Morris found "no ostensible difference between them", saying, "This sequel, with the return of the first movie's insatiably slutty Los Angeles collegians, is as vulgar as its predecessor and just as almost-smart."

In 2019 Bartell directed the second season of SKAM Austin on Facebook Watch and produced by XIX Entertainment.

== Filmography ==
=== Editor ===
- Eating Out (2004)
- Boy Culture (2006)
- Ira & Abby (2006)
- Eating Out 2: Sloppy Seconds (2006)
- Save Me (2007)
- Noah's Arc: Jumping the Broom (2008)
- Eating Out 3: All You Can Eat (2009)
- Spork (2010)
- The Green (2011)
- Eating Out 4: Drama Camp (2011)
- Eating Out 5: The Open Weekend (2011)
- Eye of the Hurricane (2012)
- I Am Divine (2013)
- G.B.F. (2013)
- Chastity Bites (2013)
- Audrey (2014)
- Dear White People (2014)
- The Vanished Elephant (2014)
- Ana Maria in Novela Land (2015)
- Miss You Already (2015)
- Carrie Pilby (2016)
- Dear White People (2017)
- To All the Boys I've Loved Before (2018)
- Bad Hair (2020)
- Haunted Mansion (2023)
- Lilo & Stitch (2025)

=== Screenwriter ===
- Boys Life 4: Four Play (2003)
- Eating Out 2: Sloppy Seconds (2006)
- Eating Out 3: All You Can Eat (2009)
- Eating Out 4: Drama Camp (2011)
- Eating Out 5: The Open Weekend (2011)
- Eyewitness (2017)

=== Director ===
- Boys Life 4: Four Play (2003)
- Eating Out 2: Sloppy Seconds (2006)
- SKAM Austin (2019)
