= Unfallen =

- Directed by: Dante, Josh Hodgins
- Written by: James Nasimi
- Starring: James Nasimi; Michael Madsen; James Hong; Rebekah Kochan; Andre McCoy; Aida Rodriguez
- Cinematography: Chris Bond, Cliff Goldsmith
- Edited by: Devin Hamilton
- Music by: Mark Smythe
- Release date: June 30, 2017 (U.S.)
- Running time: 97 minutes
- Country: United States
- Languages: English; Tajik
- Budget: 200 000$

Unfallen is the first film by Tajik screenwriter Jaihun (James) Nasimi in Hollywood. The film premiered in Hollywood on June 30, 2017, and in Tajikistan on October 28, 2017.

== Cast ==
- James Nasimi
- Michael Madsen
- James Hong
- Rebekah Kochan
- Andre McCoy
- Aida Rodriguez

== Budget ==
The total budget of the film was approximately $200,000.00 (two hundred thousand dollars); assistance in raising funds was provided by Tajiks living in the United States and single biggest investor was Sirojiddin Murzaev and two Los Angeles film studios.”

== Reception ==
Michael Rechtshaffen of The New York Times called it, "A risible misfire of a contemporary war drama."
