= Skam Austin =

- Genre: Teen drama
- Based on: Skam by Julie Andem
- Written by: Julie Andem; Sarah Heyward; Karen DiConcetto; Jessie Kahnweiler; Marlana Hope
- Directed by: Julie Andem; Phillip J. Bartell
- Starring: Julie Rocha; Till Simon; Kennedy Hermansen; Austin Terry; Shelby Surdam; La'Keisha Slade; Valeria Vera; Aaliyah Muhammad; Pedro Castenada; Giovanni Niubo; Sophia Hopkins
- Theme music composer: Christian Wibe
- Composer: Sleep Good
- Country of origin: United States
- Original language: English
- No. of seasons: 2
- No. of episodes: 18

Production
- Executive producers: Julie Andem; Simon Fuller; Per Blankens; Sarah Heyward
- Producer: Hans Graffunder
- Production location: Austin, Texas
- Cinematography: Daniel McStay
- Editors: Christopher Roldan; Phillip J. Bartell; Tony Costello
- Camera setup: Single-camera
- Running time: 18–50 minutes
- Production companies: XIX Entertainment; Julie Andem Stories; Shiny Unicorn

Original release
- Network: Facebook Watch
- Release: April 27, 2018 – May 24, 2019

SKAM Austin is an American teen drama web series, based on the Norwegian television series Skam created by Julie Andem. It premiered with its first full episode on April 27, 2018 on Facebook Watch.

Employing the same distribution method and overall storylines as the original Norwegian production, SKAM Austin is shown in real-time through short clips on a daily basis on Facebook Watch, supplemented with screenshots of messages between the characters and compiled clips into full episodes on weekends. Real social media accounts created for the fictional characters allow viewers greater insight into the show beyond its clips. The first of these short clips was released on April 24, 2018.

On July 25, 2018, it was announced that Facebook had renewed the series for a second season. The second season premiered on March 15, 2019.

== Premise ==
SKAM Austin focuses on the lives of a group of students attending Bouldin High School in Austin, Texas. The first season focuses on Megan Flores, who is forced to deal with the consequences of her romantic relationship with Marlon, who used to be involved with her former best friend, Abby, the captain of Bouldin High's dance team, the Kittens. The second season focuses on Grace Olsen, one of Megan's best friends, who struggles with her feelings for Daniel Williamson, Bouldin High's captain of the football team. These feelings cause her to question her own beliefs as a feminist and put her friendships with Megan, Kelsey, Jo and Zoya in peril as a result.

== Cast and characters ==
| Actor | Character | Based on | | |
| Actor | Character | Based on | Season 1 | Season 2 |
|---|---|---|---|---|
Central characters
| Julie Rocha | Megan Flores | Eva Kviig Mohn | Central | Main |
| Kennedy Hermansen | Grace Olsen | Noora Amalie Sætre | Main | Central |
Main characters
| Till Simon | Marlon Frazier | Jonas Noah Vasquez | Main | Recurring |
| Austin Terry | Daniel Williamson | William Magnusson | Recurring | Main |
| Shelby Surdam | Kelsey Russell | Vilde Hellerud Lien | Main | Main |
| Valeria Vera | Josefina "Jo" Valencia | Christina "Chris" Berg | Main | Main |
| Aaliyah Muhammad | Zoya Ali | Sana Bakkoush | Main | Main |
| La'Keisha Slade | Shay Dixon | Isak Valtersen | Main | Recurring |
Recurring characters
| Pedro Castañeda | Jordan "Pen-Jo" Diaz | Christoffer "Penetrator-Chris" Schistad | Recurring | Recurring |
| Giovanni Niubo | Tyler Nunez | Isak Valtersen | | style="background: #FFE3E3; color:black; vertical-align: middle; text-align: center; " class="table-cast"| Recurring |
| Giovanni Niubo | Tyler Nunez | Mari Aspeflaten | | style="background: #FFE3E3; color:black; vertical-align: middle; text-align: center; " class="table-cast"| Recurring |
| Sophia Hopkins | Abby Heyward | Ingrid Theis Gaupseth | Recurring | Recurring |
| Praveena Javvadi | Poonam Para | Argentina | Recurring | Recurring |
| Sydney Chandler | Eve Olsen | Eskild Tryggvasson | | Recurring |
Guest characters
| Sydney Cope | Cleo | Iben Sandberg | Guest | |
| Julia Blackmon | Eliza W. | | Guest | |
| Sandra Avila | Megan's Mom | Mama Eva | Guest | |
| Ray Perez | Megan's Dad | | Guest | |
| William Magnuson | Hunter Tomlinson | | | Guest |
| Jacob Audrisch | Clay Williamson | Nikolai Magnusson | | Guest |
| Kenah Benefield | Nic Molinar | Sara Nørstelien | | Guest |
| Chawan Walch | Damian | Kasper | | Guest |

== Episodes ==
=== Series overview ===
| Season | Episodes | Originally released | | |
| Season | Episodes | First released | Last released | Network |
|---|---|---|---|---|
| 1 | 8 | April 27, 2018 | June 15, 2018 | Facebook Watch |
| 2 | 10 | March 22, 2019 | May 24, 2019 | Facebook Watch |

=== Season 1 (2018) ===
| No. overall | No. in season | Title | Directed by | Written by | Original release date |
|---|---|---|---|---|---|
| 1 | 1 | "Week 1 (Asking God to make you a loser)" | Julie Andem | Julie Andem & Sarah Heyward | April 27, 2018 |
| 2 | 2 | "Week 2 (Coolness is a private club)" | Julie Andem | Julie Andem & Sarah Heyward | May 4, 2018 |
| 3 | 3 | "Week 3 (They can smell fear)" | Julie Andem | Julie Andem & Sarah Heyward | May 11, 2018 |
| 4 | 4 | "Week 4 (Ready to lose your virginity?)" | Julie Andem | Julie Andem & Sarah Heyward | May 18, 2018 |
| 5 | 5 | "Week 5 (Where did all the tolerable people go)" | Julie Andem | Julie Andem & Sarah Heyward | May 25, 2018 |
| 6 | 6 | "Week 6 (They all need to hear this)" | Julie Andem | Julie Andem & Sarah Heyward | June 1, 2018 |
| 7 | 7 | "Week 7 (It was never going to be OK)" | Julie Andem | Julie Andem & Sarah Heyward | June 8, 2018 |
| 8 | 8 | "Week 8 (We will break free)" | Julie Andem | Julie Andem & Sarah Heyward | June 15, 2018 |

=== Season 2 (2019) ===
| No. overall | No. in season | Title | Directed by | Written by | Original release date |
|---|---|---|---|---|---|
| 9 | 1 | "Week 1 (Not my type)" | Phillip Bartell | Karen DiConcetto | March 22, 2019 |
| 10 | 2 | "Week 2 (Carbs are my boyfriend)" | Phillip Bartell | Karen DiConcetto & Jessie Kahnweiler | March 29, 2019 |
| 11 | 3 | "Week 3 (Stuck)" | Phillip Bartell | Marlana Hope | April 5, 2019 |
| 12 | 4 | "Week 4 (Here I am)" | Phillip Bartell | Jessie Kahnweiler | April 12, 2019 |
| 13 | 5 | "Week 5 (Great guy)" | Phillip Bartell | Karen DiConcetto | April 19, 2019 |
| 14 | 6 | "Week 6 (Doesn't want you)" | Phillip Bartell | Marlana Hope | April 26, 2019 |
| 15 | 7 | "Week 7 (Bad girl)" | Phillip Bartell | Jessie Kahnweiler | May 3, 2019 |
| 16 | 8 | "Week 8 (Not your fault)" | Phillip Bartell | Karen DiConcetto | May 10, 2019 |
| 17 | 9 | "Week 9 (Thought you were chill)" | Phillip Bartell | Jessie Kahnweiler | May 17, 2019 |
| 18 | 10 | "Week 10 (next phase)" | Phillip Bartell | Karen DiConcetto | May 24, 2019 |

== Production ==
=== Background ===
In the third quarter of 2016, the Norwegian teen drama series Skam gained significant momentum and an active fan base outside its Norwegian borders. The series became particularly notable for its unique distribution model of individual short clips uploaded daily to the broadcast network's website in real-time as events unfolded in the show's narrative, with the clips shown during a week combined into one episode. On the website, the clips were supplemented with screenshots of text messages between the characters, while real social media accounts were created for the fictional characters to interact with each other. Through its four-season, 43-episode run, Skam explored themes including loneliness, identity, eating disorders, sexual assault, homosexuality, mental health, religion and forbidden love.

=== Development ===
In December 2016, Simon Fuller's production company XIX Entertainment signed a deal with NRK, the Norwegian Broadcasting Corporation, to produce an English-speaking adaptation of the Norwegian series. Fuller told The Guardian that "Skam is an important show. [...] There is precious little content created primarily for a teen audience and Skam provides this with great honesty and integrity. The show packs a punch and is leading the way in exploring multiplatform storytelling." The New York Times wrote that the American version will introduce new characters and actors, but retain the original storytelling format, with consultation from NRK. Fuller told the Times that "We are exploring all content outlets. [...] Shame works across all platforms and that is what gives it a point of difference. We are looking to innovate and push the boundaries of how modern content is viewed and experienced". Swedish news publication Svenska Dagbladet reported that principal photography would take place between the third and fourth quarters of 2017, with location scouting in progress to find an American city "most American youths can relate to", and with an expected premiere in late 2018.

In October 2017, during the MIPCOM annual trade show, it was announced that Facebook had acquired the rights to air then-titled Shame on its "Facebook Watch" original video platform. Facebook's head of creative global strategy Ricky Van Veen said that "When I first heard about Skam, it felt like I was seeing the future of storytelling. We're incredibly enthusiastic about bringing it to global audiences on Facebook Watch". At the time of the MIPCOM announcement, it was incorrectly reported that Julie Andem, the creator, writer and director of the original Skam series, would also produce the U.S. version, a message later retracted in Norwegian media, with a clarification of a misunderstanding due to a "busy morning" and that such a job "has been and is a dialogue between Julie Andem, Facebook and XIX Entertainment". In November 2017, Andem announced on her Instagram account that she would take the part as showrunner and director of Shame, writing that she "didn't want to give it to somebody else" despite the obstacles of a foreign country with different cultures than the original series.

On July 25, 2018, it was announced during the annual Television Critics Association's summer press tour that Facebook had renewed the series for a second season.

=== Casting ===
In November 2017, Andem's Instagram featured a poster for a casting call for teenagers in Austin, Texas, with casting bureau Vicky Boone confirming to Norwegian media publication Aftenposten that filming of the series would take place in the city of Austin.

== Release ==
On April 19, 2018, the first short clips of the series were released, announcing April 24 as the official start of the series' daily releases. Social media accounts for some of the fictional characters had started posting content earlier, sometimes as far back as April 2017.

== Reception ==
In a positive review, Den of Geek's Kayti Burt gave the first episode a rating of 3.5 out of 5 and described the series as a "a little bit like SKAM (the Norwegian teen drama upon which it's based), a little bit like Friday Night Lights, and a little bit like its own, wonderful thing." In another favorable critique, Common Sense Media's Joyce Slaton gave the series a rating of four out of five stars and compared it positively against other teen dramas saying, "It moves a bit slowly, true. But so does real life -- and though SKAM Austin is no vérité documentary, it reads a lot more authentic than Riverdale or 13 Reasons Why."

Solfrid Skaret of Norwegian news publication TV 2 opined that SKAM Austin was a "flop". She cited viewership figures, showing an initial premiere-episode audience of 11.9 million viewers, with substantial drops in subsequent episodes, down to approximately 771.800 viewers for the fifth episode, although acknowledging an uptick in ratings for the sixth episode. Commenting on the developments, John Magnus Dahl, a Skam researcher at the University of Bergen, told TV 2 that it was an "incredibly sad development". He further stated that SKAM Austin is "a good series that has reached a lot of people, but the problem is that they haven't been able to keep people's attention", and reasoned that the lack of interest may be caused by the story. "That the story is identical to the Norwegian success is probably disappointing to some people. There are no surprise moments." Christopher Pahle of Norwegian press publication Dagbladet objected to Skaret's article and specifically its negative outlook of the show's performance. Pahle explained that, while the viewership numbers were objective and factual, SKAM Austin could not accurately be compared to the rest of the television industry due to its distribution on Facebook's new video platform, where Austin's audience numbers might be within expectations and the initial premiere rating could be heavily inflated due to a high volume of one-time viewers tempted to test the new service rather than dedicated viewers. The reporter also wrote that the original Norwegian production's success had also become its own worst enemy, elaborating that Skam itself did not have high ratings in its first season, was released stealthily to avoid older generations, and that the high expectations set forth by the Norwegian series' popularity meant news media might unfairly consider anything short of a total success a failure.

Slate's Inkoo Kang described the series' heavy use of Facebook services as a questionable action, dubbing the series "both innovative teen drama" and an "advertisement for Facebook". The report noted that while Skam also employed social media actively in its plot, Austin's characters have constant presence and common interactions through Facebook, Facebook Messenger, and Instagram, all owned by Facebook, while competing social networks Snapchat and YouTube are only mentioned, never shown. The article also noted that Snapchat, Facebook's "rival for the hearts and thumbs of America’s youth", was used as the platform of choice for a storyline involving the potential dissemination of a graphic image of blood on sheets, and that the distinctive sounds of instant messages through Facebook's Messenger service served as an "unofficial soundtrack". The article described the show's situation as "vaguely alarming", a "glamorization" of Facebook, as a contribution to the "normalization of the company’s grip on high-schoolers’ social lives", and that "content has seldom felt so indistinguishable from marketing".
