= Aida Rodriguez =

American comedian

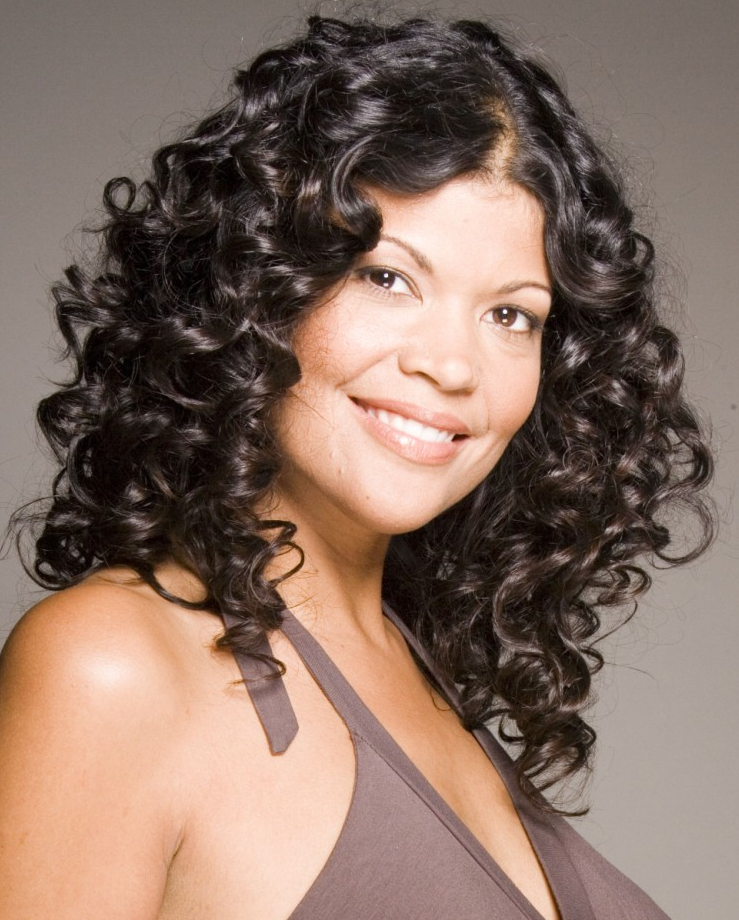
- Rodriguez in 2007
- Born: Aida Margarita Parada Rodriguez; August 29, 1977 (age 48); Boston, Massachusetts, U.S.
- Occupations: Comedian, actress
- Years active: 2007–present
- Spouse: 'Omar Ellison (divorced)
- Website: funnyaida.com

Aida Margarita Parada Rodriguez (born August 29, 1977) is an American comedian of Puerto Rican/Dominican descent who is best known for her appearance as a contestant on the eighth season of Last Comic Standing and as a commentator on The Young Turks. She is also an actress, producer, writer, and podcaster.

== Early life ==
Rodriguez was born in Boston, Massachusetts and taken to the Dominican Republic shortly afterward. As a child, her mother kidnapped her from her father in the Dominican Republic, and brought her to the U.S. Her grandmother and uncle would later abduct her from her mother's home in New York and bring her to Florida, in an attempt to protect her from her mother's boyfriend. Her uncle was later murdered in a hate crime. She attended Florida State University where she met her future husband 'Omar Ellison. She studied English and law, but left before graduating after she became pregnant. She was recruited by modeling agency IMG. She and Ellison later divorced.

Rodriguez moved to Los Angeles in the early 2000s with her two children after her divorce from Ellison. After a bout with anorexia and a divorce, she turned to comedy for healing. For a time, she and her children were homeless and lived out of a car.

== Career ==
Rodriguez attempts to transform painful episodes of her life into comedy material, while also addressing difficult issues such as misogyny and racism.

She was a top ten finalist in the eighth season of NBC's Last Comic Standing (2014), but was eliminated in the seventh episode of the season after losing a head-to-head showdown against Rod Man (who ultimately won the LCS title). She finished in a tie for ninth place.

Rodriguez is a five-time host of the Imagen Awards, which recognizes "the positive portrayal and creative excellence of Latinos and Latino cultures on screen".

Through the stand-up comedy circuit, Rodriguez met Tiffany Haddish, who has proven a long-time friend and a strong advocate for women of color comics. In August 2019, Rodriguez was featured in the comedy anthology series Tiffany Haddish Presents: They Ready on Netflix. She was one of six featured comedians, each given a half-hour comedy special.

Currently, Rodriguez appears as a co-host of The Young Turks online platform.

In collaboration with HBO Max, Rodriguez released her debut hour-long comedy special on November 4, 2021. Throughout the special, she speaks on issues in today's world and relates them to her personal life.

== Personal life ==
In October 2023, Rodriguez signed the Artists4Ceasefire open letter to president Joe Biden, calling for a ceasefire of the Israeli bombardment of Gaza.

== Filmography ==
=== Film ===
Year	Title	Role	Notes
2007	Black Woman's Guide to Finding a Good Man		Video
2008	Fotonovela	Ida	Video
2009	The Rub	Marilyn	
2009	The Greatest Song	Salma Munoz	
2009	Just Wrong	Paz	Short
2009	The Adventures of Umbweki	Shelia	
2009	Caught in the Game	Comedian	
2010	Brainiacs in La La Land	Liz	
2012	Got Rights?	Cuban Girl	Short
2013	A Heart's Journey	Isabel Morales	Short
2014	Wishes	Mo The Genie	
2015	The C & Borracho Show	Cassandra Fernandez (voice)	Video short
2016	Ladies Book Club	Lavanya	TV movie
2016	The Comedian	Herself	
2016	Celebrity Sports Roast & Toast	Herself	TV movie
2016	All Def Digital's Roast of America	Herself	TV movie
2017	Unfallen	Secretary Teresa Peters	
2018	Shaquille O'Neal Presents: All Star Comedy Jam - I'm Still Laughing	Herself	Video
2020	Break In	Jimmy's Mom	Short
2021	Who Gets to Sleep with Me Tonight	The Cat	Short

=== Television ===
Year	Title	Role	Notes
2010-11	Latino 101	Herself	Main cast: Season 2
2011-12	Illegal	Beatriz Rodriguez	Main cast
2012	The Wedding Zinger	Herself/host	TV special
2012	Trend This!	Herself	Episode: "The Makeover"
2012	Parental Discretion with Stefanie Wilder-Taylor	Herself	Episode: "The Business of Babies"
2013	NickMom Night Out	Herself	Episode: "Los Angeles Episode 2"
2013	Stand Up and Deliver	Herself	2 episodes
2014	Last Comic Standing	Herself/contestant	Main cast: Season 8
2014-16	Imagen Awards	Herself/host	TV special
2015	Gotham Comedy Live	Herself/contestant	Episode: "Chris Kattan"
2015-16	The Nightly Show with Larry Wilmore	Herself/panelist	2 episodes
2017	Comedy Knockout	Herself	Episode: "Just Suck It"
2017	The Church of What's Happening Now	Herself	Episode: "Aida Rodriguez"
2017	Kiki Mobile	Herself	Episode: "On Top of the World"
2018	Laff Mobb's Laff Tracks	Herself	Episode: "Strong Women"
2018	Sh#t I Love with Jason Stuart	Herself	Episode: "Aida Rodriguez"
2018	Entre Nos Part 1	Herself	Episode: "Entre Nos Part 3"
2018	Happy Half Hour	Herself	Episode: "Aida Rodriguez - Carmenere"
2018	This Week at the Comedy Cellar	Herself	Episode: "November 11–16, 2018"
2018	Comedians and Cocktails	Herself	Episode: "Grown People Talk"
2019	Mom Coms	Comedian	Episode: "Child Birth is a Horror Movie"
2021	Pause with Sam Jay	Party Guest	Episode: "Pregnant Studs"

=== Comedy releases ===
Year	Title	Notes
2021	Aida Rodriguez: Fighting Words	TV special
