= Rebekah Kochan =

American actress

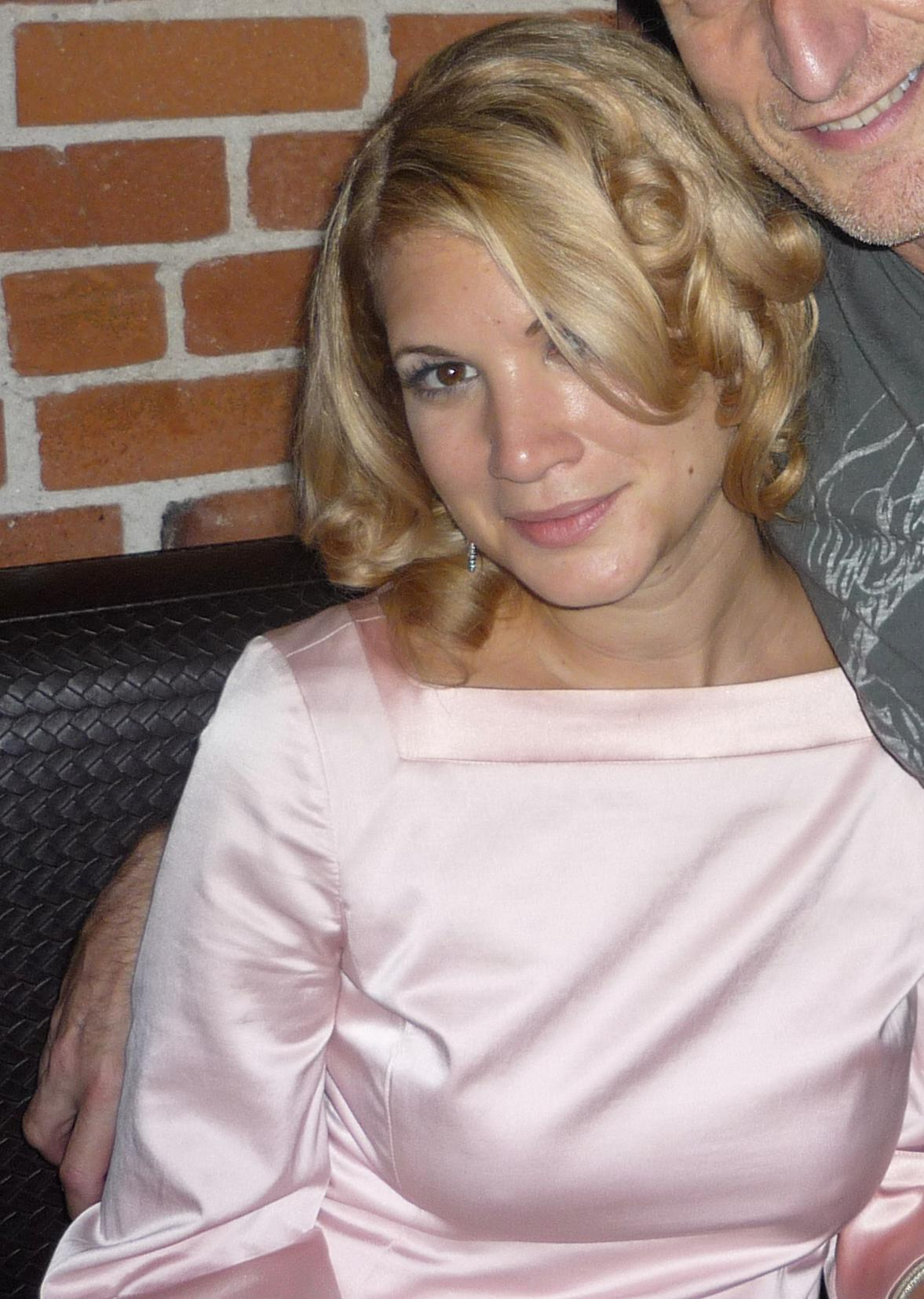
- Born: April 28, 1984; Las Vegas, Nevada, U.S.
- Occupation: Actress
- Years active: 2004–present

Rebekah Kochan (born April 28, 1984) is an American actress. She is best known for her role as Tiffani von der Sloot in the Eating Out franchise.

== Biography ==
Kochan has been acting since she was nine years old. Her first role was in a Las Vegas production of Annie, where she played the lead.

== Filmography ==
Year	Title	Role	Notes
2004	Eating Out	Tiffani von der Sloot	
2005	Artistic License	Start Here Girl	
2006	Exorcism: The Possession of Gail Bowers	Francie	
2006	When a Killer Calls	Trisha	
2006	Bram Stoker's Dracula's Curse	Trixie McFly	
2006	Eating Out 2: Sloppy Seconds	Tiffani von der Sloot	
2006	Pirates of Treasure Island	Anne Bonney	
2006	Halloween Night	Shannon	
2007	Freakshow	Lucy	
2007	Lez Be Friends	Constance	
2008	Flu Bird Horror	Lola	TV series
2009	Eating Out 3: All You Can Eat	Tiffani von der Sloot	
2009	Homewrecker	Sheila	
2009	The Telling	Lily	
2010	Fishnet	Trixie	
2011	Finding Mr. Wright	Eddy Malone	
2011	Eating Out 4: Drama Camp	Tiffani von der Sloot	
2011	Yorktown	Heather	
2012	Conversations with Future Stars	Make-up Artist	Episode: "Real Faces"
2012	Eating Out 5: The Open Weekend	Tiffani von der Sloot	
2013	InAPPropriate Comedy	Passerby	
2013	First Period	Jenny	
2014	Waiting in the Wings: The Musical	Gina	
2014	If We Took a Holiday	Receptionist	Short film
2014	Bro, What Happened?	Cherry	
2015	Shady Bunch	Sabrina Rivers Robertson (2015)	TV series
2015	Deadly Sanctuary	Kendall O'Dell	
2016	Girlfriends of Christmas Past	Biker Mom	TV film
2017	Open	Gabby	
2017	Unfallen	Newscaster	
2018	Waiting in the Wings: Still Waiting	Gina	
