= Chris Salvatore =

American actor, singer-songwriter, and model (born 1985)

- Born: Christopher Louis Salvatore; May 22, 1985 (age 41); Richboro, Pennsylvania, U.S.
- Genres: Pop, pop rock, dance
- Occupations: Actor, singer, songwriter, model, gay rights activist
- Instruments: Vocals, piano, keytar
- Years active: 2007–present
- Website: www.chrissalvatore.com

Christopher Louis Salvatore (born May 22, 1985) is an American actor, singer-songwriter, model, and gay rights activist, known for his performances as Zack in the Eating Out gay film series. In 2011, he was ranked at No. 41 on AfterElton's annual list of the top 50 gay and bisexual male celebrities.

== Early life ==
Growing up in the small town of Richboro, Pennsylvania, Salvatore spent his days singing, acting, and performing for his family. By the time he was 15, he had already written his first song.

== Career ==
Salvatore attended the New York Conservatory for Dramatic Arts. He was later cast as Zack in Eating Out 3: All You Can Eat (2009), within a week of moving to Los Angeles. He continued the role in two additional films in the series, Eating Out 4: Drama Camp (2011), and Eating Out 5: The Open Weekend (2012).

Salvatore released a single, "Dirty Love", in 2010. His later efforts include the singles "What You Do To Me" (2012) and the ballad "Hurricane" (2012). Salvatore's songs have been featured on MTV's Paris Hilton's My New BFF and in the movie credits of Eating Out 3. He has also uploaded short musical covers of songs he and his fans like to his YouTube channel, which in August 2017 had over 36.5K subscribers.

In 2011, Salvatore was ranked at No. 41 on AfterElton's annual list of the top 50 gay and bisexual male celebrities.

Salvatore appeared as himself in the 2017 Logo TV reality series Fire Island.

Salvatore also promotes equality in the LGBT community, and supports the Gay American Heroes foundation, an anti-bullying charity. Some of his videos include messages for the It Gets Better Project.

In 2017, he raised more than $50,000 to help pay for home care for Norma Cook, whom he first met when he moved into an apartment across the hall from her in L.A. He used GoFundMe to help pay for her, as they became friends and she told him she was diagnosed with leukemia. She later died due to complications from her illness.

During the 2020 COVID-19 pandemic, Salvatore started an OnlyFans account. Due to his OnlyFans work, he was released by the production of The Real Friends of WeHo after a week of filming.

== Filmography ==
Year	Title	Role	Notes
2007	Misplaced	Jonathon	Video short, 20 minutes
2009	Eating Out 3: All You Can Eat	Zack	
2010	FIT		
2011	Eating Out 4: Drama Camp	Zack	
2012	Eating Out 5: The Open Weekend	Zack	
2012	By the Way		Short film
2014	Bro, What Happened?	Zack	
2015	Paternity Leave	Thomas	
2015	Coffee House Chronicles: The Movie	Mitch	Based on the web series
2016	BearCity 3	Sebastian	
2017	The Deaf vs The Dead	Dustin	Short film
2018	The Quiet Room	Joe	Short horror film
2018	Underworld Minus Love	Band Performer	
2019	The Office Is Mine	Tristan	Short horror film
2020	Catfish Killer	Ben	Short horror film
2020	Anastasia and Her Five Husbands	Tyler	Short film
TBA	Scorch Marks	Joel	Post-production

=== Television ===
Year	Title	Role	Notes
2014	Just Us Guys	Himself	
2015	Paradise Pictures	Ronald	(TV Movie)
2015	Coffee House Chronicles	Mitch	Web series
2016	Girlfriends of Christmas Past	Tyler	(TV Movie)
2017	Fire Island	Himself	Episode: "Mercury is in Retrograde"
2019	EastSiders	Chandler	4 episodes

== Discography ==
=== Studio albums ===
List of studio albums, with selected chart positions and album details
Title	Details
After All Is Said and Done	Released: 2008; Label: Self-released; Formats: Streaming
The Sound of This Beat	Released: November 8, 2011; Label: Self-released; Formats: CD, streaming

=== Soundtrack albums ===
Title	Details
Eating Out: Drama Camp (Original Motion Picture Soundtrack)	Released: September 23, 2011; Label: GeoHarmonic; Formats: CD, streaming

=== Extended plays ===
List of extended plays, with selected details, chart positions, and sales
Title	Details
Dirty Love	Released: April 27, 2010; Label: Self-released; Format: CD, streaming
Dirty Love – The Remixes	Released: January 30, 2011; Label: Self-released; Format: CD, streaming

=== As lead artist ===
List of singles as lead artist, showing year released and album name
Title	Year	Album
"After All Is Said and Done"	2006	After All Is Said and Done
It Gets Better	2010	The Sound of This Beat
Drama Queen	2011	Eating Out: Drama Camp (Original Motion Picture Soundtrack)
What You Do To Me	2012	Non-album single
Hurricane	2012	Non-album single
I Want Your Sex	2013	The Sound of This Beat
Wrecking Ball	2013	Non-album single
All I Want For Christmas	2013	Non-album single
Summer	2014	Non-album single
Demons	2014	Non-album single
Breathe Me (featuring Alius)	2015	Non-album single

== Bibliography ==
Children’s books

- Salvatore, Chris; Steffes, Nicole (Illustrator); My Neighbor Norma. (2025).

Coffee table books

- Salvatore, Chris; Villarama, Lester (Photography); The Cabin. (2024).
- Villarama, Lester (Photography); Salvatore Chris (Featuring); Apartment Series Volume I: Chris Salvatore. (2025).
- Salvatore, Chris; Villarama, Lester (Photography); Desert Dreams. (2025).
- Salvatore, Chris; Villarama, Lester (Photography); Island Boy. (2026).
