= Harmony Santana =

American film actress

- Occupation: Film actress
- Known for: Gun Hill Road

Harmony Santana is an American film actress. She is most noted for her appearance in the 2011 film Gun Hill Road, for which she garnered an Independent Spirit Award nomination for Best Supporting Actress, and became the first openly transgender actress to be nominated for a major acting award in the United States. Santana has also had supporting roles in Eating Out 4: Drama Camp, Eating Out 5: The Open Weekend, and the Susie Singer Carter-directed short film "My Mom and the Girl."

At the time of her performance in Gun Hill Road, Santana lived at Green Chimneys, a group home for LGBT youth in Manhattan. She was discovered by director Rashaad Ernesto Green at the Queens Pride parade after he had difficulty finding the right performer for the role.

She is of mixed Puerto Rican and Dominican heritage.

== See also ==
- LGBT culture in New York City
- List of LGBT people from New York City
- NYC Pride March
