= Eating Out =

2004 film by Q. Allan Brocka

- Theatrical release poster
- Directed by: Q. Allan Brocka
- Written by: Q. Allan Brocka
- Produced by: Danielle Probst
- Starring: Rebekah Kochan; Ryan Carnes; Jim Verraros; Scott Lunsford; Emily Stiles
- Cinematography: Keith J. Duggan
- Edited by: Phillip J. Bartell
- Music by: Dominik Hauser
- Production company: Ariztical Entertainment
- Distributed by: Ariztical Entertainment
- Release dates: February 14, 2004 (Phoenix International Lesbian and Gay Film Festival); March 18, 2005 (United States; limited)
- Running time: 84 minutes
- Country: United States
- Language: English
- Budget: $50,000
- Box office: $155,212

Eating Out is a 2004 American sex comedy film written and directed by Q. Allan Brocka and starring Rebekah Kochan, Ryan Carnes, Jim Verraros, Scott Lunsford, and Emily Stiles.

== Plot ==
After getting dumped by his girlfriend Tiffani von der Sloot (Rebekah Kochan), University of Arizona student Caleb Peterson (Scott Lunsford) commiserates with his roommate Kyle (Jim Verraros), who notes that while he has trouble getting the men he wants, he could get any woman because he is gay. Later at a party, Gwen Anderson (Emily Stiles) dumps her boyfriend after he comes out to her. Caleb sees her and becomes infatuated and meets Marc Everhard (Ryan Carnes), with whom Kyle is infatuated. Marc, meanwhile, sees Caleb and is instantly attracted. Kyle comes up with a crazy scheme. He tells Gwen that Caleb is gay so she'll set him up with Marc. Kyle figures that Caleb can use Marc to get to Gwen, while Kyle uses Caleb to get to Marc. Also, Tiffani lives next door to Gwen and Marc so seeing Caleb date Marc would make her crazy.

Caleb and Marc go out on a date then go back to Marc's place to watch a movie. Marc tries to put the moves on Caleb, who is unresponsive. Suddenly Gwen, who is stuck at a friend's house and bored, calls. She talks to Caleb, relaxing and seducing him verbally while Marc takes advantage by performing oral sex on him. Gwen hangs up to come home and Marc masturbates next to Caleb. Caleb, feeling confused and insecure, leaves. He passes Gwen on her way home and she seduces him again, this time physically. They have sex in his convertible. Caleb goes home and goes to bed.

The next morning, Marc calls Caleb and leaves a message. Kyle overhears it and realizes that Marc and Caleb had sex. As Kyle storms into his room, Marc calls back. After the call Caleb goes to Kyle and tells him he has invited Gwen and Marc to dinner to clear everything up. He also says that he knows Kyle has feelings for him and that if he were gay he would love him back, and the two share a small kiss. Gwen and Marc come over for dinner and Caleb is chagrined to see that Kyle has invited Caleb's family as well. Kyle convinces Gwen to "pretend" to be Caleb's date and Marc to "pretend" to be his. Dinner is going well, if a little awkwardly, until Tiffani inexplicably crashes the party. Gwen takes it upon herself to out Caleb to his parents (Murph Michaels and Mattie van der Voort). His parents take it quite well and everyone ends up in a bizarre group hug.

After Caleb's family and Tiffani leave, Gwen verbally attacks Kyle, thinking he is trying to steal Marc from Caleb. She makes it clear that "someone like Marc" would never go out with "someone like him." Caleb convinces Marc to talk to Kyle and Gwen figures out the entire scheme, which she thinks is the sweetest thing anyone has ever done for her in light of the lengths to which Caleb went to sleep with her. Marc goes to talk to Kyle and tells Kyle that he was into him all along, having feigned disinterest this whole time. They finally kiss.

In a post-credits scene, Marc and Kyle are shown shirtless, making out in his bed; it is implied they are about to have sex.

== Cast ==
- Rebekah Kochan as Tiffani von der Sloot
- Ryan Carnes as Marc Everhard
- Jim Verraros as Kyle
- Scott Lunsford as Caleb Peterson
- Emily Stiles as Gwen Anderson
- Natalie Burge as Milkshake Marcy
- Billy Shepard as Joey
- John Janezic as Richard
- Stafford "Doc" Williamson as Professor Winston James
- Jillian Nusbaum as Jamie Peterson
- Murph Michaels as Frank Peterson
- Martie van der Voort as Susan Peterson

== Critical reception ==
Based on 26 reviews, the film has a 19% on Rotten Tomatoes with an average rating of 4.3 out of 10. The site's critics consensus states, "The cast recites lines of forced wit that aren't funny, and the clunky plot has too many contrivances."

== Awards ==
- Breckenridge Festival of Film 2004 Best of the Best LGBT Film
- Dallas OUT TAKES 2004 Audience Award
- Phoenix Out Far! Lesbian and Gay Film Festival 2004 Audience Award Best Feature Film
- Rhode Island International Film Festival 2004 Best Feature
- San Diego Film Festival 2004 Audience Award Best Feature
- San Francisco International Lesbian & Gay Film Festival 2004 Best First Feature

== Sequels ==
Eating Out has spawned four sequels to date. Sloppy Seconds was released in 2006 with Brett Chukerman replacing Ryan Carnes as Marc. All You Can Eat was released in 2009. Drama Camp and The Open Weekend were released in 2011.
