= Rick & Steve: The Happiest Gay Couple in All the World =

2007–2009 American TV series

- From left to right: Evan, Chuck, Dana, Kirsten, Rick, Steve
- Genre: Adult animation Black comedy
- Created by: Q. Allan Brocka
- Starring: Alan Cumming; Billy West; Lori Alan; Peter Paige; Mitch Morris; Wilson Cruz; Laraine Newman; Emily Brooke Hands; Jessica-Snow Wilson; Liza Del Mundo; Q. Allan Brocka; Will Matthews; Taylor Dooley
- Ending theme: "Rick and Steve: The Happiest Gay Couple in All the World theme" (instrumental) "It's Raining Pussycats" (episode 4)
- Countries of origin: United States; Canada
- Original language: English
- No. of seasons: 2
- No. of episodes: 14

Production
- Executive producers: Q. Allan Brocka; Dave Mace; Eileen Opatut; Lance W. Reynolds
- Running time: 22 minutes
- Production company: Cuppa Coffee Studios

Original release
- Network: Channel 4 Logo TV; Teletoon at Night; A Vancouver Island
- Release: July 10, 2007 – January 27, 2009

Rick & Steve: The Happiest Gay Couple in All the World (also known as Rick & Steve) is a stop motion adult animated sitcom created by Q. Allan Brocka, who also acts as director. It is a spin-off from Brocka's 1999 short film of the same name, and debuted on the LGBT-focused Logo network in July 2007 and on the Canadian Teletoon's late-night programming block "The Detour" that October.

The second season debuted on November 11, 2008. As of May 2024, there are no plans for a third season.

== Overview ==
The show follows the lives of three gay couples—the titular Rick and Steve, Chuck and Evan, and Dana and Kirsten—as they live in the fictional gay ghetto of West Lahunga Beach and interact with their friends and family. The title is ironic, as all three of the main couples have typical "couple issues"—including Steve actively seeking a three-way with Rick and another man, Kirsten and Dana deciding to have a baby with Rick's sperm, and Chuck and Evan simply trying to be together despite a 31-year age difference between them.

== Characters ==
=== Main ===
- Rick Brocka Jr. (voiced by Will Matthews): Steve's 30-year-old Filipino American genius husband. He's a homemaker/computer programmer who's "obsessed with cleanliness and science fiction" and a member of the West Lahunga Beach chapter of Gay Men-zuh. He is insecure about his relationship with Steve and prone to overanalyzing minor slights, but very kind and loving. He generally holds the role of the show's everyman figure. Steve's pet name for Rick is Piggy.
- Steve Ball (voiced by Peter Paige): Rick's 33-year-old husband. Steve is a well-off real estate broker, despite not being very bright. He's more than a little fixated on his appearance, spending hours in the gym at a time, but personally sees no problem with that. Despite his love for only Rick, he seeks a more exciting sex life. Rick's pet name for Steve is Daddy.
- Kirsten Kellogg (voiced by Emily Brooke Hands in Season 1, Jessica-Snow Wilson in Season 2): Kirsten is 28, Rick's best friend from college and Dana's wife. She's considered a lipstick lesbian, though she has been confused for a boy often in her life. She is an artist and also manages Chick Sticks, a sex toy store.
- Dana Bernstein (voiced by Taylor M. Dooley): Kirsten's angry 32-year-old bulldyke wife. A project manager with Habitat for Humanity, Dana is misanthropic, misandric and quick to hurl insults, particularly at Steve, but is willing to help Rick and Steve with household repairs when the need arises. She's also in touch with her Jewish heritage, but only in a political sense. She has a strained relationship with her divorced parents, Saul and Marlene, and had a brother, Dick (the only male she genuinely liked), who was killed when he won the gold medal in gymnastics at the Olympics and a stray javelin struck him while he was on the medal podium.
- Chuck Masters (voiced by Alan Cumming): Chuck is 50 years old and Steve's best friend and Evan's boyfriend. He is both HIV-positive and paralyzed from the left testicle down—putting him in a wheelchair. The two are only tangentially connected; he was hit by a car while leaving the clinic after receiving his positive test result. Chuck is an angry, yet truthful, individual. In "Mom Fight", it is revealed that he is a gold star gay (a gay man who was never with a woman). He had sex with a woman in the same episode, and discovered he may be bisexual.
- Evan Martinez (voiced by Wilson Cruz): Evan is Chuck's 19-year-old vacuous kept boyfriend. He's addicted to a multitude of drugs, to the point that forgetting to take them for a day completely messes up his system. He's also the most superficial and trendy of all characters and loves to spend time in clubs.
- Condoleezza "Condi" Ling (voiced by Margaret Cho): West Lahunga Beach's resident fag hag, or "alternative lifestyle companion" as she prefers to be called. She has been a beard to 17 gay men (the first being Rick) and becomes suicidal whenever they come out of the closet. Because of this, she is on numerous anti-depressants as well as anti-psychotics. However, she still puts on a cheery exterior when she parties every night with Evan, whom she has tried to steal from Chuck. It has also been shown that she takes great pride in being the only straight person in West Lahunga Beach.
- Dixie Bernstein-Brocka-Kellogg (voiced by Lori Alan): Kirsten and Dana's baby. The original plan was for Kirsten to bear the child after being artificially inseminated with Rick's sperm — but after Steve was offended that his sperm was apparently not good enough, straining his relationship with Rick, the two secretly decided to both provide sperm for the sample, and then in the process of bringing the sperm home to impregnate Kirsten, Dana accidentally got pregnant when she spilled it on herself. Dana spends almost three weeks in labour before Dixie is finally born, and names her daughter in memory of her deceased brother Dick (who would go by the name Dixie when in drag). Dixie appears to have paranormal powers, possessing the ability to telekinetically attract objects that are out of her physical reach.
- Pussy (voiced by Liza del Mundo): Rick and Steve's cat, Pussy is so smart that she sometimes talks to people. She's jealous of Dixie getting all the attention that used to be lavished on her, and frequently plots to get rid of the baby so she can reclaim her rightful place in the pecking order. However, at other times she is shown to be helpful and generous, often suggesting the perfect solution to a seemingly intractable problem or leading the humans to important information that's been hidden from them. Like Dixie, she also appears to have paranormal powers, possessing the ability to conjure a snowstorm — in Southern California — after overhearing another character's wish for a white Christmas.

=== Family ===
- Joanna (voiced by Lorna Luft): Steve's mother, she is a former Southern belle who is newly divorced from a different former husband each time she appears. Almost all of her former husbands have been named Carlton. She is outrageously racist and homophobic — in her first appearance she is persistently oblivious to the fact that Steve is gay, even going so far as to convince herself that Rick is a woman, and in her second, she is determined to break Rick and Steve up.
- Minda (voiced by Liza del Mundo): Rick's mother. Doting, gay-friendly and seemingly psychic, she can tell that Joanna put dog excrement in her adobo just by smelling it through the phone, and frequently calls with the answers to questions she hasn't been asked yet. She is happily married to Rick's father, although he has never been seen saying anything but "Huh?"
- Uncle Bakla (voiced by Alec Mapa): Rick's uncle and Minda's brother. Flamboyantly and effeminately gay, he is only too happy to hook up with Rick's rice queen ex-boyfriend Hunter. Minda wishes Rick were more flamboyant like her brother.
- Charo Martinez (voiced by Wilson Cruz in Season 1): Evan's mother. Despite being born and raised in California, she speaks with a strong Mexican accent because she learned English from her immigrant nanny rather than her wealthy Hispanic American parents. She gave birth to Evan as a teenager, so she's still only in her early 30s despite having a 19-year-old son. In the Season 2 finale, when a Homeland Security agent is in town to deport people who look like illegal immigrants whether they are or not, Chuck undertakes a My Fair Lady-style project to protect her by transforming her into Hillary Clinton.

=== Friends ===
- Ebony and Ivory (voiced by Liza del Mundo and Lori Alan): An interracial lesbian couple, even more hyper-PC than Kirsten and Dana. They named their baby Echinacea (spelled as Echanasia in close captioning), and refuse to learn what gender she/he is so that she/he can discover that for her/himself.
- Michaela (voiced by Q. Allan Brocka): Dana's ex. Even butcher than Dana, she is twice the height and width of any other character on the show, and is constantly plotting to break Kirsten and Dana up so that she can get back together with Dana. In the episode "It's Raining Pussy" she mistook a stun gun for a sexual toy; however, she ended up enjoying it and considered it to be "The greatest bang I ever had!"
- Tyler (voiced by RuPaul): An African-American friend of Steve's from the gym, he is exasperated by Steve's latent racism ("You're totally racist. I mean, I'm one of your best friends, and how many episodes have I even been in?") and the unconscious homophobia of their straight gym partner J.P. (voiced by Darryl Stephens).
- Bodiless Mute Blind Latina Lesbian in a Wheelchair is a disembodied head whose inarticulate mumbles are translated by her live-in nurse Jessica (voiced by Margaret Cho).

=== Other minor characters ===
- Felatia (voiced by Q. Allan Brocka): An African-American drag queen who tends bar at Antoine's Fissure. She also appears as an usher at Steve and Dana's fake wedding, and as the Wicked Witch in a Wizard of Oz parody.
- Dylan Ram-Brick (voiced by Billy West): A leatherstud porn star. Rick and Steve once brought him home for a three-way, and discovered that he's actually a transgender man. He's also Felatia's former roommate.
- Franz Nerdlinger (voiced by Billy West in Season 1, Q. Allan Brocka in Season 2): The head of Gay Menzuh, he's a nerdy scientist obsessed with comics.
- Anderson Pooper (voiced by Billy West): An outrageously sensationalist anchor on the local news channel. He usually serves in brief standalone gags seen when one of the characters is watching television, although in one episode his exposé on lesbian gang violence is central to the storyline.
- Hunter (voiced by Billy West): Rick's ex-boyfriend. He is exclusively attracted to Asian guys, to the point that he's physically incapable of even seeing a non-Asian person if there is an Asian around. Ironically, he seems unable to tell the difference between an Asian and a Latino. He owns virtually all of West Lahunga Beach's Chinatown.
- Dr. Hunk (voiced by Billy West): A handsome doctor at Ursula Rodriguez Memorial Hospital who makes all the boys swoon.

Guest voices have included Mitch Morris, Mark Hamill, Jim J. Bullock, Jill Bennett, Lance Bass, Andy Dick, Jai Rodriguez, George Takei, Laraine Newman, Bruce Vilanch and Robert Gant. Margaret Cho, Liza Del Mundo and Billy West voice minor characters in addition to their primary roles, and series creator Q. Allan Brocka also contributes minor character voices.

== Episodes ==
=== Series overview ===
Season	Episodes	Originally released	
Season	Episodes	First released	Last released
1	6	July 10, 2007	August 14, 2007
2	8	November 11, 2008	January 27, 2009

=== Season 1 (2007) ===
No.	Title	Original release date
1	"Guess Who's Coming for Quiche?"	July 10, 2007
Dana and Kirsten ask Rick to donate sperm to inseminate Kirsten. They agree but secretly mix Steve's sperm in. Rick and Steve consider a threesome to spice up their relationship.
2	"Bush Baby"	July 17, 2007
Rick and Steve see a marriage counselor who advises them to involve each other in their hobbies. Dana and Kirsten baby-sit "Echinacea" for friends Ebony and Ivory and are horrified when Echinacea's first word is "Bush."
3	"Damn Straights"	July 24, 2007
After accidentally splashing sperm on herself last episode, Dana is pregnant. Steve's parents come for a visit but refuse to believe that Rick is a man. Evan must leave West Lahunga Beach in search of medical marijuana.
4	"It's Raining Pussy"	July 31, 2007
After her 17th boyfriend comes out, Rick and Steve's friend Condi makes her 17th suicide attempt, then tries to steal Evan away from Chuck. Meanwhile, Pussy organizes the neighborhood cats in a vendetta against Dana after the boys turn Pussy's room into a nursery.
5	"Save Our Seamen"	August 7, 2007
The gang all go on a "Cruisey Cruise" family cruise to bond. On board, they must deal with Rick's ex-boyfriend Hunter, stowaway Condi, "Mommy Boot Camp" and being marooned on an iceberg.
6	"Hormonally Yours"	August 14, 2007
Dana and Rick go into hormone-induced hazes, Dana from pregnancy and Rick from an herbal steroid. Dana becomes sweet but obsesses over baby-proofing. Rick obsesses over being "skinny-fat" and working out and becomes uncontrollably horny. Meanwhile, Steve tries to expand his business by meeting the local Log Cabin Republicans, but accidentally winds up at a "K K Gay" meeting instead. Dana snaps out of it just in time to go into labor.

=== Season 2 (2008–09) ===
No.	Title	Original release date
7	"Labor Days"	November 11, 2008
Dana's labor continues and Kirsten asks Rick and Steve to help choose a baby name. Rick insists that the baby not share the name of any of Steve's tricks, but then discovers that Rick has a whole trunk full of sexual souvenirs. Evan tapes part of Dana's labor and it becomes a MyTube sensation, but when he attends a bloggers' convention and is dismissed as a "one-billion hit wonder" by Perez Hilton and Arianna Huffington, he starts to film even more outrageous videos to keep his celebrity status alive. Dana's parents convince Dana to name the baby in memory of her deceased brother Dick — but after 17 days of labor, Dana gives birth to a girl whom she names Dixie after her brother's drag persona.
8	"Wickeder"	November 18, 2008
After being caught in a tornado while bringing Dixie home from the hospital, the group lands in the middle of a cornfield and promptly runs out of gas. Steve and Dana walk to Emerald Joe's for gas while Kirsten and Rick read Dixie a "queer revisionist" version of The Wizard of Oz. Condi appears as the Crow-hag, Chuck as the Tin Man and Evan as the Cowardly Twink, while Steve and Dana spar over which one's Dorothy and which one's Toto. Kirsten worries that Dixie is bonding with everyone but her. Guest stars Jm J. Bullock as Emerald Joe and Jacques-Jean, the leader of Felatia's squad of flying French Canadian mimes.
9	"Mom Fight"	November 25, 2008
Rick and Steve's mothers both show up for Mother’s Day, and it's a case of hate at first sight. Dana and Kirsten feud over Mother’s Day after Rick and Steve buy them a gift certificate to a mommy spa, but eventually reconcile by inventing their own Mother's Day tradition. After Evan challenges Chuck to actually go out and pick up a guy on their "night off", Chuck has the most incredible sex of his life — with a woman. Evan tries to have revenge sex with Condi, but he's so gay that he has to try the ex-gay movement just to get it up.
10	"Death of a Lesbian Bed"	December 2, 2008
After their friends Ebony and Ivory go through lesbian bed death, Dana fears that Kirsten isn't attracted to her anymore because she's still fat from the pregnancy. The boys and Condi go on a tour of Underground West Lahunga Beach, and discover that Lance Bass (playing himself) is guarding the secret history of the gay ghetto.
11	"Swallowing Pride"	December 16, 2008
The gang go to San Francisco for Gay Pride. While there, Chuck decides to do everything he's ever wanted to do before he dies, but Evan fears there'll be no money left if Chuck spends it all and finds ways to help Chuck do it all for free. The others find out that their virtually normal lives are considered stereotypes by the radical San Francisco gays, and are exiled from the Castro. However, they discover that another onetime exile is planning to wreak vengeance on the city by blowing it up as soon as Mayor Gavin Screwsome (guest star George Takei) finishes his proclamation speech, and must come together to foil the plot.
12	"House of Race Cards"	January 6, 2009
After comparing his in-laws to Gorillas in the Mist, Steve tries to reassure himself that he's not racist. His African American gym partner Tyler (guest star RuPaul) isn't inclined to give the benefit of the doubt to either Steve or their straight gym buddy J.P. (guest star Darryl Stephens) — who says he's not homophobic, but avoids taking a shower after working out so the gay guys don't see him naked — and takes them both to a black gay bar in South Lahunga Beach so they'll confront their unconscious prejudices. Pussy lures Dixie out of the nursery in an attempt to get rid of her, and Kirsten fears that she might be the world's worst mother as she scrambles to find the baby.
13	"The Only Straight in the Village"	January 13, 2009
Tabloid celebrities Gina Michaels (Tori Spelling) and Manfred Dax (Jason Lewis) have moved to West Lahunga Beach after being released from rehab, threatening Condi's status as the only straight in the village. After Anderson Pooper airs a news report claiming that lesbian gangs are terrorizing West Lahunga, Dana and several of her friends confront him to demand a retraction. Kirsten and Rick take Dixie for her first doctor checkup after discovering that she appears to have unusual superpowers.
14	"Married Christmess"	January 27, 2009
Series finale. When the bill for Dixie's doctor's appointment arrives, Dana and Steve reluctantly agree to have a sham marriage so that Dixie can get onto Steve's health insurance—but Steve's mother is determined to turn it into the real thing. Homeland Security comes around to deport anybody with an accent, prompting Chuck to help Evan's mother look and sound more conventionally American. The series ends on a cliffhanger when Dr. Nerdlinger arrives with the results of Dixie's paternity test—is the father Rick, Steve or somebody else?

== Production and release ==
After the first season aired, Logo renewed the program for a second season, which debuted on November 11, 2008. The show is produced by Toronto-based production studio, Cuppa Coffee Studios.

The animation of the original Rick & Steve shorts was done using Lego blocks and figures, prompting a lawsuit from the company. Though the series no longer uses Lego blocks, it still draws comparison to both them and those by Playmobil.

=== Home release ===
Title	Release date		
Title	Region 1	Region 2	Region 4
Season 1	August 28, 2007	October 27, 2008	March 19, 2009
Season 2	March 3, 2009	TBA	October 15, 2009

== Reception ==
The show is noted particularly for its use of an adult-oriented and "politically incorrect" style of humor, similar in some respects to that of South Park and Family Guy.

=== Awards ===
A minor controversy arose in 2008 when Carlo Nardello, an executive with the Italian RAI Television network, criticized Salerno's Cartoons on the Bay animation festival for including a Rick & Steve screening in its 2008 program. However, Rick & Steve went on to win the festival's Pulcinella Award for best series of the year.

Casting director Gillian O'Neill won the Casting Society of America's Atrios Award for Outstanding Achievement in Casting - Animation TV Programming in 2008 for her work on Rick & Steve.
