= Glenn Gaylord =

American film director

Glenn Gaylord is an American film and television director, producer and screenwriter. His credits include the feature films Eating Out 3: All You Can Eat, Leave It on the Floor, Lez Be Friends and I Do, the documentary Camp Michael Jackson, the short films Boychick, Hungry Man, Lost Cause, and Little BFFs, and episodes of the television series What Perez Sez, Tori & Dean: Inn Love and Queer Eye for the Straight Girl.

I Do has won 12 film festival awards and North American theatrical release on May 31, 2013. He is a fellow of the Film Independent Screenwriter Lab with Directed By Dorothy Arzner, a script he co-wrote with Christine J. Russo.

Openly gay, he was an HIV/AIDS educator with AIDS Project Los Angeles before beginning to work in film and television.
