= Eating Out: Drama Camp =

2011 film by Q. Allan Brocka

- Theatrical release poster
- Directed by: Q. Allan Brocka
- Written by: Q. Allan Brocka; Phillip J. Bartell
- Produced by: Q. Allan Brocka; Michael Jack Shoel
- Starring: Chris Salvatore; Daniel Skelton; Aaron Milo; Lilach Mendelovich; Harmony Santana; Garikayi Mutambirwa; Drew Droege; Ronnie Kroell; Mink Stole; Steven Daigle; Rebekah Kochan
- Cinematography: Amanda Treyz
- Edited by: Phillip J. Bartell
- Music by: Meiro Stamm
- Production companies: Ariztical Entertainment; EOSS Productions; Logo Films
- Distributed by: Ariztical Entertainment
- Release date: July 1, 2011
- Running time: 96 minutes
- Country: United States
- Language: English

Eating Out: Drama Camp is a 2011 American sex comedy film and the fourth installment in the Eating Out film series. The film was directed by Q. Allan Brocka, who co-wrote it with Phillip J. Bartell.

== Plot ==
Filmmaker Jason (Garikayi Mutambirwa) is shooting a film featuring Zack (Chris Salvatore). Upon learning of a drama camp owned by Dick Dickey (Drew Droege), the pair apply along with Zack's boyfriend Casey (Daniel Skelton). Their applications are all successful and the group travel to the drama camp. At camp they meet Benji (Aaron Milo), an attractive camper who insists that he is not gay; Penny (Lilach Mendelovich), a sweet camp help who is an aspiring actress; Lily (Harmony Santana), a headstrong trans woman; and Genieveve (Marikah Cunningham), a rich and untalented actress who likes Benji. At orientation Dick enforces a no-sex rule at the camp—much due to Dick himself not having had sex for seven and a half years.

Jason confronts Benji about his sexuality who admits he is gay, but is lying due to his attraction to Zack despite him being in a relationship with Casey. Benji and Zack continue to bond, including Zack choosing to be partners with Benji instead of Casey during a class taught by Tiffani (Rebekah Kochan), resulting in Zack and Casey beginning to drift from one another. Casey becomes suspicious of Benji's sexuality when he refuses to kiss Genevieve in a class, and so enlists the help of Penny to help. The pair stumble upon Conor (Steven Daigle) about to engage in sex with another camper and blackmail him into a trap to find if Benji is gay, but this fails.

Meanwhile, Jason begins to produce a rendition of The Taming of the Shrew. He casts Zack and Benji in the leading roles, in which they share a kiss, and Lilly in the lead female role. Lilly, initially happy, gets mixed messages about Jason's personal feelings for her. As rehearsals begin, Casey becomes increasingly dissatisfied with his relationship with Zack, leading to Penny secretly rubbing Zack with poison oak so he can not rehearse. Casey stands in for Zack, and is shocked to find Benji becomes sexually aroused during their kiss. At first worried, Casey decides he and Zack are not meant to be together and the pair agree to break up, with Casey encouraging Zack to ask out Benji. However, Benji reveals to Zack he had been lying about his sexuality from the beginning, upsetting Zack.

As the night of the show arrives, the group do their final rehearsals. Lilly becomes enraged with Jason for not telling her if he likes her and angrily leaves. Jason chases after her before Zack and Benji rehearse their kissing scene. This quickly leads to the pair undressing one another with the encouragement of Casey who is attempting to get the right chemistry between the actors for the show. Dick discovers Zack and Benji and mistakes them for having sex and expels them from the camp. Realizing it is his fault, Casey asks Penny for help. They enlist the help of Conor once more who has sex with Dick in his office, loud enough for the whole camp to hear. After this Dick accepts sex in the camp and allows Zack and Benji to perform.

During the debut performance, Lilly breaks character and forces Jason to tell her if she likes him. He eventually admits he does and the pair make out on stage. Zack and Benji make up and start a relationship before beginning to make out too. Off stage Casey is happy to see Zack and Benji together, before he bumps into fellow camper Beau (Ronnie Kroell) who offers to be Casey's rebound. Casey agrees and all three pairs stumble on stage together before the curtain closes on the show. Dick awards the group with the best show and the prize of a vacation. Shortly after the new couples leave the drama camp.

== Cast ==
- Chris Salvatore as Zack Christopher
- Daniel Skelton as Casey
- Aaron Milo as Benji Aaron
- Lilach Mendelovich as Penny
- Harmony Santana as Lilly Veracruz
- Garikayi Mutambirwa as Jason
- Drew Droege as Dick Dickey
- Marikah Cunningham as Genieveve
- Ronnie Kroell as Beau
- Steven Daigle as Conor
- Rob Westin as Matty
- Mink Stole as Aunt Helen
- Rebekah Kochan as Tiffani von der Sloot

== Release ==
Eating Out: Drama Camp premiered in the United States on Logo on July 24, 2011; this version has the nudity censored and can be found on Netflix. The unedited film was released on DVD on October 25, 2011.
