= Mink Stole =

American actress

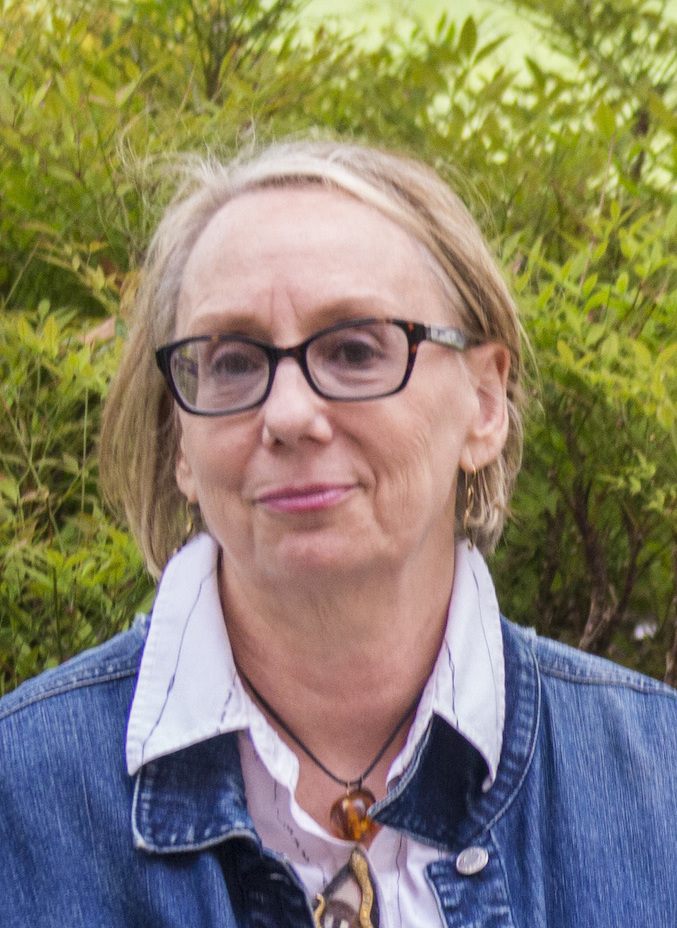
- Stole in 2014
- Born: Nancy Paine Stoll; August 25, 1947 (age 79); Baltimore, Maryland, U.S.
- Years active: 1966–present
- Website: www.minkstole.com

Nancy Paine Stoll (born August 25, 1947), known professionally as Mink Stole, is an American actress from Baltimore, Maryland. She began her career working for director John Waters, and has appeared in all of his feature films to date (a distinction shared only with Mary Vivian Pearce and Pat Moran). Her extensive work with Waters has made her one of the Dreamlanders, Waters's ensemble of regular cast and crew members.

== Biography ==
She was born into a large Roman Catholic family, and has nine siblings, including children's-book author Ellen Stoll Walsh and sculptor George Stoll. Her father, Joseph A. Stoll, died in 1955, and her mother, Nell, remarried twice, resulting in an extensive step-family.

Stole has performed in most of the films directed by close friend John Waters. Her film career began as a party guest in Waters's film Roman Candles. As of 2023, she has appeared in all of his feature films up to and including 2004's A Dirty Shame. She has appeared in a number of films and television shows, and wrote a column for the Baltimore City Paper titled "Think Mink" until mid-April 2006. She is the lead singer of Mink Stole and Her Wonderful Band, of which musicians Kristian Hoffman, George Baby Woods, and Brian Grillo have been members. The Baltimore incarnation of Mink Stole and Her Wonderful Band (2009–present) includes Scott Wallace Brown (piano, organ), Walker Teret (upright bass, guitar), Skizz Cyzyk (drums), and John Irvine (trumpet).

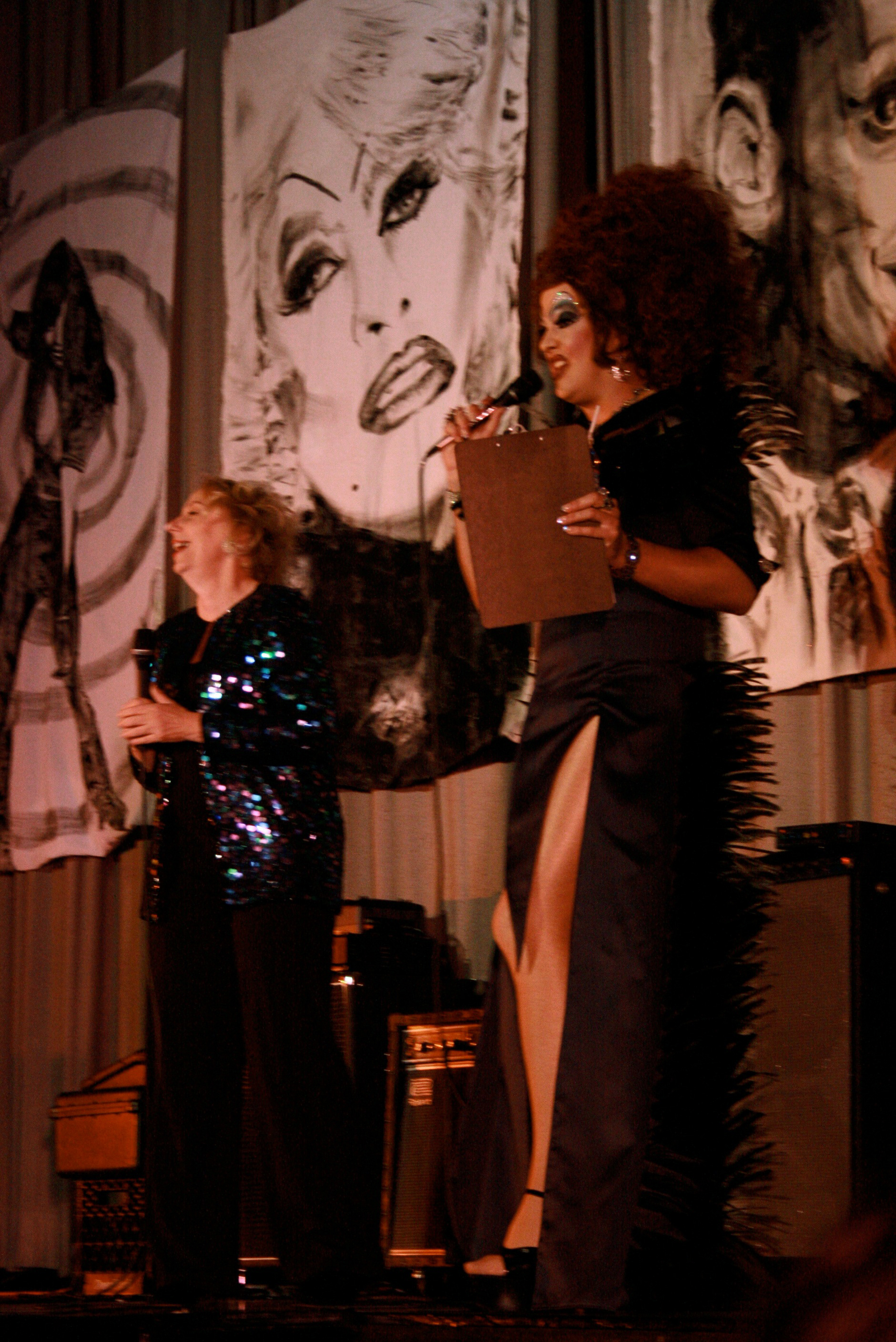
Mink Stole with Peaches Christ at a 2007 showing of Desperate Living

In 1999, Stole appeared in the satirical lesbian film But I'm a Cheerleader alongside Natasha Lyonne in the role of Megan's mother. In April 2009, Stole connected with cult director Steve Balderson for Stuck!, an homage to film noir women in prison dramas. Co-starring Karen Black, Pleasant Gehman and Jane Wiedlin, Stuck! was filmed in Macon, Georgia. Stole played Esther, a religious inmate sentenced to death. She once again co-starred with Natasha Lyonne in Joshua Grannell's All About Evil.

She received a Lifetime Achievement Award at the 2010 Boston Underground Film Festival in Cambridge following the East Coast Premiere of Stuck! on March 27, 2010. In 2011 she successfully completed a Kickstarter fundraising project to finance her first CD, titled Do Re MiNK. The CD was released on May 23, 2013.

== Personal life ==
Mink Stole lives in Baltimore, and also has a second home in the Los Angeles area. She performs weddings as an ordained minister of the Universal Life Church.

== Filmography ==
=== Film ===
Year	Title	Role	Notes
1966	Roman Candles	Party guest	
1969	Mondo Trasho	Homeless woman; Asylum inmate; Snob #1	
1970	Multiple Maniacs	Mink; Cavalcade patron	
1972	Pink Flamingos	Connie Marble	
1974	Female Trouble	Taffy Davenport	
1975	Love Letter to Edie	Blonde wicked stepsister	
1977	Desperate Living	Peggy Gravel	
1981	Polyester	Sandra Sullivan	
1988	Hairspray	Tammy Turner	
1990	Cry-Baby	Mrs. Malnorowski	
1991	Liquid Dreams	Felix	
1994	Serial Mom	Dottie Hinkle	
1995	Monster Mash: The Movie	Wolfie's mother	
1995	The Crazysitter	The Nurse	
1995	A Bucket of Blood	Old woman	
1997	Pink as the Day She Was Born	Vera	
1997	Lost Highway	Jury forewoman	Voice
1997	Leather Jacket Love Story	Martine	
1997	The Seller	Aunt Betty	
1998	Divine Trash	Herself	Documentary
1998	Anarchy TV	Ms. Dickman	
1998	The Treat	Manageress	
1998	Pecker	Precinct Captain	
1999	Splendor	Casting director	
1999	But I'm A Cheerleader	Nancy Bloomfield	
1999	Forever Fabulous	Miss Vi Ambrose	
2000	In Bad Taste	Herself	Documentary
2000	Cecil B. DeMented	Mrs. Sylvia Mallory	
2000	The Rowdy Girls	Amanda	
2000	Shriek If You Know What I Did Last Friday the 13th	Madame La Tourneau	
2001	Ring of Darkness	Fletcher	
2004	Girl Play	Robin's mother	
2004	A Dirty Shame	Marge the Neuter	
2005	Flirting with Anthony	Psychic	
2006	Another Gay Movie	Sloppi Seconds	Scenes deleted
2006	Eating Out 2: Sloppy Seconds	Helen	
2007	Out at the Wedding	Sunny	
2007	Sunny & Share Love You	School secretary Stole	
2007	Pieces of Dolores	Mrs. Fletcher	Short film
2008	3 Stories About Evil	Pat Peeters	Short film
2009	Eating Out 3: All You Can Eat	Aunt Helen	
2010	Stuck!	Esther	
2010	All About Evil	Evelyn	
2010	Bugbaby	Mrs. Tottifot	Short film Winner "Best Horror Short", 2011 Phoenix Film Festival; Winner "Best Supporting Actress", 2012 Pollygrind International Film Festival
2011	Eating Out 4: Drama Camp	Aunt Helen	
2012	Eating Out 5: The Open Weekend	Aunt Helen	
2013	I Am Divine	Herself	Documentary

=== Television ===
Year	Title	Role	Notes
1990	Get a Life	Mrs. Wilson	1 episode
1995–1996	The Secret World of Alex Mack	Mrs. Ward	3 episodes
1997	Married... with Children	Edna	1 episode
2001	Spyder Games	Merna Young	1 episode
2016	Difficult People		1 episode

== Discography ==
=== Studio albums ===
List of studio albums, with selected details
Title	Details
Do Re Mink	Released: May 23, 2013; Label: Self-released
