= Eating Out: The Open Weekend =

2012 film by Q. Allan Brocka

- DVD cover
- Directed by: Q. Allan Brocka
- Written by: Phillip J. Bartell; Q. Allan Brocka
- Produced by: Q. Allan Brocka; Michael Jack Shoel
- Starring: Chris Salvatore; Daniel Skelton; Aaron Milo; Lilach Mendelovich; Harmony Santana; Michael Vara; Alvaro Orlando; Jennifer Elise Cox; Ralph Cole Jr. Mink Stole; Rebekah Kochan
- Cinematography: Amanda Treyz
- Edited by: Phillip J. Bartell
- Music by: Meiro Stamm
- Production companies: Ariztical Entertainment; EOSS Productions; Logo Films
- Distributed by: Ariztical Entertainment
- Release dates: October 8, 2011 (Tokyo International Lesbian & Gay Film Festival); March 20, 2012 (United States; DVD)
- Running time: 82 minutes
- Country: United States
- Language: English

Eating Out: The Open Weekend is a 2011 American sex comedy film and the fifth and final installment in the Eating Out film series. The film was directed by Q. Allan Brocka, who co-wrote it with Phillip J. Bartell. It was released on DVD in the United States on March 20, 2012.

Only Rebekah Kochan has appeared in all five films.

== Plot ==
Zack (Chris Salvatore) and his new boyfriend Benji (Aaron Milo) are setting off to vacation at an all-male resort in Palm Springs, California, with their friend Lily (Harmony Santana). In light of the veritable smorgasbord of available men that are sure to be awaiting their arrival, Benji has proposed that he and Zack open up their relationship, just for the weekend. He is not ready to limit himself sexually and explains that this will be a good way for them to explore together. Zack is less than thrilled with the idea, but he's eager to keep Benji happy and, after all, he likes sex too. At the same time, Zack's ex, Casey (Daniel Skelton), is making his way to the same resort with his hag-in-training, Penny (Lilach Mendelovich). Knowing that Zack will be there with his new boyfriend, Casey immediately goes into panic mode, recruiting his new friend, Peter (Michael Vara), to be his pretend boyfriend for the weekend, proving to Zack that he has had no trouble moving on from their relationship. However, it is not long before all plans go awry, and Benji starts making eyes at Peter, while Zack realizes he might not be as over Casey as he'd thought. With the gay boys otherwise engaged, Lily and Penny are soon locked in combat for the attention of Luis, the resort's sexy bartender, who also happens to be the sole straight man in sight.

== Cast ==
- Chris Salvatore as Zack Christopher
- Daniel Skelton as Casey
- Aaron Milo as Benji Aaron
- Lilach Mendelovich as Penny
- Harmony Santana as Lilly Veracruz
- Michael Vara as Peter
- Alvaro Orlando as Luis
- Jennifer Elise Cox as hotel clerk
- Ralph Cole Jr. as Jerry
- Mink Stole as Aunt Helen
- Rebekah Kochan as Tiffani von der Sloot
- Chris Puckett as Congressman Piel
