= Ryan Carnes =

American actor (born 1982)

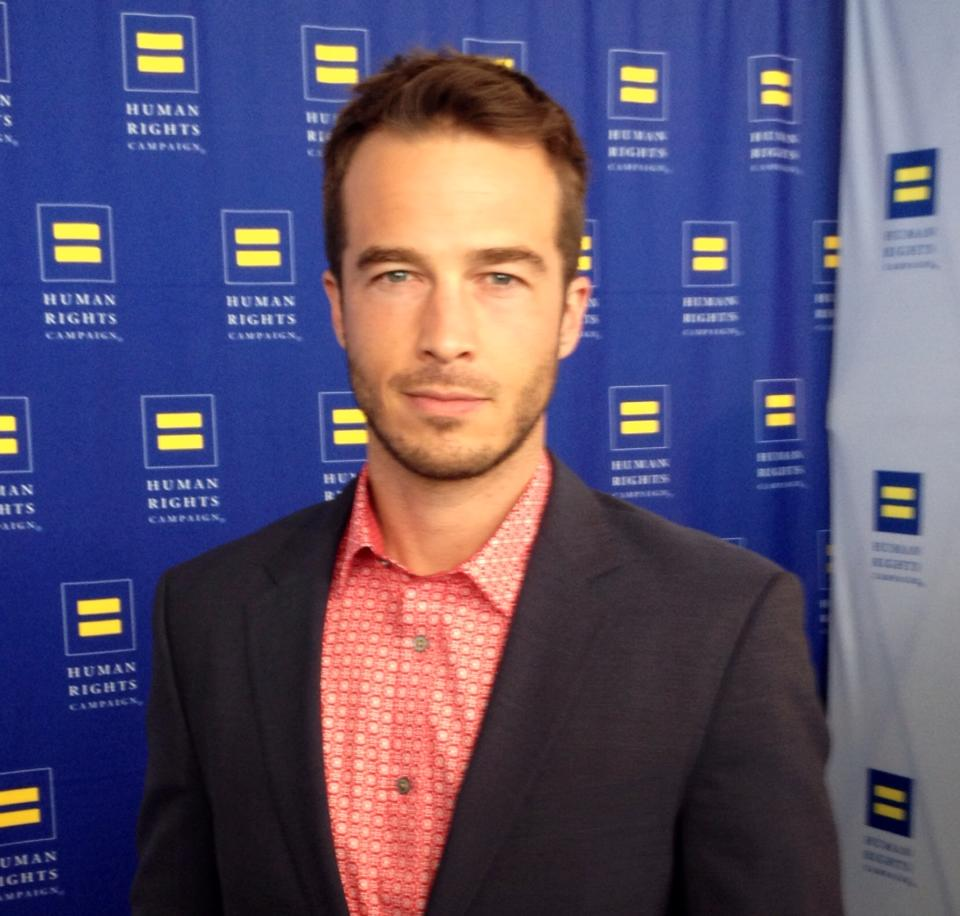
- Carnes in 2015
- Born: Ryan Gregg Carnes; November 21, 1982 (age 43); Pittsfield, Illinois, U.S.
- Occupation: Actor
- Years active: 2004–present

Ryan Gregg Carnes (born November 21, 1982) is an American actor. He is most known for playing the adult Lucas Jones on the ABC soap opera General Hospital.

== Career ==
Born in Pittsfield, Illinois, he attended Duke University, where he was a member of the Duke University Marching Band.

In 2003, Carnes was part of a national campaign for Nintendo. Carnes first started acting in 2004 when he became the ninth actor to portray Lucas Jones on the ABC opera General Hospital from July 2004 until September 2005. After he left General Hospital, he was replaced by Ben Hogestyn. From 2004 to 2006, Carnes had a recurring role on Desperate Housewives as Justin, the love interest of Andrew Van de Kamp, played by Shawn Pyfrom. Carnes starred in the 2004 film Eating Out and the 2006 film Surf School. He also starred in the video for the song "Mistake" by Australian actress and singer Stephanie McIntosh.

Carnes appeared in two episodes of the British science-fiction drama series Doctor Who in "Daleks in Manhattan" and "Evolution of the Daleks", in which he played 'Laszlo', who was turned into a half-human, half-pig slave. In the 2008 horror film Trailer Park of Terror, based on the Imperium comic series of the same name, Carnes plays an arrogant teenager called Alex. He also starred as the title character in the Syfy miniseries The Phantom, based on Lee Falk's comic strip of the same name.

It was reported on December 11, 2013, that Carnes would reprise the role of Lucas on General Hospital, returning on January 17, 2014. He then returned for short periods in 2017 and again as from 2018 onward on contract. Carnes left General Hospital in March 2020, and the role was recast in November. Carnes returned as Lucas Jones on General Hospital in January 2024 for the funeral of Bobbie Spencer, Lucas's mother.

== Filmography ==
Film
Year	Title	Role	Notes
2004	Eating Out	Marc Everhard	
2006	Surf School	Tyler	
2006	Letters from Iwo Jima	Marine at clearing	
2008	Trailer Park of Terror	Alex	
2008	Leaving Barstow	Cody	
2008	The Sno Cone Stand Inc	Sonny O'Day	
2010	Anderson's Cross	David	
2010	Suicide Dolls	Tyler	
2011	Stupid Questions	Memphis	Short film
2018	Beyond the Sky	Chris Norton	
2018	La Boda de Valentina	Jason	
2019	Red Handed	Gus	
2019	Acceleration	David	
2022	Valentino, Be Your Own Hero Or Villain	Steve	
2024	The Air He Breathes	Tristan Cole	
2025	A Cherry Pie Christmas	Mitch Henrickson	

Television
Year	Title	Role	Notes
2004–2005; 2014–2020, 2024	General Hospital	Lucas Jones; Phil Brewer	Role held: July 8, 2004–September 21, 2005; January 17, 2014–March 23, 2020; January 10-11, 2024
2004–2006	Desperate Housewives	Justin	11 episodes
2005	The Closer	Austin Phillips	Episode: "Good Housekeeping"
2005	CSI: NY	Nigel Ballantyne	Episode: "Youngblood"
2005	Thicker than Water	Tim "Ray" Markus	Television film
2007	CSI: Miami	Ross Miller	Episode: "Bloodline"
2007	Doctor Who	Laszlo	2 episodes: "Daleks in Manhattan" and "Evolution of the Daleks"
2008	Saving Grace	Joe Nathan	Episode: "Are You an Indian Princess?"
2008	Samantha Who?	Brent	Episode: "Out of Africa"
2010	The Phantom	Chris Moore/Kit Walker/The Phantom	Miniseries; 2 episodes
2010	Class	Alex Bianco	Television film
2011	Bones	Brody Mannings	Episode: "The Body in the Bag"
2011	NCIS	Bryce Leitner	Episode: "Two-Faced"
2011	Blackout	Dr. Ben Westen	Miniseries; 3 episodes
2012	Rizzoli & Isles	Dan MacKenzie	Episode: "Over/Under"
2014	Suburgatory	Bart	Episode: "About a Boy-Yoi-Yoing"
2017–2018	Keeping It 100	Dr. Sean	2 episodes; TV short
2018	The Neighborhood Nightmare	Brody	Television film
2020	Psycho Sister-In-Law	Reid	Television film

Music videos
Year	Title	Artist	Role
2006	"Mistake"	Stephanie McIntosh	Love interest
2018	"Me Lloras"	Gloria Trevi	Unfaithful Husband
