= Lisa Wiegand =

American cinematographer

- Born: Lisa Marie Wiegand; October 20, 1968 (age 57); Royal Oak, Michigan, U.S.
- Education: Wayne State University; University of California, Los Angeles
- Occupation: Cinematographer
- Years active: 1995–present

Lisa Marie Wiegand, ASC (born October 20, 1968) is an American cinematographer.

== Biography ==
Lisa Marie Wiegand was born in 1968 in Royal Oak, Michigan, USA. She graduated in 1989 from Wayne State University, and obtained her MFA in cinematography from UCLA in 1998. In 1995, she received a Master's in Cinematography from the American Film Institute AFI.

Wiegand started in taking stills and developing them in her father's darkroom as a child. She switched to motion capture when she started shooting local cable TV ads. She went on to direct multi-camera shoots on commercials and industrial films while working at Detroit's Midwest Video.

Wiegand has been featured, several times, in American Cinematographer Magazine and has been awarded for 'Excellence in Cinematography' by the American Society of Cinematographers."

Wiegand taught cinematography at The American Film Institute, UCLA, and Loyola Marymount University for several years. She also volunteers her skills to the Sundance Institute's Filmmaker's Labs.

== Awards ==
- 1998 won the ASC Karl Struss Heritage Award at the American Society of Cinematographers, USA
- 1999 won the ASC UCLA FF Award at the American Society of Cinematographers, USA for Jornada del Muerto.

== Filmography ==
Year	Title	Role	Notes
2016	Detroiters (TV Movie)		
2016	American Crime		
2012	Chicago Fire		
2012	Wedding Band TV series		
2011	Necessary Roughness		
2011	Detroit 1-8-7		
2010	The Assignment		
2009	Mayfly		
2009	Dollhouse		
2009	Sundance Directors Lab		
2008	My Suicide (Note: As a director of photography)		
2008	Jennie Tran (Not Her Real Name)		
2008	Night Life	Television	
2008	Cornelius		
2008	Adventures of Power		
2007	Ode to Lost Love		
2007	Lez Be Friends		
2007	Casting Pearls		
2007	A Little Night Fright		
2007	Chasing Ghosts: Beyond the Arcade		
2006	Eating Out 2: Sloppy Seconds		aka Eating Out 2: Different Rocks (USA: DVD box title)
2005	The Bulls		
2005	Little Athens		
2005	Barbara Jean		
2004	Good Thing		
2004	Porno Valley	TV series	unknown episodes
2004	Cherry Bomb		
2003	Seventy		
2003	Totally Sexy Loser		
2003	Storyline Online	Television 3 episodes	"Dad, Are You the Toothfairy?"; "The Polar Express"; "When Pigasso Met Mootise"
2003	Scrambled		
2002	Roberta Loved		
2002	Outta Time		aka Out of Time (Europe) & The Courier
2001	Fish in a Barrel		
2000	Odessa		
2000	Dean Quixote		
1999	Boy Next Door		
1999	Eastside		
1999	Ugly People in LA		
1997	Shopping for Fangs		
