= Q. Allan Brocka =

American film director (born 1972)

- Born: Quenton Allan Brocka; 1972 (age 53–54); Guam
- Education: University of Washington; California Institute of the Arts
- Occupation: Film director
- Relatives: Lino Brocka (uncle)

Quenton Allan Brocka (born 1972) is an American television and film director based in West Hollywood, California. He has directed and written a number of feature films and has created an animated television series for the Logo cable network. He also writes a column for The Advocate.

== Personal life ==
Brocka was born and spent his childhood in Guam. His family moved to the mainland United States, settling in Parkland, Washington, where he attended Washington High School. He earned a degree in communications from the University of Washington in Seattle and went on to get a Masters in film from the California Institute of the Arts.

Brocka is of Filipino heritage and is openly gay. His uncle was Lino Brocka, a film director in the Philippines and an advocate for LGBT rights.

== Career and awards ==
At eight years old, Brocka began creating simple slide shows from photographs and adding soundtracks. At age nine, his mother, a saleswoman for Panasonic, brought home a video camera and Brocka began creating short films and sketch comedy. He found an early fascination with science fiction, but after seeing The Rocky Horror Picture Show and some John Waters films as a teen, he realized sexuality was a legitimate subject. While living in Seattle, he directed a queer public-access television show for several years.

In 1999, Brocka released the animated short Rick & Steve: The Happiest Gay Couple In All The World, the story of a lesbian couple and gay couple who dislike each other but decide to have a baby together. The short was done as a school project that Brocka then submitted to Spike and Mike's Sick and Twisted Festival of Animation. It went on be shown at seven different film festivals, where it won awards.

Brocka went on to create another short, Roberta Loved, a story of a morbidly obese woman who is fired from her job and learns she will die. Roberta Loved won another set of awards, and Brocka learned that his audience was willing to be disturbed by his subject matter, whether through humor (as in Rick and Steve) or drama (as in Roberta Loved and Seventy).

His next works were documentaries of popular culture: Porno Valley, a reality show featuring pornographic actresses from Vivid Entertainment and Camp Michael Jackson, about the encampment of fans and media outside the court trial of pop-music star Michael Jackson.

Brocka was approached by Ariztical Entertainment to create low-budget gay romances and he agreed. For the first film, Eating Out, Brocka reached out to American Idol contestant Jim Verraros, who had never previously acted, as a co-star. It went on to win several awards, including 2004 Best Feature at the San Francisco International Lesbian & Gay Film Festival. Eating Out has spawned four sequels: 2006's Eating Out 2: Sloppy Seconds and 2009's Eating Out All You Can Eat, neither of which included Brocka's direct involvement, and Eating Out: Drama Camp and Eating Out: The Open Weekend, both from 2011, which Brocka directed and co-wrote, also serving as producer for the former.

Boy Culture, Brocka's 2006 feature-length release, won more than a dozen awards at film festivals around the world, including Best Writing at the 2006 Outfest and Best Feature Film at Festival del Mar in Spain.

The Logo cable network later picked up Rick & Steve as an animated series, which aired from 2007 to 2009. Brocka also performed some of the show's voices.

== Filmography ==
=== Film ===
Year	Title	Director	Writer	Producer	Notes
2004	Eating Out	Yes	Yes	No	
2006	Boy Culture	Yes	Yes	No	Written for the screen by
2006	Eating Out 2: Sloppy Seconds	No	Yes	Yes	
2009	Eating Out: All You Can Eat	No	Yes	No	
2008	Noah's Arc: Jumping the Broom	No	Yes	No	Story by
2011	Eating Out: Drama Camp	Yes	Yes	Yes	
2011	Eating Out: The Open Weekend	Yes	Yes	Yes	
2017	Before I Got Famous	No	Yes	No	TV film
TBA	Love & Lockdown	Yes	No	No	

=== Television ===
Year	Title	Director	Writer	Producer	Notes
2006–2010	The Big Gay Sketch Show	No	Yes	No	
2007–2009	Rick & Steve: The Happiest Gay Couple in All the World	Yes	Yes	Yes	Creator; executive producer
2016	Shady Bunch	Yes	No	No	
2017	Before I Got Famous	Yes	Yes	No	Creator; developed by
2023	Boy Culture: Generation X	Yes	Yes	No	Creator

=== Shorts ===
Year	Title	Director	Writer	Producer	Notes
2024	EKG	Yes	No	No	
