= List of LGBTQ-related films of 2011 =

This is a list of lesbian, gay, bisexual, transgender or queer-related films released in 2011. It contains theatrically released films that deal with important gay, lesbian, bisexual, transgender or queer characters or issues and may have same-sex romance or relationships as a plot device.

== Films ==
Title	Director	Country	Genre	Cast	Notes
365 Without 377	Adele Tulli	India; Italy	Documentary	Beena, Pallav and Abheena	Section 377 of the Indian Penal Code criminalizes any sexual acts between consenting adults of the same sex, stigmatizing them as 'against the order of nature'. On 2 July 2009 the Delhi High Court passed a landmark judgment scrapped this clause, thus the Indian LGBTQ community in Bombay celebrate. It won the Turin LGBT Film Fest award in 2011.
Abrupt Decision	Paul Bright	United States	Drama	Steve Callahan, David LaDuca, Cynthia Schiebel, Jacquelyn Lies, Paul Bright, Peggy Mae Binn, Matthew Burnett	
The Advocate for Fagdom	Angélique Bosio	France	Documentary	Interviews with; Glenn Belverio, Bruce Benderson, Rick Castro, Jey Crisfar, Vaginal Davis, Richard Kern, Harmony Korine, Daniel Nicoletta, Javier Peres, Kembra Pfahler	About the work of queercore filmmaker Bruce LaBruce, with a title credited to Kurt Cobain
Albert Nobbs	Rodrigo García	United Kingdom; Ireland	Drama	Glenn Close, Mia Wasikowska, Aaron Taylor-Johnson (credited as Aaron Johnson), Janet McTeer, Pauline Collins, Brenda Fricker, Jonathan Rhys Meyers, Brendan Gleeson, Maria Doyle Kennedy, Mark Williams	Based on the play The Singular Life of Albert Nobbs by Simone Benmussa, which itself is based on a novella by George Moore; coincidentally, Close starred in the title role when the play premiered Off-Broadway in 1982
American Translation	Pascal Arnold, Jean-Marc Barr	France	Drama	Pierre Perrier, Lizzie Brocheré, Jean-Marc Barr, Gray Orsatelli, Marc Rioufol, Manon Klein, Arthur Harel, Thomas Rouer, Astrid Vermeulin, Pierre-Yves Kiebbe, Arnaud Koller, Zoe Schellenberg, Benjamin Bollen, Laurent Delbecque, Ionita Radu Georgescu, Djedje Apali, Ombeline of Lavenère	
Angel	Sebastiano d'Ayala Valva	France	Documentary	Angel is a former boxer from Ecuador, now a transsexual prostitute in France, also known as Mujeron (the big woman in Spanish)	Produced in 2009
(A)Sexual	Angela Tucker	United States	Documentary	Interviews with;David Jay (founder of asexuality.org), Professor Lori Brotto, Cynthia Graham (Clinical Psychologist, Kinsey Institute), Aliza, Antonia, Barb, Brian, Cole Brown, Cale Cesar, Elizabeth and Swank Ivy. With archive footage of Joy Behar, Tucker Carlson, Janeane Garofalo and Elisabeth Hasselbeck	
August	Eldar Rapaport	United States	Drama, romance	Murray Bartlett, Edward Conna, Adrian Gonzalez, Daniel Dugan, Kevin McShane, Hank Ignacio, Bernhard Forcher, Maria Chung, Brad Standley	Rapaport's first full-length effort
Absent (Ausente)	Marco Berger	Argentina	Drama	Carlos Echevarría, Javier De Pietro, Antonella Costa, Rocío Pavón, Alejandro Barbero	Winner of the 2011 Teddy Award for Best Feature Film
Bad Romance	François Chang	China	Romance, drama	Nranus Chen, Jason Lau, Hayden Leung, Will Bay, Chan Chan, François Chang, Macha Hsiao	
The Ballad of Genesis and Lady Jaye	Marie Losier	United States; Germany; United Kingdom; Netherlands; Belgium; France	Documentary	Genesis P-Orridge, Lady Jaye Breyer P-Orridge (his wife), Big Boy Breyer P'Orridge, Edley ODowd, David Max, Alice Genese, Markus Persson and Bryin Dall	Winner of the 2011 Teddy Award for Best Documentary
Beauty (Skoonheid)	Oliver Hermanus	South Africa; France; Germany	Drama	Deon Lotz, Roeline Daneel, Sue Diepeveen, Charlie Keegan, Albert Maritz, Michelle Scott	
Becoming Chaz	Fenton Bailey, Randy Barbato	United States	Documentary	Chaz Bono, Cher, Jennifer Elia (Chaz's girlfriend), Jimm Giannini (actress) and (transgender rights activist) Masen Davis	Premiered at the 2011 Sundance Film Festival
Blinders	Jacob Brown	United States	Short, drama	Nathaniel Brown, Byrdie Bell and Luke Worrall	Filmed over the Memorial Day weekend.
Break My Fall	Kanchi Wichmann	United Kingdom	Drama	Kat Redstone, Sophie Anderson, Kai Brandon Ly, Collin Clay Chace, Morgan Rhys, Yariv Perelmuter, Anthony Walker, Rob Schwarz, Timberlina, Chéo Rhodes	
Boys Village	Till Kleinert	United Kingdom; Germany	Short, drama, fantasy, horror	Benjamin Thorne, Andrew McQueen, Hannah-Rose Jones, Jack Jones, Owain Collins	22 minutes long, it was also released on DVD as part of the Peccadillo Pictures release Boys On Film X.
Bye Bye Blondie	Virginie Despentes	France	Comedy, drama	Emmanuelle Béart, Béatrice Dalle, Soko, Clara Ponsot, Pascal Greggory, Stomy Bugsy, Sasha Andres	
Buffering	Darren Flaxstone, Christian Martin	United Kingdom	Comedy	Alex Anthony, Conner Mckenzy, Jessica Matthews, Oliver Park, Bernie Hodges, Tony Banham and Ryan Spong	
Christopher and His Kind	Geoffrey Sax	United Kingdom	Drama	Matt Smith, Douglas Booth, Imogen Poots, Pip Carter, Toby Jones, Alexander Dreymon, Tom Wlaschiha, Issy van Randwyck	TV movie; based on Christopher Isherwood's memoir of the same name
Cibrâil – Eine Liebe in Berlin	Tor Iben	Germany	Drama	Sinan Hancili, Engin Sert, Martina Hesse, Peter Beck, Volker Figge, Oliver Weidner	aka The Visitor
Cinema Verite	Shari Springer Berman, Robert Pulcini	United States	Drama	Diane Lane, Tim Robbins, James Gandolfini, Kathleen Quinlan, Thomas Dekker, Patrick Fugit, Shanna Collins, Willam Belli, Lolita Davidovich, Kyle Riabko, Kaitlyn Dever, Nick Eversman, Johnny Simmons, Caitlin Custer, Jake Richardson	Fictionalized account of the production of An American Family
Circumstance	Maryam Keshavarz	United States; France; Iran	Drama	Nikohl Boosheri, Sarah Kazemy, Reza Sixo Safai, Keon Mohajeri	
Cloudburst	Thom Fitzgerald	United States; Canada	Adventure, comedy, drama	Olympia Dukakis, Brenda Fricker, Ryan Doucette, Kristin Booth, Michael McPhee, Jeremy Akerman, John Dunsworth, Gertrude Thoma, Lindsay Duncan, Perry Millward, Iddo Goldberg, Will Kemp, Stuart Graham	Adapted from Fitzgerald's play of the same name
Codependent Lesbian Space Alien Seeks Same	Madeleine Olnek	United States	Comedy, romance, science fiction	Lisa Haas, Susan Ziegler, Jackie Monahan, Cynthia Kaplan, Dennis Davis, Alex Karpovsky, Rae C. Wright and Clay Drinko	
Çürük - The Pink Report	Ulrike Böhnisch	Germany	Documentary	Four young gay men recount their experiences in the Turkish military and with the exemption process, which includes psychological tests, anal examinations and the photographical proof of gay sex	
Deep End	Bretten Hannam	Canada	Short, drama	Bailey Maughan, Gharrett Patrick Paon, Denis Theriault, Max Humphreys, Matt Tolton	8 minutes long
Desire Street	Roberto F. Canuto; Xu Xiaoxi	Spain; China; United States	Comedy, drama	Alexandra Smothers, Alejandra Walker, Ellen Clifford, Javier Lopez, Kjord Davis, Jesus Guevara	
Dicke Mädchen	Axel Ranisch	Germany	Drama, comedy	Ruth Bickelhaupt, Heiko Pinkowski, Peter Trabner, Paul Pinkowski	aka Heavy Girls
Downing	Ben Peters	United Kingdom	Short, drama	Jamie Brotherston, Ross William Wild, Krystina Coates, Rehanna MacDonald, Jack Hinks and Ling Law	16 minutes long
Eating Out: Drama Camp	Q. Allan Brocka	United States	Comedy	Chris Salvatore, Daniel Skelton, Aaron Milo, Lilach Mendelovich, Harmony Santana, Garikayi Mutambirwa, Drew Droege	
Eating Out: The Open Weekend	Q. Allan Brocka	United States	Comedy	Chris Salvatore, Daniel Skelton, Lilach Mendelovich, Harmony Santana, Michael Vara	
Facing Mirrors (Aynehaye Rooberoo)	Negar Azarbeyjani	Iran	Drama	Homayoun Ershadi, Shayesteh Irani, Nima Shahrokh Shahi, Qazal Shakeri	
Family Affair (Assunto de Família)	Caru Alves de Souza	Brazil	Short, drama	Kauê Telloli, Cláudia Assunção, Thiago Pinheiro, Ney Piacentini, Thiago Franco Balieiro and Johnnas Oliva	12 minutes long
Famine	Ryan Nicholson	Canada	Horror	Beth Cantor, Christine Wallace, Christopher Patrick Donoghue, Nathan Durec, Dustin Elkins, Karyn Halpin, Glenn Hoffmann	a.k.a. Stupid Teens Must Die! and Detention Night
Father's Day	Adam Brooks, Jeremy Gillespie, Matthew Kennedy, Steven Kostanski, Conor Sweeney	Canada	Horror	Adam Brooks, Matthew Kennedy, Conor Sweeney, Amy Groening, Mackenzie Murdock, Meredith Sweeney, Brent Neale, Garrett Hnatiuk, Kevin Anderson	
Finding Mr. Wright	Nancy Criss	United States	Comedy, Romance	Matthew Montgomery, Rebekah Kochan, David Shae, Jason Stuart, Scotch Ellis Loring, Edward Gusts	
The First Time (Bedingungslose Liebe)	Timmy Ehegötz	Germany	Drama	Florian Ahlborn, Timmy Ehegötz, Denise Ilktac, Bianca Prohl and Björn Suchla	
Fjellet (The Mountain)	Ole Giæver	Norway	Drama	Ellen Dorrit Petersen and Marte Magnusdotter Solem	
Funkytown	Daniel Roby	Canada	Drama	Patrick Huard, Justin Chatwin, Paul Doucet, Raymond Bouchard, Geneviève Brouillette, Sarah Mutch, François Letourneau, Sophie Cadieux, Romina D'Ugo	
Going Down in LA-LA Land	Casper Andreas	United States	Comedy, drama	Matthew Ludwinski, Allison Lane, Michael Medico	Based on Andy Zeffer's novel of the same name
The Green	Steven Williford	United States	Drama	Jason Butler Harner, Cheyenne Jackson, Illeana Douglas, Julia Ormond	
Gun Hill Road	Rashaad Ernesto Green	United States	Drama	Esai Morales, Judy Reyes, Harmony Santana, Isiah Whitlock Jr., Míriam Colón, Felix Solis, Franky G, Vincent Laresca, Robert Prescott, Robin de Jesús	
Heart Breaks Open	William Maria Rain	United States	Drama	Maximillian Davis, Brian Peters, Samonte Cruz	
Hit So Hard	P. David Ebersole	United States	Documentary	Interviews; Patty Schemel, Courtney Love (of Hole), Eric Erlandson (of Hole), Melissa Auf der Maur (of Hole), Nina Gordon (of Veruca Salt), Kate Schellenbach (of Luscious Jackson), Gina Schock (of The Go-Go's), Alice de Buhr (of Fanny), Debbi Peterson (of The Bangles), Izzy (of Care Bears on Fire), Phranc, Roddy Bottum (of Faith No More), Dallas Taylor, Sarah Vowell, Chris Whitemyer, Larry Schemel (of Midnight Movies), Terry Schemel, Joe Mama-Nitzberg and Kristen Pfaff. Also archival footage of; Kurt Cobain, Evan Dando, Dexter Holland, Leslie Mah, Sheri Ozeki, Fred Schneider, Jenny Shimizu, Pat Smear, and Metallica	
House of Tolerance	Bertrand Bonello	France	Drama	Céline Sallette, Hafsia Herzi, Jasmine Trinca, Adèle Haenel	a.k.a. L'Apollonide: Souvenirs de la maison close
I Am	Sonali Gulati	United States; India	Documentary		
I Want to Get Married	William Clift	United States	Comedy, romance	Matthew Montgomery, Ashleigh Sumner, Emrhys Cooper, Jane Wiedlin, Peter Stickles, Jessica Gardner, Lisa Franks	
J. Edgar	Clint Eastwood	United States	Drama	Leonardo DiCaprio, Naomi Watts, Armie Hammer, Josh Lucas, Judi Dench, Dermot Mulroney, Damon Herriman, Jeffrey Donovan, Ed Westwick, Zach Grenier, Ken Howard, Stephen Root, Denis O'Hare, Adam Driver, Geoff Pierson, Lea Thompson, Christopher Shyer, Miles Fisher, Jessica Hecht, Michael O'Neill, Christian Clemenson, Geoff Stults, Emily Alyn Lind, Amanda Schull	
Jamie and Jessie Are Not Together	Wendy Jo Carlton	United States	Comedy, musical, romance	Jax Jackson (billed as Jacqui Jackson), Jessica London-Shields, Fawzia Mirza, Marika Engelhardt, Laura Chernicky, Christopher Meister	Critic Roger Ebert noted the low-budget indie film was "charmingly written and acted". Danielle Riendeau stated it was the "funniest, most original lesbian films of the year".
Joe + Belle	Veronica Kedar	Israel	Comedy, crime, drama	Veronica Kedar, Sivan Levy, Romi Aboulafia, Yotam Ishay, Ra'anan Hefetz, Noa Provisor, Florence Bloch, Shalev Gelber, Nitai Gvirtz	
Judas Kiss	J.T. Tepnapa	Germany	Drama, science fiction	Charlie David, Richard Harmon, Sean Paul Lockhart, Timo Descamps	
Karuvarai Pookkal	IPS Xavier	India	Drama	Living Smile Vidya, Julia Robert, Pallavi	
Leave It on the Floor	Sheldon Larry	Canada; United States	Comedy, drama, musical	Ephraim Sykes, Andre Myers, Phillip Evelyn, Barbie-Q, Cameron Koa, James Alsop, Metra Dee, De'Markes Dogan	Features choreography by Frank Gatson Jr.
The Ledge	Michael Chapman	United States	Drama, thriller	Charlie Hunnam, Terrence Howard, Liv Tyler	
Let My People Go!	Mikael Buch	France	Comedy	Nicolas Maury, Carmen Maura, Jean-François Stévenin, Amira Casar, Clément Sibony, Jarkko Niemi, Jean-Luc Bideau, Didier Flamand, Kari Väänänen, Olavi Uusivirta, Aurore Clément, Michaël Abiteboul, Charlie Dupont	
Looking for Simon (Auf der Suche)	Jan Krüger	Germany; France	Drama	Corinna Harfouch, Nico Rogner, Mehdi Dehbi, Valérie Leroy, Trystan Pütter, Mireille Perrier, Géraldine Loup	
Lost in Paradise	Vũ Ngọc Đãng	Vietnam	Drama	Lương Mạnh Hải, Hồ Vĩnh Khoa, Linh Sơn, Phương Thanh, Hiếu Hiền, La Quoc Hung and Don Nguyen	
Love Actually... Sucks!	Scud	Hong Kong	Drama	Osman Hung	
Love Is All You Need?	Kim Rocco Shields	United States	Drama, short	Lexi DiBenedetto, Carrie Lazar, Sheri Levy, Dante Thorn	Later adapted into a full-length feature
Memories in March	Sanjoy Nag	India	Tragedy	Deepti Naval, Raima Sen, Rituparno Ghosh, Rajat Ganguly, Suchita Roy Chaudhury, Ekavali Khanna	Deepti Naval was Winner of Best Actress Award at the 2012 ImagineIndia Film Festival (in Spain),
Naked As We Came	Richard LeMay	United States	Drama	Benjamin Weaver, Karmine Alers, Lue McWilliams, Ryan Vigilant, Sturgis Adams and John Challice	
Narthagi	G. Vijayapadma	India	Drama	Kalki Subramaniam, Leema Babu, Girish Karnad, Suzane George, and Punnagai Poo Gheetha	
The Night Watch	Richard Laxton	United Kingdom	Drama, romance, war	Anna Maxwell Martin, Claire Foy, Jodie Whittaker, Harry Treadaway, Anna Wilson-Jones, JJ Feild, Liam Garrigan, Claudie Blakley, Kenneth Cranham	based novel by Sarah Waters, a 90-minute television adaptation, was shown on BBC2.
North Sea Texas	Bavo Defurne	Belgium	Drama	Jelle Florizoone, Mathias Vergels, Eva Van Der Gucht	Based on the novel Nooit gaat dit over by Andre Sollie
Notre Paradis	Gaël Morel	France	Drama	Stéphane Rideau, Dimitri Durdaine, Béatrice Dalle, Didier Flamand, Mathis Morisset, Malik Issolah	
On ne choisit pas sa famille	Christian Clavier	France	Adventure, comedy	Christian Clavier, Jean Reno, Muriel Robin, Héléna Noguerra, Michel Vuillermoz, Maily Florentin Dao	aka You Don't Choose Your Family
The One	Caytha Jentis	United States	Comedy, romance	Jon Prescott, Ian Novick, Margaret Anne Florence, David Albiero, Collin Biddle, Michael Billy	
Open	Jake Yuzna	United States	Drama	Gaea Gaddy	
The Parade	Srđan Dragojević	Serbia	Comedy, drama	Nikola Kojo, Miloš Samolov, Hristina Popović, Goran Jevtić, Goran Navojec, Dejan Aćimović, Toni Mihajlovski	
Pariah	Dee Rees	United States	Drama	Adepero Oduye, Aasha Davis, Charles Parnell, Kim Wayans	
The Perfect Family	Anne Renton	United States	Comedy, drama	Kathleen Turner, Emily Deschanel, Jason Ritter, Michael McGrady, Shannon Cochran, Sharon Lawrence, Angelique Cabral, Richard Chamberlain, Elizabeth Peña	
Private Romeo	Alan Brown	United States	Drama	Seth Numrich, Matt Doyle, Hale Appleman, Charlie Barnett	
Question One	Joseph Fox, James Nubile	United States	Documentary	Campaigners of both sides of the argument	On 6 May 2009, Maine, USA became the first state in USA to legislatively grant same-sex couples the right to marry. Seven months later, on 3 November 2009, Maine reversed, becoming the thirty-first state in USA to say 'no' to gay and lesbian marriage.
Romeos	Sabine Bernardi	Germany	Drama	Rick Okon, Maximilian Befort, Liv Lisa Fries, Felix Brocke	
Sal	James Franco	United States	Drama	Val Lauren, Jim Parrack, James Franco, Vince Jolivette, Trevor Neuhoff, Stacey Miller, Brian Goodman	
Señorita	Isabel Sandoval (Note: Credited as Vincent Sandoval.)	Philippines	Drama	Isabel Sandoval, Publio Briones III, Dominic Milano Palomo, Richard Manabat, Stella Palomo Monteño, Aya Ng and Eric Alvin Po	
Sexing the Transman	Buck Angel	United States	Documentary	Margaret Cho, Ian Harvie, Selene Luna and Lucas Silveira	
The Skin I Live In	Pedro Almodóvar	Spain	Thriller, drama	Antonio Banderas, Elena Anaya, Marisa Paredes, Jan Cornet, Roberto Álamo, Blanca Suárez, Susi Sánchez, Bárbara Lennie, Eduard Fernández, Concha Buika	Based on the novel Tarantula by Thierry Jonquet
Soulbound	Caio Sóh	Brazil	Drama	Emilio Dantas, Remo Rocha, Paloma Duarte, Roberto Bomtempo, Jayme Matarazzo, Graziella Schimitt, Cláudio Lins, Juliana Lohmann	
Spring	Hong Khaou	United Kingdom	Short, drama	Jonathan Keane and Chris O'Donnell	14mins long, was premiered at Sundance
Stadt Land Fluss	Benjamin Cantu	Germany	Drama	Lukas Steltner, Kai Michael Müller	Aka Harvest
The Strange Ones	Christopher Radcliff, Lauren Wolkstein	United States; France	Short, drama, mystery	Alex Pettyfer, James Freedson-Jackson, Emily Althaus, Gene Jones	
Suicide Room	Jan Komasa	Poland	Drama	Jakub Gierszał, Roma Gąsiorowska, Agata Kulesza, Krzysztof Pieczyński, Filip Bobek	
This Is What Love In Action Looks Like	Morgan Jon Fox	United States	Documentary	Zach Stark, gay protestors, former Love In Action clients, as well as the organization's Executive director, John Smid	About a Memphis teenager who was sent to a controversial Christian program after telling his parents that he was gay
Three Veils	Rolla Selbak	United States	Drama	Sheetal Sheth, Angela Zahra, Mercedes Mason (credited as Mercedes Masöhn), Madline Tabar, Erick Avari, Garen Boyajian, Christopher Maleki, Sammy Sheik	
Tomboy	Céline Sciamma	France	Drama	Zoé Héran, Malonn Levana, Sophie Cattani, Mathieu Demy, Jeanne Disson	Winner of the 2011 Teddy Award Jury Prize
Unhappy Birthday	Mark Harriott, Mike Matthews	United Kingdom	Drama, horror, mystery	David Paisley, Christina De Vallee, Jill Riddiford, Jonathan Keane	
Vito	Jeffrey Schwarz	United States	Documentary	Phyllis Antonellis (Vito's cousin), Richard Barrios (Author), Richard Berkowitz (Author), Lenny Bloom (Friend & Lawyer), Jay Blotcher(Journalist and activist), Reverend Malcolm Boyd, Joseph Brewer, with archive footage of Lee Brewster (activist), Edmund Bergler M.D. (Psychoanalyst, writer), Tom Brokaw (Journalist), Marcus A. Conant (Doctor and dermatologist), Stephen Boyd, Billie Burke, George Bancroft, Jane Darwell	About Vito Russo, gay activist, film scholar, and author of The Celluloid Closet premiered at the 2011 New York Film Festival,
Waited for	Nerina Penzhorn	South Africa	Documentary	three South African lesbian couples who adopt across racial lines	
Walk a Mile in My Pradas	Joey Sylvester	United States	Comedy	Nathaniel Marston, Tom Archdeacon, Tom Arnold, Mike Starr, Dee Wallace	
We 3 (Os 3)	Nando Olival	Brazil	Drama	Gabriel Godoy, Victor Mendes, Juliana Schalch, Sophia Reis	
We Once Were Tide	Jason Bradbury	United Kingdom	Short, drama	Alexander Scott, Tristan Bernays and Mandy Aldridge	18 mins long
A Wedding Most Strange	Trevor Garlick	United Kingdom	Drama, comedy	Chris Finch, Louise Houghton, Adz Hunter, Valary Sanders, Stephen Mcleod, Rupert Charmak, Catherine Mobley, Sukie Ghajminger, Chris Barritt, Stephen Walker	
Weekend	Andrew Haigh	United Kingdom	Drama, romance	Tom Cullen, Chris New	
Wetlands (Marécages)	Guy Édoin	Canada	Drama	Pascale Bussières, Gabriel Maillé, Luc Picard, François Papineau	
What You Looking At?	Faryal	United Kingdom	Short, comedy	Michael Twaits, Hussina Raja and Rez Kabir	Nominated for an Iris Prize in 2012
Wish Me Away	Bobbie Birleffi, Beverly Kopf	United States	Documentary	Brad Paisley, Stan Wright, Jennifer Wright, Russell Carter, Rodney Crowell, Victoria Wilson, Rev. C. Welton Gaddy, Don Cusic, Howard Bragman, Richard Sterban, Charlene Daniels, Chuck D. Walter, Rosie O'Donnell, Meredith Vieira, Natalie Morales	About country music singer and gay rights activist Chely Wright
With Every Heartbeat	Alexandra-Therese Keining	Sweden	Drama	Ruth Vega Fernandez, Liv Mjönes, Krister Henriksson, Lena Endre, Joakim Nätterqvist, Tom Ljungman, Josefin Tengblad	a.k.a. Kyss mig and Kiss Me
You and I	Roland Joffé	United States; Russia	Drama, romance, thriller	Mischa Barton, Anton Yelchin, Charlie Creed-Miles, Helena Mattsson	
You Should Meet My Son!	Keith Hartman	United States	Comedy	Joanne McGee, Carol Goans, Stewart Carrico, Ginger Pullman	
