= Caytha Jentis =

American writer, producer, and director

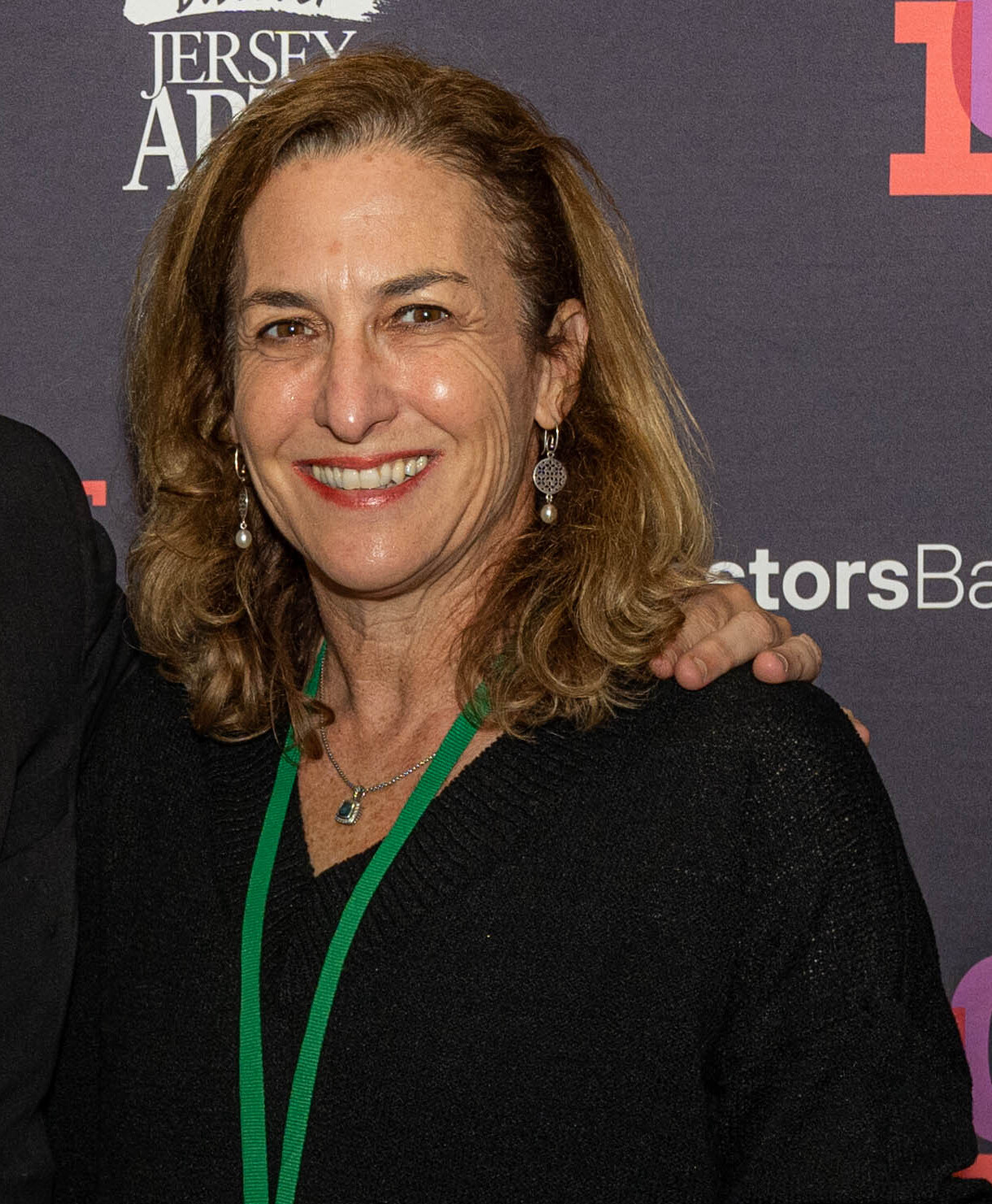
Jentis in 2021

Caytha Jentis is an American writer, producer, director and filmmaker. Jentis' feature films include Bad Parents, And Then Came Love and the coming out film The One, her directorial debut. She is the creator and director of The Other F Word, a comedy web series streaming on Amazon Prime, starring Steve Guttenberg and Judy Gold. Her production and management company, Fox Meadow Films, produced all three of her feature films and the web series The Other F Word. She also wrote and produced the short film Dream House in 2010. Jentis was selected as one of Good Housekeeping's 50 over 50 in 2016.

== Early life ==
Jentis graduated from Syracuse University's S. I. Newhouse School of Public Communications in 1984 with a degree in film and television. After graduating from Syracuse, Jentis moved to Los Angeles where she worked as a literary agent and in development; her first screenplay was for an ABC movie that never aired. While in California, Jentis had the first of two children while attending UCLA, where she completed her master's degree in 1996. She then moved back to the east coast, moving to Ridgewood, New Jersey where she lived for 20 years.

== Films ==
Jentis wrote and produced her first indie feature And Then Came Love in 2007, which stars Vanessa Williams, Ben Vereen and Eartha Kitt (in her final film appearance). The movie was filmed at her alma mater, Syracuse University, where the chancellor's suite in Lubin House was converted into the apartment where Williams’ character lived. Jentis gave university students the opportunity to be interns, assisting with pre-production and post-production activities.

Her directorial debut was in 2011 with the coming-out film The One, starring Jon Prescott, Margaret Anne Florence and Ian Novick, Jentis also produced and wrote the script for the movie. The film is a romantic dramedy about a man who plans to marry a woman, when a month before his wedding, he falls in love with a man from his past. Jentis said she wrote the screenplay "after spending several nights with friends discussing true love”, and it was the fastest script she had ever written.

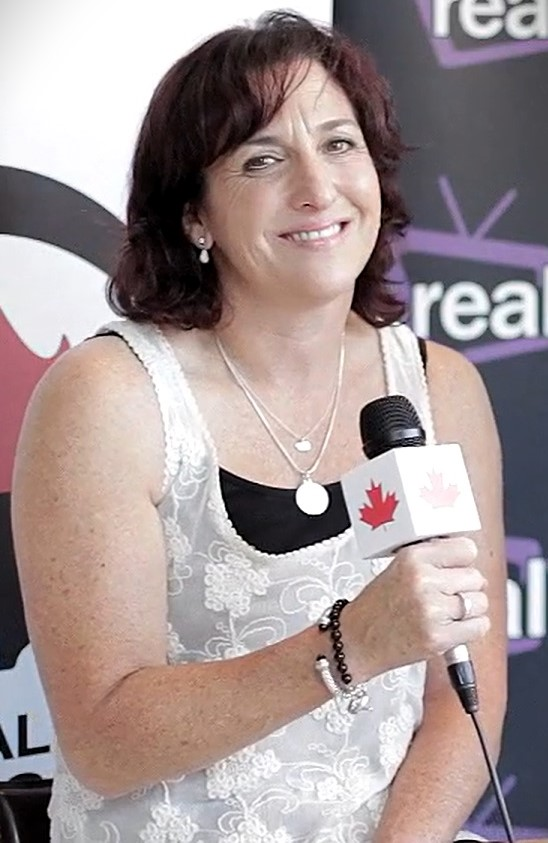
Jentis interviewed in 2012

Bad Parents, released in 2012, is based on her award-winning play It’s All About the Kids, (Note: Winner of the 2009 New Jersey Playwrights Contest. Play Like a Winner, an off-broadway play was also based on It’s All About the Kids and was the winner of the 2016 New York Musical Festival Developmental Reading Award) and was produced, written and directed by Jentis. The film stars Janeane Garofalo, Cheri Oteri and Kristen Johnston, and was inspired by Jentis' personal experiences as a soccer mom. The film was shot entirely in New Jersey and used several kids from local soccer teams in the area where Jentis once lived as talent for the feature. Jentis said making the film "was cathartic to go through," and it's "absurd behavior, but it's stuff that's not far from the truth". The movie won Best Feature Film in 2013 at the Hoboken International Film Festival.

Short films

In 2010 Jentis wrote and produced Dream House, a short directed by Darien Sills-Evans, that explores the dark side of the suburban dream.

== Web series ==
Jentis is the creator and director of The Other F Word, a comedy web series that premiered in September 2016 on Amazon Prime. The series is set in New York City, where Jentis now resides, and stars Steve Guttenberg, Judy Gold, Michael Boatman, Gilbert Gottfried and Reiko Aylesworth. The show is produced by her company, Fox Meadow Films, and follows four women aged 40 and 50-something, who are dealing with starting over after their kids are grown. The episodes are extremely short, with none running longer than 20 minutes. According to Jentis, the "F" in the show stands for being in your forties, fifty, friendship, fearless, family and fun. Jentis also went out of her way to include many commercial products in the series that were developed by women entrepreneurs. Season 1 was a top-ranked show on Amazon for over 4 months, season 2 premiered in September 2017.

== See also ==
- List of female film and television directors
- List of LGBT-related films directed by women
