= Fereshteh Taerpour =

Iranian film producer and writer (1953–2021)

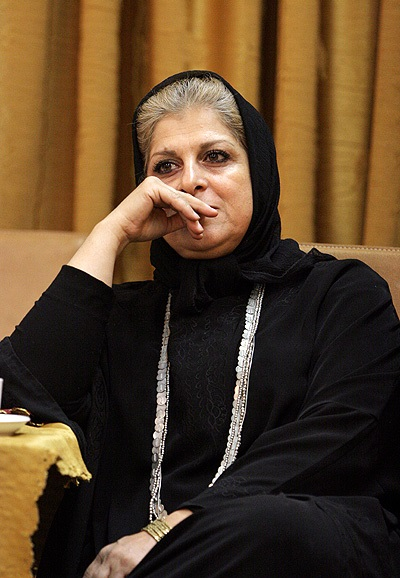
- Born: 21 January 1953; Tehran, Iran
- Died: 17 August 2021 (aged 68); Tehran, Iran
- Occupations: Film producer, writer
- Years active: 1982–2021
- Children: 3; including Ghazal

Fereshteh Taerpour (Persian: فرشته طائرپور; 4 February 1953 – 17 August 2021) was the first Iranian female independent film producer and writer.

== Career ==
In her 40-year career, Taerpour had worked as a journalist, writer, film producer, jury member, speaker, cultural event organizer and board member of Iranian film producers' associations. Taerpour was considered an iconic cultural figure in Iran and has produced more than 25 feature films, 50 documentaries and over 20.000 minutes of TV production.

As an International Film Producer, Taerpour has also worked as a co-producer or line-producer of more than 20 co-production with countries such as: US, Canada, Germany, Italy, Japan, France, Korea, England, Tunisia, Turkey etc. She has also served as a jury member at various National and International film festivals such as Frankfurt, Cairo, India, Montreal, Tehran, Isfahan, Hamadan. Fereshteh Taerpour was the co-founder and director of KHANEH (House of Literature & Art) since 1989.

From 1982 to 1991 she was the director of the Writing and Editorial Center in "KANOON", the Institute for the Intellectual Development of Children and Young Adults in Iran. From 1982 to 1991 she was the director of the Writing and Editorial Center in "KANOON", The Institute for the intellectual development of children and young adults in Iran. She has also translated and written several children's books, such Adventure of Ahmad and Sara, which has been translated in many languages including Japanese.

She is the first Iranian member she joined CIFEJ (The International Center of Films for Children and Young People) in 1994 and she was a CIFEJ Board of Director member between 2000 and 2002. She was also the first Iranian female filmmaker who served as the board of director chair of KHANEH CINEMA(The Iranian Alliance of Motion Guilds) 2000–2002.

As an event organizer, she has organized many cultural events, film series, concerts and lectures in collaboration with cultural and humanitarian organizations, museums and universities in different countries with the focus of introducing the Persian-Iranian art, cinema and culture to the world and also the strong role of the Iranian Women in Cinema and Art in Iran. In 1998 she organized an Iranian Women Filmmakers trip in the USA. In 2001 in collaboration with the UN she organized the “Dialogue Among Cultures” film series from New York to California in the United States. She was the organizer of “Aneen” all female music band concerts in Paris and Milan in collaboration with UNESCO in 2004. In 2006-2007 she was the co-organizer of the "War in Iranian Cinema Film Series" in the US and UK.

She has received more than 30 national or international film festival awards as a producer and script writer.

== Death ==
Fereshteh Taerpour died from COVID-19 in August 2021.

== Filmography ==
- SAZHAYE NAKOOK, Directed by Ali Hazrati /IRAN 2020
- GOODBYE SHIRAZI GIRL, Directed by Afshin Hashemi /IRAN 2019
- AUNTIE FROG, Directed by Afshin Hashemi /IRAN 2018
- Facing Mirrors, Directed by Negar Azarbayjani /IRAN-GERMANY 2011
- NOKHODI, Directed by Jalal Fatemi / IRAN 2009
- VICE on IRANIAN CINEMA /CANADA, IRAN 2009
- NILOOFAR, Directed by Sabine El Jemayel/ IRAN-FRANCE 2008
- THE OTHER WIFE, Directed by Cyrus Alvand/ IRAN 2007
- WHEN ALL WERE ASLEEP, Directed by Freidoun Hassanpour/ IRAN 2006
- BOB AZIZ, Directed by Naucer Khamir/ IRAN, FRANCE, TUNISIA, ENGLAND, GERMANY 2005
- PERSEPOLIS, a documentary for Arte T.V channel/ German-French, IRAN 2005
- IT'S WINTER, Directed by Rafi Pitts /IRAN 2004
- ONCE UPON A TIME, Directed by Iraj Tahmasb and Hamid Jebelli/ IRAN 2002
- IRAN TODAY, a documentary for KBS / KOREA 2000
- Son of Maryam, Directed by Hamid Jebelli/ IRAN 1999
- BEYOND THE VEIL, a documentary directed by Steven Lawrence and Kim Spencer, IRAN, USA 1998
- BREAD AND POETRY, Directed by Kiumars Pourahmad/ IRAN 1994
- ILIA, THE YOUNG PAINTER, Directed by Abolhasan Davoodi/ IRAN 1993
- THE SHADOWS OF ATTACK, Directed by Ahmad Amini/ IRAN 1993
- OLD MEN'S SCHOOL, Directed by Ali Sajadi/ IRAN 1991
- PATAL AND SMALL WISHES Directed b Masoud Keramati/ IRAN 1990
- THE SILENCE, Directed by Ali Sajadi /IRAN 1990
- GOLNAR, Directed by Kambosia Partovi / IRAN 1989
- THE FISH, Directed by Kambuzia Partovi / IRAN 1988
- TRANS ASIA, By Goetz Balonier / GERMANY
- IRAN, By Hayo Bergman for ZDF, GERMANY
- CHEHREHA, a 26 episode documentary series about famous Iranian Writers, Musicians and Artists
