= Pink certificate =

Military discharge certificate given due to sexual orientation

In Turkey, pink certificate (Turkish: Pembe tezkere) is the colloquial name for a military discharge certificate given to those who are discharged or considered exempt from military service due to their sexual orientation. The Turkish Armed Forces Health Regulation, under Article 17 of "Mental Health and Diseases," explains that the case of "advanced sexual disorders," which are "explicitly apparent in the person's whole life," could cause "objectionable situations in the military environment". To receive such a discharge, individuals must "prove" their homosexuality, under the examination of military doctors and psychologists.

== Background ==
=== Homosexuality in Turkey ===
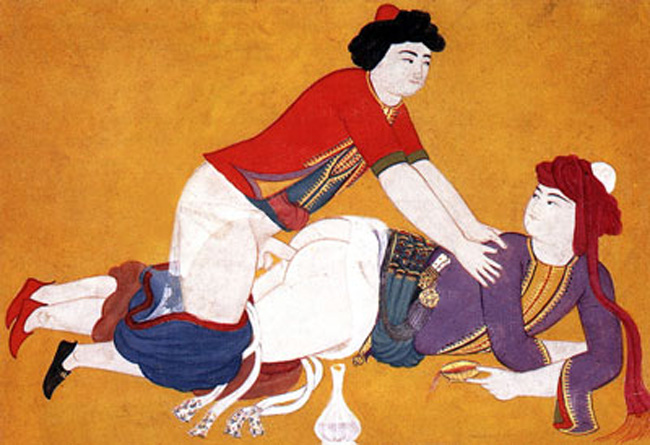
An illustration from the 19th century book Sawaqub al-Manaquib depicting homosexual anal sex with a wine boy. Titled at source as "Spilling the wine"

The first piece of LGBTQ legislation was passed during the Ottoman Caliphate, when homosexuality, köçekler (young dancer slaves) and sodomy were decriminalized in 1858, as part of wider reforms during the Tanzimat. The first Turkish LGBTQ organizations were founded in the early 1990s, Lambda Istanbul, the first of such organizations, was founded in 1993 as a cultural space for the LGBT community, becoming an official organization in 2006. Historically, although homosexuality has not enjoyed a public platform, participation in pride marches, and public acceptance and visibility have risen slowly over the past few years. In spring 2010, Turkey's Minister of State Responsible for Women and Family Affairs, Selma Aliye Kavaf, attracted much media attention when she made a controversial statement during an interview with the daily Hürriyet newspaper: "I believe that homosexuality is a biological disorder, a disease. It is something that needs to get treated." This sparked national as well as international interest in the state of LGBT rights and individuals in Turkey for a brief time as a reaction: LGBT activists organized a march on İstiklal Avenue to call for an apology, homosexuality became a topic of discussion on a public level, and international media outlets criticized the statement, as well as Turkey's stance on homosexuality.

In 2011, Turkey witnessed the biggest pride march to date in Southeast Europe, with participation reaching over 10,000, and with support from parties such as the Republican People's Party (CHP) and the Peace and Democracy Party (BDP). In 2013, the Istanbul Pride march consisted of over 100,000 people, due in large part to the Gezi Park protests taking place at the same time.

=== Regulatory framework ===
Article 17 of the Turkish Armed Forces Health Regulation originally classified homosexuality as a "psychosexual disorder". In 2015 the regulation's wording was revised to refer instead to "sexual identity and behavioural disorders", though homosexuality has continued to serve as grounds for exemption under the amended language.

=== Conscription ===
The Conscription Law that dictates conscription as mandatory was introduced in 1919 at the start of the Turkish War of Independence and has stayed in force since then. Compulsory military service in Turkey applies to all male citizens from twenty to forty years of age, with no legal alternative. There has been significant rise in critical discussions about the topic of mandatory conscription, however most government as well as military officials still oppose the idea of changing Turkey's conscription system. Those who oppose performing military service face three options: they can decide to become a deserter by either leaving the country, or trying to find other ways to escape the grip of the state; they can declare to be a conscientious objector, a decision which is followed by legal persecution in the form of a prison sentence; or they can try to find a way to get (legally) exempted within the framework of health regulations. The Turkish military considers homosexuality a "psychosexual disorder", and thereby worthy of discharge.

Upon completion of their military service, Turks receive a certificate of completion; a certificate of discharge (colloquially referred to as the "pink certificate" or "rotten certificate") if they reveal their homosexual identity any time during the service, in accordance with the health regulation frameworks, or engage in homosexual acts.

== Conditions for acquiring the "Pink Certificate" ==
=== Military Health Regulations ===
The Military Health Regulation for the Turkish Armed Forces looks to the 1968 American Psychiatrists Association's definition of homosexuality as a disease in the Diagnostic and Statistical Manual released that year. As such, homosexuals who are discharged or exempt from military service receive the same report as those who have mental or physical disabilities, and are considered to have a psychosexual disorder. In order to receive this report, individuals have to "prove their homosexuality," undergoing what the Human Rights Watch calls "humiliating and degrading" examinations and tests.

In October 2009, the report of the EU Commission on Enlargement stated that "the Turkish Armed Forces have a health regulation which defines homosexuality as a 'psychosexual' illness and identifies homosexuals as unfit for military service. Conscripts who declare their homosexuality have to provide photographic proof (a photograph of the person on the receiving end of anal intercourse). A small number have had to undergo humiliating medical examinations." These steps are taken, according to the military, to make sure that the system is not being exploited by deserters in order to skip mandatory military service, which has been a historical problem.

Interview with a Homosexual Draftee

"With the picture it was a bit difficult. The face had to be recognizable as well as the penis and the ass. To put all this into a square was a bit complicated. Twice I got cramps because of the position. […] I also got humiliated at the selection, before they announce it [the final diagnosis]. There are about 12 military people, big ones, with uniforms and everything. […] They all looked one by one at the pictures and I had to bring ten pictures, ten different positions there. This is the difficulty of course, but I managed to do it. And at every single picture they looked and compared it with me. I was standing in the middle. And then they asked me questions. For example which positions I like and if I use this position they see regularly. Questions like that."

— Irlenkauser, Julian. "Gender Identities and the Turkish Military." Thesis. European University Viadrina / Istanbul Bilgi University, 2012.

=== Acquiring the "Pembe Tezkere" ===
==== Changes to the exemption process since 2015 ====
Until 2015 conscripts seeking exemption on grounds of homosexuality were commonly required to undergo rectal examination and to submit explicit photographic or video evidence of sexual acts to a military medical board. Reporting from late 2015 indicates the military quietly amended its practice so that a conscript's own declaration, together with observed behaviour, became sufficient grounds for exemption, without a requirement for physical examination or photographic proof. The CPIN's 2023 correspondence with the UK Foreign, commonwealth & Development Office States that, following Turkey's 2016 coup attempt and the constitutional abolition of the military court system the following year, the exemption assessment is now typically conducted at government hospitals rather than military ones, although the process is still initiated by referral to a military hospital psychiatric board. Despite the removal of physical examinations, multiple sources describe the process as still relying heavily on subjective, stereotyped assessments of the applicant's "effeminacy" - dress, mannerisms, and self-presentation, rather than on sexual orientation as such.

== Current procedure ==
Based on correspondence collated in the 2025 CPIN, the process now generally proceeds as follows: a conscript is referred by a civilian doctor to a psychiatrist, who in turn refers him to the nearest military hospital; an initial session is held with a psychiatrist, followed by a second session before a committee of a psychologist, psychiatrist and psychiatric nurse. If the committee finds the applicant to be gay, bisexual or trans, it issues an "unfit for military service" report, which is forward to a Military Council for approval or refusal. An applicant refused an exemption may appeal through a lawyer within 30 days, triggering re-examination at a different military hospital; a further refusal can be appealed to the Ministry of National Defence's Health Department and ultimately to the Ministry Supreme Administrative Court. Family testimony can still form part of the evidentiary basis in some cases, with a relative or friend asked to confirm the applicant's sexual orientation, and applicants sometimes asked to demonstrate involvement in LGBTI organisations or attendance at Pride events.

== Criticisms ==
Excluding homosexuals from the military has been widely regarded as a controversial topic, with its negative effects not only confined to the context of military service. The process by which homosexuals are excluded from the military has received criticism from international and national actors for a multitude of reasons and has been called a "Human Rights Crisis" by the Human Rights Watch. The process correlates sexual orientation with arbitrary factors, such as "feminine" qualities or "promiscuity," and propagates false narratives, homophobia and violence, inside and outside of the military. The involvement of family members means homosexuals are forced to come out, the pressure of which might deter the option to acquire the pink certificate, and continue military service hiding their identity. This leads increased homophobia, blackmail and violence towards homosexuals or effeminate men, since homosexuals in the army have no place to report such violent discrimination, and no protection from it. The insistence on family is a tactic that exploits feelings of shame, forcing the family to be interrogated about their child's sexual identity, often accompanied by inappropriate questions.

Talking about homosexuality in the military is also a taboo, and challenging the status quo can be met with legal challenges, as it is considered illegal to insult the Turkish army. Furthermore, mandatory military service holds a very honorable place in Turkish culture, and not participating in this rite of passage carries a huge social stigma. The stigma stays with the individual for a lifetime, severely damaging the possibility of being hired, as employers typically request proof that the employee has done their military service. In addition, employers can discern the sexuality of potential employees from their discharge papers (differentiating between those discharged for physical or mental disabilities, and for homosexuality), further reducing chances of employment, and resulting in the employee being fired if such behaviours are discovered.

Human rights organisations and the European Commission have continued to raise concerns notwithstanding the procedural changes: The European Commission's Turkey 2020 Report noted that no changes had been made to the military disciplinary system or to the medical regulations defining homosexuality as a disorder, and the exemption report itself does not state a reason for a conscript's unfitness, which employers may interpret as evidence of the holder's sexual orientation when it is produced during hiring.

== See also ==
- LGBT history in Turkey
- LGBT rights in Turkey
- Homosexuality test (disambiguation)
- Sexual orientation and military service
