= The Offering (2023 film) =

2023 American film by Oliver Park

- Official release poster
- Directed by: Oliver Park
- Screenplay by: Hank Hoffman
- Story by: Hank Hoffman; Jonathan Yunger
- Produced by: Jeff Greenstein; Les Weldon; Jonathan Yunger; Yariv Lerner; Hank Hoffman; Sam Schulte
- Starring: Nick Blood; Emm Wiseman; Allan Corduner; Paul Kaye; Daniel Ben Zenou; Jodie Jacobs
- Cinematography: Lorenzo Senatore
- Music by: Christopher Young
- Production companies: Millennium Media; Nu Boyana Film Studios
- Distributed by: Decal
- Release date: January 13, 2023
- Running time: 93 minutes
- Country: United States
- Language: English

The Offering is a 2023 American horror-thriller film directed by Oliver Park and with a screenplay by Hank Hoffman from a story by Hoffman and Jonathan Yunger, based on the Jewish folktale of Abyzou. It stars Nick Blood, Emily Wiseman, Allan Corduner, Paul Kaye, Daniel Ben Zenou and Jodie Jacobs.

== Plot ==
An old man conducts a ritual by slaughtering a chicken and hurriedly spreading ash in a circle. His sickly wife appears at the door and tells him to stop, to which he replies "Burn in hell". He starts reading from a book and the letters start to bleed. Then a little girl whispers his name, Yosille, and asks him if he wants to see his wife again, to which he replies negatively. He steps outside the circle, swallowing a dark smoke as his sclera turns black. He then stabs himself with a knife from his back pocket. The demon tries to remove the amulet around his neck to no avail.

Arthur (Art) and his pregnant wife come to Brooklyn to visit his father, who runs a Jewish funeral house in a Hasidic community. He and his father, Saul, became estranged after he married Claire, a non-Jewish British food journalist. Saul is welcoming to Art and Claire, wanting to establish a relationship with both of them. Art has an alternative agenda for the visit. He needs his father to mortgage his house to help his failing real estate business.

Art volunteers to help his father with a new suicide body that has come in. The funeral home is the basement of their home. Art has a run in with Heimish, who works with his father. Heimish cares for Saul and is suspicious of Art's visit. As Saul and Heimish speak, Arthur prepares the body of Yosille. While preparing the body, the amulet around Yosille's neck falls through a drain, releasing the demon which immediately begins to haunt Claire.

Saul comes across the knife that Yosille used to commit suicide and becomes suspicious. He calls Reb Chayim and asks about the inscription. Reb Chayim tells Saul that this, in conjunction with an amulet is used for a binding spell. But as there was no amulet found, Chayim dismisses its importance.

Meanwhile, Art and Heimish go to pick up another body. It is the body of Sarah Scheindel, a missing girl from the community. Heimish picks up Art's phone and discovers Art's money problems and his intention to ask his father to mortgage his house. Heimish exposes Art in front of Saul and Claire. When Claire confronts Art, he opens up to her about his loss of faith after the death of his mother.

That night, while Saul is in the mortuary, the demon attacks and kills him. Art wakes up the next day to see men praying around his father's body. Heimish blames Art saying he died of a broken heart and gives him the paper that Art needed Saul to sign.

During the funeral both Art and Claire have disturbing visions. Claire has visions of Sarah Schneidel. Art sleepwalks and draws a sigil. He wakes up on a carpet and thinks he was dreaming.

Art struggles to wrap up his father's business as Heimish has quit. He is told that Yosille needs a police clearance before he can be buried or a next-of-kin must sign off on it, even though it was a clear suicide.

He goes to Yosille's house where he finds a video tape. He discovers Yosille was attempting to conjure the archangel of life, Martiel, so that he could bring back his dead wife Aida. He used Sarah for the ritual. But the ritual killed Sarah and conjured the demon Abyzou instead.

Meanwhile, “Aida” comes to visit Claire and tells her she wants to see her husband's body. When Claire tells her husband Aida is here to see Yosille's body, Art realizes his wife is in danger. While Claire is on the phone, “Aida” burns Yosille's body, which releases the Abyzou. Art tries to rescue his wife, but is unable to.

Art turns to Heimish and shows him Yosille's video. Heimish brings in Chayim for help. They discover the sigil and Chayim says that the demon gains strength and is fed when a child is inside it. Chayim explains the binding ritual and explains that Abyzou has to be trapped in a body. Art is willing to sacrifice himself for his wife and child.

Abyzou kills Chayim, so Art and Heimish rush to begin the ritual. Heimish tells Art not to step outside the circle, but Heimish is taken by the demon. Art begins the ritual, but he sees his wife who is taken and threatened by the demon. He leaves the circle to rescue his wife who is being held against a high window.

Unable to do anything else, Art finishes the inscription to force the demon inside him, but he is unable to kill himself. Heimish crawls to him and Art begs Heimish to stab him with the inscribed knife. Heimish reluctantly stabs Art, then tells him that he should have stayed in the circle. Heimish alludes to the amulet that has been taken off and flung across the room. Art then sees the real Heimish's dead body in the next room, and dies helplessly.

Claire wakes up under a table. She rushes to the demon masquerading as Art, but looks down to see she is standing in the sigil. The demon, in Art's form, asks her if the baby is okay, and as soon as she answers positively, Abyzou appears and takes her.

== Cast ==
- Nick Blood as Arthur
- Emily Wiseman as Claire
- Allan Corduner as Saul
- Paul Kaye as Heimish
- Daniel Ben Zenou as Reb Chayim
- Jodie Jacobs as Chana
- Sofia Weldon as Sarah Scheindal
- Anton Trendafilov as Yosille
- Velizar Binev as Moishe
- Meglena Karalambova as Aida
- Jonathan Yunger as Levi Siegelman

== Production ==
In June 2020, Oliver Park was reported to be directing the film in his feature directorial debut. Under the working title Abyzou, filming began on January 25, 2021, at Nu Boyana Film Studios, in the midst the COVID-19 pandemic in Bulgaria. Safety measures the production crew followed included mask wearing and regular COVID tests and temperature checks.

In February 2024, Millennium Media president Jonathan Yunger stated that, after a practical special effect for a film's demon character proved disappointing, he used generative AI to make numerous replacement creature designs, which were passed on to visual effects. This was initially reported as a production detail for Hellboy: The Crooked Man, but in May 2024 that film's director Brian Taylor said that Yunger had been referring to The Offering.

== Release ==
The film was released by Decal on January 13, 2023.

=== Critical reception ===
On the review aggregator website Rotten Tomatoes, the film holds an approval rating of 76% based on 45 reviews. The site's consensus reads: "Within the outline of its fairly standard story, The Offering puts a unique--and often genuinely scary--spin on demonic possession horror tropes". On Metacritic, the film has a weighted average score of 60 out of 100, based on 7 critics, indicating "mixed or average reviews".

In a review for Variety, Dennis Harvey described The Offering as "a lively but cluttered pileup of jump scares with too few original ideas". Comparing it to 2019's The Vigil, Harvey referred to the film as the "showier affair of the two" and points out that it lacks The Vigil's "atmospheric dread and psychological plausibility, resulting in a jump-scare-riddled contraption ultimately more cheesy than frightening." He praised the production design and camerawork, and stated that most of the actors "do decent work". He criticized The Offering's "short-attention-spanned, obvious overall approach, which sacrifices credibility for increasingly cluttered, ineffectual shocks" and concludes his review by stating that The Offering is at no risk of being boring, but is "just too much".

Brian Tallerico of RogerEbert.com gave the film 2.5 out of 4 stars, referring to it as a "surprisingly strong genre alternative". He noted that the "performances are a mixed bag", with the older actors seeming to "understand the assignment" better than their younger counterparts. Tallerico also criticized the brightness level on certain scenes, describing the film as "often too well-lit".

Christian Zilko of IndieWire gave the film a grade of A− and praised its craftsmanship and production design. He wrote: "There's no shortage of great movies about exorcising demons from people's bodies, but this might be the best film about trying to keep one in". Marco Vito Oddo of Collider gave the film a B, stating that "The Offering won’t get any points for originality, but people looking for well-crafted horror can’t go wrong with Park’s latest film". He pointed out that The Offering was "too reliant on jumpscares" but went on to praise Allan Corduner and Paul Kaye's performances and noted that despite its lack of originality, it still delivered "good-old fashion horror fun".
