= And Then Came Love =

- Directed by: Richard Schenkman
- Written by: Caytha Jentis
- Produced by: Caytha Jentis; Verne Mattson; Anthony J. Vorhies
- Starring: Vanessa Williams; Eartha Kitt; Kevin Daniels; Michael Boatman; Stephen Spinella; Ben Vereen; Eileen Alana
- Cinematography: Timothy Naylor
- Edited by: Richard LaBrie
- Music by: Rebecca Lloyd
- Distributed by: Warner Premiere
- Release date: June 1, 2007 (limited)
- Running time: 90 minutes
- Country: United States
- Language: English

And Then Came Love is a 2007 American romantic comedy film directed by Richard Schenkman. It premiered at the Urban Film Series Festival in Washington, D.C. in June 2007, with a limited theatrical release in Ridgewood, New Jersey beginning in that same month along with a premiere in Manhattan, New York.

The film stars Vanessa Williams, Eartha Kitt (in her final film role), Kevin Daniels, Michael Boatman, Stephen Spinella, and Ben Vereen.

== Plot ==
Julie (Vanessa Williams), a successful Manhattan reporter-turned-columnist in her mid-40s believes she has it all - a great job, a rent-controlled apartment, a boyfriend (Michael Boatman), and best of all, an adorable six-year-old son named Jake, whom she conceived via an anonymous sperm donor. Her perfect world, however, is rocked when she’s called in for an emergency parent-teacher conference and learns that her son has been acting up, needs to be ‘tested,’ and is on the brink of expulsion.

Overwhelmed, Julie instinctively blames herself easily since her mother (Eartha Kitt) has made her feel inadequate for not being a stay-at-home mom. Julie, however, will not concede that her mother could be right, so she places genetic blame on Jake’s anonymous father. Through a private investigator, Julie learns the identity of the donor and meets him – Paul (Kevin Daniels), a struggling actor and law school dropout.

Julie has neither intention nor desire to reveal her identity to him; she needs to check her sources, get the facts, and move on. Jake instantly bonds with Paul, however, and no matter how hard Julie tries to keep Paul from complicating her life, the more he begins to fall for her, and she finds she too is falling badly for him even while her boyfriend is pushing to set a wedding date.

== Cast ==
- Vanessa Williams as Julie
- Kevin Daniels as Paul
- Michael Boatman as Ted
- Jeremy Gumbs as Jake
- Eartha Kitt as Mona
- Tommy Nelson as Horatio
- Stephen Spinella as Stuart
- Eileen Alana as Miss Missy

Rest of the cast listed alphabetically:

- Collin Biddle as Maitre' D (credited as Colin Biddle)
- Anna Camp as Kikki
- Courtney Carter as Park Nanny
- Mike Colter as Yuppie Paul
- Peter Conboy as Man on Street
- Andrea Darriau as Jittery Woman
