= Offside (2006 Iranian film) =

- Film poster
- Directed by: Jafar Panahi
- Written by: Jafar Panahi; Shadmehr Rastin
- Starring: Shima Mobarak-Shahi; Safar Samandar; Shayesteh Irani; Ayda Sadeqi; Golnaz Farmani; Mohsen Tanabandeh
- Cinematography: Rami Agami; Mahmoud Kalari
- Edited by: Jafar Panahi
- Music by: Yuval Barazani; Korosh Bozorgpour
- Distributed by: Sony Pictures Classics
- Release date: 17 February 2006
- Running time: 93 minutes
- Country: Iran
- Language: Persian
- Box office: $857,282

Offside (Persian: آفساید) is a 2006 Iranian political comedy-drama film directed by Jafar Panahi. The film is about a group of girls who try to watch a World Cup qualifying match but are forbidden by law because of their gender. Female fans are not allowed to enter football stadiums in Iran on the grounds that there will be a high risk of violence or verbal abuse against them. The film was inspired by the director's daughter, who decided to attend a game anyway. The film was shot in Iran but its screening is banned there.

== Plot ==
Most of the characters in the film are not named.

A girl disguises herself as a boy to go attend the 2006 World Cup qualifying match between Iran and Bahrain. She travels by bus with a group of male fans, some of whom notice her gender, but do not tell anyone. Upon arrival at the grounds of Azadi Stadium, she persuades a reluctant ticket tout to sell her a ticket; he only agrees to do so at an inflated price. The girl tries to slip through security, but she is spotted and arrested. She is put in a holding pen on the stadium roof with several other women who have also been caught; the pen is frustratingly close to a window onto the match, but the women are at the wrong angle to see it.

The women are guarded by several soldiers, all of whom are just doing their national service; one in particular is an Iranian Azeri boy from Tabriz who just wants to return to his farm. The soldiers are bored and do not particularly care whether women should be allowed to attend football matches; however, they guard the women carefully out of fear for their "chief", who could come by at any moment. They occasionally give commentary on the match to the women as they themselves watch the match through the bars of a gate.

One of the younger girls needs to go to the toilet, but there is no women's toilet in the stadium. A soldier is deputed to escort her to the men's toilet, which he does by an increasingly farcical process: first disguising her face with a poster of a football star, then throwing a number of angry men out of the toilet and blockading any more from entering. During the chaos, the girl escapes into the stadium, although she returns to the holding pen shortly after as she is worried about the soldier from Tabriz getting into trouble. Shortly after she returns, Iran scores against Bahrain prompting dancing and cheering amongst the girls. Even the soldiers are too busy celebrating to care about the rowdiness, until the "chief" shows up part of the way through the second half of the game.

The women are then bundled into a bus, along with a boy arrested for carrying fireworks, and the soldiers ordered to drive them to the Vice Squad headquarters. As the bus travels through Tehran, the soldier from Tabriz plays the radio commentary on the match as it concludes. Iran defeats Bahrain 1–0 with a goal from Mohammad Nosrati just after half time and wild celebrations erupt within the bus as the women and the soldiers cheer and sing with joy. The girl whose story began the film is the only one not happy. When asked why, she explains that she is not really interested in football; she wanted to attend the match because a friend of hers was one of seven people killed in a scuffle during the recent Iran–Japan match, and she wanted to see the match in his memory.

The city of Tehran explodes with festivity, and the bus becomes caught in a traffic jam as a spontaneous street party begins. Borrowing seven sparklers from the boy with the fireworks, the women and the soldiers leave the bus and join the party, holding the sparklers above them.

The film was filmed at an actual stadium during a qualifying match for the Iranian National team. Panahi had two separate outcomes to the film depending on the turnout of the match.

== Cast ==
- Sima Mobarak-Shahi as first girl
- Shayesteh Irani as smoking girl
- Ayda Sadeqi as football player girl
- Golnaz Farmani as girl with chador
- Mahnaz Zabihi as soldier girl
- Nazanin Sediqzadeh as young girl
- Mohammed Kheyrabadi as Mashadi soldier
- Masad Kheymeh Kabood as Tehrani soldier
- Hadi Saeedi as soldier
- Mohsen Tanabandeh as the ticket seller

== Production ==
Offside was filmed over 38 days and has a runtime similar to that of an actual football match, at just over 90 minutes. In order to get approval for filming in time for the Iran-Bahrain qualifying game, Panahi submitted a fake script under his assistant's name to the Ministry of Guidance. Several scenes in Offside were filmed at the actual Iran-Bahrain qualifying match, meaning that the script was often edited in real time to match events unfolding at the game.

=== Inspiration ===
Panahi originally came up with the idea for the film after a football game several years before 2006, where his own daughter snuck into the stadium in defiance of Iranian law.

== Reception ==
=== Box office ===
For the film's opening, it was screened in five theaters and grossed $18,003.

Worldwide, the filmed grossed a total of $437,055, with the majority coming from international revenue.

=== Critical response ===
The film received very positive reviews from critics. Offside has an approval rating of 94% on review aggregator website Rotten Tomatoes, based on 85 reviews, and an average rating of 8/10. The website's critical consensus states: "A spirited film that explores gender politics with comedy, intelligence, and a variety of interesting characters". Metacritic assigned the film a weighted average score of 85 out of 100, based on 25 critics, indicating "universal acclaim".

=== Top ten lists ===
The film appeared on several critics' top ten lists of the best films of 2007.

- First – Ed Gonzalez, Slant Magazine
- 3rd – Noel Murray, The A.V. Club
- 6th – J. Hoberman, The Village Voice
- 9th – Peter Rainer, The Christian Science Monitor
- 9th -Emanuel Levy, EmanuelLevy.com Cinema 24/7
- 9th – Tasha Robinson, The A.V. Club
- 9th – Rosa Escandon, Forbes

In July 2025, it ranked number 92 on Rolling Stone's list of "The 100 Best Movies of the 21st Century".

=== Screening controversies ===
Offside is still banned from public screening in Iran. After its release in 2006, Sony Pictures Classics attempted to persuade Iran's Ministry of Culture and Islamic Guidance to lift the ban for a short period in order to let the film qualify for an Oscar campaign. However, the ministry refused.

=== Awards ===
The film won the Silver Bear at the Berlin International Film Festival in 2006, and was in the official selection for the 2006 New York and Toronto International Film Festivals. At the Asian Film Awards, Jafar Panahi was nominated for Best Director for the film.

== See also ==
- List of association football films
