= Buffering (film) =

- Directed by: Darren Flaxstone; Christian Martin
- Written by: Darren Flaxstone; Christian Martin
- Produced by: Chris Broughton; Bernie Hodges; Christian Martin
- Starring: Alex Anthony; Conner Mckenzy; Jessica Matthews; Oliver Park
- Cinematography: Jack O'Dowd
- Edited by: Darren Flaxstone
- Distributed by: TLA Releasing
- Release dates: 14 January 2011 (Festival del Sol, Gran Canaria); 24 April 2011 (U.S.)
- Running time: 80 minutes
- Country: United Kingdom
- Language: English
- Budget: $30,000

Buffering is a 2011 British comedy film written and directed by Darren Flaxstone and Christian Martin and starring Alex Anthony, Conner Mckenzy, Jessica Matthews and Oliver Park and released by TLA Releasing.

== Plot ==
Seb and Aaron have overspent and built up debts on their credit card. Aaron decides to take matters into his own hands and secretly films their sex life to broadcast online. The money pours in until he gets caught! Realising that the scheme could sort out their financial problems, Seb agrees to allow things to continue until they are back in the black. When their friend Jem arrives and suggests a third party might help them make even more cash, things start to get a little tricky.

== Cast ==
- Alex Anthony as Seb
- Conner Mckenzy as Aaron
- Jessica Matthews as Jem
- Oliver Park as Mitch
- Bernie Hodges as the Shop Keeper
- Tony Banham as Randy
- Richard Chan as Kung Fu Guy
- Ryan Spong as Vampire Boy

== Production ==
The directing and screenwriting team of Darren Flaxstone and Christian Martin completed this film on a modest scale, with a budget of $30,000 and filming over a period of twelve days.
