= Facing Mirrors =

2011 film by Negar Azarbayjani

- Directed by: Negar Azarbayjani
- Written by: Negar Azarbayjani; Fereshteh Taerpoor
- Produced by: Fereshteh Taerpoor
- Starring: Homayoun Ershadi
- Cinematography: Turaj Mansuri
- Distributed by: Box Entertainment
- Release dates: September 2011 (TIFF); 24 October 2012 (Iran)
- Running time: 102 minutes
- Country: Iran
- Language: Persian

Facing Mirrors (Persian: آینه‌های روبرو, romanized: Aynehaye Rooberoo) is a 2011 Iranian drama film directed and co-written by Negar Azarbayjani. The film is produced and co-written by Fereshteh Taerpoor.

== Plot ==
Rana and Adineh (Eddie), two people of different backgrounds and social class are brought together to share a cab ride. Rana, inexperienced, religious and bound by traditions, is forced to drive a cab in order to survive financially and support her family. Adineh, wealthy yet rebellious, has escaped from their home and an upcoming arranged marriage. Together they share a cab ride.

During the journey Rana finds out that Adineh is transgender and planning to undergo surgery. While this discovery conflicts with Rana's traditional values, both of them become friends as they navigate through the struggle to attain independance.

== Cast ==
- Homayoun Ershadi as Pedar
- Shayesteh Irani as Adineh (Eddie)
- Nima Shahrokh Shahi as Brother
- Ghazal Shakeri as Rana
- Saber Abar as Sadegh (Saber Abbar)

== Awards and nominations ==
At the Asia Pacific Screen Awards, Shayesteh Irani was nominated for Best Performance. The film was nominated to win Scythian Deer for Grand Prix and has been awarded the Special Mention Prize of the Ecumenical Jury for Feature Film at the Molodist International Film Festival.

At San Francisco's Frameline Film Festival in 2012, Facing Mirrors received "Best First Feature" award for Negar Azarbayjani's first feature. In the eighteenth edition of the LGBT film festival held in Paris, Negar Azarbayjani won the Grand Prix prize at Chéries-Chéris 2012. The film won against nine other competitors in the official selection.

== See also ==
- List of lesbian, gay, bisexual or transgender-related films of 2011
- List of LGBT-related films directed by women
- Transgender rights in Iran
