= Bad Parents =

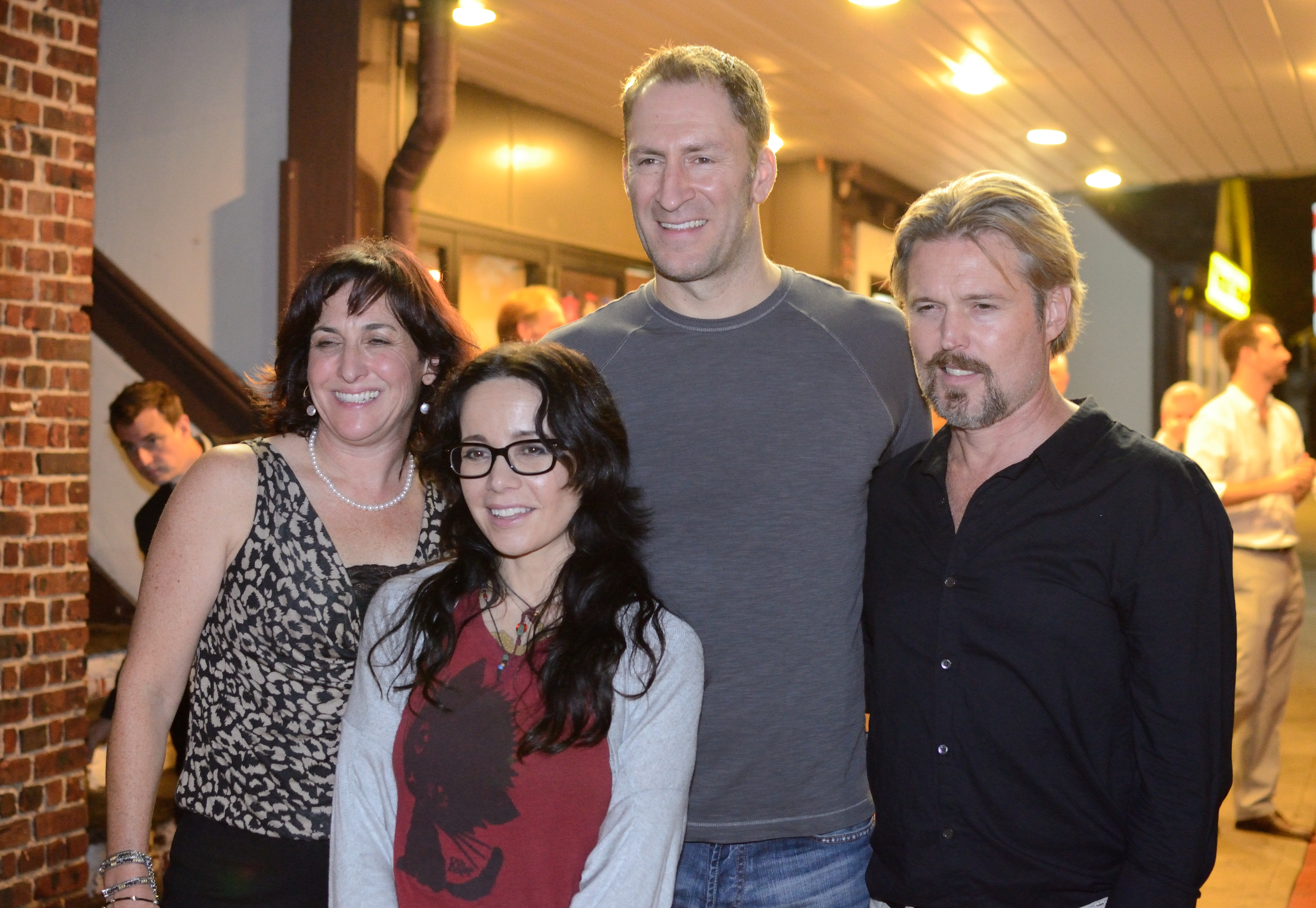
- Publicity photo
- Directed by: Caytha Jentis
- Written by: Caytha Jentis
- Based on: It's All About the Kids by Caytha Jentis
- Produced by: Dorothy Fucito; Caytha Jentis
- Starring: Janeane Garofalo; Christopher Titus; Michael Boatman; Reiko Aylesworth; Cheri Oteri; Kristen Johnston; Rebecca Budig
- Cinematography: Anthony Savini
- Edited by: Verne Mattson
- Music by: James Harrell
- Production company: Bad Parents
- Distributed by: Gaiam Vivendi Entertainment
- Release date: October 3, 2012 (MFF)
- Running time: 100 minutes
- Country: United States
- Language: English

Bad Parents is a 2012 comedy film written and directed by Caytha Jentis and starring Janeane Garofalo. The movie humorously showcases New Jersey soccer moms becoming obsessed with their children's role in the sport. The supporting cast features Christopher Titus and Cheri Oteri.

== Cast ==
- Janeane Garofalo as Kathy
- Christopher Titus as Nick
- Michael Boatman as Gary
- Reiko Aylesworth as Laurie
- Cheri Oteri as Melissa
- Kristen Johnston as Tracy
- Rebecca Budig as Allison
- Bill Sage as Dan
- Lauren Francesca as Candy
- Hannah Thompson as Olivia

== Production ==
The film was shot entirely in New Jersey and used local Morris County talent. Jentis based the film on her own experiences.

== Release ==
Bad Parents premiered on October 3, 2012, at the Montclair Film Festival and later played at Ridgewood, New Jersey, on February 23, 2014.
