= Michael Boatman =

American actor and writer (born 1964)

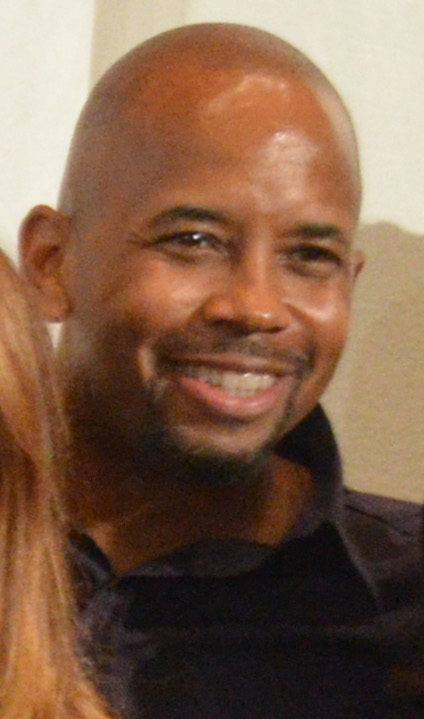
- Boatman in 2013
- Born: Michael Patrick Boatman; October 25, 1964 (age 61); Colorado Springs, Colorado, U.S.
- Education: Western Illinois University
- Occupations: Actor, writer
- Years active: 1987–present
- Children: 4

Michael Patrick Boatman (born October 25, 1964) is an American actor and writer. He is known for his roles as New York City mayoral aide Carter Heywood in the ABC sitcom Spin City, as U.S. Army Specialist Samuel Beckett in the ABC drama series China Beach, as 101st Airborne soldier Motown in the Vietnam War movie Hamburger Hill, and as sports agent Stanley Babson in the HBO sitcom Arli$$. He also starred in The Good Fight, the Paramount+ spin-off of The Good Wife.

== Early life and education ==
Boatman was born in Colorado Springs, Colorado, the son of Gwendolyn Boatman Pugh, a job supervisor for the disabled, and Daniel Boatman, an army officer. He was raised in Chicago. Boatman is a graduate of Western Illinois University and received its "Alumni Achievement Award" in 1997.

Boatman studied acting at Western Illinois University, where he played a variety of roles including Oberon in A Midsummer Night's Dream, and Purlie in Purlie Victorious. He was a member of the student sketch comedy troupe Shock Treatment, which performed at local bars and nightclubs. During his senior year, Boatman won the prestigious Irene Ryan theater award for best supporting actor during the finals competition at the Kennedy Center.

== Acting career ==
In 1986, Boatman moved to Chicago, where he studied acting with Jane Brody, a popular acting teacher and casting director. Later that same year, he auditioned for and won the role of "Motown" in the critically acclaimed Vietnam action drama, Hamburger Hill. That same year, he appeared in Running on Empty with River Phoenix, and The Trial of Bernard Goetz for the PBS American Playhouse series. In 1988, he auditioned for the pilot episode of the Vietnam era television drama, China Beach. He went on to play Samuel Beckett, the mortician in the China Beach mortuary, for the next three seasons. He later co-starred on The Jackie Thomas Show with Tom Arnold, and the short-lived WB series Muscle. In 1996, he landed a role on the ABC sitcom, Spin City, playing Carter Heywood, the irascible, openly gay minority affairs liaison. For his work on Spin City, he was nominated for five NAACP Image Awards for Best Supporting Actor in a Comedy. He also won the GLAAD (Gay and Lesbian Association Against Defamation) award for Best Actor.

At the same time, he was on Spin City, Boatman played the role of Stanley Babson, the anal-retentive chief financial officer on the HBO original series Arliss and starred on both series simultaneously until they were canceled in 2002. For his work on Arliss Boatman was nominated for four Image Awards, also for Best Supporting Actor. He played the lead role in the critically acclaimed Charles Burnett drama, The Glass Shield. Later, he appeared in the feature films The Peacemaker, with George Clooney and Nicole Kidman, and Woman Thou Art Loosed, and in several made-for-TV movies. Michael Boatman also narrated in the WPA slave narratives in the HBO film Unchained Memories, in 2003.

In 2007, Boatman co-starred in the feature films, The Killing of Wendy (2008), American Summer and My Father's Will. He has had many notable guest appearances, including five episodes of Law & Order: Special Victims Unit, Less than Perfect, Yes, Dear, Scrubs, CSI: Miami, Hannah Montana and Grey's Anatomy. Boatman guest starred in the mystery/drama Warehouse 13, in July 2009.

In 2009, he joined the cast of the Lifetime comedy series Sherri, starring Sherri Shepherd. The series is based on Shepherd's life experiences as a divorced single mom, actress and stand-up comedian. Boatman plays Doctor Randy Gregg, Sherri's son's pediatrician and Sherri's love interest.

More recently he has appeared as attorney Julius Cain in The Good Wife. In 2011, Boatman guest starred as Russell Thorpe on Gossip Girl, along with Tika Sumpter, who played his daughter Raina. In 2012, Boatman became a recurring character in the FX original series Anger Management, reuniting with his former Spin City co-star Charlie Sheen as Sheen's next door neighbor Michael. Beginning in late September 2013, he began co-starring in Nick at Nite's series Instant Mom, alongside Tia Mowry-Hardrict. In 2016, Boatman recurred on the CBS All Access drama The Good Fight, reprising the role of attorney Julius Cain, the character he played on The Good Wife. He was promoted to series regular in the second season. He became a recurring character in season 3 of Madam Secretary as FBI Director Keith Doherty. In 2017, he was a recurring character on season 2 of The Other F Word playing David Michaelson. He also recently starred in The Shade and will star in the upcoming film The Cutting Room.

== Writing ==
Boatman is also an author. He sometimes writes in the splatterpunk horror genre. Joe R. Lansdale praised his first collection with "Michael Boatman writes like a visitor from hell. Someone out on short term leave for bad behavior. I love this stuff. He's one of the new, and more than promising, writers making his mark, and a dark and wonderful mark it is."

Many multi-author anthologies feature at least one of his short stories. They include Sick Things: An Anthology of Extreme Creature Horror, Until Someone Loses an Eye, Sages and Swords, Badass Horror and Christmas in Hell and Dominion: An Anthology of Speculative Fiction From Africa and the African Diaspora. He has been published in Weird Tales, Horror Garage and Red Scream. He introduced Cyber-Pulp Halloween 3.0 which was published by Cyber-pulp Books. His Born Again from Eulogies II: Tales From the Cella received an Honorable Mention from Ellen Datlow in The Best Horror of the Year: Volume Six. His first collection of short stories, God Laughs When You Die was published by Dybbuk Press on October 23, 2007. His humorous horror novel, The Revenant Road, was published by Drollerie Press in 2009. His comic fantasy novel, Last God Standing was published in 2014. Angry Robot Books, and its companion novel, Who Wants to be the Prince of Darkness?, was published in 2016.

== Filmography ==
=== Film ===
Year	Title	Role	Notes
1987	Hamburger Hill	Specialist Ray Motown	
1988	Running on Empty	Spaulding	
1992	Unbecoming Age	Robert	
1994	The Glass Shield	Deputy J.J. Johnson	
1997	The Peacemaker	Lieutenant Beach	
1998	Walking to the Waterline	Marshall the Mover	
2004	Woman Thou Art Loosed	Todd	
2006	Kalamazoo?	Special Angel Albert	
2007	And Then Came Love	Ted	
2008	The Pool Boys	Donovan Tucker	
2009	The Killing of Wendy	Detective Blake	
2009	My Father's Will	Lawrence	
2010	Three Chris's	Walter Wayne	
2010	Philadelphia: The Great Experiment	Narrator	Short
2010	Inside Out	Katherine's Therapist	Short
2011	Queen of Media	Robert	
2012	Bad Parents	Gary	
2017	Anything	Charles	
2017	Like.Share.Follow	Norman	
2018	Second Act	Edward Taylor	

=== Television ===
Year	Title	Role	Notes
1988	American Playhouse	-	Episode: "The Trial of Bernhard Goetz"
1989	Johnny Snipes	Dan Harvie	Supporting cast
1988–91	China Beach	Pvt. Samuel Beckett	Main cast
1990	Donor	Arnold	TV movie
1991	Fourth Story	Sgt. Teal	TV movie
1991	Shades of LA	Dr. Robinson	Episode: "Line of Fire: Part 2"
1992	In the Line of Duty: Street War	Robert Dayton	TV movie
1992	Quantum Leap	Sergeant Billy Johnson	Episode: "Nowhere to Run"
1992–93	The Jackie Thomas Show	Grant Watson	Main cast
1993	House of Secrets	Sgt. Joe DuBois	TV movie
1995	Muscle	Garnet Hines	Main cast
1995	The Larry Sanders Show	Greg	Episode: "I Was a Teenage Lesbian"
1995	Living Single	Brent Washington	Episode: "Let It Snow, Let It Snow, Let It Snow... Dammit"
1996–2002	Spin City	Carter Haywood	Main cast
1996–2002	Arli$$	Stanley Babson	Main cast
2003	Less than Perfect	Ted Elliot	Episode: "The Umbrella" & "Choices"
2003	Law & Order	Defense Attorney Dave Seaver	Episode: "House Calls"
2003–11	Law & Order: Special Victims Unit	Defense Attorney Dave Seaver	Recurring cast: Season 5-7 & 12
2004	CSI: Miami	Wes Gallagher	Episode: "Not Landing"
2004	Yes, Dear	Adam	Episode: "Couples Therapy"
2004	Educating Lewis	Joe	TV movie
2005	Play Dates	Stewart	TV movie
2005	Scrubs	Ron Laver	Episode: "My Roommates"
2005	The Wonderful World of Disney	The Jester	Episode: "Once Upon a Mattress"
2006	Huff	Art	Episode: "Maps Don't Talk"
2007	Traveling in Packs	Bob	TV movie
2007	Frangela	Adam	TV movie
2007	Law & Order	Defense Attorney Dave Seaver	Episode: "Remains of the Day"
2007	Grey's Anatomy	Doug Kendry	Episode: "My Favorite Mistake"
2008	Hannah Montana	Randall Harrison	Episode: "Hannah in the Streets with Diamonds"
2009	Criminal Minds	William Harris	Episode: "Soul Mates"
2009	The Game	Lawrence Chauncey Wright	Recurring cast: Season 3
2009	Warehouse 13	Professor Ed Marzotto	Episode: "Pilot"
2009	Sherri	Dr. Randolph Gregg	Recurring cast
2009–15	The Good Wife	Julius Cain	Recurring cast: Seasons 1–3 & 5, guest: Season 6
2010	White Collar	Russel Smith	Episode: "Copycat Caffrey"
2011	Gossip Girl	Russell Thorpe	Recurring cast: Season 4
2011	The Doctor	Dr. Robert Brody	TV movie
2012	Hornet's Nest	Richard Panessa	TV movie
2012	The Smart One	Tom Holiday	TV movie
2012–14	Anger Management	Michael	Recurring cast
2013–15	Instant Mom	Charlie Phillips	Main cast
2016–17	Madam Secretary	FBI Director Keith Doherty	Recurring cast: Season 3
2017	The Other F Word	David Michaelson	Recurring cast: Season 2
2017–22	The Good Fight	Julius Cain	Recurring cast: Season 1, main cast: Season 2–6
2022	Would I Lie to You?	Himself	Episode: "Criminal Bear"
2022	Law & Order	Defense Attorney Dave Seaver	Episode: "12 Seconds"
