= The One (2011 film) =

2011 American romantic comedy film directed by Caytha Jentis

- DVD cover
- Directed by: Caytha Jentis
- Written by: Caytha Jentis
- Produced by: Caytha Jentis; Michael Billy
- Starring: Jon Prescott; Ian Novick; Margaret Anne Florence
- Cinematography: Benjamin Wolf
- Edited by: Verne Mattson
- Music by: Kenneth Lampl
- Production company: Fox Meadow Films
- Release date: April 8, 2011 (Philadelphia)
- Running time: 90 minutes
- Country: United States
- Language: English

The One is a 2011 American romantic comedy film produced, written and directed by Caytha Jentis, in her directorial debut. It stars Jon Prescott, Ian Novick and Margaret Anne Florence. The film premiered at the Philadelphia CineFest on April 8, 2011, and was also screened at the Frameline Film Festival in June 2011, and at the Philadelphia QFest, in July 2011. It had a limited theatrical release on October 7, 2011. Fox Meadow Films, owned by Jentis, produced the feature film. Jentis said she wrote the screenplay "after spending several nights with friends discussing true love", and it was the fastest script she had ever written.

== Plot ==
Daniel and Tommy met in college and played lacrosse together, and Tommy has been crushing on Daniel ever since. The film opens with Tommy, who has since come out, and Daniel unexpectedly meeting one another in a bar and reminiscing over their college years. They end up sleeping together after leaving the bar, and the next morning, Daniel announces he is engaged to Jen. Even though he has feelings for Tommy, he is determined to bury those urges and go ahead with the wedding. Later, when Tommy runs into Daniel and Jen at the gym, Daniel reluctantly introduces Tommy to Jen, and they hit it off. Tommy then schemes to get Daniel alone by inviting him to a reunion of college alumni, but when he arrives, Daniel discovers it was a ruse, and instead, it is an intimate country getaway with just the two of them. The pair are falling deeper in love, but Daniel also loves Jen, so he has to make a choice and decide who will be 'the one'.

== Cast ==
- Jon Prescott as Daniel
- Ian Novick as Tommy
- Margaret Anne Florence as Jen
- David Albiero as Toby
- Collin Biddle as Dr. Wilson
- Michael Billy as Stephen

== Release ==
The film premiered at the Philadelphia CineFest on April 8, 2011, and then was screened at the San Francisco International LGBT Film Festival on June 25, 2011. It then moved on to the Philadelphia QFest on July 10, 2011, and had a limited theatrical release on October 7, 2011. It was released on DVD and VOD on October 18, 2011, and then started airing on streaming services on November 28, 2016.

== Critical reception ==
The Gay City News said in their review the film is likeable, despite "being a bit one-note". They said director Caytha Jentis shows "promise here...by making fine points about masculinity and identity before delivering a nice appropriate ending". In conclusion, they said Novick's performance is "particularly ingratiating", while Prescott was "too stiffly and always looked uncomfortable". David DeWitt wrote in The New York Times there is no chemistry that develops between the actors; "they’re just two guys speaking and pausing with grossly melodramatic weight". He was especially displeased with Prescott, saying he only "offers a face screwed up with discomfort in scene after scene after scene". DeWitt also said the ending of the film was "flatly rendered" as well. Raymond Murray from QFest praised the movie as a "refreshingly funny story with witty dialogue and believable characters".

Gay Celluloid also criticized Prescott's performance saying it was "too forced and somewhat stiff" that "renders the chemistry between him and Novick...all too one-sided". Their review had kind words for Margaret Anne Florence as being a "pure joy throughout", and for Jentis too, saying she "realistically illustrated the love that one man holds for two people of differing sexuality and that of its heart-rendering consequences". The Advocate wrote in their blurb for the DVD, that Jentis's film was "sweet and sturdy and refreshingly full of surprises".
