= Shayesteh Irani =

Iranian actress (born 1979)

- شایسته ایرانی
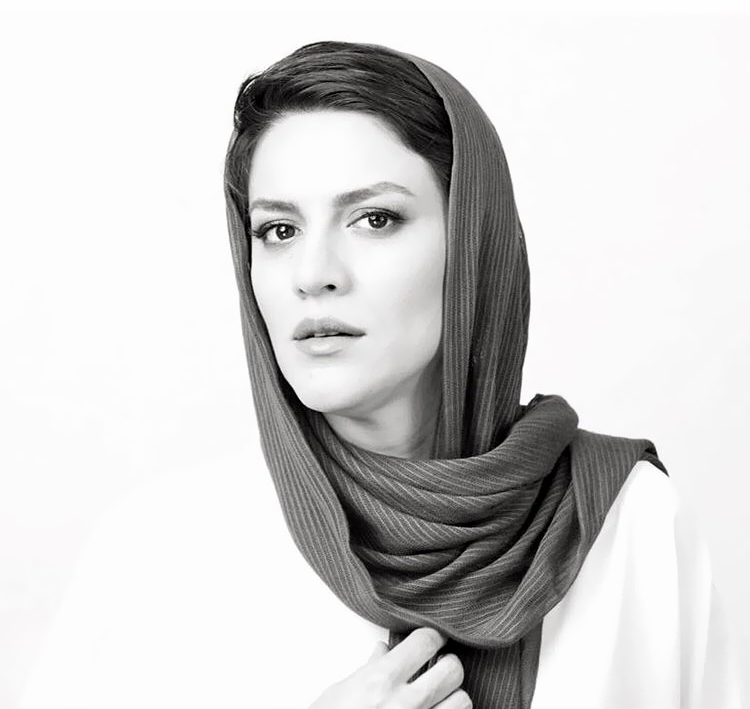
- Shayesteh Irani at the 34th Fajr International Film Festival (2016)
- Born: 23 June 1979 (age 46); Tehran, Iran
- Other names: Sheyesteh Irani
- Education: Islamic Azad University
- Known for: actress

Shayesteh Irani (born 23 June 1979) is an Iranian film, television and stage actress.

== Biography ==
Irani was born on 23 June 1979 in Tehran, Iran. She attended Islamic Azad University, before becoming a movie actress in 2005.

She has starred in several films including Season of Narges (2017), Facing Mirrors (2011), Offside (2006), and The Third Wave (2009).

== Awards and nominations ==
- 2006 – Best Actress for Offside at Gijón International Film Festival, Spain
- 2011 – nominated for the Best Actress Award for Facing Mirrors by Fajr International Film Festival
