= Margaret Anne Florence =

American actress, singer, model

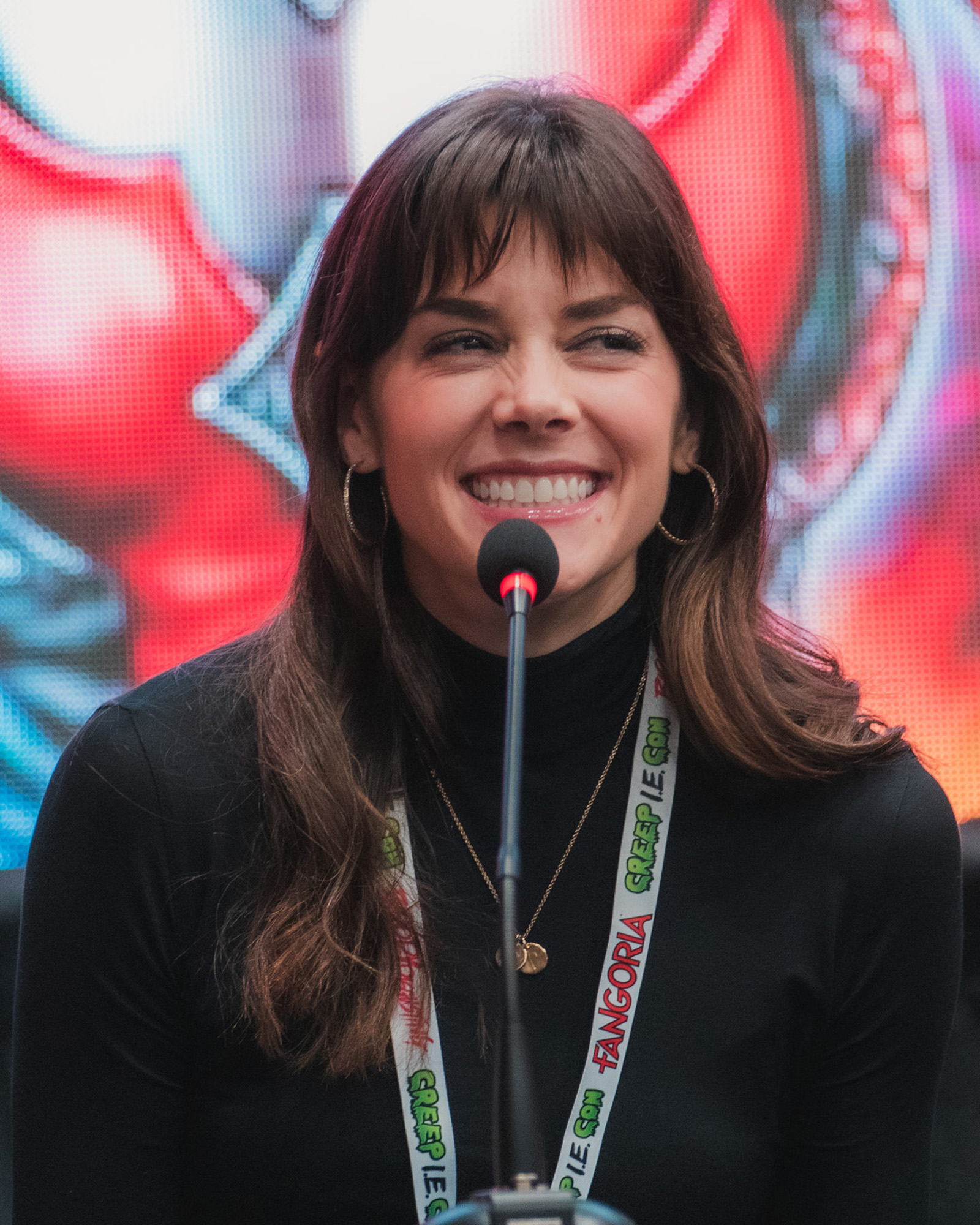
- Florence in 2025
- Education: College of Charleston (BA); New York University (MFA)
- Occupations: Actress; singer; model
- Children: 1

Margaret Anne Florence is an American actress and singer based in New York City.

== Early life ==
Florence was raised in Charleston, South Carolina. She was a member of a local theater company called The Charleston Youth Company.

Florence attended Ashley Hall school in Charleston. She received a Masters in Music Theatre Performance, cum laude, from New York University and a B.A. in Music/Classical Voice, cum laude, from the College of Charleston. She received the Bishop Robert Smith Award, the highest undergraduate honor at the College of Charleston. In 2009, Florence was honored with the College of Charleston's Young Alumna of the Year Award.

== Films ==
=== The Mighty Macs and The One ===
Florence co-starred as Rosemary Keenan, alongside Carla Gugino and Ellen Burstyn, in The Mighty Macs, released nationwide on October 21, 2011 and based on the true story of Basketball Hall of Fame coach Cathy Rush, who led Immaculata University to the 1972 National Women's Collegiate Championship. In 2010, The Mighty Macs won both the Best Feature and Audience Award at the John Paul II International Film Festival in Miami, and was an Official Selection at the Heartland Film Festival and two other independent film festivals. She can be seen in the movie's official trailer, which was released in September 2009.

Florence starred as the female lead in the 2011 film The One, alongside Jon Prescott and Ian Novick.

== Filmography ==
Film roles
Year	Title	Role	Notes
2006	My Super Ex-Girlfriend	Bartender	
2009	The New Daughter	Alexis Danella	
2024	Terrifier 3	Jessica "Jess" Shaw	

== Television ==
Florence appeared on 30 Rock's 2012 hour-long Valentine's Day episode "Hey, Baby, What's Wrong". She appeared in the CBS drama Blue Bloods episode "Brothers" (2010). She had a recurring, three-episode arc as Marlene during Guiding Light's 2007–2008 season. She appeared in the Law & Order episode "Excalibur" (2008), the White Collar episode "Flip of the Coin" (2009), and the Nurse Jackie episode "Apple Bong" (2010). She appeared in 2017 in the series Sun Records, and starred in the 2018 Lifetime TV movie A Sister's Secret.

== Broadway ==
=== The Light in the Piazza ===
Florence was cast in the lead role of Clara Johnson in a 2010 production of The Light in the Piazza, at Washington, D.C.'s Arena Stage.

=== The Fantasticks ===
Beginning on July 21, 2008, Florence starred as 'Luisa' in the revival of the famous Broadway musical The Fantasticks at the Snapple Theater Center (renamed the Jerry Orbach Theater during this run as a credit to that actor's role in the original musical). Florence's final performance as Luisa took place on December 17, 2008.

=== Additional theatrical productions ===
Florence appeared in regional productions of Godspell, Little Shop of Horrors, Maccabeat!, Company, Street Scene (based on the Pulitzer Prize winning play by Elmer Rice), and Jacques Brel is Alive and Well and Living in Paris.

== Other acting ==
Florence starred in Death Cab for Cutie's music video for What Sarah Said from the band's 2005 studio album, Plans. The What Sarah Said video was included in the band's 2006 DVD, Directions: The Plans Video Album, which was nominated for Best Long Form Music Video at the 2007 Grammy Awards.

== Personal life ==
Florence is married and has a son.
