= Paul Bright =

American film director

Paul Bright (born April 15, 1965) is a film writer, director, and editor recognized for his predominantly gay-themed feature films.

== Early life ==
Bright was born in Albuquerque, NM. In 1972, after his mother's death from cancer, his father remarried and moved the family to Los Angeles. He attended the Hamilton High School Musical Theater Program and studied under Don Bondi and Dr. Bill Teaford. During his senior year of high school year, he also attended the Hollywood High Performing Arts Magnet. Later, he studied musical theater at the Dorothy Chandler Pavilion in Los Angeles under Paul Gleason's direction, and took voice training from Nathan Lam and Rickie Wiener.

== Career ==
One Playwright, One Vision, One World. Paul Bright wrote/directed/produced eleven feature films. He began writing short plays as a little kid, and his first feature film script led to meetings at Disney Studios in his early 20s.

In high school, Bright was discovered by an agent at Cunningham, Escott, DiPene Talent Agency of Beverly Hills and was cast in numerous TV commercials, Divorce Court, Loni Anderson's failed TV show Easy Street, and Blake Edwards's comedy film Micki and Maude.

From 2002 to 2004, Bright was the artistic director of the Gaslight Repertory Theater Company south of Austin, Texas, where he produced 32 stage productions in three years. He left the theater company in 2005 to film Angora Ranch.

His original film company name, Silly Bunny Pictures, was a joke between himself and Tim Jones. Later films were released by Paul Bright Films.

== Educational courses ==
Paul Bright is a Udemy instructor with educational courses. These courses include Introduction to Film making, Writing screen plays, Directing your own independent movie, and distribution of your own feature film.

== Filmography ==
=== Feature films ===
Year	Film	Credited Director	Credited Producer	Credited Writer
2006	Angora Ranch	Yes	Yes	Yes
2007	Theft of the Drag Queen's Wig	Yes	Yes	Yes
2009	Aaron Albeit a Sex Hero	Yes	Yes	Yes
2010	Altitude Falling	Yes	Yes	Yes
2011	Abrupt Decision	Yes	Yes	Yes
2012	Goliad Rising	Yes	Yes	Yes
2014	Forgotten Hero	Yes	Yes	Yes
2015	Boston Nightly: Long Term Parking	Yes	Yes	Yes
2017	Prof Tom Foolery Saves The Planet	Yes	Yes	Yes
Unreleased	Stars In His Eyes	Yes	Yes	Yes
2020	Crossing Shaky Ground	Yes	Yes	Yes
2022	Pocket Mouse Protector	Yes	Yes	Yes
