= Homosexuality test =

Homosexuality test may refer to:

- GCC homosexuality test, a proposed test that would be executed at the border control of Kuwait and other member states of the Cooperation Council for the Arab States of the Gulf.
- Fruit machine (homosexuality test), a test measuring pupil dilatation when exposed to pornography
