= Naked as We Came =

- Film poster
- Directed by: Richard LeMay
- Written by: Richard LeMay
- Produced by: Nia Hatsopoulos
- Starring: Ben Weaver; Karmine Alers; Lue McWilliams; Ryan Vigilant
- Cinematography: Vitaly Bokser
- Edited by: Alexander Hammer
- Music by: Adonis Tsilimparis
- Production companies: Garden House Entertainment; Soap Productions
- Release date: September 24, 2012
- Running time: 97 minutes
- Country: United States
- Language: English

Naked as We Came is a 2012 American drama film directed by Richard LeMay and starring Benjamin Weaver, Karmine Alers, Lue McWilliams, and Ryan Vigilant.

== Cast ==
- Benjamin Weaver as Ted
- Karmine Alers as Laura
- Lue McWilliams as Lilly
- Ryan Vigilant as Elliot
- Sturgis Adams as Jeff
- John Challice as Eric

== Awards and nominations ==
- 2012, Won Audience Award" for 'Best Feature' at Cinema Diverse
- 2012, Won Audience Award for 'Best Overall Feature' at Long Island Gay and Lesbian Film Festival
