= Oliver Park =

British horror writer and director (born 1986)

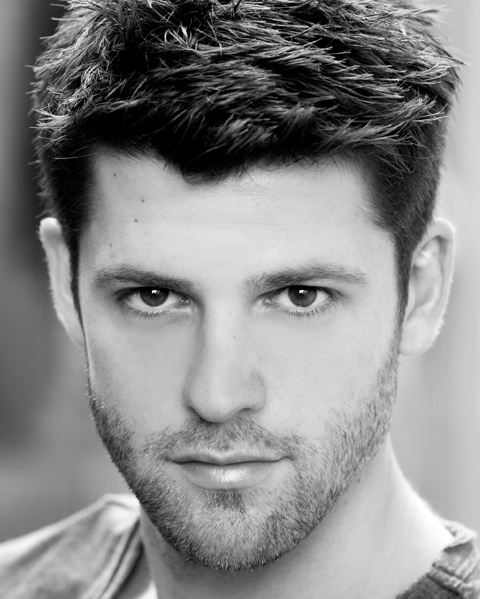
- Born: 13 April 1986 (age 40); Bath, England, United Kingdom
- Occupation: Filmmaker
- Known for: Vicious, Still

Oliver Park (born 13 April 1986) is a British horror writer and director. He is best known for his 2015/2016 short horror Vicious, voted as one of the best short horror films ever made by BuzzFeed. He then went onto make his second short horror Still, released by Eli Roth's Crypt TV in 2017. Based in Bristol, Park is currently developing a number of feature-length film projects.

== Early life ==
Oliver Park was born on 13 April 1986 in Bath, United Kingdom. According to Park, he started writing scary stories and screenplays from a young age, before moving into acting and producing. He studied architecture at Cardiff Metropolitan University (formerly UWIC).

== Career ==
Throughout his twenties, Park had roles in various films and commercials, including Stop/Eject by fellow British filmmaker Neil Oseman, in which he appeared alongside The Worst Witch star Georgina Sherrington. The film was shortlisted for BAFTA 2015. Park also starred in Simon Pearce's 2014 short film Watch Over Me, which went on to win Best Action Short at the New York Film Festival.

In 2016, he released his first short horror, Vicious, which centres around a young woman who returns home one night to find the front door unlocked. The film quickly gained over one million views, winning eight awards including the Gold Award for Best International Film at Toronto After Dark 2015. It was picked up by dedicated horror short channel ALTER in 2019.

In 2017, Park released his second short film, Still, which tells the story of an artist terrorised by a dark figure with a bag over its head. The film was picked up by Crypt TV in December 2017.

In June 2020, Park was reported to be directing a film in his feature directorial debut. Under the working title Abyzou, filming began on 25 January 2021 at Nu Boyana Film Studios, during the COVID-19 pandemic in Bulgaria. Safety measures the production crew followed included mask wearing and regular COVID tests and temperature checks. The film was released under the title of The Offering by Decal on 13 January 2023.

== Filmography ==
Film
Year	Title	Role
2014	Stop/Eject	Actor
2014	Watch Over Me	Actor
2014	Foxtrot One One	Actor
2015/2016	Vicious	Writer, Director
2016/2017	Still	Writer, Director
2023	The Offering/Abyzou	Director

== Awards and nominations ==
Year	Nominated work	Award	Result
2015	Vicious	Gold Award - Best International Film, Toronto After Dark Film Festival	Won
2015	Vicious	Platinum Award - Best Film, LA Horror Competition	Won
2015	Vicious	Favourite Film Award - Best Film, Northern Frights Film Festival	Won
2015	Vicious	Best Director, LA Horror Competition	Nominated
2015	Vicious	Best Short, Buffalo Dreams Film Festival	Nominated
2015	Vicious	Méliès d'Argent, Best European Short	Nominated
