= Jon Prescott =

American actor and model

- Born: August 10, 1981 (age 44); Mountain View, California, U.S.
- Occupations: Film and television actor

Jon Prescott (born August 10, 1981) is an American actor.

== Early life ==
He was born in Mountain View, California, but raised near Portland, Oregon. Prescott has two brothers, and a sister. He attended Emerson College in Boston. After college he moved to Los Angeles.

== Career ==
He hosted OLN's Outdoor Investigations and has also been seen on television in 30 Rock, Rescue Me, CSI: New York, As the World Turns, Watch Over Me, Law & Order, Las Vegas, One Life to Live, Hot Properties, The 1/2 Hour News Hour, Celebrity Apprentice, and the HBO pilot Suburban Shootout. His films include Howl and The Holiday.

Prescott had a recurring role as Mark Flemming on the first season of the Lifetime TV series The Client List in 2012.

In 2012 and 2013, Prescott appeared in ads for Gevalia Kaffe as "Johan", a handsome Swedish spokesman who has an irresistible effect on women.

== TV series ==
| Year | Title | Role | Notes |
|---|---|---|---|
| 2005 | Hot Properties | Nelson Buch | Guest star |
| 2006 | CSI: NY | Nick Gunn | Guest star |
| 2006 | Outdoor Investigations | Lucas Simms | Series regular |
| 2007 | Watch Over Me | Pette Weber | Main cast |
| 2007 | Las Vegas | Jeremy | Guest star |
| 2008 | As the World Turns | Mike Kasnoff | Recurring |
| 2009 | Law & Order | Davey Burke | Guest star |
| 2009 | One Life to Live | Chad Driscoll | Guest star; 3 episodes |
| 2010 | Rescue Me | Memory Hank | Guest star |
| 2010 | 30 Rock | The Guy | cameo |
| 2011 | Law & Order: Criminal Intent | Johnny Apreda | Guest star |
| 2011 | The Good Wife | Andre Felise | Guest star |
| 2011 | Untitled Jersey City Project | Frank George | Series regular |
| 2012 | River Ridge | Brad Rylan | Series Regular |
| 2012 | The Client List | Mark Fleming | Recurring |
| 2018 | American Woman | Barry | Recurring |

== Film ==
| Year | Title | Role |
|---|---|---|
| 2006 | The Holiday | James |
| 2007 | Careless | Jimmy |
| 2009 | Howl | Neal Cassady |
| 2011 | The One | Daniel |
| 2012 | Maladies | Prescott |
| 2012 | Holiday High School Reunion | Craig |
| 2013 | Construction | Aaron |
| 2013 | Christmas in the City | Tom Wolman |
| 2014 | Parts per Billion | Jay |
| 2016 | Seduced | Gavin |
| 2018 | Psycho Daughter | Joseph |
