= List of LGBTQ-related films =

This article lists lesbian, gay, bisexual, transgender, or queer-related films involving representation of fictional and factual LGBTQ people. The list includes films that feature an LGBTQ story, or deal with significant LGBTQ issues. These films may involve participation by LGBTQ cast, producer, director, or crew; or a focus on LGBTQ target audiences.

The English film title, original title, country of origin and production year are listed. Order is alphabetical by title.

There are also lists of LGBTQ films by year, by storyline, by characters, and directed by women.

== 0–9 ==
- $30 (short – Boys Life 3), US (1999)
- 1 Versus 100, US (2020)
- 10 Attitudes, US (2001)
- The 10 Year Plan, US (2014)
- 12 Points, Austria (2015)
- 101 Rent Boys, US (2000)
- 101 Reykjavík, Iceland/Denmark/Norway/France (2000)
- 14h05, France/Switzerland (2007)
- 15 Years, Israel (2019)
- 2 × 4, US (1998)
- 2 Minutes Later, US (2007)
- 2 Seconds (2 secondes), Canada (1998)
- 20 centimeters (20 Centímetros), Spain (2005)
- 200 American, US (2003)
- 2:37, Australia (2006)
- The 24th Day, US (2004)
- 29th and Gay, US (2005)
- 3, Germany (2010)
- 3 Dancing Slaves (Le Clan), France (2004)
- 3-Day Weekend, US (2008)
- 3 Generations, US (2015)
- 3 Kanya (3 কন্যা), India (2012)
- 30 Years from Here, US (2011)
- 306, US (2010)
- 4th Man Out, US (2015)
- 41 Seconds (41 Sekunden), Germany (2006)
- 4.3.2.1, UK (2010)
- 491, Sweden (1964)
- 5ive Girls, Canada (2006)
- 50 Ways of Saying Fabulous, New Zealand (2006)
- 52 Tuesdays, Australia (2013)
- 54, US (1998)
- '68, US (1988)
- 68 Pages, India (2007)
- 7 mujeres, 1 homosexual y Carlos (7 Women, 1 Homosexual and Carlos), Mexico (2004)
- 8 Women (8 femmes), France/Italy (2002)
- 8: The Mormon Proposition, US (2010)
- 88 Minutes, US (2007)
- 9 Dead Gay Guys, UK (2002)

== A ==
- À cause d'un garçon (You'll Get Over It), France (2002)
- À corps perdu (Straight for the Heart), Canada/Switzerland (1988)
- A mi madre le gustan las mujeres (My Mother Likes Women), Spain (2002)
- À toute vitesse (Full Speed), France (1996)
- A un dios desconocido (To an Unknown God), Spain (1977)
- Aaron... Albeit a Sex Hero, US (2009)
- Aban and Khorshid (Aban + Khorshid; آبان و خورشید), US (2014)
- Absent (Ausente), Argentina (2011)
- Academy (アカデミー), Australia/Japan (2007)
- Achilles (short, The Best of Boys in Love), UK (1996)
- Across the Universe, US (2007)
- An Act of Valour, UK (2010)
- Adam, US (2019)
- Adam & Steve, US (2005)
- Adão e Eva (Adam and Eve), Portugal (1995)
- ADHURA (incomplete) (by Ashish Balram Nagpal, India), English/Hindi
- The Adjuster, Canada (1991)
- The Adonis Factor, US (2010)
- Adored (Poco più di un anno fa), Italy (2003)
- The Adventure of Iron Pussy (หัวใจทรนง), Thailand (2003)
- The Adventures of Felix (Drôle de Félix), France (2000)
- The Adventures of Priscilla, Queen of the Desert, Australia (1994)
- The Adventures of Sebastian Cole, US (1998)
- Advise & Consent, US (1962)
- Affinity, UK (2008)
- After Hours, US (1985)
- After Louie, US (2017)
- After Sex, US (2007)
- After Stonewall, US (1999)
- An Afternoon (En eftermiddag), Denmark (2014)
- Afternoon Breezes (風たちの午後), Japan (1980)
- Age 17 (17 anni), Switzerland (2013)
- The Ages of Lulu (Las edades de Lulú), Spain (1990)
- Agnes and His Brothers (Agnes und seine Brüder), Germany (2004)
- Ai no Kotodama (愛の言霊; Words of Devotion), Japan (2008)
- AIDS: Doctors and Nurses Tell Their Stories, UK (2017)
- Aimée & Jaguar, Germany (1999)
- Aishite Imasu 1941 (Mahal Kita 1941), I Love You 1941, Philippines (2004)
- Ajumma! Are You Krazy???, US (2009)
- AKA, UK (2002)
- Akron, US (2015)
- Alaska Is a Drag, US (2012)
- Albert Nobbs, Ireland/UK (2011)
- Aleksandr's Price, US (2013)
- Alex and Leo (Alex und der Löwe), Germany (2010)
- Alex and the Handyman, US (2017)
- Alexander, US (2004)
- Alexander: The Other Side of Dawn, US (1977)
- Alexandria... Why? (إسكندرية ليه), Egypt/Algeria (1978)
- Algie the Miner, US (1912)
- Alice, France (2002)
- Alive and Kicking (Indian Summer), UK (1996)
- All About Anna, Denmark (2005)
- All About Love (得閒炒飯), Hong Kong (2010)
- All About My Father (욕정이 활활), South Korea (2010)
- All About My Mother (Todo sobre mi madre), Spain/France (1999)
- All My Life (طول عمري; Toul omry), Egypt (2008)
- All Of Us Strangers, UK (2023)
- All Over Brazil, UK (2003)
- All Over the Guy, US (2001)
- All Over Me, US (1997)
- All the Queen's Men, Germany/Austria (2001)
- All the Rage, US (1997)
- All That Jazz, US (1979)
- All You Need Is Love – Meine Schwiegertochter ist ein Mann, Germany (2009)
- Alldays: Nichōme no Asahi (ALLDAYS 二丁目の朝日), Japan (2008)
- Alles wird gut (Everything Will Be Fine), Germany (1998)
- Almost Adults, Canada (2017)
- Almost Love, US (2019)
- Almost Normal, US (2005)
- Altitude Falling, US (2010)
- Alto, US (2015)
- Alucarda, Mexico (1978)
- The Amazing Truth About Queen Raquela, Iceland/Philippines/France/Thailand (2008)
- Amen, India (2010)
- American Beauty, US (1999)
- American Buffalo, UK/US (1996)
- An American Crime, US (2007)
- American Girl, US (2002)
- American Vagabond, Finland/Denmark/US (2013)
- Amic/Amat (Beloved/Friend), Spain (1999)
- Amnésie: L'énigme James Brighton, Canada (2005)
- Amor de hombre (Love of a Man), Spain (1997)
- Amores Possíveis (Possible Loves), Brazil (2001)
- Amour de Femme (Combats de Femme), France (2001)
- Amour, toujours..., France (1995)
- Amphetamine (安非他命), Hong Kong (2010)
- An Actor's Revenge (雪之丞変化), Japan (1935)
- An Actor's Revenge (雪之丞変化), Japan (1963)
- Anatomy of a Fall (Anatomie d'une chute), France (2023)
- Anatomy of Hell (Anatomie de l'enfer), France (2004)
- And the Band Played On, US (1993)
- And Then Came Lola, US (2009)
- ... And Then Came Summer, US (2000)
- And Then We Danced (და ჩვენ ვიცეკვეთ), Sweden, Georgia (2019)
- And, There You Are, US (2007)
- And Thou Shalt Love (ואהבת), Israel (2007)
- Anders als die Andern (Different from the Others), Germany (1919)
- Anderson's Cross, US (2010)
- Andre's Mother, US (1990)
- Andrew and Jeremy Get Married, UK (2004)
- Ang Huling Cha-Cha Ni Anita (Anita's Last Cha-Cha), Philippines (2013)
- Ang Lalake sa Parola (The Man in the Lighthouse), Philippines (2007)
- Ang Lalaki sa Buhay ni Selya (The Man in Selya's Life), The Man in Her Life, Philippines (1997)
- Ang Lihim ni Antonio (Antonio's Secret), Philippines (2008)
- Ang Buhay ng Baklitang si Hermie (The Life of Little Gay Hermie), Philippines (2015)
- Ang Pagdadalaga ni Maximo Oliveros (The Blossoming of Maximo Oliveros), Philippines (2005)
- The Angelic Conversation, UK (1985)
- Angels in America, US (2003)
- Anger Management, US (2003)
- Aniel, France (1996)
- Animals, Spain (2012)
- Another Country, UK (1984)
- Another Gay Movie, US (2006)
- Another Gay Sequel: Gays Gone Wild!, US (2008)
- Another Love Story (Otra Historia de Amor), Argentina (1986)
- Another Way (Egymásra nézve), Hungary (1982)
- Another's Body (Чужое тело Chuzhoe telo), Russia (2008)
- Antarctica, Israel (2008)
- Anthem, US (1991)
- Antique (서양골동양과자점 엔티크), Korea (2008)
- Antônia, Brazil (2007)
- Anu Dalam Botol (A Penis in a Bottle), Malaysia (2010)
- Any Day Now, US (2012)
- Any Mother's Son, US (1997)
- Anyone and Everyone, US (2007)
- Apariencias (Appearances), Argentina (2000)
- Apart, US (2010)
- Apart from Hugh, US (1994)
- Apartment Zero, UK/Argentina (1989)
- The Apple Tree, US (2012)
- Appropriate Behaviour, UK (2014)
- The Apprentice, Canada/Denmark/UK/US (2024)
- April's Shower, US (2003)
- Arachnia, US (2003)
- Ararat, Canada (2002)
- The Architect, US (2006)
- Ardhanaari (അർദ്ധനാരി), India (2012)
- Area X, US (2007)
- Arie, Italy/Germany (2005)
- Arisan! (The Gathering), Indonesia (2003)
- Aristotle and Dante Discover the Secrets of the Universe, US (2022)
- Arizona Sky, US (2008)
- Army Daze, Singapore (1996)
- Army of Lovers or Revolt of the Perverts (Armee der Liebenden oder Aufstand der Perverse), Germany (1979)
- Around the Block, Australia (2013)
- The Art of Being Straight, US (2008)
- The Art of Sin, Norway/Sudan (2020)
- Art School Confidential, US (2006)
- As Good as It Gets, US (1997)
- As Is, US (1986)
- As Luck Would Have It (Le Hasard fait bien les choses), Switzerland (2002)
- As You Are, US (2016)
- Ashamed (창피해), South Korea (2010)
- Ashley, US (2013)
- Ask Not, US (2008)
- Astoria, Queens, US (2009)
- Atashi wa juice (アタシはジュース), Japan (1996)
- Atrapadas (Condemned to Hell), Argentina (1984)
- The Attack of the Giant Moussaka (Η Επίθεση του Γιγάντιου Μουσακά), Greece (1999)
- Au Pair, Kansas (The Soccer Nanny), US (2011)
- August, US (2011)
- Ausente (Absent), Argentina (2011)
- Avant que j'oublie (Before I Forget), France (2007)
- Avec mes plans réguliers, j'ai confiance., France (2014)
- Awakening (En forelskelse), Denmark (2008)
- The Awakening of Love (愛するということ; Il Vento e le Rose), Japan/Italy (2009)
- Away (A)wake, US (2005)
- Away With Me, UK/France (2015)
- Away with Words (三條人; 孔雀), Hong Kong/Japan/Singapore (1999)
- An Awfully Big Adventure, UK (1995)
- Azul y no tan rosa (Blue and Not So Pink; My Straight Son), Venezuela (2012)
- Azuloscurocasinegro (DarkBlueAlmostBlack), Spain (2006)

== B ==
- B., Germany (2015)
- B. Monkey, UK/Italy/US (1998)
- The Baby Formula, Canada (2009)
- Baby Love (Comme les autres), France (2008)
- Baby Steps (滿月酒), Taiwan/US (2015)
- Back Room, Spain (1999)
- Back Soon, US (2007)
- Bad Boy Street (Rue des mauvais garçons), US/France (2012)
- Bad Education (La mala educación), Spain (2004)
- Bad Girls Go to Hell, US (1965)
- Bad Romance (花为眉), China (2011)
- Baisers cachés (Hidden Kisses), France (2016)
- Baka Bukas (Maybe Tomorrow), Philippines (2016)
- Ballot Measure 9, US (1995)
- Ballroom Rules, Australia (2012)
- Bam Bam and Celeste, US (2005)
- Bambi, France (2013)
- Bangkok Love Story (เพื่อน...กูรักมึงว่ะ), Thailand (2007)
- Bar Girls, US (1995)
- Barefeet, India/US (2000)
- Barrio Boy, US (2014)
- Basic Instinct, US (1992)
- Bathhouse, Philippines (2006)
- Battle of the Sexes, US (2017)
- Be Like Others (Transsexual in Iran), Iran/UK/US (2008)
- Be Mine, US (2009)
- Be with Me, Singapore (2005)
- Beach Rats, US (2017)
- BearCity, US (2010)
- BearCity 2: The Proposal, US (2012)
- Bear Cub (Cachorro), Spain (2004)
- Beastly Boyz, US (2006)
- Beat, US (2000)
- Beatific Vision, US (2008)
- Beau Travail (Good Work), France (1999)
- Beautiful Boxer (บิวตี้ฟูล บ๊อกเซอร์), Thailand (2003)
- Beautiful Darling, US (2010)
- Beautiful Mystery (巨根伝説: 美しき謎), Japan (1983)
- Beautiful Thing, UK (1996)
- Beauty (Skoonheid), South Africa (2011)
- Beauty and Sadness (美しさと哀しみと), Japan (1965), France (1985)
- Becoming Blond, US (2010)
- Bedrooms and Hallways, UK (1998)
- Beefcake, Canada (1999)
- Before the Bat's Flight Is Done (Mielőtt befejezi röptét a denevér), Hungary (1989)
- Before I Forget (Avant que j'oublie), France (2007)
- Before Night Falls, US (2000)
- Before Stonewall, US (1984)
- Beginners, US (2010)
- Behind the Candelabra, US (2013)
- Being 17 (Quand on a 17 ans), France (2016)
- Being at Home with Claude, Canada (1992)
- Being John Malkovich, US (1999)
- Being Julia, US/Canada/Hungary/UK (2004)
- Beloved/Friend (Amic/Amat), Spain (1999)
- Below Her Mouth, Canada (2016)
- Below the Belt, Canada (short, 1999)
- Ben and Arthur, US (2002)
- Bent, UK/Japan (1997)
- Bent Out of Shape (short), Ireland (1995)
- Benzina (Gasoline), Italy (2001)
- The Berlin Affair (Interno Berlinese), Italy/West Germany (1985)
- Berlin Drifters (伯林漂流), Japan/Germany (2017)
- Best Day Ever, US (2014)
- The Best Day of My Life (Il più bel giorno della mia vita), Italy (2002)
- Best in Show, US (2000)
- The Best Way to Walk (La meilleure façon de marcher), France (1976)
- Better Than Chocolate, Canada (1999)
- Between Here and Now (Between Here & Now), Denmark (2018)
- Between Love & Goodbye, US (2008)
- Between Something & Nothing, US (2008)
- Between Two Women, UK (2000)
- Beyond Gay: The Politics of Pride, Canada (2009)
- Beyond Hatred (Au-delà de la haine), France (2005)
- Beyond Therapy, US (1987)
- Beyond the Valley of the Dolls, US (1970)
- Beyond the Walls (Hors les murs), Belgium/Canada/France (2012)
- Bi.sex.u.al, US (2011)
- BIdentity Crisis (short), US (2011)
- Big Bang Love, Juvenile A (46億年の恋), Japan (2006)
- The Big Brass Ring, US (1999)
- Big Daddy, US (1999)
- Big Eden, US (2000)
- Big Gay Love, US (2013)
- The Big Gay Musical, US (2009)
- Bikini, Sweden (2004)
- Bilitis, France/Italy (1977)
- Billy's Dad Is a Fudge-Packer, short, US (2004)
- Billy's Hollywood Screen Kiss, US (1998)
- Billy Elliot, UK (2000)
- Bilog (Circles), Philippines (2005)
- The Birdcage, US (1996)
- Birthday Cake, US (2013)
- Bishonen (美少年之恋), Hong Kong (1998)
- Bite Marks, US (2011)
- The Bitter Tears of Petra von Kant (Die bitteren Tränen der Petra von Kant), Germany (1972)
- Bizarre Again, France (2022)
- Black Bread (Pa negre), Spain (2010)
- Black Lizard (黒蜥蝪), Japan (1962)
- Black Lizard (黒蜥蝪), Japan (1968)
- Black Stone, South Korea/France (2015)
- Black Swan, US (2010)
- Blackbird, US (2014)
- Blackmail Boy (Οξυγόνο), Greece (2003)
- Blackmail Boys, US (2010)
- Blessing, Salt Lake City (2002)
- Blind Faith, US (1998)
- Blinders, US (2011)
- Blokes, Chile (2010)
- Blonde Cobra, US(1963)
- Blood Out of a Stone, UK (2018)
- BloodSisters: Leather, Dykes and Sadomasochism, USA (1995)
- The Blood Spattered Bride (La novia ensangrentada), Spain (1972)
- Bloomington, US (2010)
- The Blossoming of Maximo Oliveros (Ang Pagdadalaga ni Maximo Oliveros), Philippines (2005)
- Blow Dry, US/UK/Germany (2001)
- Blow Job, US (1964)
- Blue, UK (1993)
- Blue, Japan (2001)
- Blue and Not So Pink (Azul y no tan rosa; My Straight Son), Venezuela (2012)
- Blue Citrus Hearts, US (2003)
- Blue Gate Crossing (藍色大門), Taiwan/France (2002)
- Blush (Barash), Israel (2015)
- Boat Trip, US (2003)
- Bobbie's Girl, Ireland (2002)
- Bob's New Suit, US (2009)
- Body Without Soul (Tělo bez duše), Czech Republic (1994)
- Bohemian Rhapsody, UK/US (2018)
- Boiler-house № 6 (short), Russia (1997)
- Bol (بول), Pakistan (2011)
- Bollywood and Vine, US (2004)
- Bombay Boys, India (1998)
- Bomgay, India (1996)
- Bongja (봉자), Korea (2000)
- Bonsoir, France (1994)
- Boogie Nights, US (1997)
- Boogie Woogie, UK (2009)
- The Book Club, US (2006)
- Bookends, US (2008)
- Booking, Philippines (2009)
- Booksmart, US (2019)
- Boomerang (Comme un boomerang), France (2004)
- The Boondock Saints, US (1999)
- Borat, US (2006)
- Born in 68 (Nés en 68), France (2008)
- Born in Flames, US (1983)
- Borstal Boy, UK/Ireland (2000)
- Bottoms, US (2023)
- Boulevard, US (2014)
- Bound, US (1996)
- Bowser Makes A Movie, US (2005)
- Boy, Philippines (2009)
- The Boy and the Wind (O Menino e o Vento), Brazil (1967)
- Boy Culture, US (2006)
- Boy Erased, US (2018)
- The Boy Foretold by the Stars, Philippines (2020)
- Boy, Girl, Canada (1987)
- Boy Meets Boy (소년, 소년을 만나다), Korea (2008)
- Boy Meets Girl, US (2014)
- A Boy Named Sue, US (2000)
- The Boy with the Sun in His Eyes, US (2009)
- Boyfriends, UK (1996)
- Boygame, Sweden (2013)
- Boy's Choir (独立少年合唱団), Japan (2000)
- Boys, US (2016)
- Boys Don't Cry, US (1999)
- Boys in Brazil (Do Lado de Fora), Brazil (2014)
- The Boys in the Band, US (1970)
- The Boys in the Band, US (2020)
- Boys in the Sand, US (1971)
- Boys Love (ボーイズ ラブ), Japan (2006)
- Boys Love, the Movie (ボーイズ ラブ 劇場版), Schoolboy Crush, Japan (2007)
- The Boys of San Francisco, US (1980)
- Boys on the Side, US (1995)
- Boys Village, UK/Germany (2011)
- Boystown (Chuecatown), Spain (2007)
- BPM (Beats per Minute) (120 battements par minute), France (2017)
- Brace, UK (2015)
- The Brandon Teena Story, US (1998)
- Bramadero, Mexico (2007)
- Breakfast? (Frühstück?), Germany (2002)
- Breakfast on Pluto, Ireland (2005)
- Breakfast with Scot, Canada (2007)
- Breaking Fast, US (2020)
- Breaking Free, India (2015)
- Breaking the Girls, US (2013)
- Breaking the Code, UK (1996)
- Breaking the Surface: The Greg Louganis Story, US (1997)
- Breath (Zucht), Netherlands (2007)
- Breathe In, Breathe Out (Вдох-Выдох; Vdokh, vydokh), Russia (2006)
- Bridegroom, US (2013)
- Brideshead Revisited, UK (1981)
- Brideshead Revisited, UK (2008)
- Bridget Jones: The Edge of Reason, UK/France/Germany/Ireland/US (2004)
- Bright Spell (L'embellie), France (2000)
- Bright Young Things, UK (2003)
- Broadway Damage, US (1997)
- Broderskab (Brotherhood), Denmark (2009)
- Brokeback Mountain, US (2005)
- Broken Embraces (Los abrazos rotos), Spain (2009)
- The Broken Hearts Club: A Romantic Comedy, US (2000)
- Broken Hearts Trip, Philippines (2023)
- Broken Sky (El Cielo Dividido), Mexico (2006)
- The Broken Tower, US (2011)
- Brother to Brother, US (2004)
- Brotherhood (Broderskab), Denmark (2009)
- The Brothers Sinclair, US (2011)
- Bruised, US (2020)
- Brüno, US (2009)
- The Bubble (הבועה), Israel (2006)
- Buddies, US (1985)
- Buddy, India (Kerala) (2013)
- Buddy, Netherlands (2015)
- Buffering (窗外), Hong Kong (2003)
- Buffering, UK (2011)
- Bug, France (2003)
- Bugcrush, US (2006)
- Bugis Street (妖街皇后), Hong Kong/Singapore (1995)
- Build, Canada (2004)
- Bulgarian Lovers (Los Novios búlgaros), Spain (2003)
- Bully, US (2001)
- Bungee Jumping of Their Own (번지점프를 하다), Korea (2001)
- Burger, UK/Norway (2013)
- Burlesk King, Philippines (1999)
- Burlesque, US (2010)
- Burned, US (2008)
- Burning Blue, US (2013)
- The Burning Boy, Australia (2001)
- Burnt Money (Plata quemada), Argentina/France/Spain/Uruguay (2000)
- The Business of Fancydancing, US (2002)
- But I'm a Cheerleader, US (1999)
- Butch Camp, US (1996)
- The Butch Factor: What Kind of Man Are You?, US (2009)
- The Butcher's Wife, US (1991)
- Butch Jamie, US (2007)
- Butley, UK/Canada/US (1974)
- Butterfly (Hu Die; 蝴蝶), Hong Kong (2004)
- Butterfly Kiss, UK (1995)
- By Hook or by Crook, US (2001)

== C ==
- Cabalerno, US (2006)
- Cabaret, US (1972)
- Cachorro (Bear Cub), Spain (2004)
- Cage Without a Key, US (1975)
- Caged, US (1950)
- Caged (Uitgesproken), Netherlands (2013)
- Cairo Calling, Canada (2005)
- Cake and Sand (Torten im Sand), Germany (2010)
- The Cakemaker (Der Kuchenmacher, האופה מברלין), Germany/Israel (2017)
- Cal, UK (2013)
- Caligula, US (1979)
- Call Me by Your Name, Brazil, France, Italy, US (2017)
- Call Me Kuchu, US (2012)
- Call Me Malcolm, US (2004)
- Camellia Project: Three Queer Stories at Bogil Island (동백꽃), South Korea (2006)
- Camp, US (2003)
- Campaign of Hate: Russia and Gay Propaganda, US (2014)
- Campfire (Kampvuur), Belgium (2000)
- Camping Cosmos, Belgium (1996)
- Candy Boy, France (2007)
- Candy Rain (愛情糖果雨), Taiwan (2008)
- Can't Stop the Music, US (1980)
- The Canyons, US (2013)
- Capital Games, US (2013)
- Capote, Canada/US (2005)
- Cappuccino, Switzerland (2010)
- Captain Marvel, US (2019)
- Caramel (سكر بنات), Lebanon (2007)
- The Carmilla Movie, Canada (2017)
- Carandiru, Brazil/Argentina (2003)
- Caravaggio, UK (1986)
- Carícies (Caresses), Spain (1998)
- Carmelita Tropicana, US (1994)
- Carmen from Kawachi (河内カルメン), Japan (1966)
- Carol, US (2015)
- Carolyn Gage: On Stage and Off, US (2016)
- Carrington, UK (1995)
- The Case of O (Le cas d'O), France (2003)
- Castration Movie, Canada (2024-2025)
- Casualty, US (1999)
- Cat on a Hot Tin Roof, US (1958)
- The Celluloid Closet, France/UK/Germany/US (1995)
- Centre of My World (Die Mitte der Welt), Germany (2016)
- Ceux qui m'aiment prendront le train (Those Who Love Me Can Take the Train), France (1998)
- Chabuca, Peru (2024)
- Challengers, US (2024)
- Chacun sa nuit (One to Another), France/Denmark (2006)
- Chance, UK (2015)
- Chandigarh Kare Aashiqui, India (2021)
- Change of Life, US (2009)
- Change of Sex (Cambio de sexo), Spain (1976)
- Changing Times (Les temps qui changent), France (2004)
- Chanthupottu (ചാന്ത്‌പൊട്ട്), India (2005)
- Chasing Amy, US (1997)
- Chateau de Roses (シャトー・デ・ローゼス), Japan (2005)
- Cheerleader Queens (ว้ายบึ้ม! เชียร์กระหึ่มโลก), Thailand (2003)
- The Chef's Letter, UK (2008)
- Chef's Special (Fuera de carta), Spain (2008)
- Cheila: una casa pa' Maíta, Venezuela (2010)
- Chelsea Girls, US (1967)
- Chez Nous, Netherlands (2013)
- Chicken, Ireland (2001)
- Chicken Tikka Masala, UK (2005)
- Children of God, Bahamas (2009)
- The Children's Hour, US (1961)
- The Chinese Botanist's Daughters (植物园; Les Filles du botaniste), France/Canada (2006)
- Chinese Characters, US (1986)
- Chitrangada: The Crowning Wish (চিত্রাঙ্গদা), India (2012)
- Chloe, US/Canada/France (2009)
- A Chorus Line, US (1985)
- Chouchou, France (2003)
- Chris & Don: A Love Story, US (2007)
- The Christmas House, US (2020)
- Christopher and Gordy, Norway (2005)
- Christopher and His Kind, UK (2011)
- Chromophobia (Chromophobie), Tunisia (2019)
- Chuck & Buck, US (2000)
- Chuecatown (Boystown), Spain (2007)
- Chutney Popcorn, US (1999)
- Ci qing (刺青; Spider Lilies), Taiwan (2007)
- Ciao, US (2008)
- Ciao Bella, Sweden (2007)
- Cibrâil (The Visitor), Germany (2011)
- The Circle (Der Kreis), Switzerland (2014)
- Circles (Bilog), Philippines (2005)
- Circuit, US (2001)
- Circumstance (شرایط), Iran (2011)
- Citizens of Perpetual Indulgence, US (2000)
- City of Lost Souls (Stadt der verlorenen Seelen), Germany (1983)
- The City of No Limits (En la ciudad sin límites), Spain/Argentina (2002)
- City Without Baseball (無野之城), Hong Kong (2008)
- Claire, US (2001)
- Claire of the Moon, US (1992)
- Clancy's Kitchen, UK (1996)
- Clapham Junction, UK (2007)
- Clay Farmers, US (1988)
- Close, France/Belgium/Netherlands (2022)
- Close to Leo (Tout contre Léo), France (2002)
- The Closet (Le Placard), France (2001)
- Closet Monster, Canada (2015)
- Closets, UK (2015)
- Clothes & Blow, UK (2018)
- Cloud Atlas, Germany (2012)
- Cloudburst, Canada (2011)
- Clueless, US (1995)
- The Cockettes, US (2002)
- Cockles and Muscles (Crustacés et Coquillages), Côte d'Azur, France (2005)
- Coby, France (2017)
- Coffee at Laundromat, Canada (2016)
- Coffee Date, US (2006)
- Cognitio, Denmark (2018)
- C.O.G., US (2013)
- Coklat Stroberi (Chocolate Strawberry), Indonesia (2007)
- Cold Showers (Douches froides), France (2005)
- Cold breath, Iran ( 2017 )
- Colma: The Musical, US (2006)
- Colonel Redl (Oberst Redl), Redl ezredes, Hungary/Austria/West Germany (1985)
- The Colonel's Outing, New Zealand (2011)
- Colonial Gods, US/UK (2009)
- The Color of Fame (El tinte de la fama), Venezuela (2008)
- Color of Night, US (1994)
- The Color Purple, US (1985)
- Colour Blossoms (桃色), Hong Kong (2004)
- Colour Me Kubrick, UK/France (2005)
- The Colour of His Hair, UK (2017)
- Come Back to the Five and Dime, Jimmy Dean, Jimmy Dean, US (1982)
- Come Closer (קרוב אלי), Israel/Italy (2024)
- Come non-detto (Tell No One), Italy (2012)
- Come Undone (Presque rien), Almost Nothing, France/Belgium (2000)
- Coming Out, East Germany (1989)
- Coming Out, Hungary (2013)
- Coming Out Under Fire, US (1994)
- Comme les autres (Baby Love), France (2008)
- Comme un frère (Like a Brother), France (2005)
- The Commitment (Kasal), Philippines (2014)
- Common Ground, US (2000)
- Common Threads: Stories from the Quilt, US (1989)
- Communication, New Zealand (2010)
- Como Esquecer (So Hard to Forget), Brazil (2010)
- Comolot (Kissed), short film, Malaysia (2007)
- Concussion, US (2013)
- Condo, Philippines (2008)
- The Conformist (Il conformista), Italy/France/West Germany (1970)
- Confused Feelings (La Confusion des sentiments), France/West Germany (1981)
- Connie and Carla, US (2004)
- The Conrad Boys, US (2006)
- Consequences, Slovenia (2018)
- Consenting Adult, US (1985)
- The Consul of Sodom (El cónsul de Sodoma), Spain (2009)
- Contact, Australia (2002)
- Contadora Is for Lovers, US/Panama (2006)
- Continental, US (2013)
- Contracorriente (Undertow), Peru (2009)
- Contradictions, France (2002)
- Conversation Piece (Gruppo di famiglia in un interno), Italy (1974)
- Cooper & Hemingway: The True Gen, US (2013)
- Copycat, US (1995)
- Cosas de amigos, Peru (2022)
- The Cost of Love, UK (2011)
- Costa Brava, Spain (1995)
- Côte d'Azur (Crustacés et Coquillages), Cockles and Muscles, France (2005)
- Couch, US (1964)
- The Country Teacher (Venkovský učitel), Czech Republic/France/Germany (2008)
- Cowboy, Germany (2008)
- Cowboy Forever, France (2006)
- Cowboy Junction, US (2004)
- Cowboys & Angels, Ireland/Germany/UK (2003)
- Cracks, Ireland/UK (2009)
- Cradle Will Rock, US (1999)
- Crash, Canada/UK (1996)
- C.R.A.Z.Y., Canada (2005)
- Credence
- Criminal Lovers (Les Amants criminels), France (1999)
- CrossRoad (Crossroad), UK (2016)
- Crossing (Dress to Kill), Canada (2005)
- Cruel Intentions, US (1999)
- Cruise Patrol, Netherlands (2013)
- Cruising, US (1980)
- Crutch, US (2004)
- Crush, New Zealand (1992)
- The Crying Game, UK (1992)
- Cthulhu, US (2007)
- Cu4tro, Peru (2009)
- Cuatro Lunas (Four Moons), Mexico (2014)
- Cubby, US (2019)
- Cul-de-sac, UK (2010)
- The Curiosity of Chance, US/Belgium (2006)
- Curious Thing, US (2010)
- Curse of the Queerwolf, US (1988)
- Cursed, US/Germany (2005)
- Cut Sleeve Boys (我愛斷背衫), UK/Hong Kong (2007)

== D ==
- The D Train, US (2015)
- Daddy & Papa, US (2002)
- D'Agostino, US/Greece (2012)
- Dahmer, US (2002)
- Dakan, Guinea/France (1997)
- Dallas Buyers Club, US (2013)
- The Damned (La caduta degli dei; Die Verdammten), Italy/Germany (1969)
- Dangerous Living: Coming Out in the Developing World, US (2003)
- Dániel, UK (2015)
- Daniel endormi, France (1988)
- The Danish Girl, US (2016)
- Daphne, UK (2007)
- Dare, US (2005)
- Dare, US (2009)
- The Dark Place, US (2014)
- The Dark Side of Tomorrow (Just the Two of Us), US (1970)
- DarkBlueAlmostBlack (azuloscurocasinegro), Spain (2006)
- Darmiyaan: In Between, India (1997)
- Dating Amber, Ireland (2020)
- Das Tagebuch einer Verlorenen (Diary of a Lost Girl), Germany (1929)
- Dasepo Naughty Girls (다세포 소녀), South Korea (2006)
- Date and Switch, US (2014)
- A Date for Mad Mary, Ireland (2016)
- Daughters of the Sun (دختران خورشید), Iran (2000)
- David, Mexico (2005)
- David's Birthday (Il compleanno), Italy (2009)
- David Searching, US (1997)
- David's Secret (O Segredo de Davi), Brazil (2018)
- Dawn, UK (2016)
- Daybreak, Philippines (2008)
- Days (Giorni), Italy (2001)
- The Days of Being Dumb (亞飛與亞基), Hong Kong (1992)
- Deb and Sisi, Canada (2008)
- D.E.B.S., US (2003)
- D.E.B.S., US (2004)
- Dead Poets Society, US (1989)
- Deadly Skies, Canada/US (2005)
- Dear Boys (Lieve Jongens), Netherlands (1980)
- Dear Jesse, US (1998)
- Death at a Funeral, US (2010)
- Death in Venice (Morte a Venezia), Italy/France (1971)
- The Death of Mikel (La Muerte de Mikel), Spain (1984)
- Death of a Poetess (Mot HaMeshoreret), Israel (2017)
- Deathtrap, US (1982)
- Dedicato al mare Egeo (エーゲ海に捧ぐ; Offering in the Aegean), Italy/Japan (1979)
- Deep End, Canada (2011)
- The Deep End, US (2001)
- The Deep Red (深紅; Shinku), Japan (2005)
- Défense d'aimer, France (2002)
- Deflated, US (2012)
- Defying Gravity, US (1997)
- Deliverance, US (1972)
- De-Lovely, US (2004)
- Delphinium: A Childhood Portrait of Derek Jarman, US/UK (2009)
- The Delta, US (1996)
- Denied, US (2004)
- Der bewegte Mann (Maybe, Maybe Not), Germany (1994)
- Der Einstein des Sex (The Einstein of Sex: Life and Work of Dr. M. Hirschfeld), Germany (1999)
- Der junge Törless (Young Törless), West Germany/France (1966)
- Der Kreis (The Circle), Switzerland (2014)
- Der Schuh des Manitu, Germany (2001)
- Der Spalt (The Gap – Mindcontrol), Germany (2014)
- Des parents pas comme les autres (Same-Sex Parents), France (2001)
- Descongélate!, Spain (2003)
- Desde allá (From Afar), Venezuela/Mexico (2015)
- Desert Hearts, US (1985)
- Desire Street, Spain, China, US (2011)
- Desperate Living, US (1977)
- Desperate Remedies, New Zealand (1993)
- Dessous, Germany (2000)
- Destricted, US/UK (2005)
- The Detective, US (1968)
- Diamonds Are Forever, UK/US (1971)
- Diana, UK (2009)
- Diary of a Lost Girl (Das Tagebuch einer Verlorenen), Germany (1929)
- The Dickson Experimental Sound Film, US (1895)
- Die Büchse der Pandora (Pandora's Box), Germany (1929)
- Die andere Liebe (The Other Love), East Germany (1988)
- Die Konsequenz (The Consequence), Germany (1977)
- Die Mitte der Welt (Center of My World), Germany (2016)
- Die, Mommie, Die!, US (2003)
- Diferente, Spain (1962)
- Different for Girls, UK (1996)
- Different from the Others (Anders als die Andern), Germany (1919)
- Different from Whom? (Diverso da chi?), Italy (2009)
- Different from You and Me (Anders als du und ich (§175); Bewildered Youth), Germany (1957)
- A Different Story, US (1978)
- Different Strokes, US (1997)
- Dim Sum Funeral, Canada/US (2008)
- Dino at the Beach, US (2022)
- The Deputy (El Diputado), Spain (1978)
- Dirty Girl, US (2010)
- Dirty Laundry, US (2006)
- Dish (Dish :)), US (2009)
- Disobedience, UK, Ireland, US (2017)
- Diverso da chi? (Different from Whom?), Italy (2009)
- Do Começo ao Fim (From Beginning to End), Brazil (2009)
- Do Lado de Fora (Boys in Brazil), Brazil (2014)
- Dog Day Afternoon, US (1975)
- Dog Tags, US (2008)
- Do I Love You?, UK (2002)
- Do Paise Ki Dhoop, Chaar Aane Ki Baarish, India (2009)
- Do Revenge, US (2022)
- Do-Nut (โด๋-นัท), Thailand (2011)
- The Doctor's Wife, Australia (2011)
- Doing Time on Maple Drive, US (1992)
- Don Juan, or If Don Juan Were a Woman (Don Juan ou Si Don Juan était une femme...), France/Italy (1973)
- Doña Herlinda y su hijo (Dona Herlinda and Her Son), México (1985)
- Donne-moi la main (Give Me Your Hand), France (2008)
- Don't Blame Jack, UK (2019)
- Don't Tell Anyone (No se lo digas a nadie), Peru/Spain (1998)
- The Doom Generation, US (1995)
- Doors Cut Down (En malas compañías), Spain (2000)
- Dorian Blues, US (2004)
- Dorian Gray, UK (2009)
- Dostana (दोस्ताना), India (2008)
- Dotonbori River (道頓堀川), Japan (1982)
- Doubt (Duda), Philippines (2003)
- Down the River (ตามสายน้ำ; Tam sai nam), Thailand (2004)
- Downing, UK (2011)
- Downton Abbey, UK, US (2019)
- Downton Abbey: A New Era, UK, US (2022)
- Dream Boy, US (2008)
- Dream for an Insomniac, US (1996)
- Dream Kitchen, Ireland (1999)
- Dream On, UK (2013)
- The Dreamers, US (2003)
- Dressed to Kill, US (1980)
- The Dresser, UK (1983)
- Drift, Canada (2000)
- Drifting (נגוע), Israel (1983)
- Drifting Flowers (漂浪青春), Taiwan (2008)
- Drive-Away Dolls, US (2024)
- Drôle de Félix (The Adventures of Felix), France (2000)
- Drool, US (2009)
- Drown, Australia (2015)
- Drowning, Australia (2009)
- Du er ikke alene (You Are Not Alone), Denmark (1978)
- Duda (Doubt), Philippines (2003)
- The Duke of Burgundy, UK/Hungary (2014)
- D'une rive à l'autre, Canada (2009)
- Dungarees, UK (2020)
- Dunno Y... Na Jaane Kyon (Don't Know Why; ডাননো ওয়াই... না জানে কিঁউ), India (2010)
- Dusk, UK (2017)
- The Dying Gaul, US (2005)
- The Dying Inmate (Selda), Philippines (2008)

== E ==
- An Early Frost, US (1985)
- An Early Frost (Gelée précoce), France (1999)
- East Palace, West Palace (东宫西宫), China (1996)
- East Side Story, US (2006)
- Eastern Boys, France (2013)
- Easy A, US (2010)
- Easy Money (Dinero fácil), Spain (2010)
- Eat with Me, US (2014)
- Eating Out, US (2004)
- Eating Out 2: Sloppy Seconds, US (2006)
- Eating Out 3: All You Can Eat, US (2009)
- Eating Out 4: Drama Camp, US (2011)
- Eating Out 5: The Open Weekend, US (2011)
- Eban and Charley, US (2000)
- Echte Kerle (Regular Guys), Germany (1996)
- The Eclipse: Courtship of the Sun and Moon (L'éclipse du soleil en pleine lune), France (1907)
- eCupid, US (2011)
- The Edge of Heaven (Yaşamın Kıyısında), Auf der anderen Seite, Turkey/Germany (2007)
- Edge of Seventeen, US (1998)
- Edward II, UK (1991)
- Ed Wood, US (1994)
- Een Vrouw als Eva (A Woman Like Eve), Netherlands (1979)
- Efren's Paradise (Sa Paraiso ni Efren), Philippines (1999)
- Egghead & Twinkie, US (2023)
- Eighteen, Canada (2004)
- Eko Eko Azarak (エコエコアザラク), Wizard of Darkness, Japan (1995)
- Ekaj, US (2015)
- El abuelo, US (2008)
- El cónsul de Sodoma (The Consul of Sodom), Spain (2009)
- El diputado (The Deputy), Spain (1978)
- El Favor, Argentina (2004)
- El hombre de la mandolina, Mexico (1985)
- El mar (The Sea), Spain (2000)
- Elena Undone, US (2010)
- Elephant, US (2003)
- Eleven Men Out (Strákarnir okkar), Iceland (2005)
- Elle ou lui (Sexy Dancing), France (1999)
- Elliot Loves, US (2012)
- Eloïse's Lover (Eloïse), Spain (2009)
- Embrassez qui vous voudrez (Summer Things), France/UK/Italy (2002)
- Emilia Pérez, France (2024)
- Emporte-moi (Set Me Free), Canada/Switzerland/France (1999)
- An Empty Bed, US (1989)
- En kort en lang (Shake It All About), Denmark/Germany (2001)
- En la Gama de los Grises (In the Grayscale), Chile (2015)
- En malas compañías (Doors Cut Down) (included in short film collection Boys Briefs 2), Spain (2000)
- En Soap, Denmark (2006)
- End of Love (愛到盡), Hong Kong/China (2009)
- The Endless Possibility of Sky, US (2012)
- Enduring Love, UK (2004)
- An Englishman Abroad, UK (1983)
- An Englishman in New York, UK (2009)
- Entertaining Mr. Sloane, UK (1970)
- Enter the Clowns (丑角登场), China (2002)
- Enter the Phoenix (大佬愛美麗), Hong Kong (2004)
- Entre Nous, France (1983)
- Entre tinieblas (Dark Habits), Spain (1983)
- Ernest and Bertram, US (2002)
- Ernesto, Italy (1979)
- Ernesto, Italy (2020)
- Espacio 2, Spain (2001)
- Esteros, Aregentina/Brazil/France (2016)
- Eternal Summer (盛夏光年), Taiwan (2006)
- Ethan Mao, Canada/US (2004)
- Eulogy, US (2004)
- Europa Europa, Germany/Poland/France (1990)
- The Everlasting Secret Family, Australia (1988)
- Even Cowgirls Get the Blues, US (1993)
- An Evening (En Aften), Denmark (2016)
- Evening Shadows, India (2018)
- The Event, Canada/US (2003)
- Everyone, Canada (2004)
- Everything Everywhere All at Once, US (2022)
- Everything Relative, US (1996)
- Execution of Justice, US (1999)
- Exotica, Canada (1994)
- An Eye for an Eye, US (2004)
- Eyes Wide Open (עיניים פקוחות), Israel (2009)

== F ==
- F. est un salaud (Fögi Is a Bastard), France/Switzerland (1998)
- Fabulous! The Story of Queer Cinema, US (2006)
- Facing Windows (La Finestra di fronte), Italy (2003)
- Fagbug, US (2009)
- Fag Hag, US (1998)
- Fair Haven, US (2016)
- Fairies, US (2003)
- Fake (OVA, 2007)
- Fake ID, US (2003)
- Fall Away, US (2010)
- The Fall of '55, US (2006)
- The Falls, US (2012)
- The Falls: Testament of Love, US (2013)
- Fame, US (1980)
- Family Affair (Assunto de Família), Brazil (2011)
- A Family Affair, US (2001)
- Family Album, US (1994)
- Family Outing (Family Outing: A True Story), Australia (2001)
- The Family Stone, US (2005)
- Family Tree (L'Arbre et la forêt), France (2010)
- The Fan, US (1981)
- FAQs, US (2005)
- Far from Heaven, US (2002)
- Far West, France (2003)
- Farewell My Concubine (霸王别姬), China (1993)
- Farewell, My Queen (Les Adieux à la reine), France (2012)
- Fashion Victims (Reine Geschmacksache), Germany (2007)
- Fast Forward, Belgium (2004)
- Fast Trip, Long Drop, US (1993)
- Fat Girls, US (2007)
- Fatherhood Dreams, Canada (2007)
- Father Knows..., US (2007)
- The Favourite, UK/US (2018)
- Fear Street Part One: 1994, US (2021)
- The Feast of Stephen, US (2009)
- Feeding Boys, Ayaya (哎呀呀, 去哺乳), China (2003)
- Félix et le poisson, Mexico/Cuba/Canada (2011)
- Fellini Satyricon, Italy (1969)
- Female Cats (女猫), Japan (1983)
- Female Perversions, US/Germany (1996)
- Female Trouble, US (1974)
- Ferkel (Piglets), Germany (1999)
- A Ferret Called Mickey, Ireland (2003)
- Fight Club, US (1999)
- Fighting Tommy Riley, US (2005)
- Filibus, Italy (1915)
- Final Exams (Les résultats du bac), France (2001)
- Finding Me, US (2009)
- Finding Me: Truth, US (2011)
- Finding Mr. Wright, US (2011)
- Finding North, US (1998)
- Finding Phong (Đi Tìm Phong), Vietnam (2015)
- Fine Dead Girls (Fine mrtve djevojke), Nice Dead Girls, Croatia (2002)
- Fine Young Men (Hombres íntegros), Mexico/Spain/France (2024)
- Fingersmith, UK (2005)
- Fire (फायर), India/Canada (1996)
- Fire Island, US, (2022)
- The Fire That Burns (La Ville dont le prince est un enfant), France (1997)
- Firebird, UK/Estonia (2021)
- Fireworks, US (1947)
- First Girl I Loved, US (2016)
- First Love (初戀 Hatsu-koi), Japan (2007)
- Fish and Elephant (今年夏天), China (2001)
- Fish Can't Fly, US (2005)
- The fish curry (Maacher Jhol), India (2017)
- FIT, UK (2010)
- Five Dances, US (2013)
- Five Senses of Eros (오감도), Korea (2009)
- Fixing Frank, US (2002)
- Flaming Creatures, US (1963)
- Flaming Ears, Austria (1992)
- The Flavor of Corn (Il sapore del grano), Italy (1986)
- Flawless, US (1999)
- Flawless, Israel (2018)
- Fleeing by Night (夜奔), Taiwan/China (2000)
- Flesh, US (1968)
- Flight of the Cardinal, US (2010)
- Flirt, US/Germany/Japan (1995)
- Flirting with Anthony, US (2005)
- Floating, US (1997)
- Floating Skyscrapers (Płynące wieżowce), Poland (2013)
- Flores Raras (Reaching for the Moon), Brazil (2013)
- A Florida Enchantment, US (1914)
- Flow, Canada/US (1996)
- Flower and Snake 3 (花と蛇3), Japan (2010)
- The Fluffer, US (2001)
- Fluidø, Germany (2017)
- Flying with One Wing, Sri Lanka (2002)
- Fögi Is a Bastard (F. est un salaud), France/Switzerland (1998)
- Folle d'elle, France (1998)
- Follow Me (Volg mij), Belgium (2015)
- Followers, UK/Australia (2015)
- Food of Love, Germany/Spain (2002)
- For a Lost Soldier (Voor een verloren soldaat), Netherlands (1992)
- For Dorian, Canada (2012)
- For the Bible Tells Me So, US (2006)
- For the Time Being (Le moment venu), France (2006)
- Forbidden Fruit, Germany/Zimbabwe (2000)
- Forbidden Love: The Unashamed Stories of Lesbian Lives, Canada (1992)
- Foreign Lovers, US (2017)
- Forever Fever, Singapore (1998)
- Forgive and Forget, UK (2000)
- Formula 17 (十七歲的天空), Taiwan (2004)
- Fortune and Men's Eyes, Canada/US (1971)
- Fotostar, Switzerland (2003)
- A Four Letter Word, US (2007)
- Four Moons (Cuatro lunas), Mexico (2014)
- Four More Years (Fyra år till), Sweden (2010)
- Four Quartets, UK (2018)
- Four Weddings and a Funeral, UK (1994)
- Four Windows (Vier Fenster), Germany (2006)
- The Four-Faced Liar, US (2010)
- The Fourth Man (De vierde man), Netherlands (1983)
- The Fox, US (1967)
- Fox and His Friends (Faustrecht der Freiheit), Germany (1975)
- Foxcatcher, US (2014)
- Framed Youth: The Revenge of the Teenage Perverts, UK (1983)
- Frank's Cock, Canada (1993)
- Franswa Sharl, Australia (2009)
- Free Fall (Freier Fall), Germany (2013)
- Freebie and the Bean, US (1974)
- Freeheld, US (2007)
- French Dressing (フレンチドレッシング), Japan (1998)
- French Twist (Gazon Maudit), France (1995)
- Fremde Haut (Unveiled), Germany/Austria (2005)
- Fresa y Chocolate (Strawberry and Chocolate), Cuba/Mexico/Spain (1994)
- Frida, Canada/Mexico/US (2002)
- Fried Green Tomatoes, US (1991)
- A Friend of Dorothy, US (1994)
- Friend of the World, US (2020)
- Friends & Family, US (2001)
- Friends Forever (Venner for altid), Denmark (1987)
- Frisk, US (1995)
- From Afar (Desde allá), Venezuela/Mexico (2015)
- From Beginning to End (Do Começo ao Fim), Brazil (2009)
- From the Edge of the City (Από την Ακρη της Πόλης), Greece (1998)
- From Zero to I Love You, US (2019)
- Front Cover (封面有男天), US (2015)
- A Frozen Flower (쌍화점), South Korea (2008)
- Fruit Fly, US (2009)
- The Fruit Machine, Wonderland, UK (1988)
- Fucking Åmål (Show Me Love), Sweden/Denmark (1998)
- Fuera de carta (Chef's Special), Spain (2008)
- Full Blast, Canada (1999)
- The Full Monty, UK (1997)
- Full Speed (À Toute Vitesse), France (1996)
- Fun Down There, US (1988)
- Funeral Parade of Roses (薔薇の葬列), Japan (1969)
- Funkytown, Canada (2011)
- Funny Story, US (2018)
- Further Off the Straight and Narrow, US (2006)
- Futuro Beach (Praia do Futuro), Brazil/Germany (2014)
- Futures (and Derivatives) (Futures & Derivatives), US (2007)
- Fyra år till (Four More Years), Sweden (2010)
- The Freedom to Marry, USA (2016)

== G ==
- G O'Clock, UK (2016)
- Gaming in Color, US (2014)
- The Garden, UK (1990)
- Garden (Gan), Israel/Canada (2003)
- Gates to Paradise, UK/Yugoslavia (1968)
- Gaudi Afternoon, Spain (2001)
- G.B.F., US (2013)
- Gay Days (הזמן הוורוד), Israel (2009)
- The Gay Deceivers, US (1969)
- The Gay Marriage Thing, US (2005)
- Gay Sex in the 70s, US (2005)
- Gay USA, US (1977)
- Gay Zombie, US (2007)
- Gayby, US (2012)
- Gayby Baby, Australia (2015)
- Gaydar, US (2002)
- Gayniggers from Outer Space, Denmark (1992)
- Gaze, US (2010)
- Gazon maudit (French Twist), France (1995)
- Gece, Melek ve Bizim Çocuklar (The Night, the Angel and Our Gang), Turkey (1994)
- The Gemini, Myanmar (2016)
- Gendernauts, US/Germany (1999)
- Geography Club, US (2013)
- Georgie Girl, New Zealand (2001)
- Gerontophilia, Canada (2013)
- Geschlecht in Fesseln – Die Sexualnot der Gefangenen (Sex in Chains), Germany (1928)
- Gesetze der Liebe (The Laws of Love), Germany (1927)
- Get a Life, US (2006)
- Get Real, UK (1998)
- Get Your Stuff, US (2000)
- Getting Go: The Go Doc Project, US (2013)
- Gewoon Vrienden (Just Friends), Netherlands (2018)
- Ghost Station (โกยเถอะเกย์), Thailand (2007)
- Gia, US (1998)
- Giant Little Ones, Canada (2018)
- Gigolo, Germany/Switzerland (2005)
- The Girl, US/France (2000)
- Girl, Boy, Bakla, Tomboy, Philippines (2013)
- The Girl Bunnies. Rocketship. (The Girl Bunnies), Canada (2015)
- The Girl Bunnies. Big Tree. (The Girl Bunnies), Canada (2011)
- The Girl Bunnies. Hockey. (The Girl Bunnies), Canada (2009)
- The Girl Bunnies (Les lapines), Canada (2008)
- Girl, Interrupted, US (1999)
- Girl King, Canada (2002)
- A Girl Like Me: The Gwen Araujo Story, US (2006)
- Girl Play, US (2004)
- Girl with Hyacinths (Flicka och hyacinter), Sweden (1950)
- Girlfriend, India (2004)
- Girls Can't Swim (Les filles ne savent pas nager), France (2000)
- Girls Will Be Girls, US (2003)
- Girltrash: All Night Long, US (2014)
- Give Me Your Hand (Donne-moi la main), France (2008)
- Glen or Glenda, US (1953)
- Gli occhiali d'oro (The Gold Rimmed Glasses), Italy/France/Yugoslavia (1987)
- Glowing Eyes (La chatte à deux têtes), France (2002)
- Glue, Argentina/UK (2006)
- Go, US (1999)
- Go Fish, US (1994)
- Go Go Crazy, US (2011)
- Go Go G-Boys (當我們同在一起), Taiwan (2007)
- Go Go Reject, US (2010)
- Go West, Bosnia-Herzegovina (2005)
- Gods and Monsters, US (1998)
- Gods of the Plague (Götter der Pest), West Germany (1970)
- God's Own Country, UK (2017)
- Gohatto (御法度), Taboo, Japan (1999)
- Going Down in LA-LA Land, US (2011)
- Going South (Plein sud), France (2009)
- The Gold Rimmed Glasses (Gli occhiali d'oro), Italy/France/Yugoslavia (1987)
- Gold, Canada (2005)
- Golden, Germany (2015)
- Golden Whore (Puta de oros), Spain (2000)
- Golden Eagle (อินทรีทอง), Thailand (1970)
- The Golden Pin, Canada (2009)
- The Goldfinch, US (2019)
- Goldfish Memory, Ireland (2003)
- Gone, But Not Forgotten, US (2003)
- Good Boys (ילדים טובים Yeladim Tovim), Israel (2005)
- Good Morning, Canada (2014)
- The Good Teacher (Pas de Vagues), France, Belgium (2024)
- Gosford Park, UK/US/Germany/Italy (2001)
- Gossip, Sweden (2000)
- Gotta Get Down to It, US (2019)
- Gouttes d'eau sur pierres brûlantes (Water Drops on Burning Rocks), France (2000)
- The Graffiti Artist, US (2004)
- Grande École, France (2004)
- Gray Matters, US (2006)
- Great Moments in Aviation, UK (1993)
- Greek Pete, UK (2009)
- The Green, US (2011)
- Green Plaid Shirt, US (1997)
- Grief, US (1993)
- The Grotesque, UK (1995)
- Groucho, Spain (2007)
- Group Therapy, US (2004)
- The Guest House, US (2012)
- Guidance, Canada (2014)
- Gulabi Aaina (The Pink Mirror), India (2003)
- Gun Hill Road, US (2011)
- Guyana Tragedy, US (1980)
- Guys and Balls (Männer wie wir), Germany (2004)
- The Gymnast, US (2006)
- Gypo, UK (2005)
- Gypsy 83, US (2001)
- Gypsy Boys, US (1999)

== H ==
- Hable con Ella (Talk to Her), Spain (2000)
- Hair, US/Germany (1979)
- Half a Life, Egypt/Indonesia/US/Netherlands (2017)
- Haltéroflic (Rainbow Serpent), France (1983)
- Hamam (Steam: The Turkish Bath), Italy/Turkey/Spain (1997)
- A Hard Blow (Le bon coup), France (2005)
- The Handmaiden (아가씨), South Korea (2016)
- Handsome Devil, Ireland (2016)
- Handsome Harry, US (2009)
- The Hanging Garden, UK/Canada (1997)
- Hangyaboly (Ant Colony), Hungary (1971)
- Hannah and Her Brothers (Hana a jej bratia), Slovakia (2000)
- Hannah Free, US (2009)
- Happiness Adjacent, US (2017)
- Happy & Gay, US (2014)
- Happy Endings, US (2005)
- Happy Endings Sleepover, US (2019)
- Happy-Go-Lucky, UK (2008)
- Happy Hearts, Philippines (2007)
- Happy, Texas, US (1999)
- Happy Together (春光乍泄), Hong Kong (1997)
- Hara Kiri, US (2016)
- Hard, US (1998)
- A Hard Blow (Le bon coup), France (2005)
- Hard Pill, US (2005)
- Harmonica's Howl, Brazil (2013)
- Harry + Max, US (2004)
- Harvest (Stadt Land Fluss), Germany (2011)
- Hate Crime, US (2005)
- The Haunting, UK (1963)
- Haunting Me (หอแต๋วแตก), Thailand (2007)
- Hawaii, Argentina (2013)
- Head in the Clouds, UK/Canada (2004)
- Head On, Australia (1998)
- Headlong (Corps perdu), Belgium (2012)
- Heart disease (Порок сердца Porok serdtsa), Russia (2014)
- Heartbeats (Les Amours imaginaires), Canada (2010)
- Hearts and Hotel Rooms, US (2007)
- Heavenly Creatures, UK/Germany/New Zealand (1994)
- Heavenly Touch, Philippines (2009)
- Hedwig and the Angry Inch, US (2001)
- Heiko, Portugal (2008)
- Heights, US (2004)
- Hein Maysara (حين ميسرة), Egypt (2008)
- Hellbent, US (2004)
- Hello My Love (헬로우마이러브), South Korea (2009)
- Henry & June, US (1990)
- Here's Looking at You, Boy (Schau mir in die Augen, Kleiner), Germany/Netherlands/Finland/Australia (2007)
- Hidden Away (A escondidas), Spain (2014)
- Hidden Hills, US (2013)
- Hidden Kisses (Baisers cachés), France (2016)
- Hidden Pleasures (Los placeres ocultos), Spain (1977)
- High Art, Canada/US (1998)
- High School Musical 2, US (2007)
- Him (Hann), Iceland (2018)
- His Secret Life (Le Fate Ignoranti), The Ignorant Fairies, Italy/France (2001)
- His Brother (Son frère), France (2003)
- His Wife's Diary (Дневник его жены; Dnevnik ego zheny), Russia (2000)
- The History Boys, UK (2006)
- The History of Sound, US/UK (2025)
- A History Without Importance (Une histoire sans importance), A Story of No Importance, France (1980)
- Hit and Run, US (2012)
- Hit and Runway, US (1999)
- Hold You Tight (愈快樂愈墮落), Hong Kong (1997)
- Hold Your Peace, US (2011)
- Holding the Man, Australia (2015)
- Holding Trevor, US (2007)
- Hole, Canada (2014)
- Holiday Heart, US (2000)
- Hollow Reed, UK/Germany/Spain (1996)
- Hollywood, je t'aime, US (2009)
- Hollywood Zap!, US (1986)
- Hombres de piel dura (Men of Hard Skin), Argentina (2019)
- A Home at the End of the World, US (2004)
- Home for the Holidays, US (1995)
- Home from the Gym, US (2014)
- Homewrecker, US (2009)
- Homme au bain (Man at Bath), France (2010)
- Hommes à louer (Men for Sale), Canada (2009)
- Homo Father, Poland (2005)
- The Homolulu Show, Norway (2004)
- Homotopia, US (2006)
- Hooks to the Left, US (2006)
- Hormoner og andre demoner, Norway (2003)
- Horror in the Wind, US (2008)
- Horror Vacui (Horror Vacui – Die Angst vor der Leere), Germany (1984)
- Hors les murs (Beyond the Walls), Belgium/Canada/France (2012)
- The Hotel New Hampshire, US/Canada/UK (1984)
- Hot Guys With Guns, US (2014)
- The Hours, US/UK (2002)
- The Hours and Times, US (1992)
- House of Boys, Germany/Luxembourg (2009)
- House of Himiko (メゾン・ド・ヒミコ), La Maison de Himiko, Japan (2005)
- The Houseboy, US (2007)
- How Do I Look, US (2006)
- How to Survive a Plague, US (2012)
- How to Win at Checkers (Every Time) (พี่ชาย My Hero), Thailand/US/Indonesia (2015)
- Howl, US (2010)
- Hu Die (蝴蝶; Butterfly), Hong Kong (2004)
- Huhwihaji anha (후회하지 않아), No Regret, South Korea (2006)
- Human Warmth (Chaleur humaine), Belgium (2013)
- Hung (short), US (2005)
- The Hunger, UK (1983)
- Hush! (ハッシュ!), Japan (2001)
- Hustler White, Canada (1996)

== I ==
- I Am Gay and Muslim, Netherlands/Morocco (2012)
- I Am Happiness on Earth (Yo soy la felicidad de este mundo), Mexico (2014)
- I Am Michael, US (2015)
- I Am My Own Woman (Ich bin meine eigene Frau), Germany (1992)
- I Am Not What You Want (天使), Hong Kong (2001)
- I Am Syd Stone, Canada (2014)
- I Can't Think Straight, UK/India (2007)
- I Care a Lot, US (2020)
- I Do, US (2012)
- I Don't Care, UK (2010)
- I Don't Kiss (J'embrasse pas), France (1991)
- I Don't Want to Go Back Alone (Eu não quero voltar sozinho), Brazil (2010)
- I Don't Want to Sleep Alone (黑眼圈), Malaysia/China/Taiwan/France/Austria (2006)
- I Dreamt under the Water (J'ai rêvé sous l'eau), France (2008)
- I Killed My Mother (J'ai tué ma mère), Canada (2009)
- I Like It Like That (1994) US
- I Like You, I Like You Very Much (あなたが好きです、大好きです), Japan (1994)
- I Love Hooligans, Netherlands/Belgium (2013)
- I Love You Baby, Spain (2001)
- I Love You, I Don't (Je t'aime moi non-plus), France (1976)
- I Love You Phillip Morris, US/France (2009)
- I Now Pronounce You Chuck and Larry, US (2007)
- I Saw the TV Glow, US (2024)
- I Shot Andy Warhol, UK/US (1996)
- I Shot My Love, Israel/Germany (2010)
- I, the Worst of All (Yo, la peor de todas), Argentina (1990)
- I Think I Do, US (1997)
- I Wanna Be a Republican, US (2006)
- I Want to Get Married, US (2011)
- I Want Your Love, US (2010, 2012)
- I Will Survive (Sobreviviré), Spain (1999)
- I Wish You All the Best, US (2024)
- Ice Blues, Canada (2008)
- Ice Men, Canada (2004)
- if...., UK (1968)
- If These Walls Could Talk 2, US (2000)
- The Ignorant Fairies (Le Fate ignoranti), His Secret Life, Italy/France (2001)
- Il compleanno (David's Birthday), Italy (2009)
- Il sapore del grano (The Flavor of Corn), Italy (1986)
- Il Vento e le Rose (愛するということ; The Awakening of Love), Japan/Italy (2009)
- I'll Love You Forever... Tonight, US (1992)
- I'm the One That I Want, US (2000)
- I'm So Excited! (Los amantes pasajeros), Spain (2013)
- Imaginary Heroes, US (2004)
- Imagine Me & You, UK (2005)
- The Imitation Game, UK (2014)
- Immacolata and Concetta: The Other Jealousy (Immacolata e Concetta), Italy (1980)
- In & Out, US (1997)
- In a Glass Cage (Tras el cristal), Spain (1986)
- In a Year of 13 Moons (In einem Jahr mit 13 Monden), West Germany (1978)
- In Between, Israel (2016)
- In Bloom, US (2013)
- In my end is my beginning, South Korea (2009)
- In einem Moment, Germany (2019)
- In Extremis (To the Extreme), France (2000)
- In from the Side, UK (2002)
- In Her Line of Fire, US (2005)
- In My Life, Philippines (2009)
- In the Blood, US (2006)
- In The Closet, US (2008)
- In the Family, US (2011)
- In the Flesh, US (1998)
- In the Gloaming, US (1997)
- In the Grayscale (En la Gama de los Grises), Chile (2015)
- In the Name of... (W imię...), Poland (2013)
- In the Realm of the Senses (愛のコリーダ; L'Empire des sens), Japan/France (1976)
- The Incredibly True Adventure of Two Girls in Love, US (1995)
- Indian Summer (Alive & Kicking), UK (1996)
- Indifference (Likegyldighet), Norway (2000)
- Infamous, US (2006)
- Inflatble Swamp, UK (2010)
- Innocent (只爱陌生人), Canada/Hong Kong (2005)
- The Innocents (Los inocentes), Mexico/Peru (2025)
- Intentions, US (2002)
- Interior. Leather Bar., US (2013)
- Interview with the Vampire, US (1994)
- Interviews with My Next Girlfriend, Canada (short, 2002)
- An Intimate Friendship, US (2000)
- Intimates (自梳; Ji Sor), Hong Kong (1997)
- Into the Night, Australia (2002)
- The Iron Ladies (สตรีเหล็ก), Thailand (2000)
- The Iron Ladies 2 (สตรีเหล็ก 2), Thailand (2003)
- Is It Just Me?, US (2010)
- Isha, UK (2018)
- Iskandariyah... lih? (Alexandria... Why?) (إسكندرية... ليه؟), Egypt (1978)
- The Island, Canada (2009)
- Island of Death, Greece (1976)
- Issues 101, US (2002)
- It Is Not the Homosexual Who Is Perverse, But the Society in Which He Lives (Nicht der Homosexuelle ist pervers, sondern die Situation, in der er lebt), West Germany (1971)
- It's Consuming Me, Germany (2012)
- It's in the Water, US (1997)
- It's My Party, US (1996)
- It's Not a Cowboy Movie (Ce n'est pas un film de cow-boys), France (2012)
- It's Pat, US (1994)
- Itty Bitty Titty Committee, US (2007)
- I've Heard the Mermaids Singing, Canada (1987)
- Izlet (A Trip), Slovenia (2011)

== J ==
- J. Edgar, US (2011)
- Jack, US (2004)
- Jack & Diane, US (2012)
- Jackson: My Life... Your Fault, UK (1995)
- J'ai rêvé sous l'eau (I Dreamt under the Water), France (2008)
- Jailbait, US (2004)
- James, UK (2008)
- Jamie, UK (2016)
- Jan Dara (จัน ดารา), Thailand (2001)
- Janji Diana (Diana's Promise), Malaysia (2004)
- Japan Japan (יפאן יפאן), Israel (2007)
- Jay, Philippines (2008)
- Je t'aime moi non-plus (I Love You, I Don't), France (1976)
- Je te mangerais (You Will Be Mine; Highly Strung), France (2009)
- Je, Tu, Il, Elle (I, You, He, She), France/Belgium (1974)
- Je vois déjà le titre, France (2005)
- Jeffrey, US (1995)
- J'embrasse pas (I Don't Kiss), France (1991)
- J'en suis! (Heads or Tails), Canada (1997)
- Jennifer's Body, US (2009)
- Jerker, US (1991)
- Jermaine and Elsie (Jermaine & Elsie), UK (2018)
- Jerusalem Is Proud to Present (ירושלים גאה להציג), Israel (2008)
- Jesús, Chile/France/Germany/Greece (2016)
- JFK, US (1991)
- Ji Sor (自梳; Intimates), Hong Kong (1997)
- Jitters (Órói), Iceland (2010)
- Joe + Belle (ג'ו + בל), Israel (2011)
- Johan, France (1976)
- John Apple Jack, Canada (2013)
- John and Michael, Canada (2004)
- Johnny Guitar, US (1954)
- johns, US (1996)
- Jolly Fellows (Весельчаки), Russia (2009)
- The Joneses, US (2009)
- The Journey (സഞ്ചാരം), India (2004)
- The Journey of Jared Price, US (2000)
- Jongens (Boys), Netherlands (2014)
- Joyland, Pakistan (2022)
- The Joy of Life, US (2005)
- Julie Johnson, US (2001)
- Judas Kiss, US (2011)
- Just a Question of Love (Juste une question d'amour), France/Belgium (2000)
- Just Another Love Story (আরেকটি প্রেমের গল্প; Arekti Premer Golpo), India (2010)
- Just Charlie, UK (2017)
- Just Friends (Gewoon Vrienden), Netherlands (2018)
- Just Friends? (친구사이?), South Korea (2009)
- Just Like a Woman, UK (1992)
- Just Me, UK (2018)
- Just One Time, US (1998)
- Just One Time, US (1999)
- Just Say Love, US (2009)
- Just the Two of Us (The Dark Side of Tomorrow), US (1970)

== K ==
- Kaboom, US/France (2010)
- Kajillionaire, US (2020)
- Kakera: A Piece of Our Life (カケラ), Japan (2010)
- Kaleldo (Summer Heat), Philippines (2006)
- Kali Ma, US/India (2007)
- Kambyo, Philippines (2008)
- Kanarie, South Africa (2018)
- Kansas City Trucking Co., US (1976)
- Kantutin sa Pwet, Philippines (2017)
- Kasal, Philippines (2014)
- Kawa, New Zealand (2010)
- Kdo se boji Jerryja Springerja (Who's Afraid of Jerry Springer), Slovenia (2004)
- Keep Not Silent (את שאהבה נפשי), Israel (2004)
- Keep the Lights On, US (2012)
- Keiko, Japan (1979)
- Keillers Park, Sweden (2006)
- Keller – Teenage Wasteland (Out of Hand), Germany/Austria/Italy (2005)
- Kicking and Screaming, US (1995)
- KickOff, UK (2011)
- The Kids Are All Right, US (2010)
- Kids in America, US (2005)
- Kiki, Sweden, US (2016)
- Kill for Me, US (2013)
- Kill Your Darlings, US (2013)
- Killer Condom (Kondom des Grauens), Germany (1996)
- Killer Drag Queens on Dope, US (2003)
- Putang ina mo kang bakla ka (Hermie), Sweden (2011)
- The Killing of Sister George, UK (1968)
- Kinds of Kindness, UK/US (2024)
- King and the Clown (왕의 남자), South Korea (2005)
- King Cobra, US (2016)
- King Size, France (2007)
- Kinky Boots, UK/US (2005)
- Kinsey, US (2004)
- Kira kira hikaru (きらきらひかる), Japan (1992)
- Kiss, US (1963)
- Kiss Kiss Bang Bang, US (2005)
- Kiss Me Again, US (2006)
- Kiss Me Deadly, US (2008)
- Kiss Me, Guido, US (1997)
- Kiss Me, Kill Me, US (2015)
- Kiss Me Softly (Kus me zachtjes), Belgium (2012)
- Kiss of the Spider Woman, US (1985)
- Kiss the Bride, US (2008)
- Kissing Darkness, US (2013)
- Kissing Drew, Canada (2013)
- Kissing Jessica Stein, US (2001)
- Kissing Tigers (Embrasser les tigres), France (2004)
- The Kite (Dragen), Denmark/Singapore (2016)
- Kleine Freiheit (A Little Bit of Freedom), Germany (2003)
- Km. 0, Spain (2000)
- Kommt Mausi raus?! (Is Mausi Coming Out?), Germany (1995)
- Krámpack (Nico and Dani), Spain (2000)
- Kung Fu Tootsie (ตั๊ดสู้ฟุด), Thailand (2007)
- Kyss mig (Kiss Me), Sweden (2011)

== L ==
- La bocca del lupo (The Mouth of the Wolf), Italy (2009)
- La Cage aux Folles (Birds of a Feather), France (1978)
- La Cage aux Folles II, France (1980)
- La Cage aux Folles 3: The Wedding (La cage aux folles 3 – 'Elles' se marient), France (1985)
- La chatte à deux têtes (Glowing Eyes), France (2002)
- La Confusion des Genres (Confusion of Genders), France (2000)
- La famille selon Mathieu, France (2002)
- La fin de la nuit, France (1997)
- La Garçonne, France (1936)
- La León, Argentina/France (2007)
- La Luciérnaga (The Firefly), Colombia/US (2013)
- La ley del deseo (Law of Desire), Spain (1987)
- La Maison de Himiko (メゾン・ド・ヒミコ), House of Himiko, Japan (2005)
- La Mala educación (Bad Education), Spain (2004)
- La meilleure façon de marcher (The Best Way to Walk), France (1976)
- La Mission, US (2010)
- La Muerte de Mikel (The Death of Mikel), Spain (1984)
- La otra familia (The Other Family), Mexico (2011)
- La Partida (The Last Match), Spain/Cuba (2013)
- La primavera de los escorpiones, Mexico (1970)
- La Surprise, France (2007)
- La tête froide, France (2012)
- La Vie d'Adèle (Blue Is the Warmest Colour), France (2013)
- La vie des autres, France (2000)
- La Ville dont le prince est un enfant (The Fire That Burns), France (1997)
- La virgen de los sicarios (Our Lady of the Assassins), Spain/France/Colombia (2000)
- L'abandon, Belgium (1996)
- Labyrinth of Passion (Laberinto de pasiones), Spain (1982)
- The Lady Assassin (Mỹ Nhân Kế), Vietnam (2013)
- Lady Bird, US (2017)
- Lady Daddy (아빠가 여자를 좋아해), Korea (2010)
- The Lady in Question Is Charles Busch, US (2005)
- Lady Peacock, US (2014)
- Lakki... The Boy Who Could Fly (Lakki), Norway (1992)
- Lan Yu (蓝宇), Hong Kong/China (2001)
- Land of Storms (Viharsarok), Hungary (2014)
- The Language of Love, Australia (2013)
- Lapsia ja aikuisia – Kuinka niitä tehdään? (Producing Adults), Finland/Sweden (2004)
- The Laramie Project, US (2002)
- L'Arbre et la forêt (Family Tree), France (2010)
- Laruang Lalaki (Toy Boy), Philippines (2010)
- Last Call, US (2009)
- Last Call at Maud's, US (1993)
- Last Chance (Une derniere chance), Canada (2012)
- Last Days, US (2005)
- A Last Farewell (Ett sista farväl), Sweden (2013)
- Last Friends (ラスト·フレンズ), Japan (2008)
- Last Full Show (Asian Queer Shorts), Philippines (2005)
- Last Exit to Brooklyn, US/UK/West Germany (1989)
- The Last Match (La Partida), Spain/Cuba (2013)
- Last Summer, US (2013)
- The Last Summer of La Boyita (El último verano de la Boyita), Argentina (2009)
- The Last Supper, Canada (1994)
- The Last Time I Saw Richard, Australia (2014)
- The Last Year, US (2002)
- Latin Boys Go to Hell, US (1997)
- Latter Days, US (2003)
- L'Auberge Espagnole (Pot Luck; The Spanish Apartment), France/Spain (2002)
- Laurence Anyways, Canada (2012)
- Lavender, US (2019)
- Law of Desire (La ley del deseo), Spain (1987)
- Lawrence of Arabia, UK (1962)
- Le Clan (3 Dancing Slaves), France (2004)
- Le Fate ignoranti (The Ignorant Fairies; His Secret Life), Italy/France (2001)
- Le Fil (The String), France/Belgium/Tunisia (2009)
- Le Hasard fait bien les choses (As Luck Would Have It), Switzerland (2002)
- Le Placard (The Closet), France (2001)
- Le planeur, Belgium (1999)
- Le Temps Qui Reste (Time to Leave), France (2005)
- Le Voyage en douce, France (1980)
- Le Weekend, UK (2007)
- Leading Ladies, US (2010)
- Leather, US (2013)
- The Leather Boys, UK (1964)
- Leather Jacket Love Story, US (1997)
- Leave It on the Floor, Canada/US (2011)
- Leave Me Alone (阿孖有難), Hong Kong (2004)
- Leaving Metropolis, Canada (2002)
- The Legend of Rita (Die Stille nach dem Schuß), Germany (2000)
- L'Empire des sens (愛のコリーダ; In the Realm of the Senses), Japan/France (1976)
- Les Adieux à la reine (Farewell, My Queen), France (2012)
- Les amitiés particulières (This Special Friendship), France (1964)
- Les Biches (The Does), France/Italy (1968)
- Les lapines (The Girl Bunnies), Canada (2008)
- Les Chansons d'amour (Love Songs), France (2007)
- Les filles du botaniste (植物园; The Chinese Botanist's Daughters), France/Canada (2006)
- Les Nuits fauves (Savage Nights), France/Italy/UK (1992)
- Les Puceaux, France (1996)
- Les Poupées russes (The Russian Dolls), France/UK (2005)
- Les Témoins (The Witnesses), France (2007)
- Les Voleurs (Thieves), France (1996)
- Lesbian Space Princess, Australia (2024)
- Lesbian Vampire Killers, UK (2009)
- Let My People Go!, France (2011)
- Let's Go to Prison, US (2006)
- Leviticus, Australia (2026)
- L'Homme blessé (The Wounded Man), France (1983)
- L'Homme de sa vie (The Man of My Life), France/Italy (2006)
- L'Homme Jetée, Switzerland/France (2019)
- Lianna, US (1983)
- Liberace: Behind the Music, US/Canada (1988)
- Liberated, Philippines (2003)
- Liberated 2, Philippines (2004)
- Licensed to Kill, US (1997)
- L.I.E., US (2001)
- Lie Down With Dogs, US (1995)
- Light Gradient (Rückenwind), Germany (2009)
- Like a Brother (Comme un frère), France (2005)
- Like a Virgin (천하장사 마돈나), South Korea (2006)
- Like Grains of Sand (渚のシンドバッド), Japan (1995)
- Like It Is, UK (1998)
- Lilies, Canada (1996)
- Lilting, UK (2014)
- Lily Festival (百合祭), Japan (2001)
- L'Inconnu du lac (Stranger by the Lake), France (2013)
- Lisístrata, Spain (2002)
- Listen, US (1996)
- Listen, Australia (2019)
- Little Ashes, UK/Spain (2008)
- Little Boy Blue, US (1997)
- Little Gay Boy, France (2013)
- Little Gay Boy, chrisT is Dead, France (2012)
- Little Man, UK/Israel (2012)
- Little Man (Petit homme), Switzerland/France (2014)
- Little Miss Sunshine, US (2006)
- Live Nude Girls, US (1995)
- Live Show (Toro), Philippines (2000)
- The Living End, US (1992)
- Liz in September, Venezuela (2013)
- Liza Minnelli Reflecting (documentary), US, (2005)
- Lizzie, US, (2018)
- Locked Up (Gefangen), Germany (2004)
- Locos de amor: mi primer amor, Peru (2025)
- Loev, India (2015)
- Loggerheads, US (2005)
- Lola and Billy the Kid (Lola und Bilidikid), Germany (1999)
- The Lollipop Generation, Canada (2008)
- Lonely 15, Norway (2004)
- Lonesome Cowboys, US (1968)
- The Long Good Friday, UK (1980)
- The Long Weekend (O' Despair), US (1989)
- The Longest Yard, US (2005)
- Longing (Saudade – Sehnsucht), Germany (2003)
- Longhorns, US (2011)
- Long-Term relationship, US (2006)
- Longtime Companion, US (1990)
- Looking for Cheyenne (Oublier Cheyenne), France (2005)
- Looking for Langston, UK (1989)
- Loose Cannons (Mine vaganti), Italy (2010)
- Los amantes pasajeros (I'm So Excited!), Spain (2013)
- Los Novios búlgaros (Bulgarian Lovers), Spain (2003)
- Lose Your Head, Germany (2013)
- Losing Chase, US (1996)
- Lost and Delirious, Canada (2001)
- Lost Everything, US (2010)
- Lost in Paradise (Hot boy nổi loạn, hay Câu chuyện về thằng Cười, cô gái điếm và con vịt), Vietnam (2011)
- Lost in the Pershing Point Hotel, US (2000)
- The Lost Language of Cranes, UK (1991)
- Lot in Sodom, US (1933)
- Love (My Name Is Love), Sweden (2008)
- LOVE, 100 °C (사랑은 100도씨), South Korea (2010)
- Love Actually... Sucks! (愛很爛), Hong Kong/China (2011)
- Love and Deaf, US (2004)
- Love and Death on Long Island, UK/Canada (1997)
- Love and Human Remains, Canada (1993)
- Love and Other Catastrophes, Australia (1996)
- Love and Other Disasters, France/United Kingdom (2006)
- Love and Suicide, US (2006)
- Love Bite, Australia (2008)
- Love Exposure (愛のむきだし), Japan (2008)
- Love, In Between (두여자), Korea (2010)
- Love in Thoughts (Was nützt die Liebe in Gedanken), Germany (2005)
- Love in the Big City (대도시의 사랑법), South Korea (2024)
- Love Is All You Need, Denmark (2012)
- Love Is All You Need?, US (2010)
- Love Is All You Need?, US (2016)
- Love Is the Devil: Study for a Portrait of Francis Bacon, UK/France/Japan (1998)
- Love Is Strange, US/France (2014)
- Love/Juice, Japan (2000)
- Love Lies Bleeding, UK/US (2024)
- Love Life, US (2006)
- Love Me, If You Can (飛躍情海), Taiwan (2003)
- Love My Life (ラブ・マイ・ライフ), Japan (2006)
- Love of a Man (Amor de hombre), Spain (1997)
- The Love of Siam (รักแห่งสยาม), Thailand (2006)
- Love on the Side, US/Canada (2004)
- Love or Whatever, US (2012)
- The Love Patient, US (2011)
- Love Sick (Legături bolnăvicioase), Romania/France (2006)
- Love, Simon, US (2018)
- Lovesong, US (2016)
- Love Songs (Les Chansons d'amour), France (2007)
- A Love to Hide (Un amour à taire), France (2005)
- Love! Valour! Compassion!, US (1997)
- Lovebirds, Philippines (2008)
- Lovers' Kiss (ラヴァーズ・キス), Japan (2003)
- Lovers Vanished (폭풍전야), Korea (2010)
- Loving Annabelle, US (2006)
- A Low Down Dirty Shame, US (1994)
- Luca, US (2021)
- Lucky Bastard, US (2009)
- Lucky Blue, Sweden (2007)
- Ludwig, France/Italy/West Germany (1972)
- Luna Park, US (2012)
- L'un dans l'autre, France (1999)
- Lust for a Vampire, UK/US (1971)
- Luster, US (2002)

== M ==
- M. Butterfly, US (1993)
- Ma vie en rose (My Life in Pink), France/Belgium/UK (1997)
- Ma vraie vie à Rouen (My Life on Ice), France (2002)
- Maacher Jhol (The fish curry), India (2017)
- Macho Dancer, Philippines (1988)
- Madagascar Skin, UK (1995)
- Madalena, Brazil (2021)
- Madame Satã, Brazil/France (2002)
- Mädchen in Uniform, Germany (1931)
- Mädchen in Uniform, Germany (1958)
- Mad Max 2, Australia (1981)
- Maestro, United States (2003)
- Mahal Kita 1941 (Aishite Imasu 1941), I Love You 1941, Philippines (2004)
- Mahogany (film), US (1975)
- Majorettes in Space (Des majorettes dans l'espace), France (1997)
- Make the Yuletide Gay, US (2009)
- Making Love, US (1982)
- Mala Noche (Bad Night), US (1985)
- The Maltese Falcon, US (1931)
- The Maltese Falcon, US (1941)
- Mambo Italiano, Canada (2003)
- A Man, a Real One (Un homme, un vrai), France (2003)
- Man and Boy, UK (2010)
- Man at Bath (Homme au bain), France (2010)
- Martyr (Shaheed), Lebanon (2017)
- Mind Mera Mind, India (2021)
- The Man I Love (L'homme que j'aime), France (1997)
- The Man in Her Life (Ang Lalaki sa Buhay ni Selya), The Man in Selya's Life, Philippines (1997)
- The Man in the Lighthouse (Ang Lalake sa Parola), Philippines (2007)
- Man Is a Woman (L'homme est une femme comme les autres), France (1998)
- The Man Next Door (Ο άνδρας της διπλανής πόρτας... O andras tis diplanis portas...), Greece (2001)
- The Man of My Life (L'Homme de sa vie), France/Italy (2006)
- A Man of No Importance, UK/Ireland (1994)
- Man of the Year, US (1995)
- The Man Who Loved Yngve (Mannen som elsket Yngve), Norway (2008)
- The Man with the Answers (Ο άνθρωπος με τις απαντήσεις), Cyprus/Greece/Italy (2021)
- Manay Po, Philippines (2006)
- Manay Po 2: Overload, Philippines (2008)
- Mandragora, Czech Republic (1997)
- Mango Soufflé, India (2002)
- Mango Kiss, US (2004)
- Mangus!, US (2011)
- Manji (卍), Japan (1964)
- Mannequin, US (1987)
- Mannequin Two: On the Move, US (1991)
- Männer wie wir (Guys and Balls), Germany (2004)
- Männer zum knutschen (Men to Kiss), Germany (2012)
- Manivald, Estonia/Croatia/Canada (2017)
- Mankind, UK (2019)
- Mano Destra, Switzerland (1986)
- Manuela and Manuel (Manuela y Manuel), Puerto Rico (2007)
- Maple Palm, US (2006)
- The Map of Sex and Love (情色地圖), Hong Kong (2001)
- Mapplethorpe, US (2018)
- Marble Ass (Дупе од мрамора; Dupe od mramora), Serbia (1995)
- Margarita, Canada (2012)
- Mariko Rose the Spook (おばけのマリコローズ; Obake no Mariko Rōzu), Japan (2009)
- Mario, Switzerland (2018)
- Markova: Comfort Gay, Philippines (2000)
- Marry My Dead Body, (關於我和鬼變成家人的那件事), Taiwan (2022)
- The Mars Canon (火星のカノン), Japan (2002)
- Martyrs, France/Canada (2008)
- Masahista (The Masseur), Philippines (2005)
- Mascarpone (Maschile singolare), Italy (2021)
- Mascarpone: The Rainbow Cake (Maschile plurale), Italy (2024)
- Matrimonium, US (2005)
- The Matthew Shepard Story, US (2002)
- Maurice, UK (1987)
- Mauvaise conduite (Improper Conduct), France (1984)
- May, US (2002)
- Maybe, Maybe Not (Der bewegte Mann), Germany (1994)
- Maybe Tomorrow (Baka Bukas), Philippines (2016)
- Me ... Myself (ขอให้รักจงเจริญ), Thailand (2007)
- Mean Girls, US (2004)
- Meatoo, UK (2018)
- Meet the Spartans, US (2008)
- Meghdhanushya, India (2013)
- Melting Away (נמס בגשם), Israel (2012)
- Memento Mori (여고괴담2), South Korea (1999)
- Memoirs of a Geeza, UK (2019)
- Men and Women (男男女女), China (1999)
- Men for Sale (Hommes à louer), Canada (2009)
- Men, Heroes and Gay Nazis (Männer, Helden, schwule Nazis), Germany (2005)
- Men in the Nude (Férfiakt), Hungary (2006)
- The Men Next Door, US (2012)
- Men Not Allowed, India (2005)
- Men of Provoq (voyouer), Philippines (2006)
- Men to Kiss (Männer zum knutschen), Germany (2012)
- Ménage (Tenue de soirée), France (1986)
- Merci Docteur Rey, France/US (2002)
- Mercy, US (2000)
- Merry Christmas, Mr. Lawrence (戦場のメリークリスマス), UK/Japan (1983)
- Mery per sempre ("Forever Mary"), Italy (1989)
- Mes chers parents, France (2005)
- Method (메소드), South Korea (2017)
- Metrosexual (แก๊งชะนีกับอีแอบ), Thailand (2006)
- Metrosexuality, UK (2001)
- Mi último round (My Last Round), Chile/Argentina (2011)
- Miao Miao (渺渺), Hong Kong/Taiwan (2008)
- Michael (Mikaël), Germany (1924)
- Michael Joseph Jason John, UK (2018)
- Middle Man, UK (2014)
- Midnight Cabaret, US (2012)
- Midnight Cowboy, US (1969)
- Midnight Dancers (Sibak), Philippines (1994)
- Midnight Express, US (1978)
- Midnight in the Garden of Good and Evil, US (1997)
- Mielőtt befejezi röptét a denevér (Before the Bat's Flight Is Done), Hungary (1989)
- Miguel/Michelle, Philippines (1998)
- Milk, US (2008)
- Miller's Crossing, US (1990)
- Mine, UK (2017)
- Mirror Mirror, Australia (2008)
- Mirrors (Miroirs d'été), Canada (2006)
- Mirrors, UK (2015)
- Misconceptions, US (2008)
- The Miseducation of Cameron Post, UK/US (2018)
- Miss Congeniality 2: Armed and Fabulous, US (2005)
- Mixed Kebab, Belgium/Turkey (2012)
- The M.O. of M.I., US (2002)
- Moffie, South Africa/UK (2019)
- The Monkey's Mask, Australia/Canada/France/Italy/Japan (2000)
- Monsoon, UK (2019)
- Monster, US (2003)
- Monster Pies, Australia (2013)
- Montana, Israel (2017)
- Moonlight, US (2016)
- More Scenes from a Gay Marriage, US (2014)
- More Than Only, US (2017)
- Moreno (Bronze), Philippines (2007)
- Morgan, US (2012)
- Mors lille Ole, Norway (2003)
- Morte a Venezia (Death in Venice), Italy/France (1971)
- Mosquita y Mari, US (2012)
- The Mostly Unfabulous Social Life of Ethan Green, US (2005)
- Mother Knows Best (Mamma vet bäst), Sweden (2016)
- The Mouth of the Wolf (La bocca del lupo), Italy (2009)
- Mr. Magorium's Wonder Emporium, US/Canada (2007)
- Mr. Right, UK (2009)
- Mr. Sugar Daddy, Sweden (2016)
- The Mudge Boy, US (2003)
- The Muleteer (La arriera), Mexico (2024)
- Mulholland Drive, US (2001)
- Muli (The Affair), Philippines (2010)
- Mull, Australia (1988)
- Mulligans, Canada (2008)
- Mumbai Police, India(2013)
- The Music Lovers, UK (1970)
- Mute, UK/Germany (2018)
- My 13 (13 ans), France (2008)
- My Beautiful Laundrette, UK (1985)
- My Best Friend's Wedding, US (1997)
- My Brother...Nikhil, India (2005)
- My Brother the Devil, UK (2012)
- My Brother's War, US (2005)
- My Dad Works the Night Shift (Mon père travaille de nuit), Canada (2018)
- My Dearest Senorita (Mi querida señorita), Spain (1972)
- My Fair Son (我如花似玉的儿子), China (2005)
- My Friend from Faro (Mein Freund aus Faro), Germany (2008)
- My Friend Rachid (Mon copain Rachid), France (1998)
- My Girlfriend's Boyfriend, US (1998)
- My Hustler, US (1965)
- My Last Round (Mi último round), Chile/Argentina (2011)
- My Last Ten Hours with You, Australia (2007)
- My Life in Pink (Ma vie en rose), France/Belgium/UK (1997)
- My Mother Likes Women (A mi madre le gustan las mujeres), Spain (2002)
- My Name Is Love (Love), Sweden (2008)
- My Night with Reg, UK (1996)
- My Own Private Idaho, US (1991)
- My Policeman, US (2022)
- My Prairie Home, Canada (2013)
- My Summer of Love, UK (2004)
- My Sweet Prince, UK (2019)
- Myra Breckinridge, US (1970)
- The Mysteries of Pittsburgh, US (2009)
- Mysterious Skin, US/Netherlands (2004)

== N ==
- Nachbarinnen (Wanted!), Germany (2004)
- Naissance des Pieuvres (Water Lilies), France (2007)
- Naked Boys Singing!, US (2007)
- The Naked Civil Servant, UK (1975)
- Naked Killer (赤裸羔羊), Hong Kong (1992)
- Naked Lunch, Canada/UK/Japan (1991)
- När alla vet (Sebastian), Norway/Sweden (1995)
- Nate and Margaret, US (2012)
- Natural Woman (ナチュラル・ウーマン), Japan (1994)
- The Nature of Nicholas, Canada (2002)
- Navarasa (நவரசா), India (2005)
- Nés en 68 (Born in 68), France (2008)
- Never Met Picasso, US (1996)
- The New Tenants, Denmark/US (2009)
- Newcastle, Australia (2008)
- The Next Best Thing, US (2000)
- Next Stop, Greenwich Village, US (1976)
- Next Year in Jerusalem, US (1997)
- Nico and Dani (Krámpack), Spain (2000)
- A Night at Switch n' Play US (2019)
- Night Flight (야간비행), South Korea (2014)
- The Night Larry Kramer Kissed Me, US (2000)
- The Night Listener, US (2006)
- The Night of the Iguana, US/Mexico (1964)
- Night Out, Australia (1989)
- The Night Porter, Italy (1974)
- Night Scene (夜景), China (2003)
- Night Swimming, US (2005)
- Nighthawks, UK (1978)
- Nights in Black Leather, US (1973)
- Nightstand, UK (2015)
- Nightswimming, UK (2010)
- Nijinsky, US (1980)
- Nil Nirjane (নীল নির্জনে; Vacation Blues), India (2003)
- Nimona, US, UK (2023)
- Nina's Heavenly Delights, UK (2006)
- Nitrate Kisses, US (1992)
- No Fags (Tunten zwecklos), Germany (2021)
- No More We (Vi finns inte längre), Sweden (2018)
- No Night Is Too Long, UK/Canada (2002)
- No One Sleeps, Germany (2000)
- No Ordinary Love, US (1994)
- No se lo digas a nadie (Don't Tell Anyone), Peru/Spain (1998)
- No Skin Off My Ass, Canada (1991)
- No Regret (후회하지 않아), South Korea (2006)
- No Way Out (Walang Kawala), Philippines (2008)
- Noah's Arc: Jumping The Broom, US (2008)
- Noah's Arc: The Short Film, US (2004)
- Nocturnal Animals, US (2016)
- Nonsense Revolution, Canada (2008)
- North Sea Texas (Noordzee, Texas), Belgium (2011)
- Norma Jean & Marilyn, US/UK (1996)
- Normal, US (2003)
- A Normal Guy (Un baiat normal), Romania (2019)
- The Normal Heart, US (2014)
- Norman... Is That You?, US (1976)
- North Mountain, Canada (2015)
- Not Love, Just Frenzy (Más que amor, frenesí), Spain (1996)
- Notes on a Scandal, UK (2006)
- Notorious C.H.O., US (2002)
- Notre Paradis (Our Paradise), France (2011)
- November Moon (Novembermond), Germany (1985)
- November Sun, US (2007)
- Nowhere, US (1997)
- Nuovo Olimpo, Italy (2023)
- Nyad, US (2023)
- Nymphomaniac, Denmark (2013)

== O ==
- O Beautiful, US (2002)
- Oberst Redl (Colonel Redl), Hungary/Austria/West Germany (1985)
- The Object of My Affection, US (1998)
- An Obsolete Altar, India (2013)
- October Moon, US (2005)
- Odd Sock, Ireland (2000)
- Ode to Billy Joe, US (1976)
- Odete, Portugal (2006)
- Oedipus N+1 (ŒDIPE -(n+1)), France (2003)
- O Fantasma (The Phantom), Portugal (2000)
- Off Shore, Germany (2011)
- Oh Happy Day, UK (2007)
- Okoge (おこげ), Japan (1992)
- Oi! Warning, Germany (1999)
- The Old Dark House, US (1932)
- Old Joy, US (2007)
- The Old Testament (旧约), China (2001)
- Olivia (The Pit of Loneliness), France (1951)
- On the Downlow, US (2004)
- On the Other Hand, Death, Canada/US (2008)
- On the Road, Brazil/France/UK/US (2012)
- On Swift Horses, US (2024)
- Once in a Lifetime (Livet är en schlager), Sweden (2000)
- The One, US (2011)
- One Fine Day, a Hairdresser (Un beau jour, un coiffeur), France (2004)
- One Night Stand, US (1997)
- One Life to Blossom, US (2021 )
- One Summer Night (어느 여름날 밤에), South Korea (2016)
- One to Another (Chacun sa nuit), France/Denmark (2006)
- Open, US (2011)
- Open Cam, US (2005)
- Open Fire, UK (1994)
- The Opposite of Sex, US (1998)
- Oranges, Australia/US (2004)
- Oranges Are Not the Only Fruit, UK (1990)
- Orchids, My Intersex Adventure, Australia (2010)
- Ordinary Sinner, US (2001)
- Orlando, UK (1993)
- Oscar Wilde, UK (1960)
- Other Voices, Other Rooms, US/UK (1995)
- Otra Historia de Amor (Another Love Story), Argentina (1986)
- Otra película de amor (Another Movie of Love), Chile (2010)
- Otto; or Up with Dead People, Canada/Germany (2008)
- Oublier Cheyenne (Looking for Cheyenne), France (2005)
- Our Lady of the Assassins (La virgen de los sicarios), Colombia/Spain/France (2000)
- Our Love Story (연애담; Yeon-ae-dam), South Korea (2016)
- Our Sons, US (1991)
- Out at the Wedding, US (2007)
- Out in the Dark (עלטה), Israel (2012)
- Out in the Open, US (2012)
- Out in the Silence, US (2009)
- Out of Hand (Keller – Teenage Wasteland), Germany/Austria/Italy (2005)
- Out of Season, US (1998)
- Out of the Past, US (1998)
- Out to Kill, US (2014)
- Out West, US (2013)
- Outcasts (孽子, Nièzǐ), Taiwan (1986)
- Outing Riley, US (2004)
- Outpost, US (2009)
- Outrage, US (2009)
- Outrageous!, Canada (1977)
- Over the Edge, UK (2011)
- Oxygono (Οξυγόνο), Blackmail Boy, Greece (2003)
- Oy Vey! My Son Is Gay!!, US (2009)

== P ==
- Packed Lunch, Australia (2005)
- The Package (O Pacote), Brazil (2013)
- Pageant, US (2008)
- Pandora's Box (Die Büchse der Pandora), Germany (1929)
- Paname, France (2010)
- Pankh, India (2010)
- Paulo and His Brother (Paulo et son frère), France (1997)
- Papa faut que j'te parle... (Coming-out), France (2000)
- Paper Dolls (בובות נייר), Israel/Switzerland (2006)
- The Paperboy, US (2012)
- The Parade (Парада; Parada), Serbia (2011)
- Paragraph 175, UK/Germany/US (2000)
- Parallel Sons, US (1995)
- ParaNorman, US (2012)
- Pariah, US (2011)
- Paris 05:59: Théo & Hugo (Théo et Hugo dans le même bateau), France (2016)
- Paris Is Burning, US (1990)
- Paris, France, Canada (1993)
- Parole de king, France (2016)
- Parting Glances, US (1986)
- Partners, US (1982)
- Party Monster, US/Netherlands (2003)
- Party Monster: The Shockumentary, US (1998)
- The Pass, UK (2016)
- Paternity Leave, US (2015)
- Patrik, Age 1.5 (Patrik 1.5), Sweden (2008)
- Pauline, France (short, 2010)
- Payton Collins: Serial Rapist, US (2011)
- Peaches does herself, Canada (2012)
- Pecker, US (1998)
- Pédale douce, France (1996)
- Pédale dure, France (2004)
- Pedro, Portugal (2016)
- Pedro, US (2008)
- Pee Stains and Other Disasters, US (2005)
- People You May Know, US (2016)
- Peoria Babylon, US (1997)
- Per rectum, Russia (2005)
- Perdona bonita, pero Lucas me quería a mí (Excuse Me Darling, But Lucas Loved Me), Spain (1997)
- Perfect Cowboy, US (2015)
- A Perfect Ending, US (2012)
- The Perfect Family, US (2011)
- The Perfect Guy for My Girlfriend (Idealny facet dla mojej dziewczyny), Poland (2009)
- The Perfect Son, Canada (2000)
- The Perfect Wedding, US (2012)
- Periods of Rain, US (2010)
- The Perks of Being a Wallflower, US (2012)
- Permanent Residence (永久居留), Hong Kong (2009)
- Perpetual Adolescent (La eterna adolescente), Mexico/France (2025)
- Persécution, France (2009)
- Persona, Sweden (1966)
- Personal Best, US (1982)
- Peter's Friends, UK (1992)
- Petite faiblesse, France (2005)
- Petunia, US (2012)
- Peyote, Mexico (2013)
- The Phantom (O Fantasma), Portugal (2000)
- Phantom Images, US (2011)
- Philadelphia, US (1993)
- Philomena, UK/US/France (2013)
- Phoenix, US (2006)
- Pianese Nunzio, Fourteen in May (Pianese Nunzio, 14 anni a maggio; Sacred Silence), Italy (1996)
- Picnic at Hanging Rock, Australia (1975)
- The Picture of Dorian Gray, US (2006)
- Piglets (Ferkel), Germany (1999)
- The Pillow Book, France/UK/Netherlands/Luxembourg (1996)
- Pink Flamingos, US (1972)
- The Pink Mirror (Gulabi Aaina), India (2003)
- Pink Narcissus, US (1971)
- Pink Moon, US (2015)
- Pisau Cukur (Gold Diggers), Malaysia (2009)
- Pissoir (Urinal), Canada (1988)
- The Pirate (La Pirate), France (1984)
- The Pit and the Pendulum, US/Canada (2009)
- Pit Stop, US (2013)
- Pitch Perfect, US (2012)
- Pixote: A Lei do Mais Fraco (Pixote, the Law of the Weakest), Brazil (1981)
- Plainclothes, US (2025)
- Plan B, Argentina (2009)
- Plata Quemada (Burnt Money), France/Spain/Argentina/Uruguay (2000)
- Play the Devil, Trinidad and Tobago (2016)
- Pleasure Factory (快乐工厂), Singapore/Thailand (2007)
- Plein sud (Going South), France (2009)
- Plutôt d'accord, France (2004)
- Poco più di un anno fa (Adored), Italy (2003)
- Poison, US (1991)
- Poison Ivy, US (1992)
- The Politics of Fur, US (2002)
- Poltergay, France (2006)
- Pooltime, US (2010)
- Poor Girl (Pôv' fille), France (2003)
- Poor Things, UK/US (2023)
- Porn Start, Vance and Pepe's Porn Start, Canada (2011)
- Pornography: A Thriller, US (2009)
- Portland Street Blues (古惑仔情義篇之洪興十三妹), Hong Kong (1998)
- Portrait of a Lady on Fire (Portrait de la jeune fille en feu), France (2019)
- Portrait of Jason, US (1967)
- Possible Loves (Amores Possíveis), Brazil (2001)
- Post Cards from America, US/UK (1994)
- Postcards from London, UK (2018)
- Poster Boy, US (2004)
- Postmortem, US (2005)
- Pot Luck (L'Auberge Espagnole; The Spanish Apartment), France/Spain (2002)
- Pourquoi pas moi? (Why Not Me?), France/Spain/Switzerland (1999)
- Praia do Futuro (Futuro Beach), Brazil/Germany (2014)
- Prayers for Bobby, US (2009)
- Predestination, Australia (2014)
- Present Perfect (แค่นี้ก็ดีแล้ว), Thailand/Japan (2017)
- Presque rien (Almost Nothing; Come Undone), France/Belgium (2000)
- Prêt-à-Porter, US (1994)
- Pretty Boy, Australia (2020)
- Pretty Boy (Smukke dreng), Denmark (1993)
- The Pretty Boys, US (2011)
- Pretty Persuasion, US (2005)
- The Price of Love, US (1995)
- Prick Up Your Ears, UK (1986)
- Pride, UK (2014)
- Priest, UK (1994)
- Primero, Guatemala (2017)
- Princesa, Spain/Italy/France/UK/Germany (2001)
- Prisonnier, France (2004)
- Private Lessons, France/Belgium (2008)
- Privates on Parade, UK (1982)
- Prodigal Sons, US (2008)
- The Producers, US (1968)
- The Producers, US (2005)
- Producing Adults (Lapsia ja aikuisia – Kuinka niitä tehdään?), Finland/Sweden (2004)
- Project A-ko (プロジェクトA子), Japan (1986)
- Prom Queen: The Marc Hall Story, Canada (2004)
- Prora, Switzerland/Germany (2012)
- Protect Me From What I Want, UK (2009)
- Proteus, Canada/South Africa (2003)
- P.S. Burn This Letter Please, US documentary film (2020)
- P.S. Your Cat Is Dead, US (2002)
- Psycho Beach Party, US (2001)
- Pucallpa la Europea, Peru/France (2025)
- Puccini for Beginners, US (2007)
- Pulp Fiction, US (1994)
- Pulupot, Philippines (2005)
- Punk Berlin 1982 (Tod den Hippies!! Es lebe der Punk!), Germany (2015)
- Punks, US (2001)
- Purple Skies, India (2014)
- Pusong Mamon (Soft Hearts), Philippines (1998)
- Putting on the Dish, UK (2015)
- Pyotr495, Canada/Germany (2016)

== Q ==
- Quand on a 17 ans (Being 17), France (2016)
- Queen Christina, US (1933)
- Queens (Reinas), Spain (2006)
- Queer Boys and Girls on the Bullet Train (クィア・ボーイズ・アンド・ガールズ・オン・ザ・新幹線), Japan (2004)
- Queer Duck: The Movie, US (2006)
- Queercore: A Punk-u-mentary, Canada (1996)
- Queer Movie Butterfly: Adults' World, South Korea (2015)
- Quem Vai Ficar com Mário? (There's Something About Mario), Brazil (2021)
- Querelle, West Germany/France (1982)
- Quest (Thaang), India (2006)
- Quiet Days in Hollywood, Germany (1997)
- Quiet Night In, New Zealand (2005)
- Quinceañera, US (2006)
- Queer eye, US (2018)

== R ==
- Race You to the Bottom, US (2005)
- Rag Tag, UK/Nigeria (2006)
- Raging Sun, Raging Sky (Rabioso sol, rabioso cielo), Mexico (2009)
- The Rainbow, UK (1989)
- Rainbow Boys (เรนโบว์บอยส์ เดอะมูฟวี่), Right by Me, Thailand (2005); based on the novel by Alex Sánchez
- Rainbow Eyes (가면), Korea (2007)
- Rainbow Serpent (Haltéroflic), France (1983)
- Raising Heroes, US (1996)
- Ramón and Ramón (Ramón y Ramón), Peru/Spain/Uruguay (2024)
- Rapid Guy Movement, US (2004)
- The Raspberry Reich, Germany/Canada (2004)
- Rara, Chile (2016)
- Reach for Glory, UK (1962)
- Reaching for the Moon (Flores Raras), Brazil (2013)
- Ready? OK!, US (2008)
- Reality Bites, US (1994)
- Rebecca, US (1940)
- Rebel Without a Cause, US (1955)
- Rebound, US (2009)
- The Reception, US (2005)
- The Recruiter (Шиzа), Schizo, Kazakhstan/Russia/France/Germany (2004)
- Red Cow (Para Aduma), Israel (2018)
- Red Dirt, US (2000)
- Red Doors, US (2005)
- Red Lodge, US (2013)
- Red Ribbon Blues, US (1996)
- Red Ribbons, US (1994)
- Red River, US (1948)
- Red, White & Royal Blue, US (2023)
- Red Without Blue, US (2007)
- Redwoods, US (2009)
- Reel in the Closet, US documentary film (2015)
- Reflections in a Golden Eye, US (1967)
- Refrain (副歌), China (2006)
- Refugee's Welcome, Spain/Germany (2017; LGBT short film)
- Regarding Billy, US (2005)
- Regretters (Ångrarna), Sweden (2010)
- Regular Guys (Echte Kerle), Germany (1996)
- Reinas (Queens), Spain (2006)
- Reine Geschmacksache (Fashion Victims), Germany (2007)
- Relax... It's Just Sex!, US (1998)
- Release, UK (2010)
- Remission, UK (2014)
- Rent, US (2005)
- Replay (La répétition), France (2001)
- Rescuing Desire, US (1995)
- Retablo, Peru (2017)
- Return to Babylon, US (2011)
- Revenge of the Nerds, US (1984)
- Revoir Julie (Julie and Me), Canada (1998)
- Revolutionary Girl Utena: The Movie (少女革命ウテナ〜アドゥレセンス黙示録), Japan (1999)
- Rice Rhapsody (Hainan Chicken Rice 海南雞飯), Hong Kong/Singapore/Australia (2004)
- Right by Me (เรนโบว์บอยส์ เดอะมูฟวี่), Rainbow Boys, Thailand (2005); based on the novel by Alex Sánchez
- Rise Above: The Tribe 8 Documentary, US (2003)
- Rites of Passage, US (1999)
- Ritu (ഋതു; Seasons), India (2009)
- The Ritz, US (1976)
- The River (河流), Taiwan (1997)
- A River Made to Drown In, US (1997)
- Rivers Wash Over Me, US (2009)
- The Road to Love (Tarik el hob), France (2001)
- Road Movie (로드무비), South Korea (2002)
- Robin's Hood, US (2003)
- Rocketman, UK/US (2019)
- Rock Haven, US (2007)
- Rock Hudson's Home Movies, US (1992)
- The Rocky Horror Picture Show, UK (1975)
- Role/Play, US (2010)
- Un romance singular, Peru (2022)
- Rome and Juliet, Philippines (2006)
- Rome and Julius, Denmark (2009)
- Romeos (Romeos ...anders als du denkst!), Germany (2011)
- Ron the Zookeeper, Australia (2007)
- Ronda Nocturna (Night Watch), Argentina/France (2005)
- Room to Rent, France/UK (2000)
- Room in Rome (Habitación en Roma), Spain (2010)
- Rope, US (1948)
- Rosa Morena, Brazil/Denmark (2010)
- Rose by Any Other Name..., US (1997)
- Route of Acceptance, Canada (2012)
- Roxxxanne, Philippines (2007)
- Ruby Fruit (ルビーフルーツ), Japan (1995)
- Rückenwind (Light Gradient), Germany (2009)
- R U Invited?, US (2006)
- The Rules of Attraction, US/Germany (2002)
- Run(a)way Arab, UK (2018)
- Running Deep, US (2007)
- Running on Empty Dreams, US, (2009)
- Running with Scissors, US (2006)
- Ruok, US (2018)
- RuPaul Is: Starbooty!, US (1987)
- The Russian Dolls (Les Poupées russes), France/UK (2005)
- Rustin, US (2023)

== S ==
- Sa Bangji (사방지), Korea (1988)
- Sa Paraiso ni Efren (Efren's Paradise), Philippines (1999)
- The Sacrament (Het sacrament), Belgium (1989)
- Sacred Silence (Pianese Nunzio, 14 anni a maggio), Pianese Nunzio, Fourteen in May, Italy (1996)
- Sagwan, Philippines (2009)
- Saint, Belgium (1997)
- Saint Jack, US/Singapore (1979)
- Saints and Sinners, US (2004)
- Salò, or the 120 Days of Sodom (Salò o le 120 giornate di Sodoma), Italy/France (1975)
- Salmonberries, Germany (1991)
- Saltwater, US (2012)
- Salut, Victor, Canada (1989)
- Same Blood (Du même sang), France (2004)
- Same Difference, UK (2002)
- San Cristóbal, Chile (2014)
- San Diego Surf, US (1968)
- Sappho (Сафо. Кохання без меж), Ukraine (2008)
- Sarap Talaga ng Tite (Burat Fresh), Philippines (2011)
- Sasha, Germany (2010)
- Sassy Pants, US (2012)
- Satree Lek (สตรีเหล็ก), The Iron Ladies, Thailand (2000)
- Saturday Night at the Baths, US (1975)
- Saturn in Opposition (Saturno contro), Italy (2007)
- Saturn Returns, Israel/Germany (2009)
- Saturn's Return, Australia (2001)
- Saudade – Sehnsucht (Longing), Germany (2003)
- Saugatuck Cures, US (2014)
- Sauna the Dead: A Fairy Tale (Sauna the Dead), UK (2016)
- Savage Grace, US/France/Spain (2007)
- Savage Nights (Les Nuits fauves), France/Italy/UK (1992)
- Save Me, US (2007)
- Saved!, US (2004)
- Saved by the Belles, Canada (2003)
- Saving Face, US (2004)
- Saving Private Tootsie (พรางชมพู กะเทยประจัญบาน), Thailand (2002)
- Say Amen (תגיד אמן), Israel (2005)
- Say Uncle, US (2005)
- Sayew (สยิว), Thailand (2003)
- Scarred, UK (2007)
- Scènes de lit, France (1998)
- Scenes from a Gay Marriage, US (2012)
- Scenes from the Class Struggle in Beverly Hills, US (1989)
- Scenes of a Sexual Nature, UK (2006)
- Schizo (Шиzа), The Recruiter, Kazakhstan/Russia/France/Germany (2004)
- Schoolboy Crush (ボーイズ ラブ 劇場版; Boys Love, the Movie), Japan (2007)
- Score, US (1974)
- Scorpio Rising, US (1963)
- Scott Pilgrim vs. the World, US/UK/Japan (2010)
- Scotty and the Secret History of Hollywood, US (2017)
- Scrooge & Marley, US (2012)
- Scrubbers, UK (1982)
- The Sea (El mar), Spain (2000)
- The Sea Purple (Viola di mare), Italy (2009)
- Sebastian (När alla vet), Sweden/Norway (1995)
- Sebastian, Canada (2017)
- Sebastiane, UK (1979)
- Second Skin (Segunda piel), Spain (1999)
- The Secret Diaries of Miss Anne Lister, UK (2010)
- Secret Fantasies, Australia (1992)
- The Secret Path, UK (2014)
- Secret Places, UK (1984)
- The Secrets (הסודות), Israel (2007)
- See You in Hell, My Darling (Θα σε Δω στην Κόλαση Αγάπη μου), Greece (1999)
- Seeing Heaven, UK (2010)
- Selda (The Dying Inmate), Philippines (2008)
- Selamat Pagi, Malam (In the Absence of the Sun), Indonesia (2014)
- Senność (Drowsiness), Poland (2008)
- Señora de nadie (Nobody's Wife), Argentina (1982)
- Serene Hunter, France/US (2007)
- Serbis (Service), Philippines (2008)
- The Sergeant, US (1968)
- The Set, Australia (1970)
- Set It Off, US (1996)
- Set Me Free (Emporte-moi), Canada/Switzerland/France (1999)
- Sex in Chains (Geschlecht in Fesseln – Die Sexualnot der Strafgefangenen), Germany (1928)
- Sex Is..., US (1993)
- The Sex Monster, US (1999)
- The Sex Movie, US (2006)
- The Sex of the Stars (Le Sexe des étoiles), Canada (1993)
- Sex, Politics & Cocktails, US (2002)
- Shake It All About (En Kort en lang), Denmark (2001)
- Shank, UK (2009)
- The Shape of Water, US (2017)
- Shared Rooms, US (2016)
- She (เรื่องรักระหว่างเธอ), Thailand (2012)
- She Hate Me, US (2004)
- Shelter, US (2007)
- Shelter Me (Riparo – Anis tra di noi), Italy/France (2007)
- Shem, US (2004)
- She's Real, Worse Than Queer, UK/US (1997)
- She's beautiful when she's angry, New Zealand (2015)
- Shifting Gears: A Bisexual Transmission, US (2008)
- Shiner, US (2004)
- Shinku (深紅), Japan (2005)
- Shiva Baby, US/Canada (2020)
- Shock to the System, Canada/US (2006)
- Shojo Kakumei Utena: Adolescence Mokushiroku (Revolutionary Girl Utena: The Movie), Japan (1999)
- Shopping for Fangs, US/Canada (1997)
- Shortbus, US (2006)
- Showboy, Australia (2014)
- Showgirls, US/France (1995)
- Show Me Love (Fucking Åmål), Sweden/Denmark (1998)
- Shubh Mangal Zyada Saavdhan, India (2020)
- Shut Up and Kiss Me, US (2010)
- Sibak: Midnight Dancers, Philippines (1994)
- Sick Nurses (สวยลากไส้), Thailand (2007)
- Side Effects, US (2013)
- Sideline Secrets, US (2004)
- Sign, US (2016)
- Signature Move, US (2017)
- Sikil (Unspoken Passion), Philippines (2008)
- The Silence of the Lambs, US (1991)
- Silent Youth, Germany (2012)
- Silkwood, US (1983)
- Silly Girl, UK (2016)
- Silom Soi 2 (สีลมซอย 2), Thailand (2006)
- Silver Road, Canada (2007)
- The Silver Screen: Color Me Lavender, US (1997)
- Silverlake Life: The View from Here, US (1993)
- Simon, Netherlands (2004)
- Sin City, US (2005)
- Sin Destino, Mexico (2002)
- Singapore Sling, Greece (1990)
- A Single Man, US (2009)
- A Siren in the Dark, US (2009)
- Sirenas, Peru (2025)
- Sissy Frenchfry, US (2005)
- Sister Mary, US (2011)
- Sister My Sister, UK/US (1995)
- Sisters on the Road (지금, 이대로가 좋아요), Korea (2009)
- Sitcom, France (1998)
- Six Dance Lessons in Six Weeks, Hungary/US (2014)
- Six Degrees of Separation, US (1993)
- Size 'Em Up, US (short, 2001)
- The Ski Trip, US (2004)
- Skin & Bone, US (1996)
- Skin Deep, Canada (1995)
- Skin Gang, Skin Flick, Canada/UK/Japan (1999)
- The Skin I Live In (La piel que habito), Spain (2011)
- The Skinny, US (2012)
- Skoonheid (Beauty), South Africa (2011)
- Skull & Bones, US (2007)
- Slaves to the Underground, US (1997)
- Sleep with Me, US (1994)
- Sleep with Me, UK (2009)
- Sleepaway Camp, US (1983)
- Sleeping Beauties, US (short, 1999)
- Sleepover (Sova över), Sweden (2018)
- The Slight Fever of a Twenty-Year-Old (二十才の微熱), A Touch of Fever, Japan (1993)
- Slippery Ice, Russia (2003)
- Slutty Summer, US (2004)
- Small Town Gay Bar, US (2006)
- Snails in the Rain (שבלולים בגשם), Israel (2013)
- Snowtown, Australia (2011)
- The Smashing Bird I Used to Know, UK (1969)
- So Happy Together, Philippines (2004)
- Soapdish, US (1991)
- Socket, US (2007)
- Sobreviviré (I Will Survive), Spain (1999)
- Sodom's Cat (2016)
- Soft Hearts (Pusong Mamon), Philippines (1998)
- Soft Lad, UK (2015)
- Soldier's Girl, US (2003)
- Solo, Argentina (2013)
- Solos, Singapore (2007)
- Some Boys Do, Canada (2010)
- Some Like It Hot, US (1959)
- Some of My Best Friends Are..., US (1971)
- Someday This Pain Will Be Useful to You (Un giorno questo dolore ti sarà utile), Italy/US (2011)
- Somefarwhere, US (2011)
- Something About Alex (Anders), Netherlands (2017)
- Something for Everyone, UK (1970)
- Something Like Summer, US (2017)
- Something Must Break (Nånting måste gå sönder), Sweden (2014)
- Somewhere I Have Never Traveled (帶我去遠方), Taiwan (2009)
- Sommersturm (Summer Storm), Germany (2004)
- Son frère (His Brother), France (2003)
- Song Lang (Two Men), Vietnam (2018)
- A Song of Love (Un Chant d'Amour), France (1950)
- Songcatcher, US (2000)
- Soongava: Dance of the Orchids (सुनगाभा), Nepal (2012)
- Sordid Lives, US (2000)
- Sorority Boys, US (2002)
- Sound it out: the untitled LGTBQIA music documentary, US (2017)
- Soundless Wind Chime (無聲風鈴), Hong Kong/Switzerland (2009)
- Sounds from the Fog, Germany/Austria/Czech Republic (2013)
- Sous la neige, France (short, 2012)
- Southern Baptist Sissies, US (2013)
- The Spanish Apartment (L'Auberge Espagnole; Pot Luck), France/Spain (2002)
- The Spanish Gardener, UK (1957)
- Sparkler, US (1997)
- Spartacus, US (1960)
- Special Couple (合法伴侣), UK/China (2019)
- Speechless (無言), Hong Kong/China (2012)
- Speedway Junky, US (1999)
- Spetters, Netherlands (1980)
- Spidarlings, UK (2016)
- Spider Lilies (刺青), Ci Qing, Taiwan (2007)
- Spike, US (2008)
- Spin the Bottle, US (1999)
- Spinnin', Spain (2007)
- Spinning Gasing, Malaysia (2001)
- Splendor, US/UK (1999)
- Spoilers, UK/Australia (2016)
- Spooners, US (2013)
- A Spot of Bother (Une petite zone de turbulences), France (2010)
- Spring, UK (2011)
- Spring Fever (春风沉醉的晚上), China/Hong Kong/France (2009)
- A Stable for Disabled Horses, UK (2012)
- Stadt Land Fluss (Harvest), Germany (2011)
- Stage Beauty, UK/Germany/US (2004)
- Stage Mother, US (1933)
- Staircase, UK (1969)
- Stand (Противостояние), Russia/Ukraine/France (2014)
- Standing Still, US (2005)
- Star Appeal (星星相吸惜), China (2004)
- Starcrossed, US (2005)
- Stardom, Canada/France (2000)
- Starrbooty, US (2007)
- Starting Over, Japan (2014)
- Statross le Magnifique, France (2006)
- Star Wars: The Rise of Skywalker, US (2019)
- Steam, US (2009)
- Steam: The Turkish Bath (Hamam: Il Bagno Turco), Italy/Turkey/Spain (1997)
- Step Up and Be Vocal, Germany (2001)
- Stiff Upper Lips, UK (1998)
- Stille landskap, Norway (2003)
- Stoma (造口人), Hong Kong (2020)
- Stonewall, UK (1995)
- Stonewall, US (2015)
- Stonewall Uprising, US (2010)
- Story of a Bad Boy, US (1999)
- The Story of Piera (Storia di Piera), Italy (1983)
- The Story of the Stone (紅樓夢), Taiwan (2018)
- Straight (2007 film), Germany (2007)
- Straight (2009 film), India (2009)
- Straight A, US (2016)
- Straight for the Heart (À corps perdu), Canada/Switzerland (1988)
- Straight-Jacket, US (2004)
- Straight Men & the Men Who Love Them, Brazil (2005)
- Straight Story, Greece (2006)
- Straightman, US (2001)
- Strákarnir okkar (Eleven Men Out), Iceland (2005)
- Strange Bedfellows, Australia (2004)
- Strange Frame, US (2012)
- Strange Fruit, US (2004)
- The Strange One, US (1957)
- The Strange Ones, US/France (2011)
- Stranger by the Lake (L'Inconnu du lac), France (2013)
- The Stranger in Us, US (2010)
- Stranger Inside, US (2001)
- Strangers on a Train, US (1951)
- Strangers with Candy, US (2005)
- Strapped, US (2010)
- Strawberry and Chocolate (Fresa y Chocolate), Cuba/Mexico/Spain (1994)
- Stray Cats (Pusang gala), Philippines (2005)
- Streamers, US (1983)
- Strella (Στρέλλα; A Woman's Way), Greece (2009)
- The String (Le Fil), France/Belgium/Tunisia (2009)
- Strip Jack Naked, Nighthawks II, UK (1991)
- The Strong Ones (Los fuertes), Chile (2019)
- Struck by Lightning, US (2012)
- Stuck (short), US (2001)
- Stud Life, UK (2012)
- Stupid Boy (Garçon stupide), France/Switzerland (2004)
- Styx, Germany (2004)
- Such Good People, US (2014)
- Suddenly, Last Summer, US (1959)
- Suddenly, Last Winter (Improvvisamente l'inverno scorso), Italy (2008)
- Suffering Man's Charity, US (2006)
- Sugar, Canada (2004)
- Suicide Room (Sala samobójców), Poland (2011)
- Sukitomo (スキトモ), Japan (2006)
- The Sum of Us, Australia (1994)
- Sum Total, India/US (1999)
- Summer, UK (2006)
- A Summer Dress (Une robe d'été), France (1996)
- Summer in My Veins, US (1999)
- Summer of 85 (Été 85), France (2020)
- Summer of Mesa, US (2020)
- Summerland, UK (2020)
- The Summer of Sangailė (Sangailės vasara), Lithuania (2015)
- Summer Storm (Sommersturm), Germany (2004)
- Summer Things (Embrassez qui vous voudrez), France/UK/Italy (2002)
- Summer Vacation 1999 (1999年の夏休み), Japan (1988)
- Summertime (La Belle Saison), France, Belgium (2015)
- Sun Kissed, US (2006)
- Sunday Bloody Sunday, UK (1971)
- Sunday Morning, UK (2001)
- Sunny Skies, US (1930)
- Sunshine Cleaning, US (2009)
- Super 8½, Canada/Germany (1993)
- Supernatural (เหนือธรรมชาติ), Thailand (2014)
- Supernova, UK (2020)
- Supertwink, US (2006)
- Supervoksen (Triple Dare), Denmark (2006)
- Surprise, US (2015)
- Surprise Surprise, US (2009)
- Surrender Dorothy, US (2006)
- Surveillance, Surveillance 24/7, UK (2007)
- Sweat, UK (2008)
- Swiss Army Man, US (2016)
- Switch, US (1991)
- Swoon, US (1992)
- Sylvia Scarlett, US (1935)

== T ==
- Ta av mig (Undress Me), Sweden (2012)
- Taboo (御法度), Japan (1999)
- Take a Deep Breath (Диши дубоко; Diši duboko), Serbia (2004)
- Taking Woodstock, US (2009)
- The Talented Mr. Ripley, US (1999)
- Talladega Nights: The Ballad of Ricky Bobby, US (2006)
- Tamanna (तमन्ना; Desire), India (1997)
- Tammy, US (2014)
- Tan de repente (Suddenly), Argentina/Netherlands (2002)
- Tangerine, US (2015)
- Tan Lines, Australia (2006)
- Tanjong rhu (The Casuarina Cove), Singapore (2009)
- Tarnation, US (2003)
- A Taste of Honey, UK (1961)
- Taxi zum Klo (Taxi to the Toilet), West Germany (1981)
- Taylor Mead's Ass, US (1964)
- Tchindas, Cape Verde/Spain (2015)
- Tea and Sympathy, US (1956)
- Technoboys, Mexico (2024)
- Teddy, New Zealand (2009)
- Teens Like Phil, US (2012)
- Tell No One (Come non-detto), Italy (2012)
- Tell No One (Ne le dis à personne), France (2006)
- Tellin' Dad, UK (2017)
- Telstar: The Joe Meek Story, UK (2008)
- Tempting Heart (心動), Hong Kong (1999)
- Tender Fictions, US (1996)
- The Tenderness of Wolves (Die Zärtlichkeit der Wölfe), Germany (1973)
- Tenue de soirée, France (1986)
- Teorema (Theorem), Italy (1968)
- Terrifying Girls' High School: Lynch Law Classroom (恐怖女子高校 暴行リンチ教室), Japan (1973)
- Testosterone, US (2003)
- The 'Thank You' Girls, Philippines (2008)
- Thank You Mask Man, US (1971)
- That Boy, US (1974)
- That Certain Summer, US (1972)
- That Man: Peter Berlin, US (2005)
- That's What I Am, US (2011)
- Theft, US (2007)
- Thelma, Norway (2017)
- Théo et Hugo dans le même bateau (Paris 05:59), France (2016)
- There's Something About Mario (Quem Vai Ficar com Mário?), Brazil (2021)
- These Three, US (1936)
- Thieves (Les Voleurs), France (1996)
- Thin Ice, UK (1994)
- The Thin Pink Line, US (1998)
- Things You Can Tell Just by Looking at Her, US (2000)
- Third Man Out, Canada/US (2005)
- Thirteen, US (2003)
- Thirteen or So Minutes, short film, US (2008)
- Thirty Years of Adonis (Chinese: 三十儿立), Hong Kong/Taiwan (2017)
- This Guy's in Love with U Mare!, Philippines (2012)
- This Special Friendship (Les amitiés particulières), France (1964)
- Those People, US (2015)
- Those Who Love Me Can Take the Train (Ceux qui m'aiment prendront le train), France (1998)
- A Thousand Clouds of Peace (Mil nubes de paz cercan el cielo, amor, jamás acabarás de ser amor), Mexico (2003)
- Three Bewildered People in the Night, US (1987)
- Three of Hearts, US (1993)
- Three of Hearts: A Postmodern Family, US (2004)
- Three Summers (Tre somre), Denmark (2006)
- Three Times About It (Три раза про это Tri raza pro eto), Russia (2013)
- Three to Tango, US (1999)
- Three-Wheel-Stroller, UK (2018)
- Three Wishes (Drei Wünsche), Germany/Switzerland (2000)
- Threesome, US (1994)
- Through the Fields (Passer les champs), France (2015)
- Ticked-Off Trannies with Knives, US (2010)
- Tides of War, US (2005)
- Tied Hands (ידיים קשורות Yadaim kshurot), Israel (2006)
- Tiger Orange, US (2014)
- Time to Leave (Le Temps qui reste), France (2005)
- Times Have Been Better (Le Ciel sur la tête), France (2006)
- The Times of Harvey Milk, US (1984)
- Times Square, US (1980)
- Tin Holiday, US/UK (2018)
- Tipping the Velvet, UK (2002)
- Tiresia, France (2003)
- Tod den Hippies!! Es lebe der Punk! (Punk Berlin 1982), Germany (2015)
- To a Tee, US (2006)
- To an Unknown God (A un dios desconocido), Spain (1977)
- To Be or Not to Be, US (1983)
- To Die For, UK (1994)
- To Die Like a Man (Morrer como um Homem), Portugal (2009)
- To Each Her Own, Canada (2008)
- To Forget Venice (Dimenticare Venezia), Italy/France (1979)
- Top Gun (Tony Scott), United States (1986)
- To Play or To Die (Spelen of sterven), Netherlands (1990)
- To the Extreme (In Extremis), France (2000)
- To Wong Foo, Thanks for Everything! Julie Newmar, US (1995)
- Todo sobre mi madre (All About My Mother), Spain/France (1999)
- Together, UK (2013)
- Together (Tillsammans), Sweden/Denmark/Italy (2000)
- Together Alone, US (1991)
- The Toilers and the Wayfarers, US (1996)
- Tokyo Godfathers (東京ゴッドファーザーズ), Japan (2003)
- Tom at the Farm (Tom à la ferme), Canada (2013)
- Tom of Finland, Finland/Sweden/Denmark/Germany/US (2017)
- Tomboy, France (2011)
- Tomie (富江), Japan (1999)
- Tommy Trips (Thomas trébuche), France (1999)
- TommyTeen18, Netherlands (2017)
- Tongues Untied, US (1990)
- Tonight It's Me, US (2014)
- Too Outrageous!, Canada (1977)
- Tootsie, US (1982)
- Topless (トップレス), Japan (2008)
- Torch Song Trilogy, US (1988)
- The Torture Club (ちょっとかわいいアイアンメイデン), Japan (2014)
- Total Eclipse, Belgium/France/UK/Italy (1995)
- Totally Confused, US (1998)
- Totally Fucked Up, US (1993)
- Toto Forever, Spain, US (2009)
- A Touch of Fever (二十才の微熱), The Slight Fever of a Twenty-Year-Old, Japan (1993)
- Touch of Pink, Canada/UK (2004)
- Toul omry (طول عمري; All My Life), Egypt (2008)
- Tout le monde est parfait, France (1994)
- ToY, US (2015)
- Traces, US (2008)
- Trai nhảy (Dance Boy), Vietnam (2007)
- Training Rules, US (2009)
- The Traitor (Haboged), Israel (2009)
- Touch Me, US (2025)
- Transamerica, US (2005)
- Trans/formed, US (2007)
- TransGeneration, US (2005)
- Trantasia, US (2007)
- Trash, US (1970)
- Traumschiff Surprise – Periode 1, Germany (2004)
- Treading Water, US (2001)
- Trembling Before G-d, US (2001)
- Trevor, US (1994)
- The Trials of Oscar Wilde, UK (1960)
- Trick, US (1999)
- Trinidad, US (2008)
- A Trip (Izlet), Slovenia (2011)
- The Trip, US (2002)
- Triple Crossed, US (2013)
- Tropical Malady (สัตว์ประหลาด), Thailand (2004)
- Troubled Waters (Ô trouble), France (1999)
- Trouser Bar, UK (2016)
- Tru Loved, US (2008)
- True Love, US (2004)
- Truth, US (2013)
- The Truth About Alex, US/Canada (1986)
- The Truth About Jane, US (2001)
- Tucked, UK (2018)
- Tumbledown, US (2013)
- Tutok, Philippines (2009)
- Twilight Dancers, Philippines (2006)
- The Twilight of the Golds, US (1997)
- Twilight's Kiss (叔·叔), Hong Kong (2019)
- Twist, Canada (2003)
- Twisted, US (1996)
- Twisted Romance (Vil romance), Argentina (2008)
- Two Drifters (Odete), Portugal (2005)
- Two Mothers for Zachary, US (1996)
- Two Nights, Australia (2006)
- Two of Us, UK (1987)
- Two Young Men, UT (Twoyoungmen, UT.), US (2009)
- Twoyoungmen, UT. (Two Young Men, UT), US (2009)
- Typhoon Club (台風クラブ), Japan (1985)

== U ==
- Un amour à taire (A Love To Hide), France (2005)
- Un Año sin amor (A Year Without Love), Argentina (2005)
- Un Chant d'Amour (A Song of Love), France (1950)
- Una Giornata particolare (A Special Day), Italy (1977)
- Unconditional Love, US (2002)
- Uncut, Canada (1997)
- Under Heat, US (1996)
- Under One Roof, US (2002)
- Under the Tuscan Sun, US/Italy (2003)
- Undertow (Contracorriente), Peru (2009)
- Undress Me (Ta av mig), Sweden (2012)
- Undressing Israel: Gay Men in the Promised Land, Israel (2012)
- Une petite zone de turbulences (A Spot of Bother), France (2010)
- Une robe d'été (A Summer Dress), France (1996)
- Une voix d'homme, France (2002)
- An Unexpected Love, US (2002)
- Unicorns, UK (2023)
- The Uninvited, US (1944)
- A Union in Wait, US (2001)
- United States of Love (Zjednoczone Stany Miłości), Poland (2016)
- The Users, US (1978)
- Unsolved Suburbia, US (2010)
- Unspoken Passion (Sikil), Philippines (2008)
- Until the Moon Waxes (その月が満ちるまで; Sono tsuki ga michiru made), Japan (2007)
- Unveiled (Fremde Haut), Germany/Austria (2005)
- Uproar (Vacarme), France (2005)
- Urbania, US (2000)
- Utopians (同流合烏), Hong Kong (2015)
- Utukt, Norway (2000)

== V ==
- V for Vendetta, US (2005)
- Vacationland, US (2006)
- Valentine's Day, US (2010)
- Valerie and Her Week of Wonders (Valerie a týden divů), Czech Republic (1970)
- Valley of the Dolls, US (1967)
- Vampire Boys, US (2011)
- Vampire Diary, UK (2007)
- The Vampire Lovers, UK (1970)
- Vampyres, UK (1974)
- Vampyros Lesbos, Germany/Spain (1971)
- Vance and Pepe's Porn Start, Canada (2011)
- Vandals (Vandalen), Switzerland (2008)
- Vandread (ヴァンドレッド), Japan (2000)
- Vandread: The Second Stage, Japan (2001)
- Vdokh, vydokh (Вдох-Выдох; Breathe In, Breathe Out), Russia (2006)
- Vapors, US (1965)
- Velociraptor, Mexico (2014)
- Vegas in Space, US (1991)
- The Velocity of Gary, US (1998)
- Velvet Goldmine, US (1998)
- Venkovský učitel (The Country Teacher), Czech Republic/France/Germany (2008)
- A Very Natural Thing, US (1973)
- A Very Serious Person, US (2006)
- A Very Sordid Wedding, US (2017)
- VGL-Hung!, UK (2007)
- Vi finns inte längre (No More We), Sweden (2018)
- Vic and Flo Saw a Bear (Vic et Flo ont vu un ours), Canada (2013)
- Vicky Cristina Barcelona, US/Spain (2008)
- Victim, UK (1961)
- Victor and Victoria (Viktor und Viktoria), Germany (1933)
- Victor Victoria, US/UK (1982)
- Vidalita, Argentina (1949)
- Vier Fenster (Four Windows), Germany (2006)
- Vil romance (Twisted Romance), Argentina (2008)
- Vingarne (The Wings), Sweden (1916)
- Vinyl, US (1965)
- Viola di mare (The Sea Purple), Italy (2009)
- The Violation, US (2013)
- Violet Tendencies, US (2010)
- Violet's Visit, Australia (1995)
- The Virgin Machine (Die jungfrauen Maschine), West Germany (1988)
- A Virus Knows No Morals (Ein Virus kennt keine Moral), Germany (1986)
- VIS-à-VIS (Vis à Vis), Australia/UK (2013)
- Visions of Sugarplums, US (2001)
- Vito, US (2011)
- The Viva Voce Virus, UK (2007)
- Vive L'Amour (愛情萬歲), Taiwan (1994)
- Voor een Verloren Soldaat (For a Lost Soldier), Netherlands (1992)
- Voyage (遊), Hong Kong (2013)

== W ==
- W, Luxembourg/France (2003)
- Waiting for the Moon, UK/France/US/West Germany (1987)
- Walk a Mile in My Pradas, US (2011)
- Walk like a Man, Australia/US (2008)
- Walk on Water (ללכת על המים), Israel/Sweden (2004)
- The Walker, US/UK (2007)
- Walang Kawala (No Way Out), Philippines (2008)
- Want It, UK (2015)
- Wanted! (Nachbarinnen), Germany (2004)
- Waris Jari Hantu (The Ghastly Heir), Malaysia (2007)
- The War Boys, US (2009)
- The War Widow, US (1976)
- Warlock, US (1989)
- Wasabi Tuna, US (2003)
- Was nützt die Liebe in Gedanken (Love in Thoughts), Germany (2005)
- Watch Out, US (2008)
- Watch Over Me (Shmor Alai), Israel (2010)
- Water Boyy, Thailand (2015)
- Water Drops on Burning Rocks (Gouttes d'eau sur pierres brûlantes), France (2000)
- Water Lilies (Naissance des Pieuvres), France (2007)
- Waterberry Tears (Uva Mala), US (2010)
- Waterboys (ウォーターボーイズ), Japan (2001)
- Watercolors, US (2008)
- The Watermelon Woman, US (1996)
- The Way He Looks (Hoje Eu Quero Voltar Sozinho), Brazil (2014)
- Way Out West, US (1930)
- We All Die Alone, US (2021)
- We Are Animals, US (2013)
- We Are Dancers, UK (2019)
- We Are Okay Now (Vi er okay nu), Denmark (2017)
- We Could Be Parents, Sweden (2016)
- We Do, US (2015)
- We Once Were Tide, UK (2011)
- We Think the World of You, UK (1988)
- We Were Here, US (2011)
- We Were One Man (Nous étions un seul homme), France (1979)
- We Will Never Belong (Nunca seremos parte), Mexico (2022)
- The Wedding Banquet (喜宴), Taiwan/US (1993)
- Wedding Crashers, US (2005)
- Wedding Days (Días de voda), Spain (2002)
- A Wedding Most Strange, UK (2011)
- Wedding Wars, US (2006)
- Weekend, UK (2011)
- Weekend in the Countryside (Week-end à la campagne), France (2007)
- The Weight (무게), South Korea (2012)
- Welcome Home, Bobby, US (1986)
- Welcome to New York, US (2012)
- Were the World Mine, US (2008)
- We're Funny That Way!, Canada (1998)
- West Hollywood Motel, US (2013)
- West of Eden, New Zealand (2017)
- Westler, West Germany (1985)
- What Grown-Ups Know, Australia (2004)
- What Happens Next, US (2011)
- What Makes a Family, US (2001)
- What We Do Is Secret, US (2008)
- What You Looking At?, UK (2011)
- What's Cooking?, US (2000)
- When a Man Loves a Woman, UK (2016)
- When Beckham Met Owen (當碧咸遇上奧雲), Hong Kong (2004)
- When Boys Fly, US (2002)
- When Darkness Falls, Australia (2006)
- When Darkness Falls (När mörkret faller), Sweden/Germany (2006)
- When I'm 64, UK (2004)
- When Love Comes (When Love Comes Along), New Zealand (1998)
- When Night Is Falling, Canada (1995)
- When Steptoe Met Son, UK (2002)
- Where the Truth Lies, Canada/UK (2005)
- Whirlwind, US (2007)
- Whispering Moon (Das Flüstern des Mondes), Austria (2006)
- White Bird in a Blizzard, France/US (2014)
- White Chicks, US (2004)
- White Frog, US (2012)
- White Lie, Canada (2019)
- The Whiz Kids (Freunde), Germany (2001)
- Who Am I? (ខ្ងុំជាអ្នកណា), Cambodia (2009)
- Whole New Thing, Canada (2005)
- Who's Afraid of Vagina Wolf?, US (2013)
- Why Not Me? (Pourquoi pas moi?; ¿Entiendes?), France/Spain/Switzerland (1999)
- Wigstock: The Movie, US (1995)
- Wilby Wonderful, Canada (2004)
- Wild Flowers, UK (1989)
- Wild Reeds (Les roseaux sauvages), France (1994)
- Wild Side, UK/US (1995)
- Wild Side, Belgium/France/UK (2004)
- Wild Sky (Le Ciel en bataille), France/Switzerland (2011)
- Wild Things, US (1998)
- Wild Things 2, US (2004)
- Wild Tigers I Have Known, US (2006)
- Wild Zero, Japan (2000)
- Wilde, UK (1997)
- Die wilden Hühner und die Liebe, Germany (2007)
- The Wilding, Australia (2012)
- Will You Still Love Me Tomorrow? (明天記得愛上我), Taiwan (2013)
- Windows, US (1980)
- Winds of September (九降風), Taiwan (2008)
- The Windy City Incident, US (2005)
- Winter Kept Us Warm, Canada (1965)
- The Wise Kids, US (2011)
- The Wish Makers of West Hollywood, US (2010)
- Wish Me Away, US (2011)
- The Wishmakers, US (2011)
- With Every Heartbeat (Kyss mig; Kiss Me), Sweden (2011)
- Withered in a Blooming Season (少年花草黄), China (2005)
- Without Conscience (Verso nord), Italy (2004)
- The Witnesses (Les Témoins), France (2007)
- Wittgenstein, UK (1993)
- The Wolves of Kromer, UK (1998)
- A Woman Like Eve (Een Vrouw als Eva), Netherlands (1979)
- Woman on Top, US (2000)
- The Women I Love, US (1974)
- Women in Love, UK (1969)
- Women in Revolt, US (1973)
- Women Who Kill, US (2016)
- Women's Club (Club de Femmes), France (1936)
- Wonder Bar, US (1934)
- Wonder Boys, US (2000)
- A Wonderful Day, Australia (2004)
- Wonderland, The Fruit Machine, UK (1988)
- Word Is Out: Stories of Some of Our Lives, US (1977)
- Words of Devotion (愛の言霊 Ai no Kotodama), Japan (2008)
- Working It Out, Australia (2007)
- World and Time Enough, US (1994)
- A World for Raúl (Un mundo para Raúl), Mexico/Switzerland/US (2012)
- The World in Your Window, New Zealand (2017)
- The World Unseen, South Africa/UK (2007)
- Worried About the Boy, UK (2010)
- Woubi Chéri, France/Ivory Coast (1998)
- The Wound (Inxeba), South Africa/France/Germany (2017)
- Wrangler: Anatomy of an Icon, US (2008)
- Wrecked, US (2009)
- Wrestling (Bræðrabylta), Iceland (2007)
- WTC View, US (2005)

== X ==
- Xenia (Ξενία), Greece/France/Belgium (2014)
- XXY, Argentina (2007)

== Y ==
- Y Tu Mamá También (And Your Mother Too), Mexico/US (2001)
- The Yacoubian Building (عمارة يعقوبيان), Egypt (2006)
- Yaji and Kita: The Midnight Pilgrims (真夜中の弥次さん喜多さん), Japan (2005)
- Yaşamın Kıyısında (Auf der anderen Seite), The Edge of Heaven, Turkey/Germany (2007)
- Yeah Kowalski!, US (2013)
- The Year We Thought About Love, US (2015)
- A Year Without Love (Un Año sin amor), Argentina (2005)
- Yellow Hair 2 (노랑머리 2), South Korea (2001)
- Yes or No (อยากรัก ก็รักเลย), Thailand (2010)
- Yeti: A Love Story (2006)
- Yo soy la felicidad de este mundo (I Am Happiness on Earth), Mexico (2014)
- Yo, indocumentada (I, undocumented), Venezuela (2013)
- Yogoreta Nikutai Seijo (汚れた肉体聖女), Japan (1958)
- Yossi (הסיפור של יוסי; Yossi's Story), Israel (2012)
- Yossi & Jagger (יוסי וג'אגר), Israel (2002)
- You and I (Ты и я; Finding t.A.T.u.), Russia/US (2008)
- You and I, Germany (2014)
- You Are Not Alone (Du er ikke alene), Denmark (1978)
- You Belong to Me, US (2007)
- You I Love (Я люблю тебя), Russia (2005)
- You, Me and Him (Café com Leite), Brazil (2007)
- You Should Meet My Son!, US (2010)
- You'll Get Over It (À cause d'un garçon), France (2002)
- The Young and Evil (The Young & Evil), US (2008)
- Young and Wild (Joven y alocada), Chile (2012)
- Young Gods (Hymypoika), Finland (2003)
- Young Hearts, Belgium (2024)
- Young Man with a Horn, US (1950)
- Young Soul Rebels, UK (1991)
- The Young, the Gay and the Restless, US (2006)
- Young Törless (Der junge Törless), West Germany/France (1966)
- The Young Wolves (Les jeunes loups), France (1968)
- Your Friends & Neighbors, US (1998)
- Yours Emotionally, UK/India (2006)
- Your Name Engraved Herein , Taiwan (2020)
- The Yo-Yo Gang, Canada (1992)
- Yuriko, Dasvidaniya (百合子、ダスヴィダーニヤ), Japan (2011)
- Yuriko's Aroma (ユリ子のアロマ), Japan (2010)
- Yuwakusha (誘惑者), Japan (1989)

== Z ==
- Zankoku onna jōshi (残酷おんな情死), Japan (1970)
- Zenne Dancer, Turkey (2012)
- Zero Patience, Canada (1993)
- Zerophilia, US (2005)
- ZMD: Zombies of Mass Destruction, US (2010)
- Zorro, The Gay Blade, US (1981)
- ZsaZsa Zaturnnah Ze Moveeh, Philippines (2006)
- Zurück auf Los! (Return to Go!), Germany (2000)
- Zus & Zo, Netherlands (2001)

== See also ==
- List of feature films with lesbian characters
- List of feature films with gay characters
- List of feature films with bisexual characters
- List of feature films with transgender characters
- LGBTQ themes in horror fiction
- Lists of television programs with LGBT characters
- List of BL dramas
- List of lesbian filmmakers
- Films about intersex
- Homoeroticism
- Sexuality and gender identity-based cultures
- Straightwashing
