= Since the Last Time We Met =

2023 Argentine romantic drama film

- Theatrical film poster
- Spanish: Desde la última vez que nos vimos
- Directed by: Matías De Leis Correa
- Written by: Matías De Leis Correa
- Produced by: Matías De Leis Correa; Murray Dibbs
- Starring: Patricio Arellano; Esteban Recagno
- Cinematography: Evelyn Flores
- Edited by: Florencia Michelesi
- Music by: Fernando Nazar
- Release dates: April 21, 2023 (OUTshine); October 19, 2023 (Argentina)
- Running time: 81 mins.
- Country: Argentina
- Language: Spanish

Since the Last Time We Met (Spanish: Desde la última vez que nos vimos) is a 2023 Argentinian LGBTQ+ independent romantic drama film, written and directed by Matías De Leis Correa. He also co-stars alongside Patricio Arellano, Esteban Recagno, Martin Stark, and Josefina Langlois. It premiered at the OUTshine Film Festival in 2023, before a limited theatrical release throughout Argentina later that year.

== Synopsis ==
Handsome and stylish Victor is reunited by chance with David, his first love, fifteen years after the last time they saw each other. This reunion revives the clandestine love they had when they were younger.

== Cast ==
- Patricio Arellano as Victor
- Esteban Recagno as David
- Martin Stark as Alan
- Josefina Langlois as Beba
- Matías De Leis Correa as Peto

== Reception ==
Kevin Hall of Video Librarian rated the film 4.5/5 stars, praising the film's story: "The film's exploration of unresolved emotions and the struggle for authenticity make it a must-watch for anyone who appreciates a complex and heartfelt love story." Rich Cline of Shadows on the Wall gave it 4/5 stars, lauding the filmmaker: "Sensitive and introspective, this drama from Argentina explores a reunion that raises a range of lingering feelings. With its dialog-based script and limited cast and settings, the film feels like a play, packed with complex conversations that tap into deep ideas. Filmmaker Matias De Leis Correa quickly gets under the surface, exploring the knotty nature of relationships. So it's an involving and very moving film, packed with recognisable truths."

Meanwhile, Zachary Wild of The Rectangular View gave it 2.5/5 stars, ambivalent about the film overall: "[The film] is a light romantic drama that deals with a subject that should not be taken lightly, cheating. If director Matías De Leis Correa had gone into the topic more in depth, this would have been a good movie. But as it is, it's just okay." And Milagros Amondaray of La Nación lamented over the film's structure: "[The film] seeks to be a powerful story about second chances...but forgets several plot points along the way, among them, the real motive that keeps its protagonists apart."
