= The Falls (2012 film) =

2012 American drama film

- Theatrical film poster
- Directed by: Jon García
- Written by: Jon García
- Produced by: Jon García
- Starring: Nick Ferrucci; Benjamin Farmer
- Cinematography: Christopher J. Stephens
- Edited by: Jon García; William Schultz
- Music by: Jon García; Raelyn Olson
- Release dates: August 19, 2012 (Vancouver); December 1, 2012 (United States)
- Running time: 115 mins.
- Country: United States
- Language: English

The Falls is a 2012 American LGBTQ+ drama film, written and directed by Jon García. The film stars Nick Ferrucci and Benjamin Farmer. It premiered at Out On Screen in Vancouver in 2012, before its limited theatrical release throughout the United States later that year.

== Synopsis ==
Two young Mormon missionaries fall in love while serving together in Oregon.

== Cast ==
- Nick Ferrucci as Elder R.J. Smith
- Benjamin Farmer as Elder Chris Merrill
- Justin Kolezar as Craig
- Quinn Allan as Elder Harris
- Harold Phillips as Thomas Smith
- Brian Allard as Rodney
- Paulo Angelo as Jim Davis
- Emily Gleason as Sister Tulsa
- Luisa Guyer as Lydia Davis

== Reception ==
Adrian Mack of The Georgia Straight lauded the lead's performance: "If the film suffers from some uneven performances, Nick Ferrucci hits every right note as Elder Smith, especially when he uses compassion and humour to leverage a human response out of his starchier and more nervous companion." Henry Tucker of Blueprint Review rated it 4/5 stars and praised the filmmaker: "Director and writer (and producer) Jon García is definitely one with talent." Richard Propes of The Independent Critic applauded the film as well: "While it won't be for everyone, The Falls is a terrific film for those who embrace independent thought, spiritual seeking and cinematic transcendence."

== Sequels ==
The Falls Trilogy consists of two subsequent sequels: The Falls: Testament of Love (2013) and The Falls: Covenant of Grace (2016).
