= The Art of Being Straight =

- Directed by: Jesse Rosen
- Screenplay by: Jesse Rosen
- Produced by: Ursula Camack, Jesse Rosen, Amy Wasserman, Laurence Ducceschi
- Starring: Johnny Ray
- Cinematography: Aaron Torres
- Edited by: Robert Schulbaum
- Music by: Trevor Howard
- Release date: June 20, 2008 (Frameline Film Festival)
- Running time: 71 minutes
- Country: United States
- Language: English

The Art of Being Straight is a 2008 film by Jesse Rosen on Malvern Productions. He also wrote the screenplay and plays the lead role of Jon. The film explores Jon's unexpected search for identity. The film was an official selection at the 2008 Frameline Film Festival and the Philadelphia International Gay & Lesbian Film Festival.

== Plot ==
Jon, an aspiring photographer, breaks up with his girlfriend, and moves west to Los Angeles for a new start. He thinks he's got it all figured out. He's young, good looking and has always had a way with the ladies. He meets old acquaintances, Andy and Maddie. Then he gets introduced to Maddie's girlfriend, Anna. Jon takes an entry-level position at an ad agency, but things develop with Paul, a successful executive at the firm, who takes a special interest in John. Eventually they end up together in Paul's bed, and his world turns upside down.

== Cast ==
- Jesse Rosen as Jon
- Johnny Ray as Paul
- Jared Grey as Andy
- Rachel Castillo as Maddy
- Emilia Richeson as Anna
- Jim Dineen as Young Male Office Assistant
- Jesse Janzen as Brian
- Tyler Jenich as Cole
- Alan LaPolice as Rand
- Bryan McGowan as Matt
- Anne Reeder as Simone
- Dana May Salah as Renee
- Pete Scherer as Aaron
- Jen Zaborowski as Bela
