= I Am Gay and Muslim =

English-language documentary (2021)

- Directed by: Chris Belloni
- Cinematography: Bram Belloni
- Release date: 2012
- Running time: 59 minutes
- Country: Morocco
- Language: English

I Am Gay and Muslim is a 2012 English-language documentary directed by Chris Belloni. Filmed in Morocco, it follows five gay Muslim men as they explore their religious and sexual identity. The film has been screened in more than a dozen countries.

The cinematography was done by Bram Belloni, the director's brother.

== Kyrgyzstan ban ==
On 28 September 2012, the documentary was scheduled to be screened at the sixth annual Bir Duino ('One World') human-rights film festival in Bishkek, Kyrgyzstan. Immediately before its screening, the State Committee on Religious Affairs asked the Prosecutor General's office to ban the film, saying that "its aim is to provoke the Muslim population and to incite religious intolerance". The Prosecutor General sued to prevent the screening in the Prevomaiskii District court, which banned showing or distributing the film in the country.
