= Matthew Montgomery (actor) =

American actor

- Born: Matthew Robert Ramírez; March 16, 1978 (age 48); Houston, Texas, United States
- Occupation: Actor
- Years active: 2000–present
- Spouse: Steve Callahan (m. 2015)

Matthew Montgomery (born Matthew Ramirez; March 16, 1978) is an American actor, writer, producer, and director. He was born in Houston, Texas and raised in Corpus Christi, and has been recognized for his lead roles in LGBTQ+ cinema beginning in the early 2000s. Montgomery is known for his breakthrough debut appearance in Gone, But Not Forgotten in 2003.

Starting in 2006, he teamed up with production company Guest House Films where he produced five features: Long-Term Relationship, Back Soon, Three-Day Weekend, Make the Yuletide Gay, and Role/Play.

== Early life ==
Montgomery was born in Houston, Texas, and grew up in Corpus Christi. He became involved in the arts at a young age, mainly due to the influences from his father, who is of Mexican descent. Montgomery's father is an artist and once co-opted a gallery in the 1980s – Gallería Chaparral – in Corpus Christi, where Montgomery has stated in interviews that he met many of his father's friends who were also involved in the arts, including many artists, actors and directors.

He also has European heritage on his mother's side, with her family originating from Ukraine.

He was first introduced to theater in grade school where he was involved in many plays and theatre projects. Meanwhile, his interest in film also began to blossom. Montgomery recalls in interviews that his step-mother first introduced him to classic cinema when he was little, which has highly influenced him as a storyteller and writer/director to this day. In interviews, he has often reflected on the work of Alfred Hitchcock.

== Career ==
Montgomery moved to Los Angeles to pursue his dream of becoming an actor. Shortly after moving to the city, he had his first major breakthrough, securing the lead role in the Michael D. Akers film, Gone, But Not Forgotten. The film was released in 2003 and followed Montgomery's character, Mark, who, after suffering amnesia following a fall, becomes part of an unexpected affair. The film was screened at over 30 film festivals as part of its release. His next film was Bob Logan's Yard Sale, which was released in 2004. The humorous film followed a couple following a breakup, with Montgomery playing the role of Sean.

Over the next couple of years, Montgomery starred in a number of films including Daniel Lee's road drama, Journeyman, and Rob Williams's gay romantic comedy, Long-Term Relationship. In 2007, Montgomery had another major career milestone when he landed a lead role in the erotic thriller, Socket. The film is a dark sexual tale of a gay man being drawn into a cult of electricity addicts after being struck by lightning. Playing the role of Dr. Craig Murphy, Montgomery saw the film pickup numerous festivals, including Best of Festival Award Jury Prize for The Indianapolis LGBT Film Festival.

After starring in the 2008 horror film Fear House, Montgomery found more success in the 2009 gay horror film, Pornography: A Thriller. Playing the lead role of Michael Castigan, the film premiered at Newfest in New York City and followed up with other screenings at major LGBT film festivals around the world. The film won FilmOut San Diego's Audience Award in 2010. The film is set in three parts, follows Montgomery's character in the second part who searches for adult film actor Mark Anton, following his mysterious disappearance. Montgomery was singled out for praise from both the New York Times and CinemaQueer for his depiction of the role. New York Times described his performance as a "standout", while QueerCinema called him as "especially likable." Montgomery later receivedthe Philadelphia QFest 2010 Artistic Achievement Award for acting and producing.

Montgomery was especially prolific in 2010, starring in multiple projects that year. The highlight was starring opposite his now husband Steve Callahan in the film, Role/Play, which studies the complexities of gay relationships in the celebrity community after an outed soap opera actor crosses paths with a recently divorced gay marriage activist. Montgomery also starred in the film Flight of the Cardinal, and made an appearance on an episode of Discovery's I Didn't Know I Was Pregnant docuseries that same year.

In 2011, Montgomery produced and played the lead role of Clark Townsend in Finding Mr. Wright. The film is a lighthearted romantic comedy about a talent manager who finds unexpected love and personal growth while on a retreat with his troubled client, played by Rebekah Kochan. The film had its premiere at the Philadelphia QFest on July 13, 2011. It then moved on to a screening at FilmOut San Diego on August 20, 2011. Queerty highlighted Montgomery's comedic skills, noting that he "gets to—ahem—flex his funny bone" in the film, which features a "fast-talking script, funny performances and a nice message about self-improvement and self-care." He completed 2011 playing Pete in six episodes of the web series, Girl Parts. Montgomery then starred in numerous films over the next couple of years, including I Want to Get Married and The Dark Side of Love.

During a short hiatus in his acting career, he went on to pursue his MFA in Film/TV Production at the University of Southern California School of Cinematic Arts, emphasizing in writing and directing. Montgomery had his directorial debut with the psychological thriller, Devil's Path in 2019. The plot follows two men who are deadly game of cat-and-mouse while cruising on a hiking trail. In 2022, Montgomery recently played the lead role of Max in All Kinds of Love. The plot focuses on a gay couple who choose to divorce right after the Supreme Court’s 2015 decision to legalize same-sex marriage nationally. As weddings bloom around him, Max—a gay man set in his ways—faces the challenge of beginning a new chapter. Montgomery was also a producer on All Kinds of Love.

Montgomery is currently writing and developing his next thriller while working as a writers’ assistant for the long-running soap, Days of our Lives.

== Personal life ==
Montgomery is gay and is married to actor Steve Callahan. They were married in 2015 after 7 years together. Montgomery and Callahan have starred together on-screen, notably when they both played lead roles together in Rob Williams' film Role/Play.

== Filmography ==
=== Acting roles ===
Year	Film	Role	Director
2003	Gone, But Not Forgotten	Mark Reeves	Michael D. Akers
2004	Yard Sale	Sean	Bob Logan
2004	Bob Steel	Augustino	Will Wallace
2005	Journeyman	Marx	Daniel Lee
2006	Long-Term Relationship	Glenn Phillips	Rob Williams
2007	Back Soon	Gil Ramirez	Rob Williams
2007	Socket	Craig Murphy	Sean Abley
2008	Fear House	Mortimer Gladstein	Michael R. Morris
2009	Pornography: A Thriller	Michael Castigan	David Kittredge
2009	Redwoods	Chase	David Lewis
2009	I Didn't Know I Was Pregnant (TV)	Nurse	N/A
2010	Role/Play	Trey Reed	Rob Williams
2010	Flight of the Cardinal	Andy Myer	Robert Gaston
2011	Finding Mr. Wright	Clark Townsend	Nancy Criss
2011	I Want to Get Married	Paul Roll	William Clift
2011	Girl Parts (TV)	Pete	N/A
2012	The Dark Side of Love		Jorge Ameer
2012	The Cinderella Effect	Gregg Reynolds	Shane Morton
2013	The First 35	Mr. Hobbs	Derek Cole
2014	Orson Welles: War of the Worlds	Orson Welles	Derek Cole
2014	Bro, What Happened?	Matthew	Dante
2014	Within Hindsight	Killer	Derek Cole
2018	Devil's Path	Steve	Directed by Montgomery
2018	Clayton Howe's Entertainmentx	Unknown	Unknown
2022	All Kinds of Love	Max	David Lewis

=== Director/production ===
Year	Title	Director	Producer
2018	Devil's Path	Yes	Yes
