= Socket (film) =

- DVD cover
- Directed by: Sean Abley
- Written by: Sean Abley
- Produced by: John Carrozza; Doug Prinzivalli; Matt Mishkoff; Sean Abley
- Starring: Derek Long; Matthew Montgomery; Rasool Jahan; Allie Rivenbark; Alexandra Billings
- Cinematography: Ivan Corona
- Edited by: David Kittredge
- Music by: Jennifer Kes Remington
- Distributed by: TLA Releasing
- Release dates: July 14, 2007 (Philadelphia International Gay and Lesbian Film Festival)
- Running time: 90 minutes
- Country: United States
- Language: English

Socket is an independent sci-fi erotic thriller directed by Sean Abley, produced by John Carrozza, Sean Abley, Matt Mishkoff and Doug Prinzivalli, and starring Derek Long as Dr. Bill and Matthew Montgomery as Dr. Craig Murphy. It was released in 2007.

== Plot ==
Socket is a dark sexual tale of a gay man being drawn into a cult of electricity addicts after being struck by lightning. Bill (Derek Long), a surgeon, is struck by lightning and winds up recovering in his own hospital. There he meets an intern named Craig (Matthew Montgomery), who suffered the same natural accident and has developed an appetite - a capacitance - for electrical voltage. After meeting him, Bill realizes he has the same craving. Craig introduces him to an underground group of people who all share this addiction. Bill then uses his surgical knowledge to come up with a method of inserting electric sockets and prongs into the members' wrists so they can "juice up". But after Bill accidentally discovers that he can mainline electricity from living people, he becomes hooked on absorbing this particular kind of power.

== Cast ==
- Derek Long as Dr. Bill Matthews
- Matthew Montgomery as Dr. Craig Murphy
- Rasool Jahan as Carol
- Allie Rivenbark as Olivia
- Alexandra Billings as Dr. Emily Andersen

Supporting cast includes Sean Abley, Jay Costelo, Georgia Jean, Victor López, Amy Sidney, Sandy Lawson, Alisha Seaton and Bridgette Wright as members of "the group".

Also appearing in smaller roles are Andrew Pinon, Bobaloo Koenig, Krista Pelen, Shanee Wilson, Staci Mallett, Rhoda Pell, Mari Marks, Timothy J. Hearl, Doug Prinzivalli, Tony Spatafora, Shannon Lee, Erin Scott, Ray Tutano, Eddie Borey, Brad Taylor, John Carrozza, Jessica Jones and Gage Hubbard.

== Release history ==
Socket had its World Premiere on July 14, 2007, at the Philadelphia International Gay & Lesbian Film Festival and was followed by its West Coast Premiere on July 20 in Los Angeles at Outfest 07. It was released on DVD on 25 March 2008 by TLA Releasing in the US. On 9 June 2008, the DVD was released in Europe.

== Awards ==
The film was awarded an AT&T Pioneers: Best of Festival Award jury prize at The Indianapolis LGBT Film Festival in November 2007.

== Reception ==
Don Willmott from Filmcritic.com also noted "low-powered sci-fi exercise is actually a soft-core gay skin flick masquerading as some kind of "thriller" ". Martin Gray from eyeforfilm.co.uk was more savage about the film, saying "thriller isn't the word I'd use to describe the film - "borer" maybe. "Stupid", "insulting" and "witless" also come to mind. Let's be generous and go for a phrase or two such as "badly written" and "ineptly acted"."
