= Phoenix (2006 film) =

- Theatrical release poster
- Directed by: Michael Akers
- Screenplay by: Michael D. Akers; Sandon Berg
- Produced by: Sandon Berg (producer); Israel Ehrisman (co-producer)
- Starring: Chad Edward Bartley; Gaetano Jones; Jeff Castle
- Cinematography: Chris Brown
- Edited by: Michael D. Akers
- Music by: Aram Mandossian
- Distributed by: United Gay Network
- Release date: 2006
- Country: United States
- Language: English

Phoenix is a 2006 film by American director Michael Akers, his third feature film after Gone, But Not Forgotten (2003) and Matrimonium (2005). The film was produced by Sandon Berg with Israel Ehrisman as co-producer and starred Chad Edward Bartley as Dylan, Gaetano Jones as Kenneth Sparks and Jeff Castle as Demetrius Stone. The film was distributed by United Gay Network. This film was inspired by Michaelangelo Antonioni's film L'Avventura and adds a gay twist.

== Synopsis ==
Phoenix is the story of a suspenseful and mysterious journey of two jilted lovers following the trail of their mutual betrayer. Ken Sparks (played by Gaetano Jones) has had some urgent business matter to attend in Phoenix, Arizona after a land deal has gone sour. In the process, he is also leaving behind his boyfriend Dylan (Chad Edward Bartley), making promises for Dylan's birthday. Despite Dylan having delusions that Ken might be the one for him, Ken on the other hand does not want Dylan to join him in Phoenix.

Betrayed by false promises, Dylan asks about him and discovers not only that Ken has altogether disappeared from the scene, but that he has had a long-term and ongoing relationship with his "husband" Demetrius Stone (Jeff Castle). Now Ken has also dumped Demetrius as well and disappeared.

Seeing the joint predicament both lovers are in because of Ken's betrayal of them both, Dylan and Demetrius feel an affinity building up between them and eventually fall in love together. The film is subtitled as "Every broken heart is a chance for a new beginning..." or as Dylan says to Demetrius: "maybe this is destiny, and maybe this whole thing with Ken was just to bring us together" although they both obviously live in the spell of their common lover. And as they admit, "this is not easily done" and is "an awful lot of trouble to go through" and realizing this new love "cannot replace him [Ken]".

== Cast ==
- Chad Edward Bartley as Dylan
- Gaetano Jones as Ken Sparks
- Jeff Castle as Demetrius Stone
- Conrad Angel Corral as Lewis
- Bruce Cronander as Gunther
- A.J. Sullivan as Detective Smith
- Deven Green as resort trainee
- Joel Bryant as security guard
- Stephen McCarthy as jazz singer

== Screenings ==
The film was an official selection on many festivals including:

- Reeliong Chicago Gay & Lesbian Film Festival
- Philadelphia International Gay & Lesbian Film Festival
- Pittsburgh International Film Festival
