= Are You Proud? =

- Directed by: Ashley Joiner
- Produced by: Dan Cleland
- Distributed by: Peccadillo Pictures
- Release date: February 28, 2019 (Glasgow Film Festival)
- Running time: 100 minutes
- Language: English

Are You Proud? is a 2019 documentary about the LGBT rights movement in the UK directed by Ashley Joiner.

== Reception ==
In Ed Potton's review of the film for The Times, he noted its "fatal lack of focus" and a scope that is "ambitiously wide." He rated it 2 out of 5 stars.

Anna Smith for Time Out described the film as "often inspiring... While not exhaustive, this is a thought-provoking watch." She rated it a 4 out of 5 stars.

Wendy Ide for The Guardian rated the film 4 out of 5 stars, stating that it is "informative but sometimes unwieldy" and "attempts to address intersectionality" but that it may have been better as a multi-part television show.
