= NLJ =

NLJ may mean:

- Nathan Leigh Jones, a recording artist
- The National Liberty Journal, a newspaper published by Jerry Falwell
- The National Law Journal
- National Library of Jamaica
- Nonlinear junction, particularly the p–n junction; see nonlinear junction detector
