= The House That Jack Built (2013 film) =

2013 film by Henry Barrial

- Directed by: Henry Barrial
- Written by: Joseph B. Vasquez
- Produced by: Michael Lieber; Hitesh Patel; Sam Kitt; Mark Stolaroff
- Starring: E. J. Bonilla; Melissa Fumero; Saundra Santiago; Leo Minaya; Desmin Borges; John Herrera; Flor De Liz Perez; Rosal Colon
- Cinematography: Luca Del Puppo
- Edited by: Eric Strand
- Music by: Lili Haydn; Chris Westlake
- Production company: Walk Up Productions
- Distributed by: Vega Baby Releasing
- Release dates: June 16, 2013 (LAFF); November 6, 2015 (United States)
- Running time: 87 minutes
- Country: United States
- Language: English
- Budget: $130,000

The House That Jack Built is a 2013 American drama film directed by Henry Barrial and written by Joseph B. Vasquez. It stars E. J. Bonilla in the title role, with Melissa Fumero, Saundra Santiago, Leo Minaya, Desmin Borges, John Herrera, Flor De Liz Perez, and Rosal Colon in supporting roles. It follows an ambitious young Latino man who buys a small apartment building in the Bronx and moves his entire boisterous family in to live rent-free.

The film had its world premiere at the Los Angeles Film Festival on June 16, 2013. It was released in select theaters and on VOD on November 6, 2015, by Vega Baby Releasing. It received mixed-to-positive reviews from critics, who praised the performances of the cast, particularly Bonilla.

== Cast ==
- E. J. Bonilla as Jack Maldonado
- Melissa Fumero as Lily
- Leo Minaya as Richie
- Flor De Liz Perez as Rosa
- Saundra Santiago as Martha
- John Herrera as Carlos
- Rosal Colon as Nadia
- Javier Muñoz as Hector
- Desmin Borges as Manny
- Danny Henriquez as Willie
- Raymond T. Williams as Tommy
- Judith Delgado as Abuela
- Jose Soto as Flea
- Fidel Vicioso as Chino
- George Bass as Priest
- William De Jesus Suarez as Drug Addict
- Nathalie Lyon as Marie
- Dolores Fleming as Sada
- Julio Angel Feijoo as Indio
- Perry Martijena as Young Jack
- Isabela Merced as Young Nadia
- Jeremy Fernandez as Young Richie
- Tyler Alvarez as Young Hector
- Jonah Rosario as Young Manny

== Production ==
The House That Jack Built was directed by Henry Barrial from a screenplay that Joseph B. Vasquez had written before his death in 1995. The film's producer, Michael Lieber, who was Vasquez's friend and colleague, helped Barrial revise the script and gave him a better understanding of Vasquez. Principal photography began in May 2012 in New York, and lasted 18 days, with an estimated $130,000 budget.

== Release ==
The House That Jack Built had its world premiere at the Los Angeles Film Festival on June 16, 2013. In September 2015, Vega Baby Releasing acquired North American distribution rights to the film. It was given a limited theatrical release on November 6, 2015, and was simultaneously released on video on demand.

== Reception ==
=== Critical response ===
Sheri Linden of The Hollywood Reporter stated, "Working-class realism and a charismatic lead performance elevate a story that tends toward cliche." Linden also wrote, "Barrial taps into the everyday reality of his characters' New York with an impressive immediacy."

Andy Webster of The New York Times described the film as "a New York City kitchen sink drama" and opined, "There is solid ensemble acting, particularly by Mr. Bonilla, who dependably anchors a movie that is almost too busy. There is theatrical excess, as well, in the unrelenting pileup of dramatic situations, which hobbles the film's credibility."

Martin Tsai of the Los Angeles Times called the film "gritty and authentic" and commented, "The personality flaws of the characters and the dysfunctions of the household are instantly recognizable from this very capable cast, yet they never come off as cliché."

=== Accolades ===
The House That Jack Built was awarded Best Picture, Best Director, and Best Screenplay at the 2014 Phoenix Film Festival. It also won the Audience Award, while Barrial was given Best Director Narrative Feature at the 2014 Queens World Film Festival.
