= Finding Mr. Wright =

2011 American romantic comedy film directed by Nancy Criss

- Directed by: Nancy Criss
- Written by: Jake Helgren
- Produced by: Nancy Criss; Tracy Wright; Matthew Montgomery
- Starring: Matthew Montgomery; Rebekah Kochan; David Moretti
- Cinematography: Damon Britain
- Edited by: Nancy Criss; Sandra Mohr
- Music by: Matthew Janszen
- Production companies: NANDAR Entertainment; Proteus Pictures
- Release date: July 13, 2011
- Running time: 101 minutes
- Country: United States
- Language: English

Finding Mr. Wright is a 2011 American romantic comedy film directed by Nancy Criss. It was produced by Matthew Montgomery and Nancy Criss, and written by Jake Helgren. The film stars Matthew Montgomery, Rebekah Kochan, David Moretti, Jason Stuart, Scotch Ellis Loring, Rasool J'Han and Evan Miller. The film had its premiere at the Philadelphia QFest on July 13, 2011. It then moved on for a screening at FilmOut San Diego on August 20, 2011.

== Plot ==
Clark Townsend is single and gay, along with being a successful Hollywood talent manager. His client, and best friend Eddy Malone, is a popular TV actress who is a booze loving party girl. Her constant partying is making Clark and his cross dressing secretary Goldie, increasingly high strung. Eddy's publicist TJ is fed up with the constant drama as well. So TJ invites Pearce Wright, a life coach and counselor, who also happens to be gay, to a party to try and straighten Eddy out. After witnessing her antics at the party, Pearce suggests a weekend wilderness therapy retreat to bring her back down to earth. Pearce also has an ulterior motive for the retreat, because after meeting Clark at the party, he is attracted to Clark and wants to see if there is a possible relationship to be developed. The whole crew, and a few tag-alongs all decide to go, and when they arrive, Pearce begins the task of leading this unusual and diverse group of characters to a new outlook on life. In the end, Clark and Pearce finally get together and begin a relationship.

== Cast ==
- Matthew Montgomery as Clark Townsend
- Rebekah Kochan as Eddy Malone
- David Moretti as Pearce Wright
- Jason Stuart as Phillip
- Scotch Ellis Loring as Geoffrey
- Edward Gusts as Cooper
- Rasool J'Han as TJ
- Keye Chen as Goldie
- Evan Miller as Gage
- Cameron Cash as Sam
- Ryan Anthony as Steve

== Production notes and release ==
Both Montgomery and Driss served as executive producers on the film, and both of their production companies, Montgomerys' Proteus Pictures, and Driss' NANDAR Entertainment were in charge of production for the project. The movie was filmed on location in California, with select filming at Arrowbear Lake and Castaic Lake State Recreation Area. The film premiered at the Philadelphia QFest on July 13, 2011, and was then screened at the FilmOut San Diego LGBT Film Festival on August 20, 2011. It also had a screening at Central Florida Film Festival on September 2, 2011. The movie was released to DVD in 2012.

== Critical reception ==
Out in Jersey gave it a positive review saying "the characters are real, in depth and totally believable and inevitably remind us of people we know in our own lives. This is a charming movie and a lot of fun". This Week in Texas was also pleased with the film, stating the wilderness setting was "beautiful" and had an "attractive cast and constant awkwardness", which made the film an "enjoyable retreat for its viewers". David Hall of Gay Celluloid was generally satisfied stating, "not all of the thick and fast jokes hit the mark, but there's equally no denying the overwhelming fun of the piece". He said the actors performances were "somewhat uneven at times", but overall, "Criss undeniably knows her market and her feel good approach shows in this cinematic medley of one-liner styled laughs and emotional observations on life and love".

Edge Media said that although the title of the film was lame, this "gay indie is a cut above the standard fare, with decent writing, good direction, and even some talented acting". They also pointed out that director Criss did a good job with limited resources, saying "with her at the helm it's become all it can be". Reviews by Amos was impressed with Criss' directing, saying she "handles the whole thing with great skill and directed the entire film beautifully". He also praised the talented acting, the cinematography, and a "story that captures the viewer from the first frame". The Dutch LGBT Cinemagazine said some of the scenes were bland, but actors Montgomery and Moretti were "convincing and serious in their roles". They noted that technical details, like the sound and picture quality were "somewhat disappointing", but they recommended the film because "the passion with which this film was made does come across".

== See also ==
- List of LGBT-related films of 2011
- List of LGBT-related films directed by women
