= Peccadillo Pictures =

UK film producer and distributor

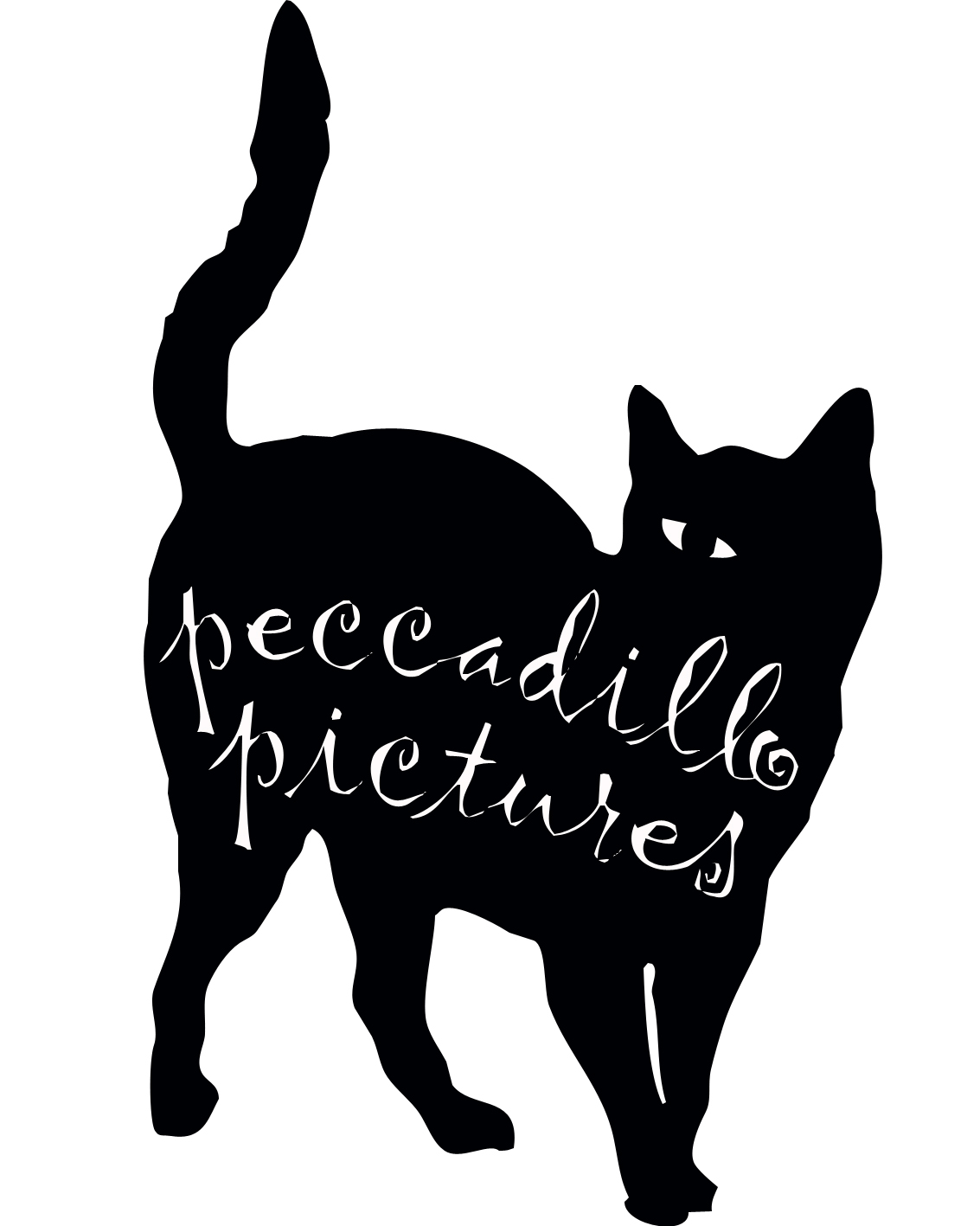
- Type: Private
- Industry: Film distributor
- Founded: London, UK (2000)
- Headquarters: Mount Pleasant, London, UK
- Key people: Tom Abell, Managing Director; Kahloon Loke, Managing Director
- Products: Peccadillo Pictures, Petit Péché, Bad Cat Pictures
- Website: peccadillo.film//

Peccadillo Pictures is a UK-based film producer and distributor of art house, gay and lesbian, independent and world cinema. They have provided distribution for many films such as Weekend, Tomboy, XXY, Eyes Wide Open, Four Minutes, The Blossoming of Maximo Oliveros, Transylvania, Cockles and Muscles, Summer Storm, The Guest House , Chemsex and Lesbian Space Princess.

== History ==
=== Overview ===
Peccadillo Pictures is a distributor of gay and lesbian, art house, and world cinema - including films from Europe, Latin America and Asia: Presque Rien and Wild Side (2004 film) both by Sèbastien Lifshitz (France), 15 by Royston Tan (Singapore), Summer Storm by Marco Kreuzpaintner (Germany), El Mar by Augusti Villaronga (Spain), A Year Without Love by Anahi Berneri (Argentina), and Blue Gate Crossing by Chih-Yen Yee (Taiwan).

In October 2006 it released Be With Me by Eric Khoo (Singapore), and in 2007, it released The Blossoming of Maximo Oliveros by Auraeus Solito (Philippines), Beyond Hatred by Olivier Meyrou (France) and Transylvania by Tony Gatlif (France) and 4:30 by Royston Tan (Singapore).

2008 saw its widest release schedule to date, with XXY by Lucia Puenzo (Argentina), Saxon by Greg Loftin (UK), Avril by Gérald Hustache-Mathieu (France) and Last of the Crazy People by Laurent Achard (France).

=== 2009 ===
In 2009 was released the first collection of DVD series Boys On Film.

=== 2010 ===
In 2010 Peccadillo Pictures will release a variety films such as Highly Strung (French title Je te mangerais) by Sophie Laloy, Give Me Your Hand (French title Donne-moi la main by Pascal-Alex Vincent), Eyes Wide Open by Haim Tabakman, and "Pornography: A Thriller" by David Kittredge as well as continuations of their short film compilations Boys on Film and Here Come the Girls including more mainstream actors such as Elliott Tittensor from Channel 4's Shameless.

=== 2011 ===
In 2011, the company's warehouse in Enfield was burnt down in the 2011 England riots. All their stock/catalogue/films were destroyed.

== The Boys on Film compilations ==
=== Boys on Film 1: Hard Love ===
Boys on Film 1 DVD cover

The compilation showcases ten short films and documentaries that deal with all aspects of modern gay life, created by various directors from around the world. These shorts tackle a wide range of contemporary topics: the pitfalls of online cruising, long distance lovers and growing old and gay gracefully.

- Summer - Dir. Hong Khaou
- Gay Zombie - Dir. Michael Simon
- Serene Hunter - Dir. Jason Bushman
- Le Weekend - Dir. Timothy Smith
- Cowboy Forever - Dir. Jean Baptiste Erreca
- Scarred - Dir. Damien Rea
- Packed Lunch - Dir. Tim Hunter
- Mirror, Mirror - Dir. John Winter
- VGL Hung! Dir. Max Barber

=== Boys on Film 2: In Too Deep ===
Boys on Film 2 DVD cover

The second installment included more award-winning gay cinema: Till Kleinert's award-winning Cowboy, Australian film Love Bites, Bramadero and Futures & Derivatives.

- Cowboy - Dir. Till Kleinert (Germany)
- Lucky Blue - Dir. Håkon Liu (Sweden)
- Weekend In The Countryside - Dir. Mathieu Salmon (France)
- Kali Ma - Dir. Soman Chainani (USA)
- Bramadero – Dir. Julián Hernández (Mexico)
- Love Bite - Dir. Craig Boreham (Australia)
- The Island - Dir. Trevor Anderson (Canada)
- Futures & Derivatives – Dir. Arthur Halpern (USA)
- Working it Out – Dir. Tim Hunter

=== Boys on Film 3: American Boy ===
Boys on Film 3 DVD cover

The third installment of Boys on Film features films from the United States, including In The Closet featuring porn star turned actor Brent Corrigan.

- Dare – Dir. Adam Salky (16 mins)
- In The Closet – Dir. Jody Wheeler (14 mins)
- Area X – Dir. Dennis Shinners (15 mins)
- The Young and Evil – Dir. Julian Breece (15 mins)
- Dish :) – Dir. Brian Krinsky (15 mins)
- Bugcrush – Dir. Carter Smith (36 mins)
- Astoria, Queens – Dir. Kyle Coker (22 mins)

== The Here Come the Girls compilation ==
=== Here Come the Girls 1 ===
Here Come the Girls DVD cover

Following the Boys on Film compilations, in 2009 Peccadillo Pictures released their first lesbian themed shorts compilation. It featured many award-winning films from acclaimed writers/filmmakers Guinevere Turner (The L Word, Itty Bitty Titty Committee, American Psycho) and Roberta Munroe (How Not To Make A Short Film), actresses Nathalie Toriel (Finn's Girl) and Lucy Liemann (Moving Wallpaper, Reggie Perrin) and British performance artists Bird La Bird, Dyke Marilyn and Split Britches.

- Wicked Desire - Dir. Angela Cheng (US) 13 mins
- Below the Belt - Dir. Laurie Colbert, Dominique Cardona (Canada) 13 mins
- Congratulations Daisy Graham - Dir. Cassandra Nicolaou (Canada) 15 mins
- Dani and Alice – Dir. Roberta Munroe (US) 11 mins
- A Soft Place – Dir. Suzanne Guacci (US) 10 mins
- Private Life - Dir. Abbe Robinson (UK) 15 mins
- Fem - Dir. Inge 'Campbell' Blackman (UK) 10 mins
- Happy Birthday - Dir. Roberta Munroe (US) 15 mins
- Late – Dir. Guinevere Turner (US) 7 mins
