= The Naughty List of Mr. Scrooge =

2024 American horror film

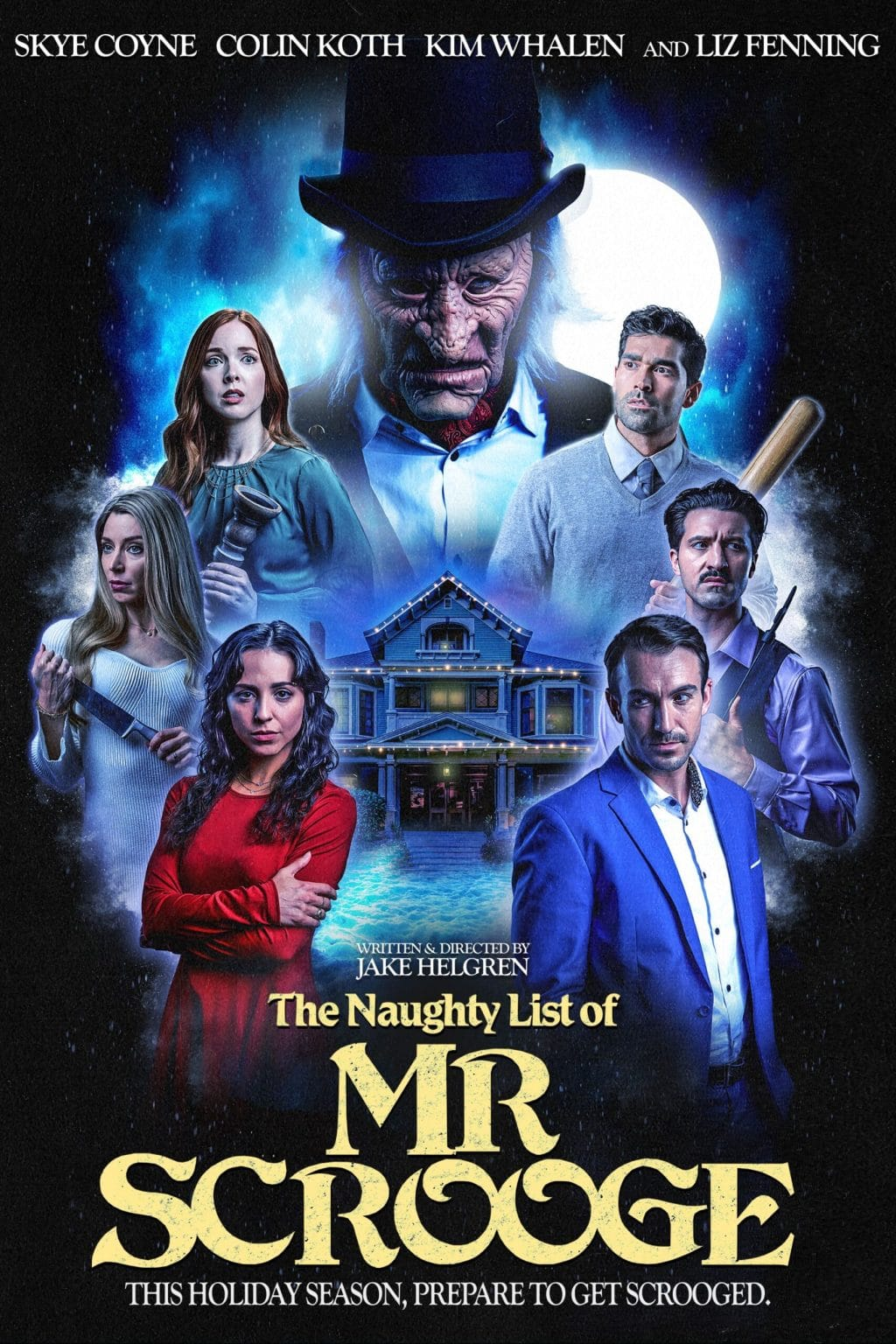
- Directed by: Jake Helgren
- Written by: Jake Helgren
- Produced by: Jake Helgren; Autumn Federici; James R. Black
- Starring: Skye Coyne; Colin Koth; Kim Whalen; Liz Fenning
- Cinematography: Horacio Martinez
- Edited by: Danny Draven
- Music by: Jojo Draven
- Production company: The Ninth House
- Distributed by: Terror Films
- Release date: December 20, 2024
- Running time: 89 minutes
- Country: United States
- Language: English

The Naughty List of Mr. Scrooge is a 2024 American horror slasher film written and directed by Jake Helgren. The film stars Skye Coyne, Colin Koth, Kim Whalen, Liz Fenning, Adam Bucci, Ali Zahiri and Coél Mahal.

== Premise ==
A group of former college friends gather for a reunion at a winter chalet fifteen years after one of their own dies during their production of A Christmas Carol. The group then finds themselves being stalked and killed off one by one by someone dressed as a terrifying vision of Ebenezer Scrooge.

== Cast ==
- Skye Coyne as Tabby Banks
- Colin Koth as Jonny Rose
- Kim Whalen as Kelsey Kline
- Liz Fenning as Chandler Crisp
- Adam Bucci as Tucker Posey
- Ali Zahiri as Julian Cortez
- Coél Mahal as Franny Lang
- Benedikt Sebastian as Marty
- Christina DeRosa as Roma
- Shani Marq as Lori
- Nicolas James Wilson as Teddy

== Production ==
The film was shot with vintage anamorphic lenses.

== Release ==
The film was released in the United States on December 20, 2024 across multiple VoD outlets, including The ROKU Channel and TUBI.
