= Jake Helgren =

American film director

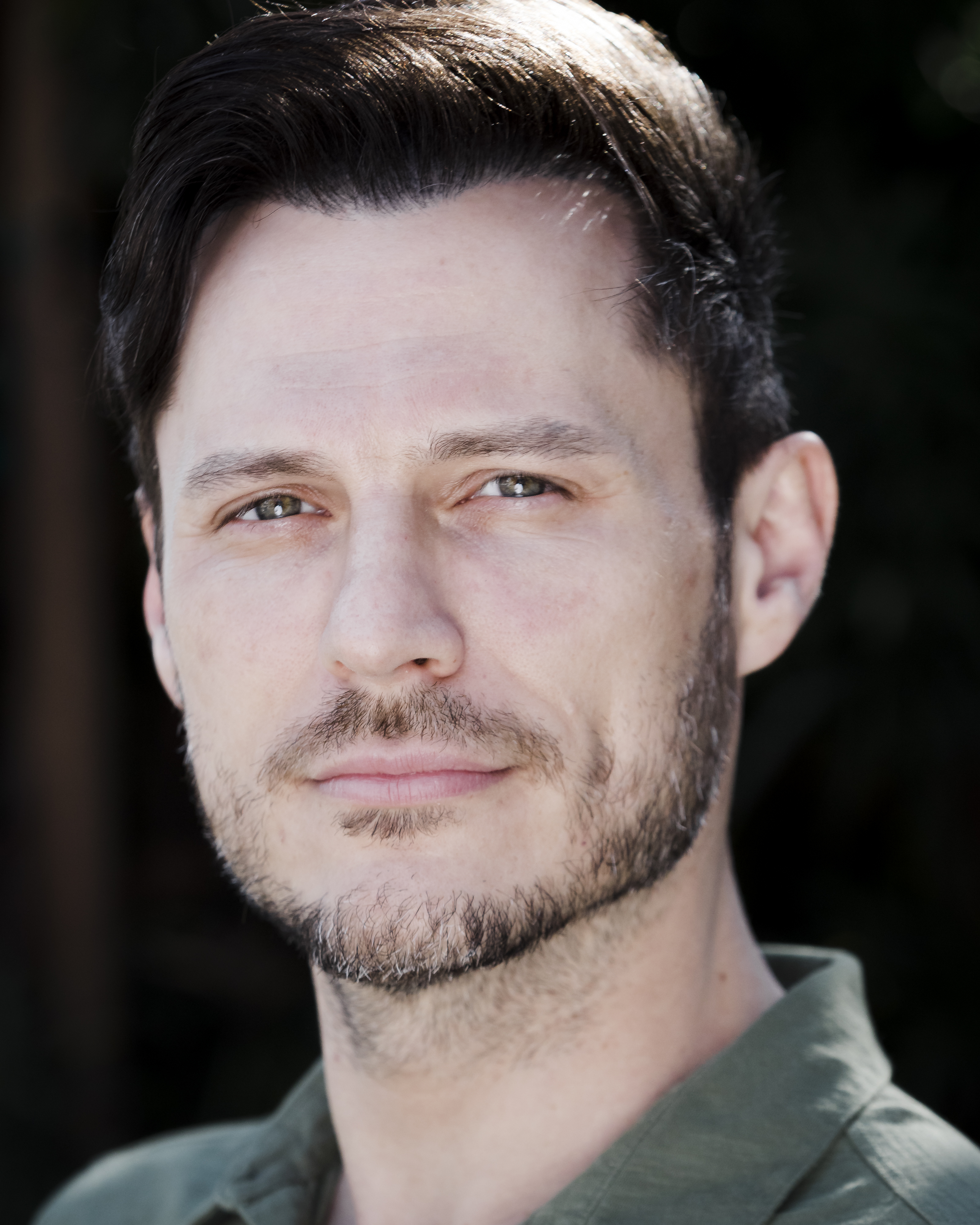
- Jake Helgren in 2023
- Born: Jacob Helgren; November 28, 1981 (age 44); Elgin, Texas, United States
- Occupation: Filmmaker
- Notable work: Dashing in December (2020); The Naughty List of Mr. Scrooge (2024)

Jake Helgren (born November 28, 1981, in Elgin, Texas) is an American film producer, director and screenwriter.

Helgren studied creative writing at St. Edward's University in Austin, Texas.

Helgren has thrice been nominated for GLAAD Media Awards: in 2020 for Dashing in December as Outstanding TV Movie or Limited Series, in 2023 for A Christmas to Treasure in the renamed category Outstanding Film – Streaming or TV, and in 2024 for The Holiday Exchange in the same category.

Helgren is gay; about Dashing in December, he said he wrote and directed the film as an Americana romance and a "love letter to the ending" he wanted in Brokeback Mountain.

== Selected filmography ==
- A Carpenter Christmas Romance (2024)
- The Naughty List of Mr. Scrooge (2024)
- The Holiday Exchange (2023)
- A Cowboy Christmas Romance (2023)
- Bad Connection (2023)
- The Holiday Proposal Plan (2023)
- A Christmas to Treasure (2022)
- Dashing in December (2020)
- Nightmare Nurse (2016)
- Finding Mr. Wright (2011)
