= Michael Akers =

American film director (born 1970)

- Born: Michael D. Ackers Jr. September 5, 1970 (age 55); Ephrata, Pennsylvania
- Occupations: filmmaker, film director, screenwriter, film editor
- Website: United Gay Network

Michael D. Akers (born September 5, 1970, in Ephrata, Pennsylvania) is an American film director, producer, screenwriter and film editor. In 2000, he founded "United Gay Network" (UGN) with his longtime partner, Sandon Berg. Most of his films are LGBT-related.

== Career ==
Michael D. Akers studied at Indiana University of Pennsylvania before moving to Los Angeles to begin a career in the entertainment industry as production assistant and assistant director to work on the cable movie Jurassic Women (1996). For three years, he worked with Turner Feature Animation on Cats Don't Dance helping to research and develop animated features. Then he moved to Grand Productions, and later produced at least two episodes of the Lifetime series Intimate Portraits. These included the "Intimate Portraits" of Heather Locklear and Jane Seymour. He became executive assistant to Martin Short on The Martin Short Show and a story and research assistant to Ryan Seacrest's NBC's Saturday Night at the Movies and Anne Robinson's The Weakest Link.

Establishing United Gay Network, he moved to independent film making. In March 2002, Michael D. Akers directing his short B&W w/Splash of Clown in partnership with Sandon Berg. His debut long feature film Gone But Not Forgotten, a script he had begun writing back in 1995 while working for another film production company, premiered at the 9th Annual Philadelphia International Gay and Lesbian Film Festival. It was followed by Matrimonium, an improv film about a reality show trying to marry two men for ratings. Phoenix is a symbolic and lyrical film examining why relationships end the way that they do. It focuses on a young man who goes to Phoenix, Arizona to surprise his lover, only to discover his lover's secret other life. Morgan is about a paraplegic man putting his life back together after a bicycle racing accident leaves his paralyzed.

In Gone, But Not Forgotten he was credited as Michael D. Akers. But in all later movies, he used Michael Akers (dropping the middle "D").

United Gay Network is a production house founded by Michael D. Akers and Sandon Berg. Akers has released his films through the company.

United Gay Network aimed to bring gay cinema closer to mainstream cinema. As Berg stated in a radio interview, he and Akers were striving to create stories that would crossover to a broader audience.

Regarding the production of Morgan, Berg said: "I think Morgan is a very universal story. I don't think it is gay-specific at all." Morgan is the story of a gay and paralyzed young athlete that defies stereotypes and pushes through boundaries. The lead character, a young athlete, named Morgan Oliver, is first seen wallowing in a state of depression, drowning his sorrows in beer as he watches bicycle racing (the sport that at once defined his sense of purpose and drove him to his catalytic accident) on television.

UGN's first long feature film, Gone, But Not Forgotten, was considered to have set the pace for normalizing the portrayal of gay people in cinema.

== Personal life ==
Akers is gay. His long-term partner is Sandon Berg. They have been together since the late 1990s.

== Filmography ==
=== Director ===
- 2003: Gone, But Not Forgotten
- 2005: Matrimonium
- 2006: Phoenix
- 2012: Morgan

Others

- 2011: The Friends Project of David Raleigh with Alan Cumming, Ari Gold, and Billy Porter to benefit the Ali Forney Center

=== Producer ===
- 2003: Gone, But Not Forgotten
- 2005: Matrimonium
- 2012: Morgan

=== Writer ===
- 2003: Gone, But Not Forgotten
- 2005: Matrimonium
- 2006: Phoenix
- 2012: Morgan

=== Editor ===
- 2003: Gone, But Not Forgotten
- 2005: Matrimonium
- 2005: Flirting with Anthony
- 2006: Phoenix
- 2006: Love Life
- 2010: Going Maverick: The Sarah Palin Story (video short)
- 2011: The Friends Project of David Raleigh with Alan Cumming, Ari Gold, and Billy Porter to benefit the Ali Forney Center
- 2012: Morgan
