= Matrimonium =

- Theatrical release poster
- Directed by: Michael Akers
- Screenplay by: Michael D. Akers; Sandon Berg
- Produced by: Michael D. Akers; Sandon Berg; Alexander Chauvin (co-producer)
- Starring: Rick Federman; Sandon Berg
- Cinematography: Alexander Yellen
- Edited by: Michael D. Akers
- Music by: Aram Mandossian
- Distributed by: United Gay Network
- Release date: 2005
- Running time: 88 min.
- Country: United States
- Language: English

Matrimonium is a 2005 comedy film directed by Michael Akers, his second feature film after the successful Gone, But Not Forgotten. Co-written and co-produced by him and Sandon Berg, the latter appears in a lead role in the film as Spencer who is having a sham same-sex marriage with the straight character Rick Federman in the role of Malcolm to enable the latter to win the 1-million dollar prize on the nationally broadcast reality television show Matrimonium.

The film was featured in Blood Moon's Guide to Gay & Lesbian Film, by Darwin Porter and Danforth Prince and published by Blood Moon Productions in 2006. In that book, Matrimonium is called a "hilarious spoof on reality television."

== Synopsis ==
Malcolm Caufield (Rick Federman), a straight guy decides to go on a reality show called "Matrimonium" for a chance to win a million dollars. The sum comes handy after his allowance was cut off by his family. The reality show however has put a twist. Malcolm has to put a charade that he has suddenly turned "gay" and in a spoof arranged by the TV hostess (Deven Green), he is marrying the very gay Spencer Finch (Sandon Berg). All he has to do to win the prize is to convince his family (Bruce Cronander & Sondra Thieret) to attend the nationally televised same-sex wedding of their "now gay" son. Can Malcolm convince them and what are his true feelings towards his supposed TV scam partner and "lover"?

== Cast ==
- Rick Federman as Malcolm Caufield
- Sandon Berg as Spencer Finch
- Dotty Carey as Loretta Finch Hunt
- Courtney Donnelly as Barbie Finch
- Mandy Kaplan as Clarissa Cobb
- Joel Bryant as Bradley DuBois
- Bruce Cronander as Hugh Caufield
- Sondra Thieret as Hugh's wife/Malcolm's mother
- Deven Green as Andre Genous - hostess
- Theron Hatch as Exotic male dancer

== Screenings ==
The film showed at a number of film festivals as an official selection:

- North Carolina International Film Festival
- Philadelphia Gay & Lesbian Film Festival
- Long Island Reeling LGBT Film Festival
