= On the End =

2026 film by Ari Selinger

- Film poster
- Directed by: Ari Selinger
- Written by: Ari Selinger
- Produced by: Raven Jensen; Jason Beekman; Harris Gurny; Matthew Heymann
- Starring: Tim Blake Nelson; Mireille Enos; James Badge Dale; Desmin Borges; Matthew Maher; Glenn Fleshler; Michelle Hurd; Marcia DeBonis; Sawyer Spielberg; Negin Farsad; Anna Chlumsky; Lois Smith
- Cinematography: Conor Murphy
- Edited by: Hanna Park
- Music by: Eitan Selinger
- Production companies: Moontown Productions; Wise Child Studios; Red Barn Films
- Release date: October 4, 2025 (Hamptons International Film Festival)
- Running time: 115 minutes
- Country: United States
- Language: English

On the End is a 2025 American drama film written and directed by Ari Selinger in his feature directorial debut. The film stars Tim Blake Nelson, Mireille Enos, James Badge Dale, Anna Chlumsky and Lois Smith. Based on true events that garnered national attention, the film tells the story of a Montauk mechanic and his girlfriend who fight against gentrification and real estate interests threatening their home and business. Jared Hess and Jerusha Hess serve as executive producers.

The film had its world premiere at the Hamptons International Film Festival on October 4, 2025.

== Premise ==
Tom, a curmudgeonly Montauk mechanic, unexpectedly finds love online with Freckles, a diabetic outcast. Their newfound happiness comes under threat when Tom's lucrative beachfront property and auto repair shop becomes the target of an unscrupulous real estate agent. As the gentrified community turns against Tom, viewing him as lowering their property values, he and Freckles must fight back against the power, greed, and corruption of their changing community.

== Cast ==
- Tim Blake Nelson as Tom Ferreira, a down-on-his-luck Montauk mechanic
- Mireille Enos as Freckles, Tom's diabetic girlfriend
- James Badge Dale as John Finch
- Lois Smith as Trudie Ferreira
- Anna Chlumsky as Jess Finch
- Desmin Borges as Austin Imlay
- Matthew Maher as Milton Ferreira
- Glenn Fleshler as Ray Meely
- Michelle Hurd as Violetta Chamberlin
- Sawyer Spielberg as Brent Sherman
- Marcia DeBonis as Judge Malfo
- David Walker as Braedon

== Production ==
=== Development ===
Writer-director Ari Selinger first met mechanic Tom Ferreira and his girlfriend Freckles (Cathy Anne Tobin) in 2011 outside Ferreira's Montauk beachside shop while shooting his NYU thesis film. Ferreira's real-life story became the foundation for Selinger's debut feature. In a statement, Selinger explained, "Little did I know his life would become the blueprint for On the End, a real-life fable set in a hidden corner of the Hamptons. Although it begins in 2008, the film explores issues of class disparity and gentrification that resonate just as powerfully today. At its core, though, it's a raw and poignant love story."

The film is based on the true story of Thomas Ferreira, a Montauk mechanic whose family had lived on Navy Road since 1946. Ferreira operated an auto repair business from his home on Fort Pond Bay, which he moved to the property after his previous landlord, actor Ralph Macchio, raised the rent on his shop. For nearly a decade, Ferreira accumulated vehicles and auto parts in his yard, which neighbors claimed was a safety hazard.

In 2009, East Hampton Town officials hired a carting company and removed the contents of Ferreira's yard, including his tools and equipment, later billing him $20,000 for the removal. Ferreira filed a $55 million federal civil rights lawsuit, arguing that town officials had improperly employed emergency health and safety laws in a conspiracy to clean his yard and enhance neighboring property values. The case went to trial in Federal District Court in Central Islip in 2016. Ferreira ultimately won the case, with the town settling for $150,000.

Ferreira died in 2024, and his girlfriend Tobin died in 2017 from complications of Type 1 diabetes at age 47.

=== Filming ===
Production wrapped in Montauk, New York, with filming taking place on Navy Road, two doors down from Ferreira's actual property. The production used a town-owned house slated for demolition as the primary filming location. Ferreira, who was ill during production, watched the filming from his porch.

== Release ==
On the End had its world premiere at the Hamptons International Film Festival on October 4, 2025. The film was selected for Industry Selects at the 2025 Toronto International Film Festival, a curated selection of films available for worldwide acquisition.
