= Leo Minaya =

American film actor

Leo L. Minaya is an American film actor. He acquired recognition from his role in the Sundance mega hit Manito (when he was only seventeen) and as America Ferrera's love interest, Sal, in How the Garcia Girls Spent Their Summer. His first starring role came in the form of gay paraplegic Morgan Oliver in the 2012 film Morgan directed by Michael Akers. In addition to being his first starring performance, it was also his first time playing a gay character.

== Biography ==
Apparently born on an airplane, Lisandro "Leo" Minaya grew up with his mother and four siblings in Washington Heights, Manhattan. He wrote, directed, and produced his first play in fifth grade. His first acting jobs were school plays, starting in middle school, by which time he says he decided to become a professional actor.

== Filmography ==
- From an Objective Point of View (2002)
- Manito (2003) ... Manny Moreno
- How the Garcia Girls Spent Their Summer (2008) ... Sal
- Morgan (2012) ... Morgan Oliver
