= DriverX =

- Directed by: Henry Barrial
- Written by: Henry Barrial
- Produced by: Mark Stolaroff
- Starring: Patrick Fabian
- Cinematography: Daniel Lynn
- Edited by: Eric Strand
- Music by: Lili Haydn
- Production company: Antic Films
- Distributed by: Sundance Selects
- Release dates: 11 October 2017 (Tacoma Film Festival); 30 November 2018 (US)
- Running time: 98 minutes
- Country: United States
- Language: English

DriverX is a 2017 American drama film directed by Henry Barrial, starring Patrick Fabian.

== Cast ==
- Patrick Fabian as Leonard Moore
- Tanya Clarke as Dawn Moore
- Desmin Borges as Tom
- Travis Schuldt as Harry
- Melissa Fumero as Jessica
- Oscar Nunez as Julio
- Nina Seničar as Nina
- Max Gail as Danny
- Iqbal Theba as Distinguished Man
- Randall Batinkoff as Ryan
- Heather Ankeny as Jackie

== Release ==
The film was first shown at the Tacoma Film Festival on 11 October 2017, then released in theatres on 30 November 2018.

== Reception ==
Dan Buffa of KSDK wrote that the film "shines a much-needed light on a profession that's not as easy as it looks" and is "far more interesting" than he initially thought it would be. Ben Kenigsberg of The New York Times wrote that while the film is "not perfect" and features "one wild night too many", its outlook "lingers". Noel Murray of the Los Angeles Times wrote that while the film is a "little reductive when it comes to the generation gap", the performances are "excellent" and Barrial "isn’t playing Leonard’s predicament for cheap laughs or amped-up drama".

Frank Scheck of The Hollywood Reporter wrote that the film "has the style but not the substance of a strong ’70s indie drama, stalls out quickly and goes nowhere interesting." Nick Allen of RogerEbert.com gave the film a "thumbs down" and wrote that it is "selling a lifestyle of working for billion-dollar rideshare companies, masquerading as a light-hearted indie when it has the soul of a commercial."
