= Saundra Santiago =

American actress

- Born: April 13, 1957 (age 69); The Bronx, New York, U.S.
- Education: University of Miami (BA); Southern Methodist University (MFA)
- Occupation: Actress
- Years active: 1979–present
- Spouse: Roger Squitero (m. 1999)

Saundra Santiago (born April 13, 1957) is an American actress. She is best known for her role as Detective Gina Calabrese in the NBC original crime drama series Miami Vice (1984–1990). She also played Carmen Santos on the CBS soap opera Guiding Light and the second Carlotta Vega on the ABC soap opera One Life to Live.

== Early life ==
Santiago is the daughter of a Cuban father and a Puerto Rican mother. Raised in the South Bronx, New York City, she attended Our Lady of Victory Grammar School. When she was 13 years old, her family moved to Homestead, Florida.

Santiago graduated from South Dade Senior High School and attended the University of Miami on a scholarship, majoring in psychology. As a University of Miami student, she became interested in acting. After graduation, she went on to postgraduate study in theater and arts at Southern Methodist University, eventually earning a Master of Fine Arts degree. Santiago joined the company of regional summer stock theater Timber Lake Playhouse, Mount Carroll, Illinois, performing many roles, including Maria in West Side Story in the 1980 season.

== Career ==
In 1984, Santiago made her big-screen debut appearing in the dance drama film Beat Street, and later that year began starring in the NBC crime drama series Miami Vice, playing the role of Detective Gina Calabrese opposite Don Johnson. The series ran for five seasons. In the 1990s, Santiago appeared in a number of made-for-television movies, including The Cosby Mysteries (1994) and To Sir, with Love II (1996) opposite Sidney Poitier.

In 1999, Santiago joined the cast of the long-running CBS soap opera Guiding Light, playing crime boss Carmen Santos. She received a Daytime Emmy Award nomination for America's Favorite Villain in 2002. She left the soap after three years. She appeared simultaneously in a recurring role on The Sopranos as Tony Soprano's next-door neighbor, Jeannie Cusamano, and as her twin sister Joan, from 1999 to 2007. Additionally, on television, Santiago guest-starred on Law & Order in the 1992 episode "Prince of Darkness" (episode 3.8) and in the 2004 episode "Veteran's Day" (episode 14.15).

In 2004, Santiago joined the cast of the ABC soap opera One Life to Live in the role of Isabella Santi/Angelina Parades after leaving Guiding Light. In 2007, she played a recurring role in the first season of the FX legal thriller Damages. In 2009, she returned to One Life to Live, this time taking over the role of Carlotta Vega from Patricia Mauceri. She remained with the show until 2011. In 2014, she returned to prime-time television, playing the role of Marciela Acosta, the wife of gang leader Javier Acosta, in the short-lived Fox drama series Gang Related. Santiago also guest-starred on Person of Interest, True Detective, Gotham, Blue Bloods, and Madam Secretary.

== Personal life ==
Santiago met jazz musician Roger Squitero in 1994, whom she married in 1999.

== Filmography ==
=== Film ===
Year	Title	Role	Notes
1981	The End of August	Mariequita	
1984	Beat Street	Carmen Cararro	
1993	Carlito's Way	Club Patron Dancing with Carlito	
1997	Nick and Jane	Stephanie	
1998	Hi-Life	Elena	
2002	Garmento	Franca Fortuna	
2006	The Promise	Lourdes	Short
2009	Bruja	Lorraine	Short
2013	The House That Jack Built	Martha	
2023	Rare Objects	Aymee Parla	

=== Television ===
Year	Title	Role	Notes
1979	¿Qué Pasa, USA?	Lisa	Season 3 Episode 8: "Patria and Company"
1984–1989	Miami Vice	Detective Gina Calabrese	Main cast (111 episodes)
1992	ABC Afterschool Special	Jean Hodge	Season 20 Episode 4: "Summer Stories: The Mall - Part 3"
1992	Law & Order	Sandra Alvaro	Season 3 Episode 8: "Prince of Darkness"
1993	With Hostile Intent	Sergeant Lucille Preston	TV movie
1994	The Cosby Mysteries	Amy Flusser	TV movie
1995	New York Undercover	Juanita	Season 1 Episode 23: "The Shooter"
1995	Deadline for Murder: From the Files of Edna Buchanan	Rosinha Zulueta	TV movie
1996	To Sir, with Love II	Louisa Rodgriguez	TV movie
1999–2003	Guiding Light	Carmen Santos	25 episodes ALMA Award for Outstanding Actress in a Daytime Drama (2001); Nominated – ALMA Award for Outstanding Actress in a Daytime Drama (2000, 2002); Nominated – Daytime Emmy Award for America's Favorite Villain (2002)
1999–2007	The Sopranos	Jean and Joan Cusamano	5 episodes
2004	Law & Order	Mariela Silva	Season 14 Episode 15: "Veteran's Day"
2007	Damages	Karen Gonzales	5 episodes
2008	Cashmere Mafia	Dr. Jane	Season 1 Episode 6: "Yours, Mine and Hers"
2009	The Unusuals	Melanie Trumble	Season 1 Episode 4: "Crime Slut"
2009–2011	One Life to Live	Carlotta Vega	13 episodes
2011	Person of Interest	Patti D'Agostino	Season 1 Episode 7: "Witness"
2013	Meddling Mom	Valeria	TV movie
2014	Gang Related	Marciela Acosta	5 episodes
2015	The Following	Mrs. Miller	Season 3 Episode 1: "New Blood"
2015	True Detective	Irma	Season 2 Episode 5: "Other Lives"
2015	Gotham	Janice Caulfield	Season 2 Episode 4: "Rise of the Villains: Strike Force"
2016	Blue Bloods	Carmen Baez	Season 6 Episode 13: "Stomping Grounds"
2017	Snowfall	Mariela	Season 1 Episode 10: "The Rubicon"
2017	Madam Secretary	Margarita Garcia	Season 4 Episode 10: "Women Transform the World"
2020	Hightown	Beatriz	Season 1 Episode 4: "B.F.O."
2021	Sand Dollar Cove	Anna Walters	TV movie
