= Sandon Berg =

American film producer

- Born: July 15, 1971 (age 55)
- Occupations: Filmmaker, film producer, screenwriter, film actor
- Partner: Michael D. Akers
- Website: United Gay Network

Sandon Berg (born July 15, 1971) is an American film producer and screenwriter, and actor with past roles in both film and television. He co-founded United Gay Network, a film production company, with his longtime partner, Michael D. Akers.

== Biography ==
Raised in Huntsville, Alabama, he finished high school there in 1989. He then attended Florida State University, Tallahassee, where he earned a BFA. He moved to Los Angeles to work in the entertainment industry. Over the years, he worked in various film production jobs and even starred in several leading brand commercials. He had met Michael Akers in 1998 and the two began writing and producing films together, with Akers also directing and editing. United Gay Network was fully established in 2002 and its first long feature film was Gone, But Not Forgotten, a groundbreaking gay film that explores the question of sexuality as a choice.

=== Personal life ===
Berg lives with his partner, Akers in New York City. They met for the first time on a blind date in the late 1990s.

== United Gay Network ==
United Gay Network is a production house founded by Akers and Berg. Akers and Berg release their films through the company. In forming United Gay Network ten years ago, the longtime partners aspired not only to promote the genre of "gay films" but also tried to bring gay cinema closer to mainstream cinema. As Berg stated in a radio interview, he and Akers strive to create stories that would crossover to a broader audience. Nowhere is this more apparent than in their latest production Morgan. Morgan achieves a depth that even exceeds UGN's first long feature film, Gone, But Not Forgotten, itself considered groundbreaking and to have set the pace for normalizing the portrayal of gay people in cinema.

== Filmography ==
=== Actor ===
- Gone, But Not Forgotten (2003) ... Towey (Cameo)
- Matrimonium (2005) ... Spencer

=== Producer ===
- Gone, But Not Forgotten
- Matrimonium
- Flirting with Anthony (2005)
- Phoenix (2006)
- Morgan (2012)

=== Writer ===
- Gone, But Not Forgotten
- Matrimonium
- Phoenix
- Morgan
