= Desmin Borges =

American actor (born 1983/1984)

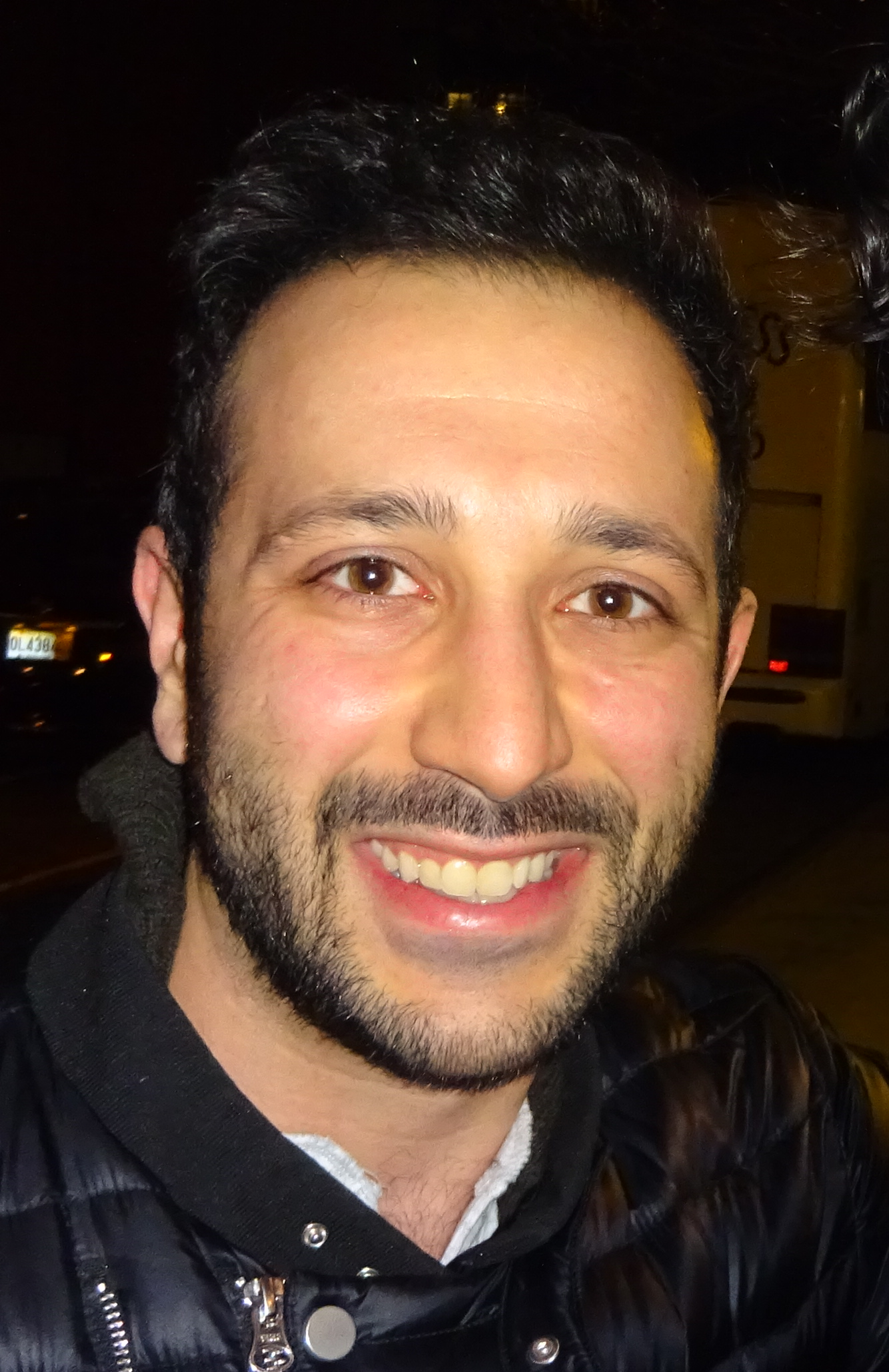
- Born: 1983 or 1984 (age 42–43); Chicago, Illinois, U.S.
- Occupation: Actor
- Years active: 2008–present

Desmin Borges (born 1983/1984) is an American actor. He is best known for playing Edgar Quintero on the FX/FXX comedy-drama You're the Worst.

== Early life ==
Borges grew up in Chicago and received his Bachelor of Fine Arts in Theater at DePaul University. As of 2016, Borges was living in New York City. His father is from Puerto Rico and his mother is of Italian and Greek ancestry.

== Filmography ==
Film
Year	Title	Role	Notes
2010	Cherry	Joey	
2011	Mr. Popper's Penguins	Daryl	
2011	Tower Heist	Modell's Sneaker Salesman	
2012	Compliance	Officer Morris	
2013	The House That Jack Built	Manny	
2014	The Mend	Benin	
2014	Gabriel	Rudy	
2015	Open Tables	Jon Evans	
2016	Carrie Pilby	Douglas	
2017	DriverX	Tom	
2018	Private Life	Sam	
2022	Shotgun Wedding	Ricky	
2024	On the End	Austin	
2025	Oh, Hi!	Joe	
2025	Valiant One	Josh Weaver	

Television
Year	Title	Role	Notes
2011	Law & Order: Special Victims Unit	Luis Cordova/Diego Ramirez	Episode: “Blood Brothers”
2011–2013	The Good Wife	Tommy Diehaus/Mark D'Amico	Episodes: “Getting Off” (2011), “Everything Is Ending” (2013)
2012	Switched at Birth	Tamale Guy	Episode: “Starry Night”
2012	Castle	Pablo Barnes	Episode: “Til Death Do Us Part”
2012	A Gifted Man	Eduardo Sanchez	Episode: “In Case of Complications”
2013	Next Caller	Derek	4 episodes (unaired)
2013	Murder in Manhattan	Orlando	TV movie
2014	Unforgettable	Troy	Episode: “The Combination”
2014–2019	You're the Worst	Edgar Quintero	Main cast, 62 episodes
2014	The Mysteries of Laura	Eddie Fainlen	Episode: “The Mystery of the Biker Bar”
2016	Preacher	Carlos	2 episodes
2016	Divorce	Officer Walker	Episode: “Pilot”
2017	Bull	Reed Kenworthy	Episode: "Make Me"
2017	The Guest Book		Episode: “Story 3”
2018	Madam Secretary	Miguel Briseño	Episode: "The Fourth Estate"
2019	Living with Yourself	Dan	Recurring role
2020	Grace and Frankie	Joshy Steinmetz	Episode: "The Arraignment"
2020	Utopia	Wilson Wilson	Main cast, 8 episodes
2022	The Time Traveler's Wife	Gomez	6 episodes
2022	Welcome to Flatch	Jimmy Jameson	6 episodes
2024	Only Murders in the Building	Alfonso	3 episodes
