= Boorman and the Devil =

2025 documentary film

- Film poster
- Directed by: David Kittredge
- Written by: David Kittredge
- Produced by: Jim Fall; David Kittredge; Travis Stevens
- Edited by: David Kittredge
- Music by: Eduardo Daniel Victoria
- Production company: Triple Fire Productions
- Distributed by: Yellow Veil Pictures
- Release dates: September 1, 2025 (Venice); August 28, 2026 (New York City)
- Running time: 112 minutes
- Country: United States
- Language: English
- Box office: $27,501

Boorman and the Devil is a 2025 American documentary film written, directed, produced, and edited by David Kittredge, chronicling the making, themes, and reception of the 1977 horror film Exorcist II: The Heretic, which almost ended the career of its director John Boorman and was panned on release as one of the worst films ever made.

After premiering at the 82nd Venice International Film Festival on September 1, 2025, the film received a limited theatrical released on August 28, 2026, before its release on streaming platforms the following September 22. Boorman and the Devil received very positive reviews, with praise for its deep dive into the film's ambitions and chaotic production.

== Release ==
The film premiered at the 82nd Venice International Film Festival in September 2025. It was released at the Quad Cinema in New York City on August 28, 2026, and expanded to other cities like Los Angeles on September 4. The film was released on streaming platforms for home viewing on September 22, 2026.

== Reception ==
On the review aggregator website Rotten Tomatoes, 98% of 64 critics' reviews are positive, with an average rating of 8.2/10. The website's consensus reads: "A fascinating, candid testament to the passionate excesses of 1970s filmmaking, Boorman and the Devil delivers a lively and funny autopsy of one of Hollywood's most infamous failures." Metacritic, which uses a weighted average, assigned the film a score of 79 out of 100, based on 13 critics, indicating "generally favorable" reviews.

In a positive review, Jordan Mintzer of The Hollywood Reporter wrote, "Whatever your take, the crazy story behind Exorcist II: The Heretic is ultimately one of nostalgia — for a time when ambitious filmmakers like Boorman could go to Hollywood and commit 'the sin of hubris,' and then go to hell for it." Alison Foreman of IndieWire gave the film a B+, writing, "David Kittredge delivers a dazzling reflection on the career of John Boorman in the documentary Boorman and the Devil, a robust reframing of the legendary director's Exorcist II: The Heretic, as strange and poetic as the disastrous 1977 production itself." Daniel Kurland of Bloody Disgusting was also positive, writing, "Boorman and the Devil is absolutely everything that you'd want from an Exorcist II deep dive reclamation. Kittredge's thorough exploration of this title is evident, and compelling information is put together in an impressive, comprehensive package that avoids many of the standard talking head documentary pitfalls. It's also surprisingly funny."
