= Billy Porter =

American actor and singer (born 1969)

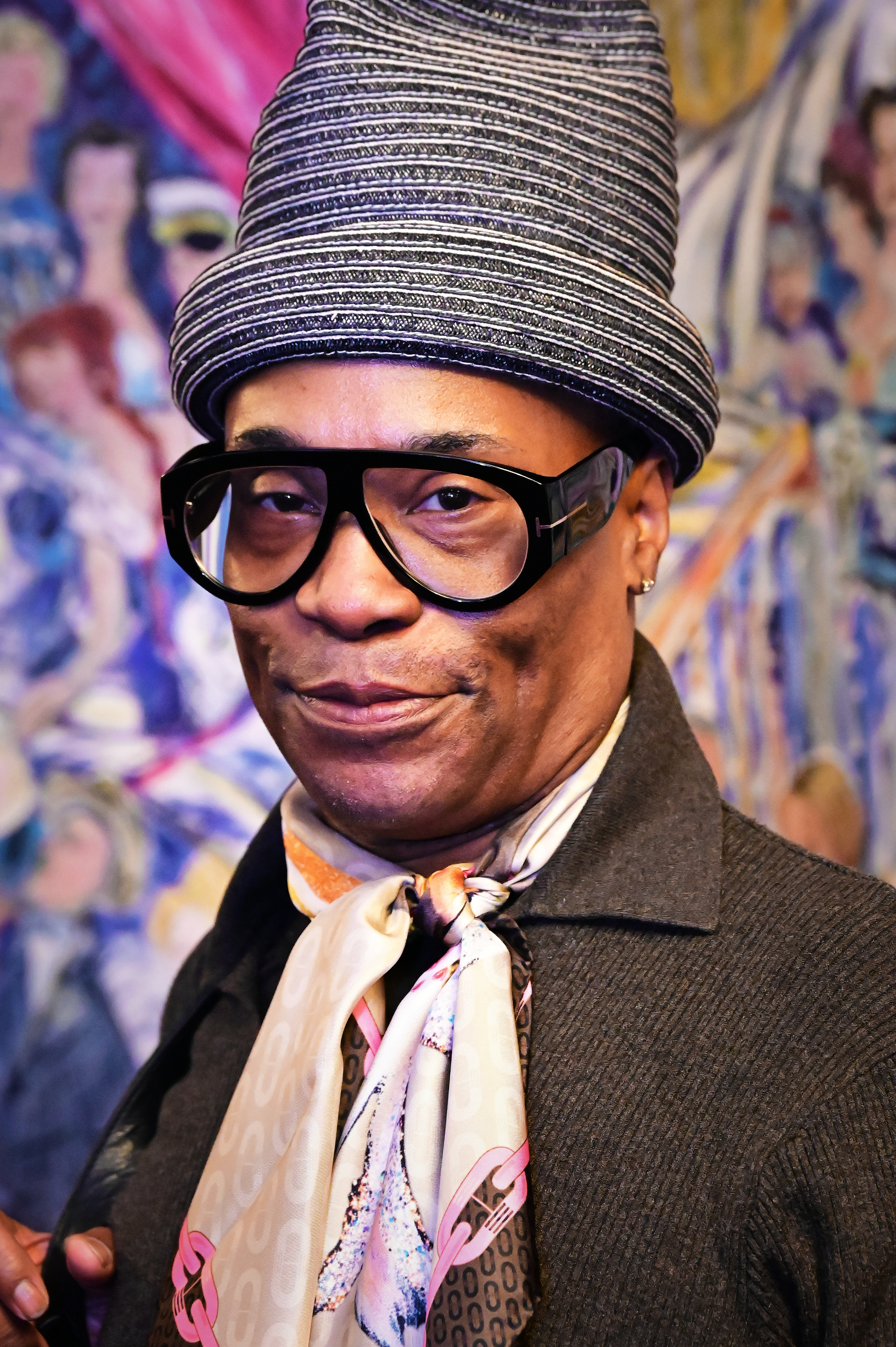
- Porter in 2026
- Born: William Ellis Porter II; September 21, 1969 (age 57); Pittsburgh, Pennsylvania, U.S.
- Education: Carnegie Mellon University (BFA); University of California, Los Angeles (GrDip)
- Occupations: Actor; singer; writer
- Years active: 1992–present
- Spouse: Adam Smith (m. 2017; sep. 2023)

William Ellis Porter II (born September 21, 1969) is an American singer, actor, writer, director and businessperson. He gained notice performing on Broadway before starting a solo career as a singer and actor. For his role as Lola in Kinky Boots, he won the 2013 Tony Award for Best Actor in a Musical, the Drama Desk Award for Outstanding Actor in a Musical and the Outer Critics Circle Award for Outstanding Actor in a Musical. He credits the part for "cracking open" his feminine side to confront toxic masculinity. He also won the 2014 Grammy Award for Best Musical Theater Album for the musical's accompanying album.

Porter starred in all three seasons of the television series Pose, for which he was nominated for three Golden Globe Awards and won the 2019 Primetime Emmy Award for Outstanding Lead Actor in a Drama Series, becoming the first gay black man to be nominated and win in any lead acting category at the Primetime Emmys. In 2020, he was included on Time's list of the 100 most influential people in the world. In 2022, he won another Tony Award for Best Musical as a producer for the musical A Strange Loop.

He made his directorial debut in 2022 with the romantic comedy film Anything's Possible. Porter received the Isabelle Stevenson Award at the 77th Tony Awards for his humanitarian work with the Elizabeth Taylor AIDS Foundation and Entertainment Community Fund.

== Early life and education ==
Porter was born on September 21, 1969, in Pittsburgh, Pennsylvania, to William Ellis Porter and Cloerinda Jean Johnson Porter Ford. His sister is Mary Martha E. Ford. He grew up in a "very religious" Pentecostal family and has described being sexually abused by his stepfather between the ages of 7 and 12.

He attended Reizenstein Middle School, before graduating from Allderdice High School in Pittsburgh and Pittsburgh Creative and Performing Arts School in 1987. During the summers of 1985 through 1987, Porter was a member of entertainment groups "Spirit" and "Flash," which performed daily at Kennywood, a Pittsburgh-area amusement park.

Although he was eager to move to New York City, one of Porter's high school teachers encouraged him to apply to Carnegie Mellon University. He credits his teachers as "angels in his life" for guiding him towards educational opportunities that prepared him for his career. Porter once reflected upon this decision:

It's about access. It's about opportunity. It's about knowledge. I lived a 12-minute drive from Carnegie Mellon University for my entire life and had no idea that it was one of the best drama schools in the world. How did I not know that? This is what we mean when we say it's not equal—it's not a level playing field. Had [my teacher] not said something, I would have moved to New York City unprepared and tanked. It was because of teachers, the angels in my life who saw me before I could even see myself, and said, "You're going over here. Just listen." And I knew enough to actually shut up and listen.

He graduated from the College of Fine Arts at Carnegie Mellon University with a Bachelor of Fine Arts in Drama in 1991 and later earned a certification from the graduate-level Professional Program in Screenwriting at UCLA.

== Career ==
Porter appeared on American talent show Star Search in 1992 and won $100,000, appearing on the same show as other future stars, such as a young Britney Spears.

Porter played Teen Angel in the 1994 Broadway revival of Grease. Other shows he has been in include Miss Saigon on Broadway (1991; 1999), Topdog/Underdog at City Theatre (2004), Jesus Christ Superstar and Dreamgirls at Pittsburgh Civic Light Opera (2004), and the song cycles Myths and Hymns and Songs for a New World (Off-Broadway, 1995). His single "Show Me" was released on July 15, 1997.

Porter wrote and performed in his one-person autobiographical show, Ghetto Superstar (The Man That I Am) at Joe's Pub in New York City in February and March 2005. He was nominated for "Outstanding New York Theater: Broadway & Off Broadway Award" at the 17th GLAAD Media Awards.

In September 2010, Porter appeared as Belize in Signature Theatre Company's 20th Anniversary production of Tony Kushner's Angels in America.

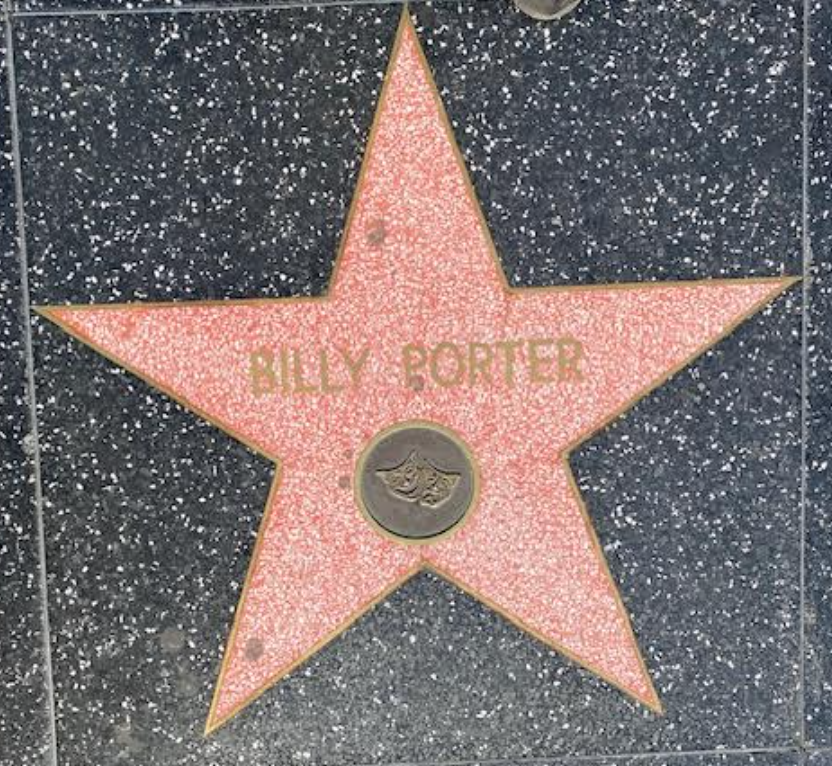
Porter's star on the Hollywood Walk of Fame.

Porter originated the role of "Lola" in Kinky Boots on Broadway in 2013, with songs by Cyndi Lauper, book by Harvey Fierstein and directed/choreographed by Jerry Mitchell. Porter won both the 2013 Drama Desk Award for Outstanding Actor in a Musical and Tony Award for Best Actor in a Musical for this role.

Porter has also appeared in several films. He played a major role as Shiniqua, a drag queen who befriends Angel (David Norona) and Lee (Keivyn McNeill Graves) in Seth Michael Donsky's Twisted (1997), an adaptation of Oliver Twist. He has also appeared on The RuPaul Show.

He has had a musical career with three solo albums: Billy Porter on DV8/A&M Records in 1997; At the Corner of Broadway + Soul in 2005 on Sh-K-Boom Records; and Billy's Back on Broadway (Concord Music Group) in 2014. He featured in a number of songs in the tribute album It's Only Life: The Songs of John Bucchino in 2006, released on PS Classics. He sings on Adam Guettel's 1999 album Myths and Hymns studio cast album on Nonesuch Records. He also covered "Only One Road" that was included on the Human Rights Campaign compilation album Love Rocks.

Porter wrote the play While I Yet Live, which premiered Off-Broadway at Primary Stages in September 2014 in previews, officially on October 12. In addition to Porter, the cast included Lillias White and S. Epatha Merkerson.

Porter released Billy Porter Presents the Soul of Richard Rodgers in April 2017. The album, which features new, soulful takes on classic Richard Rodgers songs, includes solos and duets from the following artists (in addition to Porter): Tony and Grammy Award winners Cynthia Erivo (The Color Purple), Renée Elise Goldsberry (Hamilton) and Leslie Odom Jr. (Hamilton), Tony Award-winner Patina Miller (Pippin), Grammy Award winners Pentatonix, India Arie and Ledisi, Tony Award nominees Brandon Victor Dixon (Shuffle Along), Joshua Henry (Violet), and Christopher Jackson (Hamilton), alongside YouTube and Kinky Boots star Todrick Hall and multiple Grammy Award nominee Deborah Cox.

Porter reprised the role of Lola in Kinky Boots in September 2017 on Broadway, where he did a 15-week run.

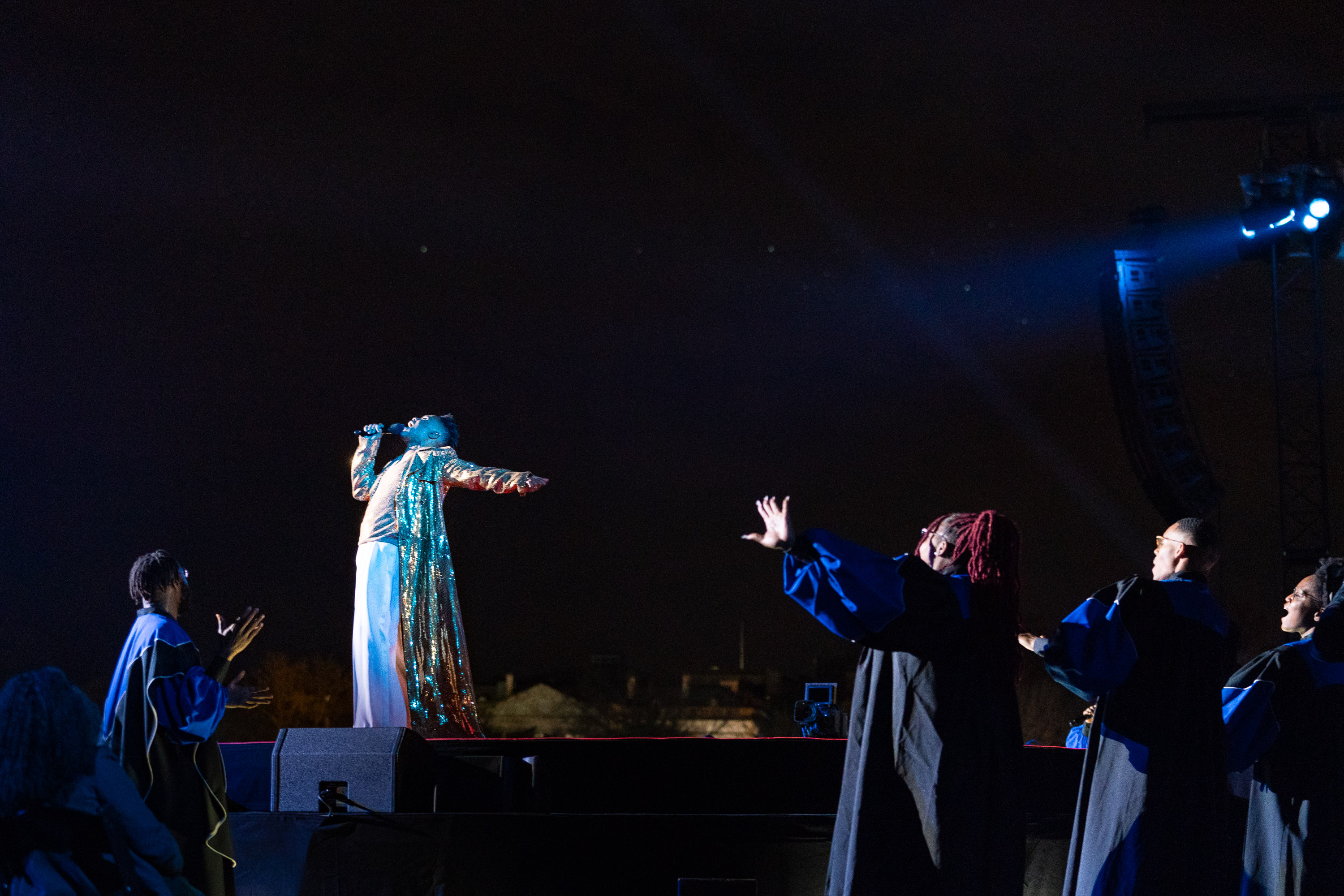
Porter performs during the National Christmas Tree Lighting on December 2, 2021, in Washington, D.C.

In 2018, Porter starred in the FX show Pose in the role of Pray Tell. In 2019, Pose earned its renewal for a third season after airing just one episode from the second season. In August 2018, Porter confirmed via Instagram that he was joining the cast of American Horror Story for its eighth season, subtitled Apocalypse. Porter duetted with Pose co-star Dyllón Burnside and sang from his album in a benefit concert emceed by Burnside on July 23, 2018, to celebrate the season 1 finale and to raise money for GLSEN. In June 2019, to mark the 50th anniversary of the Stonewall riots, sparking the start of the modern LGBTQ rights movement, Queerty named him one of the Pride50 "trailblazing individuals who actively ensure society remains moving towards equality, acceptance, and dignity for all queer people". Also in June 2019, he presented the Excellence in Theatre Education Award at the 73rd Tonys at Radio City Music Hall. However, he earned media coverage for his haute couture red and pink gown, upcycled from Kinky Boots' stage curtains, in a uterine shape, and his impromptu performance of "Everything's Coming up Roses" from Gypsy, for host James Corden's "Broadway karaoke". In September 2019, Porter was nominated for a Golden Globe Award and won the Primetime Emmy Award for Outstanding Lead Actor in a Drama Series for Pose, becoming the first openly gay black man to be nominated and win in any lead acting category at the Primetime Emmys.

Also, in 2019, Porter had a cameo appearance in Taylor Swift's "You Need to Calm Down" music video that featured twenty LGBTQ icons.

Porter performed "For What It's Worth" with Stephen Stills during the 2020 Democratic National Convention.

His memoir, Unprotected, was released in 2021. In 2022, Porter was included in the book 50 Key Figures in Queer US Theatre, with a chapter written by theatre scholar Eric M. Glover.

On December 1, 2022, Porter was honored with a star on the Hollywood Walk of Fame.

In April 2023, he was set to play James Baldwin in an upcoming biopic. In October 2024, he appeared on Eisa Davis and Lin-Manuel Miranda's musical concept album Warriors. He sang the role of Granger.

Porter starred as Emcee in the London revival of Cabaret from January to May 2025 alongside Marisha Wallace. Porter reprised the role on Broadway, alongside Wallace, from July until September 2025. The Broadway revival was originally slated to run until October 19, but set an earlier close date as Porter withdrew while recovering from a serious case of sepsis.

In March 2025, it was announced that Porter is featured on In the Garden, a concept album and musical by the artist Boyfriend set for release on May 9, 2025. The album reimagines the story of Adam and Eve but through Eve's lens. The project features Boyfriend as Eve alongside Porter (narrator), Jake Shears (Adam), Big Freedia (God), and Peaches (Serpent).

== Fashion ==
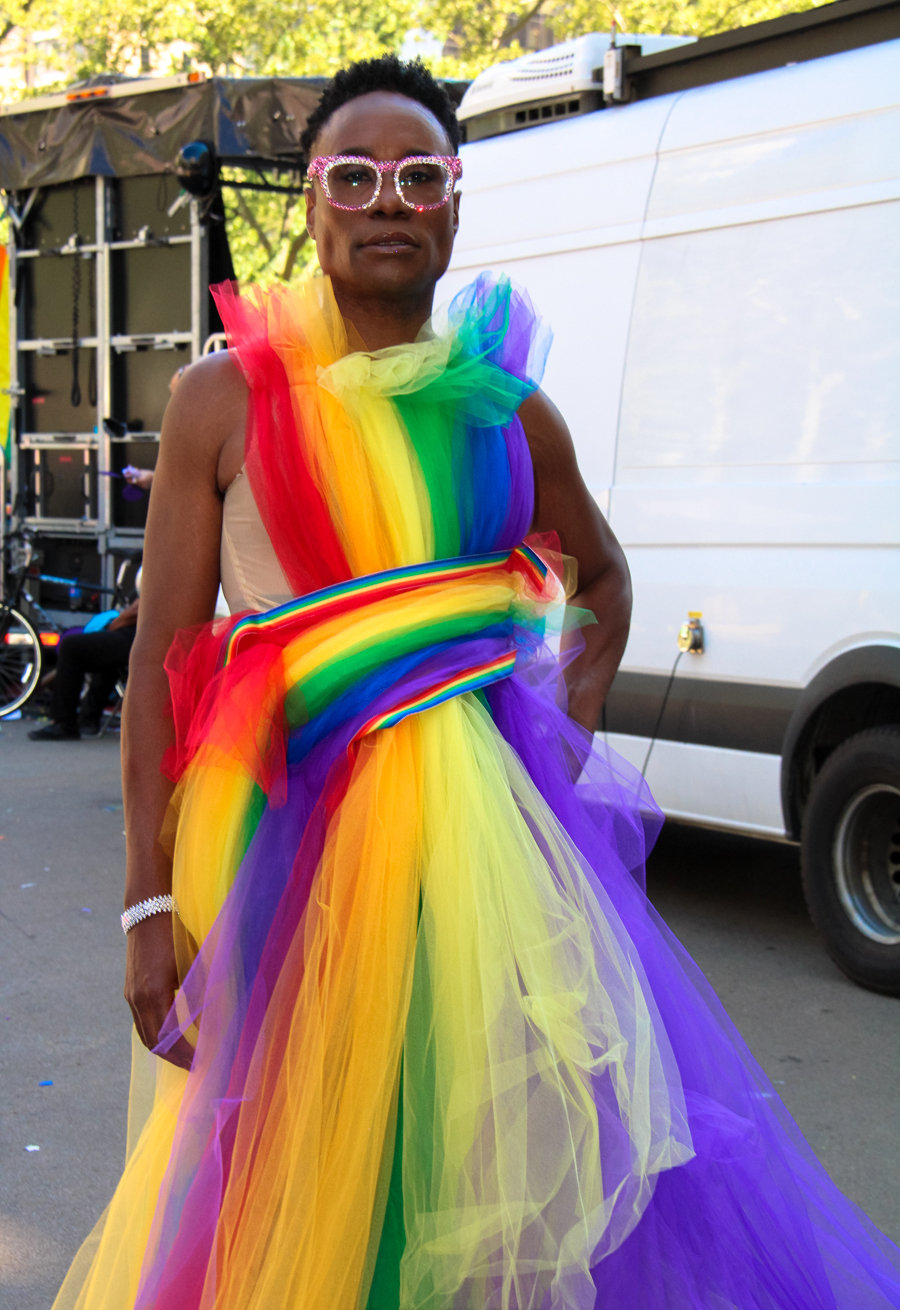
Porter at New York Pride 2019

Porter attributes his love of fashion from an early age to growing up in the black church which he describes as "a fashion show". His style has gone through many phases over the years, including vintage, Abercrombie and Fitch and geek chic. He has said that he intentionally set out to use fashion in a political way, to be a "walking piece of political art". Porter's stylist Sam Ratelle estimated that as of January 2020 they had worked on 150 red carpet looks together many designed by Porter himself. As of 2021, Porter's stylist is Ty Hunter, who has previously worked with Beyoncé.

He later became known for wearing a Gucci outfit to the Met Gala.

At the 2019 Golden Globes, Porter gained attention for wearing an embroidered suit and pink cape designed by Randi Rahm. He said the fact that people were surprised that he wore a cape inspired him to ask Christian Siriano if he could create him a ball gown because it was something he had always wanted to wear. He felt it seemed like a way to challenge people's ideas of masculinity. He continued to make fashion waves that year when he wore a fitted tuxedo jacket and a velvet gown by Christian Siriano with 6" Rick Owens boots to the 91st Academy Awards.

In February 2019, Porter was an Official Council of Fashion Designers of America (CFDA) Ambassador for New York Fashion Week: Mens. Porter attended the 2019 Met Gala and embraced the Camp: Notes on Fashion theme by being carried on a litter by six shirtless men while sporting a "Sun God" ensemble. The Blonds designed Porter's outfit, and it included a bejeweled catsuit outfitted with 10 ft (3.0 m) wings, a 24-karat gold headpiece, as well as custom gold-leaf Giuseppe Zanotti shoes and fine jewels by Andreoli, John Hardy, and Oscar Heyman.

In 2020, Porter wore a floor-length pink poncho style gown with a wide-brimmed black hat, a look he characterized as "Handmaid's Tale realness", to the AFI Awards and to the Golden Globes he wore an all-white ensemble that included a tuxedo jacket with a feathered train. He wore a sparkling turquoise bodysuit with matching bolero and a motorised hat to the Grammy awards.

== Concerts ==
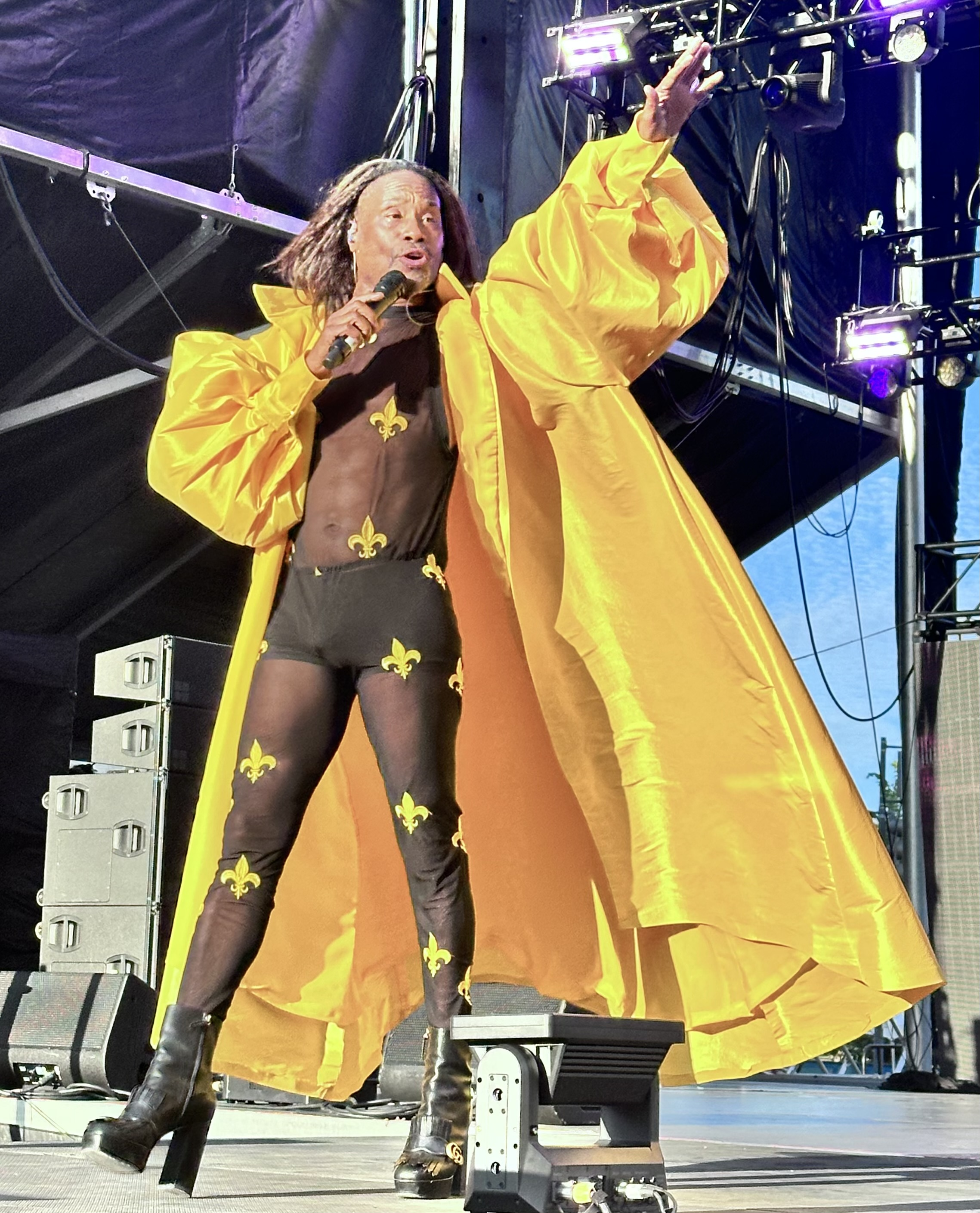
Porter performing at the 2024 Capital Pride Festival in Washington, D.C.

Porter has performed at various venues in New York City, including Lincoln Center, which was broadcast on PBS in 2015 and Joe's Pub in New York City. In 2019 Porter headlined at London Pride.

Porter performed "For What It's Worth" with Stephen Stills at the 2020 Democratic National Convention.

== Personal life ==
Porter is gay, having come out at the age of 16 "in the middle of the AIDS crisis". He married Adam Smith on January 14, 2017, after meeting him in 2009. He was very keen to get married "while Obama was still president and before January 20th, 2017", so the two got engaged on December 29, 2016, and married two weeks later. In July 2023, it was announced that Porter and Smith had separated. In September 2025, Porter began dating yoga instructor Eric Anderson.

Porter shared his views on race in the US in a 2020 interview with Vanity Fair, saying: "The reason why our country is in the mess we're in is simply because of whiteness. White supremacy. White people choke-holding power and sucking the life out of humanity."

Porter opposed the cultural boycott of Israel. In October 2023, he signed an open letter supporting Israel during the Gaza war.

In May 2021, Porter told The Hollywood Reporter that he had been diagnosed with HIV in June 2007; he was also diagnosed with type-2 diabetes in February 2007 and filed for bankruptcy in March 2007. In the same interview, he talked about renting a house on Long Island during the COVID-19 pandemic due to his pre-existing health conditions and about having intermittently attended psychotherapy since the age of 25.

In September 2025, Porter contracted a serious case of sepsis, which caused him to withdraw from his starring role in a Broadway revival of Cabaret while he recovered.

== Discography ==
=== Albums ===
- 1997: Billy Porter (DV8/A&M Records)
- 2005: At the Corner of Broadway + Soul (Sh-K-Boom Records)
- 2014: Billy's Back on Broadway (Concord Music Group)
- 2017: Billy Porter Presents the Soul of Richard Rodgers (Masterworks Broadway)
- 2023: Black Mona Lisa

=== Singles ===
List of singles as lead artist, with selected chart positions and certifications, showing year released and album name
Title	Year	Peak chart positions				Album
Title	Year	US	US Adult R&B	US Dance	US R&B/Hip-Hop	Album
"Love Is On the Way"	1996	—	—	—	81	The First Wives Club / Billy Porter
"Show Me"	1997	— (Note: "Show Me" did not enter the US Billboard Hot 100, but peaked at number 9 on the Bubbling Under Hot 100 Singles chart.)	15	—	44	Billy Porter
"Borrowed Time"	1998	—	31	—	—	Billy Porter
"Awaiting You"	2005	—	—	—	—	At the Corner of Broadway + Soul
"Time"	2005	—	—	—	—	At the Corner of Broadway + Soul
"Somewhere"	2007	—	—	—	—	Non-album single
"Land of Lola"	2013	—	—	—	—	Non-album single
"Edelweiss"	2017	—	—	—	—	Non-album single
"Love Yourself"	2019	—	—	1	—	Non-album single
"For What It's Worth"	2020	—	—	—	—	Non-album single
"Finally Ready"	2020	—	—	—	—	Non-album single
"Children"	2021	—	—	— (Note: "Children" did not enter the US Billboard Dance Club Songs, but peaked at number 25 on the Dance Digital Song Sales chart.)	—	Black Mona Lisa
"Monkey"	2022	—	—	—	—	Non-album single
"Stranger Things"	2022	—	—	—	—	Black Mona Lisa
"Baby Was a Dancer"	2023	—	—	—	—	Black Mona Lisa
"Fashion"	2023	—	—	—	—	Black Mona Lisa
"Broke a Sweat"	2023	—	—	—	—	Black Mona Lisa
"Always Be My Man" (with Luke Evans)	2023	—	—	—	—	Our Son
"Leap"	2024	—	—	—	—	Non-album single
"Never Say Never" (with Beverley Knight)	2025	—	—	—	—	Non-album single

=== Other songs ===
- "Only One Road" on Love Rocks compilation album
- "Destiny" with Jordan Hill on Jim Brickman's Greatest Hits album
- "Where Is Love?" with Liz Callaway

=== Appears in ===
- Featured on a number of songs on tribute album It's Only Life: The Songs of John Bucchino
- Sings "O Holy Night" on Rosie O'Donnell's Christmas album, A Rosie Christmas (1999)
- Adam Guettel's album Myths and Hymns in 1999
- He is featured with Alan Cumming, David Raleigh and Ari Gold in a cover of "That's What Friends Are For", for "The Friends Project" in support of the Ali Forney Center, a NYC shelter for homeless LGBT youth. The song was arranged and produced by Nathan Leigh Jones and directed by Michael Akers.

== Filmography ==
=== Film ===
Key
†	Denotes films that have not yet been released

Year	Title	Role	Notes	Ref.
1996	Twisted	Siniqua		
1996	The First Wives Club	Singer		
1997	Anastasia	Ensemble and character voices		
2000	The Intern	Sebastian Niederfarb		
2000	The Broken Hearts Club: A Romantic Comedy	Taylor		
2004	Noel	Randy		
2014	The Humbling	Prince		
2020	Like a Boss	Barrett		
2021	Cinderella	Fab G		
2022	Anything's Possible	—N/a	Directorial debut	
2023	80 for Brady	Gugu		
2023	Our Son	Gabriel		
2025	Christmas Karma	The Ghost of Christmas Present		
2026	The Hunger Games: Sunrise on the Reaping	Magno Stift		

=== Television ===
Year	Title	Role	Notes
1998	Another World	Billy Rush	Unknown episodes
1999	Shake, Rattle and Roll: An American Love Story	Little Richard	Television movie
2004	Law & Order	Greg Ellison	Episode: "Cry Wolf"
2007–2012	So You Think You Can Dance	Performer	4 episodes
2012	The Big C	Eric	Episode: "Thin Ice"
2013	Law & Order: Special Victims Unit	Jackie Walker	Episode: "Dissonant Voices"
2013	Land of Lola: Backstage at Kinky Boots	Host	8 episodes
2014	Christmas at Rockefeller Plaza	Performer	Television special
2015	Billy Porter: Broad & Soul	Performer	Television special
2016	The Get Down	DJ Malibu	Episode: "Where There Is Ruin, There Is Hope for a Treasure"
2018–2021	Pose	Pray Tell	24 episodes Black Reel Award for Outstanding Actor, Drama Series (2019); Primetime Emmy Award for Outstanding Lead Actor in a Drama Series (2019); Nominated—Critics' Choice Television Award for Best Actor in a Drama Series (2019–2020); Nominated—Golden Globe Award for Best Actor – Television Series Drama (2019–2020); Nominated—NAACP Image Award for Outstanding Actor in a Drama Series; Nominated—Primetime Emmy Award for Outstanding Lead Actor in a Drama Series (2020–2021); Nominated—Television Critics Association Award for Individual Achievement in Drama
2018	American Horror Story: Apocalypse	Behold Chablis	5 episodes
2019	Saturday Night Live	Himself	Episode: "David Harbour/Camila Cabello"
2019–2023	Dick Clark's New Year's Rockin' Eve	Himself	New Orleans correspondent (2019–20, 2021–22, 2022–23), Times Square correspondent (2020–21)
2020	The Simpsons	Desmond	Voice, episode: "Highway to Well"
2020	The Twilight Zone	Keith	Episode: "The Who of You"; Nominated—Saturn Award for Best Guest Starring Role on Television
2020	Saturday Night Seder	Himself	Television special
2020	Equal	Narrator	4 episodes
2021	That Damn Michael Che	Atomic Twan / Security Guard	2 episodes
2021	Middlemost Post	Recycle King	Voice, episode: "BURT! The Musical"
2021	Gossip Girl	Himself	Episode: "Hope Sinks"
2021–2022	Fairfax	Hiroki Hassan	Voice, 6 episodes
2022	RuPaul's Drag Race: UK vs. the World	Special guest	Series 1 Episode 6: "Grand Finale"
2022	Central Park	Vance	Voice, episode: "Celeste We Forget"
2022–present	The Proud Family: Louder and Prouder	Randall Leibowitz-Jenkins	Voice, 5 episodes
2023	Black + Iconic	Host	Episode: "Style Gods"
2023	Dancing with the Stars	Guest Judge	Season 32
2023	Big Mouth	Ocean	Voice, episode: "Big Mouth's Going to High School (But Not for Nine More Episodes)"

=== Theater ===
Sources: Playbill Vault; Off-Broadway Database

- Miss Saigon, Ensemble/John (u/s), Broadway (1991)
- Grease, Teen Angel, Broadway (1994)
- The Merchant of Venice, Solanio, Off-Broadway (1995)
- Songs for a New World, performer, Off-Broadway (1995)
- Smokey Joe's Cafe, performer, Broadway (1995–97)
- Miss Saigon, John (replacement), Broadway (1998–99)
- Jesus Christ Superstar, Jesus of Nazareth, Helen Hayes Performing Arts Center, Nyack, NY (1998)
- Dreamgirls, James Thunder Early, New York Actors Fund concert (September 2001)
- Radiant Baby, Various, Off-Broadway (2003)
- Little Shop of Horrors, Audrey ll, Actors' Playhouse, Florida (pre-Broadway tryout) (2003)
- Topdog/Underdog, City Theatre, Pittsburgh, PA (2004)
- Chef's Theater: A Musical Feast, Performer, Off-Broadway (2004)
- Ghetto Superstar, Performer, Off-Broadway (2005) – also playwright
- Birdie Blue, Bam/Little Pimp/Sook/Minerva, Off-Broadway (2005)
- Putting It Together, performer, New York (2009)
- Angels in America, Belize, Off-Broadway (2010)
- Kinky Boots, Lola, Broadway (2013–2015)
- Kinky Boots, Lola (replacement), Tour (2014)
- HAM: A Musical Memoir, Off-Broadway (2015) – director
- Shuffle Along, or the Making of the Musical Sensation of 1921 and All That Followed, Aubrey Lyles, Broadway (2016)
- White Rabbit Red Rabbit, Off-Broadway (2016)
- Kinky Boots, Lola (replacement), Broadway (2017–2018)
- Eric André Live Near Broadway (2023)
- Jelly's Last Jam, Chimney Man, Encores! (2024)
- Cabaret, The Emcee (replacement), West End & Broadway (2025)
- La Cage aux Folles, Albin, Encores! (2026)
- Shuffle Along, Aubrey Lyles, Lincoln Center Concert (2026)

== Awards and nominations ==
Year	Award	Category	Work	Result	Ref.
2013	Broadway.com Audience Choice Awards	Favorite Leading Actor in a Broadway Musical	Kinky Boots	Won	
2013	Broadway.com Audience Choice Awards	Favorite Funny Performance	Kinky Boots	Nominated	
2013	Broadway.com Audience Choice Awards	Best Onstage Pair with Stark Sands	Kinky Boots	Nominated	
2013	Drama League Awards	Distinguished Performance Award	Kinky Boots	Nominated	
2013	Drama Desk Awards	Outstanding Leading Actor in a Musical	Kinky Boots	Won	
2013	Fred and Adele Astaire Awards	Outstanding Male Dancer in a Broadway Musical Show	Kinky Boots	Nominated	
2013	Outer Critics Circle Awards	Outstanding Lead Actor in a Musical	Kinky Boots	Won	
2013	Tony Awards	Best Leading Actor in a Musical	Kinky Boots	Won	
2014	Grammy Awards	Best Musical Theater Album	Kinky Boots	Won	
2017	GLAAD Media Awards	Vito Russo Award		Won	
2019	Critics' Choice Awards	Best Television Drama Series Actor	Pose	Nominated	
2019	Dorian Awards	TV Performance of the Year – Actor	Pose	Won	
2019	Dorian Awards	TV Musical Performance of the Year	"Home" (with Mj Rodriguez and Our Lady J)	Won	
2019	Primetime Emmy Awards	Outstanding Lead Actor in a Drama Series	Pose	Won	
2019	Golden Globe Awards	Best Actor in a Television Series – Drama	Pose	Nominated	
2019	Television Critics Association	Individual Achievement in Drama	Pose	Nominated	
2020	Critics' Choice Awards	Best Television Drama Series Actor	Pose	Nominated	
2020	Dorian Awards	TV Performance of the Year – Actor	Pose	Won	
2020	Dorian Awards	Wilde Wit of the Year		Nominated	
2020	Dorian Awards	Wilde Artist of the Decade		Nominated	
2020	Golden Globe Awards	Best Actor in a Television Series – Drama	Pose	Nominated	
2020	Primetime Emmy Awards	Outstanding Lead Actor in a Drama Series	Pose	Nominated	
2020	Queerties	Badass of the Year		Won	
2020	Black Reel Television Awards	Outstanding Actor, Drama Series	Pose	Nominated	
2021	Primetime Emmy Awards	Outstanding Lead Actor in a Drama Series	Pose	Nominated	
2021	Elizabeth Taylor AIDS Foundation	Elizabeth Taylor Commitment to End AIDS award (with Anthony Fauci, Sandra Thurman and amFAR)		Won	
2022	Golden Globe Awards	Best Actor in a Television Series - Drama	Pose	Nominated	
2022	Tony Award	Best Musical	A Strange Loop (producer)	Won	
2023	NAACP Image Awards	Outstanding Character Voice-Over Performance (Television)	The Proud Family: Louder and Prouder	Nominated	
2024	Tony Awards	Isabelle Stevenson Award	Recognition of his work with Elizabeth Taylor AIDS Foundation and Entertainment Community Fund.	Honored	

== See also ==
- African-American Tony nominees and winners
- LGBT culture in New York City
- List of LGBT people from New York City
- NYC Pride March
