= Pornography: A Thriller =

- Theatrical release poster
- Directed by: David Kittredge
- Written by: David Kittredge
- Produced by: Sean Abley
- Starring: Matthew Montgomery; Pete Scherer; Jared Grey; Walter Delmar; Dylan Vox; Steve Callahan; Wyatt Fenner; Larry Weissman; Nick Salamone
- Cinematography: Ivan Corona
- Edited by: Mike Justice; David Kittredge
- Music by: Robb Williamson
- Production company: Triple Fire Productions
- Release date: June 21, 2009 (Frameline San Francisco)
- Running time: 113 minutes
- Country: United States
- Language: English

Pornography: A Thriller is a 2009 American mystery/thriller film, written and directed by David Kittredge.

Pornography: A Thriller is a non-linear story in three parts, all revolving around the disappearance of fictional adult gay film actor Mark Anton (Jared Grey). The first act depicts Anton's final days in 1995, the second is about writer Michael Castigan (Matthew Montgomery) as he searches for the truth in 2009 about what happened to Anton, and the third revolves around 2009 adult film actor Matt Stevens's (Pete Scherer) attempt to make The Mark Anton Story, based in part on his dreams of what happened to Anton.

The film uses an unconventional structure, with actors playing multiple roles in different sections, and uses dream logic to tell its story through a subjective point of view. Because of this, it has been compared to the work of David Lynch (most notably Lost Highway and Mulholland Drive) and David Cronenberg (notably Videodrome).

Kittredge says about the structure, "We wanted to replicate the dream logic of a nightmare. So even though we don’t spell everything out for the audience, the film is still a complete whole and has its own fully formed arc that’s hopefully a satisfying whole."

== Cast ==
- Matthew Montgomery as Michael Castigan
- Pete Scherer as Matt Stevens
- Jared Grey as Mark Anton
- Walter Delmar as William/Jason
- Dylan Vox as Jason Steele
- Steve Callahan as Jerome
- Akie Kotabe as Jeremy/Adam
- Wyatt Fenner as Student/Angel
- Larry Weissman as Harry
- Jon Gale as Rex
- Nick Salamone as Billy
- Bret Wolfe as Bishop Scott

== Production ==
The film was shot in 16 days for under $200,000. And although much of the film takes place in New York City and Brooklyn, it was mostly shot in and around Los Angeles.

The film was shot primarily with Panasonic HVX200 cameras. One was outfitted with a PS Technik adapter, which gave the image a filmic depth of field and grain that emulated 16mm. There were a variety of other cameras used as well in different parts (mostly in a "practical" fashion, denoting footage that was shot in the story of the film), including the Panasonic DVX100a, a Sony Handycam, and an 80s-era Sony Video 8 camcorder (featured prominently in the film).

The 5.1 sound mix was done by Sonicpool in Hollywood and the HD color-correct and finishing was done at Postworks, New York.

== Release ==
Pornography: A Thriller premiered at Newfest: the New York LGBT Film Festival in June 2009. It played at over 25 film festivals around the world, including Outfest, Frameline, Philadelphia QFest, and Reeling Chicago.

The film was theatrically released in the US on April 13, 2010, at the Cinema Village in New York City. The film was released theatrically in Germany by Bildkraft on July 9, 2010, and the UK by Peccadillo Pictures on August 27.

The film was released on DVD and iTunes in the United States by Wolfe Video July 13, 2010. The DVD features ten deleted or extended scenes, a commentary track featuring writer/director David Kittredge, producer Sean Abley and actors Matthew Montgomery, Pete Scherer and Jared Grey, and a behind-the-scenes featurette called "Smile For the Camera".

Digitally, the film was released in the United States on DVD and iTunes on August 30, 2010. The film was released on DVD in France by Optimale on August 31, 2010. Peccadillo Pictures also launched an aggressive online campaign for the film in the guise of a fake "snuff film" website, based on the plot points about a mysterious videotape and symbol; the site featured recut snippets of the film and spread virally.

The world television premiere on Logo Network was October 31, 2010.

== Critical response ==
Pornography was very well received at several film festivals, and won awards at two.

Critics had polarized responses. "Kind of pretentious.... Kind of amazing, too," was the summation in New York's L Magazine., who also named it "The Citizen Kane of Gay Porn Ghost Stories". Reverse Shot lauded the "well placed" plot twists and "nicely paced" mystery, saying that it was "impressively committed to its own vision and logic". The Village Voice called it "Ambitiously layered" and "Unabashedly arty and impressively shot". Chuck Wilson of LA Weekly called the film "a crazily ambitious debut thriller" and "Pornography marks Kittredge as filmmaker with a strong mind and a gift for drawing full-bodied performances from his actors". Tirdad Derakhshani of The Philadelphia Inquirer named it "a deeply affecting and disturbing thriller that has earned Kittredge comparisons to David Lynch and David Cronenberg." Matthew Sorrento's positive review in Film Threat states "When handled well, dread can extend far beyond our conscious need for order – Lovecraft himself held that our fear is strongest when we fear the unknown. Pornography approaches this conceit without the timidity of lesser efforts." He ends with "I recommend all fans of the bizarre have a look."

== Awards ==
Year	Festival	Award	Category
2009	Long Island LGBT Film Festival	Jury Award	Best Debut Feature
2010	FilmOut San Diego	Audience Award	Best First Narrative Feature
2010	FilmOut San Diego	Programming Award	Outstanding Emerging Talent, David Kittredge

== Festivals ==
2009

- Newfest: the New York LGBT Film Festival (World Premiere)
- Frameline: the San Francisco LGBT Film Festival
- Outfest: the Los Angeles LGBT Film Festival
- QFest: the Philadelphia LGBT Film Festival (centerpiece selection)
- "Best of NewFest" @ BAM
- Out on Film: the Atlanta LGBT Film Festival (closing night)
- Cinema Diverse: The Gay and Lesbian Film Festival of Palm Springs
- Tampa International LGBT Film Festival
- Reel Affirmations: the Washington DC LGBT Film Festival
- Atlantic Film Festival, Halifax, Nova Scotia
- Portland LGBT Film Festival
- OutTakes Dallas (closing night)
- Reeling: the Chicago LGBT Film Festival
- Fresno Reel Pride: Night Out Film Festival
- image+nation: Montreal LGBT Film Festival
- Long Island LGBT Film Festival (opening night)

2010

- Reelout Queer Film & Video Festival, Kingston, Ontario
- Brussels LGBT Film Festival
- Mardi Gras Film Festival, Sydney, Australia
- Miami LGBT Film Festival (special screening, Feb 21)
- Melbourne Queer Film Festival
- Brisbane Queer Film Festival
- FilmOut San Diego (centerpiece selection)
- Seoul LGBT Film Festival (centerpiece selection)
- ColognePride, Cologne, Germany
- Vancouver LGBT Film Festival
