= Peter Porte =

American actor

- Born: March 31, 1984 (age 42); Greenwood Lake, New York
- Education: New York University (BFA)
- Occupation: Actor
- Years active: 2005–present
- Spouse: Jacob Jules Villere (m. 2018)

Peter Porte (born March 31, 1984) is an American actor, known for his role as Ricky Williams on the soap opera The Young and the Restless, the films It's Not Porn... and Sutures, and the sitcom Baby Daddy playing Brad Walker, who is married to Bonnie Wheeler.

He also played Josh on the Netflix comedy series Uncoupled opposite Neil Patrick Harris. In 2021, he starred as Dimitri Von Leuschner on the limited series Days of Our Lives: Beyond Salem; he later reprised his role on Days of Our Lives in 2023 and again in 2026.

== Early life and education ==
Porte grew up in Greenwood Lake, New York, and always wanted to be an actor. Porte first got into acting in the third grade when he appeared in a Christopher Columbus pageant. According to Porte, he only got the role because his mother, who is from Poland, made his costume out of "traditional Polish garb." Porte continued acting throughout high school and ultimately decided to become a professional actor. Porte graduated from George F. Baker High School in 2002. He earned a BFA in Acting at New York University's Tisch School of the Arts. Porte then went onto study at the Royal Academy of Dramatic Art in London.

== Personal life ==
On October 7, 2018, Porte married Jacob Villere in a ceremony held in New Orleans.

== Career ==
Though he always considered himself an actor, Porte started his career as a model. He's done shows in Milan and Paris.

He toured with the National Company of Mamma Mia!, after which he made the move to Los Angeles. On stage, he performed five seasons with the critically acclaimed For the Record company. Some of his videos are on the website Funny or Die.

He's had lead and supporting roles in film and hit network television shows including: Cold Case, CSI: Miami, Medium, The New Normal and Parks and Recreation. In 2011, he joined the cast of The Young and the Restless as a series regular, playing the role of Ricky Williams. Following his run on the series, he had recurring roles in Devious Maids for the Lifetime Network and in Baby Daddy for FreeForm. He has also had roles in episodes of the NBC comedy Telenovela, CBS Mom and NCIS: LA, and Fox New Girl.

Porte starred in the indie thriller The Good Nanny and the made-for-television movie A Cinderella Christmas for ION Television, while recurring on the comedy web series Living with Models, and starring in the world premiere of Eve Ensler's play O.P.C. at the American Repertory Theatre.

Porte starred as a surfer in the 2017 Hallmark movie, Love at the Shore. He also starred in the 2018 film, Love, Once and Always and 2019 film Rome in Love for Hallmark.

In 2020, he starred as one of the gay leads in the landmark production Dashing in December, one of the first LGBTQ+ centered Christmas romance movies produced for mainstream television.

In 2021, he starred as Dimitri von Leuschner on the limited series Days of Our Lives: Beyond Salem, he later reprised his role on Days of Our Lives in 2023. Dimitri is revealed to be the son of Megan Hathaway (Miranda Wilson) and a member of the DiMera family. In 2022, he played Josh on the Netflix comedy series Uncoupled opposite Neil Patrick Harris. He will appear as Deacon Granville in the audio drama Montecito, beginning April 22, 2025.

== Filmography ==
Year	Title	Role	Notes
2005	University Place	Jeremy	Television film
2008	Medium	Fourth man	Episode: "Lady Killer"
2008	Viralcom	Marcos	Episode: "You Got Yourself 30 Seconds"
2008	CSI: Miami	Brad Garland	Episode: "Gone Baby Gone"
2009	Cold Case	Tucker "Duke" Benton (1966)	Episode: "The Crossing"
2009	Moon Lake Casino	Pierre	Short film
2011–12	The Young and the Restless	Ricky Williams	Series regular; 51 episodes
2012	Parks and Recreation	Carl	Episode: "Ron and Diane"
2013	The New Normal	Mr. Rodriguez	Episode: "Dog Children"
2013	Devious Maids	Scott	2 episodes
2013	NCIS: Los Angeles	Joseph	Episode: "Omni"
2013	Mom	Dr. Huss	Episodes: "Cotton Candy and Blended Fish"
2014	Baby Daddy	Brad Walker	Recurring role, 19 episodes
2014	Hot Fail	Thomas	Television film
2014	Sutures	Drake	Short film
2015	Lusa	Gad	2 episodes
2016	Last Will and Testicle	Fake Testicle	1 Episode
2016	Telenovela	Blaze Deluxe	Episode: "Split Personalities"
2016	Living with Models	Dominic	7 episodes
2016	Modern Romance	Sven	1 episode
2016	A Cinderella Christmas	Nikolaus Karmichael	Television film (ION)
2017	New Girl	Jack	Episode: "Misery"
2017	The Good Nanny	Travis Walsh	Television film (Lifetime)
2017	Love at the Shore	Lucas McKinnon	Television film (Hallmark)
2017	A Gift to Remember	Aiden Harris	Television film (Hallmark)
2018	Love, Once and Always	Duncan	Television film (Hallmark)
2018	Christmas Harmony	Devin	Television Film (Lifetime)
2019	Rome in Love	Phillip	Television film (Hallmark)
2019	Cherished Memories: A Gift to Remember 2	Aiden Harris	Television film (Hallmark)
2020	Dashing in December	Wyatt	Television film (MTV)
2021	Days of Our Lives: Beyond Salem	Kyle Graham/Dimitri von Leuschner	Limited series
2022	Uncoupled	Josh Gibson	Episode: "Chapter 5"
2023, 2026	Days of Our Lives	Dimitri von Leuschner	Series regular
2023	Notes of Autumn	Matt	Television film (Hallmark)
2026	The Love Heist	Mills	Television film (Hallmark)
