= Dashing in December =

2020 film directed by Jake Helgren

- Official release poster
- Directed by: Jake Helgren
- Written by: Jake Helgren
- Screenplay by: Jake Helgren
- Produced by: Autumn Federici; Jake Helgren
- Starring: Peter Porte; Juan Pablo Di Pace; Andie MacDowell; Caroline Harris; Carlos Sanz; Katherine Bailess
- Cinematography: Lars Lindstrom
- Edited by: Sean Cain
- Music by: Chad Rehmann
- Production company: The Ninth House
- Distributed by: Paramount Network
- Release date: December 13, 2020
- Running time: 88 minutes
- Country: United States
- Language: English

Dashing in December is an American romantic holiday drama film written and directed by Jake Helgren. The film stars Peter Porte, Juan Pablo Di Pace, Andie MacDowell, Caroline Harris, Carlos Sanz, and Katherine Bailess.

== Premise ==
Wyatt Burwall (Porte) finally returns home for the holidays in an effort to convince his mother Deb (McDowell) to sell the family's Colorado ranch. A romance unexpectedly ignites between Wyatt and the dashing new ranch hand Heath Ramos (Di Pace), who dreams of saving the beloved property and the ranch's magical Winter Wonderland attraction while reawakening the spirit of Christmas in Wyatt's lonely heart.

== Cast ==
- Peter Porte as Wyatt Burwall
- Juan Pablo Di Pace as Heath Ramos
- Andie MacDowell as Deb Burwall
- Caroline Harris as Blake Berry
- Carlos Sanz as Carlos
- Katherine Bailess as Willa

== Production ==
Despite the story taking place in Colorado, the movie was filmed in Utah, in different cities including Salt Lake City, Midway and Heber City. Most of the material was shot in September 2020, and the filming wrapped on October 1.

== Release ==
The film was released on December 13, 2020, by Paramount Network with simulcasts on Pop TV, Logo TV, and TV Land.

== Accolades ==
Dashing in December was nominated for the 2021 GLAAD Media Award for Outstanding TV Movie.

== See also ==
- List of Christmas films
- Gay cowboy
