= Nathan Leigh Jones =

- Nathan Leigh Jones performing live in 2007

Background information
- Born: Nathan Leigh Jones; 6 April 1981 (age 45); Adelaide, South Australia, Australia
- Genres: Pop, indie, acoustic
- Occupations: Public speaker, researcher, singer-songwriter, voice over artist
- Instruments: Vocals, piano
- Years active: 2004–present
- Website: www.nlj.co

Nathan Leigh Jones (born 6 April 1981) is an Australian musician, public speaker and voice over artist. He has an honours degree in psychology and researches the effects of music and words on emotion. He also teaches in the area of communication.

As a singer-songwriter, Jones has performed on stage with Lior, Guy Sebastian and Wendy Matthews. He has also produced music for Billy Porter, Alan Cumming and Rhonda Ross.

== Music ==
=== Early career ===
After submitting a demo, Jones was named "Artist Of The Year" at the 2004 Musicoz Awards, edging out fellow nominees Bliss n Eso. The ceremony was hosted by Dylan Lewis and Annalise Braakensiek at the WIN Entertainment Centre, and was broadcast nationally on 11 December 2004. As part of the prize, his debut album 10 Letters was recorded with Sony Music Australia featuring the single Day After Day. The following year, Jones returned to the 2005 Musicoz Awards to perform Day After Day and co-present an award with Yumi Stynes.

In 2007, Jones composed and arranged the music for Centrelink The Musical which made its debut at the 2008 Adelaide Fringe Festival. According to the show's creator, Jones "was keen to just work on something fun" after complications with a record deal. The musical was generally well-received, with a score that was "beautifully timed and refreshingly snappy".

Later that year, Jones relocated to New York City and began to work on some new music at The Cutting Room Studios. As a result, the pop-heavy single Lip Sync was released in September 2008. Speaking with The Sydney Morning Herald about the independent release, he said: “At this stage in my career, especially after receiving some limiting contracts from labels, I actually can't think of anything more freeing.”

=== 2009–2013 ===
In 2010, Jones arranged and produced a remake of the song That's What Friends Are For featuring David Raleigh, Billy Porter, Ari Gold and Alan Cumming. The song's music video received airplay on Logo TV, with proceeds supporting the Ali Forney Center.

Jones returned to Australia to record his second album Sooner Or Later at Studios 301, then launched the album in New York City at Joe's Pub on 3 April 2011. It was noted that, despite being an independent release, it "has all the polish of a major label recording". The album features Grammy Award-winning musicians Dan Warner and Lee Levin, with backing vocals from The Idea Of North's Naomi Crellin and Sally Cameron.

The lead single Beautiful You became the No. 1 most requested video on Max in December 2011. The follow-up single, Crying Out For Love, featured backing vocals from 20 members of the Sydney Philharmonia Choir. Incorporating a street rally for same-sex marriage on 25 May 2013, the music video was filmed throughout Darlinghurst and praised for "celebrat(ing) more of what we have in common, rather than what separates us".

In 2013, Jones released the seasonal album Brand New Christmas that re-imagined 10 holiday classics, including the single Winter Wonderland featuring David Raleigh. The music video was filmed in New York City and premiered at the US album launch on 28 November. The following year, Jones also produced and co-wrote the single Stay with David Raleigh featuring Rhonda Ross.

== Voice over career ==
Jones' voice has been featured on station promos for Eleven, Nickelodeon Australia and MTV Australia, and has been used on imaging for commercial radio networks Hit, Nova and KIIS.

== Education ==
In 2017, Jones received a Bachelor of Behavioural Studies from Swinburne. On asking why he returned to university, Jones said: "I’ve always written music and listened to it therapeutically, so studying human behaviour just seemed, for me at least, a logical progression." The following year, Jones completed a Bachelor of Psychological Science at The University of Adelaide and obtained First Class Honours. His thesis gave the first empirical demonstration that lyrics have an effect on felt emotion above and beyond the actual sound of the music.

== Discography ==
- 10 Letters (2006) MGM Distribution
- Lip Sync – Single (2008) Independent
- Sooner or Later (April 2011) Independent
- Brand New Christmas (November 2013) Independent
