= Nancy Criss =

American actress

- Born: Nancy Criss
- Occupation(s): Actor, producer, director
- Years active: 1973

Nancy Criss is an American producer, awards director and actress. She host and produces the entertainment news magazine show On the Road Weekly on ION television.

By the age of 13, Criss began her career in show business, with a role in the TV series Petrocelli, followed by several independent projects. She has appeared in TV, feature films, commercials and stage plays. She currently lives in Tucson, Arizona.

Nancy Criss is President and co-founder of Nandar Entertainment Inc.

Criss was born in Elkhart, Indiana.

== Filmography ==
Year	Title	Role	Note
2003	True Legends of the West	Sylvia Sutherland	
2005	Flat Tire	Producer	
2007	Manje	Producer	
2007	Only in L.A.	Herself	TV series - 8 episodes
2008	Fear House	Producer	
2009	On the Road Weekly	Herself	TV series - 14 episodes
2009	Suffer the Child	Producer/Director	
2009	Mindbender (2009 film)	Producer	
2011	Finding Mr. Wright	Producer/Director	
2017	Take Two for Faith	director	

== See also ==
- List of female film and television directors
- List of LGBT-related films directed by women
