= Gone, But Not Forgotten (film) =

- Theatrical release poster
- Directed by: Michael D. Akers
- Produced by: Michael D. Akers, Sandon Berg
- Starring: Matthew Montgomery; Aaron Orr
- Cinematography: Jennifer Derbin
- Edited by: Michael D. Akers; Justin Shumaker (co-editor)
- Music by: Shaun Cromwell
- Distributed by: United Gay Network
- Release date: 2003
- Running time: 90 minutes
- Country: United States
- Language: English

Gone, But Not Forgotten is a 2003 film directed by Michael D. Akers. The critically acclaimed film showed at more than 30 film festivals. It is among the films featured in Gary Kramer's book, Independent Queer Cinema: Reviews and Interviews. The cover of the book displays the poster for the film; the director, Michael Akers, and the star, Matthew Montgomery, are both interviewed in Chapter Five.

== Synopsis ==
Mark (Matthew Montgomery) falls while rock climbing. Drew (Aaron Orr) a forest ranger saves him and watches over him at the hospital. Drew, seeing Mark suffering from amnesia, offers Mark to move in with him to try to help him out until he regains his memory. This propels the two men into a passionate affair. But things start to change as Mark's memory slowly returns.

== Cast ==
- Matthew Montgomery as Mark Reeves
- Aaron Orr as Drew Parker
- Ariadne Shaffer as Catherine Reeves
- Joel Bryant as Paul Parker
- Brenda Lasker as Nancy Parker
- Bryna Weiss as Dr. Mary Williams
- Holden Roark as Towey
- Jenny Kim as Nurse
- Daniel Lee as Intern in Hallway
- Mark Fellows as Man in Wheelchair
- Joanne Bevelaqua as Drew's Mother
- Glenn Blakeslee as Drew's Father
- Brooke Hamlin as Kathy Tannenbaum

== Filming ==
This film was "shot in 18 days by a cast and crew of 12, for a budget that wouldn’t buy a car." Filming in seven weeks in Pinecrest, California, near Yosemite National Park, the director, Akers, used his personal credit cards for financing.

== Screenings ==
The film has been screened in more than 30 film festivals including Outfest, Austin, Chicago, Memphis, Philadelphia, Rochester, Seattle, Tampa and internationally in Barcelona, Brussels, Hamburg, Ibiza, Lisbon, Madrid, Manila, New Zealand and Sydney
