= David Raleigh =

American singer-songwriter

- Born: David Julius Raleigh; Rochester, New York, U.S.
- Origin: Seattle, Washington, U.S.
- Genres: Pop, soul, jazz
- Occupations: Singer-songwriter, presenter
- Instruments: Vocals, piano
- Years active: 1980–present
- Labels: Evolution Records, Independent
- Website: davidraleigh.com

David Raleigh is a New York City based singer, songwriter and piano player.

== History ==
Born in Rochester, New York, David Raleigh moved to Seattle at the age of four. After receiving a scholarship to attend Interlochen Arts Academy in Michigan, David recorded his first record "Totally Psyched" that sent him on the road touring with contemporary Christian acts such as Amy Grant and The Archers. Raleigh's first television appearance was in 1990 as the winner of hit American show Star Search.

In 1993, Raleigh played himself in a small feature role in the German cult movie Little Sharks. His second album ‘Never Alone’ was recorded and released in 1995, and his songs have appeared in the film Alchemy, directed by Eric Oppenheimer. Raleigh has since played in numerous venues across New York, including Manhattan's Stringfellows, Waldorf Astoria, The Hotel Pierre, The Ritz-Carlton Battery Park and Joe's Pub. In late 2010, David released his first music video "I Do!" directed by Emmy nominated and Tony award winner Alan Cumming and Ned Stressen-Reuter. The video went on to stay in the Top 10 on MTV’s Logo Channel for 13 consecutive weeks.

== Current projects ==
David Raleigh co-founded The Friends Project in 2010. He teamed up again with Alan Cumming, Tony award winner Billy Porter and Sir Ari Gold to perform a remake of the ‘80s hit made popular by Dionne Warwick and Friends, "That’s What Friends Are For". The proceeds from each iTunes download go to the Ali Forney Center, the nation's largest organization providing housing and support to homeless LGBT youth. Nathan Leigh Jones produced the remake and Michael Akers directed the music video. David Raleigh is also the host of "Music Scene", which airs on The Destination Network, servicing resort and cultural markets throughout the southeast of the United States. Interviewing local bands and musicians, the show offers tourists a peek into the local music landscape.
