= Philadelphia QFest =

LGBTQ film festival in Pennsylvania, USA

Philadelphia QFest was founded in Philadelphia as the Philadelphia Gay and Lesbian Film Festival by TLA Entertainment Group in 1996. It was given its current name, QFest, in 2009.

One of the festival's founders and current Artistic Director, Raymond Murray, describes QFest's mission as giving gay and lesbian audiences the opportunity to see films that accurately reflect their life experiences without the filter of the "straight" Hollywood system.

== History ==
This event is the third largest of its kind in the United States, and the largest on the East Coast. The festival is held in Center City Philadelphia in various venues near and on the Avenue of the Arts. Film screenings take place at the Prince Music Theater, the Wilma Theater, and several other locations that differ from year to year. It takes place for two weeks annually in mid-July and shows as many as two hundred films from more than forty countries. There is a juried competition for best features and shorts (gay male and lesbian) as well as audience awards, selected by the viewers.

In 2014, QFest was cancelled for the first year since its founding in 1995. Due to lack of fundraising and the unavailability of Raymond Murray to lead the film programming, the festival was postponed and then canceled for the year.

Due to the cancellation of the festival in 2014, Thom Cardwell, QFest head, and James Duggan announced that they would launching qFLIX Philadelphia to take its place. QFLIX is a weeklong festival that presents independent international and national LGBTQ+ films.

An event known as "There's No Place Like Home" is a two-week long celebration that takes place concurrently with QFest. This offers alternate activities for patrons to attend in between and after film screenings. The event is held in celebration of Philadelphia's thriving "Gayborhood" and has featured a ribbon-cutting ceremony, block parties, photo exhibits and many other special events throughout the festival.

TLA had previously hosted an annual lesbian and gay film festival in the 1980s at the two cinemas the company ran in Philadelphia at that time: the TLA on South Street and the Roxy Screening Room on Sansom Street; however, it lacked the visibility, influence and longevity of the more recent festival.

== See also ==
- Philadelphia Asian American Film Festival
- Philadelphia Film Festival
