= David Kittredge =

American film director (born 1972)

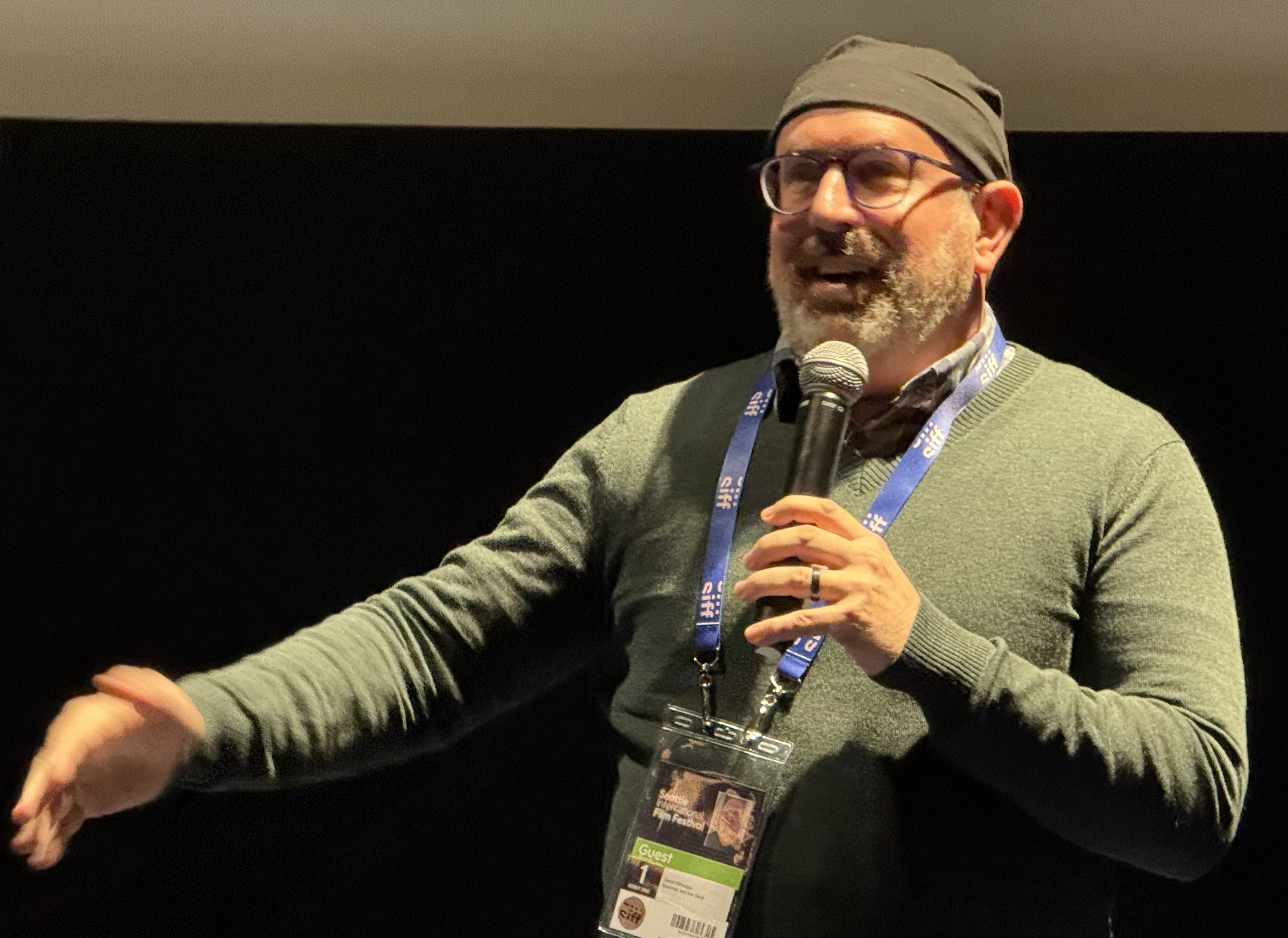
- Kittredge at the 2026 Seattle International Film Festival
- Born: April 4, 1972 (age 54)
- Occupations: Film director, editor, screenwriter
- Website: www.davidkittredge.com

David Kittredge (born April 4, 1972) is an American film director, editor and screenwriter. He earned his Bachelor of Arts from New York University's Tisch School of the Arts and is the owner and creative director of Triple Fire Productions, a Los Angeles–based production company.

His feature documentary Boorman and the Devil had its world premiere at the 82nd Venice International Film Festival on September 5, 2025. The film is about director John Boorman and how he made his 1977 film Exorcist II: The Heretic.

He is a producer on all four episodes of the 2022 Shudder original series Queer for Fear, which was executive produced by Bryan Fuller. Kittredge is the editor of the first two episodes and has additional editing credits on the latter two episodes.

In 2020, he became the producer and host of the podcast The Outcast Presented by Outfest, a podcast about LGBT content creators and their allies. Guests on the first season included Justin Simien, John Cameron Mitchell, Jonathan Groff, Michael Mayer, Christian Borle, Darryl Stephens, Christine Vachon, Jeffrey Schwarz, H.P. Mendoza, Jamie Babbit, Jim Fall, Miss Coco Peru, Laverne Cox and Shangela.

He was the editor of the new director's cut of 54, which took over six months to create and utilized over 40 minutes of footage not found in the film's theatrical release. The film premiered to acclaim at the 65th Berlin International Film Festival in February 2015.

His first feature as writer/director, Pornography: A Thriller, debuted at NewFest in June 2009 and was released on DVD by Wolfe Video July 13, 2010.

== Filmography ==
- Boorman and the Devil (feature film): Director, writer, producer, editor, 2025
- 54 (feature film): Editor (director's cut), 2015
- Pornography: A Thriller (feature film): Writer, director, co-editor, 2009
- Target Audience (short film): Writer, director, 2002
- Fairy Tale (short film): Writer, director, editor, composer, 1998
