= List of LGBTQ-related films of 2014 =

This is a list of lesbian, gay, bisexual, transgender or queer-related films released in 2014. It contains theatrically released films that deal with important gay, lesbian, bisexual, transgender or queer characters or issues and may have same-sex romance or relationships as a plot device.

== Films ==
Title	Director	Country	Genre	Cast	Notes	Ref
Aban and Khorshid	Darwin Serink	United States	Short, drama	Mojean Aria, Bobby Naderi		
A Noble Revolution (Una nobile rivoluzione)	Simone Cangelosi	Italy	Documentary	Marcella Di Folco, Porpora Marcasciano, Liliana Di Folco	83 mins long, Marcella Di Folco's Italian trans leader biography	
An Afternoon (En eftermiddag)	Søren Green	Denmark	Short, drama, romance	Ulrik Windfeldt-Schmidt, Jacob Ottensten	8 mins long, later added to Boys On Film 14: Worlds Collide compilation	
Alec Mapa: Baby Daddy	Andrea James	United States	Comedy	Alec Mapa	One-man show	
All Yours (Je suis à toi)	David Lambert	Belgium, Canada	Comedy-drama	Nahuel Pérez Biscayart, Jean-Michel Balthazar, Monia Chokri		
Appropriate Behavior	Desiree Akhavan	United States	Comedy	Desiree Akhavan, Scott Adsit, Rebecca Henderson, Halley Feiffer, Anh Duong, Hooman Majd, Arian Moayed, Aimee Mullins		
Barrio Boy	Dennis Shinners	United States	Short, drama	Dennis Garcia, Dan Leonard, Peter Olivera, Andrew Flores	8 mins long, in 2016 it was added to Boys On Film 14: Worlds Collide (compilation)	
Before the Last Curtain Falls (Bevor der letzte Vorhang fällt)	Thomas Wallner	Belgium, Germany, Canada	Documentary			
Boy Meets Girl	Eric Schaeffer	United States	Romance	Michelle Hendley, Michael Welch		
The Butchers	Steven Judd	United States	Horror	Semi Anthony, Damien Puckler, Randall Bosley, Cameron Bowen, Braxton Davis, Mara Hall, Jacob Hobbs, Tonya Kay		
The Case Against 8	Ben Cotner and Ryan White	United States	Documentary	Ted Olson, Christopher D. Dusseault, Jeffrey J. Zarrillo, Paul T. Katami, Kristin M. Perry, Sandra B. Stier, David Boies, Ted Uno, Chad Griffin - (American Foundation for Equal Rights co-founder), Kristina Schake - (American Foundation for Equal Rights co-founder), Adam Umhoefer, Elliott Perry, Frank Stier, Tom Stier and Spencer Perry		
The Circle (Der Kreis)	Stefan Haupt	Switzerland	Drama	Matthias Hungerbühler, Sven Schelker, Anatole Taubman, Peter Jecklin, Marianne Sägebrecht, Antoine Monot Jr., Marie Leuenberger	Teddy Award winner for Best Documentary	
Coming In	Marco Kreuzpaintner	Germany	Romantic comedy	Kostja Ullmann, Aylin Tezel, Ken Duken		
Date and Switch	Chris Nelson	United States	Comedy	Nicholas Braun, Hunter Cope, Dakota Johnson		
Death in Buenos Aires	Natalia Meta	Argentina	Drama, Suspense	Demián Bichir, Chino Darín, Mónica Antonópulos, Carlos Casella		
Do I Sound Gay?	David Thorpe	United States	Documentary	David Thorpe, Dan Savage, George Takei, David Sedaris, Tim Gunn, Margaret Cho		
Do Lado de Fora	Alexandre Carvalho	Brazil	Comedy	André Bankoff		
Drumline: A New Beat	Bille Woodruff	United States		Alexandra Shipp, Leonard Roberts, Jordan Calloway	TV movie	
Drunktown's Finest	Sydney Freeland	United States	Drama	Jeremiah Bitsui, Carmen Moore		
Dyke Hard	Bitte Andersson	Sweden	Comedy	Lina Kurttila, Peggy Sands, Maria Wågensjö, Alle Eriksson, Iki Gonzalez, Josephine Krieg, Anitha Nygårds, Ylva Maria Thompson, Ann-Charlotte Andersson, Jackson Bell, Joseph Huncovsky, Henry Miazga		
Feriado	Diego Araujo	Ecuador; Argentina	Drama	Juan Arregui, Elena Vargas, Cristina Morrison, Peki Andino, Canela Samaniego, Manuela Merchán, Irwin Ortiz, Francisco Perez, Sami Maigua, Anne-Dominique Correa, Amado Silva, Said López, Diego Andrés Paredes, Joshi Espinoza, Pepe Alvear, Andrés Crespo		
Fever (Fieber)	Elfi Mikesch	Austria	Drama	Eva Mattes, Martin Wuttke, Carolina Cardoso, Nicole Max, Sascha Ley, Nilton Martins		
Foxcatcher	Bennett Miller	United States	History, non-fiction, drama	Steve Carell, Channing Tatum, Mark Ruffalo, Sienna Miller, Vanessa Redgrave, Anthony Michael Hall, Guy Bond, Brett Rice, Brian Baumgartner	Loosely based on the events surrounding John du Pont's recruitment of Mark and David Schultz to help coach U.S. wrestlers for participation in competitive events, and du Pont's subsequent murder of David	
Four Moons	Terrence Moss	Mexico	Comedy, drama	Antonio Velázquez, Alejandro de la Madrid, Cesar Ramos, Gustavo Egelhaaf, Alonso Echánove, Alejandro Belmonte, Gabriel Santoyo, Sebastián Rivera, Mónica Dionne, Marta Aura, Jorge Luis Moreno, Hugo Catalán, Astrid Hadad, Luis Arrieta, Karina Gidi, Renato Bartilotti, Martín Barba	a.k.a. Cuatro Lunas	
Fred	John Fitzgerald Keitel	United States	Documentary	Fred Karger		
Futuro Beach	Karim Ainouz	Brazil	Drama	Wagner Moura, Clemens Schick, Jesuíta Barbosa	a.k.a. Praia do Futuro	
Gekijōban Zero	Mari Asato	Japan	Horror	Ayami Nakajō, Aoi Morikawa, Fujiko Kojima, Karen Miyama, Kasumi Yamaya, Minori Hagiwara, Yuri Nakamura, Kōdai Asaka, Noriko Nakagoshi, Jun Miho	Based on a novelization by Eiji Otsuka of the Fatal Frame video game series	
Girltrash: All Night Long	Alex Kondracke	United States	Musical, comedy	Lisa Rieffel, Michelle Lombardo, Gabrielle Christian, Mandy Musgrave, Kate French, Clementine Ford, Rose Rollins, Heather Thomas, Megan Cavanagh	Prequel to the webseries Girltrash!	
The Guest (La Visita)	Mauricio López Fernández	Chile	Drama	Daniela Vega, Claudia Cantero, Rosa Ramímez		
Guidance	Pat Mills	Canada	Comedy	Pat Mills, Kevin Hanchard, Maria Vacratsis, Allison Hossack		
Hidden Away (A escondidas)	Mikel Rueda	Spain	Drama	Germán Alcarazu, Adil Koukouh		
Hole	Martin Edralin	Canada	Short, drama	Ken Harrower, Sebastian Deery		
I Am Syd Stone	Denis Theriault	Canada	Short drama	Gharrett Patrick Paon, Michael Gaty		
The Imitation Game	Morten Tyldum	United Kingdom	Drama	Benedict Cumberbatch, Keira Knightley, Matthew Goode, Rory Kinnear, Allen Leech, Matthew Beard, Charles Dance, Mark Strong, James Northcote, Steven Waddington, Tom Goodman-Hill, Alex Lawther	Biopic of Alan Turing; based on the biography Alan Turing: The Enigma by Andrew Hodges	
Jongens (Boys)	Mischa Kamp	Netherlands	Drama	Gijs Blom, Ko Zandvliet		
Julia	Matthew A. Brown	United States	Horror	Ashley C. Williams, Tahyna Tozzi, Jack Noseworthy		
Kasal	Joselito Altarejos	Philippines	Drama	Arnold Reyes, Mhyco Aquino (credited as Oliver Aquino)		
Kidnapped for Christ	Kate S. Logan	United States	Documentary			
Land of Storms (Viharsarok)	Ádám Császi	Hungary	Drama	András Sütö, Ádám Varga, Sebastian Urzendowsky		
Lilting	Hong Khaou	United Kingdom	Drama	Ben Whishaw, Cheng Pei-pei		
Love Is Strange	Ira Sachs	United States	Drama	John Lithgow, Alfred Molina		
Love in the Time of Civil War (L'amour au temps de la guerre civile)	Rodrigue Jean	Canada	Drama	Alexandre Landry, Ana Christina Alva		
Mala Mala	Antonio Santini, Dan Sickles	Puerto Rico	Documentary	Jason Carrión, Samantha Close, Ivana Fred, Alberic Prados	Puerto Rico Queer FilmFest winner for Best Documentary	
Man on High Heels (Hai hil)	Jang Jin	South Korea	Drama	Cha Seung-won, Oh Jung-se, Esom		
The New Girlfriend	François Ozon	France	Drama	Romain Duris, Anaïs Demoustier, Raphaël Personnaz, Isild Le Besco, Aurore Clément	Based on the short story of the same name	
Night Flight (Ya Gan Bi Haeng)	Leesong Hee-il	South Korea	Drama	Kwak Si-yang, Lee Jae-joon		
The Normal Heart	Ryan Murphy	United States	Drama	Mark Ruffalo, Matt Bomer, Taylor Kitsch, Julia Roberts, Jim Parsons	Film adaptation of Larry Kramer's play The Normal Heart; HBO television film with a limited theatrical release.	
Papilio Buddha	Jayan K. Cherian	India	Drama	S. P. Sreekumar, David Briggs		
Pasolini	Abel Ferrara	France; Italy	Drama	Willem Dafoe, Maria de Medeiros, Riccardo Scamarcio, Ninetto Davoli		
Patong Girl	Susanna Salonen	Germany; Thailand	Drama	Maximilian Mauff, Aisawanya Areyawattana	Grimme-Preis 2016	
Pierrot Lunaire	Bruce LaBruce	Canada	Drama	Susanne Sachsse, Luizo Vega, Maria Ivanenko	Transgender-themed adaptation of Arnold Schoenberg's Pierrot Lunaire	
Predestination	The Spierig Brothers	Australia	Drama, science fiction, thriller	Ethan Hawke, Sarah Snook, Noah Taylor		
Pride	Matthew Warchus	United Kingdom	Drama	Bill Nighy, Dominic West, Andrew Scott, George MacKay, Imelda Staunton		
San Cristóbal	Omar Zúñiga Hidalgo	Chile	Drama, short	Samuel González, Antonio Altamirano	Later released as a full-length film in 2019. Winner of 2015 Teddy Award	
Sand Dollars (Dólares de Arena)	Laura Amelia Guzmán, Israel Cárdenas	Dominican Republic	Drama	Geraldine Chaplin, Yanet Mojica		
The Skeleton Twins	Craig Johnson	United States	Comedy, drama	Bill Hader, Kristen Wiig, Luke Wilson		
Snowflake	Francesco Roder	Italy	Drama, short	Ele Keats, Tracy Middendorf, Sara Lavner		
Something Must Break (Nånting Måste Gå Sönder)	Ester Martin Bergsmark	Sweden	Drama	Saga Becker, Iggy Malmborg, Shima Niavarani, Mattias Åhlén, Daniel Nyström, Emil Almén, Axel Petersén	It is based on the novel You Are the Roots That Sleep at My Feet and Keep the Earth in Place by Eli Levén	
Der Spalt	Kim Schicklang	Germany	Drama	Marie Fischer, Folker Dücker, Dorothea Baltzer, Trischa Dorner, Yana Robin La Baume		
Stories of Our Lives	Jim Chuchu, The Nest Collective	Kenya	anthology of 5 Shorts	Kelly Gichohi, Paul Ogola, Tim Mutungi, Mugambi Nthiga, Rose Njenga, Janice Mugo, Allan Weku, Maina Olwenya, Louis Brooke, Judy Gichohi	Won a Jury Prize from the Teddy Award jury at the 65th Berlin International Film Festival and came second in the Panorama Audience Award	
Summer Nights (Les nuits d'été)	Mario Fanfani	France	Drama	Guillaume de Tonquédec, Jeanne Balibar		
Tiger Orange	Wade Gasque	United States	Drama	Mark Strano, Frankie Valenti		
To Be Takei	Jennifer M. Kroot	United States	Documentary	George Takei		
To Russia with Love	Noam Gonick	United States; Canada	Documentary	Johnny Weir, Anastasia Bucsis, Belle Brockhoff, Blake Skjellerup		
The Torture Club	Kota Yoshida	Japan	Romance	Noriko Kijima	Based on a manga	
Two 4 One	Maureen Bradley	Canada	Romance, comedy, drama	Gavin Crawford, Naomi Snieckus, Gabrielle Rose		
Unfriend	Joselito Altarejos	Philippines	Drama	Angelo Ilagan, Boots Anson-Roa, Sandino Martin		
The Way He Looks (Hoje Eu Quero Voltar Sozinho)	Daniel Ribeiro	Brazil	Drama	Ghilherme Lobo, Fabio Audi	Based on Ribeiro's 2010 short film I Don't Want to Go Back Alone; Teddy Award winner for Best Feature Film	
What We Have (Ce qu'on a)	Maxime Desmons	Canada	Drama	Maxime Desmons, Alex Ozerov, Roberta Maxwell		
Yves Saint Laurent	Jalil Lespert	France	Drama	Pierre Niney, Guillaume Gallienne	Biopic of fashion designer Yves Saint Laurent	
