= Altarejos (disambiguation) =

Altarejos may refer to:

== Places ==
- Altarejos, a municipality in the Province of Cuenca, Castilla–La Mancha, Spain.

de Altarejos

- Mota de Altarejos, a municipality in Cuenca, Castile–La Mancha, Spain
- Fresneda de Altarejos, a municipality in Cuenca, Castile–La Mancha, Spain

== People with the surname ==
- Joselito Altarejos, Filipino filmmaker
