= New Horizons Youth Ministries =

Christian organization

New Horizons Youth Ministries was a Christian organization focused on child reform headquartered in Marion, Indiana and was shut down when the state of Indiana revoked its license as a childcare facility in 2009.

It was founded by Gordon C. Blossom (1921 - 1996).

Blossom developed the controversial "Culture Shock Therapy" and "Christian Milieu Therapy". New Horizons Youth Ministries was founded in 1971 in Grand Rapids, MI with his son Timothy G. Blossom, operating an overseas facility called Caribe Vista Youth Safari located in Port-au-Prince, Haiti. After facing the threat of immediate deportation of 43 staff and students due to failure to reinstate visas for over two years, the school relocated to La Vega, Dominican Republic and eventually settled in the remote mountain regions of Jarabacoa, Dominican Republic, calling itself Caribe Vista School/Escuela Caribe, described in the film Kidnapped for Christ and the bestseller Jesus Land.

Thousands of former students and parents of the students have alleged experiencing and witnessing widespread psychological, emotional, physical and sexual abuse.
