= André Bankoff =

Brazilian actor (born 1978)

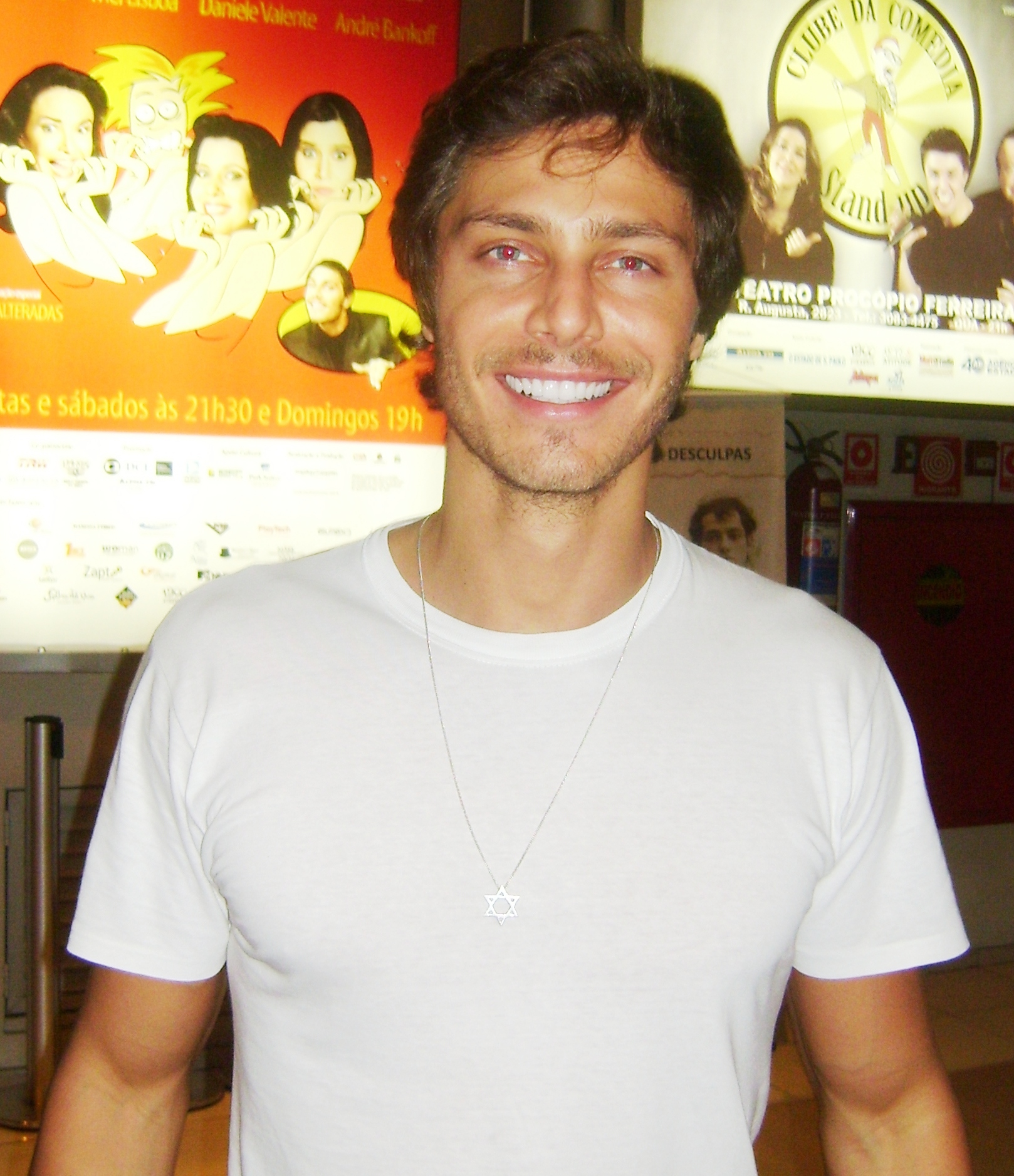
- Bankoff in December 2010
- Born: André Ricardo Bankoff; July 20, 1978 (age 47); Americana, São Paulo, Brazil
- Occupation: Actor
- Years active: 2005-present

André Ricardo Bankoff (born July 20, 1978) is a Brazilian actor and former model.

== Early life and career ==
Bankoff was born to a family of Bulgarian Romani and Ukrainian Jewish background. In 1999, he appeared at the São Paulo Fashion Week (then known as MorumbiFashion).

In 2005, Bankoff retired from the modelling industry to pursue a career in acting. He appeared in the miniseries Mad Maria and the soap opera Bang Bang, both on Rede Globo. In Bicho do Mato (2006), he played Juba, the protagonist.

Bankoff worked as a model and did commercials for television. He studied theater in the workshop of Rede Globo for eight months. He joined the cast of Xuxa popstar in 2000 and also presented the program for some time Moto'n Roll, the channel subscription SporTV.

Before acting, Bankoff pursued a career in football. He played in the Ponte Preta and had a brief stint at Associazione Sportiva Roma, Italy.

In 2007, he was cast in the soap opera Amor e Intrigas as Pedro. He also appeared as André Campos in the telenovela Poder Paralelo.

In 2011 he played Tiago in the soap opera Morde & Assopra. He was confirmed in the cast of Saramandaia in 2013.

== Filmography ==
=== Television ===
Year	Title	Role	Notes
2002	Moto 'n Roll	Presenter	
2005	Mad Maria	Werner	
2005	Bang Bang	Peter Johnson "Pete"	Episodes: "December 1–27"
2006	Bicho do Mato	Lucas Medeiros Redenção "Juba"	
2007	Alta Estação	Júlio	Episode: "June 1st"
2007	Amor e Intrigas	Pedro Camargo de Souza	
2009	Poder Paralelo	André Campos	
2011	Morde & Assopra	Tiago Guedes	
2012	Louco por Elas	Rodriguinho	Episode: "Léo Faz Giovana Abrir o Jogo"
2013	Saramandaia	Pedro Vilar	
2014	O Negócio	Léo	Episode: "Topo"
2015	Babilônia	Pedro Carvalho	
2016	Tempero Secreto	Nuno	
2016	Vai Que Cola	Breno	Episode: "Junto e Separado"
2017	Mister Brau	Vicente	Episode: "April 18"
2017	Manual para se Defender de Aliens, Ninjas e Zumbis	Davi	Episode: "Ctrl + Alt + Del"
2017	Adotada	Himself	Episode: "Família Suconic"
2018	Rotas do Ódio	Gustavo Zooter / Jason	
2018	Terrores Urbanos	Marcos Avelar	Episode: "O Boneco"
2018	Amigo de Aluguel	Gastão Diamante	Episode: "O Herdeiro"
2019	Jezabel	Ahab	
2024	A Rainha da Pérsia	Mordecai	

=== Film ===
Year	Title	Role
2000	Xuxa Popstar	Model
2014	Do Lado de Fora	Roger
2017	Gostosas, Lindas & Sexies	Daniel
2017	Os Parças	Marcelo
2019	Bate Coração	Sandro
2021	Reação em Cadeia	Zulu

Music Videos

Year	Song	Artist
2015	Deixa Ele Sofrer	Anitta

== Stage ==
Year	Title	Role
2010	Mulheres Alteradas	Marcos
2014	Hell'	Andrea
2014	Não Existe Mulher Difícil	Various characters
2016	Jogo Aberto	Sérgio
2016	A Reação	Tristan

== Awards and nominations ==
Year	Award	Category	Work nominated	Result
2022	Festival Sesc Melhores Filmes	Best National Actor	Reação em Cadeia	Pending
