= Kidnapped for Christ =

- Directed by: Kate S. Logan
- Written by: Yada Zamora
- Produced by: Yada Zamora; Paul Levin; Kate S. Logan
- Cinematography: Peter Borrud; Stash Slionski
- Edited by: H. Dwight Raymond III; Sean Yates
- Music by: Joseph DeBeasi
- Release date: January 17, 2014 (Slamdance)
- Running time: 85 minutes
- Country: United States
- Language: English

Kidnapped for Christ is a documentary film that details the experiences of several teenagers who were removed from their homes and sent to a behavior modification and ex-gay school in Jarabacoa, Dominican Republic. The film was directed by Kate Logan. Tom DeSanto, Lance Bass and Mike Manning are the executive producers.

The film premiered at the Slamdance Film Festival in Park City, Utah, in January 2014.

== Background ==
Escuela Caribe, also known as Caribe Vista School, was a boarding school for "troubled" teens near the mountain community of Jarabacoa in the Dominican Republic owned by Marion, Indiana–based New Horizons Youth Ministries, an evangelical organization originally headquartered in Grand Rapids, Michigan. The school was originally located in Port-au-Prince, Haiti, founded by Pastor Gordon Blossom in 1971 and known as Caribe Vista Youth Safari. The ministry moved temporarily to La Vega, Dominican Republic. Eventually the school would change names to Caribe Vista School/ Escuela Caribe, settling in Jarabacoa on a remote 30-acre fenced campus that typically housed around 45 students at one time. Blossom developed the school's program, calling it "Culture Shock Therapy" or "Christian Milieu Therapy". According to former students of Escuela Caribe, they were subjected to a range of abuses including intense forced labor and repetitive exercise, physical beatings (called "swats"), extreme isolation, and various forms of emotional abuse.

In 2011, Escuela Caribe and New Horizons closed, transferring the property to another Christian ministry called Crosswinds, which reopened the school under the name Caribbean Mountain Academy. Although their website states their program is not affiliated with New Horizons Youth Ministries, as of 2014 (the year of the film's release) at least five staff members from Escuela Caribe remained employed at the school after the transition.

== Plot ==
The documentary details the experiences of several teenagers who were enrolled into Escuela Caribe by their parents against their will. The film focuses on the plight of a Colorado high school student, David, sent to the school by his parents after he told them he was gay. The film also documents the experiences of two girls: Beth, who was sent to the school because of a "debilitating anxiety disorder", and Tai, who was sent for behavioral problems resulting from childhood trauma.

== Development ==
Logan did not initially know of the school's controversial nature, and the original premise was not an exposé on the school, but rather a short film about troubled teens getting their lives back on track through Christian therapy and cultural exchange. Footage for the documentary was shot at the school during a seven-week period in 2006. Director Kate Logan interviewed former students including Julia Scheeres, author of the bestseller Jesus Land, who was subjected to the school's abuse in the 1980s. Manning became involved in the project when one of the subjects mentioned it to him. In turn, Manning brought it to the attention of Bass and DeSanto.

Logan made use of a Kickstarter campaign and two Indiegogo campaigns to raise funds. The Kickstarter campaign, which was to raise funding to complete editing, exceeded its $25,000 goal and raised $34,075 by January 1, 2014. Logan said that the campaigns were a full-time job, but they gave her a built-in audience that she would not otherwise have had.

== Release ==
A test screening of the film was given at the Sacramento International Gay and Lesbian Film Festival in October 2013.

It premiered at the Slamdance Film Festival at the Treasure Mountain Inn in Park City, Utah, on January 17, 2014. The film was one of only eight documentaries that were chosen from 5,000 films submitted for the festival. It won "Audience Award Best Feature Documentary".

In July 2014, Showtime began showing the film, including on its sister channels Showtime 2, Showtime NEXT, and Showcase and via their on-demand service.

== See also ==
- Conversion therapy
- Latter Days
- List of lesbian, gay, bisexual or transgender-related films of 2014
