= Christina Baker Kline =

American novelist

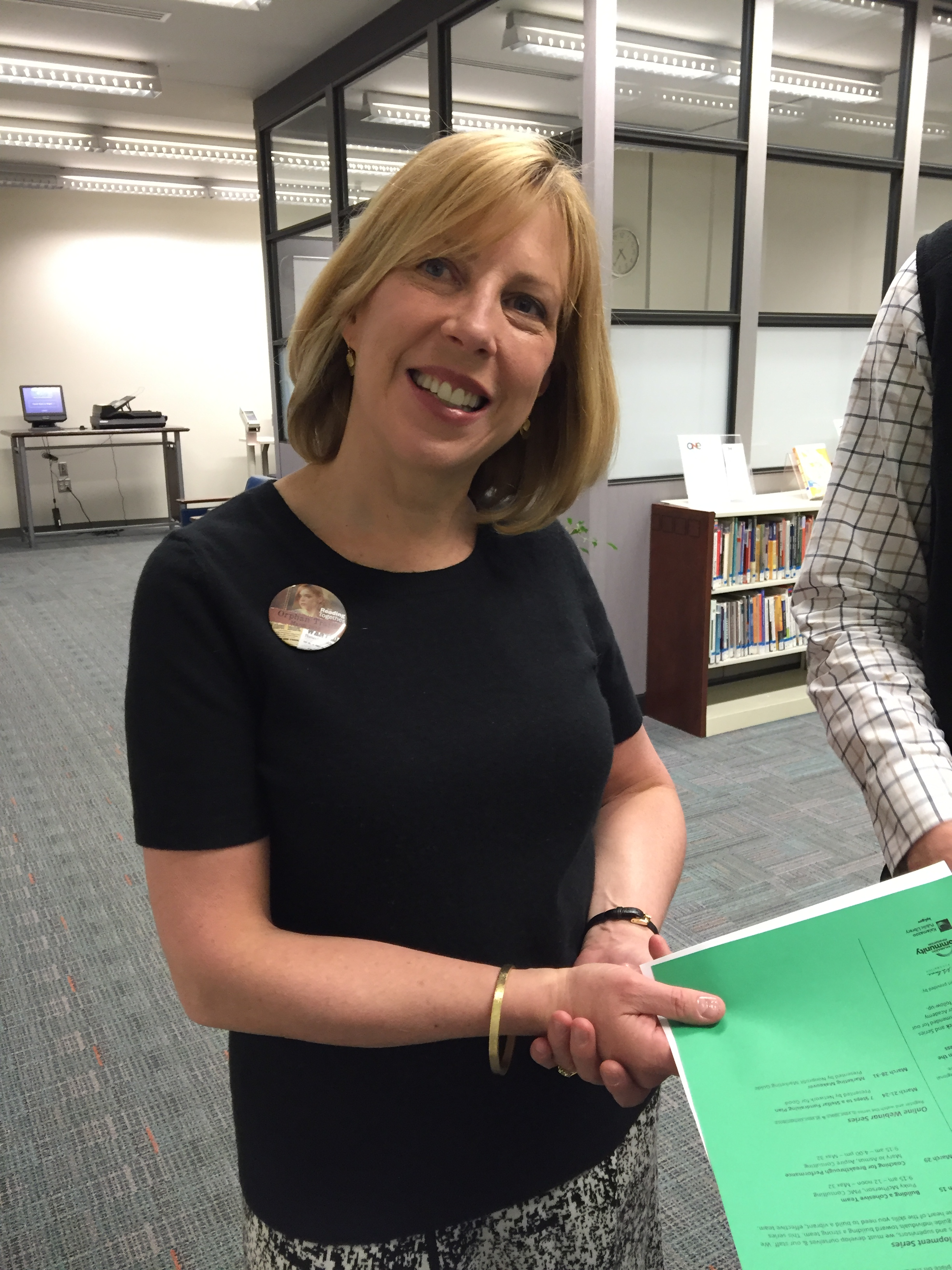
- Kline at the Kalamazoo Public Library in 2016
- Born: 1964 (age 61–62); Cambridge, England
- Education: Yale University (BA); University of Cambridge (MA); University of Virginia (MFA)
- Occupation: Novelist
- Website: christinabakerkline.com

Christina Baker Kline (born 1964) is an American novelist. She is the author of seven novels, including Orphan Train, and has co-authored or edited five non-fiction books.

Kline is a Geraldine R. Dodge Foundation Fellowship and Virginia Center for the Creative Arts recipient.

== Background ==
She was born in Cambridge, England, and raised in Cambridge, the American South, and in Maine. She is a graduate of Yale University (BA in English), Cambridge University (MA in literature), and the University of Virginia (MFA), where she was a Henry Hoyns Fellow in fiction writing.

Kline has been a resident of Montclair, New Jersey.

== Teaching career ==
Kline served as Writer-in-Residence at Fordham University from 2007 to 2011, where she taught graduate and undergraduate creative writing and literature.

== Works ==
=== Fiction ===
- Sweet Water (1993)
- Desire Lines (1999)
- The Way Life Should Be (2007)
- Bird in Hand (2009)
- Orphan Train (2013)
- A Piece of the World (2017)
- Orphan Train Girl (2017)
- The Exiles (2020)
- The Foursome (2026)

==== Orphan Train ====
Set on present-day Mount Desert Island, Maine and in Depression-era Minnesota, Kline's fifth novel, Orphan Train, highlights the real-life story of the orphan trains that between 1854 and 1929 carried thousands of orphaned, abandoned, and destitute children from the East Coast to the Midwest. Since its publication in 2013, Orphan Train has been a bestseller on all the national lists in the U.S.

=== Non-fiction ===
- The Conversation Begins: Mothers and Daughters Talk about Living Feminism (1994), with her mother, Christina Looper Baker.

=== As editor ===
- Child of Mine: Original Essays on Becoming a Mother (1997)
- Room to Grow: Twenty-Two Writers Encounter the Pleasures and Paradoxes of Raising Young Children (1999)
- Always Too Soon: Voices of Support for Those Who Have Lost Both Parents (2006), with Allison Gilbert
- About Face: Women Write about What They See When They Look in the Mirror (2008), with Anne Burt

== Me Too campaign ==
As part of the #MeToo campaign, in late October 2017, Baker Kline penned an essay published by Slate magazine in which she accused former president George H. W. Bush of inappropriately touching her and telling an inappropriate joke while she posed for a photo with him during an April 2014 event benefiting the Barbara Bush Foundation for Family Literacy. She further stated that the driver who chauffeured her (and had "introduced herself as a friend of the Bush family"), overheard her tell the story to her husband and requested that she remain "discreet" about the incident. Baker Kline stated in her essay that the driver's reaction made her suspicious that her case was not unique, thinking that "the people around President Bush were accustomed to doing damage control," and the #MeToo campaign confirmed her suspicions.
