= The Man in the Lighthouse =

The Man in the Lighthouse (Ang Lalake sa Parola)
- Theatrical release poster
- Directed by: Joselito Altarejos
- Written by: Lex Bonife (story and screenplay); Joselito Altarejos (story)
- Produced by: Vicente G. del Rosario III (producer); Vic del Rosario Jr. (executive producer); Hermie Go (associate producer); Jonathan Ling V. Aligada and Joselito Altarejos (line producers)
- Starring: Harry Laurel; Justin De Leon; Jennifer Lee
- Cinematography: Arvin Viola (director of photography)
- Edited by: Sherwin Pescasio
- Music by: Richard Gonzales
- Release date: 2007
- Running time: 108 minutes
- Language: Tagalog

Ang Lalake sa Parola, English title The Man in the Lighthouse is a 2007-independent gay-themed Filipino film directed by Filipino film director Joselito Altarejos, a homoerotic journey in finding one's true self and the memories and recollections that stay with us till the end. The film stars Harry Laurel, Jennifer Lee and Justin De Leon.

Some of the overtly sexual scenes were removed from the original for the general theatrical release in the Philippines, but were made available on the eventual video releases. Filipino actor Harry Laurel appears in full-frontal nudity in the film.

== Synopsis ==
It is a story of relationships in a small town called Lobo most known for its lighthouse and the local legend says that it is inhabited by a fairy who seduces desirable men who then never marry.

Mateo (Harry Laurel) has been searching for his father Fernando (Richard Quan) who left when he was five. His search leads him to Lobo. Awaiting his father's return, Mateo agrees to work as the caretaker of the lighthouse. Although he is courting Suzette (Jennifer Lee), a teacher in the town, his meeting with Jerome (Justin de Leon), a gay man from Manila discovers them making love.

What follows from this accidental meeting of Mateo and Jerome is the beginning of a homoerotic journey, while Suzette desperately longs for love and Mateo's attention. Mateo is also affected by Perida (Monti Parungao), a local gay man, who has to pay local teenage boys for sex, as he opens up to Mateo about his suffering as a gay man.

What begins as a search for one's father evolves into a search for one's own self, putting Mateo in a dilemma, in the midst of his conservative rural community, and should he cross the thin line between being straight and being gay?

== Cast ==
- Harry Laurel as Mateo
- Jennifer Lee as Suzette
- Justin De Leon as Jerome
- Crispin Pineda as Tisho
- Allan Paule as Young Tisho
- Sheree as Diwata
- Richard Quan as Fernando Atienza
- Monti Parungao as Perida
- Dexter Doria as Lucy
- Micol Manansala as Hilario
- Wilma Lusanta as Mrs. Atienza
- Sean Michael Valera as Ronnel
- Mariel Valera as Anna
- Arman Enriquez as Arman
- Arvin Reyes as Boy who had sex with Perida
- May-i Fabros as May-i
- Lex Bonife as Jamir
- Anna Liao as Aya
- Benjie Hilado as Carlos
- Dax Alejandro as Fidel

== Award nominations ==
- 2008: Nominated for "Best Production Design" (for Ma. Asuncion Torres and Anna Carmela Manda) during the Philippines FAP Awards
- 2008: Nominated for "Best Performance by an Actor in a Supporting Role in a Drama, Musical or Comedy" (for Justin De Leon) during the Philippines Golden Screen Awards

== See also ==
- List of Filipino films
- List of lesbian, gay, bisexual or transgender-related films
- List of lesbian, gay, bisexual, or transgender-related films by storyline
- List of Philippine films of the 2000s
- Nudity in film (East Asian cinema since 1929)
