= O Bando do Velho Jack =

Brazilian rock/blues band

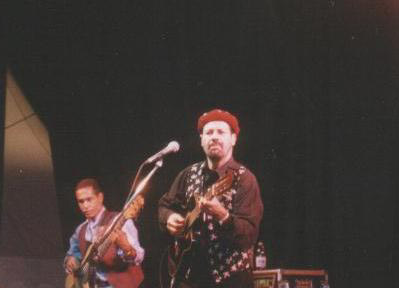

Background information
- Origin: Campo Grande, MS, Brazil
- Genres: Blues, classic rock and southern rock
- Years active: 1995–present
- Members: Rodrigo Tozzette; Fábio Terra; Marcos Yallouz; João Bosco; Alex Cavalheri
- Past members: Gilson Júnior; Fábio Brum; Alex Batata (in memoriam)
- Website: www.velhojack.com.br

O Bando do Velho Jack (in English: "Old Jack's Gang" or "Old Jack's Band"), or simply "O Bando", is a Brazilian rock/blues band formed in 1995 in the city of Campo Grande, capital of the Mato Grosso do Sul state, located in the central-west region of Brazil.

The band's name is a reference to the famous Tennessee whiskey Jack Daniel's. Considered one of the most influent bands on the Brazilian classic rock music scenario, the band has five albums (four officially released), mixing autoral music with some covers.

== History ==
The band was formed in 1995 from the union of two bands: "Blues Band", as the name says a blues band, and "Alta Tensão" (in English: "High Tension"), a heavy metal band. The first formation was: Alex Batata (lead singer and harmonica), Fábio Brum (guitar), Marcos Yallouz (bass guitar), and João Bosco (drums).

In January 1997, Fábio Brum goes to the United States of America, and in his place enters Fábio Terra, a.k.a. "Corvo" (in English: "Crow"), bringing a more heavy style to the band. In June 1997, lead singer Alex Batata is cowardly murdered.

After this episode, the band enters in a short hiatus period before coming back to the stage. Soon after, Rodrigo Tozzette enters as the lead singer and Gilson Júnior in the keyboard. In 2000, Gilson is replaced by Alex Cavalheri, a.k.a. "Fralda" (in English: "Diaper").

== Style ==
The style of the band is a mixture of blues with classic and southern rock, and its main influences are bands such as Grand Funk Railroad, The Beatles, Led Zeppelin, Creedence Clearwater Revival, Free, Doobie Brothers, The Allman Brothers Band, Lynyrd Skynyrd, Black Oak Arkansas, The Black Crowes, The Who, ZZ Top, Cream, Os Mutantes, Secos & Molhados and Casa das Máquinas.

== Current members ==
- Rodrigo Tozzette – lead singer and rhythm guitar
- Fábio Terra – singer and guitar
- Marcos Yallouz – bass guitar
- Alex Cavalheri – keyboard

== Former members ==
- Gilson Júnior – keyboard
- Fábio Brum – guitar
- Alex Batata – lead singer (in memoriam)
- João Bosco – drums

== Discography ==
- 1998 – Old Jack (not officially released)
- 1999 – Procurado
- 2002 – Como ser Feliz ganhando Pouco
- 2004 – Ao Vivo e Acústico no Som do Mato
- 2007 – Bicho do Mato

== Official website ==
In Portuguese: www.velhojack.com.br
