= Procurado =

Studio album by O Bando do Velho Jack
- Released: 1999
- Genres: Blues, Rock

O Bando do Velho Jack chronology
Old Jack (1998)	Procurado (1999)	Como ser Feliz ganhando Pouco (2002)

Procurado is the second album from Brazilian blues/rock band O Bando do Velho Jack, and was released in 1999.

== Track listing ==
1. "Cão de guarda"
2. "Trem do pantanal"
3. "De ninguém"
4. "I Fell Free"
5. "Ando meio desligado"
6. "Corda bamba"
7. "Born to Be Wild"
8. "Dreams"
9. "Palavras erradas"
10. "A minha vida é rock and roll"
11. "Dead Flowers"
12. "Great Balls of Fire"
