= Unfriend (film) =

2014 film

- Directed by: Joselito Altarejos
- Written by: Zig Madamba Dulay
- Starring: Angelo Ilagan
- Release dates: February 8, 2014 (Berlin); February 26, 2014 (Philippines)
- Running time: 93 minutes
- Country: Philippines
- Language: Filipino

Unfriend is a 2014 Philippine drama film directed by Joselito Altarejos. The film had its premiere in the Panorama section of the 64th Berlin International Film Festival.

== Synopsis ==
On Christmas Day, David, 15, finds out that his boyfriend, Jonathan, 17, has taken another lover. The discovery leads him on the brink of depression making him think of ways to have him back at all cost. He has invited Jonathan to see him on this day for the last time. And through the frenzy of his preparations prior to meeting Jonathan, we will discover his traits and personality; the 'worlds' he lives in - virtual and real; and, we will witness how he prepares for his most unique shout-out that he will make not only on his Facebook wall, but, in his life.

== Cast ==
- Angelo Ilagan
- Boots Anson-Roa
- Sandino Martin

== See also ==
- List of lesbian, gay, bisexual or transgender-related films of 2014
