= Mitchell Stephens (academic) =

Professor of journalism and mass communications at NYU

Mitchell Stephens (born August 16, 1949) is an American professor of journalism and mass communications at New York University's Arthur L. Carter Journalism Institute. He is also a respected journalist and historian with several original published works.

== Personal life ==
Mitchell Stephens was born in New York City, and was raised in Manhattan, Queens, and Long Island. His father was Bernard Stephens (1917–1990), a labor newspaper editor. His mother, Lillian Stephens, was a retired professor of education, and lived on Long Island. He has one sibling, a sister, Beth Stephens, who is an international human rights lawyer and law professor at Rutgers in Camden, New Jersey.

He is a fan of the New York Mets, and he won the team's Banner Day contest as a teenager with a sign reading "Extremism in Defense of the Mets Is No Vice", a parody of a line from Barry Goldwater's speech at the 1964 Republican National Convention.

He attended The Wheatley School, a public school in Old Westbury, New York, and graduated in 1967. He graduated from Haverford College in 1971, with honors in English. In 1973 he graduated from UCLA with a masters in Journalism, and received the Edward R. Murrow Award for best student in broadcast journalism.

His wife is Esther Davidowitz, magazine writer and editor, and currently editor-in-chief of Westchester Magazine. They have three children: Noah, Lauren, and Seth Stephens-Davidowitz.

== The Rise of the Image, the Fall of the Word ==
In The Rise of the Image, the Fall of the Word (Oxford University Press, 1998), Stephens describes how pictures, symbols and photos are replacing words as our primary communication medium. Stephens pointed out that the opposite transformation happened over several millennia as our oral culture (based on long tales and poems detailing people's history)was displaced by writing and then the printing press and mass literacy. This process was not completed till the 1930s in some parts of the world e.g. central Russia.

The move toward a more visual culture began with the invention of photography and films; but really took off with the invention of Television which took just eight years to enter half of American homes. He uses statistics to show the plummeting number of Americans who read regularly and while conceding that he himself is a book lover, he thinks it pointless to resist the process. He details how all new media provokes outrage initially: opera, printing, writing, photography, phones. Even paper was banned in 1231 by Holy Roman Emperor Frederick II! For Mitchell Stephens, pictures best attributes are that they can give you far more information and faster than words. It was written just as the number of TV channels was exploding but for Mitchell, even 500 channels is not enough to compete with the complexity of a bookstore, we need more! Mitchell is excited about the potential of what he calls 'new video'. For a long time, writing was only used for market records, it was a long time before we saw poems and novels. Stephens posited that films and TV started off resembling plays but are now evolving in brand new ways (photomontage in Eisenstein's films was the first sign of this) just as words did.

Mitchell made a startingly accurate prediction in the intro: "Perhaps we will soon locate our video at sites on the World Wide Web". Seven years later, YouTube was created.

== Recent work ==
He has also contributes regularly on journalism and contemporary thought in the media, including The New York Times, Los Angeles Times Magazine, Journalism Quarterly, Chicago Tribune, and The Washington Post.

Many of Stephens' journalistic arguments stem from a reaction to works by journalists such as famed critic Neil Postman (author of "Amusing Ourselves to Death: Public Discourse in the Age of Show Business"). Stephens contends that television, like many previous forms of media, is stuck in an 'imitation' stage of development, and we have thus not seen its proper use.

Stephens has completed a journey around the world (December 2000 to August 2001), working on the theories of cultural homogenization and travel itself. His work related to his travels through 38 countries by cars, buses, boats, trains, ferries, freighters, and by foot can be seen in FEED magazine, LonelyPlanet.com, ROADthinker.com, ideaVIDEO.com, and in "Marketplace" reports for public radio.

== Published work ==
Stephens has published many books and textbooks on journalism, including:

- The Voice of America: Lowell Thomas and the Invention of 20th Century Journalism (St. Martin's Press, 2017)
- Without Gods: Toward a History of Disbelief - blog chronicling the writing of his next book, a history of atheism (to be published by Carroll & Graf)
- The Rise of the Image, the Fall of the Word (Oxford University Press, 1998)
- A History of News (Viking, 1988)
- Writing and Reporting the News (Holt, Rinehart and Winston, 1986)
- Broadcast News (Holt, Rinehart and Winston, 1981)
- Covering Catastrophe: Broadcast Journalists Report September 11 with co editors Allison Gilbert, Phil Hirschkorn, Melinda Murphy and Robyn Walensky.
