= Melinda Murphy =

Melinda Murphy was born in December 1963. She is the General Manager of Planet Murph Media. Her two main clients are VanMedia Group where she is a senior media trainer who teaches communication skills to executives, and American Association of Singapore where she serves as general manager.

== Career ==
Prior to launching Planet Murph Media Melinda was an executive producer and special projects manager for Expat Living, a lifestyle magazine in Singapore.

In the US Murphy was a correspondent for The Early Show between 2002 and 2006.

She graduated from Texas A&M with a journalism degree in 1986.

== Published works ==
In 2002 Murphy co-edited "Covering Catastrophe: Broadcast Journalists Report September 11"—a collection of accounts from Allison Gilbert, Phil Hirschkorn, Mitchell Stephens and Robyn Walensky.

Murphy has also contributed chapters to three other books, "Broadcasting Through Crisis," "On Camera: How to Report, Anchor and Interview," and "Living in Singapore." She has been the publishing editor of three editions of "Living in Singapore" reference guide.

== Personal ==
She is married and has two children.
