= A Thousand Lives =

2011 book by Julia Scheeres

A Thousand Lives: The Untold Story of Jonestown
- First edition cover
- Author: Julia Scheeres
- Language: English
- Subject: the Jonestown massacre
- Genre: narrative nonfiction
- Publisher: Free Press
- Publication date: October 2011, hardcover
- Pages: 307pp
- ISBN: 978-1-4165-9639-4

A Thousand Lives: The Untold Story of Jonestown (2011) is a history of the Jonestown settlement and massacre in 1978. Written by journalist Julia Scheeres, the book chronicles the lives of five people who resided in Jonestown before the mass murder-suicides that claimed 918 lives.

== Background ==
While researching another book, Julia Scheeres, the author of the memoir Jesus Land, learned that the FBI had recently released 50,000 pages of documents that agents found in Jonestown, everything from shipping manifests to notes to Jim Jones from residents pleading with him to let them go home. It took her a year to read and organize the FBI files, which she acquired under the Freedom of Information Act, and two more years to write the book.

== Synopsis ==
A Thousand Lives focuses on five people: Edith Roller, Stanley Clayton, Hyacinth Thrash and Jim and Tommy Bogue. Together they represent the varied demographics of Peoples Temple, Jim Jones' church. Roller and the Bogues are white, while Clayton and Thrash are African American. The book explores how so many people—black, white, middle class, poor, educated and unschooled—ended up dying in Jonestown. Using diaries and other primary sources as well as hundreds of hours of interviews, Scheeres presents a heart-breaking portrait of belief, survival and loss in this idyllic community.

== Reception ==
The book was critically acclaimed and widely reviewed. The San Francisco Chronicle wrote that it was "Riveting... unforgettable... heart-breaking... bone-chilling. You will not be able to look away." The Los Angeles Times Book Review wrote, "Scheeres convincingly portrays the members of this community as victims, not fools. It's hard to imagine how people might be so browbeaten, afraid and misled that they would bring about their own deaths—but Scheeres has made that terrifying story believable and human."

== Awards ==
- Best Nonfiction Book of 2012, the Northern California Independent Booksellers' Association
- San Francisco Chronicle, list of 100 best books of 2011
- The Boston Globe, list of best non-fiction books of 2011
