= Ao Vivo e Acústico no Som do Mato =

Studio album by O Bando do Velho Jack
- Released: 2004

O Bando do Velho Jack chronology
Como ser Feliz ganhando Pouco (2002)	Ao Vivo e Acústico no Som do Mato (2004)	Bicho do Mato (2007)

Ao Vivo e Acústico no Som do Mato is the fourth album from Brazilian blues/rock band O Bando do Velho Jack, and was released in 2004. This album was recorded live and unplugged, and was also released in DVD.

== Track listing ==
1. "Sangue latino"
2. "Ticket to Ride"
3. "Cavaleiro da lua"
4. "All My Love"
5. "Great Balls of Fire"
6. "Palavras erradas"
7. "Corda bamba"
8. "Como ser feliz ganhando pouco"
9. "Longe de você"
10. "Cão de guarda"
11. "Proud Mary"
12. "Trem do Pantanal"
