= Shamaine Buencamino =

Filipina actress

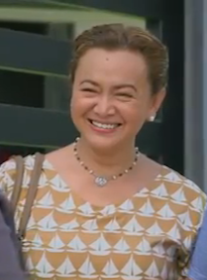
- Centenera-Buencamino in 2017
- Born: Shamaine Centenera; February 28, 1965 (age 61); Naga City, Camarines Sur, Philippines
- Other names: Shamaine, Sharmaine, Charmaine
- Education: University of the Philippines Diliman
- Occupations: Actress; Film actress
- Years active: 1995–present
- Spouse: Nonie Buencamino (m. 1990)
- Children: 4 (incl. Julia Buencamino)

Shamaine Centenera-Buencamino (born February 28, 1965) is a Filipino actress and mental health advocate who has appeared in more than 100 movies and television series and shows. She played the role of Virginia 'Virgie' Arevalo in the primetime action-drama series FPJ's Ang Probinsyano.

== Personal life ==
She married Filipino actor Nonie Buencamino and has four children, including the actress Julia Buencamino, who died by suicide in 2015.

== Filmography ==
=== Film ===
Year	Title	Role
1998	Hiling	Rica
1999	Kiss Mo 'Ko	
2002	Small Voices	Adong's mom
2003	Crying Ladies	Cecile
2006	Ang Pamana: The Inheritance	Martha
2007	Ang Cute Ng Ina Mo	Imelda Marcos
2007	Ouija	Elvyra
2007	One More Chance	Rose
2008	Concerto	
2008	Ang Lihim ni Antonio	Tere
2009	In My Life	Noel's mother
2010	Babe, I Love You	Margarita
2010	Cinco	Kaye's mother
2011	Niño	
2011	Ikaw ang Pag-ibig	
2012	REquieme!	
2013	David F.	
2013	Instant Mommy	Mrs. Cruz
2013	Barber's Tales	Tess
2013	How to Disappear Completely	
2013	Pagpag: Siyam na Buhay	Evelyn
2014	Maybe This Time	Lenny
2014	Alienasyon	
2014	Tres	Dr. Lazaro's wife
2014	Lorna	Lorna
2015	Bambanti	Martha
2015	A Second Chance	Rose
2016	The Achy Breaky Hearts	Aida Villanueva
2016	Pedicab	Doray
2016	The Woman Who Left	Petra
2016	Vince and Kath and James	Karina / Kath's mom
2016	Saving Sally	Sally's mother
2017	Corpus Delicti	Lydia Mondejar
2017	Bliss	Jillian
2017	Love Is...	Aurora
2017	Paki	
2019	Sunshine Family	
2022	Adarna Gang	
2022	When the Waves Are Gone	
2025	The Rapists of Pepsi Paloma	Lydia Duena Whitley
2025	Only We Know	Cora

=== Television ===
Year	Title	Role	Notes
2025	FPJ's Batang Quiapo	Gracia Benito	
2024	Magpakailanman		Episode: "Always In My Mind"
2023	The Missing Husband	Sharon Sanchez vda. de Rosales	
2022	Lolong	Landlady	
2022; 2024	Jose & Maria's Bonggang Villa	Aurora "Mama Au" Cabangbang	
2022	Maalaala Mo Kaya	Norie Bordador	Episode: "Selda" and "Tablet"; Credited as "Shamaine Buencamino"
2021–2022	I Left My Heart in Sorsogon	Isadora "Adora" Estrellado	
2021	Maalaala Mo Kaya	Esther	Episode: "Medalya"
2020	Maalaala Mo Kaya	Daylyn Amaro	Episode: "Notebook"
2020	Magpakailanman	Remy	Episode: "Walang Iwanan"
2019	Ipaglaban Mo!	Medy	Episode: "Ingrata"
2019	Maalaala Mo Kaya	Old Lina	Episode: "Red Roses"
2019	Maalaala Mo Kaya	Marichu Tesoro Go	Episode: "Steak"
2018	Maalaala Mo Kaya	Linda	Episode: "Drawing"
2018	Ipaglaban Mo!	Pacing	Episode: "Puslit"
2018	Hindi Ko Kayang Iwan Ka	Magda Balagtas	
2018	Magpakailanman	Lourdes	Episode: "Victim of Bullying"
2017–2018	La Luna Sangre	Barang	
2017	Maalaala Mo Kaya	Julita	Episode: "Kwekkwek"
2017	Ipaglaban Mo	Thelma	Episode: "Mental"
2016	Ipaglaban Mo	Gino's Mother	Episode: "Bintang"
2016	Magpakailanman	Eloisa	Episode: "The Rape Video Scandal"
2016	Magpakailanman	Flor	Episode: "Kakambal kong ahas"
2016–2021	FPJ's Ang Probinsyano	Virginia "Virgie" Arevalo	
2015	My Mother's Secret	Esther Guevarra	
2015	Maalaala Mo Kaya	Perya	Episode: "Korona"
2015	Ipaglaban Mo	Dolores	Episode: "Pagkakasala ng Ama"
2015	Kailan Ba Tama Ang Mali?	Aurora Torralba	
2014	Maalaala Mo Kaya	Mama	Episode: "Nurse's Cap"
2014	Ipaglaban Mo	Miling	Episode: "Hindi ko sinasadya, Yaya"
2014	Seasons of Love	Victoria Madrigal	4 episodes Chapter: "I Do, I Don't"
2014	Dading	Mila Marasigan	Supporting Cast
2014	Maalaala Mo Kaya	Tetchie	Episode: "Birth Certificate"
2014	Magpakailanman	Mia	Episode: "Girl boy balka tomboy"
2013–2014	Magkano Ba ang Pag-ibig?	Loida Canlas-Aguirre	
2013	Magpakailanman	Beng	Episode: "Siga Noon, Beki Ngayon"
2013	Genesis	Sister Soledad Abanez	
2013	Magpakailanman	Nanay	Episode: "School Bullying Caught on Cam"
2013	Magpakailanman	Nanay	Episode: "Gang Rape"
2013	May Isang Pangarap	Azon Francisco	
2012	Walang Hanggan	Luisa Alcantara / Reyes	
2012	Legacy	Lydia Dimacuycoy	
2011–2012	Kung Aagawin Mo ang Langit	Marissa Martinez	
2011	Mars Ravelo's Captain Barbell	Evie	
2010–2011	Little Star	Cecilia "Cecille" Cordova	
2010	Pilyang Kerubin	Ason Garcia	
2009	SRO Cinemaserye: Rowena Joy	RJ/Rowena Joy's mother	
2008	Kahit Isang Saglit	Mrs. Barbara Reyes	
2007–2008	Prinsesa ng Banyera	Rosa Perrei	
2007	Sineserye Presents: Hiram na Mukha	Timotea De Leon	
2007	Muli		
2006	Majika	Losaya	
2003	Hawak Ko ang Langit		
2001	Sa Dulo ng Walang Hanggan	Doña Veronica	
1999	Saan Ka Man Naroroon	Aurora Madrigal	
1997	Esperanza	Sonya	
1995	Star Drama Theater Presents: Aiko	Ina's mother	Episode: "Kulay Putik ang Daan sa Langit"
