= Como Ser Feliz Ganhando Pouco =

Como ser Feliz ganhando Pouco

Studio album by O Bando do Velho Jack
- Released: 2002
- Genres: Blues, Rock

O Bando do Velho Jack chronology
Procurado (2000)	Como ser Feliz ganhando Pouco (2002)	Ao Vivo e Acústico no Som do Mato (2004)

Como ser Feliz ganhando Pouco is the third album from Brazilian blues/rock band O Bando do Velho Jack, and was released in 2002.

== Track listing ==
1. Como ser feliz ganhando pouco
2. Eu não preciso ir ao puteiro
3. Cavaleiro da pica
4. Eu só sei que o seu amor nunca foi muito bom pra mim
5. All Right Now
6. Não fique triste
7. Velhos e velhas
8. Nuvens
9. Longe de você
10. Agora falta um
11. I'm your captain (Closer to home) - Intro
12. I'm Your Captain (Closer to Home)
13. Nina
14. Casa do rock - bonus track
