= Ang Lihim ni Antonio =

- Theatrical release poster
- Directed by: Joselito Altarejos
- Written by: Lex Bonife
- Produced by: Joselito Altarejos Vicente del Rosario III, Valeria del Rosario, Hermie Go
- Starring: Kenji Garcia; Jiro Manio; Kenjie Santos; Shamaine Centenera-Buencamino; Josh Ivan Morales; Nino Fernandez
- Cinematography: Arvin Viola
- Music by: Ajit Hardasani
- Distributed by: Viva Films (through Digital Viva Productions)
- Release date: February 4, 2008
- Running time: 100 minutes
- Country: Philippines
- Language: Tagalog

Ang Lihim ni Antonio (English: Antonio's Secret) is a 2008 Filipino film by Filipino film director Joselito Altarejos. It tells the story about teenage boy whose emerging gay sexuality alienates him from his friends and family, until his libertine uncle, Jonbert (Josh Ivan Morales), comes to live with him and his mother. Antonio thinks he has found a kindred spirit, until the older man's intentions toward the boy become incestuous and an act of unthinkable violence leaves the family reeling.

== Plot ==
Antonio (Kenji Garcia) is a sexually curious fifteen-year-old boy who is beginning to discover his own sexuality. Although his straight best friend, Mike (Jiro Manio), has been supportive of his coming out, his first sexual encounter with another man has led to the destruction of his friendship with his other best friend, Nathan with whom he had engaged in sexual intercourse on one drunken Christmas night.

Antonio's exploration of his identity unfolds as his family begins to break apart. His altruistic mother, Tere (Shamaine Centenera-Buencamino) is in complete denial that his father has already abandoned them.

One day, Antonio's grandparents arrived at their home bringing in with them, his uncle Jonbert (Josh Ivan Morales). Jonbert plans to stay at Antonio's house while he is processing the necessary papers for his new work. During lunch, Antonio is seen looking at his uncle with sexual malice, and his Uncle Jonbert seems to respond, also looking with confusion.

Antonio shares his room with his uncle Jonbert, with the latter often parading and sleeping in his underwear which increases the former's sexual attraction. As days go by, Antonio starts to sexually daydream and using his uncle's belonging whenever he masturbates, he also peeked in a hole while his uncle is taking a bath, intensifying his sexual desires over his uncle. One rainy night, Antonio begins to fondle his uncle while the latter is seemingly sleeping ending up masturbating him. Scared of what he's done, he became awkward and cold around Jonbert, which the latter seems to notice. Jonbert softly confronts Antonio and tells him that he was aware of what Antonio did ultimately confessing that he enjoyed it. He further seduces a surprised Antonio, and leading the latter to perform fellatio on him. From then on, they continue to regularly masturbate each other and have oral sex for days, and sometimes sharing sweet gestures when they are alone.

One morning, the two were left in the house alone. While taking breakfast, Antonio seduced his uncle by groping him, and decided to give him a fellatio. Jonbert growing increasingly bored of their usual routine, suggested to anally penetrate Antonio, to which the boy refused. Unable to take no for an answer, Jonbert forces his way to Antonio while the latter objects and cries in pain.

His mother arrives, witnessed the situation and kills Jonbert.

== Cast ==
Actor	Role
Kenjie Garcia	Antonio
Jiro Manio	Mike
Shamaine Centenera-Buencamino	Tere
Josh Ivan Morales	Uncle Jonbert
Ricky Ibe	Eli
Joey Deleon	Tonet

== Soundtrack ==
Music of the film is performed by Ajit Hardasani entitled "Awit Para Kay Antonio" (Song for Antonio). Lyrics by Lex Bonife and music by Ajit Hardasani.

== Location ==
It was shot entirely in Marikina.
