= Allison Gilbert =

American author and journalist

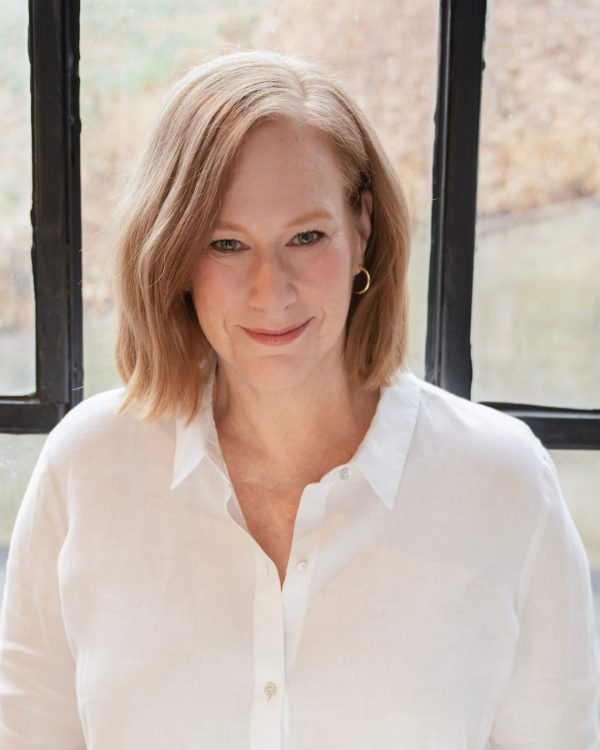
- Occupations: Journalist, author
- Known for: The Joy of Connections: 100 Ways to Beat Loneliness and Live a Happier and More Meaningful Life
- Website: www.allisongilbert.com

Allison Gilbert is an American journalist, bestselling author, and speaker whose work focuses on human connection, social health, and grief. She has written or co-written six books including The Joy of Connections with Dr. Ruth K. Westheimer. The book grew out of Gilbert's article for The New York Times, “Dr. Ruth Saved People's Sex Lives. Now She Wants to Cure Loneliness,” which covered Westheimer's appointment as New York State's Ambassador to Loneliness.

== Career ==
=== Social health and connection ===
Gilbert hosts 92NY's Connected Lives series and her most recent book, The Joy of Connections, was named one of the 10 best well-being books for 2024 by Audible and named one of The Best Books and Podcasts in 2024 About Aging and Retirement by The Wall Street Journal.

Gilbert has written for or been featured in many publications including The New York Times, The Wall Street Journal, and USA Today. Gilbert has been interviewed on Good Morning America, NPR, TED Radio Hour, and more.

=== Grief and September 11 attacks ===
Gilbert was a journalist covering the September 11 attacks and went on to co-edit Covering Catastrophe: Broadcast Journalists Report September 11, a historical record of how broadcast journalists covered the attacks. Gilbert is the official narrator of the National September 11 Memorial & Museum’s historical exhibition audio tour and her voice is introduced by Robert De Niro on the museum's “Witnessing History” tour. She is the co-executive producer of the documentary Reporting 9/11 and Why It Still Matters and host of the companion 20-part documentary series Women Journalists of 9/11: Their Stories, produced in collaboration with the National September 11 Memorial & Museum and Wondrium for the 20th anniversary of 9/11. These projects include interviews with journalists such as Savannah Guthrie, Maggie Haberman, Scott Pelley, Byron Pitts, Dana Bash, and Linda Wertheimer.

Gilbert has written or reported on grief for The Washington Post, The Atlantic, The TODAY Show, CNN, and more.

=== TV news ===
Allison Gilbert started her career in TV news. At CNN, Gilbert produced TV segments and wrote stories for CNN.com. Before CNN, she was a special projects producer at WABC-TV and an investigative producer at WNBC-TV.

== Awards and honors ==
- Received three New York Emmy awards, five New York Emmy nominations for various hard news reporting.
- The Joy of Connections named a USA Today bestseller
- The Joy of Connections named one of the best books on aging by The Wall Street Journal
- The Joy of Connections named a top-10 well-being book of the year by Audible
- Washington Irving Book Award for Parentless Parents
- Northern California Book Award, General Nonfiction Award for Listen, World!
- New York Press Club, Commentary Online Winner for CNN.com article, “A Woman Who Composed the First Draft of History Finds Herself Written Out of the History Books

== Publications ==
=== Books ===
- The Joy of Connections: 100 Ways to Beat Loneliness and Live a Happier and More Meaningful Life with co-authors Dr. Ruth K. Westheimer and Pierre Lehu (Rodale: 2023)
- Listen, World!: How the Intrepid Elsie Robinson Became America's Most-Read Woman with co-author Julia Scheeres (Seal Press: September 2022)
- Passed and Present: Keeping Memories of Loved Ones Alive (Seal Press: 2016)
- Parentless Parents: How the Loss of Our Mothers and Fathers Impacts the Way We Raise Our Children (Hyperion: 2011)
- Always Too Soon: Voices of Support for Those Who Have Lost Both Parents, edited by Christina Baker Kline (Seal Press: 2006)
- Covering Catastrophe: Broadcast Journalists Report September 11, co-edited with Phil Hirshkorn, Melinda Murphy, Mitchell Stephens, and Robyn Walensky; (Bonus Books: 2002)

=== Select essays and reporting ===
- Meet the Zoomers preaching 'Appstinence' to their peers (January 2026) Times of London
- The secret to great sex isn't really a secret. It's asking the right question, 81-year-old sex professor says (February 2025) CNN
- Long After ‘Sexually Speaking,’ Dr. Ruth Taught Me About Friendship (July 2024) The New York Times
- Opinion: Dr. Ruth taught us not only about sex but also chosen family (July 2024) CNN
- Dr. Ruth Saved People's Sex Lives. Now She Wants to Cure Loneliness. (November 2023) The New York Times
- Opinion: A woman who composed the first draft of history finds herself written out of the history books (August 2023) CNN
- The Grief Crisis Is Coming (April 2021) The New York Times
- Why Looking at a Photo Can Ease Loneliness and Grief (November 2016) O, The Oprah Magazine
- Journalist and Survivor: The Rules Blurred on 9/11 (May 2014) CNN.com

== Education ==
- Ethical Culture Fieldston School
- Georgetown University
