= Legacy (Philippine TV series) =

2012 Philippine television drama series

- Title card
- Genre: Drama
- Created by: Dode Cruz
- Developed by: Denoy Navarro-Punio
- Written by: Des Garbes-Severino; Marlon Miguel; Onay Sales
- Directed by: Jay Altarejos; Andoy Ranay
- Creative directors: Jun Lana; Jake Tordesillas; Suzette Doctolero
- Starring: Heart Evangelista; Lovi Poe
- Opening theme: "Legacy theme"
- Ending theme: "I Know He's There Waiting for Me" by Jonalyn Viray, Aicelle Santos and Maricris Garcia
- Country of origin: Philippines
- Original language: Tagalog
- No. of episodes: 98

Production
- Executive producer: Winnie Hollis-Reyes
- Production locations: Manila, Philippines; Pampanga, Philippines
- Cinematography: Carlos S. Montaño Jr.
- Camera setup: Multiple-camera setup
- Running time: 21–34 minutes
- Production company: GMA Entertainment TV

Original release
- Network: GMA Network
- Release: January 16 – June 1, 2012

Legacy is a 2012 Philippine television drama series broadcast by GMA Network. Directed by Jay Altarejos and Andoy Ranay, it stars Heart Evangelista and Lovi Poe. It premiered on January 16, 2012 on the network's Telebabad line up. The series concluded on June 1, 2012, with a total of 98 episodes.

The series is streaming online on YouTube.

== Cast and characters ==
Cast

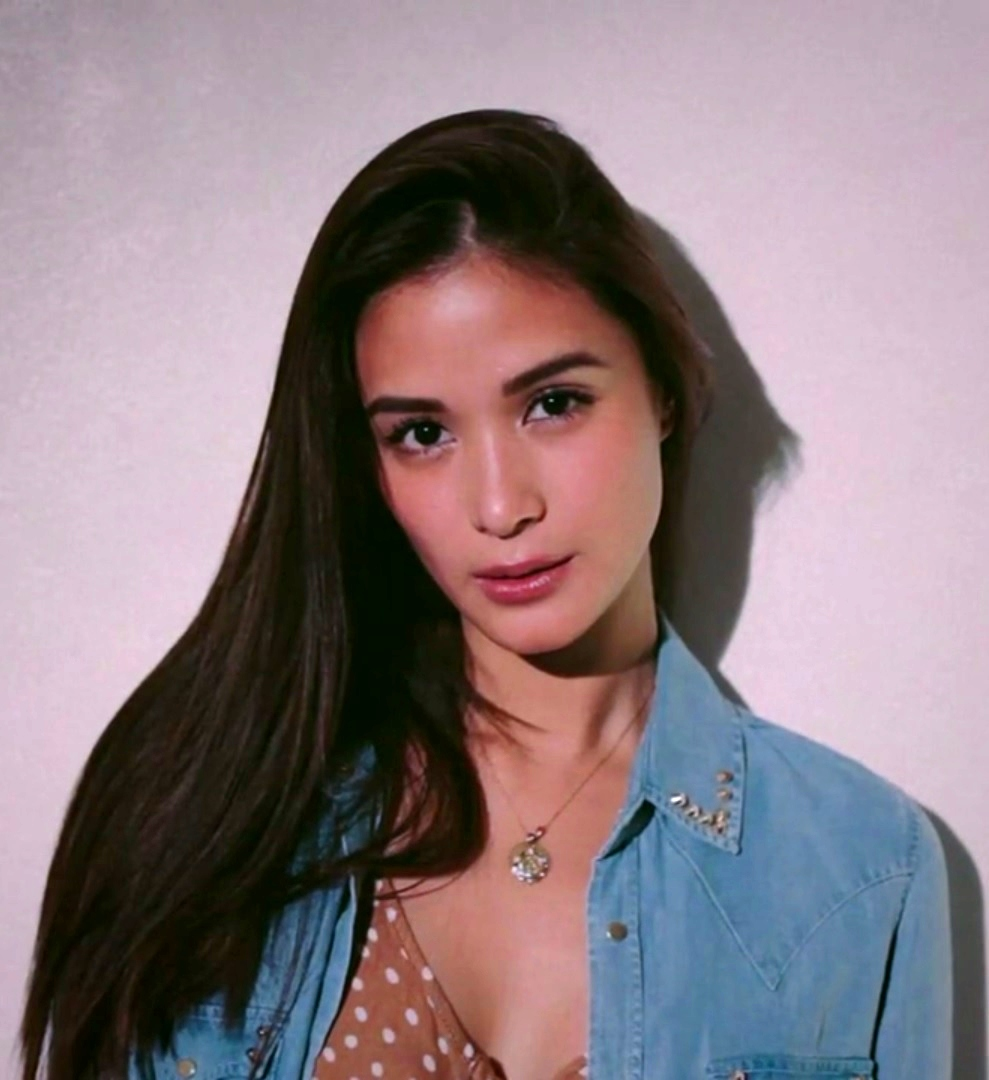
Heart Evangelista

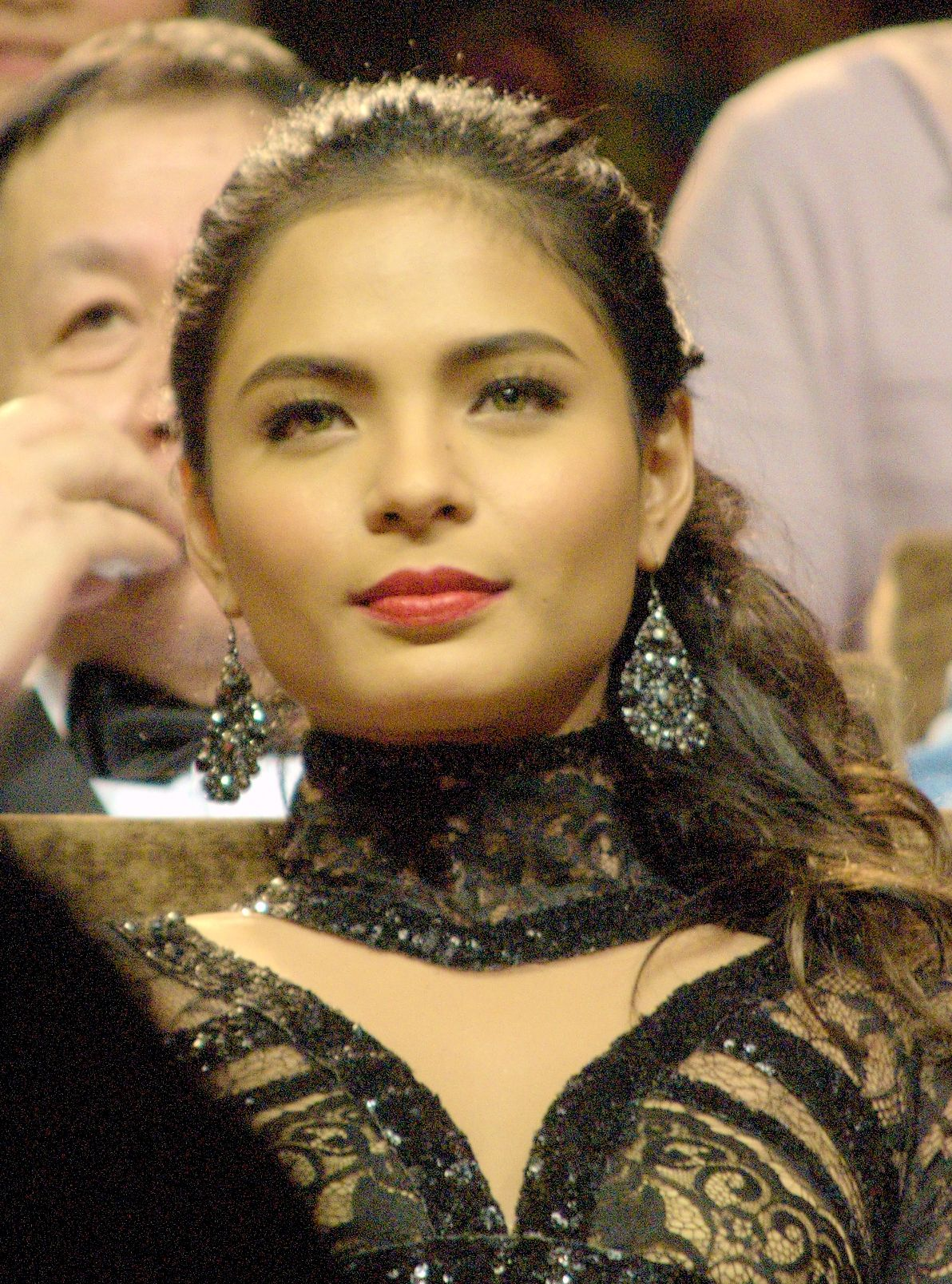
Lovi Poe

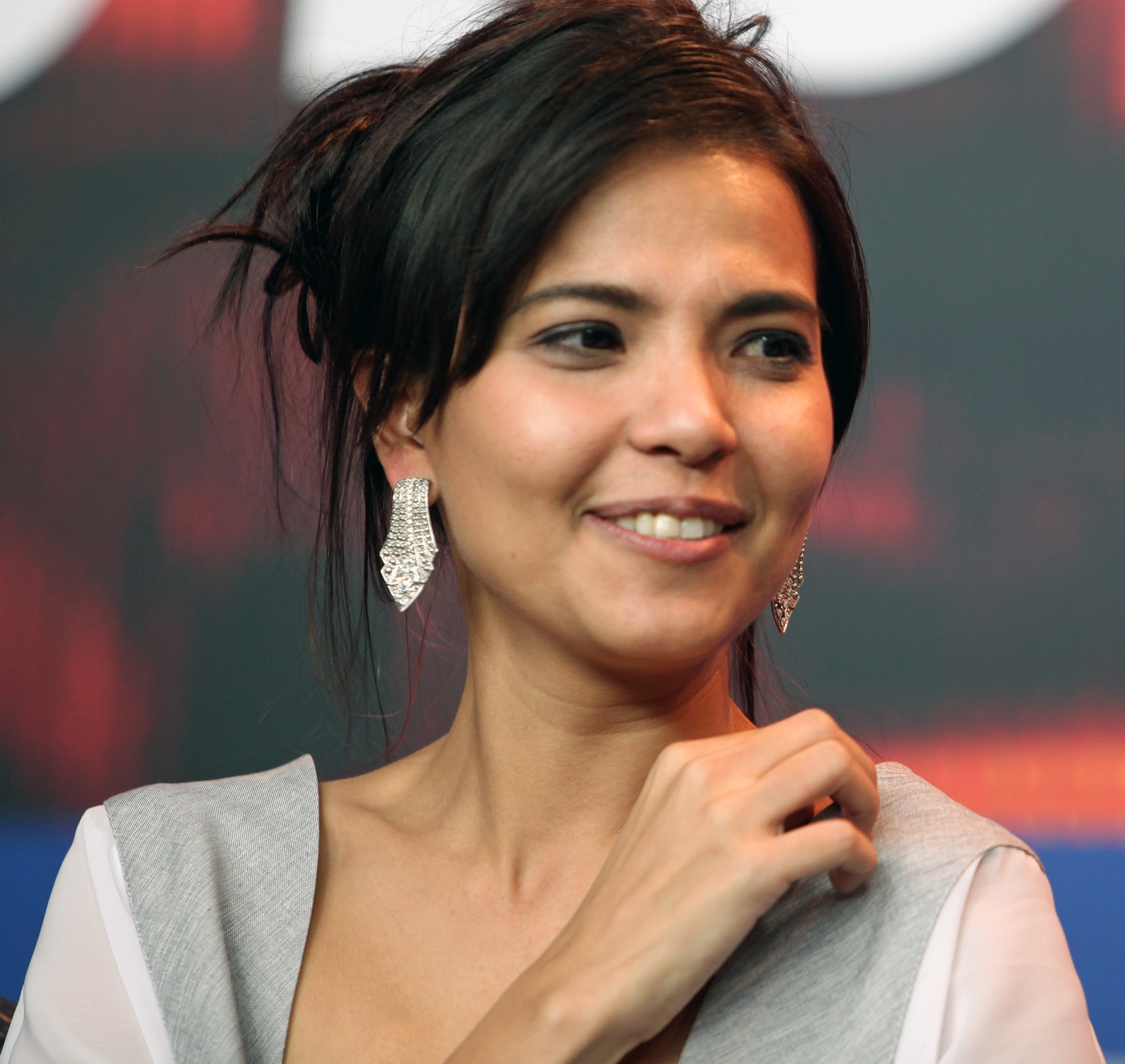
Alessandra De Rossi

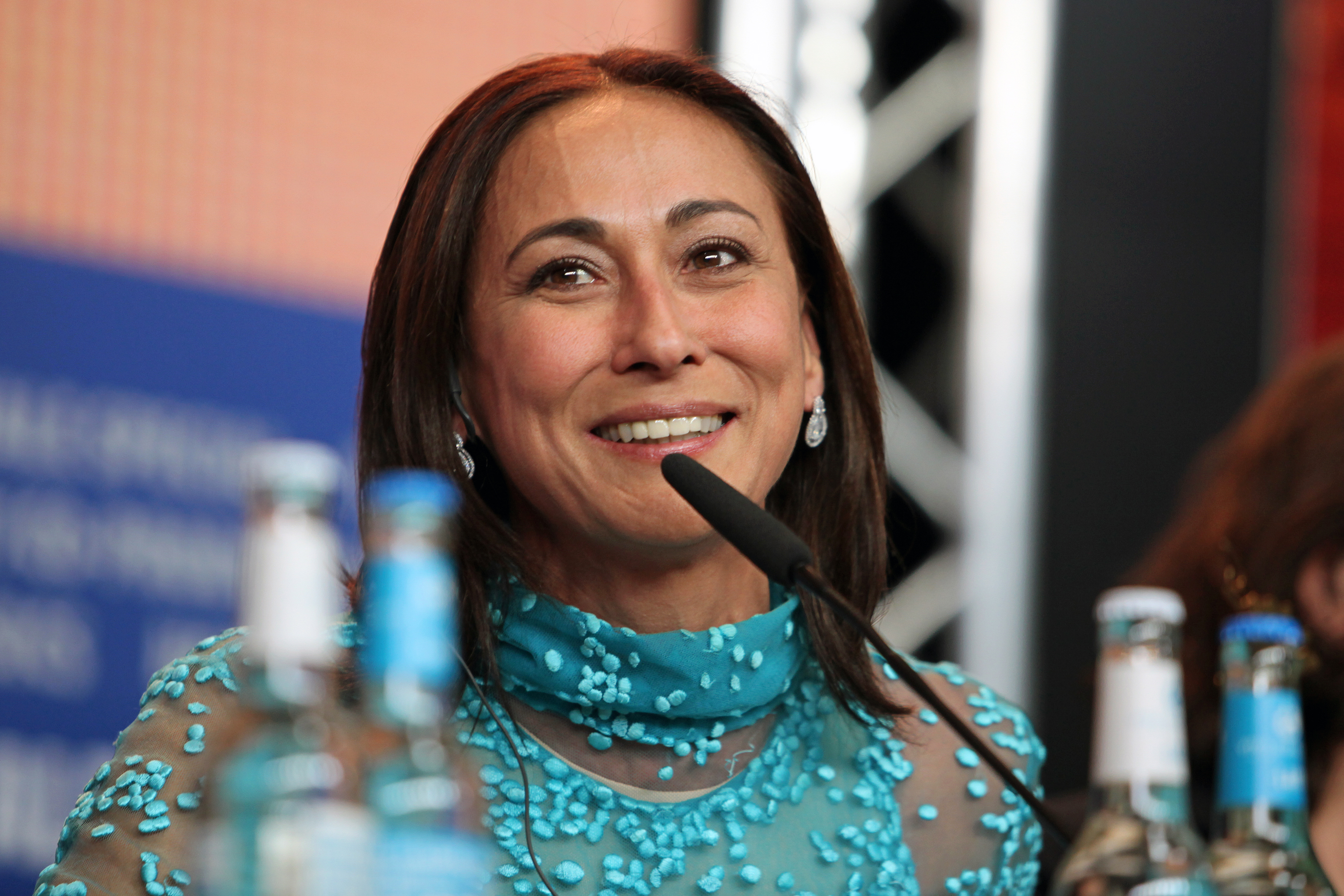
Cherie Gil

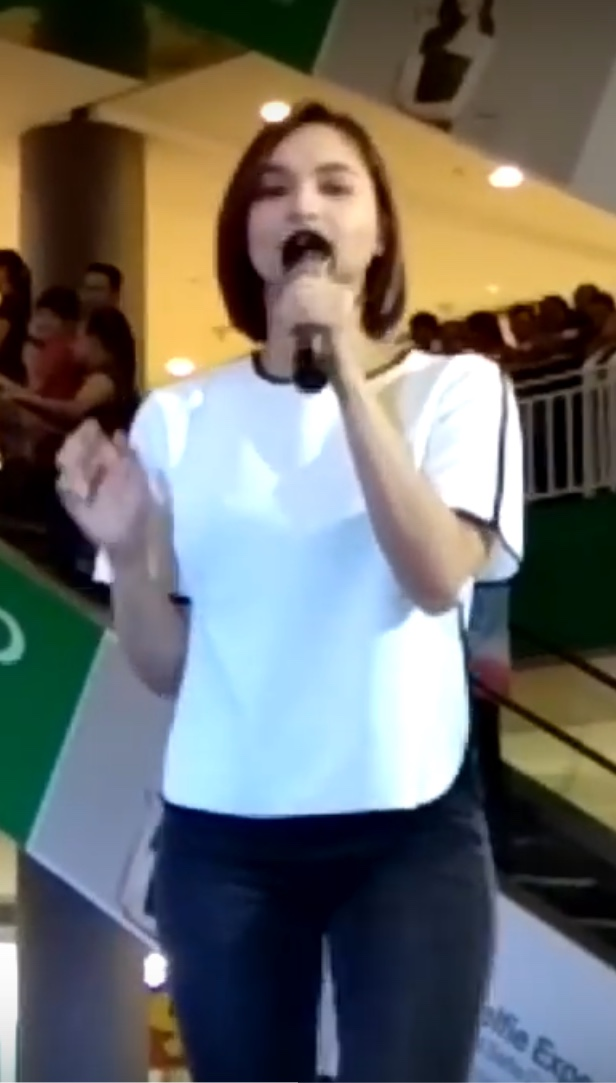
Ryza Cenon

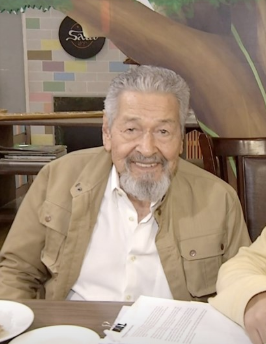
Eddie Garcia

Lead cast

- Heart Evangelista as Diana Calcetas
- Lovi Poe as Natasha Alcantara

Supporting cast

- Geoff Eigenmann as Joshua "Josh" Castillo
- Sid Lucero as Iñigo Salcedo
- Alessandra De Rossi as Bernadette Leviste
- Mike Tan as Arturo "Third" San Jose III
- Eddie Garcia as Romualdo Alcantara
- Liza Lorena as Sofia Altamirano
- Jackie Lou Blanco as Isabel Calcetas-Aragon
- Maritoni Fernandez as Anna Marie Leviste
- Cherie Gil as Eva Altamirano-Alcantara
- Mark Bautista as Eboy
- Solenn Heussaff as Chloe Martin
- Sam Pinto as Ciara Estuar
- Ryza Cenon as Juliet
- Chariz Solomon as Candy
- Richard Quan as Lucio Aragon
- Johnny Revilla
- Lloyd Samartino as Rowell
- Bon Vibar as Arturo San Jose Sr.
- Tim Yap as Justin

Guest cast

- Dennis Trillo as younger Cesar Alcantara
- Carla Abellana as herself
- Bianca King as younger Isabel Calcetas-Aragon
- Chynna Ortaleza as younger Eva Altamirano-Alcantara
- Dominic Roco as younger Lucio Aragon
- Robert Seña as older Cesar Alcantara
- Isabel Nesreen Frial as younger Diana Calcetas
- Benedict Campos as younger Rowell
- Sue Prado as younger Sofia Altamirano
- Maria Isabel Lopez as Lala Salcedo
- Arthur Solinap as Quintin
- Bodie Cruz as Franco
- Bubbles Paraiso as Marie
- Carlo Gonzales as Gary
- Daisy Reyes as Maridess
- Gian Magdangal as himself
- Jonalyn Viray as herself
- Aicelle Santos as herself
- Maricris Garcia as herself
- Shamaine Centenera-Buencamino as Lydia
- Rhen Escano as Bekbek
- Tom Olivar as Rogelio
- Victor Aliwalas as Von

== Production ==
Principal photography commenced on November 26, 2011.

== Reception ==
=== Ratings ===
According to AGB Nielsen Philippines' Mega Manila household television ratings, the pilot episode of Legacy earned a 23.4% rating. The final episode scored a 28.4% rating.

=== Critical response ===
Legacy gathered positive feedback from critics for its visual style and acting. Eddison Miranda of Rogue Magazine Philippines, wrote: "I love how the villains play an effective role but having to blend with a comedic outcome." He highlighted Fernandez and Gil's performances.

== Accolades ==
Accolades received by Legacy
Year	Award	Category	Recipient	Result	Ref.
2012	Parangal ng Media	Best Soap Opera	Legacy	Won	
2013	10th Golden Screen TV Awards	Outstanding Original Drama Series	Legacy	Nominated	
2013	10th Golden Screen TV Awards	Outstanding Performance by an Actress in a Drama Series	Alessandra De Rossi Lovi Poe	Nominated	
