= Patong Girl =

- Directed by: Susanna Salonen
- Screenplay by: Susanna Salonen
- Starring: Max Mauff, Aisawanya Areyawattana
- Cinematography: Yoliswa von Dallwitz
- Edited by: Bettina Böhler
- Release date: 25 December 2014
- Running time: 89 minutes
- Countries: Germany, Thailand
- Languages: German, English, Thai

Patong Girl is a 2014 German-Thai film written and directed by Susanna Salonen. The film premiered on the Festival of German film in Ludwigshafen. It was theatrically released in Germany on 25 December 2014 and in Thailand 21 April 2016. The film premiered in the U.S. at the Austin Film Festival 2014.

== Plot ==
The German Schroeder family spends their Christmas holidays on the Thai island of Phuket, and in one of the sleazy bars of Patong Beach, 18-year-old son Felix falls in love with a young, gorgeous Thai woman. Felix's brother Tommy is sure that Fai is a prostitute, his parents are uneasy about Felix's love for her, too. After a tearful goodbye at the end of the holidays, Felix spontaneously decides to follow his heart - and to stay in Thailand. Alarmed, his mother Annegret forfeits her return ticket - she will not leave Felix by himself in this foreign country with a "prostitute". Felix joins Fai on the bus to her home town in Isaan. During the bus-ride he learns that Fai is not exactly the woman he thought she was - fearing rejection, Fai had not revealed her transgender identity. Meanwhile, Annegret is looking for her son.

== Cast ==
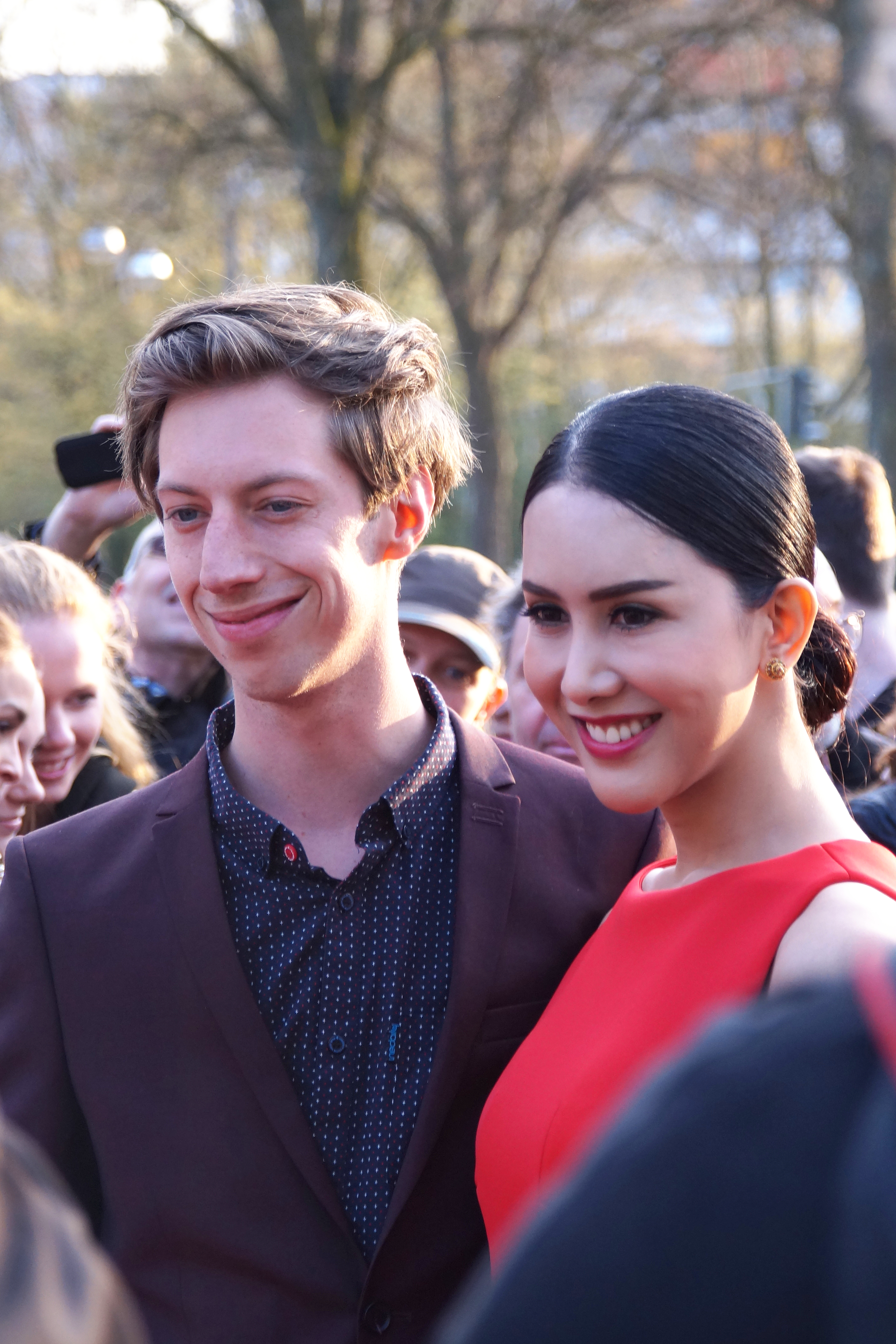
Max Mauff and Aisawanya Areyawattana at the Grimme-Award 2016

- Max Mauff as Felix
- Aisawanya Areyawattana as Fai
- Victoria Trauttmansdorff as Annegret
- Uwe Preuss as Ulrich
- Marcel Glauche as Tommy

== Reception ==
In 2016, Patong Girl was awarded the German Grimme-Award for screenplay, directing, production and main cast.
