= The Butchers (film) =

- DVD released by Uncork'd Entertainment
- Directed by: Steven Judd
- Written by: David McClellan; Stephen Durham
- Produced by: David Dittlinger; Stephen Durham
- Starring: Gary Kasper; Jacob Hobbs; Christy Keller; Milly Sanders; Semi Anthony; Braxton Davis; Damien Puckler; Cameron Bowen
- Cinematography: Clint Childers
- Edited by: David McClellan
- Production companies: 2nd Nature Films; WeerNProduction; StoryTyme Productions; Potty Mouth Production
- Distributed by: 4Digital Media
- Release date: July 7, 2014 (United Kingdom)
- Running time: 80 minutes
- Country: United States
- Language: English

The Butchers (also known as Death Factory and The Factory) is a 2014 horror film directed by Steven Judd and written by David Dittlinger and Stephen Durham.

== Plot ==
While on a bus with his brother, Brian, and a dozen others, Simon has a nightmare about when he fatally clubbed his abusive father, who had killed their mother. In a nearby ghost town, the landowner meets JB, a lawyer who wants to buy the property, primarily for its museum dedicated to serial killers: Albert Fish, John Wayne Gacy, Jack the Ripper, Jeffrey Dahmer, Ed Gein, and the Zodiac, "The Death Factory". When the landowner refuses to sell the museum along with the rest of his property, JB stabs him, then prepares an occult ritual with a Book of the Dead, and blood samples taken from the displays in the Death Factory.

Elsewhere, the bus Simon is on breaks down, so he and the other passengers go in search of aid while the driver remains with the vehicle, which he disappears with after the group leaves. The passengers reach the ghost town, and while the others debate what to do, Star and Ren wander off, and uncover JB's belongings. For fun, the duo read from the Book of the Dead, unintentionally resurrecting Fish, Gacy, Dahmer, Gein, the Zodiac, and the Ripper, who is revealed to be lesbian.

While JB fights to flee from Fish, Star is killed by Gein, and Ren is slain by the Zodiac. Simon is then attacked by Fish, whose neck he breaks, causing Fish to disintegrate into a dust that enters Simon's body. The other murderers, who begin succumbing to infighting, continue to run amok. Gacy stabs Bill, the Ripper dismembers Nicole, JB guts Candi, and Gein stabs Dahmer, and then is bludgeoned by JB.

Simon stabs Gacy and the Ripper, and absorbs their "power" like he did Fish's, Gein did Dahmer's, and JB did Gein's. Simon, Brian, and the remaining passengers, are then confronted by JB, who impales Simon, though his friends resurrect him with the Book of the Dead, giving Simon the chance to snap JB's neck. Simon is then overpowered by the Zodiac, who the others set on fire, and hit with the landowner's car, which they and Simon drive off in.

The bus driver, who is implied to be Satan, reappears, and revives JB, noting, "You think you can steal from me, and there won't be Hell to pay? Or should I say, repay? C'mon, son, you've got work to do."

== Cast ==
- Semi Anthony as JB
- Damien Puckler as Simon
- Randall Bosley as The Collector
- Cameron Bowen as Brian
- Braxton Davis as Bill
- Mara Hall as Auntie May
- Jacob Hobbs as Kip
- Tonya Kay as Star
- Christy Keller as Jan
- Charito Mertz as Candi
- Milly Sanders as Daisy
- Jeremy Thorsen as Ren
- Ire Wardlaw as Nicole
- Rick Williamson as Albert Fish
- Hawk Walts as John Wayne Gacy
- Mary LeGault as Ripper
- Marion Kopf as Jeffrey Dahmer
- Gary Kasper as Ed Gein
- John C. Epperson as The Zodiac

== Reception ==
Of the film, Rob Getz of Horror News wrote "No one will accuse Death Factory of greatness, but it would lose its charm if it were" and that it relies "far more on curiosity factor than upon consistency or execution". UK Horror Scene's Dave Wain gave the film a 0/10, and condemned it as "an abhorrent sleazy little movie that will only serve to repel and disgust anyone that's unfortunate to come across it".
