= Amigo de Aluguel =

Brazilian comedy television series

- Genre: Comedy
- Starring: Felipe Abib; Luciana Paes; Thiago Amaral; Christiana Ubach; Julia Ianina; Enzo Barone; César Mello; Gabriela Yoon
- Country of origin: Brazil
- Original language: Portuguese
- No. of seasons: 1
- No. of episodes: 5

Production
- Production companies: O2 Filmes; Universal TV

Original release
- Network: Universal TV (Brazil)
- Release: August 26, 2018

Amigo de Aluguel is a Brazilian comedy television series that premiered on Universal TV in Brazil on August 26, 2018.

The series is starred by Felipe Abib, and follows the story of Fred, a failed actor who happens to be a "Friend For Hire", which turns into the person you need, at the time you need it most.

== Premise ==
With his professional life collapsing an unemployed actor (Fred) decides to become a "Friend For Hire" and make company for those who feel alone. However, in order to survive at this new environment he needs to be prepared to deal with the craziest situations.

== Cast ==
- Felipe Abib as Frederico (Fred) / João Paulo / Cauê Sol
- Luciana Paes as Sara
- Thiago Amaral as Jun Ho
- Christiana Ubach as Angelina
- Julia Ianina as Carla
- Enzo Barone as Ivan
- César Mello as Victor
- Gabriela Yoon as Min Ha
