= The Commitment (film) =

- The Commitment
- Directed by: Joselito Altarejos
- Written by: Joselito Altarejos; Zig Madamba Dulay
- Produced by: Joselito Altarejos; Ferdinand Lapuz; Maureen Mauricio
- Starring: Arnold Reyes; Oliver Aquino
- Cinematography: Mycko David
- Edited by: Joselito Altarejos; Zig Madamba Dulay
- Music by: Richard Gonzales
- Release date: August 2014 (Cinemalaya)
- Country: Philippines
- Languages: Filipino; English

The Commitment (Filipino: Kasal; transl. Marriage) is a 2014 Filipino film co-produced, co-written, co-edited, and directed by Joselito Altarejos. It was premiered as an entry to the Directors Showcase during the 10th Cinemalaya Philippine Independent Film Festival held in 2014. The film went on to win the Best Film title in the festival.

== Synopsis ==
A Filipino gay couple are resolve to stay with each other. But things get complicated as they are invited to attend a wedding. It shows how a gay couple have to navigate difficult social norms. The film also questions the openness of Filipino society and its institutions.

== Cast ==
- Arnold Reyes
- Oliver Aquino
- Rita Avila
- Maureen Mauricio
- Rener Concepcion
- Ruby Ruiz
- Ronwaldo Martin
- Chloe Carpio

== Awards and nominations ==
The film was featured in the 2014 Cinemalaya Independent Film Festival where it won the Balanghai Trophy in four categories:

- Best Film - Directors Showcase to director Joselito Altarejos for "its deeply sensitive and moving depiction of the intricacies of relationships".
- Best Original Music Score to Richard Gonzales
- Best Production Design to Harley Alcasid
- Best Cinematography to Mycko David

During the Gawad Urian Awards in 2015, the lead actor Arnold Reyes was nominated for the "Best Actor" (Pinakamahusay na Pangunahing Aktor) category for his role in the film.
