= Bicho do Mato =

Studio album by O Bando do Velho Jack
- Released: 2007
- Genre: Blues, Rock

O Bando do Velho Jack chronology
Ao Vivo e Acústico no Som do Mato (2004)	Bicho do Mato (2007)

Bicho do Mato is the fifth album from Brazilian blues/rock band O Bando do Velho Jack, and was released in 2007.

== Track listing ==
No.	Title	Length
1.	"Bicho do Mato"	4:51
2.	"Gasolina"	3:27
3.	"Dois Caminhos"	3:45
4.	"Máquina do Tempo"	5:55
5.	"Quando Eu For Embora"	4:32
6.	"Pedras Que Rolam"	4:05
7.	"Lixo Humano"	4:47
8.	"Mais Perto de Mim"	5:03
9.	"5'45""	5:44
10.	"Martinika"	1:04
11.	"Tô Indo Te Buscar"	3:29
12.	"O Fim do Mato Magnetizado"	1:26
13.	"Mito Solar da Morte"	5:36
14.	"Rock das Cadelas"	4:17
