= Tonya Kay =

American actress and burlesque performer

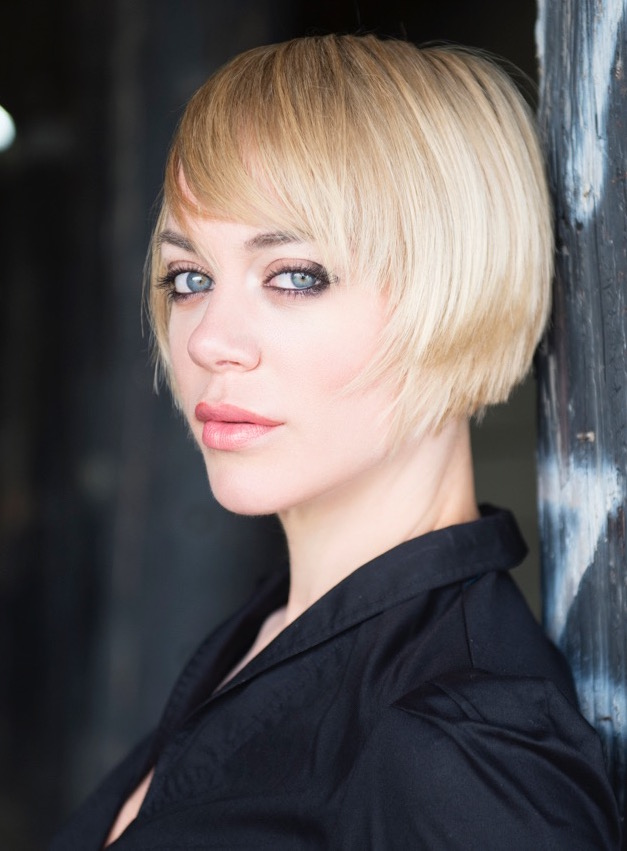
- Born: October 8, 1981 (age 44); Michigan, U.S.
- Occupation(s): Actress, burlesque performer
- Years active: 2004–present
- Movement: Raw veganism Neo-burlesque
- Website: tonyakay.com

Tonya Kay (born October 8, 1981) is an American film actress, television personality, and burlesque performer who is the creator and producer of Tonya Kay's Pinup Pole Show.

== Early life ==
Tonya Kay was born in southern Michigan. She graduated as valedictorian of her high school class. Kay is a practicing raw vegan, pagan and Chaote.

== Career ==
=== Early career ===
Kay began tap dance training at age four. At age six, she performed in a local community theatre production of the musical Oliver!. At 15, she was cast in her first professional production, The Music Man at Detroit, Michigan's Fisher Theatre. She spent four years performing in Chicago theatres, including the Drury Lane Theatre, Peninsula Players, Theatre at the Centre, Theatre Building Chicago and Apollo Theater Chicago. In New York City, she performed concert dance and experimental theatre, including De La Guarda, and eventually toured in Stomp.

=== Television and film ===
Her guest appearances on American network television programs include Jane the Virgin, Criminal Minds, House M.D., Glee, The Fosters, and Rosewood. Her movie credits include Bastard (20th Century Fox), The Other Wife, Web Cam Girls & Saving My Baby (LMN), and an upcoming release on SyFy, Earthtastrophe.

=== Business ventures ===
Tonya Kay is a devoted environmentalist and has held the CEO position of two carbon-neutral film and television industry service companies: Solid Hollywood LLC and Happy Mandible, Inc.

== Filmography ==
=== Film ===
Year	Title	Role	Notes
2003	Closer to Death	Jennifer	
2007	L.A. Proper	Cocktail Waitress	
2008	Orgies and the Meaning of Life	Regine	
2008	3 Days Gone	Sloan	
2009	The Things We Carry	Samara	
2010	Get Him to the Greek	Model	Uncredited
2010	Bold Native	I Rock	
2011	The Muppets	Dancer / Electrician	Uncredited
2011	The Mudman	Feather Black	
2011	Fully Loaded	Bikini girl	
2012	Creep Van	Fighting Woman at Gas Station	
2013	Raze	Alex	
2013	The Lone Ranger	Specialty - Fire Fingers	Uncredited
2013	Dark Space	Flowers	
2013	Midday Games	Claire 2	
2014	The Butchers	Star	
2014	Nightmare Code	Radova	
2015	Larry Gaye: Renegade Male Flight Attendant	Helsinki: Musical	
2015	Bastard	Rachael	
2016	Fight to the Finish	UFC Kay	
2016	The Amityville Terror	Delilah	
2016	A Better Place	Sheila Cummings	
2016	Within the Darkness	Jesse	
2016	Paradise Club	Tabitha	
2017	Evil Bong 666	Versnatchy	
2017	Puppet Master: Axis Termination	Doktor Gerde Ernst	
2018	Evil Bong 777	Versnatchy	
2018	Saving My Baby	Jessica	
2018	D-Railed	Gigi	
2019	Girl on the Third Floor	The Nymph	
2019	Verotika	Platinum Model	
2021	The Journey of Lucy	Lucy	
2022	Reed's Point	Radio announcer	

=== Television ===
Year	Title	Role	Notes
2007	Numbers	Nitrogurl	Episode: "Velocity"
2009	Live Nude Comedy	Burlesque Dancer	Episode #1.1
2009	Secret Girlfriend	Cassidy	4 episodes
2009	Criminal Minds	Tara Ferris	Episode: "The Performer"
2010	House	Chloe	Episode: "Private Lives"
2010	The Wish List	Tanya	Television film
2010	Uncle Nigel	Hot Biker Chick	Television film
2010, 2011	Glee	Various roles	2 episodes
2011	Video Game Reunion	Peach	11 episodes
2011	Friends with Benefits	Burlesque Dancer	Episode: "The Benefit of Forgetting"
2012	Silverwood: Final Recordings	Christina Rossi	4 episodes
2013–2014	Horror Haiku	The Artist	5 episodes
2014	The Kill Corporation	Dev	6 episodes
2016	The Other Wife	Deb Stanton	Television film
2016	Rosewood	Dancer in Montage	Episode: "Keratin & Kissyface"
2016	Jane the Virgin	D.J.	Episode: "Chapter Forty-Four"
2016	The Fosters	Police Officer #1	Episode: "Forty"
2016	Earthtastrophe	Nadia	Television film
2017	My Crazy Sex	Erin	Episode: "Scanned, Scammed & Slammed"
2017	The Wrong Neighbor	Jennifer	Television film
2017	Web Cam Girls	Nikki Knight	Television film
2018	Unphiltered	Day Shift	Episode: "Moneymaker"
2018	A Daughter's Revenge	Sugar Delarosa	Television film
2020	The Pom Pom Murders	Coach Cassie	Television film
2021	Animal Kingdom	Sara	Episode: "Home Sweet Home"
2022	Sugar Mommy	Detective Wilde	Television film
