= Susanna Salonen =

Finnish-German film director

- Born: Lahti, Finland
- Occupations: Film director, writer, cinematographer
- Notable work: Patong Girl
- Website: salonen.de

Susanna Salonen is a Finnish-German film director, screenwriter and cinematographer. Born in 1966 in Finland, Salonen grew up in Lübeck and trained as a camerawoman in Berlin. She has shot several award-winning documentaries, and written and directed fiction films. Her fiction debut Patong Girl won the prestigious German Grimme award in 2016. Salonen is a member of the German film academy.

In 2020, she filmed in the central Arctic during the MOSAiC Expedition on German research-icebreaker Polarstern for the international documentary Arctic Drift on climate change research in the Arctic.
