= Do Lado de Fora =

2014 film directed by Alexandre Carvalho

- Brazilian theatrical poster
- Directed by: Alexandre Carvalho
- Written by: André Collazi
- Produced by: Alexandre Carvalho
- Starring: André Bankoff; Marcello Airoldi; Luis Fernando Vaz; Mauricio Evanns
- Production company: Fraiha Produções
- Distributed by: Elo Company
- Release date: 15 May 2014 (Brazil)
- Country: Brazil
- Language: Portuguese

Do Lado de Fora is a 2014 Brazilian comedy film directed by Alexandre Carvalho, starring André Bankoff, Marcello Airoldi, Luis Fernando Vaz and Mauricio Evanns.

The film follows the story of two teenagers who decide to go to the São Paulo Gay Pride Parade, encouraged by the uncle of one of them, a successful executive who lives a double life. After witnessing a scene of homophobic aggression, they decide to make a pact: everyone in the group must come out of the closet until the following year's event.

== Cast ==
- André Bankoff as Roger
- Marcello Airoldi as Vicente
- Luis Fernando Vaz as Mauro
- Mauricio Evanns as Rodrigo
- Silvetty Montilla
- Titi Muller
