= Maximilian Mauff =

German actor

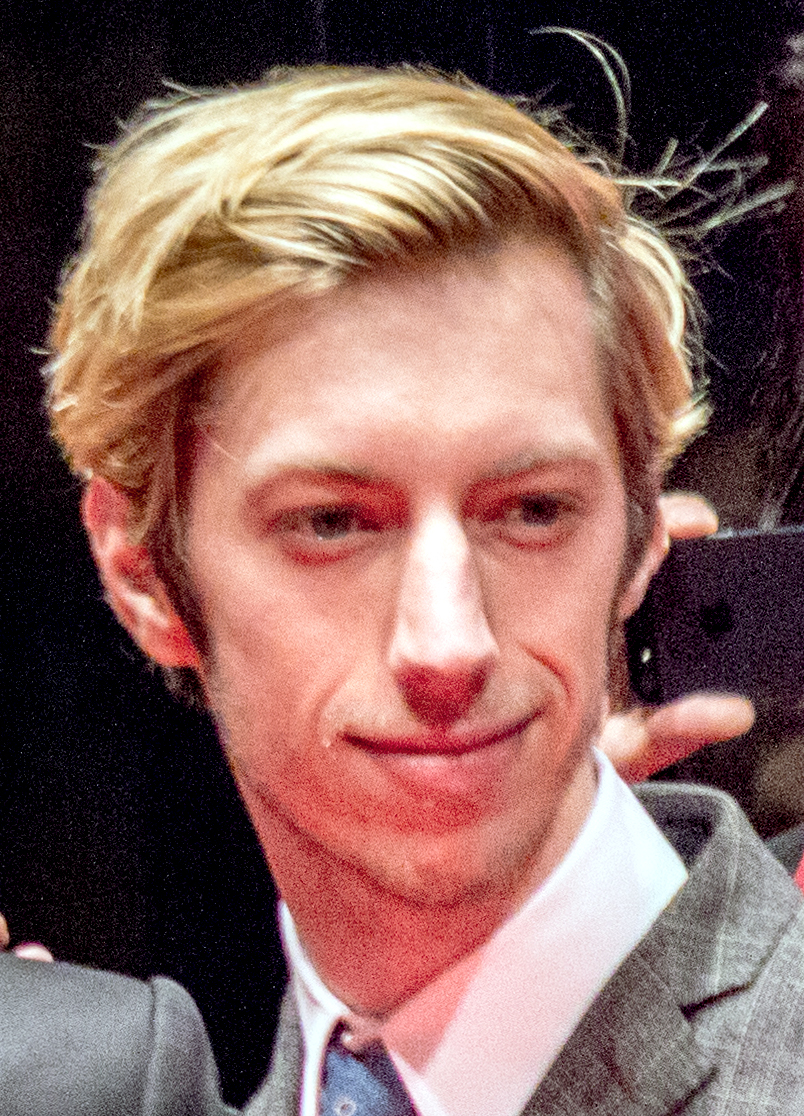
- Mauff at Berlinale 2015
- Born: 3 July 1987 (age 37); Berlin, Germany
- Occupation: Actor
- Years active: 1995–present

Maximilian “Max” Mauff (born 3 July 1987) is a German actor from Berlin. He appeared in films directed by Steven Spielberg, Terrence Malick and Wes Anderson.

== Life and career ==
Mauff started acting in the child theatre. Later he had first roles in short movies by Aelrun Goette. In 2002 he had his first leading role as Tristan in Kai Wessel's The Year of the First Kiss. In the following years he took roles in various German TV and film productions.

In 2015, Mauff had a recurring role in the American series Sense8. In the same year, he starred in the single-take German drama film, Victoria.

He played the lead role in the film Patong Girl, which won the Grimme Award in 2016.

Mauff regularly plays roles in German TV series such as Babylon Berlin and also appears in international productions.

== Partial filmography ==
- 1995: Besame Mucho (Short)
- 1999: Zug der Wünsche (Short)
- 2002: The Year of the First Kiss (Das Jahr der ersten Küsse) - Tristan
- 2004: Peas at 5:30 (Erbsen auf halb 6) - Ben
- 2005: Combat 16 - Philip Sander
- 2005: Measures to Better the World (Weltverbesserungsmaßnahmen) - David Krüger (segment "Aktive Krankenversicherung")
- 2005: Was ich von ihr weiß - Tom
- 2008: The Wave (Die Welle) - Kevin
- 2008: Absurdistan - Temelko
- 2008: Berlin Calling - Zivi Alex
- 2008: The Reader - Rudolf
- 2009: Locked - Chris
- 2009: Men in the City (Männerherzen) - Tobi
- 2009: Being Mr. Kotschie - Mario Kotschie
- 2011: Eine königliche Affäre - King Christian VII of Denmark
- 2012: Diaz – Don't Clean Up This Blood - Karl
- 2012: Closed Season (Ende der Schonzeit) - Bruno
- 2013: Hanna's Journey (Hannas Reise) - Carsten
- 2014: Stromberg – Der Film - Jonas
- 2014: Patong Girl - Felix Schröder
- 2015: Victoria - Fuß
- 2015: Bridge of Spies - Ott's Secretary
- 2015: Homeland (TV Series) - Gregor
- 2015-2018: Sense8 (TV Series, 9 episodes) - Felix Berner
- 2015: Weinberg (TV Mini-Series) - Kirk
- 2016: Jonathan - Lasse
- 2016: We Are the Tide - Micha
- 2016: Schweinskopf al dente - Verkäufer
- 2016: Conni & Co. - Pfleger
- 2016: Strawberry Bubblegums - Ronnie
- 2017: Die Unsichtbaren - Cioma Schönhaus
- 2018: Safari: Match Me If You Can - David
- 2019: Cleo - Zille
- 2019: A Hidden Life - Sterz
- 2019-2022: Babylon Berlin (TV series) - Jacky
- 2020-2023: MaPa (TV series) - Metin
- 2021: Matrix Resurrections - Quillion
- 2022: Souls (TV series) - Nils Peters
- 2024: Kafka (TV series) - Kralicek
- 2025: The Phoenician Scheme - Footman
