= Fresneda de Altarejos =

- Municipality
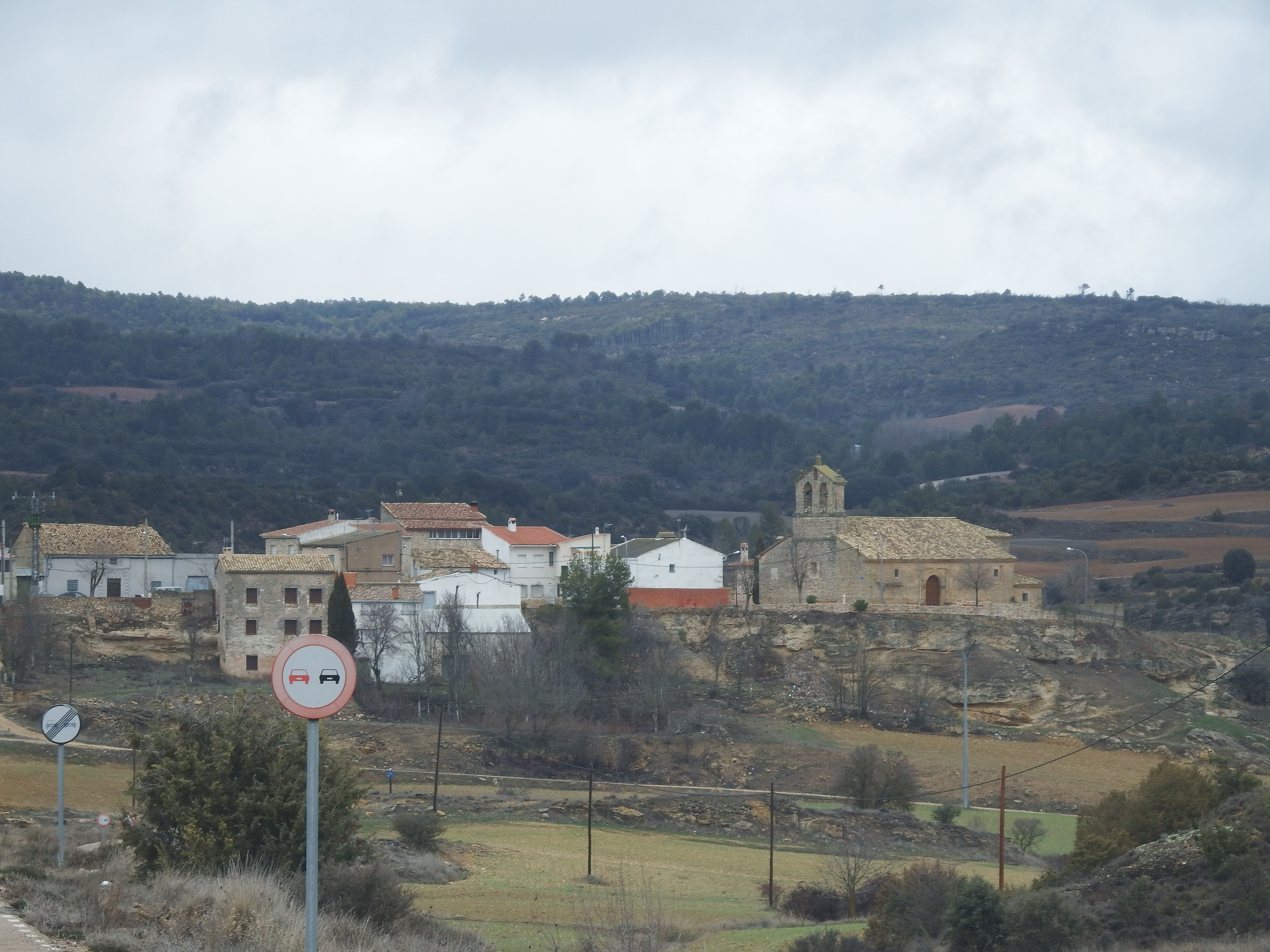

- Location within Spain Location within Castilla-La Mancha
- Coordinates: 39°56′N 2°19′W
- Country: Spain
- Autonomous community: Castile-La Mancha
- Province: Cuenca

Population (2025-01-01)
  - Total: 35
- Time zone: UTC+1 (CET)
  - Summer (DST): UTC+2 (CEST)

Fresneda de Altarejos is a municipality in Cuenca, Castile-La Mancha, Spain. It has a population of 49.
