= Barrio Boy =

2022 film directed by Dennis Shinners

- Theatrical film poster
- Directed by: Dennis Shinners
- Written by: Dennis Shinners
- Produced by: Crystal McIntosh; Dennis Shinners
- Starring: Dennis Garcia; James Physick
- Cinematography: Garrett Shannon
- Edited by: Dennis Shinners; Carl Vasile
- Release dates: October 14, 2022 (UK); April 27, 2024 (USA)
- Running time: 80 mins.
- Country: United States
- Language: English

Barrio Boy is a 2022 American LGBTQ romance film written and directed by Dennis Shinners. It is a remake of a 2014 short film of the same name. It follows a Nuyorican barber named Quique as he falls in love with a stranger he met in Brooklyn.

== Plot ==
The plot follows Quique, a Nuyorican barber quietly navigating his sexuality in a macho Brooklyn world, notices how his neighborhood has been changing in recent years. He is on a journey of self-discovery meeting men on dating apps when he realizes he is unhappy with his choice of partners. It is only when he happens upon a young Irish man, Kevin, at a basketball court that he begins to fall in love. Kevin is in Brooklyn due to the passing of his father and his need to settle the affairs surrounding his father's death. However, as Kevin and Quique's budding romance begins to deepen, Quique's homophobic old friend, Cuz, begins to threaten their relationship. Now Quique must learn to accept himself and reject the macho culture he has grown up in, or lose the love he is beginning to feel for Kevin.

== Cast ==
- Dennis Garcia - Quique
- James Physick - Kevin
- Keet Davis - Cuz
- Manny Ureña - Jorge
- Pierre Jean Gonzalez - Rafa
- Michael Borrelli - Seth
- Teresa Yenque - Abuela Rosa
- Caitlin Mehner - Shelly
- Andrea Morales - Nieves

== Production ==
This movie was produced by Crystal McIntosh as well as Dennis Shinners. The production companies handling the film were Cautious Films, The Lavender Tangent, and I Ain't Playin' Films.

== Reception ==
Phuong Le of The Guardian wrote about Barrio Boy, "Charismatic lead aside, a sketchy script and surfeit of stereotypes blight this tale of a secret gay love affair among New York's Latino community." The movie received 3 stars out of 5.
