= Julia Scheeres =

American writer

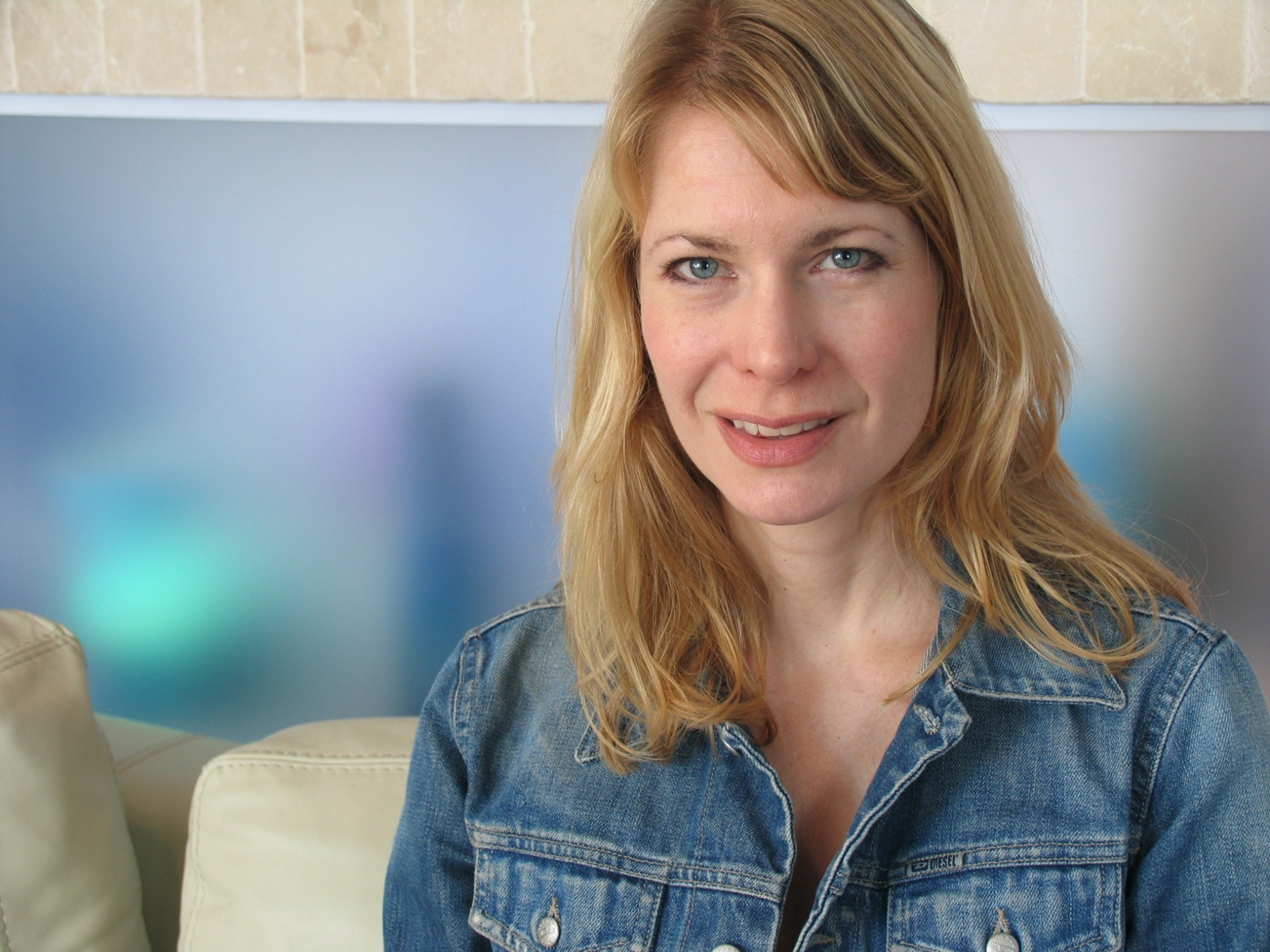
- Born: Lafayette, Indiana
- Occupations: Journalist, author
- Known for: Author of Jesus Land, A Thousand Lives
- Spouse: Tim Rose
- Children: Tessa Rose-Scheeres, Davia Rose-Scheeres
- Website: www.juliascheeres.com

Julia Scheeres is an American journalist and nonfiction author. Born in Lafayette, Indiana, Scheeres received a bachelor's degree in Spanish from Calvin College in Grand Rapids, Michigan, and a master's in journalism from the University of Southern California. Now living and working in San Francisco, California, she has been a contributor to the New York Times, Los Angeles Times, San Francisco Chronicle, Wired News, and LA Weekly. She is a 2006 recipient of the Alex Awards.

== Works ==
=== Jesus Land ===
Scheeres came to prominence with the 2005 publication of Jesus Land, a memoir of her turbulent youth growing up rebellious in a strict fundamentalist Christian family near West Lafayette, Indiana, including a harrowing stint in a Christian "reform school" in the Dominican Republic. The memoir is centered on her relationship with her adoptive brother David, of African-American ancestry (Scheeres is white), and on their shared experiences coping with both religious and racial intolerance, in Lafayette, including at William Henry Harrison High School. Scheeres has described the genesis of the book by stating, "I knew David better than anyone. From the time he was adopted at age three until he died in a car crash at age 20, we were in constant contact. We were the same age. We shared classrooms, church youth groups, even a reform school. It fell on my shoulders to keep his memory alive. This was a heavy burden."

Jesus Land was a New York Times bestseller, and a Times bestseller in the UK (where it was published under the title Another Hour on a Sunday Morning). The book was also the winner of the American Library Association's Alex Award and the New Visions Nonfiction Book Award. The trade publication Publishers Weekly declared the book "announces the author as a writer to watch," and the Boston Globe praised it as "rough, brutal, and shockingly good." She stated in her memoir that she is no longer a Christian but a humanist.

In December 2011, Escuela Caribe, the reform school featured in her memoir, was closed down due to a successful internet campaign by alumni to expose its 40-year history of child abuse. The property was transferred to another Christian ministry called Crosswinds, which reopened the school under the name Caribbean Mountain Academy. Although their website states their program is not affiliated with New Horizons Youth Ministries, as of 2014 at least five staff members from Escuela Caribe remained employed at the school after the transition.

In 2022, Jesus Land was listed among 52 books banned by the Alpine School District following the implementation of Utah law H.B. 374, “Sensitive Materials In Schools." Forty-two percent of removed books “feature LBGTQ+ characters and or themes.” Many of the books were removed because they were considered to contain pornographic material according to the new law, which defines porn using the following criteria:

- "The average person" would find that the material, on the whole, "appeals to prurient interest in sex"
- The material "is patently offensive in the description or depiction of nudity, sexual conduct, sexual excitement, sadomasochistic abuse, or excretion"
- The material, on the whole, "does not have serious literary, artistic, political or scientific value."

=== A Thousand Lives ===
In 2011, Scheeres published A Thousand Lives, an account of the Jonestown settlement and mass murder. Based on 50,000 pages of recently released FBI files and rare interviews with survivors, A Thousand Lives chronicles the lives of five Jonestown residents who moved to the jungle utopia in 1978 only to realize that their leader, Jim Jones, was a madman bent on killing them. Scheeres broke several stories while writing the book. She learned that Jones was planning to kill his followers for five years prior to actually doing it, and that his inner circle supported his plans for a "revolutionary suicide." She also found notes and memos from the camp doctor, Larry Schacht, who struggled to find a way to kill the 900+ residents of Jonestown and experimented with botulism and other bacteria before settling on cyanide.

A Thousand Lives was reviewed widely and critically acclaimed. The New York Times hailed the book as "a gripping account of how decent people can be taken in." The Los Angeles Times raved that "Scheeres convincingly portrays the members of this community as victims, not fools. It's hard to imagine how people might be so browbeaten, afraid and misled that they would bring about their own deaths—but Scheeres has made that terrifying story believable and human."

There are many parallels between her two books. Both deal with race, religion, and yearnings for utopia.

=== Listen, World! ===
Scheeres's third book, a biography of syndicated columnist Elsie Robinson, Listen, World! How the Intrepid Elsie Robinson Became America's Most-Read Woman, was written together with Allison Gilbert and published in September 2022 by Seal Press.

=== Other work ===
Scheeres is an officeholder at the San Francisco Writers' Grotto, where she teaches memoir workshops and works as a writing coach.

=== Notable journalism ===
- The Ballad of Tribute Steve, essay published in The New York Times.
- Raising Children Without Sin, essay published in The New York Times.
- Review, 'The Ash Family’ Is a Debut Novel for Our Climate-Anxious Age, in The New York Times
- Countdown to the Jonestown tragedy, published in Newsweek.
- Children of the Tribes, published in Pacific Standard.

== Awards ==
=== Jesus Land awards ===
- 2006 Alex Award from the American Library Association
- 2006 New Visions Nonfiction Book Award from the Quality Paperback Book Club

=== A Thousand Lives awards ===
- The Guardian's "Top 10 Books About the 1970s" list
- Winner, 2012 Best Nonfiction Book of the Year Award, Northern California Independent Booksellers
- A San Francisco Chronicle Best Book of 2011
- A Boston Globe Best Book of 2011

== Personal life ==
Julia Scheeres lives in Northern California with her family.
