= Joselito Altarejos =

Filipino film director

- Born: Ticao Island, Philippines
- Other names: Jose Altarejos, Jay Altajeros
- Occupations: Film director, film producer, screenwriter
- Years active: 1998–present

Joselito Altarejos is a Filipino filmmaker having won several awards in the Philippines as well as internationally. He is known for gay-themed film features like The Man in the Lighthouse (in Tagalog Ang Lalake sa Parola), Antonio's Secret (in Tagalog Ang Lihim ni Antonio), Kambyo, The Game of Juan's Life (in Tagalog Ang Laro ng Buhay ni Juan ), Pink Halo-Halo, Unfriend, The Commitment (in Tagalog Kasal). His 2017 film Tale of the Lost Boys was filmed in Taiwan.

== Career ==
Unfriend premiered at the Panorama Section of the 2014 Berlinale (Berlin International Film Festival) and got international and local media attention for highlighting the "dangerous power of social media". Unfriend has been featured by major news organizations like Reuters, Huffington Post, ABS CBN and Philippine Daily Inquirer. It was released internationally by Fortissimo Films.

In 2017, Altarejos released Tale of the Lost Boys, his first international feature, shot and produced in Taiwan. It is a story of friendship between a straight Filipino man and a gay Taiwanese aborigine who both have issues regarding their identities. It has been screened at several international festivals, including Rainbow Reel Tokyo, New York Lesbian, Gay, Bisexual, & Transgender Film Festival (NewFest), Taiwan International Queer Film Festival among others. In 2018, Altarejos made a comeback to Sinag Maynila International Film Festival in the Philippines with the film.

Altarejos has also worked for television doing series and anthologies for Philippines top networks GMA and TV5. Using the names Jay Altarejos and Jay Altajeros (keeping the name Joselito Altarejos to his big screen features), he has directed a number of television series, notably the youth-oriented POSH and the long-running 98-episode TV series Legacy on the GMA Network.

The Revolution Knows No Gender (Filipino: Walang Kasarian Ang Digmang Bayan), directed and written by Altarejos, was set to release at an independent film festival in Manila in February 2020. The film was disqualified for deviating from a previously approved script and removed from the festival. Altarejos alleged that the decision to not screen his film was politically motivated censorship.

== Awards and nominations ==
=== Wins ===
- 2010 Festival de la Luna, the Valencia International Gay and Lesbian Film Festival: Won "Best Film" for Antonio's Secret.
- 2010 Cinemalaya Independent Film Festival: Won "Best Edit" for Pink Halo-Halo.
- 2014 Cinemalaya Independent Film Festival: Winner for "Best Film - Director's Showcase" (to director Joselito Altarejos for directing of Kasal) During the festival, it also won the "Cinematography" - Director's Showcase" category (to Mycko David), "Production Design" - Director's Showcase" (to Harley Alcasid) and "Original Music" - Director's Showcase" (to Richard Gonzales) all for their work in Kasal)
- 2015 Gawad Tanglaw: Jury Prize for Best Film (to Joselito Altarejos for his film Kasal)
- 2016 Sinag Maynila Independent Film Festival: Winner for "Best Screenplay" for his film in T.P.O. (Temporary Protection Order". During the festival, it also won the "Sound Design" (to Andrew Millalos).
- 2017 Serile Filmului International Film Festival: Winner for "Best Film" for Tale of the Lost Boys
- 2018 Sinag Maynila International Film Festival: Winner for "Best Film" for Tale of the Lost Boys. During the festival, it also won "Best Screenplay" (for May delos Santos) and "Best Editing" (for Diego Marx Dobles and Box Office Film).

=== Nominations ===
- 2008 Philippines FAP Awards: Nominated for "Best Production Design" (to Ma. Asuncion Torres and Anna Carmela Manda for their work in The Man in the Lighthouse)
- 2008 Philippines Golden Screen Awards: Nominated for "Best Performance by an Actor in a Supporting Role in a Drama, Musical or Comedy" (for Justin De Leon in his role as Jerome in The Man in the Lighthouse)
- 2010 Cinemalaya Independent Film Festival: Nominated for "Best Film - Directors Showcase" (to director Joselito Altarejos for directing of Pink Halo-Halo)
- 2010 Cinemalaya Independent Film Festival: Winner of Special Jury Prize: Films for Children for Pink Halo-Halo)
- 2014 Berlin International Film Festival: Nominated for "Best Film for "Unfriend" that premiered at the Panorama Section of the Berlinale)

== Filmography ==
=== Director ===
Films and features

(all in Philippines, except Tale of the Lost Boys in Taiwan)

- 2007: The Man in the Lighthouse (in Tagalog Ang Lalake sa Parola)
- 2008: Antonio's Secret (in Tagalog title: Ang Lihim ni Antonio)
- 2009: Little Boy Big Boy
- 2009: The Game of Juan's Life (in Tagalog Ang Laro ng Buhay ni Juan)
- 2010: Pink Halo-Halo
- 2010: Boy Toys (in Tagalog Laruang Lalake)
- 2014: Unfriend
- 2014: The Commitment (in Tagalog Kasal)
- 2016: T.P.O. (also known as Temporary Protection Order)
- 2016: Death by Gokkun
- 2017: Tale of the Lost Boys
- 2019: Jino to Mari (Gino and Marie)
- 2020: Love and Pain in Between Refrains
- 2020: The Revolution Knows No Gender (Walang Kasarian Ang Digmang Bayan)

TV series

- 1998: Ganyan Kita Kamahal (TV series)
- 1998: Halik sa Apoy (TV series)
- 2006: POSH (TV series) (credited as Jay Altarejos)
- 2008: Dear Friend (TV series)
- 2011: My Lover, My Wife (TV series) (as Jay Altajeros)
- 2011: Blusang Itim (TV series)
- 2011: Kung Aagawin Mo ang Langit (TV series)
- 2012: Legacy (TV series) (98 episodes) (as Jay Altarejos, co-directed with Andoy Ranay)
- 2014: Obsession (TV series) (as Jay Altarejos)
- 2014-2015: Wattpad Presents series (all as Jay Altarejos):
  - 2014: Wattpad Presents: Mr. Popular Meets Miss Nobody (5 episodes)
  - 2014: Wattpad Presents: Poser (5 episodes)
  - 2014: Wattpad Presents: Mr. Popular Meets Miss Nobody: Still In Love (5 episodes)
  - 2015: Wattpad Presents: BitterElla
  - 2015: Wattpad Presents: Heartbreaker
  - 2015: Wattpad Presents: Marry You

=== Producer ===
- 2007: Ang Lalake sa Parola (The Man in the Lighthouse) (line producer)
- 2008: Ang Lihim ni Antonio (Antonio's Secret) (line producer)
- 2008: Kambyo (line producer)
- 2010: Pink Halo-Halo (producer)
- 2010: Laruang Lalake (Boy Toys (co-producer) (credited as Joselito Altarejós)
- 2013: Unfriend (producer)
- 2014: Kasal (The Commitment) (executive producer / producer)
- 2016: T.P.O. (producer)

=== Writer ===
- 2007: Ang Lalake sa Parola (The Man in the Lighthouse) (story)
- 2008: Ang Lihim ni Antonio (story)
- 2008: Kambyo (story)
- 2009: Ang laro ng buhay ni Juan (screenplay)
- 2010: Pink Halo-Halo (screenplay)
- 2014: Kasal (The Commitment) (story)
- 2016: T.P.O. (story)
- 2016: Death by Gokkun (story)
