= List of LGBTQ-related films by storyline =

This is a list of films with lesbian, gay, bisexual, and transgender-related storylines. This list contains theatrically released cinema films that highlight the issues and experiences of the LGBTQ community through the inclusion of LGBTQ romance and relationships.

The films are organized by storyline, arranged alphabetically, by year, by country of filming, and by production.

== Biographical films ==
- Amen, India (2010)
- Amphetamine, Hong Kong (2010)
- Beautiful Boxer, Thailand (2003)
- Before Night Falls, United States (2000)
- Bohemian Rhapsody, United States (2018)
- Capote, Canada/United States (2005)
- Caravaggio, United Kingdom (1986)
- Cazuza - O Tempo Não Pára, Brazil (2004)
- The Christine Jorgensen Story, United States (1970)
- City Without Baseball, Hong Kong (2008)
- Dahmer, United States (2002)
- Deathmaker, Germany (1995)
- De-Lovely, United States (2004)
- Gacy, United States (2003)
- The Girl King, Sweden (2015)
- Gods and Monsters, United Kingdom (1998)
- Halston (2019)
- I Am My Own Woman, Germany (1992)
- The Imitation Game, United States/United Kingdom (2014)
- Infamous, United States (2006)
- Love Actually... Sucks!, Hong Kong (2011)
- Love Is the Devil: Study for a Portrait of Francis Bacon, United Kingdom (1998)
- Madame Satã, Brazil (2002)
- Milk, United States (2008)
- Monster, United States (2003)
- My Friend Dahmer, United States (2017)
- Permanent Residence, Hong Kong (2009)
- Soundless Wind Chime, Hong Kong/Switzerland/China (2009)
- Tarnation, United States (2003)
- Wilde, United Kingdom (1997)

== Historical fiction and nonfiction ==
=== Fantasy ===
- Dorian Gray, Ireland (2009)
- Nimona, United States (2023)

=== Gay bars ===
- Last Call at Maud's, United States (1993)
- Small Town Gay Bar, United States (2006)

=== Historic events ===
- Aishite Imasu 1941: Mahal Kita, Philippines (2004)
- Dog Day Afternoon, United States (1975)
- Pride, United Kingdom (2014)
- Screaming Queens: The Riot at Compton's Cafeteria, United States (2005)
- Stonewall, United States (1995)
- Stonewall Uprising, United States (2010)
- Taking Woodstock, United States (2009)

=== HIV/AIDS ===
- Bohemian Rhapsody, United States (2018)
- BPM (Beats Per Minute), France (2017)
- Buddies, United States (1985)
- Cazuza - O Tempo Não Pára, Brazil (2004)
- Dallas Buyers Club, United States (2013)
- The Living End, United States (1992)
- Longtime Companion, United States (1989)
- Parting Glances, United States (1986)
- Philadelphia, United States (1993)
- Red Ribbon Blues, United States (1996)
- Rent, United States (2005)
- Three Months, United States (2022)
- Zero Patience, Canada (1993)

=== In the media ===
- The Celluloid Closet, United States (1996)
- The Watermelon Woman, United States (1996)

=== Persecution ===
- Bent, United Kingdom/Japan (1997)
- Coming Out Under Fire, United States (1994)
- Dangerous Living: Coming Out in the Developing World, United States (2003)
- Out in the Dark, Israeli (2012)
- Paragraph 175, Germany (2000)
- Proteus, Canada/South Africa (2003)
- Serving in Silence: The Margarethe Cammermeyer Story, United States (1995)
- Small Town Gay Bar, United States (2006)
- Word Is Out: Stories of Some of Our Lives, United States (1977)

=== Study of sexuality ===
- Die andere Liebe (The Other Love), East Germany (1988)
- Der Einstein des Sex, Germany (1999)
- Kinsey, United States (2004)
- Paris Is Burning, United States (1990)
- Plata Quemada, Argentina (2000)

== Relationships ==
=== Bisexual relationships ===
- Allure, Canada (2017)
- Amphetamine, Hong Kong (2010)
- Another Way, Hungary (1982)
- Atomic Blonde, United States (2017)
- Bad Romance, China (2011)
- Borstal Boy, United Kingdom/Ireland (2000)
- Call Me by Your Name, Italy/United States (2017)
- Cazuza - O Tempo Não Pára, Brazil (2004)
- Challengers, United States (2024)
- City Without Baseball, Hong Kong (2008)
- Cloud Atlas, United States (2012)
- Cold Showers, France (2005)
- Colette, United Kingdom/United States/Hungary (2018)
- The Dying Gaul, United States (2005)
- Fire Song, Canada (2015)
- Floating Skyscrapers, Poland (2013)
- Head On, Australia (1998)
- Kinsey, United States (2004)
- Kissing Jessica Stein, United States (2001)
- Love Actually... Sucks!, Hong Kong (2011)
- The Man Who Loved Yngve, Norway (2008)
- Nowhere, United States (1997)
- Nymphomaniac, Denmark (2013)
- Permanent Residence, Hong Kong (2009)
- The Pillow Book, France/United Kingdom/Netherlands/Luxembourg (1996)
- Pleasure Factory, Singapore/Thailand
- Puccini for Beginners, United States (2006)
- Red, White & Royal Blue, United States (2023)
- See You in Hell, My Darling, Greece (1999)
- Sex of Angels, Spain (2012)
- Shortbus, United States (2006)
- Singapore Sling, Greece (1990)
- Speechless, Hong Kong/China (2012)
- Three, Germany (2010)
- Vicky Cristina Barcelona, United States/Spain (2008)

==== With tragedy ====
- El diputado, Spain (1978)

=== Gay male relationships ===
- Adam & Steve, United States (2005)
- Amen, India (2010)
- Amphetamine, Hong Kong (2010)
- And Then We Danced, Georgia/Sweden (2019)
- Ang Lihim ni Antonio, Philippines (2008)
- Another Gay Movie, United States (2006)
- Antique, South Korea (2008)
- Apart From Hugh, United States (1994)
- Bad Education, Spain (2004)
- Bad Romance, China (2011)
- Beautiful Thing, United Kingdom (1996)
- Being 17, France (2016)
- Berlin Drifters, Japan/Germany (2017)
- The Blossoming of Maximo Oliveros, Philippines (2005)
- Borstal Boy, United Kingdom/Ireland (2000)
- Boy, Philippines (2009)
- The Boy and the Wind, Brazil (1967)
- Boyfriends, United Kingdom (1996)
- The Boys in the Band, United States (1970)
- Boys Love, Japan (2006)
- Brokeback Mountain, United States (2005)
- Broken Sky, Mexico (2006)
- The Bubble, Israel (2006)
- Buddies, United States (1985)
- Bugis Street, Singapore/Hong Kong (1995)
- La Cage aux Folles, France (1978)
- Call Me by Your Name, Italy/United States (2017)
- Capital Games, United States (2013)
- Chaaya Chobi, India 2009
- City Without Baseball, Hong Kong (2008)
- Clandestinos, Spain (2007)
- Clapham Junction, United Kingdom (2007)
- Coffee Date, United States (2006)
- Cold Showers, France (2005)
- Coming Out, East Germany (1989)
- C.R.A.Z.Y., Canada (2005)
- The Curiosity of Chance, United States (2006)
- Desire Street, Spain, China, United States (2011)
- Do Começo ao Fim, Brazil (2009)
- Eat With Me, United States (2014)
- Edge of Seventeen, United States (1998)
- Ernesto, Italy (1979)
- Eternal Summer, Taiwan (2006)
- Eyes Wide Open, Israel (2009)
- Fire Island, United States (2022)
- The Flavor of Corn, Italy (1986)
- For a Lost Soldier, Netherlands (1992)
- Formula 17, Taiwan (2004)
- Fox and His Friends, West Germany (1975)
- Freier Fall, Germany (2013)
- The Gemini, Myanmar (2016)
- Geography Club, United States (2013)
- Get Real, United Kingdom (1998)
- Goa, India (2010)
- God's Own Country, United Kingdom (2017)
- Gohatto (Taboo), Japan (1999)
- Gone But Not Forgotten, United States (2003)
- Grande École, France (2004)
- Hamam, Italy/Turkey/Spain (1997)
- Happy Together, Hong Kong (1997)
- Hawaii, Argentina (2013)
- Hidden Away, Spain (2014)
- Hold You Tight, Hong Kong (1998)
- Holding Trevor, United States (2007)
- I Love You Phillip Morris, United States (2009)
- I'm The Only One Who Love You, Malaysia (2012)
- Jeffrey, United States (1995)
- Jesús, Chile/France/Germany/Greece (2016)
- Jongens, The Netherlands (2014)
- Just a Question of Love, France (2000)
- Lan Yu, China (2001)
- Latter Days, United States (2003)
- Law of Desire, Spain (1987)
- Like It Is, United Kingdom (1998)
- Loose Cannons, Italy (2010)
- Lost, Vietnam (2014)
- Lost in Paradise, Vietnam (2011)
- Love Actually... Sucks!, Hong Kong (2011)
- Love of Siam, Thailand (2007)
- Love, Simon, United States (2018)
- Love Songs (Les Chansons d'amour), France (2007)
- Lucky Blue, Sweden (2007)
- Make the Yuletide Gay, United States (2009)
- Making Love, United States (1982)
- Mala Noche, United States (1986)
- Mambo Italiano, Canada (2003)
- Maurice, United Kingdom (1987)
- Memories in March, India (2010)
- Mentiras y Gordas, Spain (2009)
- Moonlight, United States (2016)
- The Most Desired Man, U.S. title: Maybe ... Maybe Not, Germany 1994
- Mulligans, Canada (2008)
- My Beautiful Laundrette, United Kingdom (1985)
- My Fair Son, China (2005)
- Nimona, United States (2023)
- No Regret, South Korea (2006)
- North Sea Texas, Belgium (2011)
- Nuovo Olimpo, Italy (2023)
- La Otra Familia, Mexico (2011)
- Penis In The Bottle, Malaysia (2011)
- Permanent Residence, Hong Kong (2009)
- Petrang Kabayo, Philippines (2010)
- The Pillow Book, France/United Kingdom/Netherlands/Luxembourg (1996)
- Pit Stop, United States (2013)
- Pleasure Factory, Thailand/Singapore (2007)
- Presque Rien, France (2000)
- Prick Up Your Ears, United Kingdom (1987)
- Pride, United Kingdom (2014)
- Private Lessons, Belgium, France (2008)
- Private Romeo, United States (2011)
- Quick Change, Philippines (2013)
- Rainbow Without Colours (Cầu vồng không sắc), Vietnam (2015)
- Refugee's Welcome, Spain/Germany (2017)
- Red, White & Royal Blue, United States (2023)
- The River, Taiwan (1997)
- Road Movie, South Korea (2002)
- Romeos, Germany (2011)
- Running with Scissors, United States (2006)
- Shelter, United States (2007)
- Shortbus, United States (2006)
- Sibak: Midnight Dancers, Philippines (1994)
- Somewhere I Have Never Traveled, Taiwan (2009)
- Soundless Wind Chime, Hong Kong/China/Switzerland (2009)
- Speechless, Hong Kong/China (2012)
- Star Appeal, China (2004)
- Summer Storm, Germany (2004)
- Sunday Bloody Sunday, United Kingdom (1971)
- Taxi zum Klo, Germany (1981)
- The Hours and Times, United States (1991)
- Summer of 85 , France (2020)
- Those People, United States (2015)
- Thưa mẹ con đi, Vietnam (2019)
- Toast, United Kingdom (2010)
- The Toilers and the Wayfarers, United States (1997)
- Torch Song Trilogy, United States (1988)
- Total Eclipse, United Kingdom/France/Belgium/Italy(1995)
- Touch of Pink, United Kingdom/Canada (2004)
- Trick, United States (1999)
- The Trip, United States (2002)
- Triple Crossed, United States (2013)
- Two Weddings and a Funeral, South Korea (2012)
- Under One Roof, United States (2002)
- The Unkabogable Praybeyt Benjamin, Philippines (2011)
- Utopians, Hong Kong/Taiwan (2015)
- Voyage, Hong Kong (2013)
- The Way He Looks, Brazil (2014)
- Thirty Years of Adonis, Hong Kong/Taiwan (2017)
- The Wedding Banquet, Taiwan (1993)
- Were the World Mine, United States (2008)
- Yossi, Israel (2012)
- Yossi & Jagger, Israel (2002)
- You Are Not Alone, Denmark (1978)

=== Lesbian female relationships ===
- All About E, Australia (2015)
- All About Love, Hong Kong (2010)
- Alto, United States (2015)
- Ammonite, United Kingdom/Australia (2020)
- Anatomy of a Love Seen, United States (2014)
- Another Way, Hungary (1982)
- Ashley, United States (2013)
- Ava's Impossible Things, United States (2016)
- Bad Romance, China (2011)
- Below Her Mouth, Canada (2016)
- Better Than Chocolate, Canada (1999)
- The Bitter Tears of Petra von Kant, Germany (1972)
- Bloomington, United States (2010)
- Blue, Japan (2002)
- Blue Is the Warmest Colour, France (2013)
- Bound, United States (1996)
- The Carmilla Movie, Canada (2017)
- Carol, United Kingdom/United States (2015)
- Chloe, United States/France/Canada (2009)
- Circumstance, Iran (2011)
- Cloudburst, Canada (2011)
- D.E.B.S., United States (2003)
- D.E.B.S., United States (2004)
- Desert Hearts, United States (1985)
- Disobedience, United Kingdom/Ireland/United States (2017)
- Drifting Flowers, Taiwan (2008)
- Drive-Away Dolls, United States (2024)
- Ek Ladki Ko Dekha Toh Aisa Laga, India (2019)
- Elena Undone, United States (2010)
- The Favourite, United Kingdom/Ireland/United States (2018)
- Fingersmith, United Kingdom (2005)
- Fire, India/Canada (1996)
- First Girl I Loved, United States (2016)
- The Four-Faced Liar, United States (2010)
- Frauensee (Woman's Lake), Germany (2012)
- Fucking Åmål, Sweden (1998)
- The Girl, France/United States (2000)
- Go Fish, United States (1994)
- Gray Matters, United States (2006)
- The Guest House, United States (2012)
- The Handmaiden, South Korea (2016)
- Happiest Season, United States (2020)
- I Can't Think Straight, United States/United Kingdom (2008)
- If These Walls Could Talk 2, United States (2000)
- Imagine Me & You, United Kingdom (2005)
- The Incredibly True Adventure of Two Girls in Love, United States (1995)
- Itty Bitty Titty Committee, United States (2007)
- Jack and Diane, United States (2012)
- Joe + Belle, Israel (2011)
- Julie Johnson, United States (2001)
- The Kids Are All Right, United States (2010)
- The Killing of Sister George, United Kingdom (1968)
- Kissing Jessica Stein, United States (2001)
- Lianna, United States (1983)
- Liz in September, Venezuela (2014)
- Lost and Delirious, Canada (2001)
- Love, Vietnam (2015)
- Love Actually... Sucks!, Hong Kong (2011)
- Love Lies Bleeding, United States/United Kingdom (2024)
- Love My Life, Japan (2006)
- Loving Annabelle, United States (2006)
- Mädchen in Uniform, Germany (1931)
- Me, Myself and Her, Italy (2015)
- My Days of Mercy, United States/United Kingdom (2017)
- My Summer of Love, United Kingdom (2004)
- Nina's Heavenly Delights, United Kingdom (2006)
- Pariah, United States (2011)
- Personal Best, United States (1982)
- Portrait of a Lady on Fire, France (2019)
- Purple Sea, Italy (2009)
- Raven's Touch, United States (2015)
- Rent, United States (2005)
- Rome and Juliet, Philippines (2006)
- Room in Rome, Spain (2010)
- Saving Face, United States (2004)
- Shirley, United States (2020)
- Soongava: Dance of the Orchids, Nepal (2012)
- Spider Lilies, Taiwan (2007)
- Snapshots, United States (2018)
- Summer of Mesa, United States (2020)
- The Summer of Sangailė, Lithuania (2015)
- Tell It to the Bees, United Kingdom (2018)
- Thelma, Norway (2017)
- Tipping the Velvet, United Kingdom (2002)
- The Truth About Jane, United States (2000)
- Two Weddings and a Funeral, South Korea (2012)
- Unexpected (a.k.a. I Want You), Germany (2014)
- Vita & Virginia, United Kingdom/Ireland (2018)
- Water Lilies, France (2007)
- The Watermelon Woman, United States (1996)
- When Night Is Falling, Canada (1995)
- Die Wilden Hühner und die Liebe, Germany (2007)
- With Every Heartbeat (original title: Kyss Mig), Sweden (2011)
- A Woman Like Eve, Netherlands (1979)
- Women's Club, France (1936)
- The World to Come, United States (2020)
- The World Unseen, United Kingdom/South Africa (2007)
- Yes or No, Thailand (2010)

==== With tragedy ====
- Affinity, United Kingdom (2008)
- Aimée and Jaguar, Germany (1999)
- Another Way, Hungary (1982)
- April's Shower, United States (2003)
- Black Swan, United States (2010)
- But I'm a Cheerleader, United States (1999)
- The Children's Hour, United States (1961)
- The Edge of Heaven, Germany (2007)
- Even Cowgirls Get the Blues, United States (1993)
- Gekijōban Zero, Japan (2014)
- Gia, United States (1998)
- Heavenly Creatures, New Zealand (1994)
- High Art, United States (1998)
- The Hours, United States (2002)
- Immacolata and Concetta: The Other Jealousy, Italy (1980)
- Je te mangerais, France (2009)
- Lost & Delirious, Canada (2001)
- Love Actually... Sucks!, Hong Kong (2011)
- Love and Suicide, United States (2006)
- Memento Mori, South Korea (1999)
- Monster, United States (2003)
- Mulholland Drive, United States (2001)
- Producing Adults, Finland (2004)
- Roommate, Japan (2013)
- Spike, United States (2008)
- ToY, United States (2015)
- V for Vendetta, United States (2006)

==== With conversion therapy ====
- But I'm a Cheerleader, United States (1999)
- The Miseducation of Cameron Post, United States (2018)
- Trapped: The Alex Cooper Story. United States (2019)

=== Parenting ===
- The Adventures of Priscilla, Queen of the Desert, Australia (1994)
- Bear Cub, Spain (2004)
- The Birdcage, United States (1996)
- Breakfast with Scot, Canada (2007)
- Chef's Special, Spain (2008)
- C.R.A.Z.Y., Canada (2005)
- Make the Yuletide Gay, United States (2009)
- The Next Best Thing, United States (2000)
- La Otra Familia, Mexico (2011)
- Sasha, Germany (2010)
- Shelter, United States (2007)
- Patrik 1,5, Sweden (2008)
- Transamerica, United States (2005)
- Ideal Home, United States (2018)

==== With tragedy ====
- Les amitiés particulières, France (1964)
- Amphetamine, Hong Kong (2010)
- Another Country, United Kingdom (1984)
- Bad Romance, China (2011)
- Bangkok Love Story , Thailand (2007)
- Brokeback Mountain, United States (2005)
- Brotherhood, Denmark (2009)
- The Bubble, Israel (2006)
- Bungee Jumping of Their Own, South Korea (2001)
- Cầu Vồng Không Sắc (Rainbow Without Colours), Vietnam (2015)
- Center of My World, Germany (2016)
- Ciao, United States (2008)
- City Without Baseball, Hong Kong (2008)
- Cloud Atlas, United States (2012)
- C.R.A.Z.Y., Canada (2005)
- The Crying Game, United Kingdom (1992)
- Daybreak, Philippines (2008)
- De-Lovely, United States (2004) (see also biographical)
- Drowning, Australia (2009)
- Der Einstein des Sex, Germany (1999), released subtitled as the Einstein of Sex in the US
- Die Konsequenz, West Germany (1977)
- Different from the Others, Germany (1919)
- Fox and His Friends, West Germany (1975)
- A Frozen Flower, South Korea (2008)
- Hate Crime, United States (2005)
- Holding the Man, Australia (2015)
- A Home at the End of the World, United States (2004)
- House of Boys, Luxembourg/West Germany (2009)
- Hide and Seek, Israel (1980)
- In a Glass Cage, Spain (1986)
- In My Life, Philippines (2009)
- It's My Party, United States (1996)
- It Is Not the Homosexual Who Is Perverse, But the Society in Which He Lives, West Germany (1971)
- Jolly Fellows, Russia (2009)
- The King and the Clown, South Korea (2005)
- Lan Yu, China (2001)
- L.I.E., United States (2001)
- Longtime Companion, United States (1989)
- Lost, Vietnam (2014)
- Lost in Paradise, Vietnam (2011)
- Love Actually... Sucks!, Hong Kong (2011)
- A Love to Hide (Un amour à taire), France (2005)
- Madame Satã, Brazil (2002)
- Miller's Crossing, United States (1990)
- Mysterious Skin, United States (2004)
- No Night Is Too Long, United Kingdom (2002)
- The Normal Heart, United States (2014)
- Permanent Residence, Hong Kong (2009)
- Philadelphia, United States (1993)
- Prayers for Bobby, United States (2009)
- Proteus, Canada/South Africa (2003)
- Rent, United States (2005)
- Taxi zum Klo, West Germany (1981)
- The Sea, Spain (2000)
- A Single Man, United States (2009)
- Somewhere I Have Never Traveled, Taiwan (2009)
- Soundless Wind Chime, Hong Kong/China/Switzerland (2009)
- Toto Forever, Spain/United States (2009)
- The Trip, United States (2002)
- Twist, Canada (2003)
- Twisted, United States (1996)
- Undertow, Peru (2009)
- Voyage, Hong Kong (2013)
- We All Die Alone, United States (2021)
- Weekend, United Kingdom (2011)
- The Yacoubian Building, Egypt (2006)
- Yossi & Jagger, Israel (2002)

==== With conversion therapy ====
- Latter Days, United States (2003)
- Maurice, United Kingdom (1987)
- Save Me, United States (2007)
- Boy Erased, United States (2018)
- Deviant, United States (2018)
- This Is What Love in Action Looks Like, United States (2011) (Documentary Film)

=== Transgender ===
- The Adventures of Priscilla, Queen of the Desert, Australia (1994)
- Better Than Chocolate, Canada (1999)
- Bugis Street, Hong Kong/Singapore (1995)
- Come Back to the Five and Dime, Jimmy Dean, Jimmy Dean, United States (1982)
- The Crying Game, United Kingdom (1992)
- Different for Girls, United Kingdom (1996)
- A Fantastic Woman, Chile (2017)
- Girl, Belgium (2018)
- Glen or Glenda, United States (1953)
- Just Charlie, United Kingdom (2017)
- Laurence Anyways, Canada (2012)
- Ma vie en rose, Belgium (1997)
- Romeos, Germany (2011)
- Tangerine, United States (2015)
- Transamerica, United States (2005)
- 3 Generations, United States (2015)

==== With tragedy ====
- Boys Don't Cry, United States (1999)
- Cheila: Una Casa Pa' Maita, Venezuela (2009)
- The Danish Girl, United Kingdom (2015)
- Emilia Pérez, France (2024)
- Funeral Parade of Roses, Japan (1969)
- A Girl Like Me: The Gwen Araujo Story, United States (2006)
- Gotta Get Down to It, United States (2019)
- I Saw the TV Glow, United States (2024)
- Soldier's Girl, United States (2003)
- Strella, Greece (2009)
- Yellow Hair 2, South Korea (2001)

== See also ==
- List of LGBTQ+-related films - sorted alphabetically
- List of LGBT-related films by year
- List of LGBT-related films directed by women
