= Simon Chung =

Hong Kong film director

Simon Chung Tak-Sing
- Born: Hong Kong
- Education: York University, Toronto; Hong Kong Baptist University; Chinese University of Hong Kong
- Occupations: Film director Ancestral hometown: Huizhou, Guangdong province, China Languages spoken: Cantonese, Mandarin, English, French
- Years active: 2000s–present
- Awards: 2009 Hong Kong Independent Short Film and Video Awards (IFVA); Distinguished Award; End of Love 2005 Toronto Reel Asian International Film Festival; NFB Best Canadian Film Award; Innocent 1997 Image Forum Festival; Special Jury Prize; Life is Elsewhere

Chinese name
- Traditional Chinese: 鍾德勝
Transcriptions

Simon Chung Tak-sing (Chinese: 鍾德勝) is a Hong Kong film director. His films include Innocent, released in 2005, End of Love which premiered at the 59th Berlin International Film Festival in 2009, and Speechless, released in 2012, and which premiered at the BFI 26th London Lesbian and Gay Film Festival (since renamed BFI Flare: London LGBTIQ+ Film Festival), on 28 March 2012. Chung is gay.

== Early life and education ==
Chung was born and brought up in Hong Kong, and from the age of fifteen, in the city of Toronto in Canada, where he attended high school. He was later educated at York University in Toronto, where he majored in Film, followed by Hong Kong Baptist University, in Kowloon Tong in Hong Kong, where he made his first independent films in the technical department and at the Chinese University of Hong Kong in Shatin, in Hong Kong's New Territories, where he took a master's degree in Cultural Studies.

== Life and career ==
Chung's first film short was Chiwawa Express, made in 1992. His first full-length feature film, Innocent, made in 2005, premiered at the Hong Kong International Film Festival and won the NFB Best Canadian Film Award at the Toronto Reel Asian International Film Festival. His second feature, End of Love, premiered at the Berlin International Film Festival in 2009, while his third, Speechless, premiered at the BFI London Lesbian and Gay Film Festival. He is a founding member of Ying e Chi, an independent film distributor in Hong Kong.

== Filmography ==
- I Miss You When I See You (2018)
- Speechless (2012)
- End of Love (2009)
- Innocent (2005)

== Film shorts ==
- First Love and Other Pains (1999)
- Stanley Beloved (1998)
- Life is Elsewhere (1996)
- Chiwawa Express (1992)

== Awards ==
- Distinguished Award for End of Love at the 2009 Hong Kong Independent Short Film and Video Awards (IFVA)
- NFB Best Canadian Film Award for Innocent at the 2005 Toronto Reel Asian International Film Festival
- Special Jury Prize for Life is Elsewhere at the 1997 Image Forum Festival in Japan

== See also ==
- Cinema of Hong Kong

=== Other Chinese LGBT film directors ===
- Cui Zi'en
- Kit Hung
- Stanley Kwan
- Quentin Lee
- Zihan Loo
- Scud
- Yonfan
