= Love and Suicide =

Love and Suicide may refer to:

- Love and Suicide (2005 film), an American drama film directed by Lisa France
- Love and Suicide (2006 film), an American drama film directed by Mia Salsi
