= The Shirtless Violinist =

American YouTuber and musician

Matthew (Olson) Castle
- Also known as: Shirtless Violinist, Matthew Olshefski, Matthew Olson
- Born: January 2, 1984 (age 42); Santa Fe, New Mexico
- Occupation: Musician
- Instrument: Violin
- Years active: 2016–present
- Spouse: Paul Castle (artist) (m. 2019)
- Website: paulcastlestudio.com/pages/matthew/

Matthew Castle (né Olson), also known as The Shirtless Violinist and Matthew Olshefski, is an American YouTuber and musician from the Seattle area commonly known as "The Shirtless Violinist".

Matthew Castle began playing the violin at age three and has since become a professional musician and teacher. Castle began performing shirtless while on a vacation trip down the Pacific Coast, when his boyfriend used an iPhone to video him playing the violin outdoors overlooking the ocean.

Castle's music often incorporates LGBTQ elements.

== Early life ==
Matthew Castle started playing the violin at 3 years old. He grew up in the Midwestern United States, mostly in Kansas City, Missouri. His two siblings, a younger brother and sister, were also professionally trained violinists. They formed a trio called "Two Hits and Miss". They played nationwide with the support of their parents and music teachers. Olshefski was a former concertmaster of the Kansas City Ballet Orchestra. He resides in the Seattle area since 2001, where he does studio work for film and video game soundtracks.

When Castle was 10 years old, his parents joined the Institute in Basic Life Principles, a Christian organization run by the controversial Bill Gothard. The organization controlled many aspects of Castles's life but encouraged him to continue violin playing. Castle was offered a scholarship to the Juilliard School at 14, but his parents refused to let him attend as they were wary of outside influences Gothard deemed untrustworthy. Later, Castle ran away from home and began living on his own.

== Musical performance ==
Castle has accompanied Josh Groban and Andrea Bocelli during Seattle performances. In addition to being a solo performer, he has also been a Concert Master.

Since 2016, Castle has produced music videos, covering music such as "Over the Rainbow," the theme from Stranger Things, the theme from Game of Thrones, and "Never Enough" from The Greatest Showman.

In September 2016, Castle organized a charity challenge. At the end of a video, he encouraged viewers to post a picture of themselves giving to a local charity on social media for a chance to be featured in an upcoming music video.

Castle's music sometimes includes gay themes, such as his music video based on the Disney movie The Little Mermaid. Other examples include music from Star Wars, Cinderella, and Moana. In 2018, Castle performed a duet with gay singer-songwriter Tom Goss of Ed Sheeran's song "Perfect".

== Personal life ==
Castle began dating artist Paul Castle in 2016; they married on December 15, 2019. The couple now have a YouTube channel sharing their experiences, often focusing on Paul's disability.
