= Soundless Wind Chime =

2009 Hong Kong film by Hung Wing Kit

- Film poster
- Directed by: Hung Wing Kit
- Written by: Hung Wing Kit
- Produced by: Jacqueline Liu; Liliane Ott; Min Li Marti; Philip Delaquis; Stefan Zuber
- Starring: Bernhard Bulling; Lu Yulai; Wella Zhang; Li Wai Foon; Marie Omlin; Hannes Lindenblatt; Wong Siu Yin
- Cinematography: Yue Shi; Alex Shi Yue
- Edited by: Martina Ziesack
- Distributed by: TLA Releasing
- Release date: 9 February 2009 (Berlinale)
- Running time: 100 minutes
- Countries: Hong Kong; Switzerland; China
- Languages: Swiss German; English; Mandarin; Cantonese

Soundless Wind Chime (Chinese: 無聲風鈴; pinyin: Wúshēng fēng líng) is a 2009 independent film directed by Hung Wing Kit (Chinese: 洪榮杰), starring Lu Yu Lai and Bernhard Bulling. It was a 2009 nominee for the Berlin International Film Festival's Teddy Award.

== Plot ==
Soundless Wind Chime centers around a new immigrant to Hong Kong from China, Ricky (Lu Yu Lai), who works as a delivery boy while living with his prostitute aunt (Wella Zhang). He is pickpocketed by a Swiss thief, Pascal (Bernhard Bulling) who is in an abusive relationship with his con artist boyfriend (Hannes Lindenblatt). Deciding to leave him, Pascal has a chance encounter with Ricky and the two begin a romantic relationship. The couple struggles through good times and bad, forcing them to determine if their relationship is based on love or dependence on one another. Several years later, Ricky searches Switzerland for signs of Pascal, eventually encountering Ueli (also played by Bulling), a timid antique store owner who looks the same as Pascal, but who has a vastly different personality. As Ricky and Ueli's relationship deepens, the truth of Pascal and Ricky's relationship is unraveled as the film progresses through glimpses of the present and the past.

== Cast ==
- Lu Yu Lai – Ricky
- Bernhard Bulling – Pascal/Ueli
- Marie Omlin – Sister
- Gilles Tschudi – Father
- Ruth Schwegler – Mother
- Wella Zhang – Auntie
- Li Wai Foon – Restaurant Owner
- Wong Siu Yin – Popo
- Hannes Lindenblatt – Marcus
- Jackie Leung – Singing Angel

== Critical reception ==
Betty Jojo from The Guardian called it "a beautiful and accomplished film", while CinemaQueer noted: "Soundless Wind Chime is a film that requires a bit of work from its audience. Some viewers will be intrigued, others will be irritated. If you're willing to go with the flow, it's a rewarding movie." Albert Nowicki of Movies Room ranked it among the fifteen best overlooked 21st century indie films.

== Accolades ==
In the Turin GLBT international Film Festival, Italy, the film has won the Audience Award, Nuovi sguardi (Best New Director), and a Special Jury Mention for Best Feature Film in Competition.

The film has also won the Best Direction, and Best Actor (Lu Yulai) awards in the – Madrid International Gay & Lesbian Film Festival 2009.

In Canada, Soundless Wind Chime has won the best international feature in the Vancouver Queer Film Festival, and the Jury Award For Best Feature Film in the Image+Nation Festival Cinema LGBT Montreal.

The film was featured in the 59th Annual Berlin International Film Festival and was an official nominee for the 2009 "Teddy Award."

== Music ==
The film features an original score produced by Claudio Puntin and Insa Rudolph performed by Sepiasonic and also contains music by artist Justin McGrath as well as the song "Achoo Cha Cha" by classic Chinese singer and actress Grace Chang.

== See also ==
- Speechless, a 2012 gay-themed film with a similar atmosphere, and which also features, as its main theme, an affair between two young men, one Chinese and the other, Western. Unlike Soundless Wind Chime, the film's dialogue is mostly in Mandarin (Putonghua), the national language of China.
- List of Chinese films of 2009
- List of lesbian, gay, bisexual or transgender-related films
- List of lesbian, gay, bisexual, or transgender-related films by storyline
