= Max Emerson =

American actor, model, author, and filmmaker

- Born: Max Hanley Emerson; September 7, 1988 (age 38); Vero Beach, Florida, U.S.
- Other name: Maxisms (online)
- Education: University of Miami (BFA)
- Occupations: Writer, director, actor, influencer
- Website: www.maxismsmedia.com

Max Emerson (born September 7, 1988) is an American flimmaker, writer, actor and influencer. He wrote/directed feature films Hooked (narrative, 2017) and Invisible Lifelines: Courage where Queerness is Criminalized (documentary, 2027) and authored novels Hot Sissy- Life Before Flashbulbs and The Sparkle Club. He began his career as a model and developed a large online following, particularly on Instagram.

== Early life and education ==
Emerson was born in Vero Beach, Florida and studied for a BFA in performance and directing at the University of Miami, from which he graduated in 2009.

== Career ==
=== Modeling ===
Emerson began modeling while he was a student, when he signed up with the agency Wilhelmina Models. He works with agencies including Wilhelmina (New York), LA Models, Established Models (London), Heffner Management (Seattle), Next Management (Miami) and Factor Chosen (Chicago).

=== Filmmaking ===
He wrote, produced, co-directed and acted in two short films, DipSpit and Earwig, which were shown for the first time at the Miami Gay and Lesbian Film Festival on April 26, 2011. Earwig is a drama about a closeted gay college student, while DipSpit is a comedy about two straight male models who get kicked out and move in with a gay college student.

In October 2015, Emerson announced his intention to produce an independent film called Hooked for which he had written the story, telling the story of a homeless gay prostitute called Jack and addressing the problems faced by homeless LGBT youth. He aimed to raise $150,000 for the project via Indiegogo and give half of any profits made to charities benefiting LGBT people. The launch video for the Indiegogo campaign featured Todrick Hall and musician Tom Goss. As part of it, he released a single with Goss called "Not Enough". The campaign was supported by Out magazine.

Hooked had its world premiere at NewFest: The New York LGBT Film Festival on June 26, 2017, and its European premiere at the 7th Homochron film festival in Cologne on October 20 the same year. The Los Angeles Times gave it a negative review.

Max's newest film premiers in 2027. Invisible Lifelines: "Courage where Queerness is Criminalized" follows LGTBQ heroes serving in countries where queer identities are dangerous, even deadly.

=== Acting ===
As well as acting in Earwig and DipSpit, Emerson has appeared in single episodes of the TV series Glee (the season 5 finale "The Untitled Rachel Berry Project"), Hit the Floor, The Real O'Neals and Eastsiders, and of the web series Coffee House Chronicles and the movie made from it.

From September 7 to 24, 2017, he starred as Mitchell in Douglas Carter Beane's comedy play The Little Dog Laughed at the Red House Arts Center in Syracuse, New York. A local reviewer said each of the four actors in the play "brings a memorable, engaging performance", and that Emerson "delivers the role of a sweet, confused, and occasionally thoughtless young star with sensitivity and kindness".

=== Writing ===
Emerson's first novel, Hot Sissy – Life Before Flashbulbs, is autobiographical. It follows his teenage years growing up in "redneck" Florida. Hot Sissy was released as an e-book and in a limited print run of 500 hardcover copies in December 2014. The limited editions were each signed and came with an original Polaroid picture.

His second novel, The Sparkle Club, follows a gay baiting influencer and social justice warrior. He get himself cancelled so hard that he's forced into a summer of community service in rural Ohio... while living with the family whose lives he destroyed.

Both e-books are free for students through Max's website.

== Personal life ==
In June 2016, he publicly introduced his boyfriend, Andrés Camilo, an officer in the US Army, in a YouTube video. Emerson has an active social media presence and posts regularly on YouTube where his username is "TheMaxVicious". As of December 2018, he has 1 million followers on Instagram and 19,500 on Twitter. On YouTube and on social media, Emerson is known for his humour and for showing off his body.

In May 2017, French comic TV presenter Cyril Hanouna used one of Emerson's torso pictures to set up a catfishing profile on a gay dating site, and tricked the men who responded to the profile into revealing sexual fantasies to him while he was live on his show Touche pas à mon poste !. The segment triggered nearly 20,000 complaints to regulators and condemnation from LGBT groups.

In April 2022, Emerson served as the Grand Marshal of the Miami Beach Gay Pride.

In July 2023, Emerson and Camilo announced their engagement on Instagram. In January 2025, however, the two had announced that they had ended their relationship after 9 years.

== Filmography ==
Year	Title	Type	Role	Notes	Ref(s)
2010	Violet Tendencies	Movie	Max	Self	
2011	Earwig	Short	Max	Writer, producer, co-director	
2011	DipSpit	Short	Sam	Writer, producer, co-director	
2014	Glee	TV series	Male model	Episode: The Untitled Rachel Berry Project	
2014	"DTF" by Adore Delano	Music video	Max	Self	
2015	Coffee House Chronicles	Web series	Jonathan	Episode: Seeking Same	
2015	Futbol	Movie	Muffin Troll	Actor	
2016	Hit the Floor	TV series	Max	Episode: Good D	
2016	The Real O'Neals	TV series	Cologne Man	Episode: Pilot	
2016	Coffee House Chronicles: The Movie	Movie	Jonathan	Actor	
2017	Me + 1	Short	Matthew Newman	Actor	
2017	EastSiders	TV series	Cheyenne	Episode: Priscilla	
2017	Hooked	Movie		Writer, director, executive producer	
2018	"Now or never" by Blair St. Clair	Music video	Max	Self	
2019	Psycho Stripper	Movie	Benji	Actor	
2021	Single All the Way	Film	Maxisms		
