= Paul Castle (artist) =

Social media personality

- Born: 1990 or 1991 (age 35–36); Vancouver, British Columbia, Canada
- Spouse: Matthew Castle (m. 2019)

YouTube information
- Channel: MatthewandPaulOfficial
- Subscribers: 1.43 million
- Views: 858 million
- Last updated: 6 February 2025
- Website: paulcastlestudio.com

Paul Castle is a Canadian social media personality, activist, and visual artist living in Seattle. Castle has retinitis pigmentosa, which causes gradual vision loss, and is legally blind.

== Social media presence ==
On TikTok and YouTube, Castle shares videos about his life, often discussing his experiences as with retinitis pigmentosa and his guide dog, Mr. Maple. Many of his videos also include his husband, Matthew, playing pranks on him.

== Writing ==
In 2022, Castle self-published his debut book, Pringle & Finn, a children's picture book about two male penguins getting married. The book is inspired by Castle's own wedding and the illustrations on his wedding invitations. The book's main characters returned in his 2023 book, The Secret Ingredient, which shares the penguins' story of becoming parents. Due to the books' inclusion of gay characters, Castle has stated they have been subjected to book bans. While many on social media increased their support of Castle after hearing about the bans, some questioned whether the books had been banned due to their inclusion of gay characters or if they had been rejected from bookstores because they are self-published. In 2024, he self-published the children's picture book Adoroscopes, about horoscopes.

== Personal life ==
Castle was born and raised in the Vancouver area, but as of 2022, lived in Seattle. He began experiencing vision loss at age 10, and was diagnosed with retinitis pigmentosa at age 16. He studied English literature at San Jose State University.

Matthew and Paul Castle began dating in 2016 and married on December 15, 2019. Matthew Castle is an American classical violinist.

== Publications ==
- Pringle & Finn. Paul Castle Studio. 2022.
- The Secret Ingredient. Paul Castle Studio. 2023.
- Adoroscopes. Paul Castle Studio. 2024.
- How to Raise a Baby Penguin. Paul Castle Studio. 2025.
- Mr. Maple: A Guide Dog's Journey. Paul Castle Studio. 2025.
