= Tom Goss (musician) =

American singer-songwriter and actor (born 1981)

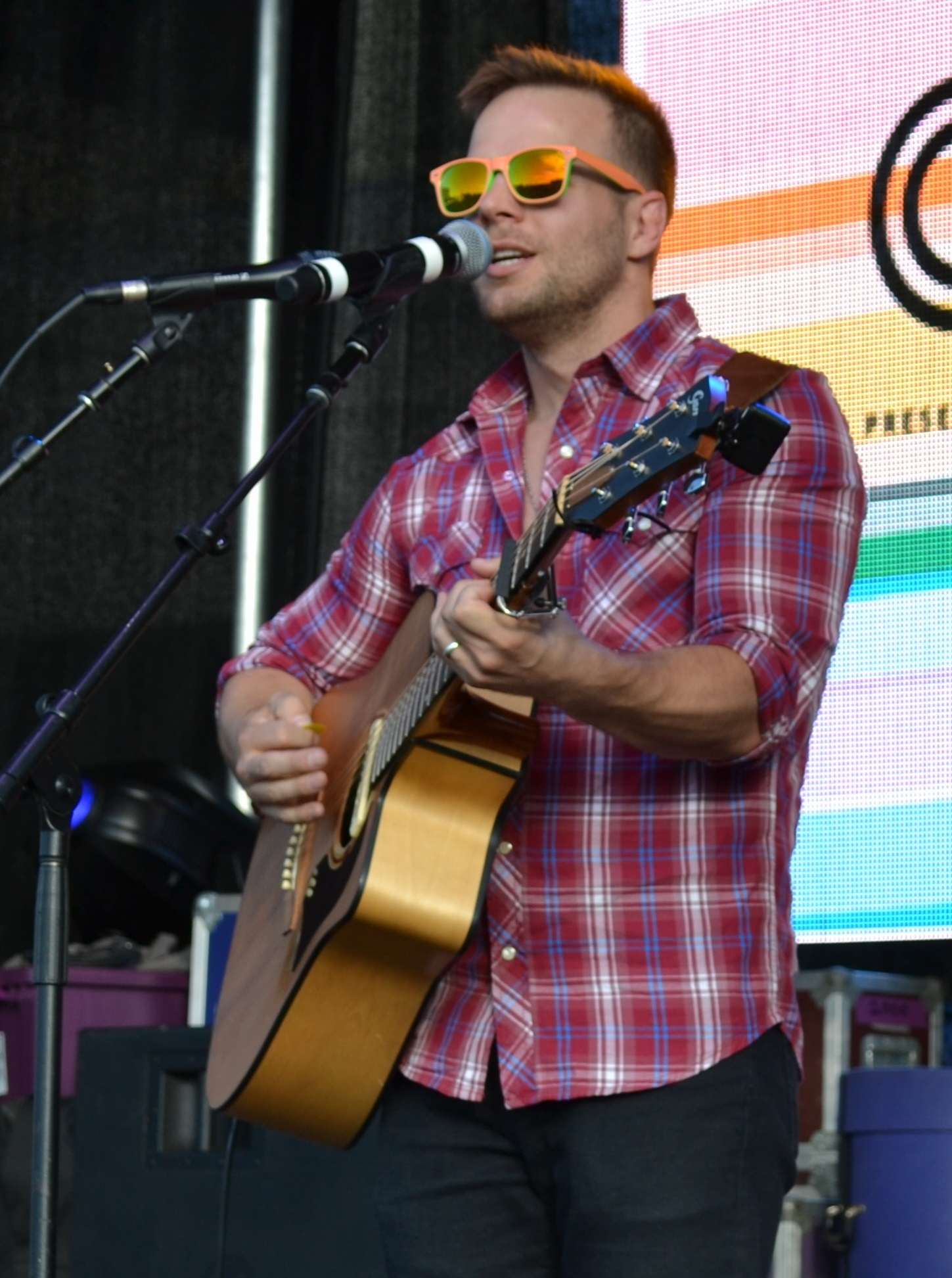
- Goss performing in 2014

Background information
- Also known as: Justin Jaymes
- Born: Thomas Patrick Goss; April 30, 1981 (age 45); Quincy, Illinois, US
- Genres: Power pop; blue-eyed soul; Pop rock; folk rock
- Occupations: Musician; Actor
- Instruments: Vocals; guitar; keyboards
- Years active: 2005–present
- Label: independent
- Website: tomgossmusic.com

Thomas Patrick Goss (born April 30, 1981) is an American singer-songwriter and actor. Goss has self-released five studio albums, one live album, two EPs, and multiple non-album singles. He has seen commercial success with his music featured on MTV's Logo TV. He won Best Gay Musician in DC from The Washington Blade, both in 2011 and 2012. Many of Goss' songs and music videos ("Lover", "Bears" and "Make Believe") speak to LGBT issues such as marriage equality, Don't ask, don't tell (DADT), and gay subcultures such as bears. Goss tours internationally, often playing at LGBT establishments. In 2014, Goss landed his first starring role in a feature film—the gay-themed Out to Kill.

== Personal life ==
Goss was born in Quincy, Illinois, and raised in Kenosha, Wisconsin. He graduated from the University of Central Missouri before moving to Washington, DC to attend a Roman Catholic seminary. Shortly after entry, he decided to take a different path and pursued work in the nonprofit industry, working at Charlie's Place as a Program Manager in Washington DC. He also pursued his music, performing in local coffeehouses. During this time, he came out of the closet and soon after met his husband, Mike Briggs, whom he married in October 2010. In 2012, Goss produced a music video for his song "You Know That I Love You" off his 2011 album, which documented his marriage ceremony.

== Music career ==
=== 2006–2008 Early career, "Rise" ===
Goss started his career as a singer-songwriter in Washington, DC coffeehouses in the early 2000s. In 2006, Goss released his first album, Naked Without.

In 2008, Goss released his first EP, Rise. The title song from the EP hit No. 2 on Logo TV's Click List that summer.

=== 2009–2010 "Till The End" ===
In 2009, Goss released his second full album, Back to Love, complete with 11 original songs. On this album, Goss explored romantic love, spirituality and morality. The first single/video, "Till the End", went all the way to No. 1 on Logo TV's Click List. The album also features one of his most popular singles, "Lover". The accompanying video tells the story of an American soldier killed in Afghanistan while his husband waits at home. It stars servicemen who were discharged specifically under the Don't Ask, Don't Tell policy. "Lover" was put into heavy rotation on MTV's Logo TV, and garnered over 100,000 hits on YouTube and over 1.5 million hits on Youku. Back to Love received critical acclaim, with OnTap Magazine hailing it a "heartfelt winner." His newfound success propelled him into his first nationwide tour.

In 2010, Goss released a double EP called Politics of Love which combined the newly produced songs as well as songs from his 2008 EP, Rise. The newly produced songs carried a political opinion about LGBT rights and complimented Goss' political project of the same name, which provided assistance for those looking to start conversations about marriage equality and equal rights in their communities.

Goss then released his first live album, Live at Terry's. He finished out the year with his first Christmas-themed single "Christmas, Chicago Time".

=== 2011–2012 "Make Believe", first music awards ===
In 2011, Goss released his third full album, Turn It Around, which was produced by Mike Ofca at Innovation Studios complete with 11 original songs. The album launched another national tour. Goss produced a music video for a song of this album called "Make Believe". The video received over 100,000 hits, and garnered attention from the media such as Huffington Post for its use of time-lapse photography. The video and album helped him receive Best Gay Musician of the Year by The Washington Blade in 2011.

In 2012, Goss released his fourth full album, Love Songs and Underdogs, complete with 10 original songs. The songs on the album were all written and recorded in a one-room cabin in rural Virginia cut off from everything but his computer, keyboard, guitars and microphones. In a 2013 interview, Goss reflected on this experience: "...I think I had to think a lot about why am I creating music and what is it about being an artist and why we create art. And I think I came back and had to do something completely on my own to re-establish and have the confidence to believe in my artistic worth. And that was "Love Songs and Underdogs." For this album, Goss toured 50 cities in America. His success led him to repeat his award by The Washington Blade for Best Gay Musician of the Year.

Goss rounded out the year with his second Christmas-themed song "Santa, Imma Make You Dance".

=== 2013 "Bears", broader international success ===
Early in 2013, Goss produced a video of himself performing a cover version of Macklemore and Ryan Lewis' No. 1 song "Can't Hold Us". It is his second most popular video on YouTube to date, with over 200,000 hits. Goss then released his single, "Bears", along with an accompanying music video. He teamed up with producer Richard Morel of Blowoff, Deathfix, and Hot Sauce to craft a pop/rock anthem. He worked with Aram Vartian and Michael Patrick Key to direct the music video. Together, the video (his most popular to date) and song received over half million YouTube hits and downloads worldwide, as well as press from media outlets like Queerty.com, The Washington Post Express, and Sirius Radio. The single addressed Goss' affinity toward Bears, a subset of the gay male culture that describes large, burly, often hairy men. Subsequently, Goss has been invited to Bear festivals around the world, most notably Bear Week in Provincetown, Massachusetts. and the Great British Bear Bash in Manchester, UK. In September 2014, the video played in the DC Shorts Film Festival. In support of "Bears", Goss toured internationally in the US and Europe.

Goss' further released a Liz DeRoche remix of his song "I Do". This was followed by "Waiting For Your Call", a duet with long-time friend Joey Salinas. In an interview with queermusicheritage.com, Goss said "You know, it's interesting, I think that 2013, or the end of 2012–2013 has been about doing things that I wanted to do, and not really thinking as much about how people are going to perceive it. And I think that's been really freeing. So Joey and I had talked for years about doing a song together, and finally I said, well, I don't know why we're still talking, let's just set up a studio time."

=== 2014 Contributions to the soundtrack Out to Kill, "Illuminate the Dark" ===
In 2014, Goss contributed three songs to soundtrack of the gay-themed murder mystery Out to Kill. Most notable was "You Don't Know How Hard", performed by Goss' character in the movie "Justin Jaymes". The dance/electro song was a big departure from Goss' previous acoustic work. The song and video are an ironic contrast to Goss' "Bears", which focuses on size inclusivity and bears the line "bears don't discriminate". The video stands out with its multi-racial cast.

Goss then released his fifth album, Wait. It was produced by Mike Ofca (Neverwake, Righteous B, Joe Zelek) and mastered by Randy LeRoy (Tim McGraw, Jack Johnson, John Prine, Relient K, Chris Thile). The album was his first production to collaborate with his band, including drummer Liz DeRoche (The Pushovers/Cane and the Sticks), who had remixed "I Do" the year before, vocalist Sarah Gilberg (Luray), Don Harvey and Gary Prince. He also collaborated with singer-songwriter, and long-time friend, Matt Alber. The first single off of Wait was "Illuminate The Dark". The accompanying video features wounded war vet turned model, Alex Minsky. The video was deemed 'incredible' by the Huffington Post.

Edgemedianetwork.com spoke highly of the album: "Goss has always had a strong lyric talent, describing feelings and situations in his songs that stand up as short stories in their own right. That's true here, as well, with the singer ruminating on love, life, God, and his own human limitations. The songs stretch across the emotional spectrum, from cheeky to rueful to tender; this is probably Goss' best album so far, and to hear him tell it, he's having the time of his life."

=== 2015 – 2016 Los Angeles, Breakout Videos and What Doesn't Break ===
In 2015, Goss moved to Los Angeles and began focusing more of his energy on producing new, dynamic and groundbreaking music videos. Crowdfunded with the help of Kickstarter, Goss produced and released Breath and Sound and Son of a Preacher Man. Both videos received critical acclaim. New Now Next called Breath and Sound 'Dazzling,' while The Daily Beast called Son of a Preacher Man "Moving and Beautifully Composed," and The Huffington Post called it "A powerful, somber take on a Dusti Springfield classic."

In August 2016 Goss released his 7th studio album What Doesn't Break. Produced by Marr Zimm, the album was recorded in Los Angeles and between cities while Zimm was on tour with Ringling Bros. and Barnum & Bailey Circus.

Edgemedianetwork.com spoke highly of the album: "The ten tracks on Tom Goss' new album "What Doesn't Break" have a richer and more complex sound, while still being recognizably Goss in style—though in some cases, the new songs take darker lyrical turns, coupled with equally dark (though compelling) musical ideas. Working with producer Marr Zimm, Goss has crafted a collection that's consistently mature and refined, both musically and conceptually."

=== 2017 – 2018 ===
In 2017, Goss released a series of popular songs: More Than Temporary, All My Life, Click an interactive piece, and Gay Christmas. Goss also did an EP (extended play) recording with the band "Suitable Victims" called "Broken Pieces" and another under the moniker of 'The Alliance' called "There For You".

In 2018, Goss performed a duet with Matthew Olshefski "The Shirtless Violinist" of Ed Sheeran's song "Perfect".

== Acting career ==
In 2014, Goss starred in his first feature film Out to Kill. The movie has a "whodunit" murder plot, where Goss' character "Justin Jaymes" is killed and a private investigator is hired to dig up who did it and why. Out to Kill was directed and written by independent filmmaker Rob Williams (Long Term relationship, The Men from Next Door), who has made a name for himself in the gay genre. The movie is distributed by Guest House Films.

Out to Kill has been shown at the Tampa International Gay & Lesbian Film Festival, qFLIXphiladelphia, the Kansas City LGBT Film Festival, and the North Carolina Gay & Lesbian Film Festival. It won First Prize, Alternative Spirit Award (LGBTQ) Feature, at the Rhode Island International Film Festival. It has also toured internationally at the Korea Queer Film Festival and the KASHISH Mumbai International Queer Film Festival.

In 2016, an Indiegogo campaign was launched to help raise $35,000 to fund a gay themed romantic comedy movie entitled "Please Don't Eat the Pansies". The cast included actor/writer Ronnie Kerr, Mary Wilson of The Supremes, Andrew Lauer and Tom.

== Discography ==
=== Albums ===
- Naked Without (2006)
- Back to Love (2009)
- Live at Terry's (2010)
- Turn It Around (2011)
- Lost Songs and Underdogs (2012)
- Wait (2014)
- What Doesn't Break (2016)
- Territories (2019)
- Remember What It Feels Like (2023)

=== EPs ===
- Rise (2008)
- Politics of Love (2010) (Double EP)
- Wait (The Remixes) (2015)
- Click (2017)

=== Singles / Videography ===
- "Rise" (2008)
- "Till The End" (2009)
- "You Don't Question Love" (2010)
- "Who We Are" (with Matt Alber) (2010)
- "Lover" (2010)
- "Christmas, Chicago Time" (2010)
- "It's All Over" (2011)
- "You Know That I Love You" (2012)
- "Santa, Imma Make You Dance" (2012)
- "Make Believe" (2012)
- "Bears" (2013)
- "I Do (Remix)" (2013)
- "Waiting For Your Call" (with Joey Salinas) (2013)
- "You Don't Know How Hard" (as Justin Jaymes) (2014)
- "All About That Bass" (with MDQ) (2014)
- "Wait" (2014)
- "Illuminate The Dark" (2014)
- "Festivus" (with Amber Ojeda) (2014)
- "I Don't Mind" (feat. Max Emerson) (2015)
- "Not Enough" (with Max Emerson) (2015)
- "Breath and Sound" (feat. Matt Alber) (2015)
- "Headlights" (2015)
- "What We've Found" (2015)
- "Son of a Preacher Man" (2016)
- "Enoch (From 'Confessions')" (2016)
- "All My Life" (2016)
- "More Than Temporary" (2017)
- "Click" (2017)
- "Have We Had Enough" (2017)
- "Gay Christmas" (2017)
- "Round In All the Right Places" (2018)
- "Still I Want You" (2018)
- "Wake Alive" (2018)
- "A Mother's Love" (2018)
- "Three of a Kind" (with Deven Green & Ned Douglas)(2019)
- "Quayside" (2019)
- "La Bufadora" (2019) (feat. Daniel Franzese)
- "Berlin" (2019)
- "Québec" (feat. Daniel Franzese) (2020)
- "Dancing in My Room" (2020) (feat. Natalie Jane, Sam Renascent, & Max Emerson)
- "Regretting" (2020) (feat. Daniel Franzese)
- "Nerdy Bear" (2020)
- "Amsterdam" (feat. Nakia) (2020)
- "Christmas 2020" (2020)
- "Cooler Near The Lake" (2021)
- "Nerdy Bear" (Markaholic Remix) (2021)
- "Pride" (2021)
- "Undercover Summer" (with Deven Green & Ned Douglas) (2021)
- "Everything" (2021)
- "Best Life" (feat. Steve Solomon) (2021)

== Filmography ==
- Out to Kill as Justin Jaymes
- Confessions as The Singer

Soundtracks

- "Rise" on film Three Day Weekend (2008)
- "Lover" on film Role/Play (2010)
- "You Don't Know How Hard" on film Out to Kill (2014) (plus 2 other tracks)
- "Enoch" on film Confessions (2016)
- Full score on Hooked (2017)

== Awards ==
Organization	Award	Result
Cannes Short Film Festival	Best LGBT Short (Reshaping Beauty)	Official Selection
Los Angeles Film Awards	Best LGBT Film (Reshaping Beauty)	Winner
Louisiana LGBT Festival	Best Short (Reshaping Beauty)	Semi-finalist
Audio Shoot International Music Video & Film Festival	Best Music Documentary (Reshaping Beauty)	Winner
The Washington Blade	Best Gay Musician 2011	Winner
The Washington Blade	Best Gay Musician 2012	Winner
Pride in the Arts	Favorite Male Musician	Winner
Radio Crystal Blue	Album of the Year	Winner
