= Make the Yuletide Gay =

2009 film by Rob Williams

- Theatrical poster
- Directed by: Rob Williams
- Written by: Rob Williams
- Produced by: Rodney Johnson; Matthew Montgomery; Rob Williams
- Starring: Keith Jordan; Adamo Ruggiero; Hallee Hirsh; Kelly Keaton; Derek Long; Alison Arngrim; Ian Buchanan; Gates McFadden
- Cinematography: Ian McGlocklin
- Edited by: Denise Howard
- Music by: Austin Wintory
- Production company: Guest House Films
- Distributed by: TLA Releasing
- Release date: May 17, 2009 (Canada)
- Running time: 89 minutes
- Country: United States
- Language: English

Make the Yuletide Gay is a 2009 American Christmas romantic comedy film written and directed by Rob Williams about a gay college student who is out at school, but is afraid to reveal his sexual orientation to his parents. It stars Keith Jordan as Gunn, and Adamo Ruggiero as Gunn's boyfriend and roommate, Nathan. Kelly Keaton and Derek Long star as Anya and Sven, Gunn's parents, while Hallee Hirsh appears as Abby, Gunn's high school girlfriend.

Make the Yuletide Gay premiered at the Inside Out Toronto LGBT Film and Video Festival on May 17, 2009.

The title of the film comes from a line in the 1944 song Have Yourself a Merry Little Christmas, written by Hugh Martin and Ralph Blane.

== Cast ==
- Keith Jordan as Olaf "Gunn" Gunnunderson: a college student who is openly gay at school. Back at home, his parents, neighbors, and high school friends think that he is straight. Gunn is afraid that his parents will stop loving him if they find out that he is gay. When he goes home for Christmas, he has to change the way he dresses and his personal mannerisms in order to maintain his heterosexual façade.
- Adamo Ruggiero as Nathan Stanford: an openly gay college student from a wealthy family on the Upper East Side, is Gunn's boyfriend and dorm roommate. Unlike Gunn, Nathan is completely open about his sexuality, including with his parents.
- Hallee Hirsh as Abby Mancuso: who lives across the street from Gunn, and they had a brief romantic relationship while they were in high school.
- Kelly Keaton as Anya Gunnunderson: Gunn's jovial, happy-go-lucky mother. She grew up in Wisconsin and is a housewife.
- Derek Long as Sven Gunnunderson: Gunn's forgetful, pot-smoking father. He grew up in Minnesota and is a professor at the local college.
- Alison Arngrim as Heather Mancuso: Abby's mother. Heather and Anya pretend to be friends, but they secretly despise each other.
- Ian Buchanan as Peter Stanford and Gates McFadden as Martha Stanford: Nathan's wealthy, emotionally detached parents. They decide to go on a cruise, leaving Nathan all alone for Christmas.

== Awards ==
Year	Festival	Award	Category
2009	FilmOut San Diego	Audience Award	Best Narrative Feature; Best Supporting Actress, Kelly Keaton; Best Supporting Actor, Derek Long
2009	Seoul LGBT Film Festival	Audience Award	Best Feature
2009	Long Island Gay & Lesbian Film Festival	Jury Award	Best Men's Feature
2009	North Carolina Gay & Lesbian Film Festival	Men's Centerpiece Selection	
2009	Philadelphia QFest	Festival Favorite	
2009	Tampa International Gay and Lesbian Film Festival	Gala Night Film	

== Home media release ==
Make the Yuletide Gay was released on DVD on November 10, 2009.

== Book and sequel ==
In 2017, Rob Williams published the book based on the film, Make The Yuletide Gay: The Novel, ISBN 978-1548715595. The novel reveals more about the Gunnunderson, Stanford and Mancuso families, and about Gunn’s journey over that fateful holiday week, and what happens afterwards. Included in this book is a new short story When Olaf Met Nathan, which details the first meeting between the two college freshmen, randomly assigned as roommates but destined to become much more.

In 2018, he released a (not yet filmed) sequel Make The Yuletide Gay 2: The Novel, ISBN 978-1987529661. The story is set years after the fateful Christmas dinner when Gunn came out to his parents. Gunn and Nathan have maintained a long-term, long-distance relationship due to Nathan's career choices and Gunn's graduate education. They now live in the same city and teach at the same college where Gunn's father Sven works. Gunn and Nathan plan a Christmas wedding, which does not go entirely as planned.

== See also ==
- List of lesbian, gay, bisexual, or transgender-related films by storyline
