= Speechless (2012 film) =

2012 Hong Kong-Chinese film by Simon Chung

- Film poster
- Directed by: Simon Chung
- Written by: Lu Yulai; Simon Chung
- Produced by: Simon Chung
- Starring: Pierre-Matthieu Vital; Qilun Gao; Yung Yung Yu; Jian Jiang; Yu Ting Si Tu; Shu Ling Lang; Shao Qiu Shen; Hua Li
- Cinematography: Chan Chi Lap
- Edited by: Roddy Law
- Music by: Sebastian Seidel
- Production company: Heart Production Company
- Distributed by: Panorama (Hong Kong); TLA Releasing (UK); PRO-FUN media Filmverleih (Germany); Breaking Glass Pictures (USA)
- Release date: 28 March 2012 (BFI)
- Running time: 92 minutes
- Countries: Hong Kong; China
- Languages: Mandarin; English

Speechless (Chinese: 無言; pinyin: Wu yan) is a 2012 drama film directed by Simon Chung, about a mute Frenchman who is found naked by the banks of a river in Wuhan in mainland China. He is rescued and sent to a local hospital where he is treated by a nurse who cares for him and later discovers the secrets of his past.

A Hong Kong-Chinese co-production, Speechless is the third feature film by director Simon Chung. His previous films were Innocent, released in 2005, and End of Love, in 2009.

The film premiered at the BFI 26th London Lesbian and Gay Film Festival, on 28 March 2012, and contains brief full-frontal male nudity.

== Plot ==
A man is found naked by the side of a river in Wuhan in mainland China. His name is Luke, but he appears to be unable to speak, and is sent to a local hospital for diagnosis. Unable to determine the cause of Luke's condition, the hospital decides that he must be sent elsewhere. Soon, Luke's nurse, Xiao Jiang, discovers that his superiors have decided to transfer Luke to a mental asylum. He then decides that he must rescue him and smuggle him out to his uncle's village, where they will have to evade capture from the local police.

Slowly, the reason for Luke's speechlessness becomes clear. Xiao Jiang discovers that Luke had previously had a romantic affair with a young male university student, called Han Dong, whom he had met at the university campus, together with Han Dong's girlfriend, Xiao Ning. Xiao Jiang accidentally discovers a secret that provides a key to Luke's past, enabling him to subsequently track down Xiao Ning to find out more. Although she proves to be unhelpful and deceitful, he begins to be able to piece together the mystery of Luke's inability to speak. He learns that Luke's romantic relationship with Han Dong had been discovered by Xiao Ning, who is a devout Christian, and had decided to punish her boyfriend by 'outing' him and publicly humiliating him at church. During Xiao Jiang's unravelling of this mystery, Luke suddenly disappears from the accommodation he had secretly shared with Xiao Jiang. As a result, Xiao Jiang asks for the help of a female friend, Lan, to try to locate Luke, and help resolve once and for all the central mystery of Luke's inability to speak.

== Production ==
Speechless was filmed in secret in mainland China: in the small city of Shantou, on the East coast of Guangdong Province, and in the northern countryside of Guangdong, in Southern China. The university campus scene, introducing one of the film's most important characters, Han Dong, and his girlfriend, Xiao Ning, was filmed at Shantou University.

The man playing the role of Han Dong is mainland China model, actor and magician Jian Jiang, who is from Guangzhou, while the woman playing his girlfriend, Xiao Ning, is Indonesian-born and Australian-educated actress Yung Yung Yu. Both of the main actors, Pierre-Matthieu Vital and Qilun Gao, are indirect friends of the film's director, Simon Chung. Vital, who plays Luke, is from France, but lives and works in Guangzhou and regularly visits Hong Kong, where he first met Simon Chung. Vital is not a fluent speaker of Mandarin Chinese, and so Chung had to help train him to speak his lines. The actor playing Vital's attentive nurse, Xiao Jiang, is Beijing actor Qilun Gao, who had previously appeared in another Hong Kong film.

As filming in China was unofficial, the film was unable to secure a theatrical release in its country of production, although it has been screened once in China, to students at Shantou University, and released in cinemas across Hong Kong. Chung says he wanted his film to explore both a Western perspective of China as well as a Chinese perspective of the West.

The inspiration for the film came from a real-life case known as the "Piano Man," in which a man washed up off the eastern coast of England several years ago.

== Cast ==
- Pierre-Matthieu Vital ... Luke
- Qilun Gao ... Xiao Jiang
- Jian Jiang ... Han Dong
- Yung Yung Yu ... Xiao Ning
- Yu Ting Si Tu ... Lan
- Shu Ling Lang ... Xiao Jiang's mother
- Shao Qiu Shen ... Dr. Lin
- Hua Li ... Church's caretaker

== See also ==
- Soundless Wind Chime, a 2009 gay-themed film with a similar atmosphere, and which also features, as its main theme, an affair between two young men, one Chinese and the other Western. Unlike Speechless, the film's dialogue is mostly in the English language.
- List of Chinese films of 2012
- List of lesbian, gay, bisexual or transgender-related films
- List of lesbian, gay, bisexual, or transgender-related films by storyline
- Nudity in film (East Asian cinema since 1929)
