= Kit Hung =

Hong Kong director (born 1977)

- Born: Hung Wing Kit; Hong Kong
- Education: Hong Kong Polytechnic University; School of the Art Institute of Chicago
- Occupations: Film producer Film director
- Years active: 2000s–present
- Awards: 2009 Berlin International Film Festival; Teddy Award Nominee; Soundless Wind Chime 2009 Turin GLBT International Film Festival; Best New Director; Soundless Wind Chime 2009 Montreal International LGBT Film Fest; Best Feature Film; Soundless Wind Chime 2009 Vancouver Queer Film Festival; Best International Feature; Soundless Wind Chime 2009 LesGaiCineMad; Best Director; Soundless Wind Chime 2009 Turin GLBT International Film Festival; Audience Award; Soundless Wind Chime

Chinese name
- Traditional Chinese: 洪榮杰
Transcriptions

Kit Hung (aka Wing Kit Hung or Hung Wing Kit, Chinese: 洪榮杰; pinyin: Hóng Róngjié) is an independent filmmaker from Hong Kong. His films have won several international awards. He is most notable for his film Soundless Wind Chime (2009), which has won several awards, and was distributed in Germany, Hong Kong, North America, France and the United Kingdom.

== Education ==
Kit Hung studied film production in the United States and Hong Kong. He attended the Hong Kong Polytechnic University and the School of the Art Institute of Chicago for his BA in Design (Combined Studies), 2001 and a M.F.A. in Studio (Film, Video and New Media), 2005 respectively.

== Life and career ==
Hung's graduation film I Am Not What You Want (2001) is significant in queer culture in Hong Kong as it challenges the stereotypes of Hong Kong gay men and gives a different representations in homosexuality in Hong Kong. It was distributed both in Canada (V-Tape) and Hong Kong (Ying e Chi). Competing with other commercial feature film DVDs, this 50 minute, limited-budget, independent short film held 2nd place in the sales chart in HMV, Hong Kong for 11 weeks. It was also used as a teaching material in universities in Hong Kong for cultural studies.

Since 2001, Hung has been working in different film productions in China and Europe as an editor, continuity, assistant director and project manager. This includes Ho Yuk (Let's Love Hong Kong) directed by Yau Ching and the contract projects from Radio Television Hong Kong. He was also teaching in the School of Creative Media in the City University of Hong Kong.

He is a lecturer in the Academy of Film, Hong Kong Baptist University since 2012.

Hung joined Jiukaboom Multimedia Production Company in 2012 and is now the featured director and writer of the company.

Hung's films are supported with grants from Hong Kong, the United States, Switzerland and France. He has also directed music videos for singers including Chet Lam (Hong Kong), Eman Lam (Hong Kong), and Signorino TJ (Switzerland).

== Personal life ==
Hung is openly gay and has stated that his 2009 film, Soundless Wind Chime, is "semi-autobiographical".

== Selected filmography ==
- "In My Space of Loneliness" (1999, 5 mins, Hong Kong)
- "Invisible People" (2000, 35 mins, Hong Kong)
- I Am Not What You Want (2001, 50 mins, Hong Kong)
- "Buffering…" (2003, 38 mins, Hong Kong/Switzerland/Chicago)
- Soundless Wind Chime (2009, 100 mins, Hong Kong/Switzerland/China)
- Stoma (2020, 107 mins, Hong Kong/Switzerland)

== Selected awards and nominations ==
- Teddy Award Nominee - Soundless Wind Chime, Berlin International Film Festival (2009)
- Best New Director - Soundless Wind Chime, Turin GLBT Int’l Film Festival, Italy (2009)
- Best Feature Film - Soundless Wind Chime, Montreal Int’l LGBT Film Fest, Canada (2009)
- Special Jury Mention, Best Feature Film - Soundless Wind Chime, Turin GLBT Int’l Film Festival, Italy (2009)
- Best Int’l Feature - Soundless Wind Chime, Vancouver Queer Film Festival, Canada (2009)
- Best Director - Soundless Wind Chime, LesGaiCineMad Madrid, Spain (2009)
- Audience Award - Soundless Wind Chime, Turin GLBT Int’l Film Festival, Italy (2009)

== Other Chinese LGBT film directors ==
- Simon Chung
- Cui Zi'en
- Stanley Kwan
- Quentin Lee
- Zihan Loo
- Scud
- Yonfan

== See also ==
- Cinema of Hong Kong
