= Rob Williams (filmmaker) =

American film director

- Occupations: film director, producer and screenwriter
- Years active: 2006-present

Rob Williams is an American independent film director, producer and screenwriter. In 2005, he co-founded the independent production house Guest House Films LLC with his partner Rodney Johnson. He released his debut long feature Long-Term Relationship in 2006. In 2007, he won the Grand Prize at the Rhode Island International Film Festival for his film Back Soon.

Williams is most famous for Make the Yuletide Gay, which won Best Narrative Feature at the 2009 FilmOut San Diego film festival. It also won the Jury Award for Best Men's Feature at the 2009 Long Island Gay & Lesbian Film Festival.

== Filmography ==
=== Director / Producer / Screenwriter ===
- 2006: Long-Term Relationship
- 2007: Back Soon
- 2008: 3-Day Weekend
- 2009: Make the Yuletide Gay
- 2010: Role/Play
- 2012: The Men Next Door
- 2014: Out to Kill
- 2016: Shared Rooms
- 2017: Happiness Adjacent

=== Others ===
- 2011: Regrets (short film – screenwriter)
- 2012: Black Briefs (Video producer)
- 2012: Blue Briefs (producer)
- 2013: The Far Flung Star (actor)
