= Out to Kill =

- Theatrical poster
- Directed by: Rob Williams
- Written by: Rob Williams
- Produced by: Rodney Johnson (producer); Rob Williams (producer); Roger D. Johnson, Michael NgTang and Christopher Patrino (executive producers)
- Starring: Tom Goss; Scott Sell
- Cinematography: Paul D. Hart
- Edited by: Mike Jefferson Justice
- Music by: Jake Monaco
- Production company: Guest House Films
- Release date: July 1, 2014
- Country: United States
- Language: English

Out to Kill is a 2014 film written and directed by independent filmmaker Rob Williams, who has made a name for himself in the gay genre. It was produced by GHF Films Productions and released on Guest House Films.

== Synopsis ==
Out to Kill is a gay-themed film with a "whodunit" murder plot. Gay private investigator Jim Noble (played by Scott Sell) moves into a loft complex in Tampa, to find his first case literally right outside his door – the corpse of one of his neighbors, Justin Jaymes (played by out up-and-coming singer Tom Goss in his film debut), floating in the pool right in the middle of the complex's courtyard. When he is hired to solve the crime, Jim quickly learns that everyone in the complex has secrets, and that someone was willing to kill to keep their secrets hidden.

== Cast ==
- Tom Goss as Justin Jaymes
- Scott Sell as Jim Noble
- Rob Moretti as Gene Sherman
- Christopher Patrino as Henry Rutherford
- Mark Strano as Vic Barnaby
- Lee Williams as Steve
- Nicolas Burgos as Stephen
- Christopher Cutillo as Steven
- Jeffrey Klein as Mikal Birdwell
- Aaron Quick Nelson as Lamar
- Joey Panek as Frederico
- Michael Kenneth Fahr as Ted
- Karleigh Chase as Ann Fitzsimmons
- Mark Manning as Patrick Mason

== Screenings and awards ==
Out to Kill has been shown at the Tampa International Gay & Lesbian Film Festival, qFLIXphiladelphia, the Kansas City LGBT Film Festival, and the North Carolina Gay & Lesbian Film Festival. It won First Prize, Alternative Spirit Award (LGBTQ) Feature, at the Rhode Island International Film Festival. It has also toured internationally at the Korea Queer Film Festival and the KASHISH Mumbai International Queer Film Festival.
