= Bad Romance (film) =

- Directed by: François Chang
- Written by: François Chang
- Based on: "Bad Romance" by Lady Gaga
- Produced by: Hao Wu
- Starring: Nranus Chen; Jason Lau; Hayden Leung; Will Bay; Chan Chan; François Chang; Macha Hsiao; Xiaoguang Chen; Marie Robin; Yeting Wen; Hao Wu; Jia Zhang
- Cinematography: François Chang; Xiaoguang Chen; Xiang Gao
- Edited by: François Chang
- Music by: Chan Chan; Young Luo
- Release date: 7 May 2011 (Boston LGBT Film Festival)
- Running time: 90 minutes
- Country: China
- Language: Mandarin

Bad Romance (Chinese: 花为眉; pinyin: Hua wei mei; Alt. title: Les Mauvais Romans) is a mainland China 2011 independent drama film. Its English-language title was based on the song "Bad Romance", by singer-songwriter Lady Gaga. It was written and directed by first-time filmmaker François Chang, who has taken the essence of the song to create a story focussing on seven lonely individuals whose lives could be transformed after experiencing love at first sight.

The film premiered at the 27th Annual Boston LGBT Festival on 7 May 2011, and features male full-frontal nudity.

The director has subsequently directed two other films: Chifumi (2013) and The Forgiven (2015).

== Plot ==
The story follows seven young men and women and their love lives: heterosexual, homosexual and bisexual, across the city of Beijing. A single mother meets a young student; a city boy meets a guy of his dream; a girl falls into a love game between a male and a female classmate from her French class.

== Production ==
Bad Romance was filmed on location in Beijing, and was written, filmed and edited by debut Chinese filmmaker François Chang, with a largely unknown cast, an original music score combined with the popularly known music of singer/songwriter Lady Gaga, and a limited budget.

French language and culture feature prominently, with homage paid to Eric Rohmer's Six Contes Moraux, the music of Edith Piaf and the use of the Beijing Alliance Française as a location, setting the stage for a mixture of Asian and European culture and mores. The French singers are contrasted with Chinese opera where there is substantial variation in the timbre, tone and texture, but with similar messages. Photography and music are used to highlight the plot. The early-scene sun umbrella is intended to remind the viewer of Georges Seurat's "Sunday Afternoon on the Island of La Grande Jatte," while the minimalist string-rich score provides an accompaniment to the principal characters' contrasting lives.

== Main cast ==
- Nranus Chen ... Xiao Ya
- Jason Lau ... Liu Cong
- Hayden Leung ... Liang Qing
- Will Bay ... Bei Si
- Chan Chan ... Yasmine
- François Chang ... François
- Macha Hsiao ... Loulou
- Xiaoguang Chen ... Male Lover / Neighbor
- Marie Robin ... Teacher
- Yeting Wen ... Kindergarten Teacher
- Hao Wu ... Bartender
- Jia Zhang ... Female Lover

== See also ==
- List of Chinese films of 2011
- List of lesbian, gay, bisexual or transgender-related films
- List of lesbian, gay, bisexual, or transgender-related films by storyline
- Nudity in film (East Asian cinema since 1929)
