= Capital Games =

- Film poster
- Directed by: Ilo Orleans
- Screenplay by: Wendell Lu
- Story by: G.A. Hauser
- Based on: Capital Games by G.A. Hauser
- Produced by: G.A. Hauser
- Starring: Shane Keough; Eric Presnall; Rory Cosgrove; Bob Hosko; Dewitt Duncan; Jordan Rivers
- Cinematography: Peter Borosh
- Edited by: Katiene Norton
- Music by: Leandro Gaetan; John Turner
- Production companies: G.A. Hauser Collection; Ad Hoc Productions
- Distributed by: Breaking Glass Pictures
- Release date: July 19, 2013 (Q Fest)
- Running time: 97 minutes
- Country: United States
- Language: English

Capital Games is a 2013 American gay-themed film directed by Ilo Orleans. Produced by G.A. Hauser as based upon her own book, and with a screenplay by Wendell Lu, the film premiered at Qfest in 2013.

== Plot ==
The film follows the lives of two impressive, ambitious and sleek men. One of the two men is Steve Miller (Eric Presnall), a mature, strong, clean-cut man who leaves his job as an LAPD police officer in Los Angeles in pursuit of a calmer and less hectic career. The second prominent character is Mark Richfield (Rory Cosgrove), who proves to be lively, charismatic, charming and lovable around the office. Mark's attractive character and his superior communication skills places him in a unique position to apply for a promotion. Miller has ambitions for a top position in the advertising company and is hopeful to win the job until he learns of the new hot-shot, Mark, in the office. Mark's charm and passion wins him favor with his colleagues and boss, bringing in jealousy between the two.

Steve realizes that the corporate world is just as mean and cut-throat as the streets of Los Angeles, when the new British hire is still a shoo-in for his position, pushing him further into jealousy. The two antagonists head out for a team-building exercise in the Santa Fe desert for a business retreat that goes wrong. The two men find themselves igniting affection and sharing a passionate night, leaving the two deeply conflicted. Steve is later devastated by his discovery that Mark is engaged to marry in a month's time, to a fiancé who is too excited about the wedding. The two fight between passionate love and mutual respect and the growing hate caused by their career competition and growing affection.

== Cast ==
- Shane Keough as Jack Larsen
- Eric Presnall as Steve Miller
- Rory Cosgrove as Mark Richfield
- Bob Hosko as Harold Parsons
- Jordan Rivers as Kevin
- Dewitt Duncan as Charlie
- Corinne Fox as Sharon Tice
- Rebekah Apodaca as Laura
- Paula Ray as Sonya Knight
- John Schaaf as ex-Sgt Dick Miller
- Paul Caster as Mr. Foist
- Lena Ann Balambao as Steve's Mom
- Scott Herald as Sharon's father
- Chuck Erickson as Roland
- G.A. Hauser as Ms Bakewell
- Julian Cordova as Ad executive
- Dion Hindi as Ad executive
- Patricia Jimenez as Ad executive
- Alicia R. Martinez as Ad executive
- Angela Miesch as Ad executive
- Cindy Wilson as Ad executive
- Jeree Tomasi as Ad executive
- James Wisniewski as Ad executive- Foist
- Emily Layton as Petula- ranch facilitator
- Terrilyn Morris as Amber / receptionist
- Earl Schwers as Justice of the Peace
- Robb Moon as Waiter
- Jim Mixon as Restaurant patron
- Kerryanne Devine as Restaurant patron
- Cristo Cabrera as Restaurant patron
- Melven Louis as Restaurant patron
- Maxx Wayne as Restaurant patron
