= Toronto Reel Asian International Film Festival =

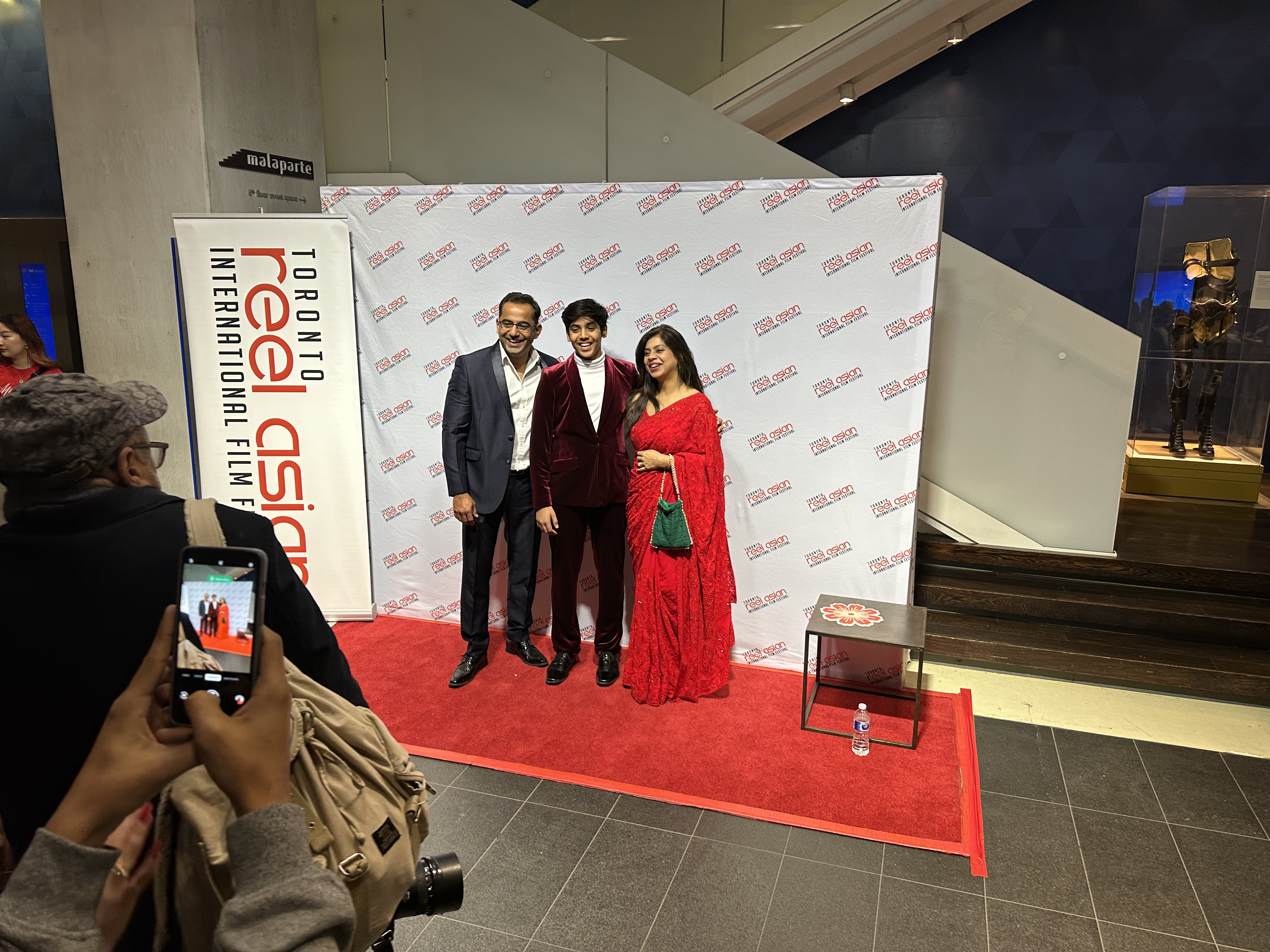
- Gala at the screening of the film "Mustache" at the TIFF Bell Lightbox in 2023
- Location: Toronto, Canada
- Founded: 1 January 1997; 28 years ago
- No. of films: 27 in 2023
- Website: www.reelasian.com

The Toronto Reel Asian International Film Festival is a charitable cultural film festival organization located in Toronto, Ontario, Canada, that advocates Asian representations in media arts. Works include films and videos by artists in Canada, the U.S., Asia and all over the world. As Canada's largest and longest-running Pan-Asian film festival in Canada with a 27-year history, Reel Asian provides a public forum for Asian media artists and their work, and fuels the growing appreciation for Asian cinema in Canada.

== History ==
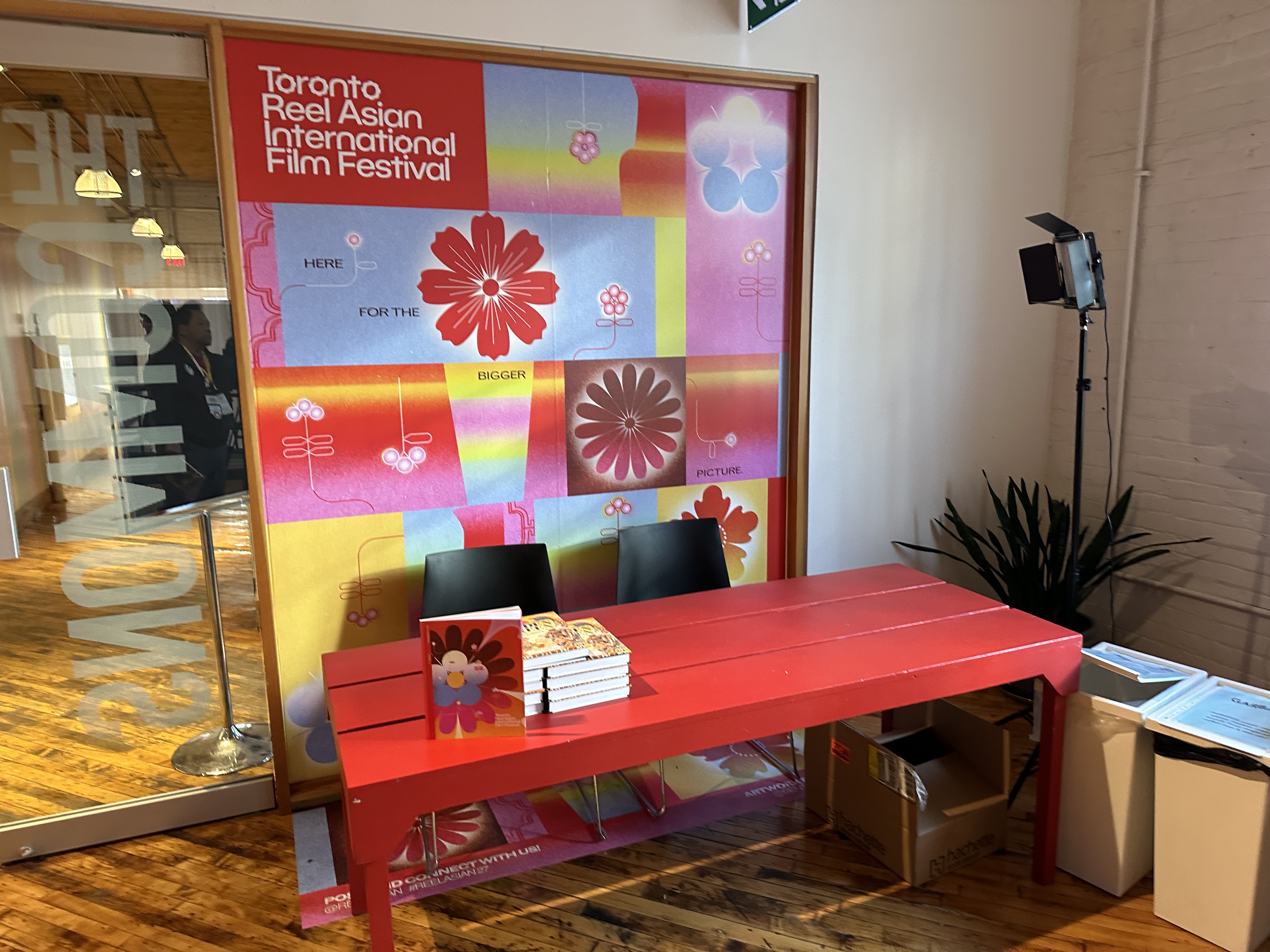
Film festival facility at The Commons

The film festival was founded in 1997 by film producer Anita Lee and journalist Andrew Sun in Toronto, Ontario, Canada. The festival is held annually in November, featuring local and international films and artwork. Reel Asian has year round programs to promote local artists to showcase their skills such as: So You Think You Can Pitch, Unsung Voices Youth Video Workshop, and Reel Ideas.

== Notable guests ==
Guests such as Simon Yam, Philip Yung, Randall Okita, Ann Marie Fleming, Jus Reign, Tony Wu, Derek Tsang, Gingger Shankar, Rhydian Vaughan, Fu Tien-Yu. The Kim's Convenience cast, Paul Sun-Hyung Lee, Jean Yoon and Simu Liu attended the 2016 film festival and artist panels.
