= Summer of Mesa =

- Film poster
- Directed by: Josh Cox
- Written by: Josh Cox
- Starring: Molly Miles; Andrea Granera; Alec Bandzes; Patricia Ellis
- Cinematography: Josh Cox
- Edited by: Josh Cox
- Production company: Americana Pictures
- Distributed by: Americana Pictures YouTube
- Release date: May 22, 2020
- Running time: 76 minutes
- Country: United States
- Language: English
- Budget: $400.00

Summer of Mesa is a 2020 coming-of-age romantic drama film written and directed by Josh Cox who was 20 years old during the shoot. Set in 1985 on Cape Cod, Massachusetts, it stars Molly Miles, Andrea Granera, and Alec Bandzes. The story chronicles the romantic relationship between 16-year-old Lily, and Mesa, a girl her age who she meets on the peninsula.

== Plot ==
Lily Peony is a precocious sixteen-year-old girl who spends her summers on Cape Cod with her grandmother Anna. Throughout the previous years vacationing, the Peonys grew close with a Cape-native family: single-mother Velma and her teenage son John. During the summer of 1985, after being away from the peninsula for some time, Lily and John find themselves pursuing a mature and unexpected romance which has them both falling quickly for each other. That year, Lily also happens to meet Mesa - a teenage girl who is fascinating to Lily for her undeniable confidence and indescribable beauty. Mesa takes a clear interest in befriending Lily, intrigued by her quiet and mature nature. Through their shared time together, Lily realizes her feelings for Mesa are rather different from her feelings when she is with John. This provokes her internal struggle to identify herself, and feelings for Mesa, over her seemingly more traditional, yet less passionate, relationship with John.

== Cast ==
- Molly Miles as Lily Peony
- Andrea Granera as Mesa
- Alec Bandzes as John 'Johnny' Valentine
- Patricia Ellis as Anna Peony
- Kristin Stearns-Stewart as Velma Valentine
- William Cummings as Noah

== Production ==
With a budget $400, principal photography lasted six days, with locations on Cape Cod. Cox acted as the sole crew member throughout the shoot.

== Release ==
The film premiered on YouTube on May 22, 2020, as its worldwide release and received over 100,000 views in its opening week.

== Reception ==
Summer of Mesa has received a positive response from film critics, appearing on top queer film watchlists from GCN Magazine, among others. On review aggregator website Rotten Tomatoes, the film is praised by online publications such as Flickering Myth who compares Summer of Mesa to The Notebook “but for queer teens.”

Rob Rector of Film Threat's consensus of the film is that “[Summer of Mesa] is a wispy, delicate, dreamlike feature that showcases the beauty and heartache of summertime romance.”

== Sequel ==
A follow-up film was announced via the film's official Instagram and indie-film website The Fandomentals on May 27, 2021. The film is set to follow the titular character Mesa as she continues to navigate her sexual identity one summer after the events of the first film.

In an interview with lesbian media company Lesflicks, filmmaker Josh Cox described the sequel as being unlike cliché romance films "where we’re trying to get two characters to get together," and rather a story about "[a] queer person just going through complex emotions and feelings and trying to move past them."
