= The Toilers and the Wayfarers =

- Directed by: Keith Froelich
- Written by: Keith Froelich
- Produced by: Keith Froelich
- Cinematography: James Frank Tittle
- Edited by: Keith Froelich
- Music by: Chan Poling
- Distributed by: CMV Laservision
- Release date: March 14, 1997 (U.S.)
- Country: United States
- Languages: English; German

The Toilers and the Wayfarers is a 1997 LGBT dramatic film written and directed by Keith Froelich. It was released on 14 March 1997.

The film is set and filmed in New Ulm, in southern Minnesota.

== Plot ==
The story is told from the perspective of Dieter, a German boy who lives in the USA. Dieter's childhood friend, Phillip, is gay and has feelings for him. When Phillip kisses Dieter during a play fight, Dieter is disgusted and runs away. Phillip leaves town heartbroken.

In the meantime, we see Udo, a young man lving with his aunt Anna. Udo and Dieter become friends, to the dismay of Dieter's parents. Udo is a lazy bum, upsetting his aunt and the neighbours alike. When aunt Anna dies, Udo quits his job and buys a stolen car with the inherited money. Udo wants to take Dieter on a trip in his new car, but Dieter's father intervenes. Mad at Udo and thinking that the two boys are too close, he forbids Dieter from seeing him and spanks the boy on his bare bottom. Later, we see Dieter at Udo's house hiding from his conservative family.

The two embark on a trip to the big city. However, as soon as they get there police takes notice of their car. Udo and Dieter end up on foot and decide to only speak English in order to keep a low profile. They manage to get another cheap car but it soon breaks down. The mechanic is a nice man who speaks German and takes a liking to the boys, as he wasn't allowed to speak his native language in school and as he has no children of his own.

While in the city Dieter finds Phillip in a cafe and realises how much he missed him. Phillip is happy to see his friend and shows Dieter the perks of a big city and the place where he lives. Dieter is shocked to find out that Phillip prostitutes himself to obtain money, even though Phillip seems content with this and even suggests to Dieter that he could try to as well and stay with him in the city. The boys spend several days together and the old flame between them is rekindled, this time Dieter accepting his feelings for Phillip.

Later we see Phillip sick and Dieter on the street searching for clients. A plainclothes police officer offers him money in exchange for services and arrests him. A police lieutenant contacts Dieter's parents who do not want him home. Dieter risks being taken to juvenile prison. He uses his right to a phone call to warn Udo to leave the city before the police find his address. Udo returns to the kind mechanic who allows him to live with him and his wife until his life is sorted. Dieter tricks the officers and manages to escape. He returns to Phillip. The two embrace and make love.

Eventually Dieter leaves Phillip, who is still sick, and flees to New York. While waiting for his train he meets a stranger who advises him to return to his home country.

== Cast ==
- Matt Klemp as Dieter
- Ralf Schirg as Udo
- Andrew Woodhouse as Phillip
- Jerome Samuels as Helmut
- Joan Wheeler as Anna
- Michael Glen as Lt. Scallion
- Ralph Jacobus as Carl
- Douglas Blacks as Gym Coach / Man at Bus Depot
- Anthony C. Paul as Paul
- Johanna Stucki as Renate
- Alex Cole as Car Dealer
- Michael A. Sward as Gay Hustler
