= Rainbow Without Colours =

2015 Vietnamese movie

- Directed by: Nguyen Quang Tuyen
- Screenplay by: Nguyen Quang Tuyen
- Produced by: Nguyen Quang Tuyen; Van Cong Vien; Lan Quy Tong
- Starring: Nguyen Thanh Tu; Vu Tuan Viet; Khanh Kim; Tung Yuki; Viet My
- Cinematography: Minh Tran
- Music by: Chau Dang Khoa
- Production companies: Leo Media and Technology
- Distributed by: Other World Sound Production
- Release date: August 2015 (WFF)
- Running time: 93 minutes
- Country: Vietnam
- Language: Vietnamese

Rainbow Without Colours (Vietnamese: Cầu vồng không sắc) is a 2015 Vietnamese film directed by Nguyen Quang Tuyen. It was screened at the 39th Montreal World Film Festival. The film stars Nguyen Thanh Tu as Hoang and Vu Tuan Viet as Hung, and focuses on the romantic relationship between two stepbrothers and their parents after they announce their love to their family. The film received good reviews from both critics and audiences.

== Plot ==
Mr. and Mrs. Huynh are a wealthy marriage that lives in Ho Chi Minh City with their two children, Hoang and Lan, and their adopted son, Hung. The two boys spent all the time together, and one day, they announce their love to their family. However, their mother cannot accept it and tries to stop her sons from following a homosexual lifestyle. Her blind motherly love drives Hung to his death and Hoang to madness. The film mainly focuses on the relationship between parents and their children in Vietnam, where parents always think they have done the best for their offspring.

== Cast ==
- Nguyen Thanh Tu as Huynh Anh Hoang
- Vu Tuan Viet as Phan Trong Hung
- Khanh Kim as Mrs. Huynh
- Tung Yuki as Mr. Huynh
- Viet My as Huynh Lan
- NSƯT Le Thien as Grandma
- NSƯT Thanh Dien as Grandpa
- Nguyen Hoang as Hoang (young)
- Nguyen Minh Thien Khoi as Hung (young)

== Reception ==
When the film was screened in Vietnam in March 2015, it got special attention from both press and audience, with thousands of reviews from users on social media network such as Facebook. It was described as the only one Vietnamese film that "made audiences cry".

== Awards ==
| Year | Award | Category | Receiver | Result |
|---|---|---|---|---|
| 2016 | Vietnamese Golden Kite Award | Best Featured Film | Rainbow Without Colours | Won |
| 2016 | Vietnamese Golden Kite Award | Best Actor | Nguyen Thanh Tu | Won |
| 2016 | Vietnamese Golden Kite Award | Best Sound Effect | Tran Manh Hoang | Won |
