= Love and Suicide (2006 film) =

2006 film by Mia Salsi

- Love and Suicide
- Directed by: Mia Salsi
- Written by: Mia Salsi; Mimi Loftus
- Produced by: Mia Salsi; Mimi Loftus; Elton Jones
- Starring: Sarah Reardon; Stella Johnson
- Cinematography: Elton Jones
- Edited by: Mia Salsi
- Production company: ME Productions
- Distributed by: Spiral Pictures
- Release date: July 18, 2006
- Running time: 98 minutes
- Country: United States
- Language: English
- Budget: $200,000

Love and Suicide is an American 2006 independent lesbian romance film by Mia Salsi.

== Plot ==
High school student Kaye Canon (Stella Johnson) has recently relocated to New Orleans and quickly befriends Brandy (Tai Cambre), the head cheerleader, along with her circle of friends, including Emily (Sarah Reardon). As Kaye and Emily grow closer, their friendship evolves into a romantic relationship. However, societal pressures and the disapproval of Kaye's family force them to keep their romance hidden.

As their bond deepens, Kaye's reluctance to openly acknowledge their relationship strains their connection. Emily's suspicions grow when Kaye begins dating someone else, leading to a rift in their friendship. The two attempt to reconcile, with Emily giving Kaye a ring as sign of her conviction. Despite this gesture, their relationship continues to deteriorate as Kaye continues to publicly deny their love from their friends.

After graduation, the pair continue to drift and grow apart with them getting different jobs and moving to different places. Emily suspects Kaye is in a relationship with a male co-worker, and later finds a letter in Kaye's room confirming her suspicions. In her grief, Emily attempts suicide by overdosing on pills. Though she survives, their friendship has been irreparably damaged. Kaye receives a box from Emily returning all of the items she had from her, effectively cutting off their relationship completely.

Ten years after the incident, the film shows Kaye (now married) taking off her wedding ring and replacing it with the ring Emily had given her before, before committing suicide. The film ends with Emily receiving news of Kaye's death.

== Cast ==
- Sarah Reardon as Emily Segreto
- Stella Johnson as Kaye Canon
- Peter Boggia as David
- Judy Henderson as Susan
- Ryan Miley as Rick
- Tai Cambre as Brandy
- Jessie Terrebonne as Sarah
- Cole Blackburn as Chuck
- Jen Christensen as Dana
- Greg Williamson as Peter
- Lida Sunsin as Leslie
- Michael Villafranco as Andrew
