= LGBTQ history in China =

The history of lesbian, gay, and bisexual people in China spans thousands of years. For a period of the modern history of both the Republic of China and People's Republic of China in the 20th century, LGBT people received more stringent legal regulations regarding their orientations, with restrictions being gradually eased by the beginning of the 21st century. However, activism for LGBT rights in both countries has been slow in development due to societal sentiment and government inaction.

== Ancient China ==
Homosexuality has been documented in China since ancient times. Homosexuality was regarded differently among social classes and the sexes, meaning that it was at times acceptable but other times not.

The Intrigues of the Warring States, a collection of political advice and stories from before the Han dynasty, refers to Duke Xian of Jin (reigned 676–651 BC) planting a handsome young man in a rival's court in order to influence the other ruler and to give him bad advice. The historian Han Fei recorded a more exalted example in the relationship of Mizi Xia and Duke Ling of Wei. Mizi Xia's sharing of an especially delicious peach with his lover was referenced by later writers as Yútáo, or "the bitten peach". Another example of homosexuality at the highest level of society from the Warring States period is the story of Lord Long Yang and the King of Wei.

== Imperial China ==
Scholar Pan Guangdan (潘光旦) came to the conclusion that many emperors in the Han dynasty had one or more male sex partners. Many were recorded in detailed biographies in the Memoirs of the Historian by Sima Qian and the Records of the Han by Ban Gu. Grand Historian Sima Qian notes that, unlike female wives and concubines, the male companions of the emperors were often admired as much for their administrative abilities as for their sexual abilities:

— Those who served the ruler and succeeded in delighting his ears and eyes, those who caught their lord's fancy and won his favor and intimacy, did so not only through the power of lust and love; each had certain abilities in which he excelled. Thus I made The Biographies of the Emperors' Male Favorites. The proverb says, "No amount of toiling in the fields can compare to a spell of good weather; no amount of faithful service can compare to being liked by your superiors." This is no idle saying. Yet it is not women alone who can use their looks to attract the eyes of the ruler; courtiers and eunuchs can play at that game as well. Many were the men of ancient times who gained favor this way.

The last of these emperors overlapped chronologically with "all but one" of the first fourteen Roman emperors held to be bisexual or exclusively homosexual by historian Edward Gibbon. The Emperor Cheng of Han, also named Liu Ao, was a bisexual person. According to the Book of Han, he had a male lover named Zhang Fang. They were deeply in love with each other, but were forced to depart by Liu Ao's mother, the Grand Empress Dowager Wang. Besides this lover, he also had many famous empresses and imperial concubines, like Zhao Feiyan, Zhao Hede, Empress Xu and Ban Jieyu.

The Han emperor most strongly devoted to his male companion was Emperor Ai, who "by nature...did not care for women", and who attempted to pass the throne on to his lover, Dongxian. The story of Emperor Ai which most struck later writers, however, was when the Emperor carefully cut off his sleeve, so as not to awake Dongxian, who had fallen asleep on top of it. The cut sleeve was imitated by many people at court and became known as Duànxiù, or "breaking the sleeve". This phrase was linked with the earlier story of Mizi Xia's bitten peach to create the formulaic expression yútáo duànxiù (余桃断袖) to refer to homosexuality in general.

Throughout written Chinese history, the role of women is given little positive emphasis, with relationships between women being especially rare. One mention by Ying Shao, who lived about 140 to 206, does relate palace women attaching themselves as husband and wife, a relationship called dui shi. He noted, "They are intensely jealous of each other."

Except in unusual cases, such as Emperor Ai, the men named for their homosexual relationships in the official histories appear to have had active heterosexual lives as well. It is, in fact, impossible to know the full sexuality of any historical figures from most of Chinese history, unless they are indicated to be bisexual, since only affairs which were considered out of the ordinary were documented. Neither heterosexuality nor homosexuality were considered out of the ordinary for most of that history, so the fact that only one of the two was documented cannot rule out the other.

The cases of Huo Guang, who served as regent of the Western Han, and General Liang Ji, who dominated the government of Han China in the 150's, are typical of bisexuals whose homosexuality would not have been mentioned had it not been seen as unusual in some way. Huo Guang was infatuated with his slave master, Feng Zidu, a fact that "provoked laughter in the wineshops of foreigners", but which did not have much effect on his own countrymen. What did surprise them was when Huo Guang's widow took up with the slave master after her husband's death. For two lower-status individuals, one a woman and one a servant, to dishonor their master's memory in this way was considered shocking, and so the relationship was made note of.

Similarly, General Liang Ji, had both a wife, Sun Shou, and a male slave, Qin Gong, who was acknowledged publicly with a status similar to a concubine. In this specific case, the relationship made it into the histories only because Liang Ji showed exceptional devotion to his wife, sharing the slave Qin Gong with her in a ménage à trois. It was not Liang Ji's bisexuality which was considered noteworthy, but rather the fact that he let two of his lower-ranking lovers enjoy each other instead of demanding that they each concentrate solely on him.

Two notable scholars, Ruan Ji and Ji Kang, were unique as egalitarian, long-term partners in the 3rd century. They were members of the anti-establishment Seven Sages of the Bamboo Grove, and their relationship reflected that group's vaunting of mystical, rustic, and simple life over the corruption, hierarchy, and intrigue at court. According to Lady Han, the wife of another sage of the Bamboo Grove, Shan Tao, who spied on the two in their bedroom, they were also sexually talented.

Writings from the Liu Song dynasty claimed that homosexuality was as common as heterosexuality in the late 3rd century:

All the gentlemen and officials esteemed it. All men in the realm followed this fashion to the extent that husbands and wives were estranged. Resentful unmarried women became jealous.

One of the earliest mentions of the actor-prostitutes who would become common later in Chinese history is also from the Jin dynasty.

According to the Book of Jin, the Emperor Fu Jian, also the Shi Zu of Former Qin, used to take a beautiful princess and a prince together back to his palace, and loved them both. Years later, this prince Murong Chong organized an army, defeated Emperor Fu Jian and established a new empire.

Poems written by and for the future Emperor Jianwen of Liang also highlight the luxurious but ultimately degrading role of the male prostitute at the time.

The aristocratic poet Yu Xin was representative of the more subtle system of patronage which existed without the stigma of prostitution, whereby a poorer or younger man could provide sexual service to a more established man in return for political advancement. Yu Xin opened his home and provided a standing reference for the younger Wang Shao, who repaid him by serving as a sort of butler and sex provider. Wang Shao went on to become an official censor.

With the rise of the Tang dynasty, China became increasingly influenced by the sexual mores of foreigners from Western and Central Asia, and female companions began to accumulate the political power previously accumulated by male companions at the imperial court. At the same time, the actual power of the imperial court was in decline relative to intermediate rule by scholar-bureaucrats. The first negative term for homosexuality in Chinese- 'jijian', connoting illicit sexuality- appears at this time.

The following Song dynasty was the last dynasty to include a chapter on male companions to the emperors in official documents. In addition to Central Asian influence, the Song dynasty saw the first widespread adoption of Indian Buddhism, which derided sexuality in general. Increasing urbanization caused the monetization of all kinds of sexuality, and the first law against male prostitutes, never effectively enforced, went into effect.

After the Song dynasty, homosexual behavior was most documented amongst the gentry and merchant classes, since these were the people who were doing most of the writing. Practically all officials of this class maintained a wife or wives to produce heirs, and used their economic advantage to engage in relationships, heterosexual and homosexual, which gave them unequal power. Thus documentation focuses on male courtesans or "singing boys" in luxurious but decadent surroundings who must take on a female role to please wealthy patrons intent on maintaining their role as the masculine partner in the agreement.

According to Bret Hinsch in the book Passions of the cut sleeve: the male homosexual tradition in China, the Zhengde Emperor of the Ming dynasty had a homosexual relationship with a Muslim leader from Hami, named Sayyid Husain, who served as the overseer in Hami during the Ming Turpan Border Wars. In addition to having relationships with men, the Zhengde Emperor also had many relationships with women. He sought the daughters of many of his officials. The other Muslim in his court, a Central Asian called Yu Yung, sent Uighur women dancers to the emperor's quarters for sexual purposes. The emperor appears to be also fond of exotic women from border areas such as Mongols and Uighur.

Still, Chinese homosexuals did not experience persecution which would compare to that experienced by homosexuals in Christian Europe during the Middle Ages, and in some areas, same sex love was particularly appreciated. There was a stereotype in the late Ming dynasty that the province of Fujian was the only place where homosexuality was prominent, but Xie Zhaozhe (1567–1624) wrote that "from Jiangnan and Zhejiang to Beijing and Shanxi, there is none that does not know of this fondness." European Jesuit missionaries such as Matteo Ricci took note of what they deemed "unnatural perversions", distressed over its often open and public nature. Historian Timothy Brook writes that abhorrence of sexual norms went both ways, since "the celibate Jesuits were rich food for sexual speculation among the Chinese."

Although the province of Fujian was not alone in open homosexuality in the 17th century, it was the site of a unique system of male marriages, attested to by the scholar-bureaucrat Shen Defu and the writer Li Yu, and mythologized in the folk tale The Leveret Spirit. The older man in the union would play the masculine role as a qixiong or "adoptive older brother", paying a "bride price" to the family of the younger man- it was said virgins fetched higher prices- who became the qidi, or "adoptive younger brother". Li Yu described the ceremony, "They do not skip the three cups of tea or the six wedding rituals- it is just like a proper marriage with a formal wedding." The qidi then moved into the household of the qixiong, where he would be completely dependent on him, be treated as a son-in-law by the qixiong's parents, and possibly even help raise children adopted by the qixiong. These marriages could last as long as 20 years before both men were expected to marry women in order to procreate.

A more individual example of a marriage-like relationship between men was that formed by the scholar-bureaucrat Bi Yuan 畢沅 (1730–1797) and the Suzhou actor Li Guiguan. The two men exchanged vows of fidelity, and Li Guiguan retired from the stage to be addressed by acquaintances as Bi's wife. Unlike the Fujian marriages, this was a unique relationship in its locality, so much so that it was still remembered 200 years later, when it inspired the novel Precious Mirror of Ranking Flowers by Chen Sen.

Another example of the high status of homosexuality in Fujian province, clearly not shared by the centralized Chinese government by this time, was recorded by Qing official Zhu Gui (1731–1807), a grain tax circuit intendant of Fujian in 1765. Intending to standardize the morality of the people under his jurisdiction, he promulgated a "Prohibition of Licentious Cults". One cult which he found particularly troublesome was the cult of Hu Tianbao. As he reports,

The image is of two men embracing one another; the face of one is somewhat hoary with age, the other tender and pale. [Their temple] is commonly called the small official temple. All those debauched and shameless rascals who on seeing youths or young men desire to have illicit intercourse with them pray for assistance from the plaster idol. Then they make plans to entice and obtain the objects of their desire. This is known as the secret assistance of Hu Tianbao. Afterwards they smear the idol's mouth with pork intestine and sugar in thanks.

Ming dynasty China banned homosexual sodomy (anal sex) in the Ming Code since the Jiajing emperor's reign and continued into the Qing dynasty until 1907, when western influence led to the law being repealed. The Chinese mocked and insulted Puyi and the Japanese as homosexuals and presented it as proof of their perversion and being uncivilized. The only time homosexual sodomy (anal sex) has been banned in Japan was for short time for 8 years in 1872–1880 due to western influence.

The Qing dynasty instituted the first law against consensual, non-monetized homosexuality in China. It has been construed that this may have been part of an attempt to limit all personal expression outside government-monitored relationships, coming in response to the social chaos at the end of the Ming dynasty. The punishment, which included a month in prison and 100 heavy blows, was actually the lightest punishment which existed in the Qing legal system.

The homosexual tradition in China was largely censored as antiquated by the Self-Strengthening Movement, when homophobia was imported to China along with Western science and philosophy,

== People's Republic of China ==
While many dissidents would be imprisoned, it is unclear if LGBT people were specifically targeted for oppression due to their sexual identity. Reportedly, Mao Zedong believed in the sexual castration of "sexual deviants" but little is known about the Communist Chinese government's official policy with regards to homosexuality prior to the 1980s.

Even as late as the early 1980s, there were some Chinese men seeking asylum in other countries reported that they had faced systematic discrimination and harassment from the government because of their sexual orientation as well as similar mistreatment from family members. Likewise, the Chinese government did treat homosexuality as a disease and subjected gay men to electric shock therapy and other attempts to change their sexual orientation.

=== Modern China ===
Despite reports of harassment and discrimination, a liberalization trend was gradually taking place in the 1980s through to the early 2000s (decade). This process is intricately tied to Deng Xiaoping's economic reforms in the 1970s, such as the Open Door Policy in 1978, and the self-identified quality of "Opening Up" (kaifang) embraced during this period of reform.

In the 1980s, greater public discussion and research of homosexuality became permitted. One of the first Hong Kong gay rights activists and writers to study the history of homosexuality in China was Xiaomingxiong (also known as Samshasha), author of the comprehensive "The History of Homosexuality in China" (1984). By the mid-1980s Chinese researchers on the mainland had begun investigating same-sex relationships in China. Some of the most notable work was conducted by sexologist Ruan Fangfu, who in 1991 published in English Sex in China: Studies in Sexology in Chinese Culture.

The first recorded gay and lesbian community began to develop in the early 1990s in Beijing, however homosexuality was a relatively sensitive topic until the early 2000s. The introduction of the internet in 1998 allowed for a convenient medium for LGBT activists to connect and communicate. Online chatrooms were a great resource for grassroots LGBT organizations.

In 1997, the Chinese criminal code was revised to eliminate the vague crime of "hooliganism", which had been used as a de facto ban on private, adult, non-commercial and consensual homosexual conduct.

On April 20, 2001, the Chinese Classification of Mental Disorders formally removed homosexuality from its list of mental illnesses.

An internet survey in 2000 showed that Chinese people are becoming more tolerant towards homosexuality: among the 10,792 surveyed, 48.15% were in favor, 30.9% disapproved, 14.46% were uncertain, and 7.26% were indifferent. Gay bashing is rare in modern China. The authorities do not actively promote gay issues in China. Although there is no law against homosexuality or same-sex acts between consenting adults, neither are there laws requiring people to accept individuals who engage in gay acts. It is believed that the Chinese policy towards the gay issue remains the "Three nos": no approval, no disapproval, and no promotion (不支持, 不反对, 不提倡, bù zhīchí, bù fǎnduì, bù tíchàng).

In 2001, the Beijing Queer Film Festival was founded by LGBT film director Cui Zi'en, with the intention to be community-led, although in subsequent years faced regular cancellations by the Beijing authorities, media censorship and police raids, as reported in a 2011 documentary by Chinese filmmaker Yang Yang, entitled Our Story: The Beijing Queer Film Festival's 10 Years of "Guerrilla Warfare" (我們的故事：北京酷兒影展十年游擊戰).

A 2008 survey by sexologist Li Yinhe shows a mixed picture of public attitudes towards gays and lesbians in China. 91% of respondents said they agreed with homosexuals having equal employment rights, while over 80% of respondents agreed that heterosexuals and homosexuals were "equal individuals". On the other hand, a slight majority disagreed with the proposition that an openly gay person should be a school teacher, and 40% of respondents said that homosexuality was "completely wrong."

The number of Chinese identifying as homosexual remains unclear. The Ministry of Health estimated there were five to 10 million homosexuals in mainland China (0.4–0.8% of the population), aged between 15 and 65 in 2006. Sociologist Li Yinhe estimates it is between 36 and 48 million. One statement based on Chinese government documents and academic studies states that the figure is 15 million. An official statistic, as quoted in a news report in China Daily, put the figure for mainland China at "approximately 30 million" (2.3% of the population), though it admitted many Chinese would not openly declare their sexual orientation.

The mainstream media sometimes cover notable gay events abroad, such as pride parades. Some critics charge that the purpose of the media is mostly to smear homosexuality. Lacking a film rating system, the Chinese government forbids gay movies to be shown on TV or in theaters because they are "inappropriate". New Western films, like Brokeback Mountain in 2006, were denied release in the mainland, even though there was an overall public interest as the film was directed by Ang Lee.

Although more prominent in first-tier Chinese cities like Beijing, Shanghai, Guangzhou, and Shenzhen, gay clubs, bars, tea houses, saunas, and support centers are also becoming more widespread in second-tier cities like Xi'an, Dalian, and Kunming. Occasionally, these locations are subject to police harassment. Similar to the development of the gay scene in other countries, other less formal 'cruising spots' exist in parks, public washrooms, malls, and public shower centers. Being gay is particularly difficult in the countryside; in China this is especially severe as the vast majority of people live in the countryside with no Internet access and no possibility to move to a city. Country dwellers do not often speak of homosexuality, and when they do, it is usually considered a disease.

Until recently, those participating in gay activities were still punished by the justice system and pursued by the police, and were liable to be detained and arrested. In October 1999, a Beijing court ruled that homosexuality was "abnormal and unacceptable to the Chinese public". Another notable case happened in July 2001, when at least 37 men who were behaving in a homosexual manner were detained in Guangdong. In late April 2004, the State Administration of Radio, Film, and Television initiated a campaign to clear violence and sexual content from the media. Programs related to homosexual topics or language were considered to be going against the healthy way of life in China. As recently as April 2011, police raided a gay bar in Shanghai and detained at least 60 of its patrons overnight.

As early as 2004 and having seen rapid rises in HIV infection among gay and bisexual men in other Asian countries, provincial- and city-level health departments began HIV-related research among men who have sex with men (MSM). In 1996, AIDS-related funds from the government were just over $500,000 but by 2001 this figured reached nearly $10 million annually. The AIDS public health crisis remains one of the most influential variables for the rise of LGBT groups worldwide. However this funding was mostly focused on gay groups so other sexual minorities groups have developed more slowly in comparison. In January 2006 the State Council of the People's Republic of China issued Regulations on AIDS Prevention and Treatment. The document specifically mentioned MSM as a population that is vulnerable to HIV infection and directed officials and organizations on every level to include MSM in HIV-prevention activities. In April 2008, under the direction of the National Center for HIV/AIDS, 61 cities in China initiated community-based studies of MSM and their potential risk for becoming infected with HIV. Concurrent to these studies, HIV prevention programs were initiated in those same cities using a peer led intervention model.

In June 2009, China's first gay pride festival was held in Shanghai, which was followed by a seven-day film festival featuring LGBT-themed films. On August 25, 2009, after police crackdown on gay meeting places in Guangzhou, about 100 gay men publicly protested in the People's Park, a popular hangout for gays. According to Human Rights Watch, the protest "has been hailed as a milestone" in the history of LGBT rights in China.

A 2010 photographic campaign dubbed "Smile4Gay", which featured heterosexual mainland Chinese holding signs in support for LGBT people and LGBT rights, attracted more than 4,409 willing participants, a figure which more than twice surpassed the founder's initial estimated turnout. While a majority of the supporters came from those in their twenties, several adolescents, middle-aged adults, and even elderly individuals showed their support. Multiple Buddhist monks also posed.

In early July 2011, Lu Liping, a famous actress, criticized homosexuality in a micro-blog post, calling it "a shameful conduct which is judged by God." This incident followed by numerous debates across Chinese internet portals and even a report on CCTV (China's Central Television) news channel, in which the news reporter defended homosexuals, as decent members of society that should have similar privileges as anyone else. Lu's husband, Sun Haiying, also made public comments in 2007 which condemned homosexuality and bisexuality as "criminal in nature" and akin to "one night stands, keeping of mistresses, wife-swapping and swinging", attracting the attention of China Daily columnist Raymond Zhou (who, in turn, received an email by Shirley Phelps-Roper of the Westboro Baptist Church in response to his article).

When comparing the situation of male homosexuals to that of lesbians, many Chinese believe that lesbians are less offensive to the mainstream compared to gay males. Furthermore, men have more responsibility to carry on the family line, therefore gay men can feel greater pressure than women. Liberalization and social change are making life easier for same-sex attracted citizens to some extent, but the one-child policy keeps the pressure to get married very high, and lesbians often cannot resist such a family and social demand, though the Chinese government announced in November 2013, that it would relax the policy by allowing families to have two children if one of the parents is an only child.

Inside the LGBT movement in China the gay moment is dominant while other sexual minorities have historically been relegated. On December 11, 2011, a group calling themselves "Pretty Fighters" issued a manifesto proclaiming, "We are lalas. We are queer. We want to speak out." This controversy started when the Aibai organization (a major LGBT group in China) made claims that homosexuality is inborn and that queer theory, which upholds the possibility of plurality in sexual desire, was harmful to the LGBT movement. This debate eventually led to the lesbian movement declaring independence from the gay movement. "The Pretty Fighter Debate" was a major event for the LGBT movement within China because it hailed the lack of gender awareness in China, marked the independence of the lesbian movement, and defined "queer lala" as inclusive of other sexual mores including transgender individuals.

On December 19, 2014, a Chinese gay man who goes by the pseudonym Xiao Zhen won a lawsuit filed with Beijing's Haidian District People's Court in May. Xiao Zhen accused a psychiatric counseling clinic named Xinyu Piaoxiang in Chongqing province of offering him "conversion" therapy to "cure" homosexuality by administering hypnosis and electric shock. In February 2014, Xiao Zhen had voluntarily accepted the therapy after being pressured by his parents to marry and have children. After completing the therapy, Xiao Zhen decided to sue the clinic for causing physical, emotional and mental damage through electric shocks and hypnosis. "The clinic in the suit is still offering to cure gay people, and it's not just them. There are lots of clinics and mental hospitals offering this kind of therapy all across the country." The Xinyu Piaoxiang clinic was ordered by the Haidian District People's Court to pay compensation of 3,500 yuan ($560) to Xiao Zhen for costs incurred in the therapy. The clinic was also asked to apologize and stop the "spurious promotion" of "homosexual therapy."

This was the first official Chinese ruling that homosexuality was not a disease and did not require treatment. The verdict was described as "an historical moment" by Geng Le, founder of the gay forum application Blued. "This is the first clear, positive description of homosexuality in the legal area .... The verdict will help gay rights advocates to urge clinics to halt such treatments and persuade parents not to pressure their gay children to undergo therapy," he said.

State censorship of freedom of expression in depicting LGBT relationships remains an issue. In 2015, film-maker Fan Popo sued government censors for pulling his gay documentary Mama Rainbow from online sites. The lawsuit concluded in December 2015 with a finding by Beijing No.1 Intermediate People's Court that the State Administration of Press, Publication, Radio, Film and Television (SAPPRFT) had not requested that hosting sites pull the documentary. Despite this ruling, which Fan felt was a victory because it effectively limited state involvement, "the film is still unavailable to see online on Chinese hosting sites."

In the same year, the ShanghaiPRIDE Film Festival opened. It was founded by Matthew Baren, a Shanghai-based filmmaker, and Alvin Li, an LGBT volunteer who lives in the US and China.

On December 31, 2015, the China Television Drama Production Industry Association posted new guidelines, including a ban on showing queer relationships on TV. The regulations stated: "No television drama shall show abnormal sexual relationships and behaviors, such as incest, same-sex relationships, sexual perversion, sexual assault, sexual abuse, sexual violence, and so on." These new regulations have begun to affect web dramas, which have historically had fewer restrictions:

"Chinese Web dramas are commonly deemed as enjoying looser censorship compared with content on TV and the silver screen. They often feature more sexual, violent and other content that is deemed by traditional broadcasters to fall in the no-no area."

In February 2016 the popular Chinese gay web series Addicted (Heroin) was banned from being broadcast online 12 episodes into a 15-episode season. Makers of the series uploaded the remaining episodes on YouTube, and production of a planned second season remains in doubt.

In early 2017, it was announced that a new community-led, not-for-profit LGBT film festival, the Shanghai Queer Film Festival, would open in September of the same year, to provide a platform for Chinese and other Asian filmmakers, and greater interaction with the audience. The Director of the Festival is Ting Ting Shi.

On July 1, 2017, the Communist Youth League of China Fujian Provincial Committee posted on their Weibo account a condemnation of updated broadcasting guidelines from the China Network Audiovisual Program Services Association, which placed homosexuality under the category of "abnormal sexual behavior."

=== Same-sex marriage in China ===
During the evaluation of the amendment of the marriage law in mainland China in 2003, there was the first discussion about same-sex marriage. Though this issue was rejected, this was the first time that an item of gay rights was discussed in China. However, just not long before the new marriage law went into effect, an officer stated in a press conference that same-sex marriage is still forbidden in China, on August 19, 2003.

Li Yinhe, a sociologist and sexologist well known in the Chinese gay community, has tried to legalize same-sex marriage several times, including during the National People's Congress in 2000 and 2004, Legalization for the Chinese Same-Sex Marriage (中国同性婚姻合法化) in 2000 and the Chinese Same-Sex Marriage Bill (中国同性婚姻提案) in 2004. According to Chinese law, 35 delegates' signatures are needed to make an issue a bill to be discussed in the Congress. Her efforts failed due to lack of support from the delegates. Many scholars as well as gay and lesbians believe it will be difficult to pass such a law in China in the near future.

During the 2006 National People's Congress and again in 2007, Li proposed the same-sex marriage bill again. Some gay web sites called for their members to sign petitions in support of this bill. This bill was dismissed both times.

In July 2015, many gay users of Sina Weibo used the microblogging service to discuss the Obergefell v. Hodges ruling in the US, issues like coming out to parents, and articles in the People's Daily on gay men.

On January 5, 2016, a court in Changsha, southern Hunan province, agreed to hear the lawsuit of 26-year-old Sun Wenlin filed in December 2015 against the Furong district civil affairs bureau for its June 2015 refusal of the right to register to marry his 36-year-old male partner, Hu Mingliang. On April 13, 2016, with hundreds of gay marriage supporters outside, the Changsha court ruled against Sun, who vowed to appeal, citing the importance of his case for LGBT progress in China. On May 17, 2016, Sun and Hu were married in a private ceremony in Changsha, expressing their intention to organize another 99 LGBT weddings across the country in order to normalize gay marriage in China.

== Censorship on LGBTQ-related content ==
Censorship against LGBTQ-related content has been frequently-mentioned problems among LGBTQ communities based in major cities in mainland China. In the summer of 2021, many public WeChat accounts conveying LGBTQ rights ran by college university students were shut down and deleted without any warning. The massive crackdown of LGBTQ accounts in social media has been a major event for Chinese LGBTQ communities in 2021.

== See also ==
- Homosexuality in China
