= Queer China, 'Comrade' China =

- Film poster
- Directed by: Cui Zi'en
- Written by: Cui Zi'en
- Production company: Cuizi DV Studio
- Distributed by: dGenerate Films
- Release date: 2008
- Running time: 118 minutes (60 minutes in the official cut)
- Country: China
- Language: Mandarin

Queer China, 'Comrade' China (Chinese: 誌同志; pinyin: Zhi tong zhi), directed by Cui Zi’en, is a 2008 independent Chinese documentary about homosexuality in China. The film features interviews with prominent academics and activists. Interviewees include the film's director Cui Zi'en, actress and activist Shitou, sociologist Li Yinhe and director Zhang Yuan. It covers 80 years of evolution of Chinese attitudes on LGBTQ people, ending with the proposed 2003 Same-sex Marriage Bill.

== Film Content ==
=== Organization ===
The film consists of 11 "chapters" that discuss aspects and periods of homosexuality in China. Topics discussed include the decriminalization of homosexuality, its removal as a mental illness, the development of queer theory in China, and the appearance of gay people on Chinese television shows.

=== Interviewees ===
In order of appearance:

- Li Yinhe
- Qin Shide
- Zhang Beichuan
- Fuxi
- Shitou
- Guo Xiaofei
- Tongge
- Pan Suiming
- Zhou Dan
- Cheng Qingsong
- Bai Yonggbin
- Zhen Li
- Zhang Yi
- Lisa Rofel
- Qiao Qiao
- Guo Yaqi
- Xu Bin
- Zhitong
- Binglan
- DongDong
- Xiangqi
- Fan Popo
- Mai Kiang
- Zhao Jing
- Gogo
- Chung To
- Paul Crook
- Huang YingYing
- Xu Gehui
- Ming Ming
- Hao Ting
- Da Wei
- Wei Jiang Jiang
- Gao Yanning
- Zhang Yuan
- Yang Yang
- Li Yu
- Meng Nuo
- Zhu Ri Kun
- Wang Wo

== Awards, nominations, and honors ==
- Pusan International Film Festival
  - Official Selection
- 24th Turino GLBT Film Festival
  - Audience Award Best Documentary
- Shanghai PRIDE
  - Opening Night Film
- Beijing Queer Film Festival
  - Official Selection

== See also ==
- Recognition of same-sex unions in China
- LGBT rights in China
- Homosexuality in China
