= List of LGBTQ film festivals =

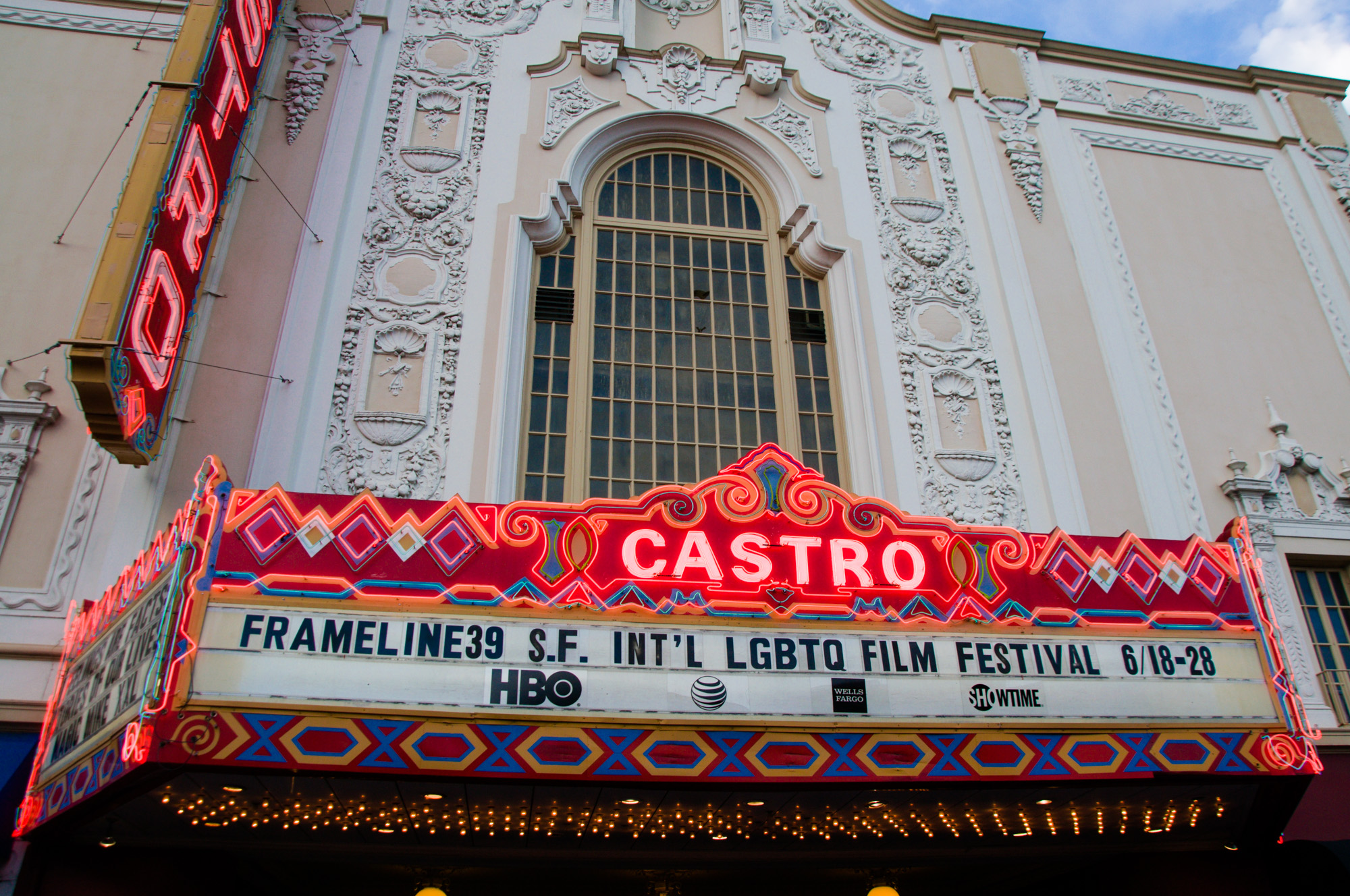
The long-running Frameline Film Festival is held annually at the Castro Theatre in San Francisco.

An LGBTQ film festival or queer film festival is a specialized film festival that has an LGBTQ focus in its selection of films. LGBTQ film festivals often screen films that would struggle to find a mainstream audience and are often activist spaces for awareness-raising around LGBTQ rights as well as for community building among queer communities.

The first LGBTQ-focused film festivals were organized in the United States as part of the awakening LGBTQ movement in the United States in the 1970s. The longest-running film festival with an LGBTQ focus is the Frameline Film Festival in San Francisco, which was established in 1977. Until the 1990s, LGBTQ film festivals were mostly informal screenings in Western countries. In the 1990s, NGOs were founded to create and promote queer-focused film festivals and festivals became more commercialized. Around this time, more queer-focused film festivals began to emerge, especially in East Asia and Eastern Europe.

LGBTQ film festivals use different labels to promote their focus on LGBTQ topics, for instance "gay and lesbian" (such as the Hong Kong Lesbian & Gay Film Festival); "queer" (such as the Asian Queer Film Festival); "rainbow" (such as the Rainbow Reel Tokyo); "LGBT", "LGBTQ", and other variations of the acronym (such as the Connecticut LGBTQ Film Festival); or they might not use a label in their name at all (such as the MIX NYC).

In 2020, several queer film festivals—Los Angeles's Outfest, the New York Lesbian, Gay, Bisexual, & Transgender Film Festival, Toronto's Inside Out Film and Video Festival, and San Francisco's Frameline Film Festival—partnered to launch the North American Queer Festival Alliance, an initiative to further publicize and promote LGBTQ film.

== List ==
| Name | Location | | | Established | Notes |
| Name | City or cities | State, province or region | Country | Established | Notes |
|---|---|---|---|---|---|
| Cinema Queer México | Mexico | CDMX , Chihuahua, Michoacán, Yucatán, Querétaro | Mexico | 2018 | |
| &PROUD Yangon LGBTIQ Film Festival | Yangon | Yangon Region | Myanmar | 2014 | Now part of Yangon Pride, yearly at the end of January |
| Abhimani Film Festival | Colombo | Western Province | Sri Lanka | 2006 | Also known as Celluloid Rainbows, this is the oldest LGBTQ film festival in the South Asian region, and the only LGBTQ film festival in Sri Lanka. |
| Amor Festival | Santiago | | Chile | 2016 | |
| Aomori International LGBTQ Film Festival | Aomori | Aomori Prefecture | Japan | 2006 | |
| Asian Queer Film Festival | Tokyo | Greater Tokyo Area | Japan | 2007 | |
| Asterisco Festival Internacional de Cine LGBTIQ | Buenos Aires | | Argentina | 2014 | |
| Atlanta Film Festival | Atlanta | Georgia | United States | 2008, 1976 (original festival) | Listed for the Pink Peach Prize LGBTQ Film Award, 2008 |
| Bangalore Queer Film Festival | Bangalore | Karnataka | India | 2008 | |
| Bangkok Gay and Lesbian Film Festival | Bangkok | Bangkok Metropolitan Region | Thailand | 2015 | Defunct in 2016 |
| Beijing Queer Film Festival | Beijing | Beijing Municipality | China | 2001 | 2015 LOVE QUEER CINEMA WEEK (BJQFF) |
| BFI Flare: London LGBTIQ+ Film Festival | London | Greater London | United Kingdom | 1986 | |
| Budapest Pride LGBTQ Film Festival | Budapest | | Hungary | | |
| Cancún International Gay Festival | Cancún | | Mexico | | |
| CinegailesAST | Gijón | | Spain | 2006 | |
| Chennai International Queer Film Festival | Chennai | Chennai Metropolitan Area | India | 2005 | |
| Chéries-Chéris | Paris | | France | 1994 | |
| CINHOMO | Valladolid | Castilla y León | Spain | 2017 | |
| Cine Movilh | Santiago | | Chile | | |
| Cinema Queer International Film Festival | Stockholm | | Sweden | 2012 | |
| CINEMQ | Shanghai | Shanghai (municipality) | China | 2015 | |
| CineQ Queer Film Festival | Birmingham | West Midlands | United Kingdom | 2019 | |
| Connecticut LGBTQ Film Festival | Hartford | Connecticut | United States | 1988 | Produced by Out Film CT. Connecticut's longest-running film festival. |
| Counting Past 2 | Toronto | Ontario | Canada | 1997 | First trans film festival, defunct after 2002. |
| Cuórum | Morelia | | Mexico | 2019 | |
| Utah Queer Film Festival | Salt Lake City | Utah | United States | 2003 | Longest-running LGBTQ film festival in the Mountain West. Formerly known as Damn These Heels LGBTQ Film Festival. |
| Dayton LGBTQ Film Festival | Dayton | Ohio | United States | 2005 | |
| DIGO | Goiás | Goiânia | Brazil | 2016 | |
| DIVERSA | Buenos Aires | | Argentina | 2004 | |
| DOTYK | Minsk | Minsk Region | Belarus | 2015 | |
| Durban Gay and Lesbian Film Festival | Durban | | South Africa | 2011 | |
| East London LGBTQ+ Film Festival | London | East London | United Kingdom | 2023 | |
| Écrans mixtes | Lyon | Auvergne-Rhône-Alpes | France | 2011 | |
| Ehime LGBTQ Film Festival | Matsuyama | Ehime Prefecture | Japan | | |
| ENDIMARIS Sitges LGTBIQ+ Film Festival | Sitges | Catalonia | Spain | 2021 | |
| EQUAL Film Fest | San José | | Costa Rica | 2019 | |
| FACE à FACE | Saint-Étienne | Auvergne-Rhône-Alpes | France | 2005 | |
| Fancinegay | Badajoz | | Spain | 1998 | |
| Faroe Islands International Minority Film Festival | Tórshavn | | Faroe Islands | 2017 | |
| Fairy Tales Queer Film Festival | Calgary | Alberta | Canada | 1999 | |
| FestDivQ | Caracas | | Venezuela | | |
| Festival de Cine LesBiGayTrans de Asunción | Asunción | | Paraguay | 2005 | |
| Festival de cine Gay y Lésbico de Canarias | Las Palmas de Gran Canaria and Santa Cruz de Tenerife | | Spain | 2007 | |
| Festival de Cine Lésbico y Gai de Andalucía | Seville, Huelva, Cádiz and Córdoba | | Spain | 2006 | |
| Festival de Cine LGBTIQ - Asturias | Avilés | | Spain | 2016 | |
| Festival Internacional de cine LGBTQ El Lugar Sin Límites | Quito, Guayaquil and others | | Ecuador | 2002 | |
| Festival Mix Brazil de Cultura da Diversidade | São Paulo | | Brazil | | |
| Festival MIX Milano | Milan | Lombardy | Italy | 1986 | Festival MIX Milano of GayLesbian cinema and Queer culture |
| Filmfest homochrom | Cologne & Dortmund | North Rhine-Westphalia | Germany | 2011 | defunct in 2019 |
| FilmOut San Diego | San Diego | California | United States | 2005 | San Diego's only LGBTQ film festival |
| FICGLB – Festival Internacional de Cine Gay y Lésbico de Barcelona | Barcelona | Catalonia | Spain | | |
| FIRE!! | Barcelona | Catalonia | Spain | 1995 | |
| FiveFilms4freedom | Online | Online | United Kingdom | 2015 | World's first online, global and free 10-day LGBTQ film festival, created by the British Council and British Film Institute, and supported by the UN Free & Equal campaign |
| Frameline Film Festival | San Francisco | California | United States | 1977 | |
| Gay Film Nights | Cluj-Napoca | Cluj County | Romania | 2004 | |
| Gaze | Dublin | Leinster | Ireland | 1992 | |
| Geelong Pride Film Festival | Geelong | Victoria | Australia | 2017 | |
| GFest – gayWise LGBTQ Arts Festival | London | Greater London | United Kingdom | | |
| Glasgay! Festival | Glasgow | Scotland | Scotland | 1993 | |
| Hamilton Queer Film Festival | Hamilton | Ontario | Canada | 2021 | |
| Hong Kong Lesbian & Gay Film Festival | Central and Pok Fu Lam | Hong Kong Island | Hong Kong; China | 1989 | |
| Honolulu Rainbow Film Festival | Honolulu | Hawaii | United States | 1989 | |
| Image+Nation | Montreal | Quebec | Canada | 1987 | |
| ImageOut | Rochester | New York | United States | 1993 | |
| In & Out | Nice | Alpes-Maritimes | France | 2009 | |
| Inside Out Film and Video Festival | Toronto and Ottawa | Ontario | Canada | 1991 | |
| Iris Prize Film Festival | Cardiff | Wales | United Kingdom | 2007 | |
| International Queer Film Festival Playa del Carmen | Playa del Carmen | | Mexico | 2013 | |
| Kagawa Rainbow Film Festival | Kagawa | Kagawa Prefecture | Japan | | |
| KASHISH Pride Film Festival | Mumbai | Maharashtra | India | 2010 | India's first mainstream LGBTQ+ film festival & South Asia's biggest |
| Kansai Queer Film Festival | Osaka | Osaka Prefecture | Japan | | |
| Korea Queer Film Festival | Seoul | Seoul Capital Area | South Korea | 2001 | |
| Kreivės | Vilnius | Lithuania | Lithuania | 2014 | The festival is open to feature films, documentaries and short films focusing on lesbian, gay, bisexual, transgender, queer, and intersex themes. |
| Leeds Queer Film Festival | Leeds | West Yorkshire | United Kingdom | 2005 | |
| LesGaiCineMad | Madrid | Community of Madrid | Spain | 1996 | |
| Lethal Lesbian | Tel Aviv | | Israel | 2008 | Screens independent films by and about women who love women. |
| LGBT+ Film Festival | Warsaw | | Poland | 2010 | Largest festival of LGBTQ cinema in Central and Eastern Europe |
| LGBT+ Film Festival | Bangkok | Bangkok Metropolitan Region | Thailand | 2018 | Curated and hosted by Bangkok Screening Room |
| Ljubljana LGBTQ Film Festival | Ljubljana | Central Slovenia | Slovenia | 1984 | Europe's oldest gay and lesbian film festival |
| Llamale H | Montevideo | | Uruguay | 2006 | |
| London Lesbian Film Festival | London | Ontario | Canada | 1991 | |
| Lovers Film Festival - Torino LGBTQI Visions | Turin | Piedmont | Italy | 1986 | |
| Macao International Queer Film Festival | Macao | Macao | Macao | 2023 | Marks the first LGBTQIA+ related festival in Macao. |
| Making Scenes Film and Video Festival | Ottawa | Ontario | Canada | 1992 | Defunct in 2005; replaced with Ottawa edition of Inside Out. |
| Mardi Gras Film Festival | Sydney | New South Wales | Australia | 1993 | |
| Massimadi Festival | Montreal | Quebec | Canada | 2009 | Centres on film and art relating to LGBTQ issues in the Black/African diaspora |
| Mawjoudin Queer Film Festival | Tunis | Tunis | Tunisia | 2018 | |
| Melbourne Queer Film Festival | Melbourne | Victoria | Australia | 1991 | |
| Merlinka Festival | Belgrade, Novi Sad, Sarajevo, Tuzla, Podgorica | Former Yugoslavia | Serbia, Bosnia and Herzegovina, Montenegro | 2009 | Only queer film festival that is organized in several countries. |
| Mezipatra | Brno and Prague | Moravia and Bohemia | Czech Republic | 2000 | |
| MICGénero | Mexico City | State of Mexico | Mexico | 2011 | |
| Milwaukee LGBTQ Film & Video Festival | Milwaukee | Wisconsin | United States | 1987 | |
| MIX Copenhagen | Copenhagen | Copenhagen Metropolitan Area | Denmark | 1986 | |
| MIX NYC | New York City | New York | United States | 1987 | |
| Movida Gay | | | Cuba | 2007 | |
| Muestra Internacional de Cine Diversex Nicaragua | Managua, León, Jinotepe, Masaya, Matagalpa, Granada and others | | Nicaragua | 2008 | |
| Muskoka Queer Film Festival | Bracebridge, Huntsville | Ontario | Canada | 2020 | Launched online during the COVID-19 pandemic following the cancellation of its planned live inaugural edition |
| National Queer Arts Festival | San Francisco | California | United States | 1998 | |
| NewFest | New York City | New York | United States | 1988 | |
| North Carolina Gay & Lesbian Film Festival | Durham | North Carolina | United States | 1995 | |
| Notre Dame Queer Film Festival | Notre Dame | Indiana | United States | 2004 | |
| Oslo/Fusion International Film Festival | Oslo | | Norway | | |
| OUTeast Film Festival | Halifax | Nova Scotia | Canada | 2012 | |
| Out in Africa | Johannesburg and Cape Town | Gauteng and Western Cape | South Africa | 1994 | |
| Out and Loud Pune International Queer Film Festival | Pune | Maharashtra | India | 2017 | |
| Out North Queer Film Festival | Whitehorse | Yukon | Canada | 2012 | |
| Out on Film | Atlanta | Georgia | United States | 1987 | |
| Out Takes: A Reel Queer Film Festival | Auckland and Wellington | Auckland Region and Wellington Region | New Zealand | 1995 | The last festival was held in 2014. |
| Outburst Queer Arts Festival Belfast | Belfast | Northern Ireland | United Kingdom | 2007 | |
| Outfest | Los Angeles | California | United States | 1982 | |
| OutfestPerú | Lima | | Peru | 2004 | |
| OutLove International Film Festival | Fort Myers | Florida | United States | 2020 | |
| Outview Film Festival | Athens | Greece | Greece | 2007 | |
| Paris Lesbian and Feminist Film Festival | Paris | France | France | 1989 | Women-only film festival featuring films by and about lesbians and feminism |
| Pink Life QueerFest | Istanbul | Turkey | Turkey | 2011 | |
| Philadelphia QFest | Philadelphia | Pennsylvania | United States | 1996 | |
| Pink Apple | Zürich and Frauenfeld | Canton of Zürich and Canton of Thurgau | Switzerland | 1997 | |
| Pink Lobster Film Festival | Fredericton | New Brunswick | Canada | 2017 | |
| Pink Screens | Brussels | Brussels | Belgium | 2002 | |
| Pride Asian Film Festival | Toronto | Ontario | Canada | 2025 | |
| Pride International Film Festival | Manila | Metro Manila | Philippines | 2004 | Films specialising in HIV and AIDS awareness |
| Puerto Rico Queer Filmfest | San Juan | Puerto Rico | United States | | |
| Q! Film Festival | Jakarta | Greater Jakarta (Jabodetabek) | Indonesia | 2002 | Asia's largest LGBTQ film festival, and the first in a predominantly Muslim country. It was established in 2002 and closed in early 2017. |
| QFest | Houston | Texas | United States | 1997 | |
| Queer City Cinema | Regina | Saskatchewan | Canada | 1996 | |
| Queer Film Festival | Berlin, Cologne, Dresden, Düsseldorf, Frankfurt am Main, Fürstenwalde, Halle (Saale), Leipzig, Magdeburg, Munich, Nuremberg, Stuttgart & Vienna | Baden-Württemberg, Bavaria, Berlin, Brandenburg, Hesse, North Rhine-Westphalia, Saxony, Saxony-Anhalt, Vienna | Germany; Austria | | |
| Queer Film Festival Oldenburg | Oldenburg | Niedersachsen | Germany | 2010 | |
| Queer Kampala International Film Festival | Kampala | | Uganda | | |
| Queer Lisboa International Queer Film Festival | Lisbon | Lisbon metropolitan area | Portugal | 1997 | |
| Queer Media Festival | Manchester | Greater Manchester | United Kingdom | | |
| Queer North Film Festival | Sudbury | Ontario | Canada | 2016 | |
| QUEER-Streifen Regensburg | Regensburg | Bavaria | Germany | 2012 | |
| Queer Vision Film Festival | Bristol | South West England | United Kingdom | | |
| Queer Voices: NYC Film Festival | New York City | New York | United States | 2023 | Queer Voices: NYC is focused on centering and celebrating LGBTQIA+ filmmakers of color. |
| Queersicht | Bern | Canton of Bern | Switzerland | 1997 | |
| Rainbow Film Festival | Shrewsbury | Shropshire | United Kingdom | | |
| RainbowQC Pride Film Festival | Quezon City | | Philippines | 2025 | Put on by the QCinema International Film Festival |
| Rainbow Reel Tokyo | Tokyo | Greater Tokyo Area | Japan | 1992 | 'Rainbow Reel Tokyo' is the official new name for the 'Tokyo International Lesbian & Gay Film Festival' (since 2016). |
| Rainbow Reels Queer and Trans Film Festival | Kitchener-Waterloo | Ontario | Canada | 2001 | |
| Rainbow Visions Film Festival | Edmonton | Alberta | Canada | 2015 | |
| Reel Affirmations | Washington, D.C. | District of Columbia | United States | 1991 | |
| Reel Out Charlotte | Charlotte | North Carolina | United States | 2008 | 'Reel Out Charlotte' is the new name for 'GayCharlotte Film Festival' (since 2018). |
| Reel Pride | Winnipeg | Manitoba | Canada | 1985 | |
| Reel Pride | Fresno | California | United States | 1989 | |
| Reelout Queer Film Festival | Kingston | Ontario | Canada | 1999 | |
| Reeling | Chicago | Illinois | United States | 1981 | |
| Rio LGBTQIA+ Festival Internacional de Cinema | Rio de Janeiro | Rio de Janeiro | Brazil | 1995 | Originally known as Rio Festival Gay de Cinema, the festival adopted its new name in 2016. Rio LGBTQIA+ Film Festival is the new title of the festival. |
| RO Q DOC | Bucharest | | Romania | | |
| Roze Filmdagen | Amsterdam | | Netherlands | 1996 | |
| San Francisco Transgender Film Festival | San Francisco | California | United States | 1997 | Originally named 'Tranny Fest' |
| Santo Domingo Outfest | | | Dominican Republic | 2010 | |
| Screened Out | Cablecast film festival | Nationwide cablecast | United States | 2007 only | |
| SQIFF | Glasgow | Scotland | United Kingdom | 2015 | |
| Seattle Queer Film Festival | Seattle | Washington | United States | 1996 | Suspended in 2026 |
| Seattle Trans Underground Film Festival (STUFF) | Seattle | Washington | United States | 2025 | |
| Shanghai Queer Film Festival | Shanghai | Shanghai (municipality) | China | 2017 | |
| ShanghaiPRIDE Film Festival | Shanghai | Shanghai (municipality) | China | 2015 | Originated from ShanghaiPRIDE film screening nights. |
| Sicilia Queer filmfest | Palermo | Sicily | Italy | 2010 | International & New Visions filmfest |
| Side by Side | Saint Petersburg | Saint Petersburg ('Federal Subject') | Russia | 2008 | |
| Slovak Queer Film Festival | Bratislava | | Slovakia | | |
| Sunny Bunny (film festival) | Kyiv | | Ukraine | 2023 | First Ukrainian LGBTQ film festival, expansion of an existing program within Kyiv International Film Festival "Molodist" |
| Taiwan International Queer Film Festival | Taipei and Taichung | Taipei–Keelung Metropolitan Area and Taichung-Changhua Metropolitan Area | Taiwan (R.O.C) | 2014 | |
| Tampa International Gay and Lesbian Film Festival | Tampa | Florida | United States | 1989 | |
| Tels Quel Festival | Brussels | | Belgium | | |
| Thessaloniki International G.L.A.D. Film Festival (LGBTI+) | Thessaloniki | | Greece | 1998 | |
| TLVFest | Tel Aviv | Gush Dan | Israel | 2006 | |
| Toronto Queer Film Festival | Toronto | Ontario | Canada | 2016 | |
| TranScreen Filmfestival Amsterdam | Amsterdam | Netherlands | Netherlands | 2011 | |
| Transition International Queer Minorities Film Festival | Vienna | | Austria | | |
| Translations: The Seattle Transgender Film Festival | Seattle | Washington | United States | 2006 | Suspended in 2025 |
| Vancouver Queer Film Festival | Vancouver | British Columbia | Canada | 1988 | |
| Vinokino | Turku and Helsinki | Southwest Finland (or 'Finland Proper') and Uusimaa (or 'Nyland') | Finland | 1991 | |
| Way OUT West Film Fest | Albuquerque | New Mexico | United States | 2003 | |
| Wicked Queer | Boston | Massachusetts | United States | 1984 | Formerly known as the Boston LGBTQ Film Festival |
| West Pride | Gothenburg | Metropolitan Gothenburg | Sweden | 2007 | |
| XPOSED Queer Film Festival | Berlin | Berlin | Germany | 2006 | |
| Zinegoak | Bilbao | | Spain | 2004 | |
| Queer Indie Film and Lit Fest (QIFLIF) | Hyderabad | Telangana | India | 2024 | |
| Holebifilmfestival | Leuven (primarily) | Vlaams-Brabant | Belgium | 2001 | |
