= Bao Hongwei =

British-Chinese academic (born 1977)

- 包宏偉
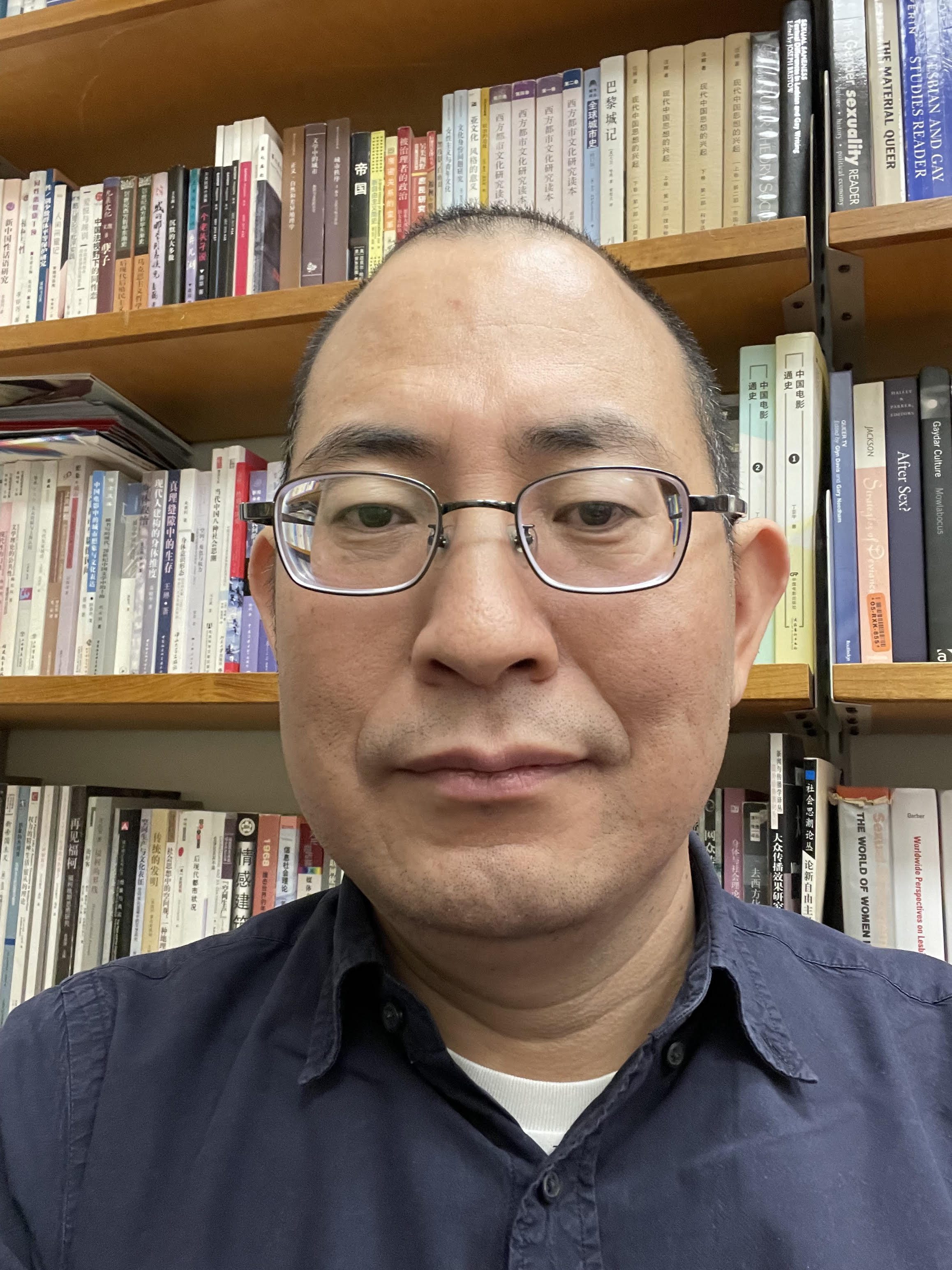
- Born: August 1977 (age 48); Shaanxi, China
- Occupation: Associate Professor of Media Studies at the University of Nottingham
- Years active: 2002 - Present
- Known for: Intersectional work in Asian studies and queer studies
- Notable work: Queer Comrades: Gay Identity and Queer Politics in Postsocialist China Queer China: Lesbian and Gay Literature and Visual Culture under Postsocialism Queer Media in China Contemporary Chinese Queer Performance Queering the Asian Diaspora: East and Southeast Asian Sexuality, Identity and Cultural Politics

Bao Hongwei (English: /bɑʊ̯ː hʊŋˈweɪ/; Chinese: 包宏偉; pinyin: Bāo Hóngwěi, pronounced [paʊ xʊŋ.weɪ], born August 1977) is a British Chinese scholar at the intersection of Asian studies and queer studies, sometimes focusing more specifically on the intersection of Chinese studies and queer studies. His name is often printed and written as Hongwei Bao, following the structural conventions of an English name. He is employed at the University of Nottingham, where he works as a Faculty of Arts Associate Professor in Media Studies. He has written and co-edited numerous academic works and also writes poetry.

His commentary has been cited by multiple Wikipedia articles such as LGBTQ culture in Shanghai, Shitou (activist), Shanghai Queer Film Festival, and others. He has contributed his opinion to major news outlets such as The New York Times, The Guardian, The Economist, South China Morning Post, Times Higher Education, and the Australian Broadcasting Corporation, among others. He is a Fellow of the Royal Asiatic Society of Great Britain and Ireland, as well as a Fellow of Advance HE.

== Early life and education ==
Bao was born in the Shaanxi province and grew up in Inner Mongolia in the People's Republic of China. He attended Xi'an International Studies University from 1996 to 2000, receiving his Bachelor of Arts degree in English. He then attended Peking University from 2000 to 2002, receiving a second BA in International and Intercultural Communication. He studied at Nanjing University from 2002 to 2003, where he obtained a certificate in American Studies. He later returned to Peking University from 2004 to 2006, where he obtained a certificate in Art History and Theory. Bao then pursued his PhD at the University of Sydney, where he received a doctoral degree in Gender and Cultural Studies. From 2014 to 2017, he studied for and obtained a Postgraduate Certificate in Higher Education from the University of Nottingham, where he now works.

== Impact on Asian, Chinese, and queer studies ==
Dr. Bao's work has been well-received by critics, many of whom have cited its impact on his fields. Dr. Jiangtao Harry Gu in The Journal of Asian Studies complimented Bao's aptitude for illuminating the complexities of the many different aspects of queer Chinese media and how they relate to one another, calling Queer Media in China an "extraordinary work of cultural translation." Dr. Jamie J. Zhao, reviewing the same book, complimented Bao's inclusiveness of groups in the margins, specifically queer women, calling it an "important academic source in queer Chinese studies." Reviewing Queer China: Lesbian and Gay Literature and Visual Culture Under Postsocialism, Ting Guo in Critical Arts highlighted how Bao takes a unique and fresh angle in portraying how queer life and culture in China is positioned within the political sphere. Feminist Encounters praised the thoroughness of Bao's examination, calling the book a "wonderful and timely contribution to the studies of art, film, media."

Complimenting Contemporary Chinese Queer Performance, Dr. Alexa Alice Joubin in Chinese Literature and Thought Today pointed out Bao's tight grasp of the relevant theories and his approach in ensuring his work was "thoroughly up-to-date." Dr. Lisa Rofel at UC Santa Cruz appreciated how groundbreaking Queer Comrades: Gay Identity and Tongzhi Activism in Postsocialist China was, highlighting Bao's unique perspective. Bao's poetry has also been praised, with Dr. Gregory Woods, the author of A History of Gay Literature: The Male Tradition, calling The Passion of the Rabbit God a "brilliant, liberating debut." Bao received the 2nd Plaza Prize in Microfiction in 2023 for his work A Postcard from Berlin.

Bao's co-edited work has also received acclaim. Dr. Chris Berry of King's College London commented that the legacy of the Routledge Handbook of Chinese Gender & Sexuality would be enduring. The China Quarterly called Contemporary Queer Chinese Art a "major achievement for the study of Queer art in China." Dr. Ari Heinrich of the Australian National University predicted that Queer Literature in the Sinosphere would "become required reading in classrooms centering LGBTQ material from around the world." Dr. Tina Steiner of Stellenbosch University claimed that Entanglements and Ambivalences: Africa and China Encounters in Media and Culture was a significant addition to the literature and praised the way in which the co-editors, Bao included, were able to illuminate the complexities of relations between Africa and China. Kimiko Suda of WagREV called Queer/Tongzhi China: New Perspectives on Research, Activism and Media Cultures a "great overview" of its topic. Bao's latest work, Queering the Asian Diaspora, is forthcoming.

== Contribution of expertise to media outlets ==
Dr. Bao has offered insight and commentary to several prominent media outlets. For the New York Times, he commented on the ways in which a transgender person might receive more recognition than some gay people in Chinese media by embracing assimilation, given the pathologization of transness as it is prevalent in China and the country's embrace of surgical procedures as proper medical treatment. For The Guardian, Bao highlighted how tensions between the West and China are tied to a rise in Chinese nationalism and spoke about the dynamics between the Chinese authorities and the people at large. He also talked about the association between Chinese birth rate policies and discrimination towards LGBTQ+ people.

Bao spoke to The Economist about the ways in which Western far right language makes its way into Chinese nationalist rhetoric. He commented on how Chinese national rhetoric is inclined toward correlating homosexuality and queerness with capitalism and "bourgeois decadence" for the South China Morning Post. Bao spoke on an online ban on queer speech to Times Higher Education and its harrowing effect on communities. He talked about China's more recent silencing of activism and its impact on LGBTQ+ people for the Australian Broadcasting Corporation.
