= Taiwan International Queer Film Festival =

LGBTQ film festival in Taiwan

Taiwan International Queer Film Festival 臺灣國際酷兒影展
- Location: Taipei, Taichung, Kaohsiung in Taiwan
- Founded: 2014
- Directors: Jay Lin
- Hosted by: Taiwan International Media and Education Association
- Festival date: October
- Language: International
- Website: Official website

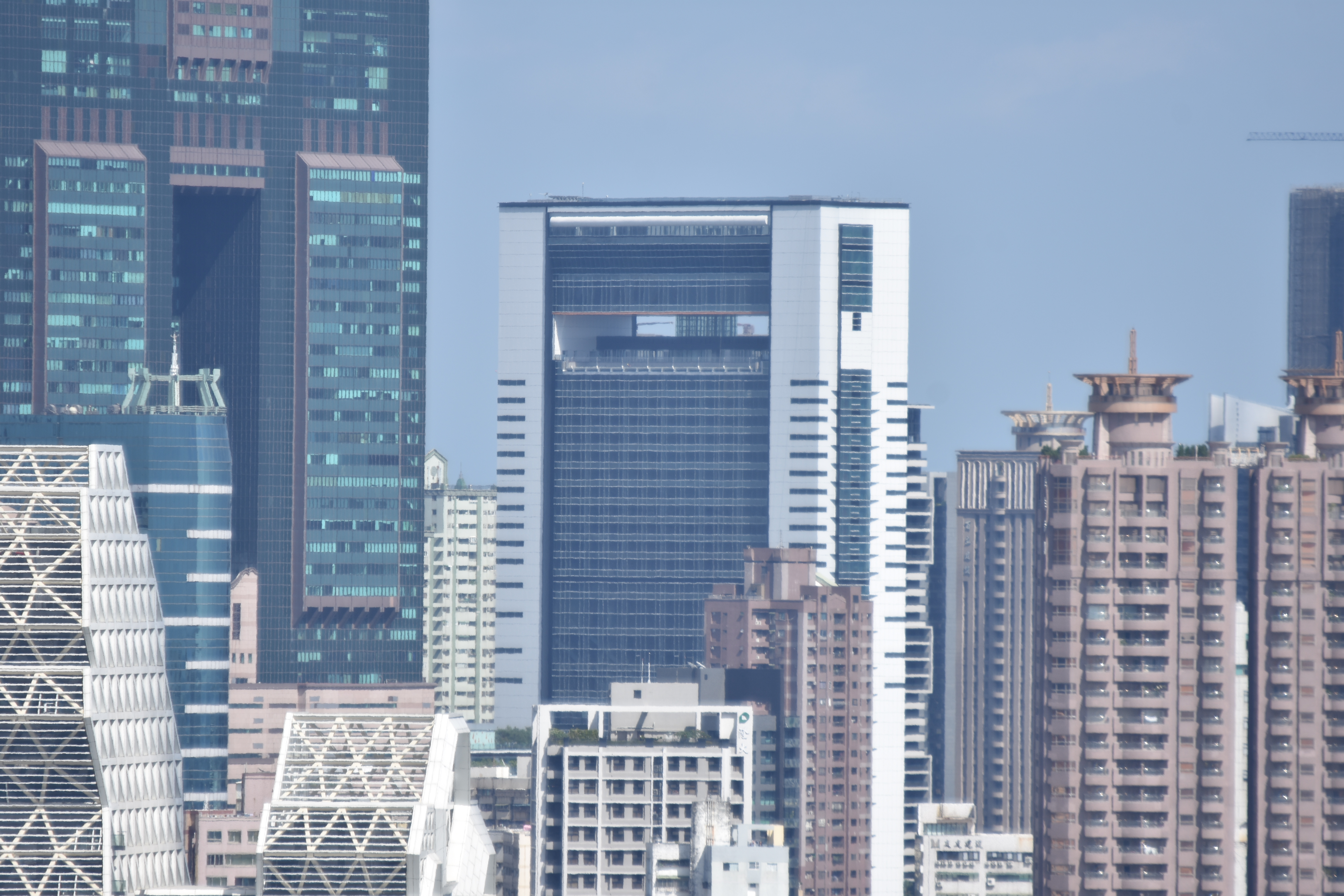
One of the main screening venues of the TIQFF: Kaohsiung Main Public Library

Taiwan International Queer Film Festival (TIQFF; Chinese: 臺灣國際酷兒影展; pinyin: Táiwān Guójì Kùer Yǐngzhǎn) is an annual LGBT film festival held each fall in Taipei, Taiwan. Other events are held in Kaoshiung and Taichung. It was founded in 2014 by the Taiwanese LGBT activist Jay Lin, and is the only LGBTQ film festival in Taiwan. Other Chinese-language LGBT film festivals in the region, which also feature international LGBT films with Chinese subtitles, include Shanghai Queer Film Festival, Beijing Queer Film Festival, CINEMQ, ShanghaiPRIDE Film Festival and Hong Kong Lesbian & Gay Film Festival.

== Background ==
Taiwan International Queer Film Festival (TIQFF) was established by its founder and Director, Jay Lin, in 2014. It is organized and hosted by the Taiwan International Media and Education Association (TIMEA).

Lin says he believes there is a global trend in the production of LGBT-related films, and in a report he produced in March 2014, found that 17 of the top 20 TV shows in the United States have gay characters or gay actors. He says that he thinks this trend will carry over to Asian-produced shows, particularly those made in Taiwan.

=== Queermosa Awards ===
In 2016, Lin worked with TIQFF to establish a film award ceremony known as the Queermosa Awards. Queermosa also uses the comparative visibility of LGBT people on US television as an example for Taiwan to follow, and cites the US figure of 271 visible LGBT characters. Queermosa states that "We might not have 271 LGBT characters on TV yet, but we should cherish what we have accomplished...". It concludes by saying that it needs to provide motivation and support to "push the often invisible niche community into acceptance and equal representation".

Lin made a video named 'We Are Everywhere', which features the difficulties he faced when he tried to come out to his parents.

== History ==
TIQFF began in 2014, and is screened annually every fall. In its opening year, it screened 60 films from 30 countries. It featured speeches from several film producers and directors, and the Taiwan Queer Awards, including a two-day workshop for local filmmakers, focussed on improving distribution and the production of LGBT content that appeals to mainstream audiences. In its second year, it screened around 100 films and included workshops with LGBT film directors including Stanley Kwan, Arvin Chen and Zero Chou. In the same year, TIQFF helped to found the Queer Film Festival Alliance, with festival directors coming from several main cities across eastern Asia. In 2016, its third year, the official international LGBT film award of the Berlin International Film Festival, known as the Teddy Award, awarded prizes at the Festival in its venues in its three host cities, during the Festival's screening weeks in October, November and December.

The film festival has emanated from pressure for gay rights in Taiwan, which were part of the political and cultural democracy movements which started in Taiwan in the 1990s and began to grow. TIQFF's view is that while LGBT events such as Taiwan's Gay Pride Parade in the early 2000s increased LGBT visibility, and were part of several "localized successes", LGBT people in Taiwan at that time still lacked a "central voice". It believes that this voice can reach out to other citizens, the government and the wider world, and that "the power of films and media can help to create this bond".

== Screening venues ==
- Taipei ShinKong Cinemas, 4th Floor, No.36, Xining S. Rd., Wanhua District, Taipei City 108, Taiwan (R.O.C.)
- Kaohsiung Public Library, 7th Floor, No.61, Xinguang Rd., Cianjhen District, Kaohsiung City 806, Taiwan (R.O.C.)
- Wonderful Cinemas, No.38, Gongyuan Rd., Central District, Taichung City 400, Taiwan (R.O.C.)

== See also ==
- List of LGBT film festivals
