= Shitou (activist) =

Chinese activist, actress, filmmaker, artist, and gay icon

Shitou (born 1969) is a Chinese activist, actress, filmmaker, multimedia artist, and gay icon. She has been active in the Chinese gay scene since the 1990s and was the first lesbian to come out on Chinese television.

== Biography ==
Shitou (石头) was born in 1969 in Guizhou to an ethnic Miao family and graduated from the Guizhou Art Academy. Shitou was a part of the Yuanmingyuan artist colony in 1992 before its dissolution in 1995. In 2000, Shitou was featured on a Hunan Satellite Television talk show program called "Approaching Homosexuality." According to scholar Hongwei Bao, this was "the first time that a self-identified... lesbian 'came out' in PRC's official media." Shitou became one of the most prominent figures for lesbian activism in China. Scholar Tingting Wei points out that while Shitou's 'coming out' was broadcast on television, cultural attitudes and the PRC viewed homosexuality as a crime and a mental disorder at the time.

In 2001 Shitou had a starring role as Xiaoling in the Chinese lesbian film Fish and Elephant. She later went on to direct several films, many in collaboration with her partner, Ming Ming. Her first was Dyke March (2002). In 2006 Shitou released the documentary/essay film Women Fifty Minutes (女人五十分钟) and in 2015 directed the film We Are Here. Shitou helped found the Beijing Queer Film Festival and the China Queer Film Festival Tour.

== Activism ==
=== 1995 United Nations Fourth World Conference on Women ===
Shitou documented the United Nations Fourth World Conference on Women in her film We Are Here (2015), co-directed by Zhao Jing (赵静). In the documentary, Shitou and Zhao Jing film and interview attendees who recount how the most controversial topic at the conference was lesbian rights, especially in the context of women's rights at this conference that took place in Beijing, China. Lesbian organizers claim that lesbian rights were not intended to be a part of the conference at all. Shitou is known for using documentary film as a tool for activism and political change, and in her film, she draws attention to lesbian rights issues and highlights how lesbian rights cannot be separated from women's rights.

As one key part of the conference, there was a Non-Governmental Organization (NGO) Forum that was scheduled. The NGO Forum was meant to take place in downtown Beijing, but instead its activities and organizers were moved to Huairou, located about 50 kilometres outside of downtown Beijing. At this location, there were seven 'diversity' tents that were set up. Lesbian organizers and international LGBT NGOs were able to set up a lesbian tent, which happened to be one of the most popular spots at the NGO Forum. The lesbian tent provided an opportunity for lesbians from China to interact and meet international lesbian organizers for the first time. During the NGO Forum, international lesbian organizers connected to host fundraising workshops, movie screenings, discuss challenges, strategies for activism, and more.

As a result of this collective organizing, lesbians were acknowledged in the United Nations conference. More than 300 people visited the lesbian tent and more than 500 people participated in the lesbian parade, where individuals and groups called for the recognition of lesbian rights. Lesbian voices were also represented and supported during the process of creating the Beijing Platform for Action/Beijing Declaration amongst government officials and international representatives.

=== Beijing Queer Film Festival ===
Both a feminist and a lesbian activist, Shitou helped to create the first Chinese gay and lesbian film festival in Beijing with collaborators Cui Zi'en and Wan Yanhai, along with the help of many other Chinese LGBT creatives. Five movies were screened at the first Beijing Queer Film Festival that took place in December 2001 on the Peking University campus, which is also known as the Beijing University campus. At the same time, alternative versions of queer movies were sourced and screened at a nearby bar. When the Public Security Bureau discovered that the film festival was happening on campus, they immediately intervened and put an end to the movie screenings.

The second time around, in April 2005, the number of movies selected for the film festival increased from 5 to 12 domestic and international films. Participants and filmmakers from Hong Kong, Taipei, Jinan, and Beijing were invited to the film festival. Once again, Chinese authorities were alerted of the film festival, and they intervened to order attendees to evacuate the premises of Peking University. However this time, key organizers like Shi Tou, Cui Zi'en, and Wan Yanhai had prepared a backup plan. Using resources and financial support from Wan Yanhai's organization, they shifted the film festival's venue to "798", an old factory that had no affiliation with the university.

In 2011, they were met with the same conditions and evacuation demands from Chinese authorities. Key organizers continued to prepare backup locations for screenings, but they soon realized that the city of Beijing was not an ideal location to host an organized LGBT film festival. After the film festivals in 2013 and 2014, the Beijing Queer Film Festival was redesigned and moved to the Institut Français Beijing. By relocating and rebranding the film festival, organizers were able to avoid government interference. Shitou and many of the original organizers are no longer directly involved with the film festival.

== Filmmaking ==
=== Method and collaborators ===
Shitou uses documentary filmmaking as a tool for social and political change, particularly in her lesbian activism. Due to limited resources as an independent filmmaker, Shitou began her filmmaking career by using non-traditional methods such as digital video technology to film her projects. These tactics were shared amongst filmmakers in the region, where they collaborated to learn how to take advantage of DV technology when there was no blockbuster budget available for independent queer filmmakers. DV technology was also widely available, cheap, and an accessible method to produce and create films.

With an educational background in the creative arts, and Shitou created many works in the fields of photography and oil painting, but when it came to filmmaking, she was self-taught. She has made three documentary films. Themes that are often found in her films include feminist and queer histories, and broader social and political issues like the loss of culture and uneven development in different regions in China, as seen in her film Women 50 Minutes (2006). In Dyke March (2002), Shitou uses her personal experience as a Chinese lesbian and a participatory approach to embody what the real-life experience is like for a lesbian.

=== Modes of production and distribution ===
State censorship was and continues to be a major barrier for queer filmmakers in China. In China, the censorship system for films means that new films must pass inspection from the Beijing Film Bureau and the State Administration of Radio, Film, and Television. Institutions and organizations within the censorship system have the power to ban queer films from being produced and they can control where and how films are released. To bypass some of the censorship laws, organizers acquired and screened pirated versions of queer films from the black market and various unofficial channels. Domestically produced Chinese queer films like Shitou’s have a better chance of reaching an international audience rather than a Chinese audience due to the strict censorship laws. Both domestically produced and illegally sourced queer films have therefore been distributed in underground channels, such as semi-organized film festivals like the Beijing Queer Film Festival.

=== Reception ===
Scholar Hongwei Bao proposes that lesbian filmmakers like Shitou were not creating documentaries and queer films with the intent of seeing commercial success for themselves; rather, they were creating films to represent themselves and to create an archival historical record of lesbian existence. Queer Chinese films were met with support and allyship from international audiences and creatives.

== Filmography ==
Shitou Filmography
Film	Year	Role
Fish and Elephant	2001	Xiaoling
Dyke March	2002	Director
Gu Wenda: Art, Politics, Life, Sexuality	2005	Director
Women Fifty Minutes	2006	Director
Gate, Mountain, River	2006	Director
Queer China, Comrade China	2008	Herself
We Are Here	2015	Director

== See also ==
- Cui Zi'en
- Wan Yanhai
- Li Yu (director)
- Wei Tingting
