= ShanghaiPRIDE Film Festival =

LGBTQ film festival in China

- Location: Shanghai, China
- Founded: 2015 (by Matthew Baren and Alvin Li)
- Hosted by: ShanghaiPRIDE
- Language: International
- Website: Official website

ShanghaiPRIDE Film Festival (ShPFF) (Chinese: 上海骄傲电影节) was an annual LGBT film festival held in Shanghai, China. It was established in 2015.

ShanghaiPRIDE Film Festival was one of three unconnected LGBT film festivals in the city. The others were Shanghai Queer Film Festival, launched in September 2017, and CINEMQ, launched in 2015.

Other Chinese-language LGBT film festivals in the region, which also feature international LGBT films with Chinese subtitles, include Beijing Queer Film Festival, Hong Kong Lesbian & Gay Film Festival and Taiwan International Queer Film Festival.

== Background ==
ShanghaiPRIDE Film Festival was established by filmmakers and people involved in the Shanghai arts scene, in conjunction with ShanghaiPRIDE, an LGBT group itself established to highlight a range of LGBT issues. ShanghaiPRIDE Film Festival was, in turn, established to create awareness and promote tolerance for the LGBT community through film. It was launched in 2015 to support new queer Chinese filmmaking talent. It hosted workshops, Q & A Sessions and panel discussions with some of the leading figures in Chinese LGBT cinema. The festival took place in June as part of ShanghaiPRIDE. Screenings were free and open to all.

== History ==
ShanghaiPRIDE had featured film screenings since it began in 2009. ShanghaiPRIDE director Raymond Phang states: "screenings were very secretive – very small-scale, with 20 or 30 people at most. You wouldn't know the venue until a few hours before." According to Variety, foreign consulates provided financial support for the screening fees of certain titles, venues, and often their own cultural section's libraries of LGBT-related titles from 2010.

A formal, fully fledged film festival was founded in 2015 by Matthew Baren and Alvin Li. Baren is a filmmaker, while Li is an art curator.

ShanghaiPRIDE Film Festival first opened from June 12–21, 2015. The first festival was themed, 'Queer Family,' and featured film screenings, including live Q & A sessions and workshops. It also featured short films from around the world, and invited submissions from Chinese LGBT filmmakers. The festival opened with the Mainland Chinese premiere of Lilting (2014) and opening night was attended by the film's star, actress Cheng Pei Pei.

The 2016 festival was held June 17–26, with the theme 'gender,' with a program of films on gender minorities. The 10 day event featured 40 films, a short film competition, workshops and panel discussions. The festival opened with the Mainland Chinese premiere of Tangerine (2015). Other highlights included a specially recorded message from Sir Ian McKellen, and a 20th anniversary screening of East Palace West Palace, attended by director Zhang Yuan.

The festival included a short film competition, for films which 'tell stories of Chinese LGBTQ experience.' According to Baren, "Film is very important to the LGBT movement in China. So much of [LGBTQ cinema] is dominated by the West. We wanted to support Chinese stories, Chinese faces." Five awards are judged by film industry professionals. Past judges have included filmmakers Hong Khaou, Quentin Lee and Kit Hung, as well as musicians Erica Lee and MIIIA.

Baren and Li departed the festival in 2016. In 2017 edition. In 2017, the festival was directed by Wing Shen as a much smaller event, taking place on two non-consecutive days. In 2019, the festival was overseen by Raymond Phang, a Malaysian who was also the overall director of ShanghaiPRIDE festival.

== See also ==
- List of LGBT film festivals
