= Abhimani Film Festival =

LGBTQ film festival in Sri Lanka

- Location: Colombo, Sri Lanka
- Founded: 2006
- Language: International
- Website: Official webpage

Abhimani Film Festival, also known as Celluloid Rainbows, is an annual LGBTIQ film festival held in Colombo, Sri Lanka. It was established in 2006, and is the only LGBTIQ film festival in Sri Lanka. The 2018 Festival begins on 18 June 2018.

== Background ==
The Abhimani Film Festival (formally known as Celluloid Rainbows), screens local and international feature and short length movies from around the world. It is the oldest LGBT Film Festival in the South Asian region and the only LGBT Film Festival in Sri Lanka. Abhimani also aims to educate all communities on daily issues faced by LGBT people.

== See also ==
- List of LGBT events
- List of LGBT film festivals
- &PROUD, Yangon, Myanmar
- Bangalore Queer Film Festival, India
- Chennai International Queer Film Festival, India
- KASHISH Mumbai International Queer Film Festival, India
