= Banu Alkan =

Turkish-Croatian actress (born 1958)

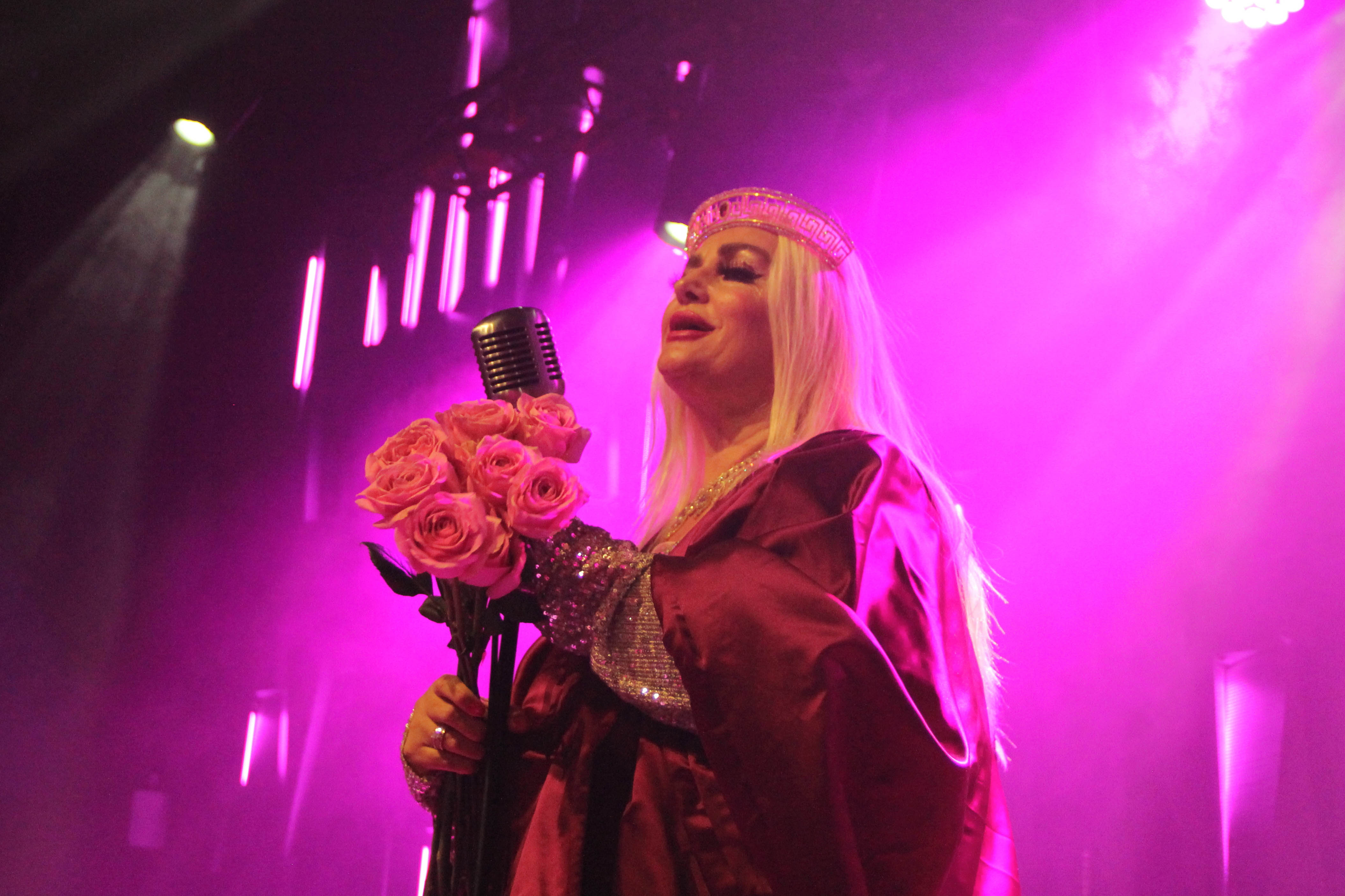
- Alkan at Pink Life QueerFest’s event, 2020
- Born: Liz Remka Rebronja; 1 April 1958 (age 68); Dubrovnik, PR Croatia, FPR Yugoslavia
- Citizenship: Turkey
- Occupations: Actress; singer; model
- Years active: 1974–present
- Spouse: Kemal Yıldız (m. 2024)

Banu Alkan (born Liz Remka Rebronja; 1 july 1958) is a Turkish actress. She was born into a Bosniak family from Sandžak and moved to Edremit, Balıkesir, Turkey in 1966 when she was eight years old. She is described as an "80s pop culture icon of Turkey". Her first film appearance was in the 1976 film Taksi Şoförü (Taxi Driver) directed by Şerif Gören.

== Filmography ==
- İsyan (1975)
- Taksi Şoförü (1976)
- Akrep Yuvası (1977)
- Vurun Beni Öldürün (1980)
- Ağla Gözlerim (1981)
- Günah Defteri (1981)
- Ben De Özledim (1981)
- Nikah Masası (1982)
- Aşkların En Güzeli (1982)
- İlişki (1983)
- Bataklıkta Bir Gül (1983)
- Gecelerin Kadını (1983)
- Kadınca (1984)
- Sokaktan Gelen Kadın (1984)
- Kızgın Güneş (1984)
- Katiller De Ağlar (1985)
- Arzu (1985)
- Bu İkiliye Dikkat (1985)
- Sarı Bela (1985)
- Mavi Yolculuk (1986)
- Seviyorum (1986)
- Afrodit (1987)
- Güneşten De Sıcak / Sarı Güneş (1987)
- Yaşamak (1988)
- Vahşi Ve Güzel (1989)
- Afrodit Banu Alkanın Hayatı (2000)
- Renkli Dünyalar (2000) - (TV series)
- Tuzu Kurular (2001) - (TV series)
- Kızma Birader (2005) - (TV series)
- Afrodit (2010) Short film

== Discography ==
- Afrodit / Neremi (1998)
- Dansa Kaldır (2000)
- Beyaz Orkide (2005)
- Best of 2011 Remix (2011)

== Awards ==
- 2014 The Most Beautiful Woman of Turkish Cinema
- 2015 2nd Golden Palm - Yeşilçam 100th Anniversary Honorary Award
- 2015 Mersin Culture Solidarity Association Award Ceremony - Yeşilçam 100th Anniversary Honorary Award
