= Shitou (disambiguation) =

Shitou (simplified Chinese: 石头; traditional Chinese: 石頭) may refer to:

- Stone City, ancient fortified city within Nanjing
- Shitou Xiqian, 8th-century Chinese Zen Buddhist teacher and author
- Shitou, Lujiang County, town in Lujiang County, Anhui
- Shitou, Rong County, Guangxi, town in Rong County, Guangxi
- Shitou, Chinese actress, director, filmmaker, and lesbian activist
