= Toronto Queer Film Festival =

LGBTQ film festival in Ontario, Canada

- Established: 2016
- Directors: Nedda Ibrahim
- Festival date: Opening: October 16, 2026; Closing: October 18, 2026
- Website: torontoqueerfilmfest.com

The Toronto Queer Film Festival is an LGBT film festival held annually in Toronto, Ontario, Canada. Launched in 2016 by a collective of artists and activists who perceived the programming of the city's established Inside Out Film and Video Festival to be too mainstream and commercialized, the event stages a program of independent feature and short films and videos over several days in the fall of each year, focusing primarily on works created from an alternative or activist perspective.

The event is staged primarily on the campus of OCAD University, with some screenings also taking place at the Art Gallery of Ontario's Jackman Hall.

As a result of the COVID-19 pandemic in Toronto, the festival launched the Queer Emergencies Fund to offer grants to LGBT filmmakers for the creation of new short works.
