= Queersicht =

Queersicht is a LGBTIAQ+ film festival held in Bern, Switzerland. Founded in 1997, it is the oldest film festival for LGBTIAQ+ movies in Switzerland. Originally founded in the autonomous youth and culture center Reitschule in Bern, it is today an independent association. The festival is organized by a volunteer committee and funded by the city and canton of Bern and different private sponsors. The festival attracts about 3,000 spectators each year. Due to COVID the 25th anniversary had to be postponed to 2022.

The name is a pun on the words queer and quer, which means across in German. The name could thus be loosely translated as "crossview".

== See also ==
- List of LGBT film festivals
