= DOTYK (film festival) =

DOTYK Queer Film Festival
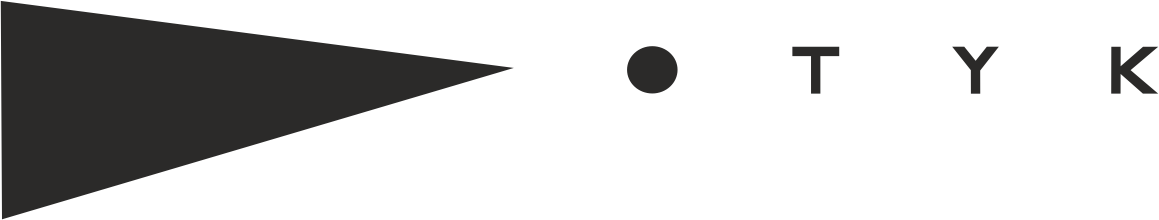
- Location: Belarus (Minsk, Hrodna, Brest, Vitsebsk)
- Language: international
- Website: dotyk.by

DOTYK (Belarusian: Дотык – The Touch) is an international annual festival of queer culture. Its goal is to enlarge the knowledge about existing discrimination, to touch upon topical issues such as identity and self-expression, to attract attention to the problem of the different kinds of xenophobia in Belarusian society, to encourage the consolidation between discriminated people, to increase their self-awareness, and to enhance the capacity of the audience for self-reflection.

== History ==
DOTYK emerged from To Be. Queer (Быць. Квір) initiative in the beginning of 2015. To Be. Queer was a voluntary, spontaneous and flexible unity of initiatives. It served as a discussion and ideological consolidation space for activists, researchers and parties interested in issues of discrimination. By the beginning of 2015, To Be. Queer had ceased to exist and DOTYK began.

Initially DOTYK was planned as a film festival, accompanied by different events and held once a year, existing for the purpose of reflection upon experience of discriminated and oppressed social groups. The first DOTYK took place between 20 February – 1 March 2015 and it included the run of documentary, animation and feature films, the holding of exhibitions, lectures, workshops, concerts and meetings with Belarusian and foreign guests. But later the agenda of the festival has been changed in many different ways. DOTYK outgrew the limits of a cinema festival and began to unify various forms of expression, became a festival of queer culture, took place in different venues, and appeared in cities other than the capital. The first Wandering DOTYK (Вандроўны DOTYK) was held in Brest, Vitsebsk and Hrodna.

== Format ==
Currently DOTYK's team is aiming at regular organization of cultural and educational events in Minsk and regions of Belarus. Moreover, DOTYK collaborates with artists regardless of the level of their publicity and experience as well as creates art projects that are applicable to Belarusian context. DOTYK builds communication based not on the academic language, but on the language of art which is a universal language of humanity. It show living stories and does not simplify them to statistics, it demonstrates the complexity and diversity of the world, its omnipresent variety.

== Principles and values ==
DOTYK's values are based upon principles of anti-discrimination in the wide sense of the notion, whereas 'queer' notion can serve as a category of reality analyses and social norms critics, whatever it is related to. DOTYK does its best at spreading awareness of anti-human character of any discrimination and marginalization of social groups with a belief that human differences do not exclude the possibility of peaceful and mutually respectful co-existence. DOTYK strongly opposes xenophobia, chauvinism, racism, sexism, homo-, trans- and biphobia, militarism, colonialism and other forms of social depreciation.

The activities of DOTYK are aimed at Belarusian offline environment. This explains one of the DOTYK's top priorities that is to create secure discussion spaces for knowledge and experience exchange. Another aim is to consolidate people with similar experience of social rejection, who feel lonely and are politically, culturally or socially invisible. It's important as well for DOTYK to fill in the gaps related to exclusion of LGBTQIA-people and other discriminated social groups from the world art history.

The internal structure of DOTYK is both horizontal and flexible. DOTYK builds communication using the language of liberal arts as it is a universal human language that shows true stories, not diminished to statistical data, for it reflects world's complexity and diversity.

== See also ==
- List of LGBT film festivals
