= Lisa Rofel =

American anthropologist

- Known for: Anthropology of China, post-socialism, gender and sexuality

Academic background
- Education: Brown University (BA); Stanford University (PhD)
- Thesis: Eating out of one big pot: Hegemony and resistance in a Chinese factory (1989)
- Doctoral advisor: Sylvia Yanagisako

Academic work
- Discipline: Anthropology
- Institutions: University of California, Santa Cruz

Lisa Rofel is an American anthropologist, specialising in feminist anthropology and gender studies. She received a B.A. from Brown University, followed by an M.A. and Ph.D. from Stanford University, and is now professor emirata at the University of California, Santa Cruz. Rofel's publications include Desiring China: Experiments in Neoliberalism, Sexuality, and Public Culture, and Other Modernities: Gendered Yearnings in China after Socialism.

== Publications ==
=== Desiring China ===
Desiring China "examines the ways in which analyses of public culture in China offer new ways to read desire", and was described by Patti Duncan in the NWSA Journal as "an exciting and important new work that pushes the boundaries of ethnography". Yan Hairong, writing in The Journal of Asian Studies, endorsed Rofel's thesis as "an innovative ethnographic strategy", but commented that desire could be linked not only to culture, but also to political and economic interests. In The China Quarterly, Tiantian Zheng commented that although Desiring China "makes a significant contribution to understanding the construction of post-socialist subjects in China", it bases its argument on a theorised audience without "grounded interviews" as evidence that such an audience actually exists.

=== Other Modernities ===
Other Modernities studies three generations of female silk workers in a factory in Hangzhou, comparing the social attitudes of each generation - those who entered work during the Chinese Communist Revolution, those who grew up during the Cultural Revolution, and those who grew up during the reign of Deng Xiaoping. Emily Chao, reviewing the book for Anthropological Quarterly, described it as "a theoretically sophisticated yet broadly accessible account which combines an analysis of narrative based on cultural and historical specificities, and on the politics of representation, with a reflexive interrogation of western representations of Chinese women and China; beginning with views formerly held by Rofel herself". Mary Gallagher, in The China Journal, took issue with a lack of coverage of labour issues, saying that "Wage differentials, differences in welfare benefits between contract and permanent workers, and the implementation of new incentive policies, for example, seem from Rofel's narrative to play little role in the way workers view their work, their fellow workers, or factory management".
