= Fan Popo =

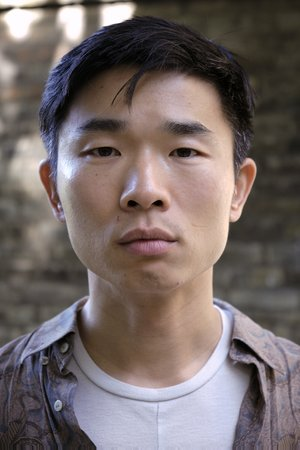
Fan Popo, in 2021

Fan Popo (Chinese: 范坡坡, born in November 1985) is a Chinese filmmaker, film critic, and LGBT activist. Fan's documentaries have focused on performance-based activism (New Beijing, New Marriage, and The VaChina Monologues) and coming out as LGBT in the Chinese filial context (Chinese Closet and Papa Rainbow). He is known for the documentary Mama Rainbow and his well-publicized legal case against the Chinese state media regulator over censorship of it.

== Early life ==
Fan was born in November 1985 in Shandong, China. He studied at Beijing Film Academy. After a movie night with a homophobic classmate, he realised the potential of film as a tool for LGBT rights. He attended the 2nd Beijing Queer Film Festival in 2005, where he witnessed the authorities shut it down. He said of the incident, "I felt very angry, I felt I should do something to change this." These two events turned him toward activist filmmaking.

== Career ==
Fan belongs to the dGeneration, a loose category of Chinese filmmakers who have established themselves through digital video. He is one of a relatively small number of prominent Chinese filmmakers whose output focuses on LGBT characters and topics, although he has expressed discomfort with being labelled a queer filmmaker (and with labels in general). His work has been noted alongside that of He Xiaopei and Cui Zi'en for its "direct queer aesthetic", with an approach that is "media savvy, entangled with the global LGBT movement and advocates acceptance of queer people in a more open and diverse society".

He published Happy Together: Complete Record of a Hundred Queer Films (Beifang Wenyi Press) in 2007. It was the first book of its kind to be published in mainland China. The book's profits enabled him to buy his first digital video camera.

In 2009 he co-directed New Beijing, New Marriage with David Zheng. Shot on Qianmen Street in Beijing, the film documents the first of what would become an annual action to promote same-sex marriage in China. The film represents an important milestone in the Chinese LGBT movement.

Fan documented theater groups who staged versions of The Vagina Monologues around China in 2013. The resulting film, The VaChina Monologues, shows the "many ways in which [The Vagina Monologues] has played a vital role in giving people courage to find their voice."

He is currently based in Berlin, Germany.

=== Mama Rainbow and legal case ===
Mama Rainbow was produced in association with PFLAG China, a Guangzhou-based organisation run by Ah Qiang. Fan met Quian at an emerging leaders program in 2008. The film follows six mothers ("one for each color of the rainbow flag") from PFLAG chapters as they spend time with their adult gay and lesbian children. It explores the potential for change in traditional Chinese attitudes around filial obligation. The film was posted online in China, where it attracted a large number of views and generated significant discussion among netizens. It screened atFrameline, Outfest, Kashish Mumbai Queer Film Festival and Hong Kong Lesbian & Gay Film Festival.

In December 2014, Mama Rainbow suddenly disappeared from Chinese streaming sites. Fan was told by streaming sites Youku Tudou and 56.com that they had removed the film at the request of the State Administration of Press, Publication, Radio, Film and Television (SAPPRFT). Fan made an official inquiry to SAPPRFT in February 2015, but the media regulator responded that it had no record of making such a request. Fan filed a lawsuit against them in September 2015, an action that was widely reported by international media. In December 2015, Beijing No.1 Intermediate People's Court ruled that SAPPRFT was correct in stating that it had not released any document calling for the film to be taken down. The case was seen as an important victory by LGBT activists. "I still think the verdict is to my advantage, because now knowing the agency did not release any document, I can require the video sites to put my film back," Fan stated at the time. As of October 2018, the film had not been restored. Fan has continued to be vocal about censorship of his work; he spoke out against Facebook for removing queer content.

=== Beijing Queer Film Festival ===
Fan is a board member of Beijing LGBT Center and Beijing Queer Film Festival (BJQFF). His is credited for his role in revitalizing BJQFF in the face of more intense crackdowns by the state.

== Reception ==
Fan's films have screened at festivals and academic conferences around the world. They include Vancouver International Film Festival, Berlinale, Frameline and Outfest. He was the recipient of the 2012 PRISM Award at Hong Kong Lesbian and Gay Film Festival.

He was included on Advocate magazine's 40 Under 40 list in 2014.

Despite being one of the most visible faces of China's LGBT community, Fan has spoken about the difficulties of being open about his own sexuality early in his career. "I was making films about people coming out, but I hadn't come out myself yet. I guess making these films I got to see various strategies for coming out so I planned it quite carefully. That helped smooth things a bit, but even then it took two months for my parents to accept it. It was quite tough in the beginning."

He participated in Berlinale Talents in 2017 and has been invited to be in the jury of Teddy Award in 2019.

== Filmography ==
- New Beijing, New Marriage (新前门大街, 2009, co-directed by David Zhang)
- Chinese Closet (2009)
- Be A Woman (舞娘, 2011)
- Mama Rainbow (彩虹伴我心, 2012)
- The VaChina Monologues (来自阴道, 2013)
- Papa Rainbow (彩虹伴我行, 2016)
- The Drum Tower (2019)
- Floss (2019)
- Beer! Beer! (2020)
