= Pink Apple =

LGBTQ film festival in Switzerland

Pink Apple is the biggest gay & lesbian film festival in Switzerland and takes place every springtime in Zürich and Frauenfeld.

== History ==
In 1997 the Gay and Lesbian Film Festival Pink Apple was founded by a handful of film enthusiasts in Frauenfeld, a small city in the Canton of Thurgau in Eastern Switzerland. The Swiss ”Apple Canton“, also nicknamed ”Cider India“ because of its many apple trees, was the reason for its naming. Initially its aim was to promote the emancipation and acceptance of homosexuality in the provinces on the basis of a cultural activity. The festival was first held in 1998, showing ten films to a large crowd in the tiny Cinema Luna in Frauenfeld.

Pink Apple landed in Zurich in the wake of the lesbian and gay EuroGames held there in the year 2000. A programme with seven performances of seven films was very successful right from the start. Since then the festival has been growing continuously and the main focus is now in the "little big city" of Zurich thanks to the great public encouragement and rising demand for an annual gay and lesbian film programme. The opening of Pink Apple took place in Zurich for the first time in 2003.

In the meantime Pink Apple has become the largest lesbian and gay film festival in Switzerland. This year about 80 films are to be shown in 80 performances. The initial audience of 500 has increased more than tenfold to approximately 7,000 people in 2008. Nevertheless, the festival still takes place in its birthplace Frauenfeld as well, where a reduced programme is shown.

Pink Apple is based on a society and is an independent project. The members of the organizing committee (at present around twenty people) work on a voluntary basis.

== Awards ==
In order to encourage film making with lesbian and gay topics, a short film competition was established in 2001. Ever since, the Pink Apple Award worth 2000 Swiss Francs has been presented every year by a jury consisting of film experts. Also since 2001, the audience itself determines the most popular feature or documentary film by vote, granting it the Pink Apple Audience Award. Since 2008 a separate prize each is given to the most popular feature and to the most popular documentary film.

=== Past winners ===
Pink Apple Festival Award

- 2022: Angelina Maccarone
- 2021: Eytan Fox
- 2020: Ulrike Ottinger
- 2019: Rosa von Praunheim
- 2018: Christine Vachon
- 2017: Rob Epstein & Jeffrey Friedman
- 2016: Léa Pool
- 2015: Lionel Baier

Pink Apple Short Film Award / Kurzfilmwettbewerb

- 2022: Egúngún (Masquerade), Olive Nwosu, Nigeria 2021
- 2022: Inabitável, Enock Carvalho & Matheus Farias, Brasilien 2022 (Special Mention)
- 2021: Nattrikken, Eirik Tveiten, Norwegen 2020
- 2021: Cwch Deilen, Efa Blosse-Mason, Grossbritannien 2020 (Special Mention)
- 2020: Hey You, Jared Watmuff, Grossbritannien 2019
- 2020: Min värld i dim, Jenifer Malmqvist, Schweden 2019 (Special Mention)
- 2019: Mrs McCutcheon, John Sheedy, Australien 2017
- 2019: Three Centimetres, Lara Zeidan, Grossbritannien, Libanon 2018 (Special Mention)
- 2018: Calamity, Séverine De Streyker & Maxime Feyers, Belgien 2017
- 2018: Malik, Nathan Carli, Frankreich 2018 (Special Mention)
- 2017: Salta, Marianne Amelinckx, Venezuela 2016
- 2016: Carina, Sandra Concepción Reynoso Estrada, Mexico 2015
- 2016: Hole, Martin Edralin, Kanada 2014 (Special Mention)
- 2015: Black is Blue, Cheryl Dunye, USA 2014
- 2015: L’autre femme, Marie KA, Senegal 2013 (Special Mention)
- 2014: Ce n'est pas un film de Cow-boys, Benjamin Parent, Frankreich 2012
- 2014: Ett sista farväl, Casper Andreas, Schweden 2013 (Special Mention)
- 2013: It's Consuming Me, Kai Stänicke, Deutschland 2012
- 2012: Taboulé, Richard Garcia, Spanien 2011
- 2011: Hammerhead, Sam Donovan, Grossbritannien 2009
- 2010: Almas perdidas, Julio de la Fuente, Spanien 2009
- 2009: The Island, Trevor Andersen, Kanada 2008
- 2008: No Bikini, Claudia Morgado Escanilla, Kanada 2007
- 2007: Airplanes, Jen Heck, USA 2006
- 2006: John and Michael, Shira Avni, Kanada 2004
- 2005: A Different War, Nadav Gal, Israel 2003
- 2004: Bar Talk, Cheryl Furjanic, USA 2002
- 2003: Snöchschtmol, Lawrence Grimm, Schweiz 2002
- 2002: They Still Smile, Irina Sizova, Ukraine 2002
- 2001: Kimberly, Bettina Disler, Schweiz/Australien 2000

Pink Apple Audience Award: Best Feature Film

- 2022: Nico, Eline Gehring, Deutschland 2021
- 2021: Été 85, François Ozon, Frankreich 2020
- 2020: Tu me manques, Rodrigo Bellot, Bolivien/USA 2019
- 2019: Tell It to the Bees, Annabel Jankel, Grossbritannien 2018
- 2018: Puoi baciare lo sposo, Alessandro Genovesi, Italien 2018
- 2017: In Between, Maysaloun Hamoud, Israel/Frankreich 2016
- 2016: Chez nous, Tim Oliehoek, Niederlande 2013
- 2015: While You Weren't Looking, Catherine Stewart, Südafrika 2015
- 2014: Azul y no tan Rosa, Miguel Ferrari, Venezuela 2012
- 2013: Rosie, Marcel Gisler, Schweiz 2012
- 2012: Mosquita y Mari, Aurora Guerrero, USA 2011
- 2011: Contracorriente, Javier Fuentes-Léon, Peru 2009
- 2010: The Big Gay Musical, Casper Andreas & Fred M. Caruso, USA 2009
- 2009: I Can't Think Straight, Shamim Sarif, Grossbritannien 2007
- 2008: XXY, Lucía Puenzo, Argentinien/Grossbritannien/Frankreich 2007

Pink Apple Audience Award: Best Documentary

- 2022: Nelly & Nadine, Magnus Gertten, Schweden/Belgien/Norwegen 2022
- 2021: De la cuisine au parlement – Edition 2021, Stéphane Goël, Schweiz 2021
- 2020: Uferfrauen, Barbara Wallbraun, Deutschland 2020
- 2019: Gay Chorus Deep South, David Charles Rodrigues, USA 2019
- 2018: Chavela, Catherine Gund & Daresha Kyi, USA 2017
- 2017: Strike A Pose, Ester Gould, Reijer Zwaan, Niederlande/Belgien 2016
- 2016: She's Beautiful When She's Angry, Mary Dore, USA 2014
- 2015: My Child, Can Candan, Türkei 2013
- 2014: Kein Zickenfox, Kerstin Polte und Dagmar Jäger, Deutschland 2014
- 2013: Call Me Kuchu, Malika Zouhali-Worrall und Katherine Fairfax Wright, USA 2012
- 2012: Vito, Jeffrey Schwarz, USA 2011
- 2011: Due volte genitori, Claudio Cipelleti, Italien 2009
- 2010: Edie & Thea: A Very Long Engagement, Greta Olafsdottir & Susan Muska, USA 2009
- 2009: Zanzibar Soccer Queens, Florence Ayisi, Grossbritannien 2007
- 2008: Football Under Cover, Ayat Najafi & David Assmann, Deutschland 2008

Pink Apple Audience Award: Best Film

- 2007: Imagine Me and You, Ol Parker, Grossbritannien/Deutschland 2005
- 2006: Paper Dolls, Tomer Heymann, Israel/Schweiz 2005
- 2005: Beautiful Boxer, Ekachai Uekrongtham, Thailand 2003
- 2004: D.E.B.S., Angela Robinson, USA 2003
- 2003: Ruthie and Connie: Every Room in the House, Deborah Dickson, USA 2001
- 2002: La parade (Notre histoire), Lionel Baier, Schweiz 2001
- 2001: Trembling Before G-d, Sandi Sima Dubowski, USA/Israel 2000

== See also ==
- List of LGBT film festivals
