= SQIFF =

LGBTQ film festival in Scotland

- Formation: 2014
- Headquarters: Glasgow, Scotland
- Website: https://www.sqiff.org

SQIFF (Scottish Queer International Film Festival) is Scotland's only active dedicated LGBTQIA+ film festival.

Created in 2014, with a series of one off screenings, the festival launched fully in 2015 and became an annual event. The festival arose in response to the amount of queer filmmaking activity in Glasgow, but quickly established an International programme featuring submissions from around the world. It seeks to provide a platform for LGBTQIA+ creativity, as well as challenging barriers to access.

SQIFF's goal is to get people watching, talking about, and making more queer films. They want to screen movies that people might not otherwise get a chance to see and create inspiring and informative events across Scotland. Moreover, SQIFF want to support marginalised groups within the LGBTQIA+ community by providing a networking system for queer filmmakers, as well as filmmaking workshops for audiences wanting to start on the medium. They want to challenge inequalities and barriers to accessing the arts.

== Festival ==
The first edition of SQIFF took place between 24–27 September 2015 at the Centre for Contemporary Arts, which has continued to operate as the main festival hub. Additional screenings have taken place at venues across the city. These have included: Glasgow Film Theatre, Scottish Youth Theatre, Kinning Park Complex, Glasgow School of Art, and The Space.

To connect queer audiences during the Covid-19 pandemic, SQIFF launched Sqifflex, an online platform hosting a collection of LGBTQIA+ films for free, during May and June 2020.

The Festival Co-ordinator was Helen Wright, until 2021. Helen co-founded the festival with Marc David Jacobs and Asten Holmes-Elliott. A new programming team started in 2021, introducing Nat Lall and Jamie Rea as Curators, with Indigo Korres as Programme Coordinator.

== SQIFF on Tour ==
SQIFF has also had tours around Scotland, with the most recent being the Trans-Generational Tour from March until June 2023, bringing three screenings focused on trans joy, family, history and intergenerational communities to six venues across Scotland. The venues were Eden Court (Inverness), MacRobert Arts Centre (Stirling), Glasgow Film Theatre (Glasgow), Cornucopia Unit 4 (Hawick), Dundee Contemporary Arts (Dundee), and An Lanntair (Stornoway).

== Accessibility ==
SQIFF modelled a sliding scale 'pay what you can' ticket tier scheme (FREE - £16), inspired by other grassroots festivals, which has since been implemented by Scottish festivals. Descriptive Subtitles was required for all films, and the Festival has a captioning team to assist in this. Events are BSL interpreted. Venues must be wheelchair accessible. Quiet rooms were also available at some spaces. There is an access fund to help people attend.

== See also ==
List of LGBT film festivals
