= Muskoka Queer Film Festival =

LGBTQ film festival in Ontario, Canada

The Muskoka Queer Film Festival is an annual LGBTQ film festival, staged in the Muskoka Region of the Canadian province of Ontario.

The festival was staged for the first time in 2020, by a partnership between the Muskoka Pride committee and local film production firm Sanctuary Studios. Due to the COVID-19 pandemic in Canada, its planned physical screenings were cancelled, and the event instead launched as an online festival. The second event in 2021 was again screened online. The third event in 2022 was also screened online. All events were conducted on a pay what you can model.

== Awards ==
=== 2020 ===
- Audience Choice Award: Ayaneh, Nicolas Greinacher
- Festival Favourite Jury Award: So Beautiful, Brandon Nicoletti

=== 2021 ===
- Audience Choice Award: Christian in the Closet, Joel Fleming
- Festival Favourite Jury Award: Sunday, Arun Fulara

=== 2022 ===
- Audience Choice Award: Emergence: Out of the Shadows, Vinay Giridhar
- Festival Favourite Jury Award: Before the Eruption, Roberto Perez Toledo
