= Kreivės / Vilnius Queer Festival =

LGBTQ film festival in Lithuania

Vilnius Queer Festival “Kreivės” is an annual LGBT film festival in Lithuania. The term "Kreivės" from the Lithuanian language means "the curves".

The festival is open to feature films, documentaries and short films focusing on lesbian, gay, bisexual, transgender, queer, and intersex themes. Nonetheless, building on earlier and cooperating with current other queer initiatives, the festival aspires to be a unique space for film screenings, events, and community building. Working languages of the festival are Lithuanian and English. Works accepted to screen at the festival are categorised in competitive and non-competitive categories at the discretion of "Kreivės".

Held in a little cinema in central Vilnius and venues across the town, "Kreivės" events attract several thousand visitors each year. Entrance to the festival's film screenings and events is donation-based.

The festival is organised by In Corpore in cooperation with other organisations and individual activists and artists.

== 2017 winners and featured movies ==
- Best Short Film: Beautiful figure (Szép alak): A realistic tale of unrequited desire and infatuation.
- Jury's Special Mention: Mr. Sugar daddy: The performance of Bengt C.W. Carlsson gives life to some essential questions about sex, love, and aging.
- Audience Choice: Cas: Pepijn and Sjors' steady, seven-year relationship is shaken up after they allow a young student named Cas to sleep on their couch until he finds a place of his own.
