= Bangkok Gay and Lesbian Film Festival =

LGBTQ film festival in Thailand

Bangkok Gay and Lesbian Film Festival (BGLFF)
- Location: Bangkok, Thailand
- Founded: 2015
- Hosted by: Attitude Magazine
- Language: International
- Website: Official website (on Facebook)

Bangkok Gay and Lesbian Film Festival (BGLFF) is an annual LGBT film festival held in Bangkok, Thailand.

== History ==
BGLFF was established by the staff of Attitude Magazine, an LGBT weekly publication in Bangkok, in 2015. The magazine, which began publishing in 2011, is the first in Thailand to specifically address the interests of the country's LGBT community, and to seek to represent LGBT views in wider Thai society.

The 2015 Festival lasted for 10 days, with 15 films from 12 countries, including Vietnam, Indonesia, the Philippines, China, South Korea, the United States and Europe. The first film to open the first Festival in 2015 was How To Win At Checkers (Every Time), a film about two brothers, one gay, set around a military draft day in Thailand.

== See also ==
- List of LGBT film festivals
