= Geelong Pride Film Festival =

LGBTQ film festival in Victoria, Australia

The Geelong Pride Film Festival (GPFF) is an LGBT film festival held in Geelong, Victoria, Australia.

The festival screens contemporary and classic LGBTIQA+ themed feature-length and short films and is one of the largest regional LGBTIQA+ film festivals in Australia. The first festival in 2018 was a sold-out event. The festival is run by volunteers through a non-profit incorporated association. The festival aims to bring more diverse films to the Geelong region and to contribute to the development and wellbeing of a vibrant community in Geelong for those who identify as LGBTQIA+ and their allies.

In February 2023 GPFF won the Victorian Pride Award for Outstanding Contribution to the Arts.

== Programming ==
Each year GPFF presents narrative feature films, documentary feature films and themed collections of short films including Rainbow Shorts (a collection of short films from across the LGBTIQ+ spectrum) and Happy Endings (a collection of short films from around the world that have positive, uplifting or humorous endings for LGBTIQ+ people), Lesbian Shorts, NextGen+ Shorts (student filmmakers and early career filmmakers) and Gender Frontiers (transgender, gender diverse and non-binary short films). Other collections have included: Celebrating Elders; Gay Shorts; Documentary Shorts; From Now On - New Beginnings; and Knowing Me, Knowing Her LBTQ Women's Shorts.

GPFF is independently curated by a programming committee. The Gender Frontiers short film collection is curated by a Transgender, Gender Diverse and Non-binary Programming Sub-committee.

GPFF uses the FilmFreeway platform to manage and coordinate film submissions.

== History ==
The festival began with a single film screening in 2017 and the first full festival was held in 2018. The first screening was 21st Anniversary screening of Hettie MacDonald's film Beautiful Thing. The Centrepiece screening of the first festival was Ian W Thompson's documentary Out in the Line-up which included a Q&A with producer and documentary subject Thomas Castets in conversation with Joel Carnegie.

In 2019 the Geelong Pride Film Festival was held from April 5–7 at the Pivotonian Cinema and Courthouse Youth Arts.

On 17 October 2019 Geelong Pride Film presented a special screening of John Waters' 1981 film Polyester to coincide with John Waters' 2019 Australian tour. This presentation featured the newly remastered edition of the film and was screened with Odorama cards.

The 2020 Geelong Pride Film Festival was postponed due to the COVID-19 pandemic and was restaged as an online event in October and November 2020. The 2021 Geelong Pride Film Festival was a hybrid event combining online and cinema screenings featuring 9 feature films and fifty-six short films across six themed collections. In 2021 five of the feature films were presented in partnership with Melbourne Queer Film Festival.

The 2022 Geelong Pride Film Festival included ten feature films and fifty short films. Opening night 2022 celebrated the return to cinemas with a sold-out party and screening of Todd Stephens' Swan Song starring Udo Kier.

== Awards and Prizes ==
GPFF awards prizes and commissions each year to filmmakers and screenwriters. Regular prizes include the GPFF Uplift Award recognising a film that is affirming and uplifting and features positive representation of LGBTIQ+ characters. Other prizes include the GPFF Design in Film Award, the GPFF Student Filmmaker Award and the Best LGBTIQ+ Documentary or Non-fiction Short Film.

== See also ==
- List of LGBT film festivals
- List of LGBT events
