= Asian Queer Film Festival =

LGBTQ film festival in Japan

Asian Queer Film Festival (AQFF)
- Location: Tokyo, Japan
- Founded: 2007
- Directors: Miho Iri
- Hosted by: Cinemart Roppongi, Tokyo
- Festival date: Every second year; months vary
- Language: Asian languages (English subtitles)
- Website: Official website (as of 2013)

Asian Queer Film Festival (AQFF) is a film festival for LGBT audiences held in Tokyo, Japan. It screens only Asian films. The festival began in 2007 and is held every two years. The purpose of the festival is to raise awareness and understanding of LGBT issues in Asia.

== 2007 ==
Date

- April 14–20, 2007

Place

- Cinema-Arton Shimokitazawa

Films

- Love for Share (2005, Indonesia)
- Red Doors (2005, USA)
- The Blossoming of Maximo Oliveros (2005, Philippines)

== 2009 ==
Date

- September 19–23, 2009

Place

- KINEATTIC in Harajuku (Mini Theater)

Films

- Seeds of Summer (2007, Israel)
- The World Unseen (2007, South Africa/UK)

== 2011 ==
Date

- Date was changed due to 2011 Tōhoku earthquake. (May 20–22 & 27–29, 2011)
- July 8–10 & 15–17, 2011

Place

- Cinemart Roppongi

Films

- The Panda Candy (2009, China)
- The Secrets (2007, Israel)
- Yes or No, So I Love You (2010, Thailand)

== 2013 ==
Date

- May 24–26 and May 31-June 1, 2013

Place

- Cinemart Minato-ku

Films

- It Gets Better (2012, Thailand)
- One Night and Two Days (2012, Korea)
- Two Weddings and a Funeral (2012, Korea)
- Yes or No, So I Love You (2010, Thailand)

== See also ==
- List of LGBT film festivals
