= Rainbow Reels Queer and Trans Film Festival =

LGBTQ film festival in Ontario, Canada

The Rainbow Reels Queer and Trans Film Festival was an annual LGBTQ film festival in Kitchener-Waterloo, Ontario.

First staged in 2000, the festival was launched by WPIRG and staged primarily at the University of Waterloo's Davis Centre. It subsequently expanded off-campus, with most films screening at the Princess Twin theatre, and became an independent event with its own separate organizing committee in the early 2010s.

In addition to film, the festival also schedules a selection of live theatrical and musical performances.

The festival is now defunct, with its last iteration happening in 2022.
