= Ruan Fangfu =

Chinese sexologist

Ruan Fangfu (Chinese: 阮芳赋; pinyin: Ruǎn Fāngfù; 1935 - 5 January 2025) also called Fang Fu Ruan is a 20th and 21st century Chinese physician, medical historian and human rights activist from Jiangxi, China. He is renowned for his extensive research into the relationship between Chinese culture and sexuality. His publications in the early to mid 1980’s helped reform Chinese public opinion on sexuality and directly influenced the creation of numerous private and state sexology and family planning organizations. In America, Ruan Fangfu worked as a respected researcher and professor at Texas Technical University and the New York State University at Buffalo. He is editor and author of A Chinese manual of Sex Knowledge (性知识手册, Xingzhishi Shouce, 1985). His most famous work is Sex in China: Studies in Sexology in Chinese Culture (1991). He is also a member of the International Encyclopedia of Sexuality (IES).

== Education ==
Ruan Fangfu obtained his doctorate of medicine from the Beijing Medical University in 1959. In 1991 he earned his second doctorate at the Institute for Advanced Study of Human Sexuality. Interested in the analysis of sexuality from early on, Ruan Fangfu’s 1959 doctoral dissertation consisted of an expansive examination of sex throughout the history of China.

== Early career ==
Ruan Fangfu began his career in 1960 as an assistant professor at the Beijing Medical University’s physiology department. In 1984, he moved to the department of medical history. From 1984-1985, Ruan Fangfu also performed the duties of an adjunct associate professor at the Worker’s Medical College. During this same time, he served as an adjunct professor of sociology for the Department of Behavioral Sciences at the Health Administration College.

== Mid career ==
In 1988, Raun Fangfu moved to the United States of America, and began working as a visiting associate professor of sociology at Texas Technical University. At this same time, he also maintained an adjunct professor position at the New York State University at Buffalo School of Nursing. There, he taught classes both in medicine and history.

== Later career ==
In 1990, Fangfu began working as the vice-president of the Academy of Chinese Culture and Health Sciences in Oakland, California. There, he also held a professorial position in the Department of Oriental Sexology at the Institute for Advanced Study of Human Sexuality in San Francisco, California.

== Works ==
Ruan Fangfu’s created Sex in China: Studies in Chinese Culture, which was part of the “Perspectives in Sexuality” series published by Springer and edited by A. Richard Green. This book covers myriad topics, including the sexual philosophy of Yin and Yang, modern Chinese sexual practices, sexual techniques of the Taoists, illicit prostitution practices in China, homosexuality in China, Transsexualism in China, and classical Chinese erotica. Sex in China: Studies in Chinese Culture remains relevant to this day, and is still considered a prevalent source on Chinese sexuality.

== Publications ==
Title	Publisher	Year
Probing the Stages of Development of Eugenics	Journal of Dialectics of Nature,	1983
A Chinese manual of Sex Knowledge 性知识手册	Xingzhishi Shouce	1985
Male homosexuality in contemporary mainland China	Springer	1988
The First Case of Transsexual Surgery in Mainland China	The Journal Of Sex Research	1988
The Fragrant Flower: Classic Chinese Erotica in Art and Poetry (Chinese Erotic and Sexual Classics in Translation)	Prometheus Books	1990
Sex in China: Studies in Sexology in Chinese Culture	Springer	1991
Pleasant Temperament (Ruan Fang Fu sexuality mixed on)	Marina Pub	2000
International Encyclopedia of Sexuality	Kinsey	1997-2001

== Associations ==
Ruan Fangfu is currently an active member of the American Board of Sexologists, the Academy of Clinical Sexologists, Society for the Scientific Study of Sex, North American-Chinese Sociologists Association, Institute for Advanced Study of Human Sexuality Alumni Association and American College of Sexologists.

== Activism ==
Before leaving China for America in the late 1980’s Ruan Fangfu was a leading advocate for the reform of repressive Chinese attitudes toward sexuality. His publications and activism had a major effect on the public opinion on sexuality, and it is argued that his contributions directly influenced the creation of numerous private and state sanctioned sexology and family planning organizations across China.

== Controversy ==
The publication of Ruan Fangfu’s Handbook of Sexual Knowledge, which was published in 1985, flew in the face of China’s implicit ban on all sex-related topics. His work significantly affected the discourse around sex in China, and catalyzed a series of similar research projects within the country. Fangfu’s publications also caused academic unrest because they broke from Eastern tradition in their reliance on Western medical practices and inclusion of imported Western knowledge. Ruan Fangfu also published a column around this same time titled: “On Sexual Education,” which was targeted at Chinese parents. This column, published in Required Reading for Parents Magazine, is credited with helping to pioneer a new era of sex discourse in the country. The immediate fallout from these controversies directly led to the formation of the Guangdong Institute of Planned Parenthood and Sex Education, the Shanghai Center for Sociology of Sex Studies, and the Shanghai Institute of Sex Education.

In 1988, while working at Texas Technical Institute, Ruan Fangfu published “Male homosexuality in contemporary mainland China,” a groundbreaking study of Eastern homosexuality. This paper was the first of its kind, exposing the widespread existence of homosexuality in China—which is illegal in practice—and the culture of fear that persisted in the community. The paper also called for widespread better treatment, and acceptance of homosexuality in China.

== See also ==
- Taoist sexual practices
