= Feminist Formations =

Academic journal

- Discipline: Cultural studies, history, women's studies, queer theory
- Language: English
- Edited by: Rebecca Ropers-Huilman

Publication details
- Former name(s): NWSA Journal
- History: 1988-present
- Publisher: Johns Hopkins University Press for the National Women's Studies Association (United States)
- Frequency: Triannually

Standard abbreviations
- ISO 4: Fem. Form.

Indexing
- ISSN: 2151-7363 (print); 2151-7371 (web)
- JSTOR: 10400656
- OCLC no.: 463430899

Links
- Journal homepage; Online access

Feminist Formations is a peer-reviewed academic journal established in 1988 as the NWSA Journal (also known as the National Women's Studies Association Journal); the name was changed beginning with the Spring 2010 issue. It publishes interdisciplinary and multicultural feminist scholarship in women's, gender, and sexuality studies linking feminist theory with teaching and activism. In addition to its essays focusing on feminist scholarship and its reviews of books, the journal regularly publishes special issues focused on topics especially important in the field of women's, gender, and sexuality studies and also features vibrant cover art and poetry and cutting-edge feminist artists and poets. The journal is edited by Patti Duncan, a professor of Women, Gender, and Sexuality Studies at Oregon State University, and is published three times per year by the Johns Hopkins University Press.

== See also ==
- Women's studies
