= Critical Arts =

- Discipline: Cultural studies, media studies
- Language: English
- Edited by: Keyan Tomaselli

Publication details
- History: 1980–present
- Publisher: Routledge
- Frequency: 5/year

Standard abbreviations
- ISO 4: Crit. Arts

Indexing
- ISSN: 0256-0046 (print); 1992-6049 (web)
- LCCN: 85643464
- OCLC no.: 498883117

Links
- Journal homepage; Online access; Online archive

Critical Arts is a peer-reviewed academic journal publishing articles which examine how disciplines represented by cultural and media studies think about themselves in terms of critical dialogues generated within the south–north relationship, with special reference to Africa. It was established in 1980 and is published by Routledge and UNISA Press.

== Abstracting and indexing ==
The journal is abstracted and indexed in:

- Arts & Humanities Citation Index
- British Humanities Index
- International Bibliography of the Social Sciences
- Linguistics and Language Behavior Abstracts
- MLA International Bibliography
- Social Sciences Citation Index
