= Aomori International LGBT Film Festival =

LGBTQ film festival in Japan

The Aomori International LGBT Film Festival (Japanese: 青森インターナショナルLGBTフィルムフェスティバル) has been held annually in Aomori Prefecture since July 2006 and focuses on diverse representations of gender. It is held at the five-story Auga in the city of Aomori.

== Films shown ==
2006 (1st year), from July 29

- Tying the Knot (US, 2004)
- chocolate (Japan, 2000)
- Himawari (Japan, 2004)
- Hete kuchigusuri (Japan, 2005)
- Straight Out: Stories from Iceland (Iceland, 2003)

2007 (2nd year), from July 21

- Until the Moon Waxes (Japan, 2007)
- Hands (Japan, 2005)

2008 (3rd year) from July 27

- Dangerous Living: Coming Out in the Developing World (US, 2005)
- The Times of Harvey Milk (US, 1984)

2009 (4th year) from July 25

- Follow My Voice: With the Music of Hedwig (US, 2006)
- Eternal Summer (Taiwan, 2006)
- When I Become Silent (Japan, 2007)

2010 (5th year) from July 3

- Mariko Rose, the Spook (Japan, 2009)
- Paragraph 175 (US, 2000)
- Love of Siam (Thailand, 2007)

2011 (6th year) from July 3

- Shimijimi aruiteru (Japan, 2010)
- Spring Fever (China/France, 2009)

2012 (7th year)

- Pyuupiru 20011-2008 (Japan, 2009)
- Boku no koi, Kare no himitsu (Japan, 2004)
- Coming Out Story

2013 (8th year) from July 20

- Cloudburst (US/Canada, 2011)
- Loose Cannons (Italy, 2010)
- Yuriko, Dasvidaniya (Japan, 2011)

2014 (9th year) from July 13

- Call Me Kuchu (US, 2012)
- Tsuyako (US, 2011)
- Esora (Japan, 2013)
- Boku no Naka no Otoko no Musume (Japan, 2012)
