= &PROUD =

LGBTQ film festival in Myanmar

Yangon Pride LGBTIQ Festival (&PROUD)
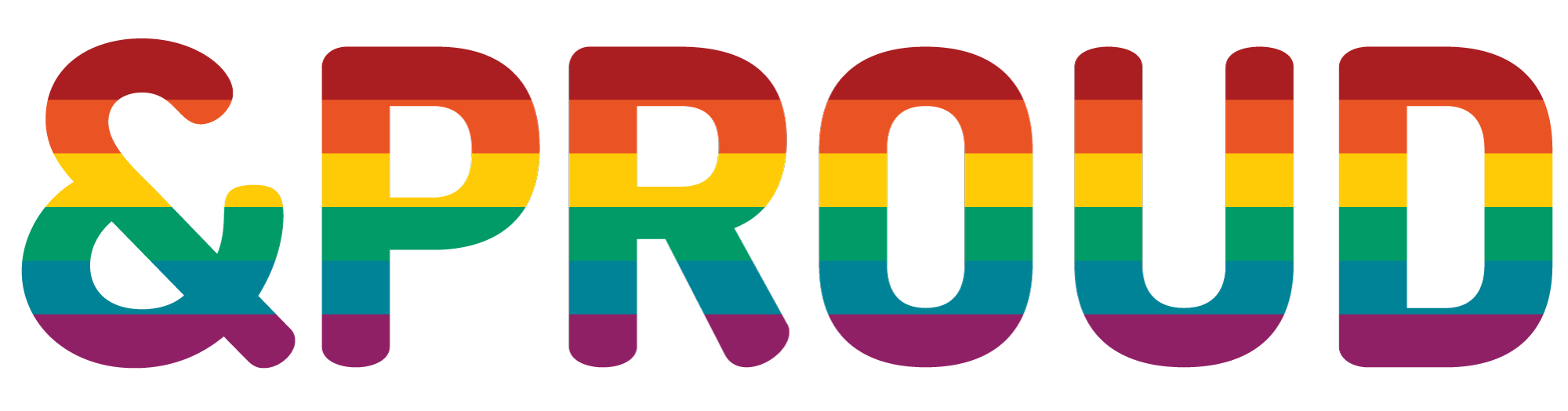
- Location: Yangon, Myanmar
- Founded: 2014
- Founded by: Hla Myat Tun, Jan Willem van Rooij, Billy Stewart
- Language: Bilingual Burmese and English
- Website: https://www.andproud.net

&PROUD (Pronounced: "And Proud") is a non-profit organization in Yangon, Myanmar, that organizes LGBTIQ (Lesbian, Gay Bi, Transgender, Intersex, Queer) art and culture events. &PROUD is best known for their yearly Yangon Pride festival, which takes place over two weekends at the end of January. The festival includes &PROUD LGBTIQ Film Festival, which usually occurs during the second weekend. In addition, there is an 'On The Road' programme that takes film screenings to other towns, cities and universities around Myanmar.

== History ==
&PROUD was founded in 2014 by 3 co-founders, with the backing of Colors Rainbows (the main LGBT rights organization in Myanmar). At the time, there were no large public LGBT events in Myanmar, and same-sex relations remain illegal in Myanmar to date.

&PROUD's first activity was a queer photo exhibition with work from Myanmar and Vietnam. As the exhibition was a success and without any government interference, the first LGBT film festival was organised at the French Institute in Yangon in November 2014. Between 2014 and 2017 &PROUD continued to organise both a yearly film festival and photo exhibition, as well as film-making workshops and small screenings around Myanmar.

In 2018 the organisation has received government permission to organise the festival at Thakhin Mya Park in downtown Yangon. That year, the festival was held over 2 weekends at the end of January, with the first weekend being a large Pride event in the park. In 2019 the festival changed its name to become Yangon Pride and the River Pride Boat Parade was added as a yearly event.

== Film Festival ==
The &PROUD Yangon LGBTQ Film Festival had its first edition from November 14 to the 16 during the year of 2014 at the French Institute in Yangon. The festival showcases films on Asian LGBTI lives, and combines film screenings with debates, performances and parties.

The 2015 edition was moved from November to January 2016 due to the 2015 Myanmar general election. It was hosted at the French Institute between January 28 to the 31 and attracted 3500 visitors over four days. For the third edition, the festival will return to the French Institute from January 26–29 in 2017. &PROUD Film Festival is a founding member of the Asia-Pacific Queer Film Festival Alliance (APQFFA).

== &PROUD Photo ==
Part of &PROUD's main activities is a yearly photo exhibition at Myanmar Deitta gallery that coincides with the International Day Against Homophobia and Transphobia (IDAHOT) on May 17. In the run up to the exhibition, a photo competition is organised, welcoming photos that portrait the Myanmar LGBT community in a positive light. The week-long exhibition combines the best photos from the competition with an exhibition from a leading Southeast Asian photographer.

In 2014, Vietnamese photographer Maika Elan's work "The Pink Choice" was exhibited. Elan's work was one of the winners in the World Press Photo 2013. The 2015 edition showed "Continuum" from Malaysian photographer kG Krishnan on Kuala Lumpur transgender women. The 2016 edition showcased work from Vlad Sohkin, titled "Being Gay in Papua New Guinea"

== See also ==
- List of LGBT film festivals
