= Patti Duncan =

American academic and author

Patti Duncan is an American academic and author, and a Professor of Women, Gender, and Sexuality Studies at Oregon State University.

Duncan's main focus is "transnational feminisms, women of color feminisms, feminist media studies, feminist motherhood studies, queer studies, and critical mixed race studies".

== Education ==
Duncan completed her bachelor of arts degree at Vassar College and both her Master of Arts and PhD in Women's Studies at Emory University.

== Teaching career ==
While at Emory, she worked as a graduate instructor and eventually a visiting assistant professor at the Institute for Women's Studies within Emory. After graduating, she worked as a visiting researcher in Seoul, South Korea at Ewha Woman's University. Duncan led a travel seminar on gender, migration, and globalization to Mexico in 2007 and in 2008 she taught for the Semester at Sea program in the Caribbean and Southeast Asia.

In 2008, Duncan became an associate professor at Oregon State University. She was the co-leader of a seminar on women, gender, and feminist activism to India in 2014, and taught a seminar on gender and sexuality in Greece in 2015.

== Published works ==
In 2004, Duncan wrote Tell This Silence: Asian American Women Writers and the Politics of Speech, which focuses on the multitude of meanings and silences in Asian American women's writings that support her theory that American feminism must recognize how Asian American women have resisted oppression in their lives.

In 2009, Duncan co-produced Finding Face, a documentary that follows Tat Marina, who was attacked with acid in Cambodia because of her gender.

In 2014, Duncan co-edited Mothering in East Asian Communities: Politics and Practices, which brings together many authors from different backgrounds to investigate experiences of East Asian motherhood in the US and Canada. In 2018, she co-edited Women's Lives Around the World: A Global Encyclopedia, which analyzes transnational and postcolonial issues that hinder the success of women and girls globally.

In 2016, Duncan became the editor of Feminist Formations, a peer-reviewed journal that publishes research on social justice, race, gender, and feminism.
