= Cui Zi'en =

- Born: 1958 (age 67–68); Harbin, China
- Education: Chinese Academy of Social Sciences
- Occupations: Film producer Film director
- Years active: 1990s–present
- Awards: Radio Literature Award; 2001 Uncle's Past (IGLHRC) International Gay and Lesbian Human Rights Commission; Felipa Award

Cui Zi'en (Chinese: 崔子恩; pinyin: Cuī Zǐ'ēn), born 1958, in Harbin in the People's Republic of China, is a film director, producer, film scholar, screenwriter, novelist and an outspoken LGBT activist based in Beijing. He graduated from the Chinese Academy of Social Sciences with an MA in literature and now is an associate professor at the Film Research Institute of the Beijing Film Academy.

Cui Zi'en is one of the avant-garde DV makers in Chinese underground film. He has published nine novels in China and Hong Kong, one of which, Uncle's Past, won the 2001 Radio Literature Award in Germany. In the same year, he founded the Beijing Queer Film Festival, the first LGBT film festival in mainland China. He is also the author of books on criticism and theory, as well as a columnist for magazines.

== Recognition ==
In 2002, the International Gay and Lesbian Human Rights Commission (IGLHRC) presented the Felipa de Souza Award to Cui Zi'en.

Cui brought issues of same-sex love into Chinese culture and public awareness, with a prolific crop of critically acclaimed articles, lectures, books, and films, including the first gay novel in modern China. Despite it being banned in mainland China, the novel is still available through unofficial channels.

== Filmography ==
Year	English title	Original title	Notes
1999	Men and Women (Man Man Woman Woman) (Nannan nünü)	男男女女	writer
2002	Enter the Clowns	丑角登场	writer, director, actor
2002	The Old Testament	旧约	writer, director
2002	Welcome to Destination Shanghai	目的地，上海	actor
2003	Feeding Boys, Ayaya	哎呀呀，去哺乳	writer, director, actor, producer
2003	Keep Cool and Don't Blush	脸不变色心不跳	writer, director
2003	Night Scene	夜景	writer, director
2004	An Interior View of Death	死亡的內景	writer, director
2004	The Narrow Path	雾语	writer, director
2004	Pirated Copy	蔓延	writer
2004	Shitou and That Nana	石头和那个娜娜	writer, director
2004	Star Appeal	星星相吸惜	writer, director
2005	WC	呼呼哈嘿	writer, director
2005	Withered in a Blooming Season (Withered Lads in a Blooming Season)	少年花草黄	writer, director
2006	Empty Town	水墨青春	writer
2006	Refrain	副歌	writer, director
2007	My Fair Son	我如花似玉的儿子	director
2008	Er Dong	二冬	producer
2008	Queer China, 'Comrade' China	誌同志	writer, director
2010	The Wild Strawberries	野草莓	writer

== See also ==
- Homosexuality in China

=== Other Chinese LGBT film directors ===
- Simon Chung
- Kit Hung
- Stanley Kwan
- Quentin Lee
- Zihan Loo
- Scud
- Yonfan
- Fan Popo
- Jenny Man Wu
