= Beijing Queer Film Festival =

LGBTQ film festival in China

Beijing Queer Film Festival (BJQFF)
- Location: Various locations in Beijing, China
- Founded: 2001 (by Cui Zi'en)
- Directors: Jenny Man Wu (co-director)
- Hosted by: Beijing Queer Film Festival Committee
- Festival date: September – November each year
- Language: International
- Website: Official website (Chinese & English)

Beijing Queer Film Festival (BJQFF), (Chinese: 北京酷儿影展), is an LGBT film festival, held annually in Beijing, the capital city of the People's Republic of China. It was the first LGBT film festival to be established in mainland China, founded in 2001 by the Chinese author and LGBT film director Cui Zi'en, a professor at the Beijing Film Academy.

Other Chinese-language LGBT film festivals in the region, which also feature international LGBT films with Chinese subtitles, include CINEMQ, Hong Kong Lesbian & Gay Film Festival, ShanghaiPRIDE Film Festival and Taiwan International Queer Film Festival. Like the Beijing Queer Film Festival, Shanghai Queer Film Festival, is a volunteer-run, not-for-profit event, and aims to help facilitate and promote the work of filmmakers from Chinese and other Asian backgrounds.

Beijing has a large LGBT community. The Festival originated from Peking University, and is considered to be "the only community-based non-governmental film festival in China with a special focus on gender and sexuality".

In 2011, Chinese filmmaker Yang Yang made a documentary entitled Our Story: The Beijing Queer Film Festival's 10 Years of "Guerrilla Warfare" (我們的故事：北京酷兒影展十年游擊戰), reporting on the struggles of the Festival and the team behind it, and examining the role of the Chinese government's media censorship. The festival was cancelled in 2026 following police harassment.

== Background ==
The screening of LGBT films presents a challenge to filmmakers and festival organizers in China, as the country has a censorship law that prohibits any positive depiction of lesbian, gay, bisexual or transgender lives in films or TV shows. The selection of mainstream venues is not permitted, and the big international festivals in Shanghai and Beijing do not show gay-themed films, whilst DVDs of films such as Brokeback Mountain are only available on the black market.

The founder of the Beijing Queer Film Festival, Cui Zi'en, says "The biggest change is that I'm not the only one doing this... There's more support from the gay community. Society has become more relaxed and open-minded in its thinking". Community organizers say that gay-themed events that would have been banned a few years ago are now being permitted.

== History ==
Beijing Queer Film Festival was founded in 2001 by Chinese film director Cui Zi'en. During the Festival's early years, screenings were often cancelled at short notice by the security police, and films were moved from cinemas and universities to bars and private homes. Publicity was largely by word-of-mouth and the organizers were notified that they may be arrested. The Festival was closed by the police in 2001 and 2005, and the Festival's main venues were changed or cancelled.

The second edition, in 2002, relocated its screenings from Beijing University to the-then semi-'underground' 798 arts district, (in Dashanzi, north east of Beijing city centre), which is described as "China's version of New York's SoHo". In 2011, the Festival was again ordered shut down by government officials.

In 2013, the Festival proceeded without interruption. Organizers did no public advertising for the event, and many screening venues were announced at the last minute. Several more publicized screenings were held at the French and Dutch embassies, and the American Center, out of reach of the local authorities. In that year, 28 films from nine countries were screened, including Chinese-language titles from mainland China, Hong Kong, Macau and Taiwan. The Festival also hosted a debate on the topic of film censorship in China.

Due to the perceived success of the Festival in 2013, the organizers for the 2014 edition decided to hold the screenings in a public cinema and marketed the Festival to the Beijing LGBT community through social media. However, during this period, the Chinese Government, under the country's new leadership, Xi Jinping and Li Keqiang, arrested critics and closed down NGOs that were regarded as potentially critical of the government. In late August 2013, the Beijing Independent Film Festival had been forced to close, and would-be audience members were dispersed by police, whilst the venue's electricity supply was switched off and the organizers were detained. During this time, police seized documents and film archives from their offices. As a result of these developments, the 2014 Festival organizers decided to change their approach, and abandoned the idea of using a public cinema, and decided to cut back on their social media activities. Shortly before the festival began, two security officers visited the Festival Co-director, Jenny Man Wu, a queer identified woman with a long-term interest in LGBT cinema. They told her that they had tapped her phone and read all her emails, and that, if she went ahead with the Festival as planned, "there would be trouble for her."

On the day before the opening of the 2014 Festival, an email was sent to potential attendees that there was a new plan. They were told to "go to the central Beijing railway station the next morning, purchase tickets for the 11:15 AM train to a town near the Great Wall, and proceed to car [carriage] number 7", with the note ending "Make sure to bring your laptops". The following morning, the train carriage was filled with a mixture of Chinese LGBT film buffs, filmmakers, academics, artists and activists. Jenny handed out flash drives for the laptops, containing the opening film, Our Story, a retrospective of the Festival's history. "It might not be the most ideal way to enjoy a queer film. However this can be a strong action showing our resistance and resilience!" Jenny claimed. The rest of the festival went off without major incident. Most of the films were from China, with others from Hong Kong, Taiwan, South Korea and Europe. There were features, documentaries, a variety of shorts including several student films, and panels on topics ranging from "Light Documentary, Heavy Activism" to "Women on Top." Many of the screenings and panel discussions took place at the Dutch Embassy, beyond the control of the Beijing local authorities.

In 2026, the festival was cancelled after harassment by the Beijing Municipal Public Security Bureau.

== See also ==
- List of LGBT film festivals
- LGBTQ rights in China
