= Pink Life QueerFest =

LGBTQ film festival in Turkey

- Location: Istanbul, Turkey
- Founded: 2011
- Language: International
- Website: pembehayatkuirfest.org

Pink Life QueerFest or Queer Fest is an international LGBT themed film festival held in various cities of Turkey. The Queer Fest, held in 2011 for the first time, is the first LGBT themed film festival of Turkey. The festival, held in Ankara until 2013, started to be organized in Denizli and Mersin from 2014.

== History ==
Pink Life QueerFest was started in 2011 by Pink Life LGBTİ+ Solidarity Association in Ankara. The festival was held in Ankara until 2013. Beginning from 2014, the festival started to be organized also in İstanbul, Denizli and Mersin.

=== Prohibition in Ankara ===
In 2017, the governorship of Ankara announced the prohibition of all LGBTİ+ activities indefinitely, including Pink Life QueerFest in Ankara on the grounds that "some groups of people can react these events based their social sensitivities".

It is prohibited indefinitely by the Governorship of Ankara.
