= CINEMQ =

LGBTQ film festival in China

- Location: Shanghai, China
- Founded: 2015
- Hosted by: Volunteer-run, N.F.P.
- Language: Chinese & International
- Website: www.cinemq.com

CINEMQ was a queer cinema collective and LGBT film festival held in Shanghai, China. It was established in 2015.

== History ==
CINEMQ was a volunteer-led, not-for-profit collective engaged in queer cultural activism through film and screen culture in Mainland China. Their main activity was a thematic queer film screening and party series, described as a "mix tape of short films, visuals and music". They screened films that were "queer, or concerned with issues of gender or non-heterosexualities". Drawing on film submissions and other sources, they took an experimental approach to film programming that highlighted concepts relevant to the local queer community, challenging "a diverse audience on how they think about issues of gender and sexuality in life and in media".

Due to government restrictions, CINEMQ and other LGBT film festivals in China play primarily in underground spaces. They have also screened films in Beijing and London.

Unlike the city's other film festivals, which worked in collaboration with foreign consulates and corporate sponsors, CINEMQ was more closely aligned with Shanghai's underground arts scene and youth culture. According to organizer Will Dai, "Queerness is very much entangled with youth culture in Shanghai. There's a fluidity within these sub-cultural groups that see gender and sexuality explored and sometimes dismantled through fashion, music, and art." Youth culture's experimentation with sexuality and gender in China is, according to de Kloet and Fung, a reaction to the dominance of heterosexual-patriarchal discourses. They identify youth engagement in queer culture(s) as an act of disruption. "A lot of young people are catching up to this idea of being free and expressive of their individuality. To us, I think that's the essence of being queer," Dai states. "CINEMQ's content can be seen as political, but since we're pushing it through culture and cinema it might not seem as confrontational – it's soft power."

CINEMQ was established in 2015 by Matthew Baren and Alvin Li. The collective was originally launched as a creative crowd-building initiative for ShanghaiPRIDE Film Festival. The aim was to broaden the reach of ShanghaiPRIDE to better represent local diversity. According to Baren, "whilst Pride is a great organization which does a lot for the community, there are a lot of people who aren't reached by their events or who don't feel represented by them. Our idea was to create a space for fringe queers, people of non-distinct sexuality or gender, for people who wanted to be challenged by what they saw on a night out whilst still having fun."

In 2017 CINEMQ ended its association with ShanghaiPRIDE. They expanded their operation to publish a bilingual online magazine through social media platform WeChat covering queer cinema and screen culture, with a focus on China and East Asia.

In 2019 CINEMQ partnered with London-based 'Queer' Asia to co-present their annual film festival. The 11-day event saw film screenings and discussions hosted at venues including British Museum, SOAS University of London, King's College London and the University of Warwick.

== See also ==
- List of LGBT film festivals
