= Shanghai Queer Film Festival =

LGBTQ film festival in China

Shanghai Queer Film Festival (SHQFF)
- Location: Shanghai, China
- Founded: 2017
- Directors: Tingting Shi
- Hosted by: Volunteer-run, N.F.P.
- Festival date: September; Annual
- Language: International
- Website: shqff.org

Shanghai Queer Film Festival, (SHQFF) (Chinese: 上海酷儿影展), established in 2017, was an annual LGBT film festival in Shanghai. It was first held from 16—24 September 2017. It was a volunteer-run, not-for-profit community event, offering 'a week of screenings, parties, workshops and discussions'. The festival was directed by founder Tingting Shi.

== Background ==
According to Shi, events in Shanghai's vibrant queer scene are 'generally tailored to a Western sensibility.' This assertion is backed up by Dr. Hongwei Bao, who has noted that events such as ShanghaiPRIDE have a pervasive 'non-Chinese' perspective. Shanghai Queer Film Festival is run by a mostly local Chinese team, and focuses primarily on Asian film, through initiatives such as an Asian Short Film Competition, and partnerships with regional groups. Festival programmer Yu Jing argues that through such a focus, they "reveal an abundance of queer Asian characters, encourage discussion on queer culture in the East, and represent diversity the diversity of love and freedom."

The festival identified itself as queer, rather than simply LGBT, as a way of signposting a more progressive and nuanced discussion for Chinese audiences. Shi states that "...local audiences lack a certain understanding of the real scope of our diversity, including diversity in the community, and some more recent concepts. Given this, what we tried to do when selecting films was to highlight new ideas and pick films that could spark dialogues instead of just striving for a perfectly balanced representation of different LGBTQ identities.'

The week-long festival was run by a team of over 20 unpaid volunteers - designers, writers, curators, marketers and others. The festival featured discussion groups, workshops, talks and lectures from leading academics, as well as networking and parties. Events such as panel discussions and networking sessions enabled filmmakers to spread their material more widely and to connect better to audiences. As a not-for-profit, community-based organisation, Shanghai Queer Film Festival was free of charge and open to the general public. The audience was encouraged to question filmmakers and explore the issues raised in the films they attend, with the festival describing its aim to provide "a week of culture, engagement and celebration".

== 2017 ==
The festival theme was We Are Here. The opening night films were Richard Fung's documentaries on the changing face of queer Asian identity in Canada Orientations and Re:Orientations. Other screenings included Tale of the Lost Boys, Lan Yu, Starting Over and Indian documentary Breaking Free. SHQFF Best Short Film prize was awarded to Kaj Palanca and Jared Joven for Contestant #4. Interviewed by Inquirer, Joven stated that the win "keeps me inspired to tell more stories that are special to people like me…in the most honest way."

== 2018 ==
The festival theme was Generation Q, showing the connection between different generations of filmmakers in the 20 years since the birth of Chinese queer cinema. The opening night film was Hard Paint. Other screenings included Saving Face, Yang ± Yin: Gender in Chinese Cinema, Beautiful Men (Chinese: 人面桃花) and Extravaganza (Chinese: 炫目上海滩). The Generation Q conference held during the festival discussed future paths for queer filmmakers in East Asia. Guests included filmmakers Dean Hamer and Joe Wilson, presenting Leitis in Waiting.

== Awards ==
- Best Film SHQFF 2017
- Best Director SHQFF 2017
- Best Cinematography SHQFF 2017
- Best Editing SHQFF 2017
- Best Screenplay SHQFF 2017
- Best Actor SHQFF 2017

== See also ==
- List of LGBT film festivals
