= Noam Gonick =

Canadian filmmaker and artist

- Born: March 20, 1973 (age 53); Winnipeg, Manitoba, Canada
- Education: Ryerson University
- Occupations: Filmmaker, artist
- Notable work: Hey, Happy!, Stryker, To Russia with Love
- Parent: Cy Gonick

Noam Gonick, RCA (born March 20, 1973) is a Canadian filmmaker and artist. His films include Hey, Happy!, Stryker, Guy Maddin: Waiting for Twilight and To Russia with Love. His work deals with homosexuality, social exclusion, dystopia and utopia.

== Background ==
Gonick was born in Winnipeg, Manitoba in 1970. His father, Cy Gonick, is an economist and former member of the Manitoba Legislature. Gonick graduated from Ryerson University in Toronto. He edited Ride, Queer, Ride (1997) a collection of writings on and by filmmaker Bruce LaBruce. In 2007, he was made the youngest inductee to the Royal Canadian Academy of Arts.

He has been on the board at the Plug-In Institute of the Contemporary Arts.

== Film and television ==
Gonick's first film was the 1997 short 1919, a historically revisionist depiction of the Winnipeg General Strike from the window of a gay Oriental bathhouse. His next film was the documentary Guy Maddin: Waiting for Twilight, narrated by Tom Waits and featuring Shelley Duvall. The film captures Maddin as he begins production on Twilight of the Ice Nymphs (1997). In 1999, Gonick created the experimental short Tinkertown.

In 2001, Gonick released his first feature film, Hey, Happy!. The film premiered at the 2001 Sundance Film Festival, and had its Canadian premiere at the Inside Out Film and Video Festival, where it won the award for Best Canadian Film. In its subsequent Canadian theatrical release, it was screened with Guy Maddin's short film The Heart of the World.

In the early 2000s, Gonick directed a number of episodes of Canadian documentary television series KinK, before releasing his second feature film Stryker in 2004.

In 2007, Gonick wrote and directed Retail, a comedy television pilot, followed by Hirsch (2010), on John Hirsch, and What If? (2011), on Leslee Silverman, artistic director of Manitoba Theatre for Young People.

In 2012, he won the Winnipeg Film Group's Manitoba Film Hothouse Award.

Gonick directed the documentary To Russia with Love, featuring LGBT athletes in the 2014 Winter Olympics. The film was nominated for a GLAAD Media Award for Outstanding Documentary at the 26th GLAAD Media Awards,

In 2016, he was one of the directors of the documentary series Taken for Aboriginal People's Television Network, about murdered and missing Indigenous women.

In 2025, his film Parade: Queer Acts of Love and Resistance premiered as the opening film of the Hot Docs Canadian International Documentary Festival.

== Installation ==
Gonick's installation art began in 2005 with a collaboration with Rebecca Belmore at the Venice Biennale.

Wildflowers of Manitoba (2007) is a performance piece and film installation created with Luis Jacob. A geodesic dome is furnished as a teenaged bedroom, and includes images of homoeroticism. It premiered at the Berlin International Film Festival, and has been exhibited worldwide.

Precious Blood (2007), commissioned by the Ontario College of Art and Design, was a video of interviews with girlfriends and friends of inmates on the façade a scale model of the Provincial Remand Centre in Winnipeg.

Commerce Court (2008) is a satire on corruption in the financial industry. Projected originally onto a six-story building in Commerce Court, the world headquarters of the Canadian Imperial Bank of Commerce, it features a performance by Roman Danylo as a banker having a nervous breakdown. The installation premiered at Toronto's Nuit Blanche.

No Safe Words (2009) is a multi-channel video installation uses sports broadcasts to examine athletic stadiums as sites of violence. The piece, broadcast originally during Toronto's 2008 Pride March, has also been interpreted as a commentary on the deradicalization of the gay pride movement.

Gonick and Bernie Miller collaborated on Bloody Saturday, a public monument in Winnipeg commemorating the 1919 general strike which was unveiled in 2019. Bapiiwin, a design by Gonick and Belmore for the planned LGBTQ2+ National Monument in Ottawa, was named as one of the five finalists in the design competition in November 2021, although it was not ultimately selected as the final winner.
