= Nyala Moon =

American filmmaker, writer, and actress

- Born: 1992 (age 33–34); Harlem, New York, U.S.
- Education: City College of New York (MFA)
- Occupations: filmmaker screenwriter actress
- Website: nyalamoon.com

Nyala Moon (born 1992) is an American filmmaker, screenwriter, and actress. Her work centers the lives of Black, queer, and transgender individuals, often blending bold comedy, emotional vulnerability, and autobiographical storytelling. She is best known for the short films How Not to Date While Trans (2022) and Dilating for Maximum Results (2023). In 2024, she was featured in the Whitney Biennial.

== Early life and education ==
Moon was born in Harlem, New York. She developed an early love for cinema while watching Turner Classic Movies with her family. Influenced by Sir Alfred Hitchcock, Western films, and Black independent filmmakers, she turned to filmmaking after working in the nonprofit sector supporting LGBTQ+ communities. She earned a master of fine arts degree in film production from the City College of New York.

== Career ==
Moon's filmmaking often uses satire, dark comedy, and personal narrative to examine gender, dating, and desire. She has been recognized through a number of fellowships and grants including Queer|Art’s Film Fellowship, Hillman Grad’s TV Writing Lab, and the Film Fatales Directing Fellowship.

=== How Not to Date While Trans (2022) ===
Moon’s breakout short film, How Not to Date While Trans, is a romantic comedy about a Black trans woman navigating the absurdities of dating. It premiered at NewFest and screened at over 30 film festivals including Inside Out Toronto, Wicked Queer Boston, and Seattle’s Translations Festival. The film received several awards:

- Audience Award – Inside Out Toronto LGBT Film Festival
- Best Narrative Short – Translations: Seattle Trans Film Festival
- Jury Award – Milwaukee Film Festival
- Grand Jury Award – NewFest 2022

The film was distributed by Frameline through their New Voices program.

=== Dilating for Maximum Results (2023) ===
Moon’s follow-up, Dilating for Maximum Results, is a comedic short about a Black trans woman preparing for a hookup after not dilating for years. The film continued her exploration of body, sexuality, and absurdism through a queer lens. It won:

- Grand Jury Prize – Outfest 2023
- Grand Jury Prize – NewFest 2023

=== Recognition and Exhibitions ===
Moon was awarded the NewFest/Netflix New Voices Filmmaker Grant in 2022, and was also the 2020–2021 recipient of the Queer|Art Film Fellowship, mentored by filmmaker Silas Howard. In 2022, she received the Queer|Art Illuminations Grant for Black Trans Women Visual Artists, awarded in partnership with the family of filmmaker Barbara Hammer.

In 2023, she was named one of Filmmaker Magazine’s “25 New Faces of Independent Film.”

In 2024, she was selected for the 2024 Whitney Biennial exhibition, titled Even Better Than the Real Thing, hosted at the Whitney Museum of American Art.

== Teaching ==
Moon has worked as a teaching artist at the Whitney Museum, where she leads workshops focused on trans storytelling and cinematic technique.

== Personal life ==
Moon lives in Brooklyn, New York.

== Filmography ==
- How Not to Date While Trans (2022) – writer, director, performer
- Dilating for Maximum Results (2023) – writer, director

== Awards ==
- Queer|Art Film Fellowship (2020–2021)
- Illuminations Grant for Black Trans Women Visual Artists (2022)
- Grand Jury Prize – Outfest (2023)
- Grand Jury Prize – NewFest (2023)
- Audience Award – Inside Out Toronto LGBT Film Festival (2022)
- Best Narrative Short – Translations Seattle Film Festival (2022)
- Jury Award – Milwaukee Film Festival (2022)
- Netflix/NewFest New Voices Filmmaker Grant (2022)
- Filmmaker Magazine’s "25 New Faces of Independent Film" (2023)
- Whitney Biennial Artist (2024)
