= Drag Kids =

- Film poster
- Directed by: Megan Wennberg
- Written by: Megan Wennberg
- Produced by: Edward Peill; Erin Oakes
- Starring: Queen Lactatia; Lady GaGa; Suzan Bee Anthony; Bracken Hanke
- Cinematography: Paul McCurdy
- Edited by: Warren Jefferies
- Release date: April 28, 2019 (Hot Docs)
- Running time: 80 minutes
- Country: Canada
- Language: English

Drag Kids is a Canadian documentary film, directed by Megan Wennberg and released in 2019. The film centres on Queen Lactatia, Laddy GaGa, Suzan Bee Anthony and Bracken Hanke, four young children from Canada, the United States and Europe who perform as drag entertainers, and performed together for the first time at Fierté Montréal in 2018.

The film premiered on April 28, 2019, at the Hot Docs Canadian International Documentary Festival in Toronto. In conjunction with its premiere, the stars performed at a drag brunch hosted by the city's Glad Day Bookshop. It also screened at the Inside Out Film and Video Festival the following month, and was announced as the winner of the festival's award for Best Canadian Feature.

The film had its broadcast premiere on the Documentary Channel on July 25, 2019. Concurrently with its broadcast premiere, it was added to the Canadian Broadcasting Corporation's streaming platform CBC Gem.

Its debut in United States was October 24, 2019 at NewFest in New York City. The film went into wide release in 2020.
