= Get Happy =

Get Happy may refer to:

== Music ==
- Get Happy (gospel music)
- "Get Happy" (song), a 1930 song written by Harold Arlen and Ted Koehler
- Get Happy! (Ella Fitzgerald album) (1959)
- Get Happy!, a 1991 album by George Shearing
- Get Happy!! (1980)
- Get Happy (Pink Martini album) (2013)
- Get Happy with the Randy Weston Trio, a 1955 album by Randy Weston
- Get Happy, a 2007 album by Royce Campbell

== Other uses ==
- Get Happy, conceived and created by Martin Charnin, starring Jack Lemmon
- Get Happy: A Coming of Age Musical Extravaganza, a 2008 documentary film by and about Mark Payne
- Get Happy: The Life of Judy Garland, a 2000 biography of Judy Garland by Gerald Clarke
- "Get Happy" (Better Off Ted), an episode of Better Off Ted
