= Danny in the Sky =

2001 film by Denis Langlois

- Directed by: Denis Langlois
- Written by: Bertrand Lachance; Denis Langlois
- Produced by: Bertrand Lachance; Denis Langlois
- Starring: Thierry Pépin; Eric Cabana; Véronique Jenkins
- Cinematography: Stefan Ivanov
- Edited by: Natacha Dufaux
- Music by: Simon Wayland; Peter Xirogiannis; Phil York
- Production companies: Castor & Pollux
- Distributed by: Cinéma Libre
- Release date: October 26, 2001
- Running time: 88 minutes
- Country: Canada
- Language: French

Danny in the Sky is a Canadian drama film, directed by Denis Langlois and released in 2001. The film stars Thierry Pépin as Danny, a model who works as a stripper in gay strip clubs despite being heterosexual. Raised in a dysfunctional family as the son of a closeted gay father (Eric Cabana) and a mother who died of a drug overdose, he is seeking deeper love and meaning in his life but struggles to find people who value him for anything more than his good looks.

The film premiered theatrically in Quebec in October 2001. It screened across Canada at LGBT film festivals in 2002, including the Inside Out Film and Video Festival and the Fairy Tales Gay and Lesbian Film Festival.

The film received a Jutra Award nomination for Best Original Music (Simon Wayland, Peter Xirogiannis and Phil York) at the 4th Jutra Awards in 2002.
