= A Night at Switch n' Play =

2019 American documentary film about drag and burlesque artist collective

- Film poster
- Directed by: Cody Stickels
- Based on: Artist collective
- Produced by: Chelsea Moore
- Starring: Divina GranSparkle; Pearl Harbor; K. James; Miss Malice; Vigor Mortis; Nyx Nocturne; Zoe Ziegfeld
- Cinematography: Matthew Heymann; Benjamin Dewey
- Edited by: Cody Stickels
- Music by: George Miata
- Production companies: Sour Peach Films; Grit & Glitter Productions
- Release date: June 1, 2019
- Running time: 70 minutes
- Country: United States
- Language: English

A Night at Switch n' Play is a 2019 American documentary film produced by Chelsea Moore and directed by Cody Stickels. The film is about the long-running, Brooklyn based drag and burlesque artist collective, Switch n’ Play. The documentary features performances and commentary by Divina GranSparkle, Pearl Harbor, K. James, Miss Malice, Vigor Mortis, Nyx Nocturne and Zoe Ziegfeld. The film had its world premiere at the Inside Out Film and Video Festival in Toronto on June 1, 2019, and its New York City premiere was at NewFest on October 26, 2019, where it won the Audience Award for Best Documentary. It also won Best Ensemble Performance at the Fargo-Moorhead LGBT Film Festival, and won for Best Feature Film at the Trans Stellar Film Festival. The collective has also won 'Best Burlesque Show' at the Brooklyn Nightlife Awards in 2017, 2018, and 2019. It was filmed on location in Brooklyn at the Branded Saloon, where the group regularly performs.

== Synopsis ==
The documentary highlights a typical evening at the Branded Saloon, where the collective regularly puts on their show, and uses that as a framing device for an introduction to each of its members. It opens with Miss Malice as the emcee, and along with her is Zoe Ziegfeld, her aide. Ziegfeld performs again later on during the film, including a part where she does a hand stand on one of the audience members chest. The film switches back and forth between performances and intimate interviews with the seven core members, along with glimpses behind the scenes of their drag and burlesque show.

== Cast ==
Appearing as themselves

- Divina GranSparkle
- Pearl Harbor
- K. James
- Miss Malice
- Vigor Mortis
- Nyx Nocturne
- Zoe Ziegfeld

== Critical reception ==
AM New York Metro said the film makes a point of making sure that "everyone in the room — performers and audience — are in a safe space where they can do some exploring, subverting, and defying the rules of social acceptability". Jude Dry wrote in his review for Indie Wire that the documentary shows that the artists collective is a "tight-knit family of outsiders who welcome queer audiences into their world and create a safe, tantalizing space where everyone can be themselves...and sprinkles in a generous helping of delicious live performances...if you spend just one night with Switch n' Play, you'll never want to leave". The Queer Guru said the film is not for the "faint-hearted and neither will it ever pamper to a mainstream audience, it is for queers...and was made by a group of enlightened and talented queers".

TheWrap said the film's structure was "uninventive" and "Stickels' subjects are far more memorable than the piece that contains them". They went on to say that the "doc does reflect the sensitivity required to portray these individuals mindfully in all their non-conforming rawness, from their preferred pronouns to the reclamation of their physical traits, not as inadequacies, but as parts of an unapologetically beautiful whole". Film Daze also commented on the director making sure to connect with every member, and "allowing them to express themselves unapologetically to the camera". They concluded that the film is "charming and genuine in its exploration of identity...well-crafted and well-needed dive into drag culture...and films like this one may not be revolutionary in terms of film-making, but are innovative in terms of their celebration of LGBT culture, and that alone is enough".

== Accolades ==
- Inside Out Film and Video Festival (world premiere)
- New York Lesbian, Gay, Bisexual, & Transgender Film Festival (winner of the Audience Award for Best Documentary)
- Fargo-Moorhead LGBT Film Festival (winner for Best Ensemble Performance)
- Trans Stellar Film Festival (winner for Best Feature Film)

== See also ==
- List of LGBT film festivals
- List of LGBT-related films
