= Sour Peach Films =

American film production company

Sour Peach Films is a film production company based in Brooklyn, New York. Founded by Chelsea Moore and Erica Rose in the summer of 2017, Sour Peach Films produces works focused on queer femme women. It is best known for the short film GIRL TALK which was accepted to festivals such as the Newfest LGBT Film Festival and the Iris Prize LGBT Film Festival.

== History ==
Chelsea Moore and Erica Rose met in 2015 while working on the set of a CBS pilot For Justice, directed by Ava Duvernay, which was not picked up. They created Sour Peach Films in 2017 to develop films that focused on queer femme women's experiences and sexuality to address a lack of such stories. The company also uses diverse casting and crew members.

== Productions ==
Sour Peach Films debuted a narrative short film called GIRL TALK in fall 2018, which follows a Black queer woman named Mia (Hannah Hodson) who is navigating her personal life in New York's LGBTQ spaces. The film, written and directed by Rose, is semi-autobiographical. Moore and Rose used the crowdfunding platform Seed&Spark to raise two-thirds of the budget. The majority of the cast and crew were women or gender non-conforming people.

In December 2018, they produced Please, a documentary short that highlights Sid Azmi, the owner of a Brooklyn sex shop called Please.

In February 2019, the company announced a forthcoming film about the Brooklyn drag and burlesque collective, Switch n' Play. The film, A Night at Switch n' Play, directed by Cody Stickels, premiered at Inside Out film festival on June 1, 2019.

== See also ==
- List of lesbian, gay, bisexual or transgender-related films
- History of homosexuality in American film
