= Denis Langlois =

Denis Langlois may refer to:

- Denis Langlois (director)
- Denis Langlois (race walker)
