= Broadcasting career of Johnny Weir =

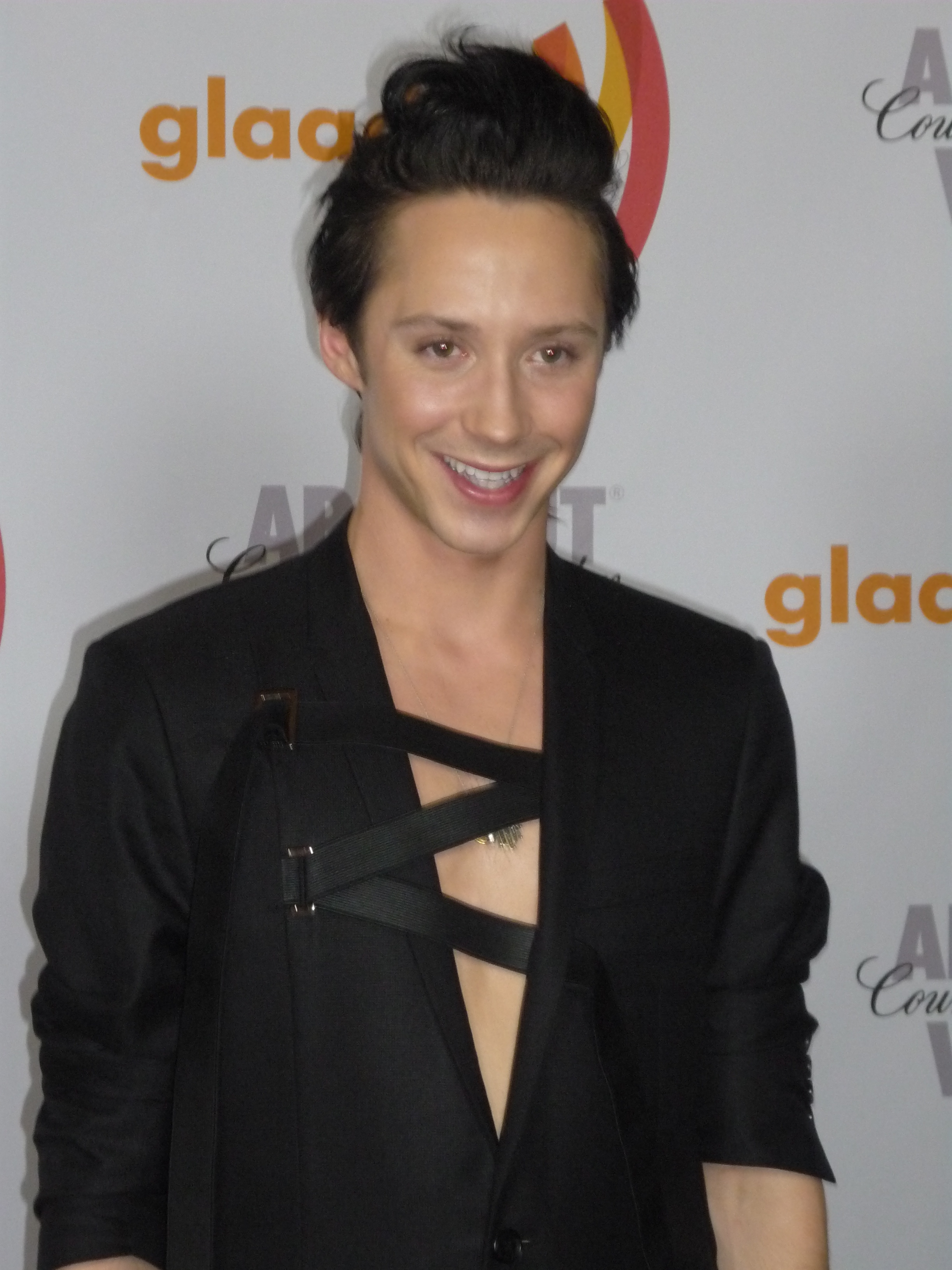
Johnny Weir, in 2020

The broadcasting career of American figure skater Johnny Weir began in October 2013, after he retired from figure skating competition and joined NBC as a figure skating analyst at the 2014 Winter Olympics in Sochi, Russia. He is a two-time Olympian (2006 and 2010 Winter Olympics), the 2008 World bronze medalist, a two-time Grand Prix Final bronze medalist, the 2001 World Junior Champion, and a three-time U.S. National champion (2004–2006).

Weir was teamed up with sports commentator Terry Gannon and fellow figure skater, Olympic gold medalist, and good friend Tara Lipinski; their instant comedic chemistry and harmony was a success and they have worked together ever since.They hosted the closing ceremonies in Pyeongchang, as well as for the 2020 Summer Olympics and for the 2022 Winter Olympics. They also commentated for the 2018 Winter Olympics, as well as for the 2022 Winter Olympics. Weir's commentating style was met with fixed responses from figure skating fans and skaters. Weir named fellow figure skater and commentator Dick Button as an influence on his commentating style

Weir and Lipinski were fashion analysts and correspondents for the Oscars, dog shows, the Kentucky Derby, the Super Bowl, and the 2016 Summer Olympics. Weir and Lipinski appeared on reality shows together and separately. He also appeared as a contestant on Dancing with the Stars in 2020.

== Broadcasting career ==
Johnny Weir began his broadcasting career In October 2013, after he retired from figure skating competition and joined NBC as a figure skating analyst at the 2014 Winter Olympics in Sochi, Russia. NBC teamed Weir up with sports commentator Terry Gannon and fellow figure skater, Olympic gold medalist, and good friend Tara Lipinski, as the network's second team of figure skating commentators for their daily live broadcasts. Weir worked with Gannon during the men's events, and Lipinski worked with Gannon during the women's events. After realizing they worked well together and after recognizing their "instant chemistry", they pitched the idea of the three working together to NBC; Lipinski stated that it "was sort of meant to be". According to sports writer Tom Weir, Weir, Lipinski, and Gannon "had instant comedic harmony, with their casual chatter and humorous asides playing amazingly well against the staunch and exacting backdrop of figure skating". Tom Weir also reported that the trio had generated the 10 best weekday daytime audiences in NBC's history.

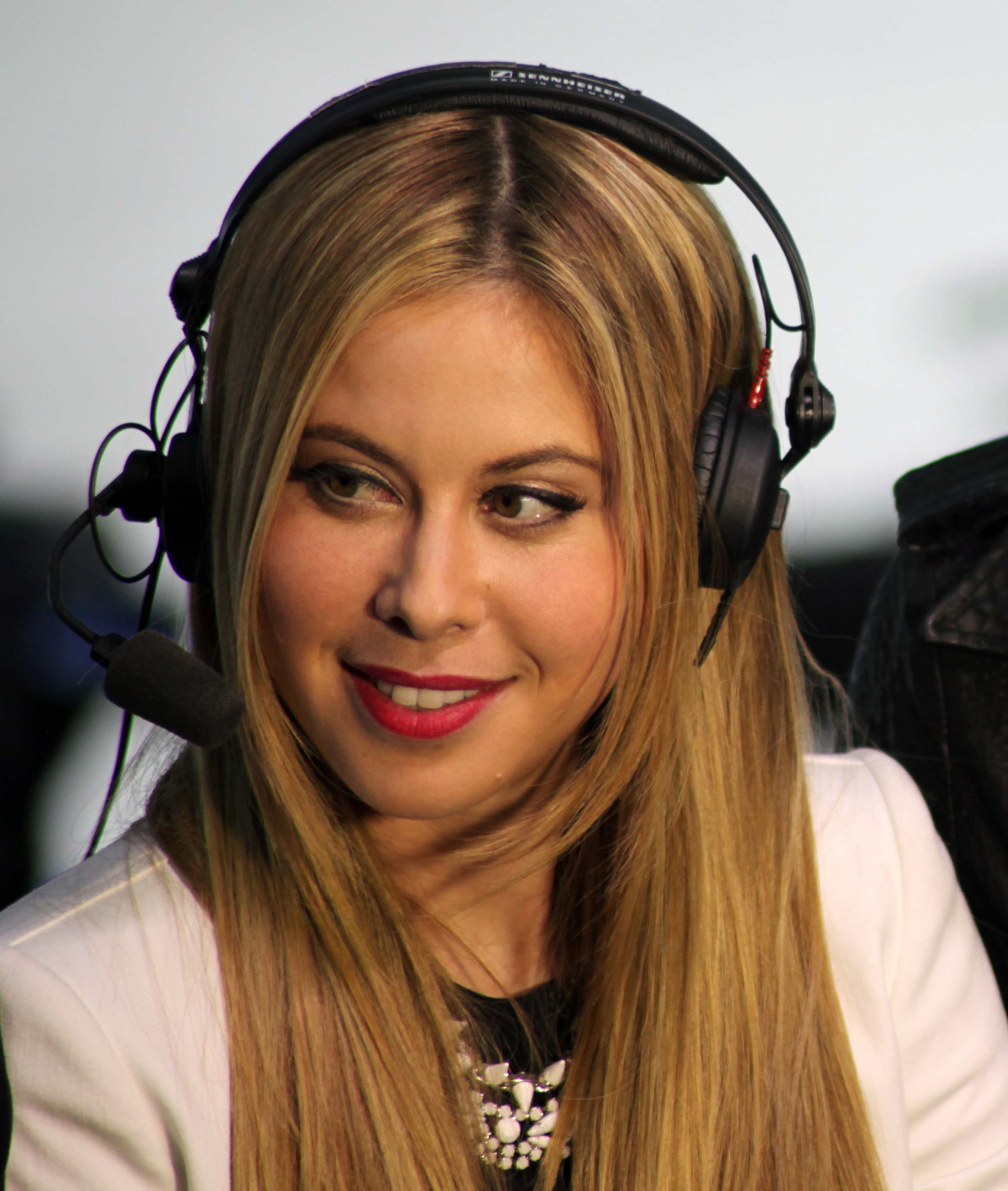
Weir's good friend and fellow commentator Tara Lipinski, 2014

In Sochi, Weir chose not to support calls for boycotting the Olympics in protest of Russia's anti-gay laws, and was criticized by both anti-gay and LGBTQ activists for his position. He appeared in the 2014 EPIX documentary To Russia with Love, which was about gay athletes in Russia and the U.S. The film, produced by Robert Redford and Sundance Productions, was filmed secretly during the Sochi Olympics and was nominated for a GLAAD Media Award. Weir later told USA Today that his period commentating in Sochi was a "horrible time" of his life; he was going through "a really nasty divorce" from his husband Victor Voronov, with Voronov submitting a defamation suit against Weir and much of their disputes being reported in the New York tabloids and TMZ. Weir depended on Lipinski for support in Sochi, which helped them bond. He said that she "helped push me through work. Somehow, at the same time my life was falling apart, we were crushing it at work, and we were winning hearts across America".

Weir, Lipinski, and Gannon were promoted to NBC's primary figure skating commentators, replacing Scott Hamilton, Sandra Bezic, and Tom Hammond. Weir, along with Lipinski and Gannon, was an analyst at the 2018 Winter Olympics. They covered the 2022 Winter Olympics, this time remotely from the NBC studios in Stamford, Connecticut, where they had covered events for many years, due to the rise of COVID-19 cases internationally and China's strict COVID-19 protocols, which NBC stated made it "too challenging" to send broadcast teams to Beijing in person. They also hosted the closing ceremonies in Pyeongchang (2018), Tokyo (2020), Beijing (2022), and Paris (2024).

Both Weir and Lipinski told GQ that they would bring dozens of suitcases to the competitions they announced, and would do their best to wear matching clothes and never the same outfit twice. By the 2018 Olympics, they brought every item of clothing they owned and would "sort it out" at the event. They also reported that they assisted Gannon with his on-air fashion choices.

Weir and Lipinski were hired by NBC's Access Hollywood in 2014, to analyze fashion during the red carpet at the Oscars. He served as a correspondent, with Lipinski, at the Beverly Hills Dog Show in 2017 and at the National Dog Show in 2015–2019. (In 2016, Weir owned a Japanese Chin named Tema.) Weir and Lipinski worked the Kentucky Derby in 2014–2018 (as "fashion and lifestyle experts" in 2016 and focusing on "lifestyle and celebrity content" in 2018). and were event reporters for the Super Bowl pre-game show in 2015 and 2017. They were named "culture correspondents" for the 2016 Summer Olympics. Weir, a self-professed fan of the Eurovision Song Contest, which he said had inspired him as a figure skater and that he had used its music in his programs, hosted and commentated the 2022 Eurovision semi-finals and finals for the streaming service Peacock in the U.S. He is set to do the same for the 2023 contest.

In 2018, the Washington Post reported that viewers' responses to Lipinski and Weir were mixed; some considered them "Olympic darlings–a one-stop shop for knowledge, sass and brass", while others found them "mean, obnoxious, and distracting". Scott Hamilton, who was replaced at NBC by Weir, Lipinski, and Gannon, called them a "phenomenon" and "such a breath of fresh air". GQ called their commentating style "a Gladwell-ian ability to demystify figure skating for the uninitiated and an extreme candor for which they've caught some heat". They tried to present figure skating in an accessible way to their viewers, keeping the more technical aspects of the sport to a minimum but emphasizing its "gossipy nuances". When they were criticized at the 2018 Olympics for being overly harsh, Weir responded, "I'm a commentator, not a ‘complimentator'", and added, "I would never be able to do my job without telling the truth about every aspect of figure skating and the performances you'll see".

Both Weir and Lipinski had "the good sense to stay silent when a skater is on an elegant and error-free roll" and Weir had "a gift for creating strong mental images with concise statements" while calling figure skating competitions. Weir cited Olympic champion and long-time analyst Dick Button as an influence in his own broadcasting style, especially Button's brutal honesty. Button told Olympic reporters, when asked what he thought about Weir's commentating style, that he thought that Weir was "very bright" and did not "overstep his bounds". Sports writer Bill Goodykoontz calls Weir and Lipinkski's enthusiasm for figure skating their "calling card". Although Goodykoontz states that Lipinski and Weir "never stop talking", they were uncharacteristically quiet while calling the short program of Kamila Valieva from the Russian Olympic Committee, who was allowed to compete despite failing a drug test prior to the 2022 Olympics. They chose to simply announce Valieva's jumps and to express their opinions that she should not have been allowed to compete afterwards. Weir later said it was "the hardest event I’ve ever had to cover".

== Other televised works ==
In 2018 and 2019, Weir and Lipinski hosted and appeared in a few shows on Food Network, including two seasons of Wedding Cake Challenge. In 2019, he and his brother Brian "Boz" Weir competed for charity on the Fox network reality show MasterChef. Also in 2019, Weir competed in the second season of The Masked Singer as "Egg". He was eliminated in the first week. In 2022 and 2023, he served as the U.S. commentator for the Eurovision Song Contest, which was broadcast on Peacock in the U.S. In 2023, Weir and Lipinski appeared on the reboot version of Night Court, playing scripted versions of themselves. Weir has hosted or appeared on celebrity editions of several other TV game shows, including Family Feud and Wheel of Fortune. In 2026, he and Lipinski appeared on The Traitors.

=== Dancing with the Stars ===
Weir was a contestant on Dancing with the Stars for the 29th season, which premiered on September 14, 2020. His partner was first-time pro dancer Britt Stewart, the first Black female pro dancer on the show. They reached the semi-finals and were the tenth couple eliminated.

Johnny Weir - Dancing with the Stars (season 29)
Week	Dance	Music	Judges' scores (Note: Individual judges' scores are listed in the following order: Carrie Ann Inaba, Derek Hough, Bruno Tonioli.)			Total score	Result
1	Cha-cha-cha	"Buttons" — The Pussycat Dolls	6	6	6	18	Safe
2	Tango	"Poker Face" — Lady Gaga	6	6	6	18	Safe
3	Rumba	"Reflection" — Christina Aguilera	8	8	8	24	Safe
4	Jive	"Crocodile Rock" — Elton John	9	9	8	26	Safe
5	Contemporary	"Total Eclipse of the Heart" — Bonnie Tyler	10	9	10	29	Safe
6	Salsa	"On the Floor" — Jennifer Lopez, feat. Pitbull	7	7	8	22	Bottom two
7	Viennese waltz	"Creep" — Vincint	9	9	9	27	Safe
8	Foxtrot	"Wonder" — Shawn Mendes	9	9	9	27	Safe
8	Viennese waltz (Dance relay)	"I Have Nothing" — Whitney Houston	—N/a			3 (Note: Weir received three bonus points for this dance relay.)	Safe
9	Quickstep	"Valerie" — Amy Winehouse, feat. Mark Ronson	10	10	10	30	Bottom two
9	Jive (Dance-off)	"Wake Me Up Before You Go-Go" — Wham!	Loser			0 (Note: Weir lost this dance-off to AJ McLean and received zero bonus points.)	Bottom two
10	Salsa	"X" — Jonas Brothers & Karol G	9	9	9	27	Eliminated
10	Jazz	"I Lived" — OneRepublic	10	10	10	30	Eliminated
