= Amnesia: The James Brighton Enigma =

- French: Amnésie, l'énigme James Brighton
- Directed by: Denis Langlois
- Written by: Bertrand Lachance; Denis Langlois
- Produced by: Bertrand Lachance; Denis Langlois
- Starring: Dusan Dukic; Karyne Lemieux; Louise Laprade; Norman Helms
- Cinematography: Larry Lynn
- Edited by: Denis Langlois
- Music by: Peter Xirogiannis
- Production companies: Castor & Pollux
- Distributed by: K Films Amérique; TLA Releasing
- Release date: September 26, 2005
- Running time: 90 minutes
- Country: Canada
- Languages: French; English

Amnesia: The James Brighton Enigma (French: Amnésie, l'énigme James Brighton) is a Canadian drama film, directed by Denis Langlois and released in 2005. The film dramatizes the true story of "James Brighton", a gay "mystery man" suffering from dissociative amnesia who was found naked behind a dumpster in Montreal in 1998, and was eventually confirmed as Matthew Honeycutt, a young heterosexual man from LaFollette, Tennessee, who was attempting to escape from his fundamentalist Christian family.

The film stars Dusan Dukic as Brighton/Honeycutt; Karyne Lemieux as Sylvie, a young woman who engages in trying to help solve the mystery of Brighton's identity; Louise Laprade as psychiatrist Geneviève Marler; and Norman Helms as Félix, a man who takes Brighton in as a house guest before his real identity is confirmed.

The film premiered on September 26, 2005, at Montreal's Cinema Quartier Latin, as a fundraising benefit gala for Gay Line/Gai Écoute, the city's helpline for LGBT people.

The film was cowinner with Tori Foster's documentary film 533 Statements of the award for Best Canadian Feature Film at the 2006 Inside Out Film and Video Festival.
