= A Paradise Too Far =

- French: Y’est où le paradis?
- Directed by: Denis Langlois
- Written by: Bertrand Lachance; Denis Langlois
- Produced by: Bertrand Lachance; Nicolas Comeau
- Starring: Maxime Dumontier; Marine Johnson
- Cinematography: Philippe Roy
- Edited by: Elric Robichon
- Music by: Marc Ouellette
- Production companies: 1976 Productions; Castor & Pollux
- Distributed by: Cinegro
- Release date: March 4, 2017
- Running time: 90 minutes
- Country: Canada
- Language: French

A Paradise Too Far (French: Y’est où le paradis?) is a Canadian drama film, directed by Denis Langlois and released in 2017. The film stars Maxime Dumontier and Marine Johnson as Samuel and Émilie, a brother and sister with intellectual disabilities who are placed with foster parents Jean (Patrick Renaud) and Diane (Élyse Aussant) following the death of their mother Mado (Véronique Gallant), but who lack a concrete understanding of the concept of death and run away from the foster home in an attempt to find Mado in Matchi-Manitou, where they believe she is.

The film's cast also includes Mathieu Thibodeau and Roseline Lamontagne as Samuel and Émilie in younger childhood flashbacks, as well as Geneviève Morin-Dupont, Marc Barakat, Gisèle Trépanier and Brad Gros-Louis in supporting roles.

The film was shot in winter 2016 in Laval, Oka, La Prairie and Notre-Dame-de-la-Merci, Quebec.

The film had its world premiere at the Miami Film Festival on March 4, 2017, and had its Canadian premiere in November at the Abitibi-Témiscamingue International Film Festival, before going into limited commercial release in Quebec on November 17.
