= The Escort (1996 film) =

1996 Canadian film by Denis Langlois

- Film poster
- French: L'Escorte
- Directed by: Denis Langlois
- Written by: Bertrand Lachance; Denis Langlois
- Produced by: Bertrand Lachance; Denis Langlois
- Starring: Paul-Antoine Taillefer; Éric Cabana; Robin Aubert; Patrice Coquereau
- Cinematography: Yves Beaudoin
- Edited by: Meiyen Chan; Denis Langlois
- Music by: Bertrand Chénier
- Production companies: Castor & Pollux
- Distributed by: Cinéma Libre
- Release date: September 11, 1996 (TIFF)
- Running time: 92 minutes
- Country: Canada
- Language: French

The Escort (French: L'Escorte) is a Canadian comedy-drama film, directed by Denis Langlois and released in 1996. Described by Langlois as "a comedy of manners in the age of AIDS", the films stars Paul-Antoine Taillefer and Éric Cabana as Philippe and Jean-Marc, a gay couple whose lives are thrown into turmoil when Steve (Robin Aubert), a young man whom they erroneously believed to be a stripper when he showed up at their party, becomes embroiled in their lives in unexpected ways, while Philippe's longtime friend Christian (Patrice Coquereau), Steve's lover, struggles to come out as HIV-positive.

The film premiered at the 1996 Toronto International Film Festival.
