= Laurie Townshend =

Canadian film director

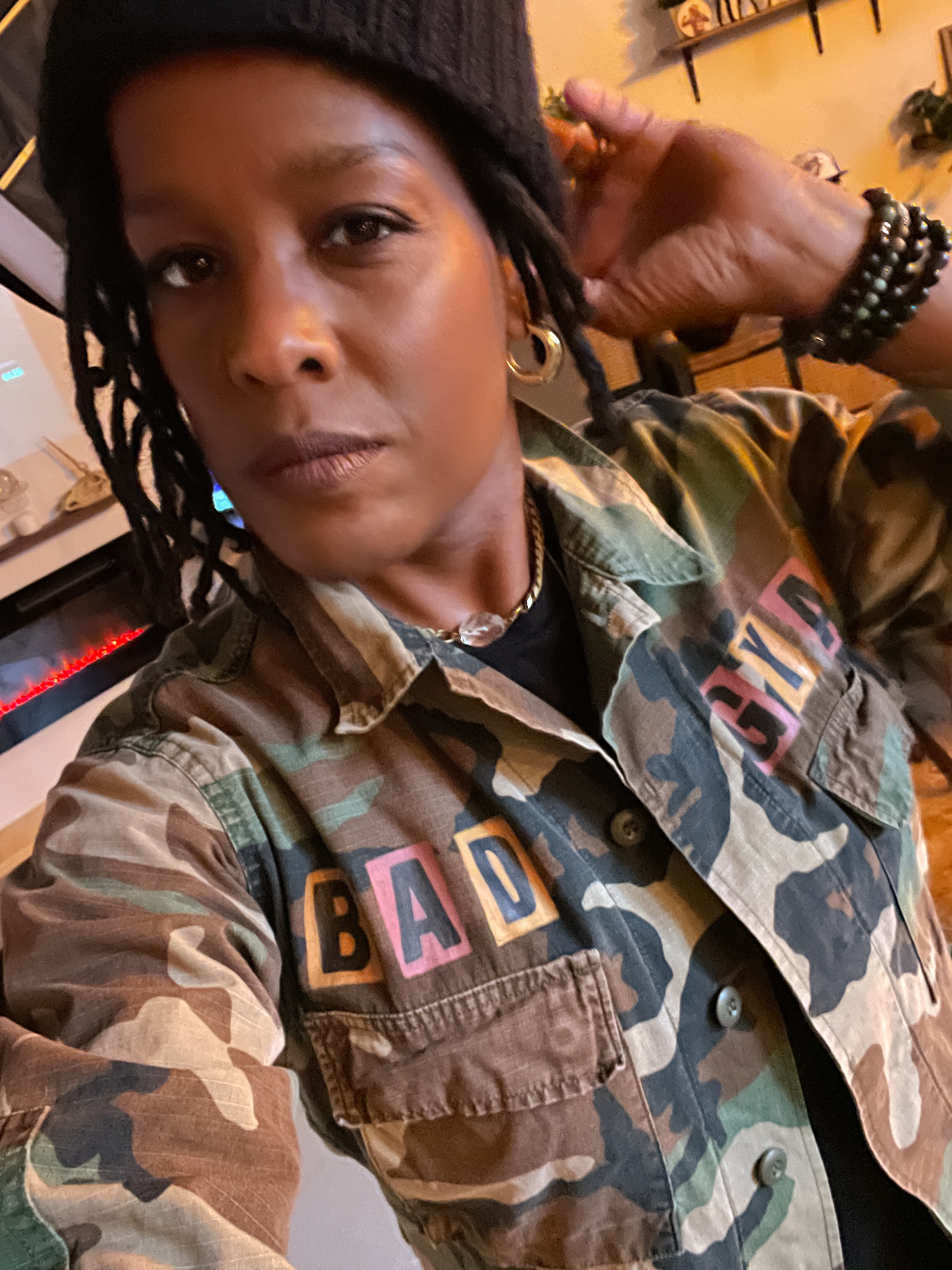
- Laurie Townshend
- Occupation: Film director
- Years active: 2010s–present
- Notable work: A Mother Apart

Laurie Townshend is a Canadian filmmaker, whose feature documentary debut A Mother Apart was released in 2024.

Townshend began her career as a middle school drama teacher at Sir Ernest MacMillan Senior Public School in Toronto, Ontario, where her students included Shamier Anderson and Stephan James. In 2013, she released the short drama film The Railpath Hero, and subsequently directed an episode of the 2016 documentary web series The Akua Benjamin Legacy Project.

A Mother Apart premiered at the 2024 Hot Docs Canadian International Documentary Festival. It subsequently screened at the 2024 Inside Out Film and Video Festival, where it won the juried awards for Best Canadian Film and Best First Feature Film, and the audience award for Best Documentary Film. It subsequently won the DGC Allan King Award for Best Documentary Film at the 2025 Directors Guild of Canada awards.
