= Skies Are Not Just Blue =

2019 Canadian documentary film

- Film poster
- Directed by: Lysandre Cosse-Tremblay
- Written by: Lysandre Cosse-Tremblay
- Starring: Yara; Monib; Tariq; A.
- Cinematography: Laurence Blais
- Edited by: Mélina Lemaire
- Music by: Émile Poulin
- Production company: UQAM
- Distributed by: Spira
- Release date: October 9, 2018 (FNC)
- Running time: 25 minutes
- Country: Canada
- Languages: English; Arabic; Persian

Skies Are Not Just Blue is a Canadian short documentary film, directed by Lysandre Cosse-Tremblay and released in 2018. The film profiles four young Muslim Canadians who identify as LGBTQ, and depicts how they navigate holding dual identities that are commonly perceived to be in irreconcilable conflict.

The film premiered at the 2018 Festival du nouveau cinéma, where it received an honorable mention from the jury for the Best Canadian Student Film award. It was subsequently screened at the 2019 Inside Out Film and Video Festival, where Cosse-Tremblay won the award for Emerging Canadian Artist. The film was also entered into the Iris Prize competition in 2019.
