= A Sexplanation =

US documentary film

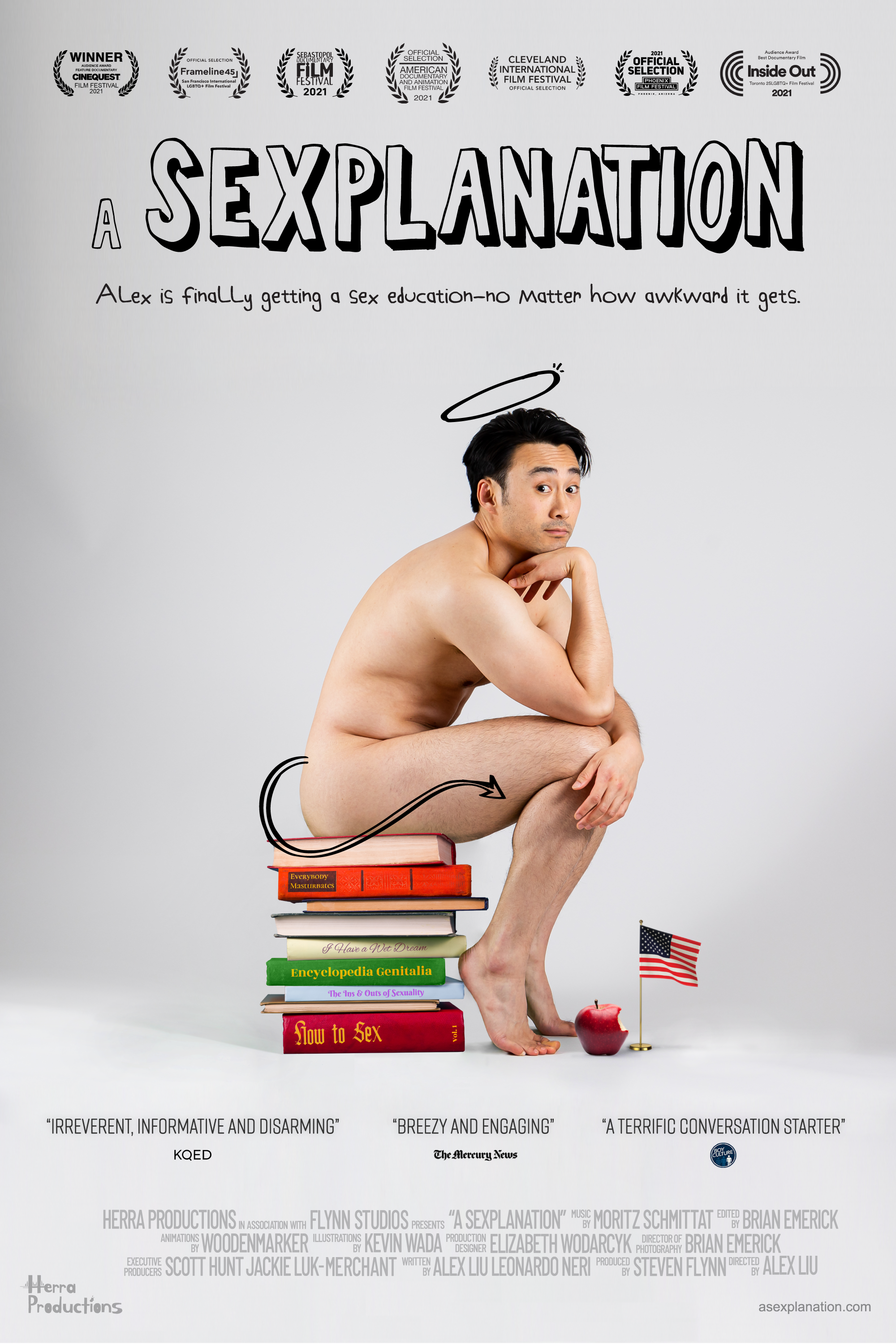
- Film poster
- Directed by: Alex Liu
- Written by: Alex Liu; Leonardo Neri
- Produced by: Steven Flynn
- Starring: Alex Liu
- Cinematography: Brian Emerick
- Edited by: Brian Emerick; Alex Liu
- Music by: Moritz Schmittat
- Production company: Herra Productions
- Release date: March 2021 (Cinequest)
- Running time: 81 minutes
- Country: United States
- Language: English

A Sexplanation is a 2021 American documentary film directed by and starring Alex Liu, a Chinese American independent filmmaker. The film, which explores issues concerning sexual stigma, shame, pleasure, and pride in the context of debates over comprehensive sex education, follows Liu as he travels the United States and Canada to interview researchers, therapists, educators, authors, political leaders, and activists, including those at the Kinsey Institute, Planned Parenthood, and San Francisco Sex Information.

== Cast ==
- Alex Liu (journalist and filmmaker) as the narrator and protagonist
- Dr. Lauri Betito (clinical psychologist, author, and syndicated radio host) as herself
- Dr. Barry Komisaruk (American psychologist and Distinguished Professor of Psychology at Rutgers University) as himself
- Dr. William Yarber (Provost Professor at Indiana University Bloomington School of Public Health, prominent AIDS/STD prevention researcher, and author) as himself
- Dr. Nan Wise (neuroscientist, sex therapist, and author) as herself
- Kristen Gilbert (Director of Education for Options for Sexual Health, Canada's largest non-profit provider of sexual health services) as herself
- Donal Godfrey (Irish Jesuit priest of the Society of Jesus, university chaplain, author, and activist) as himself
- Todd Weiler (Republican member of the Utah State Senate) as himself

== Release ==
A Sexplanation had its world premiere at the Cinequest Film & Creativity Festival from March 20–30, 2021 winning the Audience Award for Feature Documentary.

The film had its international premiere at the Inside Out LGBTQ Film Festival May 27-June 6, 2021 in Toronto, where it also won the Audience Award for Feature Documentary.

The film also aired on the American television channel Fuse TV beginning in May 2022.

== Reception ==
=== Critical response ===
A Sexplanation was a New York Times Critic's Pick with writer Claire Shaffer saying, "Liu lends a frankness and sensitivity to the topic that would make “A Sexplanation” suitable to be shown in a classroom..."

Phuong Le of The Guardian wrote, "Alex Liu makes for a charismatic guide to the sexual landscape of America, with an engaging curiosity to help demystify the birds and the bees... it sparkles with an engaging curiosity."

Noel Murray from The Los Angeles Times described the film as "an entertaining movie with admirable intentions, pushing the audience to rethink their presumptions about pleasure."

Randy Myers of The Mercury News wrote, "[Liu] makes a charming guide ... Breezy and engaging." KQED arts critic Michael Fox said "A Sexplanation is an irreverent, informative and disarming road trip ... and deserves to be disseminated as widely as possible." Pat Mullen of POV Magazine wrote the movie was "Fun, informative, and sex-positive ... A Sexplanation unabashedly puts the "d" in doc."

Gary Kramer from Salon reviewed the film saying, "Alex Liu's smart, lively, and thoughtful documentary about sex education — both his in particular and America's in general. Liu's goal is to talk honestly and even vulnerably, about sex, and he covers topics ranging from masturbation and pornography to taboo fantasies to demystify sex and the shame often associated with it. It is through his discussions with his own parents, as well as sex educators and researchers — and even a Catholic priest — that he normalizes dialogue about a topic most folks would prefer not to discuss. 'A Sexplanation' is certainly a conversation starter, and like the numerous interviewees, the ingratiating Liu treats the topic respectfully, and with a healthy curiosity, which is why it is so gratifying."

On the review aggregator website Rotten Tomatoes, the film holds an approval rating of 100% based on 27 reviews.

=== Accolades ===
Year	Award	Category	Result	Ref.
2021	Asian American International Film Festival	Audience Award for Best Documentary Feature	Won	
2021	Cinequest Film & Creativity Festival	Audience Award for Feature Documentary	Won	
2021	Cleveland International Film Festival	Ad Hoc Docs Competition	Nominated	
2021	DC Asian Pacific American Film Festival	Best Documentary Feature	Won	
2021	Honolulu Rainbow Film Festival	Best Documentary Feature	Won	
2021	InsideOut LGBTQ Film Festival	Audience Award for Best Documentary	Won	
2021	Phoenix Film Festival	Donor's Choice Competition Feature Film	Won	
2021	Red Rock Film Festival	Best Documentary Feature	Nominated	
2021	Reel Q Pittsburgh International LGBT Festival	Best Documentary Film	Won	
2021	São Paulo International Film Festival	New Directors Competition / Best Film	Nominated	
2021	Tallgrass Film Festival	Outstanding First Feature	Won	
2022	Paris International Film Festival	Best Documentary For Change / Audience Award	Won	
2023	The Queerties	Best Documentary	Nominated	
