= Faggot (film) =

2016 film

- French: Tapette
- Directed by: Olivier Perrier
- Written by: Olivier Perrier
- Produced by: Olivier Perrier; Guillaume Bibeau-Laviolette
- Starring: Robin L'Houmeau; Eliot Nault
- Cinematography: Émile Massie-Vanasse
- Edited by: Véronique Clément
- Production company: Avec Panache
- Release date: 11 December 2016 (Belgrade Queer Film Festival)
- Running time: 10 minutes
- Country: Canada
- Language: French

Faggot (French: Tapette) is a Canadian short drama film, directed by Olivier Perrier and released in 2016.

The film centres on Alex Girard (Robin L'Houmeau), a young junior hockey player in the Abitibi-Témiscamingue region of Quebec who is struggling with whether to come out as gay to his teammates.

Perrier, a film student at Concordia University at the time of making the film, won the Emerging Canadian Artist award at the 2017 Inside Out Film and Video Festival.
