= We Are the Radical Monarchs =

- Directed by: Linda Goldstein Knowlton
- Produced by: Katie Flint; Linda Goldstein Knowlton
- Cinematography: Clare Major
- Edited by: Arielle Amsalem; Katie Flint
- Music by: Gingger Shankar; William Stanbro
- Production company: Ladylike Films
- Release date: March 10, 2019 (SXSW)
- Running time: 95 minutes
- Country: United States
- Language: English

We Are the Radical Monarchs is an American documentary film, directed by Linda Goldstein Knowlton and released in 2019. The film profiles the Radical Monarchs, an organization which was founded in Oakland, California as an activist-oriented alternative to the Girl Scouts for young girls of color.

The film premiered at the 2019 South by Southwest festival. It was subsequently screened at the 2019 Inside Out Film and Video Festival, where it won the Audience Award for Best Documentary, and at the Seattle International Film Festival, where it won the award for Best Documentary.
