= Deep Inside Clint Star =

- Directed by: Clint Alberta
- Written by: Clint Alberta
- Produced by: Silva Basmajian
- Starring: Clint Alberta
- Cinematography: Marcos Arriaga
- Edited by: Katharine Asals
- Music by: James Cavalluzzo
- Production company: National Film Board of Canada
- Release date: June 18, 1999
- Running time: 89 minutes
- Country: Canada
- Language: English

Deep Inside Clint Star is a Canadian documentary film, directed by Clint Alberta and released in 1999. A first-person video essay, the film features Alberta, in the persona of a character named Clint Star, interviewing his own group of friends about their personal conceptions of racial and sexual identity.

The film had its theatrical premiere on June 18, 1999, as part of the Reel Aboriginal Film Series at Toronto's Harbourfront Centre. Later that same year, with the national launch of the Aboriginal Peoples Television Network, it was one of the first films ever broadcast by that network.

Vancouver Sun film critic Katherine Monk favourably reviewed the film, writing that "Keeping the camera pretty much fastened on his own navel, regardless of who he's shooting at any given moment, Star (a.k.a. Alberta) also achieves an interesting filmic stance as documentarist-participant-Dear Abby. It's exciting to watch anyone create his own artistic form, but here, the thrill is amplified tenfold as Star grapples with everything from technique to tell-all confessions before your very eyes."

The film won the Donald Brittain Award for best television documentary on a social or political topic at the 15th Gemini Awards in 2000. While producer Silva Basmajian was accepting the award, Alberta began to perform a traditional First Nations dance behind him, but was ushered off stage by security because they did not realize he was the filmmaker.
