= Sonia Godding Togobo =

Guyanese-Canadian documentary filmmaker

- Born: Georgetown, Guyana
- Occupations: Documentary filmmaker; film editor
- Known for: A Mother Apart (2024); CSA nomination for Best Editing (2025)

Sonia Godding Togobo is a Guyanese-Canadian documentary filmmaker and editor from Ajax, Ontario. She is most noted for her work as an editor on the 2024 documentary film A Mother Apart, for which she received a Canadian Screen Award nomination for Best Editing in a Documentary at the 13th Canadian Screen Awards in 2025.

== Early life ==
Sonia Godding Togobo was born in Georgetown, Guyana, and is the eldest of four children. Early in her childhood, her family moved to Toronto, Ontario.

== Career ==
As a director, she made her debut in 2012 with the film Adopted ID. She was also the writer of The Blind Couple from Mali, a forthcoming documentary film about musical duo Amadou & Mariam.
