= To Russia with Love (2014 film) =

2014 documentary about LGBT athletes at the Winter Olympics

- Film poster
- Directed by: Noam Gonick
- Written by: Noam Gonick
- Produced by: Jill Burkhart; Laina Cohn; Elle Flanders; Howard Gertler; Laura Michalchyshyn; Johnny Weir
- Narrated by: Jane Lynch
- Edited by: Jennifer Honn
- Music by: Kerry Muzzey
- Production companies: Little Punk; Public Studio; Sundance Productions
- Release date: October 29, 2014
- Running time: 91 minutes
- Countries: Canada; United States
- Language: English

To Russia with Love is a 2014 documentary film by Canadian director Noam Gonick. Shot in Sochi, Russia during the 2014 Winter Olympics, the film centres on the controversial Russian gay propaganda law, and the ethical dilemmas faced by openly LGBT athletes such as Johnny Weir, Belle Brockhoff, Anastasia Bucsis and Blake Skjellerup around whether to speak out against the law while competing in Russia.

The film was narrated by Jane Lynch, and also included interviews with Billie Jean King, Greg Louganis, Simona Meiler, Charline Labonté, Brian Burke, Mark Tewksbury, David Remnick, Stephen Fry and Jason Collins.

The film premiered on the Epix cable network in the United States in August 2014. It had its Canadian premiere at the Inside Out Film and Video Festival in 2015, and received selected other theatrical screenings before being broadcast by CBC Television.

The film received a GLAAD Media Award nomination for Outstanding Documentary at the 26th GLAAD Media Awards.
