= A Mother Apart =

2024 Canadian documentary film

- Directed by: Laurie Townshend
- Written by: Alison Duke; Laurie Townshend
- Produced by: Alison Duke; Ngardy Conteh George; Justine Pimlott
- Starring: Staceyann Chin
- Cinematography: Ashley Iris Gill; Gabriela Osio Vanden; Mrinal Desai
- Edited by: Sonia Godding Togobo
- Music by: Tom Third
- Production companies: National Film Board of Canada; Oya Media Group
- Release date: April 26, 2024 (Hot Docs)
- Running time: 89 minutes
- Country: Canada
- Language: English

A Mother Apart is a 2024 Canadian documentary film, directed by Laurie Townshend. The film profiles writer and activist Staceyann Chin, both in the context of her status as a daughter who was abandoned at a young age by her mother, and as a mother who has resolved to be more caring and attentive with her daughter than her own mother was with her.

According to Chin, she had been approached several times in the past to film her story, including by at least one unnamed filmmaker whom she was thankful that she had declined to work with because he had since been subjected to sexual harassment claims, but noted that she agreed to work with Townshend because Townshend was fully honest about being a first-time filmmaker without access to a lot of money, rather than "blowing smoke up her ass" about Hollywood connections or Netflix deals.

The film premiered at the 2024 Hot Docs Canadian International Documentary Festival, where producer Alison Duke received the Don Haig Award.

At the Cleveland International Film Festival 2025, A Mother Apart received the Groundbreaker Award, a juried prize for films addressing themes of diversity and/or social justice by a diverse filmmaker. The film was nominated for the 2026 GLAAD Media Award for Outstanding Documentary.

== Awards ==
Award	Date of ceremony	Category	Recipient(s)	Result	Ref.
Inside Out Film and Video Festival	2024	Best Canadian Film	Laurie Townshend	Won	
Inside Out Film and Video Festival	2024	Best First Feature Film	Laurie Townshend	Won	
Inside Out Film and Video Festival	2024	Audience Award, Documentary Film	Laurie Townshend	Won	
Canadian Screen Awards	June 1, 2025	Best Editing in a Documentary	Sonia Godding Togobo	Nominated	
Directors Guild of Canada	2025	DGC Allan King Award for Best Documentary Film	Laurie Townshend	Won	
GLAAD Media Awards	2026	Outstanding Documentary	A Mother Apart	Nominated	
