= Out in the Ring =

2022 film by Ry Levey

- Directed by: Ry Levey
- Written by: Ry Levey; Brad Webb
- Produced by: Ry Levey; Brad Webb
- Cinematography: Jahlen Barnes, Seth Biley, Michael Bruno, Ramsey Denison, Michael Galinsky, Jon Gourlay, Daniel Kullman, Justin McConnell, Alex Neubert, Paul Pratt, Adam Sekuler, Greg Sommer, Jonathan Sosa, Tom Swindell, Guerilla Wanderers
- Edited by: Brad Webb
- Music by: Scooter McCrae
- Production companies: RBL Films, Orama Filmworks
- Release date: June 3, 2022 (Inside Out)
- Running time: 105 minutes
- Country: Canada
- Language: English

Out in the Ring is a Canadian documentary film, directed by Ry Levey and released in 2022. The film is a history of LGBTQ representation in the sport of professional wrestling, featuring figures such as Chyna, Lisa Marie Varon, Nyla Rose, Chris Kanyon, Pat Patterson, Valerie Wyndham, Dani Jordyn, Cassandro, Charlie Morgan, Sandy Parker, Sonny Kiss, Pollo Del Mar, Sue Green, Dark Sheik and Wade Keller.

The film began development in the late 2010s and faced some production delays caused by the COVID-19 pandemic.

The film premiered in June 2022 at the Inside Out Film and Video Festival, where it won the juried award for Best Canadian Film.

== See also ==
- Category:LGBTQ professional wrestlers
