= Tori Foster =

Canadian artist and filmmaker

- Born: 1982 (age 43–44); Barrie, Ontario, Canada
- Occupations: Artist, filmmaker

Tori Foster (born 1982) is a Canadian artist and filmmaker, known for her new media works. She is most noted for her documentary film 533 Statements, which was cowinner with Denis Langlois' film Amnesia: The James Brighton Enigma of the award for Best Canadian Feature Film at the 2006 Inside Out Film and Video Festival.

== Academic career ==
Foster is an assistant professor of art at California State University, Northridge.

== See also ==
- List of female film and television directors
- List of lesbian filmmakers
- List of LGBT-related films directed by women
