= Making Scenes Film and Video Festival =

LGBTQ film festival in Ontario, Canada

The Making Scenes Film and Video Festival was an annual film festival in Ottawa, Ontario, Canada, active from 1992 to 2005. The festival programmed an annual lineup of LGBT film, alongside other arts and cultural events.

The event was created in 1992 by a small group of gay and lesbian film buffs after attending Toronto's inaugural Inside Out Film and Video Festival in 1991. Its launch saw some minor controversy over the city's approval of a municipal arts grant to the organizing committee, which some critics tried to connect to the city's denial of a grant to the long-running Kiwanis Music Festival. In its first two years the event was staged in the Alumni Auditorium at the University of Ottawa, while in 1994 it moved to the auditorium of the National Gallery of Canada. It later moved to other venues, including the World Exchange Plaza and the ByTowne Cinema.

In 1995, the organizers spoke to the press about the challenges they were having booking films for the festival, with popular LGBT-themed films such as When Night Is Falling, French Twist, Priest and The Sum of Us opting to bypass the LGBT film festival circuit in favour of mainstream commercial distribution.

Staged in late April to early May each year in its early years, the festival was moved to September in 1998 following feedback from postsecondary students at the University of Ottawa, Carleton University and Algonquin College that the spring scheduling left many students unable to attend the festival.

In 1999 the festival staged a special preview screening of Thom Fitzgerald's film Beefcake, which had already screened at a couple of film festivals in the United States but had not yet opened theatrically in Canada, as a fundraiser several months before the regular festival.

The festival ended operations in 2005. In its place, Inside Out launched an Ottawa edition in 2007.
