= The Golden Pin =

- Directed by: Cuong Ngo
- Written by: Matt Guerin, Cuong Ngo
- Produced by: Igor Szczurko
- Cinematography: Stu Marks
- Release date: May 20, 2009 (Inside Out)
- Running time: 15 minutes
- Country: Canada
- Language: English

The Golden Pin is a 2009 short film directed by Cuong Ngo about a young Vietnamese-Canadian swimmer who struggles between the expectations of family and the demands of his heart.

== Plot ==
Set in Canada's multicultural milieu, Long, an only child, has kept his homosexuality a secret from his parents. Under pressure from his father to continue the family line, Long proposes to his long-time girlfriend Vanessa, much to the chagrin of Long's swim teammate Ryan, who confronts Long about his true feelings at their next swim practice. Sensing her son's growing distress, Long's mother tells him about a painful choice she made just before she married his father.

== Awards ==
The film had its world premiere at the Toronto Inside Out Film and Video Festival on May 20, 2009. It won Best Canadian Short at the festival. The film also screened in November 2009 at the Vancouver Asian Film Festival, where it took second place in the 2009 National Film Board Best Canadian Short Award. In March 2010, the film was nominated by the Canadian Society of Cinematographers in the Student Cinematography category. In December 2010, the film was selected as one of 12 finalists in TLA Releasing's 2010 Short Film Contest. Members of the public voted online for their favourites. On January 4, 2011, TLA announced The Golden Pin won second runner up.
