= Sisters (2024 film) =

2024 American comedy film

- Directed by: Susie Yankou
- Written by: Susie Yankou
- Produced by: Katie Sue Escher; Sarah Khasrovi; Riley Scott; Susie Yankou
- Starring: Susie Yankou; Sarah Khasrovi; Kausar Mohammed
- Cinematography: Jon Corum
- Release date: May 25, 2024 (Inside Out)
- Running time: 88 minutes
- Country: United States
- Language: English

Sisters is an American comedy film, directed by Susie Yankou and released in 2024. The film stars Yankou and Sarah Khasrovi as Lou and Esther, friends whose close sisterly relationship is tested when Lou discovers at her father's funeral that she has a real half-sister named Priya (Kausar Mohammed) whom she never knew, and begins to prioritize getting to know Priya over her friendship with Esther.

The cast also includes Anna Garcia, Shila Ommi, Pam Murphy, Peter Banifaz, Daniel Rashid, Langlee Marr, Nabeel Muscatwalla, Jasmine Elist, Jenny Buchanan and Rob Nagle.

Yankou, a Canadian who moved to Los Angeles, California, in the 2010s to study screenwriting at the USC School of Cinematic Arts, received a Re:Focus grant from the Inside Out Film and Video Festival in 2022 to assist in the film's production.

The film premiered in May 2024 at Inside Out, where it won the audience award for Best Feature Film.

== Cast ==
- Shila Ommi as Nazanin
- Anna Garcia as Raffa
- Pam Murphy as Aunt Jenny
- Kausar Mohammed as Priya Mangal
- Rob Nagle as George Pappas
- Peter Banifaz as Bahram
- Daniel Rashid as PJ
- Jacquis Neal as Ian
- Nabeel Muscatwalla as Omid
- Langlee Marr as Ella
