= How Not to Date While Trans =

How Not To Date While Trans
- Poster
- Directed by: Nyala Moon
- Written by: Nyala Moon
- Produced by: Eileen Makak; Chien-Yu Wang
- Cinematography: Susan Mei
- Edited by: Nyala Moon
- Music by: Chanell Crichlow
- Release date: April 6, 2022
- Running time: 14 minutes
- Country: United States
- Language: English

How Not To Date While Trans is a short film created by Nyala Moon. It is a dark comedy about a trans woman navigating the dating world.

It premiered in 2022 and has been in over 30 festivals. The film has won awards from Iris Prize, NewFest, InsideOut Toronto, Translations: Seattle Trans Film Festival, and Milwaukee International Film Festival.

== Plot ==
The camera pans from an affectionate couple in the park to a woman, Andie, who feels that she could never be like them because she is transgender. Andie then introduces herself and acknowledges how dangerous it is to not directly tell her dates that she is trans, which leads to a three-date rule. Andie explains how she weeds out incompatible dates, presented similarly to running a game show. A montage ensues in which she asks each date about LGBT topics, only to receive some unsavory answers. After escaping one date, she says that the third date is when she mentions that she is transgender. Andie leads Date Guy 1 to sit, asking him about social issues regarding transgender people. He goes on to explain that people should be able to be themselves and that transgender people are being treated horribly. She asks him how he would feel if he dated a trans woman, then tells him that she herself is transgender. He rejects her and leaves. Andie then meets up with Random Stud Guy, with the intent to have sex with him. Andie explains that she is “post-op” and counters that she doesn't need to inform him that she is trans because he is a one-night stand and there isn't a noticeable difference. Andie attempts to leave and ghost him, but he wakes up and tries to convince Andie to stay. Random Stud Guy attempts to get to know her better, and she tries to ward him off by saying he is not her type. Disappointed, he helps her get dressed. She faces the mirror and visualizes herself as a male. She leaves, with voiceover playing of Andie ruminating on her place in society.

== Background ==
In 2023, Filmmaker magazine named Nyala Moon as one of the top 25 faces of independent film. Before she pursued a career in filmmaking, Moon worked in a nonprofit community to help other transgender and queer people of color access of healthcare necessities. She believes that her purpose in life is to assist in the creation of understanding marginalized communities and overall media outlook. The dates in the film were based on real-life people, with a google doc containing the most memorable experiences. Moon is drawn to comedy in order to subvert trans women often being portrayed as a joke in media, as well as making it easier to relate and empathize not only with her characters but marginalized groups as well.

== Awards ==
- Iris Prize (2022)
- Newfest Grand Jury Best Short Film (2022)
- Newfest New Voices Filmmaker Grant (2022)
- Audience Award for Best Short Film, Inside Out Toronto LGBT Film Festival (2022)
- Best Narrative Short Winner, Translations: Seattle Trans Film Festival (2022)
- Shorts Jury Award, Milwaukee International Film Festival (2023)
- Frameline's Voices Short Program (2023)

== Cast ==
- Nyala Moon as Andie
- Juliana Aidén Martinez as Kissing Couple 1
- Malachi Beasley as Kissing Couple 2
- Tyler Brooks as Tall Guy
- Joshua Gray as Date Guy 1
- Patrick John Boyle as Date Guy 2
- Hassan Farrow as Date Guy 3
- Michael Kaurene as Date Guy 4
- Robert Cooper as Date Guy 5
- Javan Nelson as Date Guy 6
- Matthew Taylor Zuniga as Random Stud Guy
