= Hey, Happy! =

2000 film directed by Noam Gonick

- Directed by: Noam Gonick
- Written by: Noam Gonick
- Produced by: Noam Gonick; Laura Michalchyshyn
- Starring: Jérémie Yuen; Craig Aftanis; Clayton Godson
- Cinematography: Paul Suderman
- Edited by: Bruce Little
- Production company: Big Daddy Beer Guts
- Distributed by: Mongrel Media
- Release date: January 27, 2001 (Sundance)
- Running time: 75 minutes
- Country: Canada
- Language: English

Hey, Happy! is a Canadian science fiction comedy film, directed by Noam Gonick and released in 2001.

Set in a countercultural squatter camp on the outskirts of Winnipeg, the film stars Jérémie Yuen as Sabu, a bisexual rave disc jockey on a quest to have sex with 2,000 men before the imminent apocalyptic flood of the Red River. After successfully bedding 1,999 men, he sets his sights on Happy (Craig Aftanis) as his final conquest, only to be drawn into a love triangle with rival Spanky (Lexi Tronic, credited as Clayton Godson).

The film premiered at the 2001 Sundance Film Festival. It had its Canadian premiere at the Inside Out Film and Video Festival, where it won the award for Best Canadian Film. In its subsequent Canadian theatrical release, it was screened with Guy Maddin's short film The Heart of the World.

In 2023, Telefilm Canada announced that the film was one of 23 titles that will be digitally restored under its new Canadian Cinema Reignited program to preserve classic Canadian films.

== Critical response ==
Writing for the Toronto Star, Geoff Pevere wrote that "If Gonick's first feature film (he directed the award-winning documentary about filmmaker Guy Maddin called Waiting for Twilight) registers anything with prairie twilight clarity, it's expertly orchestrated chaos: as individually anarchic as any of the movie's set-pieces may seem- and the one involving "Magnolia Thunderpussy's Filipino witchcraft shack" is merely one- they're rendered with a cinematic skill that gives the rules behind the gameplaying away. Whether or not you "get" this flagrantly anti-linear movie, there's no missing the artfulness behind it."

For the National Post, Stephen Cole panned the film, writing that "none of [its cast], amateurs all, show any aptitude for performing (Godson acts about as well as Sex Pistol Sid Vicious played bass), although inarticulate Yuen, who is forever pulling the hair out of his eyes, is an intriguing camera subject-hunk in the tradition of Warhol's Joe Dallesandro."

In his 2006 book The Romance of Transgression in Canada: Queering Sexualities, Nations, Cinemas, Thomas Waugh wrote that the film was essentially a postmodern update of John Greyson's 1996 film Lilies, "but this one substitutes upbeat prairie rave euphoria for Quebec martyr melodrama".
