= Juliana Aidén Martinez =

American actress

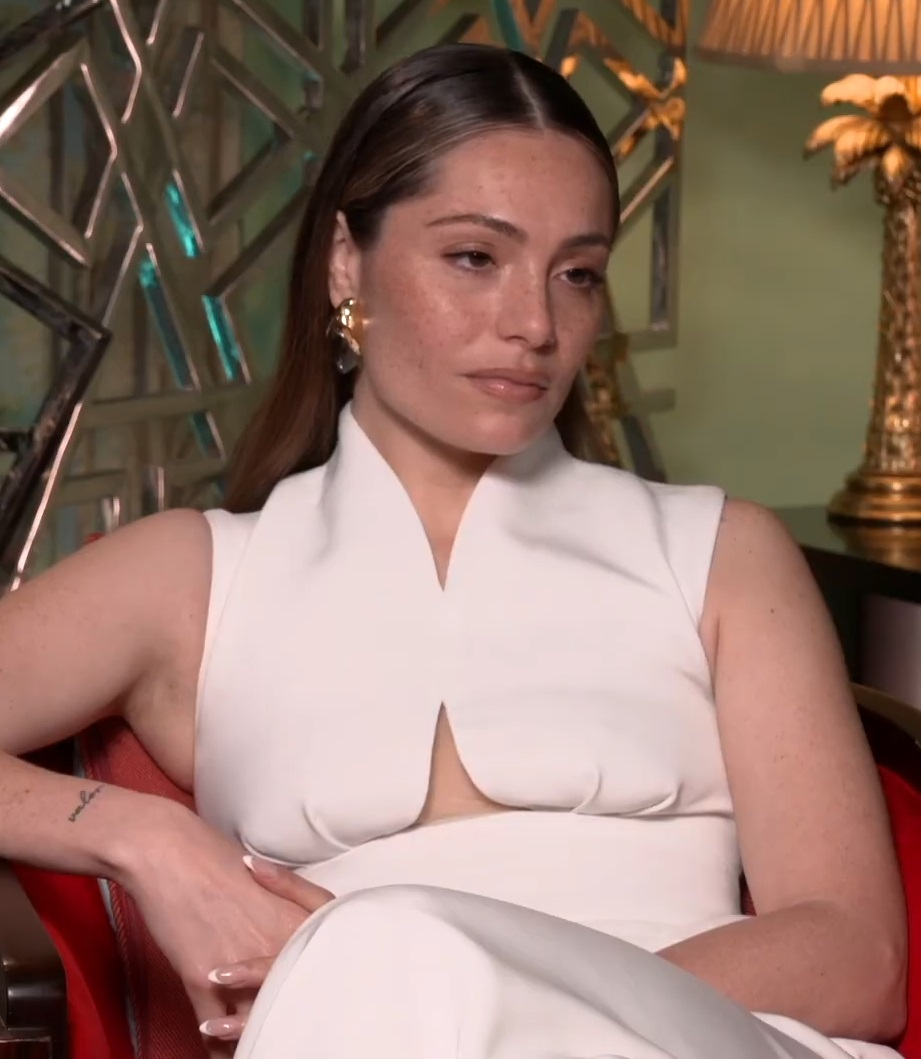
- Martinez in 2024
- Born: Miami, Florida, U.S
- Occupation: Actress
- Years active: 2014–present

Juliana Aidén Martinez is an American actress.

== Life and career ==
Martinez was born in Miami, Florida, to a Colombian father and a Polish-Jewish mother and the first years of her life she grew up in Colombia before she and her parents moved back to Miami. She attended Yale University and graduated from the David Geffen School of Drama at Yale University in 2020. She began her career appearing in episodes of television series The Mysteries of Laura, Prodigal Son and The Blacklist. She also appeared in films Tar Pit (2015) and Boundary (2022).

In 2024, Martinez starred in the Netflix miniseries Griselda playing the role of agent June Hawkins receiving Imagen Award nomination for Best Supporting Actress on television. Later in 2024, she guest-starred in an episode of ABC series 9-1-1 and was cast as a series regular for season 26 of the NBC police drama series Law & Order: Special Victims Unit, playing the role of Junior Detective Kate Silva. After one season she left the series and joined another Dick Wolf series, FBI playing Special Agent Eva Ramos.

== Filmography ==
=== Film ===
Year	Title	Role	Notes
2015	Tar Pit	Michelle	
2022	How Not to Date While Trans	Kissing Couple 1	Short film
2022	Boundary	Emily Massey	
2023	They Come from the Sky	Windwillow	Short film
2025	Strangers on A Beach	Vicki	Short film

=== Television ===
Year	Title	Role	Notes
2014	The Mysteries of Laura	Faith McGowan	Episode: "The Mystery of the Biker Bar"
2021	Prodigal Son	Sister Agnes	Episode: "Speak of the Devil"
2021	The Blacklist	Silvina	Episode: "The Fribourg Confidence (No. 140)"
2024	Griselda	June Hawkins	Miniseries; Nominated—Imagen Award for Best Supporting Actress on Television
2024	9-1-1	Fernanda	Episode: "Step Nine"
2024–2025	Law & Order: Special Victims Unit	Junior Detective Kate Silva	Series regular (season 26); 22 episodes
2025	Law & Order	Junior Detective Kate Silva	Episode: "Play with Fire Part 1"
2025–present	FBI	Special Agent Eva Ramos	Series regular (season 8)
