= Jules of Light and Dark =

2018 American drama film

- Theatrical Poster
- Directed by: Daniel Laabs
- Written by: Daniel Laabs
- Produced by: Jeff Walker; Liz Cardenas; Russell Sheaffer; Daniel Laabs; Judd Myers; Cameron Bruce Nelson
- Starring: Tallie Medel; Robert Longstreet; Betsy Holt
- Cinematography: Noe Medrano Jr.
- Edited by: Daniel Laabs; Judd Myers
- Music by: Brent Sluder
- Production companies: Hungry Bear Productions; Artless Media
- Distributed by: Wolfe Releasing
- Release date: October 20, 2018 (NewFest)
- Running time: 90 minutes
- Country: United States
- Language: English

Jules of Light and Dark is a 2018 American drama film directed by Daniel Laabs. It was screened at NewFest's 2018 film festival where it won the Grand Jury Prize for Best U.S. Narrative Feature.

== Plot ==
Two young lovers, Maya and Jules, are found wrecked on the side of the road after a party by a loner roughneck, Freddy. During rehab, their relationship falls apart, and Maya forms an unlikely friendship with Freddy.

== Cast ==
- Tallie Medel as Maya
- Robert Longstreet as Freddy
- Betsy Holt as Jules
- Jonathan Miles Howard as David
- Liz Cardenas as Andrea
- Rafael Villegas as Luis

== Reception ==
Jules of Light and Dark has been well-received at various film festivals, including NewFest, Outfest, and Austin Film Festival. Stephen Saito wrote “Jules of Light and Dark is the rare film where you not only witness a meaningful change for the characters, but suspect they’ll continue to evolve long after the cameras stop rolling, if for no other reason than you feel as if you’ve experienced a change yourself from seeing it."
