= Susie Yankou =

Canadian film director

Susie Yankou is a Canadian film director and screenwriter currently working in the United States, whose debut feature film Sisters premiered in 2024.

Originally from Toronto, Ontario, as a high school student her goal was to study screenwriting at the USC School of Cinematic Arts in Los Angeles, California. Although she was accepted into the program, the $55,000 tuition was prohibitively expensive for her family, so she launched her own fundraising initiative, baking cookies to sell twice a week at the Distillery District and Riverdale farmer's markets.

In California she created and acted in the web series 101 Ways to Get Rejected prior to working on Sisters as her feature directorial debut.

Sisters received a Re:Focus grant from the Inside Out Film and Video Festival in 2022 to assist in the film's production. It premiered in May 2024 at Inside Out, where it won the audience award for Best Feature Film.
