= 533 Statements =

2006 Canadian documentary film

- Directed by: Tori Foster
- Release date: May 2006 (Inside Out)
- Running time: 75 minutes
- Country: Canada
- Language: English

533 Statements is a 2006 Canadian documentary film directed by Tori Foster. The film features Foster travelling across Canada to interview various lesbian and transgender women in cities and towns across the country.

The film premiered at the 2006 Inside Out Film and Video Festival, where it was co-winner with Denis Langlois's film Amnesia: The James Brighton Enigma of the award for Best Canadian Feature Film.
