= Miss 501: A Portrait of Luck =

- Directed by: Jules Karatechamp
- Produced by: Jules Karatechamp
- Starring: Burger
- Cinematography: Jeff Sterne
- Edited by: Katharine Asals
- Music by: Meagan Roberts
- Production company: Karatechamp
- Release date: January 2002 (Sundance)
- Running time: 82 minutes
- Country: Canada
- Language: English

Miss 501: A Portrait of Luck is a Canadian documentary film, directed by Clint Morrill under the pseudonym "Jules Karatechamp" and released in 2002. The film centres on Burger, a drag queen who is coming out of retirement to compete in the "Miss 501" drag pageant at Toronto's Bar 501.

The film premiered at the 2002 Sundance Film Festival. Morrill committed suicide a month after its premiere.

The film was posthumously screened at the 2002 Inside Out Film and Video Festival, where it won the juried award for Best Canadian Film.

In June 2026, the film received a retrospective screening at the TIFF Lightbox to mark National Indigenous Peoples Day.
