= Inside Out Film and Video Festival =

LGBTQ film festival in Ontario, Canada

Coordinates: 43.64659°N 79.39035°W

- Location: Toronto and Ottawa, Ontario, Canada
- Founded: 1991 (Toronto); 2007 (Ottawa)
- Festival date: May (Toronto); October (Ottawa)
- Language: English
- Website: www.insideout.ca

The Inside Out Film and Video Festival (formerly, Inside Out Lesbian and Gay Film and Video Festival), also known as the Inside Out LGBT or LGBTQ Film Festival, is an annual Canadian film festival, which presents a program of LGBT-related film. The festival is staged in both Toronto and Ottawa. Founded in 1991, the festival is now the largest of its kind in Canada. Deadline dubbed it "Canada’s foremost LGBTQ film festival."

The organization also presents a series of film screenings throughout the year outside of the dedicated festival, as well as a touring program of short film screenings in smaller towns and cities within Southern Ontario.

The festival's current executive director is Carly Beath, who joined the festival in January 2026. Prior heads of the event included Lauren Howes and Andria Wilson.

== Toronto LGBT Film Festival ==
First held at Toronto's Euclid Theatre in 1991, Inside Out celebrated its festival with a small community of people who yearned to see film and video created by and about lesbians, gays, bisexuals, and transgender people. The festival was briefly the subject of controversy in 1993, when Metro Toronto council refused an arts grant to support the 1994 festival on the grounds of "community standards", even though the council had given grants to the festival in both 1991 and 1992 without issue. The festival was able to make up the lost funding that year when numerous arts organizations in the city, including the Art Gallery of Ontario, the Toronto International Film Festival, the National Ballet School, Tarragon Theatre, Theatre Passe Muraille, and the Danny Grossman Dance Company made donations to the festival.

The festival has since expanded to incorporate a variety of programs related to the promotion and development of LGBT films and filmmakers in Canada. Currently the largest event of its kind in Canada, Deadline dubbed it "Canada’s foremost LGBTQ film festival." Previously staged at a variety of venues in Toronto, the festival is now staged at the TIFF Bell Lightbox.

Since 2009, RBC Royal Bank has served as the presenting sponsor of the Toronto Festival. The festival bills itself as "a not-for-profit registered charity that exists to challenge attitudes and change lives through the promotion, production and exhibition of film made by and about lesbian, gay, bisexual and trans (LGBT) people of all ages, races and abilities."

In 2016, a number of local activists launched the Toronto Queer Film Festival, an alternative intended for filmmakers and audiences who perceive Inside Out's current programming as too commercialized and mainstream.

In March 2020, the festival organizers announced that due to the COVID-19 pandemic in Canada, the 2020 festival, normally scheduled for May, would be postponed to October. In July, they announced that the Toronto and Ottawa events would be combined into a single digital event. Due to the unique online nature of the event, the winners of the juried awards were announced at the beginning of the festival, as a tool to help publicize the winners during the festival, although audience-voted awards were still announced after the festival's conclusion.

The 2021 festival returned to the event's traditional scheduling in late May, although it was still staged online. The event was available to viewers throughout Ontario; the films in the Spotlight on Canada program were screened for free through a sponsorship agreement with the Canadian Broadcasting Corporation.

The online platform that was used for both the 2020 and 2021 festivals is also planned to remain in permanent operation, both as a year-round distribution platform for LGBTQ films and as an additional accessibility option once the festival is able to return to traditional physical screenings.

== Ottawa LGBT Film Festival ==
In 2007, the Inside Out festival expanded to Ottawa, soon after the demise of the city's earlier Making Scenes Film and Video Festival. Originally presented at the ByTowne Cinema, since 2016 the event has been staged at the National Gallery of Canada.

In 2009, the festival faced controversy when the Canada Border Services Agency impounded prints of the films Patrik, Age 1.5, I Can't Think Straight, and Clapham Junction that were en route to the festival, even though all three films had previously been screened elsewhere in Canada without incident.

== Other programs ==
In addition to the annual film festival events, the Inside Out organization also offers a number of dedicated training and funding programs to foster the creation of LGBT-themed film in Canada.

In 1998, with the support of Charles Street Video, Inside Out initiated the Queer Video Mentorship Project to provide opportunities for youth to learn video production in a supportive atmosphere. Queer youth under the age of 25 are mentored through the process of making their first videos, from storyboarding and shooting to post-production and editing. In celebration of the festival's 20th anniversary in 2010, Inside Out expanded this into a multi-generational program bringing together LGBT youth and seniors over the age of 55. To date, close to 100 new artists have created work through the project. The works are screened at the festival and many go on to play at festivals around the globe. Each year, the works are compiled and distributed free to schools and community organizations.

In 2001, Inside Out launched the inaugural John Bailey Film and Video Completion Fund. Named in recognition of the contribution of a longtime Inside Out supporter and advisory board member, the fund awards grants ranging from $500 to $2,000 to Canadian filmmakers with work in the final stages of production.

Inaugurated in 2002, the Mark S. Bonham Scholarship for Queer Studies in Film and Video awards a $5,000 cash scholarship to a Canadian student who identifies as lesbian, gay, bisexual or transgender, to pursue post-secondary studies in the field of film or video. The first scholarship was awarded in September 2002 to Adam Garnet Jones from Vancouver. Subsequent recipients were Mary Fogarty, Christopher Sanchez, Jung Kim, Cam Matamoros, Jo Simalaya Alcampo, Rachel Smyth, and Jordan Tannahill.

In 2018, the festival launched the Focus Fund to support work by LGBTQ female and non-binary filmmakers. It also organizes an annual Finance Forum, providing an opportunity for emerging filmmakers to pitch LGBT-related projects in development to potential production funders.

In 2019, the festival partnered with streaming service Crave as a branding partner on the service's new portal for LGBTQ film and television content, as well as launching a partnership with Netflix to support the development and funding of new LGBTQ-oriented film and television content in Canada.

In 2020, through the Focus Fund, the festival launched a special emergency relief fund, offering grants of up to $2,500 to projects impacted by the COVID-19 pandemic. The festival was also one of the key partners, alongside Outfest Los Angeles, the Frameline Film Festival, and the New York Lesbian, Gay, Bisexual, & Transgender Film Festival, in launching the North American Queer Festival Alliance, an initiative to further publicize and promote LGBT film.

== Inside Out Arts Endowment Fund ==
The Inside Out Arts Endowment Fund was established in December 2001 through the Ontario Arts Foundation to provide a stable base of funding for Inside Out in the future. The fund was created thanks to a generous founding gift from Mark Bonham of $200,000, and it is currently valued at close to $300,000. Supporters of Inside Out can make tax-deductible donations specifically to the Endowment Fund.

== Awards ==
=== Audience Award for Best Feature Film ===
Year	Film	Director	Ref
1998	Everything Will Be Fine (Alles wird gut)	Angelina Maccarone	
1999	Better Than Chocolate	Anne Wheeler	
2000	The Adventures of Felix (Drôle de Félix)	Olivier Ducastel, Jacques Martineau	
2001	Big Eden	Thomas Bezucha	
2002	Gypsy 83	Todd Stephens	
2003	Madame Satã	Karim Aïnouz	
2004	Latter Days	C. Jay Cox	
2005	Saving Face	Alice Wu	
2006	A Love to Hide	Christian Faure	
2007	The Bubble	Eytan Fox	
2008	Were the World Mine	Tom Gustafson	
2009	The Baby Formula	Alison Reid	
2010	The Secret Diaries of Miss Anne Lister	James Kent	
2011	Weekend	Andrew Haigh	
2012	Margarita	Dominique Cardona, Laurie Colbert	
2013	Reaching for the Moon	Bruno Barreto	
2014	Tru Love	Kate Johnston, Shauna MacDonald	
2015	4th Man Out	Andrew Nackman	
2016	Angry Indian Goddesses	Pan Nalin	
2017	Sisterhood	Tracy Choi	
2018	White Rabbit	Daryl Wein	
2019	Billie and Emma	Samantha Lee	
2020	Gossamer Folds	Lisa Donato	
2021	Love, Spells and All That	Ümit Ünal	
2022	We Will Never Belong	Amelia Eloisa	
2023	I Used to Be Funny	Ally Pankiw	
2024	Sisters	Susie Yankou	
2025	Cactus Pears (Sabar Bonda)	Rohan Kanawade	
2026	I Come Home	Glen Wood	

=== Audience Award for Best Documentary Film ===
Year	Film	Director	Ref
1998	The Brandon Teena Story	Susan Muska, Greta Olafsdottir	
1999	I Know a Place	Roy Mitchell	
2000	Living with Pride: Ruth C. Ellis @ 100	Yvonne Welbon	
2001	Queen of the Whole Wide World	Roger Hyde	
2002	Ruthie and Connie: Every Room in the House	Deborah Dickson	
2003	Children of the Crocodile	Marsha Emerman	
2004	Superstar in a Housedress	Craig B. Highberger	
2005	Fag Hags: Women Who Love Gay Men	Justine Pimlott	
2006	The End of Second Class	Nancy Nicol	
2007	Red Without Blue	Benita Sills, Todd Sills, Brooke Sebold	
2008	She's a Boy I Knew	Gwen Haworth	
2009	Ferron: Girl on a Road	Gerry Rogers	
2010	The Topp Twins: Untouchable Girls	Leanne Pooley	
2011	We Were Here	David Weissman	
2012	N/A		
2013	Bridegroom	Linda Bloodworth-Thomason	
2014	Matt Shepard Is a Friend of Mine	Michele Josue	
2015	Game Face	Michiel Thomas	
2016	Major!	Annalise Ophelian	
2017	Chavela	Catherine Gund, Daresha Kyi	
2018	Call Her Ganda	PJ Raval	
2019	We Are the Radical Monarchs	Linda Goldstein Knowlton	
2020	Little Girl (La petite fille)	Sébastien Lifshitz	
2021	A Sexplanation	Alexander Liu	
2022	Gateways Grind	Jacquie Lawrence	
2023	Leilani's Fortune	Loveleen Kaur	
2024	A Mother Apart	Laurie Townshend	
2025	Parade: Queer Acts of Love and Resistance	Noam Gonick	
2026	Heals	Pailin Wedel	

=== Audience Award for Best Short Film ===
Year	Film	Director	Ref
1998	Jangri	Safiya Randera	
1998	My Cunt	Deb Strutt, Liz Baulch	
1999	Below the Belt	Laurie Colbert, Dominique Cardona	
1999	Pom	Joanna Ingalls, Mocha Jean Herrup	
2000	Crush	Phillip Bartell	
2001	Interviews with My Next Girlfriend	Cassandra Nicolaou	
2002	Dildo Diaries	Laura Barton, Judy Wilder, Carol Cunningham	
2003	I Am Good Inside	Jo Si Malaya	
2004	Listen	Susan Justin	
2005	Irene Williams: Queen of Lincoln Road	Eric Smith	
2006	Latch Key	Garth Bardsley	
2006	In Search of My Chinese Girlfriend	Lisa Wong	
2007	Hello, My Name Is Herman	Karine Silverwoman	
2008	Pariah	Dee Rees	
2009	Get Happy: A Coming of Age Musical Extravaganza	Mark Payne	
2010	The Armoire	Jamie Travis	
2011	Change	Melissa Osborne, Jeff McCutcheon	
2012	N/A		
2013	Stop Calling Me Honey Bunny	Gabrielle Zilkha	
2014	Living in the Overlap	Cindy Hill, Mary Dalton	
2015	In the Hollow	Austin Lee Bunn	
2016	Oh-Be-Joyful	Susan Jacobson	
2017	Picture This	Jari Osborne	
2018	Pop Rox	Nate Trinrud	
2019	Thrive	Jamie Dispirito	
2020	The Butterfly	Shiho Fukada	
2021	Noor & Layla	Fawzia Mirza	
2022	How Not to Date While Trans	Nyala Moon	
2023	Apayauq	Zeppelin Zeerip	
2024	The History of the Carabiner	Gianna Mazzeo	
2025	Zari	Shruti Parekh	
2026	Tender Chosen	Mason McDonald	

=== Best Canadian Film ===
Year	Film	Director	Ref
1998	The Grace of God	John L'Ecuyer	
1999	Laugh in the Dark	Justine Pimlott	
2000	Johnny Greyeyes	Jorge Manzano	
2001	Hey, Happy!	Noam Gonick	
2001	My Left Breast	Gerry Rogers	
2002	Miss 501: A Portrait of Luck	Clint Alberta	
2003	Saved by the Belles	Ziad Touma	
2004	Sugar	John Palmer	
2005	Everyone	Bill Marchant	
2006	Amnesia: The James Brighton Enigma (Amnésie, l'énigme James Brighton)	Denis Langlois	
2006	533 Statements	Tori Foster	
2007	The Chinese Botanist's Daughters	Dai Sijie	
2008	Be Like Others	Tanaz Eshaghian	
2009	Fig Trees	John Greyson	
2010	Mark	Mike Hoolboom	
2011	Home of the Buffalo	Rémy Huberdeau	
2012	She Said Boom: The Story of Fifth Column	Kevin Hegge	
2013	For Dorian	Rodrigo Barriuso	
2014	Tom at the Farm (Tom à la ferme)	Xavier Dolan	
2015	What We Have (Ce qu'on a)	Maxime Desmons	
2016	Closet Monster	Stephen Dunn	
2017	Rebels on Pointe	Bobbi Jo Hart	
2018	Love, Scott	Laura Marie Wayne	
2019	Drag Kids	Megan Wennberg	
2020	No Ordinary Man	Aisling Chin-Yee, Chase Joynt	
2021	Fanny: The Right to Rock	Bobbi Jo Hart	
2022	Out in the Ring	Ry Levey	
2023	Supporting Our Selves	Lulu Wei	
2024	A Mother Apart	Laurie Townshend	
2025	Really Happy Someday	J Stevens	
2026	Antidiva: The Carole Pope Confessions	Michelle Mama	
2026	Honorable mention: Tracy & Martina: Goin' Out West	Brendan Lyle	

=== Best International Film ===
Year	Film	Director	Ref
2026	Iván & Hadoum	Ian de la Rosa	
2026	Honorable mention: Heals	Pailin Wedel	

=== Best First Feature Film (Bill Sherwood Award) ===
Year	Film	Director	Ref
2009	To Each Her Own	Heather Tobin	
2010	Plan B	Marco Berger	
2011	Black Field	Vardis Marinakis	
2012	N/A		
2013	Animals	Marçal Forés	
2014	52 Tuesdays	Sophie Hyde	
2015	How to Win at Checkers (Every Time)	Josh Kim	
2016	Spa Night	Andrew Ahn	
2017	God's Own Country	Francis Lee	
2018	Retablo	Alvaro Delgado-Aparicio	
2019	A Dog Barking at the Moon	Xiang Zi	
2020	No Hard Feelings (Futur Drei)	Faraz Shariat	
2021	Sweetheart	Marley Morrison	
2022	Homebody	Joseph Sackett	
2023	Almamula	Juan Sebastian Torales	
2024	A Mother Apart	Laurie Townshend	
2025	Rains Over Babel (Llueve sobre Babel)	Gala del Sol	
2026	Black Burns Fast	Sandulela Asanda	
2026	Honorable mention: Out Laws	James Lewis, Lexi Powner	

=== Best Canadian Short Film ===
Year	Film	Director	Ref
1998	Why I Hate Bees	Sarah Abbott	
1999	Swerve	Andrea Dorfman	
2000	Helpless Maiden Makes an I Statement	Thirza Cuthand	
2000	Unmapping Desire	Sheila James	
2000	Quiver	Scott Beveridge	
2001	Rainmakers Zimbabwe	Robbie Hart	
2001	Sea in the Blood	Richard Fung	
2001	Viens Dehors! (Come Out!)	Éric Tessier	
2002	Play, She Said	Lex Vaughn	
2002	The Salivation Army	Scott Treleaven	
2003	This Boy	Amy Burt	
2003	Audition Tape	Benny Nemerofsky Ramsay	
2004	Listen	Susan Justin	
2004	A Moth and a Butterfly	Gilbert Kwong	
2005	Girl on Girl	Miss Nomer Collective	
2006	Jean Genet in Chicago	Frederic Moffat	
2006	Sweater People	Nicole Chung	
2007	The Saddest Boy in the World	Jamie Travis	
2007	Black Men and Me	Michèle Pearson Clarke	
2008	For a Relationship	Jim Verburg	
2009	The Golden Pin	Cuong Ngo	
2010	Rex vs. Singh	Richard Fung, John Greyson, Ali Kazimi	
2011	Dance to Miss Chief	Kent Monkman	
2012	Narcissus	Coral Short	
2013	Stop Calling Me Honey Bunny	Gabrielle Zilkha	
2014	Waack Revolt: A Dance Film	Sonia Hong	
2015	Hole	Martin Edralin	
2016	Never Steady, Never Still	Kathleen Hepburn	
2017	Picture This	Jari Osborne	
2018	The Things You Think I'm Thinking	Sherren Lee	
2019	Soft Spot	Justine Stevens	
2020	Swimmers	Chris Ross	
2021	You Will Still Be Here Tomorrow	Michael Hanley	
2022	Thot or Not	Dylan Glynn	
2023	Adore	Beth Warrian	
2024	Friend of a Friend (Ami d'ami)	Simon Gualtieri	
2025	Hello Stranger	Amélie Hardy	
2026	Brief Somebodies	Andy Reid	
2026	Honorable mention: Same Time Next Year?	Anushay Sheikh	

=== Emerging Canadian Artist ===
Year	Film	Director	Ref
2011	Swim	Jordan Tannahill	
2012	Akin	Chase Joynt	
2013	Happy Birthday Chad!	Jason Sharman	
2014	Tru Love	Kate Johnston, Shauna MacDonald	
2014	100 Crushes, Chapter 6: They	Elisha Lim	
2015	Beat	Tricia Hagoriles	
2016	Pyotr495	Blake Mawson	
2017	Faggot (Tapette)	Olivier Perrier	
2018	For Nonna Anna	Luis De Filippis	
2019	Skies Are Not Just Blue	Lysandre Cosse-Tremblay	
2020	Body So Fluorescent	David Di Giovanni	
2021	Pitoc e icinakosian	Jos-Onimskiw Ottawa-Dubé, Gerry Ottawa	
2022	Save the Date	Bria McLaughlin	
2023	Scaring Women at Night	Karimah Zakia Issa	
2024	I'll Tell You When I'm Ready	Hayley Morin	
2025	Organza's Revenge	Walter Scott	
2026	The D Word	Mya Van Dyk	
2026	Honorable mention: Devils in the Bush	Juliet Belisario	

=== Outstanding Performance ===
Year	Performer	Film	Ref
2024	Lou Goossens	Young Hearts	
2025	Bhushaan Manoj	Cactus Pears	

=== Pitch, Please! ===
Year	Film	Director	Ref
2024	I'm Gonna Kill You	Andrew Chappelle	
2025	Go Piss, Girl!	Pony Nicole Herauf	
2026	Chaat Masala	Anushay Sheikh	

== See also ==
- List of LGBT film festivals
- List of film festivals in Canada
