= Mark Payne (make-up artist) =

American make-up artist, filmmaker, and author

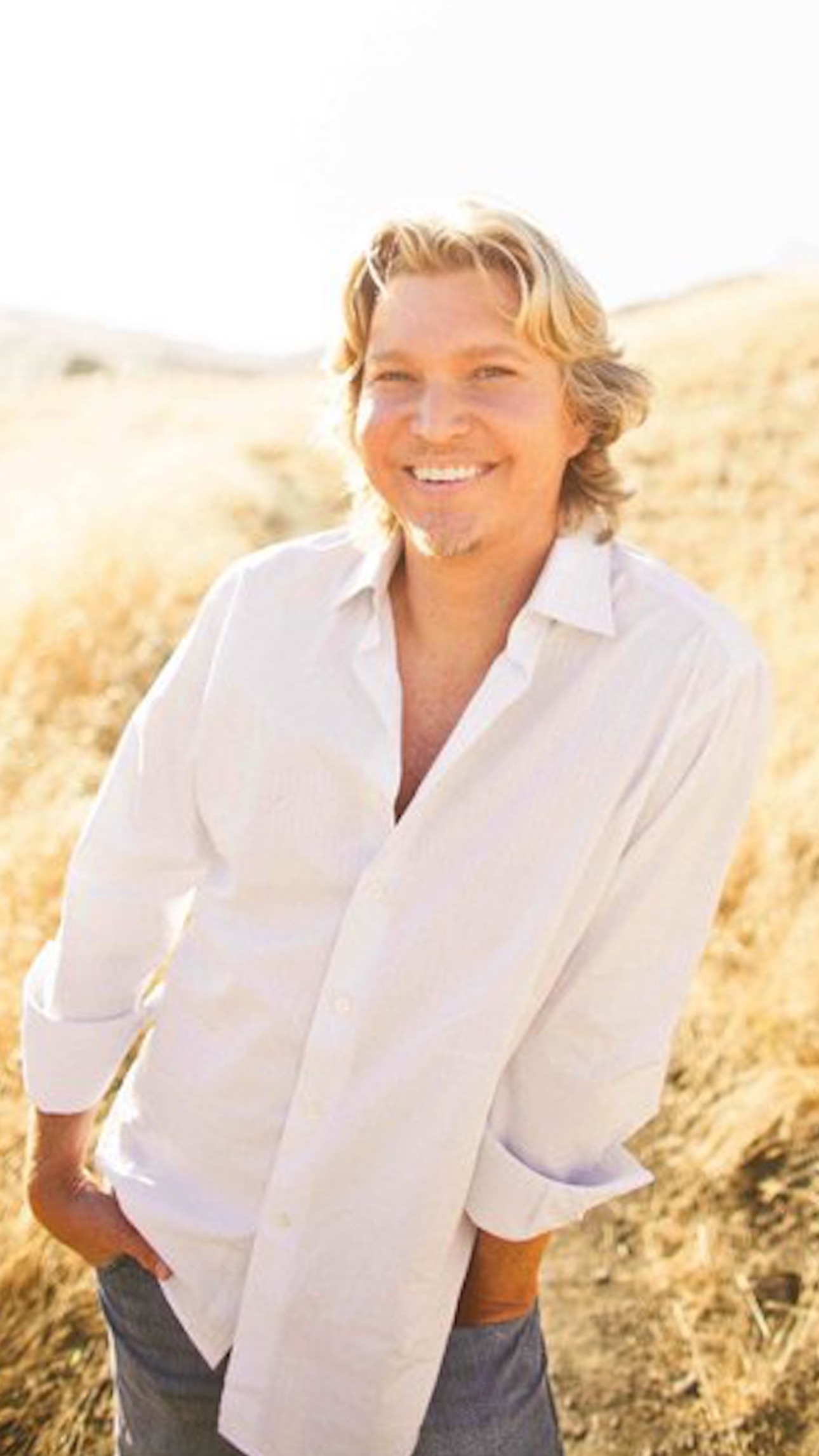
- Born: July 2, 1965 (age 60); Baker City, Oregon, U.S.
- Occupations: Makeup artist, filmmaker, author
- Parent(s): Jack Payne; Jayne Payne

Mark Payne (born July 2, 1965) is an American make-up artist, filmmaker and author. He has won three Emmy Awards.

== Early life ==
Mark Payne started his career as a performer. At the age of twelve, Payne began making home movies of himself performing as his favorite singers. He involved his mother, grandmother and neighbors in the creative process. Acting as his own agent, he used these home movies as demo tapes which led to headlining dates in Europe and Australia. By the age of sixteen, he had performed as the opening act for Bob Hope and Milton Berle. Payne became prominent as the preeminent Liza Minnelli impersonator. In the early 1980s Payne became close friends with the close harmony music group Montgomery, Plant & Stritch, and Billy Stritch remains close. It was Stritch and Montgomery who introduced Payne to Minnelli in the 1990s.

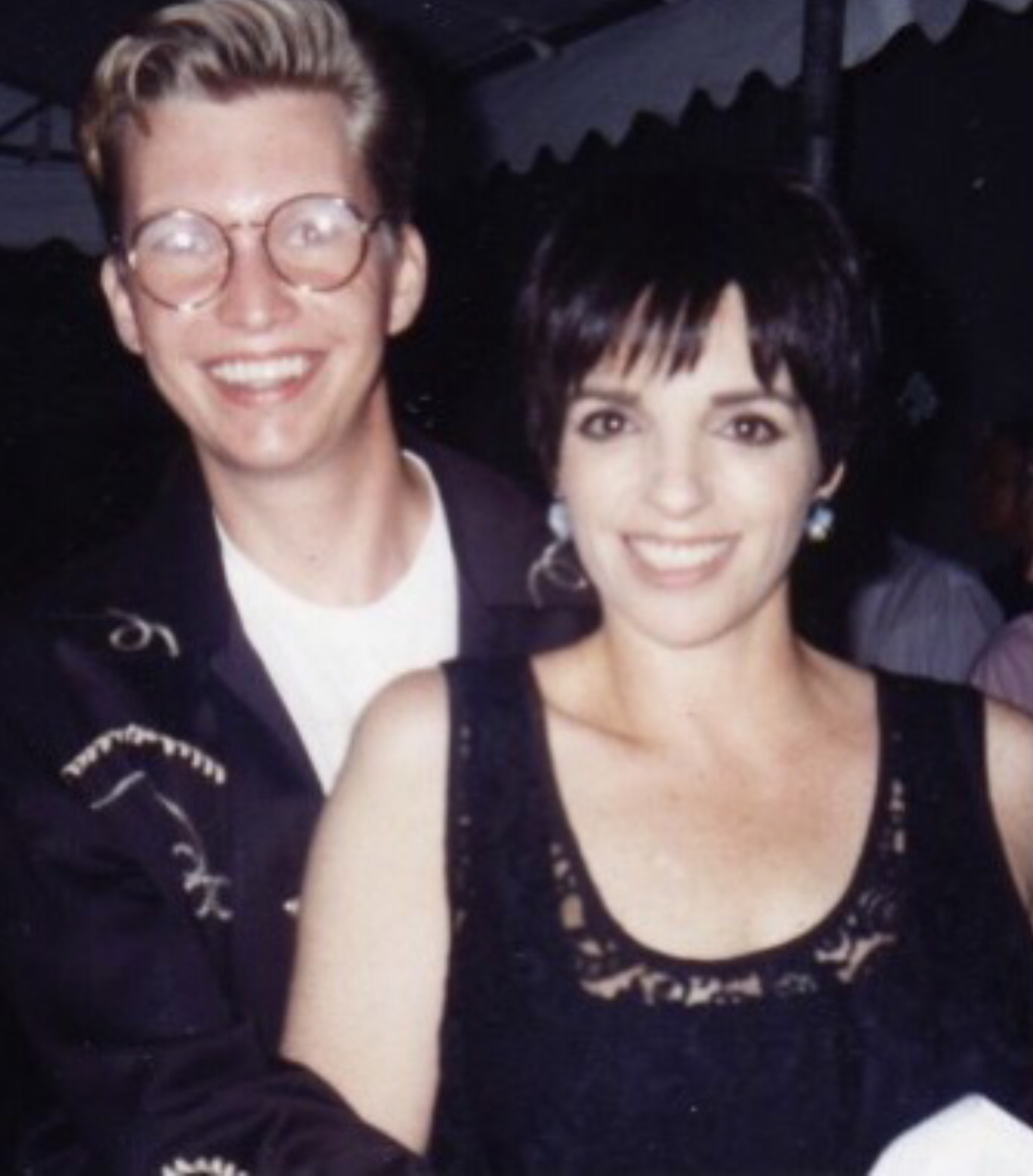
Mark Payne with Liza Minnelli

Mark attended High School for the Performing and Visual Arts in Houston, Texas.

Payne morphed his talent into several incarnations. He was a successful performer, singer and recording artist. He also designed clothing for well-known 1970s designer Suzy Creamcheese and later under his own name. Many celebrities including Madonna, Cher and Dionne Warwick have purchased his clothing. Payne met Sammy Davis Jr. at the Suzy Creamcheese store in Vegas. Payne flew on his first private plane ride as a guest of Davis. When Payne went to NYC in 1984 Creamcheese arranged for him to meet Andy Warhol at The Factory. Warhol in turn introduced Payne to Halston. Mark met Yutaka Hasegawa who was a pattern maker at Halston. Yutaka rented his apartment on 58th St to Mark when he moved to NYC a year later. These people's influences would help shape Payne's career.

== Make-up artist ==
In 1996, while in Texas taking care of his dying grandmother, Payne followed in his mother's footsteps and began working as a make-up artist. In 1997, he met make-up artist Laura Mercier who encouraged him to move to New York. In 1997, Payne collaborated on a HarperCollins book called Double Take: The Art Of The Celebrity MakeOver.

In 1997, Payne transformed Sally Jessy Raphael into Liza Minnelli launching his career in television makeup. He then began working on One Life to Live, gaining him his first Emmy nomination in 2001. In 2002 Payne's career came full circle when Payne was hired to replace Kevyn Aucoin to do Liza Minnelli’s makeup. In 2004, Payne won his first Emmy for his work on Regis & Kelly, winning a second Emmy the following year. In 2008, 2009 and 2011, he was nominated for six Emmy's for his work on the Food Network series Sandra Lee Semi-Homemade, 2012 brought his third Emmy win for that show. Payne has appeared as a makeover expert on television shows including The Rosie O'Donnell Show; The View; Fashion Emergency and Live With Regis & Kelly. Considered "a renowned leader in the field of beauty", he is a regular contributor to Elle; InStyle and Allure fashion magazines. In November 2006, he received The Best Of Beauty award by Allure magazine.

In 2000 it was Payne who suggested to Barry and Fran Weissler to cast Reba McEntire in the revival of Annie Get Your Gun (musical), which gave McEntire her Broadway debut in 2001.

He has worked with numerous celebrities including Beyoncé, Courtney Thorne-Smith, Jane Seymour, Paris Hilton, Sting and Kelly Ripa. Payne notably also worked with Hillary Clinton. Payne has been a guest at the White House during three presidencies. Recently Payne has gained interest from Star Wars fans for his involvement in The Star Wars franchise.

== McCartney divorce ==
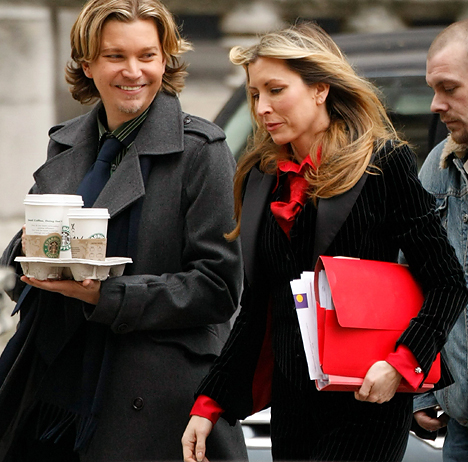

His friendship with Paul McCartney and Heather Mills put him in the middle of the media frenzy surrounding their divorce. Payne was often at Mills side during public appearances and the very public divorce trial in February 2008. At the end of the trial Payne was given the couples infamous purple PT Cruiser, the couple’s Los Angeles car.

In July 2006, while with Mills, Payne was assaulted by Jay Kaycappa in Brighton, England. Kaycappa was a notorious paparazzo trying to photograph Mills for the tabloids. There was a much publicized trial the following summer. Kaycappa, who had 132 previous criminal convictions, was found guilty and sentenced to a 140-hour community order and ordered to pay Payne £50., Mills £100. and £1,000. court costs.

== Currently ==
Heather Mills first made Payne aware of the importance of "Green" products and the Vegan lifestyle. He has become very conscious of the environment and believes "you are what you consume."

While working on a tribute video about Payne, a friend asked Payne for his assistance in compiling film footage from his childhood performances. Because of Payne's intimate knowledge of the hundreds of hours of footage, it was a natural decision for him to direct. In 2008, he directed his first film Get Happy (2008 Film) which has won fourteen awards.

Payne is an avid collector of art and fashion. A large portion of Payne's Halston collection went on display at Brooklyn Museum in 2020 and will tour to AGO museum in Toronto and Dortmunder U, Germany in 2021 as part of the Studio 54 Night Magic Exhibit also featured in WWD magazine.

Payne has a popular BNB compound on 5 acres near Joshua Tree, California called Joshua View.

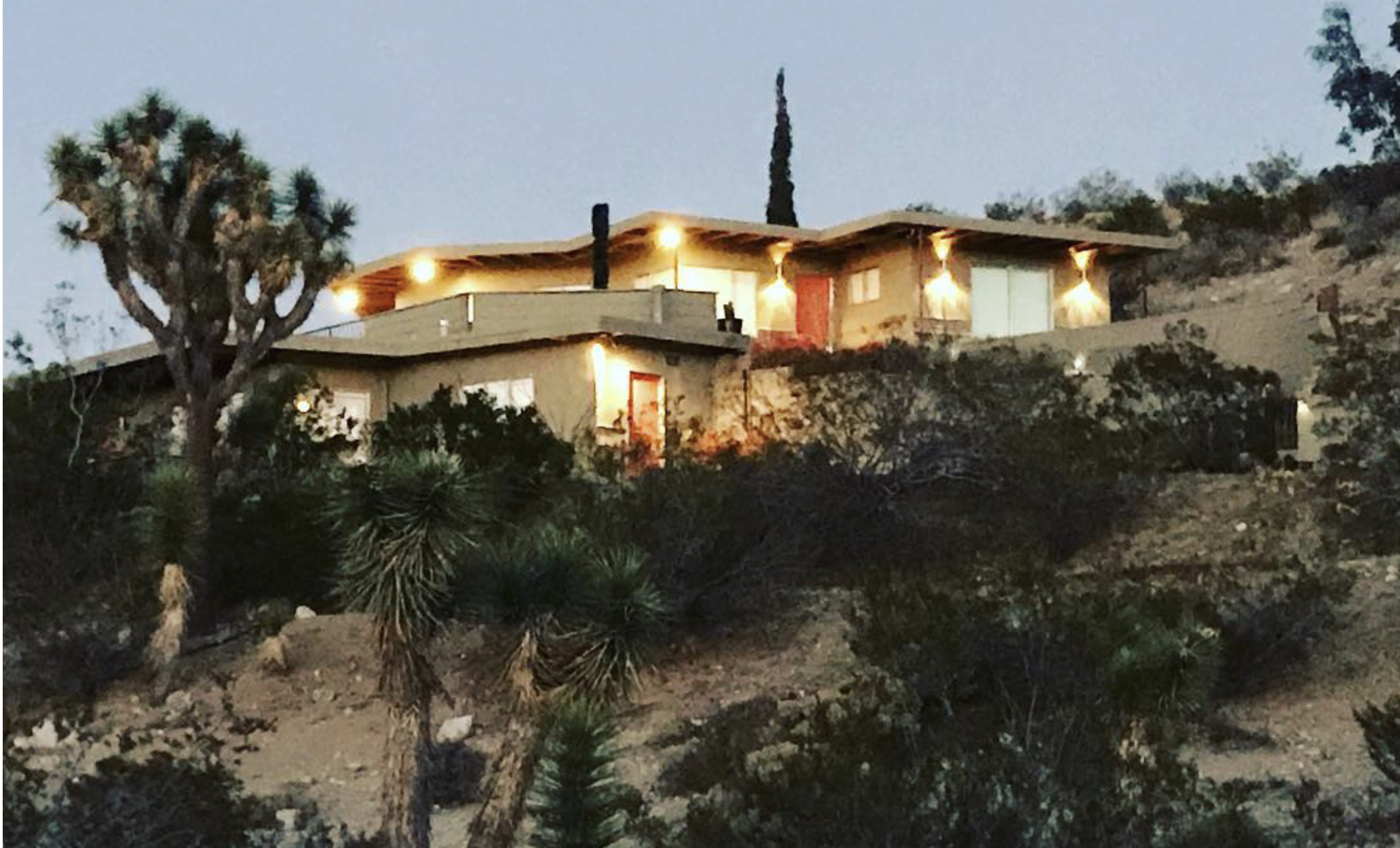
Joshua View BNB near Joshua Tree

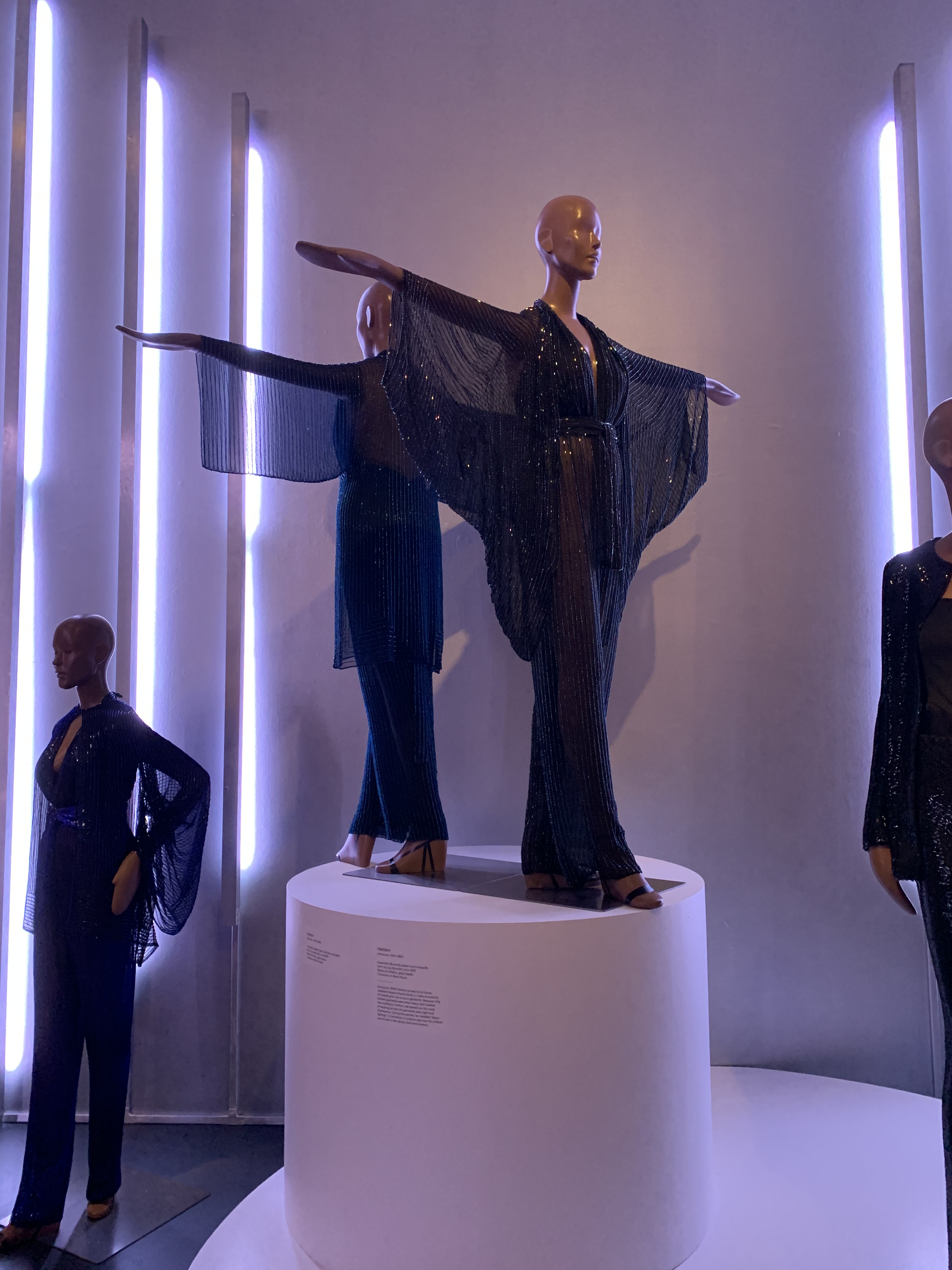
Liza Minnelli Halston's from the Mark Payne collection at Brooklyn Museum 2020

== Sources ==
- Double Take: The Art of the Celebrity Makeover - HarperCollins ISBN 0-06-098806-1
- Elle May 2008 issue page 210, 212
- InStyle April 2007 issue page 453
- Allure November 2006 page 165
