= 26th GLAAD Media Awards =

Annual US media awards ceremony

The 26th GLAAD Media Awards was the 2015 annual presentation of the GLAAD Media Awards, presented by GLAAD honoring the 2014 season. The awards honored films, television shows, musicians and works of journalism that fairly and accurately represent the LGBT community and issues relevant to the community. GLAAD announced 144 nominees in 31 English and Spanish language categories for the awards. It was the first presentation to allow for up to 10 nominees per category, expanding from the prior shortlisting of up to 5 nominees. It was presented at ceremonies in Los Angeles on March 21 and New York on May 9.

The nominees were announced on January 21, 2015.

== Winners and nominees ==
The winners are indicated in bold.

=== English-language categories ===
Award	Nominees
Outstanding Film - Wide Release	**The Imitation Game**; Love is Strange; Pride; The Skeleton Twins; Tammy
Outstanding Film - Limited Release	**Lilting**; Dear White People; Life Partners; The Way He Looks; Will You Still Love Me Tomorrow
Outstanding Drama Series	**How to Get Away with Murder**; Degrassi: The Next Generation; The Fosters; Game of Thrones; Grey's Anatomy; Last Tango in Halifax; Masters of Sex; Orphan Black; Pretty Little Liars; Shameless
Outstanding Comedy Series	**Transparent**; Brooklyn Nine-Nine; Faking It; Glee; Looking; Modern Family; Orange Is The New Black; Please Like Me; Sirens; Vicious
Outstanding Individual Episode (in a series without a regular LGBT character)	**"Identity Crisis" of Drop Dead Diva**; "Deep Breath" of Doctor Who; "Down a Tree" of Good Luck Charlie; "Let's Have a Baby" of Playing House; "No Lack of Void" of Elementary
Outstanding TV Movie or Mini-Series	**The Normal Heart**
Outstanding Documentary	**L Word Mississippi: Hate the Sin**; The Case Against 8; Laverne Cox Presents: The T Word; To Russia with Love; True Trans with Laura Jane Grace
Outstanding Reality Program	**R&B Divas: Atlanta**; B.O.R.N. to Style; Big Freedia: Queen of Bounce; Make or Break: The Linda Perry Project; Survivor: San Juan del Sur
Outstanding Daily Drama	**Days of Our Lives**; General Hospital
Outstanding Talk Show Episode	**"Pepe Julian Onziema" of Last Week Tonight with John Oliver**; "Issues Facing the Transgender Community" of Katie; "Laverne Cox discusses 'The T Word'" of The View; "Michael Sam" of Oprah Prime; "Robin Roberts" of The Ellen Degeneres Show
Outstanding Music Artist	**Against Me!, Transgender Dysphoria Blues**; Angel Haze, Dirty Gold; Mary Gauthier, Trouble & Love; Mary Lambert, Heart on My Sleeve; Sam Smith, In the Lonely Hour
Outstanding Comic Book	**Rat Queens, by Kurtis J. Wiebe, Roc Upchurch, Image Comics**; Hawkeye, by Matt Fraction, Annie Wu, Chris Eliopoulos, David Aja, Marvel Comics; Lumberjanes, by ND Stevenson, Grace Ellis, Gus Allen, Boom! Studios; Memetic, by James Tynion IV, Eryk Donovan, Boom! Studios; Saga, by Brian K. Vaughan, Fiona Staples, Image Comics
Outstanding TV Journalism - News Magazine	**"Coming Out" of Nick News with Linda Ellerbee**; "Gay and Muslim in America" of America Tonight; "Gay Rodeo" of This is Life with Lisa Ling; "Infield & Out: Baseball for All" of Morning Joe; "Transgender Society" [series] of Ronan Farrow Daily
Outstanding TV Journalism Segment	**"Fired for Being Gay?" of MSNBC Live**; "Change is Coming to the South"' of Melissa Harris-Perry; "License to Discriminate?" of Anderson Cooper 360°; "A Model with a Mission" of Alicia Menendez Tonight; "Transgender Tipping Point?" of This Week
Outstanding Newspaper Article	**"Longtime Utah LGBT Advocates Recount Brutal History" by Erin Alberty, Salt Lake City Tribune**; "A Christian Family, a Gay Son and a Wichita Father’s Change of Heart" by Roy Wenzl, The Wichita Eagle; "For Transgender Service Members, Honesty Can End Career" by Ernesto Londoño, The Washington Post; "An Identity to Call Their Own" [series] by Michael A. Fuoco and Mackenzie Carpenter, Pittsburgh Post-Gazette; "When They Stopped Waiting" by Shaun McKinnon, The Arizona Republic
Outstanding Magazine Article	**"The Transgender Tipping Point" by Katy Steinmetz, Time**; "Do Ask, Do Tell" by S.L. Price, Sports Illustrated; "Inside the Iron Closet: What It's Like to Be Gay in Putin's Russia" by Jeff Sharlet, GQ; "Sex Without Fear" by Tim Murphy, New York; "The Forsaken" by Alex Morris, Rolling Stone
Outstanding Magazine Overall Coverage	**Sports Illustrated**; Essence; Glamour; Out; Time
Outstanding Digital Journalism Article	**"31 Days of PrEP" [series], Advocate.com**; "Black Parents, Gay Sons and Redefining Masculinity" by Edward Wyckoff Williams, TheRoot.com; "Conner Mertens came out to his college football team. Now he comes out publicly." by Cyd Zeigler, Outsports.com; "A Nun's Secret Ministry Brings Hope to the Transgender Community" by Nathan Schneider, America.Aljazeera.com; "A Year Later, 'Nothing' Has Changed Since Transgender Woman Islan Nettles was Killed" by Tony Merevick, Buzzfeed.com
Outstanding Digital Journalism - Multimedia	**"Why did the U.S. Lock Up These Women with Men?" by Cristina Costantini, Jorge Rivas, Kristofer Ríos, Fusion.net**; "Left Behind: LGBT Homeless Youth Struggle to Survive on the Streets" by Miranda Leitsinger, NBCNews.com; "With Technology I Didn’t Have to Sell My Body" by Kerri Pang, MSNBC.com; "Young and Gay: Jamaica's Gully Queens" by Adri Murguia, Christo Geoghegan, News.Vice.com; "Young and Gay in Putin's Russia" by Milene Larsson, News.Vice.com
Outstanding Blog	**Autostraddle**; The Art of Transliness; Box Turtle Bulletin; Holy Bullies and Headless Monsters; My Fabulous Disease

=== Special awards ===
Award	Winner	Ref.
Vito Russo Award	**Thomas Roberts**	
Excellence in Media Award	**Kelly Ripa**	
Special Recognition Awards	**Dragon Age: Inquisition**	
Special Recognition Awards	**"Era Diferente" by Los Tigres del Norte**	
