= Get Happy: A Coming of Age Musical Extravaganza =

Get Happy
- Directed by: Mark Payne
- Starring: Mark Payne; Kendall Barr; Heather Mills; Markie Costello; Larry Edwards; Lisa Sheppard; Dejon Mayes; Jayne Payne; Kimberly Delape; Sharon Montgomery; Elysa Shapirro
- Release date: 2008
- Running time: 25 minutes
- Country: United States
- Language: English

Get Happy is a 2008 documentary film by Mark Payne.

== About ==
Get Happy is a coming of age musical extravaganza about a child raised by his mother and grandmother who allowed him to express himself in a most unconventional way. This documentary includes actual footage from old Super 8 footage and VHS videotape of Mark Payne as a childhood performer. The film documents how by age 13 Mark was working with many entertainers including Bob Hope and Milton Berle and that early in his life, Mark designed clothes worn by Madonna and Cher as well as establishing a successful singing career. The film also shows how he has evolved into one of the most sought after makeup artists in Hollywood.

== History ==
While working on a tribute video about Payne for his 40th birthday, a friend asked Payne for his assistance in compiling film footage from his childhood performances. Because of Payne's intimate knowledge of the hundreds of hours of footage, it was a natural decision for him to direct. Encouraged by several industry people in LA it became the short film it is today. It has won 14 awards to date and screened at more than 50 film festivals around the world.

== Won ==
- Chicago Reeling Film Festival: Best Short Film Jury Award (2009)
- Chicago Reeling Film Festival: Best Short Film Audience Award (2009)
- Outfest: Best Short Film Audience Award (2009)
- Toronto Inside Out LGBT Film Festival: Best Short Film Audience Award (2009)
- Toronto Inside Out LGBT Film Festival: Best Short Film Jury Award (2009)
- Austin LGBT Film Festival: Best Short Film Audience Award (2009)
- Austin LGBT Film Festival: Best Documentary Short Film Award (2009)
- Reel Pride: Directors Club Filmmaker Award (2009)
- Southwest Gay and Lesbian Film Festival: Best Short Film (2009)
- WorldFest-Houston International Film Festival: Remi Award (2009)
- Vermont Bear Film Festival: Paw Award Best Short (2010)
- Cleveland International Film Festival: Programmers Award (2010)
- Cleveland International Film Festival: Best LGBT Short Film (2010)

== Nominated ==
- Iris Prize: (2009)
