= Clint Alberta =

Canadian filmmaker (1970–2002)

- Born: Clinton David Morrill; January 16, 1970; Edmonton, Alberta
- Died: February 25, 2002 (aged 32); Toronto, Ontario
- Education: University of Alberta
- Occupation: Filmmaker
- Years active: 1999–2002

Clint Alberta (January 16, 1970 – February 25, 2002), also known as Clint Morrill, Clint Tourangeau, Clint Star, and Jules Karatechamp, was a Canadian filmmaker.

== Life ==
He was born as Clint Morrill to a Métis father and a Euro-Canadian mother, Betty Morill. He lost his left index finger at the age of three in an accident with an axe.

He studied psychology at the University of Alberta, where he counseled native children and solidified his own identity as a native person. He became involved in the National Film Board of Canada's Studio One native program in Edmonton, where he made his first film, Lost Songs.

He based his best-known film, Deep Inside Clint Star, on a series of interviews he did with several friends from the Métis community. According to Katharine Asals, who edited the film, Alberta's influences for the film were "Freud and Matisse and pornography". he describes Deep Inside as "a look at native sexuality through identity, or identity through intimacy, or intimacy through perception of beauty and self." Alberta, who portrays an obnoxious pornographic performer in the film, undertook an extended battle with the National Film Board when they told him to cut a long silence from Deep Inside. The film received high praise at the Sundance Film Festival in 2000, and won the Donald Brittain Award at the 15th Gemini Awards. While producer Silva Basmajian was accepting the award, Alberta began to perform a traditional First Nations dance behind him, but was ushered off stage by security because they did not realize he was the filmmaker.

Alberta experienced a particular degree of poverty after releasing the film, living on the streets for several months after that.

On February 25, 2002, Alberta died by suicide, approximately one month after the premiere of his final film Miss 501: A Portrait of Luck.

== Filmography ==
- Lost Songs, 1999
- My Cousin Albert: Portrait in Shades of Black, 1999
- Deep Inside Clint Star, 1999
- Miss 501: A Portrait of Luck, 2002
