= Denis Langlois (director) =

Denis Langlois (born in Longueuil, Quebec) is a Canadian director, screenwriter, producer, actor and editor from Quebec. He is most noted for his feature films Danny in the Sky, Amnesia: The James Brighton Enigma (Amnésie, l'énigme James Brighton) and A Paradise Too Far (Y’est où le paradis?).

== Biography ==
Denis Langlois received a diploma from the Concordia University film program. In 1994, with Bertrand Lachance, he founded a company called Castor & Pollux Productions.

=== As director ===
- 1992 : My Life (Ma vie)
- 1996 : The Escort (L'escorte)
- 2001 : Danny in the Sky
- 2005 : Amnesia: The James Brighton Enigma (Amnésie, l'énigme James Brighton)
- 2017 : A Paradise Too Far (Y’est où le paradis?)

=== As scriptwriter ===
- 1992 : My life
- 1996 : The Escort
- 2001 : Danny in the Sky
- 2005 : Amnesia - The James Brighton Enigma
- 2006 : Missing Victor Pellerin (Rechercher Victor Pellerin)
- 2017 : A Paradise Too Far

=== As producer ===
- 1992 : My life
- 1996 : The Escort
- 2001 : Danny in the Sky
- 2005 : Amnesia - The James Brighton Enigma

=== As actor ===
- 1993 : My life : Jeannot
- 1996 : The Escort : Amant de Marco

=== As editor ===
- 1996 : The Escort
- 2005 : Amnesia - The James Brighton Enigma

== Awards and nominations ==
=== Awards ===
Amnesia: The James Brighton Enigma was co-winner, with Tori Foster's documentary film 533 Statements, of the best Canadian feature film prize at the Inside Out Film and Video Festival in Toronto in 2006. It also got the best feature film public's prize in the Cine Llamale H of Montevideo in Uruguay in 2008. "A Paradise Too Far" won best feature film at Picture This... Film Festival in Calgary in 2018. It is also a semi-finalist for the Inclusivity Prize at Wayward Festival in Los Angeles 2018.

=== Nominations ===
- 2001: Danny in the Sky was nominated in the category of "best music" for the Quebec cinema's Jutra price in 2005.
- 2017: A Paradise Too Far was nominated for the Zeno Mountain Award at the Miami Film Festival in 2017.
