= Cuong Ngo =

Vietnamese film director

- Born: Ngô Quốc Cường; 1978 (age 46–47); Saigon, Vietnam
- Occupation: Film director

Ngô Quốc Cường is a Vietnamese film director who earned a BFA-Honours in Performing Arts for Theatre & Film in his native country (2002) before pursuing his second degree in Film Production at York University in Toronto, BFA-Honours, with specializations in Directing, Screenwriting & Editing (2009). Ngo has received numerous awards and nominations at international film festivals including the Shanghai International Film Festival's New Asian Talent award on June 20, 2012. Ngo also received the Next Generation Award for Vietnamese Innovation Visionary Award in Toronto, 2012. Ngo has directed several short films, television commercials, documentaries, music videos and feature films including The Hitchhiker Project (2008) and The Golden Pin (2009), which won Best Canadian Short at the Toronto Inside Out Film & Video Festival before touring at over 50 international film festivals.

Pearls of the Far East was Ngo's feature film debut as director, producer, and co-editor. Pearls Of The Far East won many awards and enjoyed a decent run on the international film festivals circuit before its theatrical release in Vietnam in March 2012. Ngo currently shares his time between the United States, Canada, and Vietnam.

== Filmography ==
- The Golden Pin (2009)
- The Hitchhiker Project (2009)
- The Cello Tutor (2009)
- Pearls of the Far East (2011)
