= Interligne (organization) =

- Centre Interligne Inc.
- Formation: 1980
- Founded at: Montreal, QC
- Type: Registered Charity
- Website: Interligne.co

Interligne is a LGBTQ+ organization that provides a help service, shares information about, and raises awareness of LGBTQ+ people and their issues.

== Mission and values ==
Interligne serves as a center providing assistance and information about LGBTQ+ people. Its 24-hour service provides support to LGBTQ+ people, their loved ones and community, school, health and social service staff. Interligne also conducts outreach activities, to promote a greater societal acceptance towards LGBTQ+ people.

== Services ==
Interligne services include:

- Help, information and references by phone and text messaging (24/7);
- Help, information and references by online chat;
- Help, information and references by e-mail;
- A FAQ about LGBTQ+ experiences (FAQ);
- Youth programs;
- Violence programs;
- Awareness campaigns

== History ==
Gay Line was founded in 1976 by activists who wanted to provide a helpline with information and advice to gay and lesbian people in Montreal. It was part of what was called the "Gay Social Services Project" of the Ville Marie Social Services Centre and was staffed by volunteers and professional social workers, who offered counseling services. In the late 1990s, Gay Line widened its scope to include bisexual and transgender people. It operated until 2012.

In the early 1980s, a similar version of the helpline was formed in Quebec called Gai Écoute. Since 2017, Gai Écoute has become Centre Interligne Inc.

"Since our inception in 1980, we have been listening and supporting people of all sexual orientations and gender identities. In recent years, we have felt that the name Gai Écoute was out of step with our reality. We then began a long process of studying our own brand identity and how best to convey this openness," explains Pascal Vaillancourt, executive director of Interligne. "Above all, the goal is to reach everyone so that no one is isolated," says Robert Asselin, president of Interligne.

Interligne provides its services for both French-speaking and English-speaking members of the LGBTQ+ communities across Canada. In 2019-2020, Interligne has received over 36 000 help requests from members of the LGBTQ+ communities across the world.
