= New York Lesbian, Gay, Bisexual, & Transgender Film Festival =

Annual LGBTQ film festival in New York City, U.S.

NewFest: New York LGBT Film Festival
- Status: Active
- Genre: Film festival
- Begins: October 15, 2026
- Ends: October 25, 2026
- Frequency: Annually
- Venue: Various locations, including, BAM Rose Cinemas, LGBT Community Center, Nitehawk Prospect Park, SVA Theatre
- Location: New York City, New York
- Country: U.S.
- Founded: 1988 (38 years ago)
- Leader: David Hatkoff, Executive Director (since 2019)
- Sponsor: The New Festival, Inc.
- Website: newfest.org

NewFest: The New York Lesbian, Gay, Bisexual, & Transgender Film Festival, put on by NewFest (legal name The New Festival, Inc.), is the largest LGBTQ film festival in the United States and one of the most comprehensive forums of national and international LGBT film/video in the world.

== History and operations ==
David Hatkoff has been the executive director of NewFest since 2019.

Founded in 1988, The New Festival, Inc is a non-profit media arts organization dedicated to showcasing the newest and best LGBT media for the greater New York metropolitan area.

NewFest strives to encourage and foster environments for LGBTQ and allied filmmakers and viewers to represent the diversity and complexity of voices in the LGBTQ community, and to amplify those voices across the nation.

=== List of events ===
The largest and most popular program from NewFest is the twelve-day New York LGBT Film Festival. Additionally, year-round events include: the five-day Queering the Canon, the five-day NewFest Pride, and many advance screenings with various studios and streamers.

NewFest also has three artist development programs: The New Voices Filmmaker Grant, supported by Netflix; Sound & Scene, in partnership with Concord Originals; and the Black Filmmakers Initiative.

NewFest works with the NYC Department of Education on programs for high school students.

NewFest has partnered with the LGBT Center in NYC to screen films on a monthly basis at the center, screenings to include discussions with the filmmakers.

In 2020, the festival was one of the key partners, alongside Outfest Los Angeles, the Frameline Film Festival and the Inside Out Film and Video Festival, in the North American Queer Festival Alliance, an initiative to further publicize and promote LGBT film.

=== Grand Jury Award winners ===
Sources:

- 1997: Chocolate Babies and You Don't Know Dick: Courageous Hearts of Transsexual Men
- 2000: Water Drops on Burning Rocks and Our House: A Very Real Documentary About Kids of Gay & Lesbian Parents
- 2001: O Fantasma and Bombay Eunuch
- 2002: The Ignorant Fairies and Out in the Cold
- 2003: Between Two Women, I Exist, and The Gift
- 2004: You I Love and Garden
- 2005: A Year Without Love and Little Man
- 2006: The Gymnast, Go West, and Camp Out
- 2007: Times Have Been Better and Saving Marriage
- 2008: The Lost Coast, The Amazing Truth About Queen Raquela, and Be Like Others
- 2009: Light Gradient and Prodigal Sons
- 2010: The Topp Twins: Untouchable Girls
- 2011: Circumstance and Gone
- 2017: The Feels, The City of the Future, and Alabama Bound
- 2018: Jules of Light and Dark, Retablo, and Sidney & Friends
- 2019: Tremors and Queen of Lapa
- 2020: Cowboys, Welcome to the USA, and Keyboard Fantasies: The Beverly Glenn-Copeland Story
- 2021: A Distant Place, Passing, Miguel's War, and Fervor
- 2022: The Blue Caftan, Swallowed, UÝRA — The Rising Forest, and How Not to Date While Trans
- 2023: Fancy Dance, Housekeeping for Beginners, Acsexybility, and Dilating for Maximum Results
- 2024: Ponyboi, Baby, Reas, and Zari
- 2025: Fucktoys, Love Letters, Come See Me in the Good Light, and Rainbow Girls

=== Audience Award winners ===
Sources:

- 2001: The Iron Ladies
- 2002: Ruthie and Connie: Every Room in the House
- 2003: Brother Outsider: The Life of Bayard Rustin
- 2004: Girl Play
- 2005: Left Lane: On the Road with Folk Poet Alix Olson
- 2006: Cruel and Unusual
- 2007: Out at the Wedding
- 2008: Pageant
- 2009: Mississippi Damned and Florent: Queen of the Meat Market
- 2010: Children of God
- 2011: The Wise Kids, Turtle Hill, Brooklyn, and One Night Stand
- 2012: My Best Day and Love Free or Die
- 2013: Free Fall, Out in the Dark and Valentine Road
- 2014: The Way He Looks
- 2015: Those People and The Same Difference
- 2016: Suicide Kale and Political Animals
- 2017: A Date for Mad Mary and Hot to Trot
- 2018: Rafiki and Man Made
- 2019: And Then We Danced and A Night at Switch n' Play
- 2020: Dating Amber and Cured
- 2021: Sheer Qorma, All Boys Aren't Blue, The Beauty President, and Invisible
- 2022: Monsieur Le Butch, and Cans Can't Stand
- 2023: Fancy Dance, Coming Around, The End, and There Are Things To Do
- 2024: Duino, This is Ballroom, Zari, and Alok
- 2025: In Transit, Come See Me in the Good Light, Rainbow Girls", and "Hustleween

== See also ==
- List of film festivals in New York
- List of LGBTQ film festivals
- Cinema of the United States
- LGBT culture in New York City
