= 16th Ensor Awards =

Gala of the Ensors
- Date: 7 February 2026

Highlights
- Best Picture: Julian
- Most nominations: Putain and How To Kill Your Sister

The 16th Ensor Awards, presented by the Ensor Academy, took place on 7 February 2026 at the end of the Ostend Film Festival during the Gala of the Ensors to honor Flemish films and TV of 2025. The TV series Putain won 8 awards and the film Julian won 4 awards, including best picture.

== Winners and nominees ==
=== Film Awards ===
Winners are listed first, highlighted in boldface, and indicated with a double dagger (‡).

**Best Film**: **Julian**‡; BXL; Soft Leaves; Têtes brûlées; Young Hearts	**Best Direction**: **Cato Kusters - Julian**‡; Adil El Arbi, Bilall Fallah - Patsers; Miwako Van Weyenberg - Soft Leaves; Anthony Schatteman - Young Hearts; Maja-Ajmia Zellama - Têtes brûlées
**Best Performance in a Lead Role**: **Laurence Roothooft - Julian**‡; Lou Goossens - Young Hearts; Fouad Hajji - BXL; Frank Lammers - Ferry 2; Nina Meurisse - Julian	**Best Performance in a Supporting Role**: **Emilie De Roo - Young Hearts**‡; Veerle Baetens - Comeback; Jennifer Heylen - Julian; Peter Seynaeve - Julian; Geert Van Rampelberg - Young Hearts
**Best Screenplay**: **Angelo Tijssens, Cato Kusters - Julian**‡; Ish Ait Hamou, Monir Ait Hamou - BXL; Anthony Schatteman - Young Hearts; Miwako Van Weyenberg - Soft Leaves; Maja-Ajmia Zellama - Têtes brûlées	**Best Editing**: **Stijn Deconinck, Joppe Van Den Brande - Putain**‡; Mathieu Depuydt, Gert Fimmers - This is Not a Murder Mystery; Bert Jacobs - How To Kill Your Sister; Maarten Janssens, Ward Geerts - Comeback; Pieter Smet - Patsers
**Best Director of Photography (DOP)**: **Jordan Vanschel - Putain**‡; Esmoreit Lutters - Roomies 2; Esmoreit Lutters - How To Kill Your Sister; Kobe Vangronsveld - Oh, Otto!; David Williamson - This Is Not a Murder Mystery	**Best Makeup**: **Labhise Allara Mandango Ciratu - Putain**‡; Esther De Goey - Dood Spoor; Leonie Gysel - De big fuck-up; Dorien Van Poucke, Kitty Van Meel - How To Kill Your Sister; Kaatje Van Damme - This Is Not a Murder Mystery
**Best Costume Design**: **Charlotte Willems - This Is Not a Murder Mystery**‡; Maud Kuypers - De big fuck-up; Isabel Van Renterghem - Putain; Manu Verschueren - Ferry 2; Charlotte Willems - How To Kill Your Sister	**Best Art Direction**: **Bart Van Loo - This Is Not a Murder Mystery**‡; Toon Mariën - De big fuck-up; Jonathan Van Essche - Putain; Bart Van Loo - Dood Spoor; Jimmy Van Meel, Jan Roos - How To Kill Your Sister
**Best Sound**: **Matthias Hillegeer, Gedeon Depauw - How To Kill Your Sister**‡; Miguel De Oliveira e Silva, Bram Deryckere - This Is Not a Murder Mystery; Neal Willaert - De big fuck-up; Arne Winderickx, Arnout Colaert - Putain; Arne Winderickx, Arnout Colaert, Matthias Hillegeer, Alek Goosse - Julian	**Best Music**: **Hannes De Maeyer, Justine Bourgeus - This is Not a Murder Mystery**‡; Meskerem Mees, Pieter Van Dessel, Cedric Engels, Mounir Hathout - How To Kill Your Sister; Zwangere Guy, Chuki Beats, Gala Dragot, FORSISSIES, Nah, Peet, Bredren & Amaea Rea, Faberyayo, Hash Converters, Madou, OCB, Krisy, Sam Gélis & Eva Rose, BRUTUS, Bert Cools, Boule Mpanya, Stab Beatmaker, 2 Times Nothing, Driss Bennis, Chris Uptown, Liesa Van der Aa, Chris Ferreira, Pablo's Eye, De Nooit Moede, Paulo Rietjens - Putain; Mick Lemaire, Eefje de Visser, Bobbi Lu, CLELIA, Maria Iskariot, Porcelain id, Judith Kiddo, Dushime, Ategha, Mickael Karkousse, Juicy, Hermanos Inglesos, Mounir Hathout - Roomies 2; Ruben De Gheselle - Young Hearts
**Best Documentary Film**: **Schaap**‡; Fantastique; Grand me; Slave Island; Une Femme Qui Part	**Best Short Film**: **Shutterspeed - Jasper De Maeseneer**‡; De dag dat het zonlicht niet meer scheen - Maria Stuut, Frederik Stuut; De leider komt - Michiel Geluykens, Manuel Janssens; Het wonder daaronder - Nina Landau; Klein verhaal - Mirjam Plettinx
**Best Youth Fiction**: **Young Hearts**‡; #LikeMe (S5); Diede-Skate; Têtes Brûlées; United	**Best Animation**: **Flavors Of Iraq**‡; De ijsbeerprins; De omgekeerde rivier; Een nieuwe vriend voor Dikkie Dik; Onze zomer van vrijheid
**The Box Office Prize**: **Patsers‡**	**Promise of the Year - supported by BNP Paribas Fortis**: **Cato Kusters**‡
**Best French-language Belgian film**: **Jeunes Mères - Jean-Pierre Dardenne, Luc Dardenne‡**	**Best Co-production**: **Köln 75‡**

=== TV Awards ===
**Best Fiction – Series**: **Putain**‡; De big fuck-up; Dood Spoor; How To Kill Your Sister; Oh, Otto!	**Best Direction TV-Series**: **Deben Van Dam - Putain**‡; Jonas Geirnaert - How To Kill Your Sister; Hans Herbots - This is Not a Murder Mystery; Stijn Van Kerkhoven - Oh, Otto!; Flo Van Deuren, Kato De Boeck - Roomies 2
**Best Actor in a Leading Role (Fiction Series)**: **Liesa Van der Aa - Putain**‡; Marjan De Schutter - How To Kill Your Sister; Willem De Schryver - De big fuck-up; Liam Jacqmin - Putain; Mona Mina Leon - Holy Sh!t	**Best Supporting Actor (Fiction Series)**: **Felix Heremans - Putain**‡; Sofie Decleir - How To Kill Your Sister; Marjan De Schutter - Roomies 2; Jennifer Heylen - Oh, Otto!; Nico Sturm - How To Kill Your Sister
**Best Screenplay (Fiction Series)**: **Deben Van Dam, Frederik Daem, Nadège Bibo-Tansia - Putain‡**; Evelien Broekaert, Pedro Elias - How To Kill Your Sister; Malin-Sarah Gozin - Dood Spoor; Ditte Jacoby, Emiel Van Wouwe - Oh, Otto!; Flo Van Deuren, Kato De Boeck - Roomies 2	**Best Documentary Series**: **Basisschool Balder**‡; 82 Dagen in de hel; Mobutu's Game; The deal with Iran; Voorbij de schaamte
