= Grant Scicluna =

Australian film director and writer (born 1980)

- Born: 17 September 1980 (age 46); Windsor, New South Wales
- Occupation: film director
- Years active: 2006–present
- Spouse: David Allouf (m. 2022)

Grant Scicluna (born in 1980) is an Australian film director and writer. best known for his work on The Wilding which won the Iris Prize in 2012, and the feature film Downriver. He is a graduate of RMIT University School of Media and Communications in Melbourne.

Scicluna directed the Iris Prize short film Hurt's Rescue which premiered at the Melbourne International Film Festival in 2014.

In 2015, Scicluna made his feature debut with the Screen Australia backed Downriver which premiered at the Melbourne International Film Festival before playing at Toronto International Film Festival, with an Australian cinema release following. Downriver sold to the USA, the UK and Europe.

Scicluna lives in Melbourne, Australia and is married to designer, David Allouf. He frequently works with producer Jannine Barnes.

== Filmography (as director) ==
Year	Film	Production company	Awards	Result
2006	Almost Ready	Open Channel Productions; Happening Films		
2007	Fast Lane	Happening Films		
2009	Neon Skin	Happening Films	National Film and Sound Archive - Orlando Short Film Award	Won
2011	Golden Girl	Happening Films		
2011	Colin the Dog's Fabulous Midnight Adventure and Another Story	Staple Fiction		
2012	The Wilding	Happening Films; Film Victoria	Iris Prize	Won
2012	The Wilding	Happening Films; Film Victoria	Madrid Lesbian, Gay and Transsexual Film Festival - Best Short Film	Won
2012	The Wilding	Happening Films; Film Victoria	St Kilda Film Festival - SBS Television Award	Won
2012	The Wilding	Happening Films; Film Victoria	Melbourne Queer Film Festival - Best Australian Short Film	Won
2012	The Wilding	Happening Films; Film Victoria	Melbourne Queer Film Festival - Audience Choice Award for Best Short Film	Won
2012	The Wilding	Happening Films; Film Victoria	Australian Screen Editors - Best Editing in a Short Film	Won
2012	The Wilding	Happening Films; Film Victoria	Queer Screen Mardi Gras Film Festival - Queer Perspective Award	Won
2012	The Wilding	Happening Films; Film Victoria	Show Me Shorts - Best International Short Film	Won
2012	The Wilding	Happening Films; Film Victoria	Australian Writers Guild - Best Short Film	Nominated
2012	The Wilding	Happening Films; Film Victoria	Berlin International Film Festival - Teddy Award	Nominated
2012	The Wilding	Happening Films; Film Victoria	Berlin International Film Festival - Crystal Bear	Nominated
2012	The Wilding	Happening Films; Film Victoria	Sydney Film Festival - Best Australian Short Film	Nominated
2014	Hurt's Rescue	Happening Films; The Festivals Company		
2015	Downriver	Screen Australia; Happening Films; Film Victoria; Melbourne International Film Festival	Screen Producers Australia Awards - Feature Film Production	Nominated
2015	Downriver	Screen Australia; Happening Films; Film Victoria; Melbourne International Film Festival	San Diego Film Out Film Festival - Best Film	Won
2015	Downriver	Screen Australia; Happening Films; Film Victoria; Melbourne International Film Festival	San Diego Film Out Film Festival - Best Director	Won
2015	Downriver	Screen Australia; Happening Films; Film Victoria; Melbourne International Film Festival	San Diego Film Out Film Festival - Best Actress (Kerry Fox)	Won
2015	Downriver	Screen Australia; Happening Films; Film Victoria; Melbourne International Film Festival	San Diego Film Out Film Festival - Breakout Talent (Reef Ireland)	Won
2015	Downriver	Screen Australia; Happening Films; Film Victoria; Melbourne International Film Festival	Iris Prize - Best Actress (Kerry Fox)	Won
2015	Downriver	Screen Australia; Happening Films; Film Victoria; Melbourne International Film Festival	Iris Prize - Best Actor (Thom Green)	Won
