= Iris Prize =

LGBTQ film prize and festival in Wales

- Type: Film Awards
- Sponsored by: The Michael Bishop Foundation
- Location: Cardiff
- Country: Wales
- Eligibility: Films created by, for, about, or of interest to members of the LGBTQ community
- Established: 2006; 20 years ago
- Website: irisprize.org

The Iris Prize is an international LGBTQ film prize and festival open to films by, for, about or of interest to gay, lesbian, bisexual, transgender or intersex audiences, and which must have been completed within two years of the prize deadline. It was launched in 2006 by Berwyn Rowlands.

== Overview ==
The prize is open to filmmakers from around the world and judged by a panel of international filmmakers and artists. The winner receives a prize package since 2025 valued at £40,000, enabling the winner to make their next film. It is awarded during an annual festival held in Cardiff that presents a programme of screenings including the competing films and several feature films, panel sessions with visiting filmmakers, and a closing night award ceremony.

The Iris Prize has secured the support of lesbian and gay film festivals from around the world, creating an international platform with the intention of raising the profile of lesbian and gay cinema and helping a new generation of filmmakers achieve success on the international stage. Each of the partner festivals selects one film annually to participate in the Iris Prize. The partner festivals include LGBTQ+film festivals in Toronto, Los Angeles, New York, Sydney, Dublin, San Francisco, Philadelphia, Hong Kong, and Rochester, New York.

The journalist Andrew Pierce became the first chair of the Iris Prize in 2013. Tom Abell, managing director of Peccadillo Pictures succeeded Pierce as chair in 2021.

In 2015 Iris Prize Outreach, a charity set up to challenge discrimination against LGBTQ+ people, was awarded funding from the National Lottery Community Fund to undertake an ambitious programme of community engagement across Wales over three years. A second project was awarded funding in 2020 and expected to see ten new short films made.

At the end of 2024 Iris Prize Outreach was awarded a grant of £137,500 to preserve and celebrate the heritage of Iris Prize by the National Lottery Heritage Fund. The Adleisiau Iris project will record oral histories and support the digitisation of the Iris archive.

== Past winners ==
=== Iris Prize Winners ===
- 2007 – Pariah by Dee Rees (USA)
- 2008 – Cowboy by Till Kleinert (Germany)
- 2009 – Steam by Eldar Rapaport (USA)
- 2010 – The Samaritan by Magnus Mork (Norway)
- 2011 – I Don't Want to Go Back Alone by Daniel Ribeiro (Brazil)
- 2012 – The Wilding by Grant Scicluna (Australia)
- 2013 – Gorilla by Tim Marshall (Australia)
- 2014 – All God's Creatures by Brendan McDonall (Australia)
- 2015 – Vessels by Arkasha Stevenson (USA)
- 2016 – Balcony by Toby Fell–Holden (UK)
- 2017 – Mother Knows Best by Mikael Bundsen (Sweden)
- 2018 – Three Centimetres by Lara Zeidan (Lebanon/UK)
- 2019 – Black Hat by Sarah Smith (USA)
- 2020 – Short Calf Muscle by Victoria Warmerdam (Netherlands)
- 2021 – Baba by Adam Ali and Sam Arbor (UK)
- 2022 – Tarneit by John Sheedy (Australia)
- 2023 – Scaring Women at Night by Karimah Zakia Issa (Canada)
- 2024 – Blood Like Water by Dima Hamdan (Palestine)
- 2025 – One Day This Kid by Alexander Farah (Canada)

=== Best British Short Winners ===
- 2007 – Private Life by Abbe Robinson
- 2008 – James by Connor Clements
- 2009 – Diana by Aleem Khan
- 2010 – Mosa by Ana Moreno
- 2011 – The Red Bike by Andrew Steggall
- 2012 – A Stable for Disabled Horses by Fabio Youniss
- 2013 – My Mother by Jay Bedwani
- 2014 – Middle Man by Charlie Francis
- 2015 – Closets by Lloyd Eyre–Morgan
- 2016 – Balcony by Toby Fell–Holden
- 2017 – We Love Moses by Dionne Edwards
- 2018 – BEYOND (There's Always a Black Issue, Dear) by Claire Lawrie
- 2019 – My Brother is a Mermaid by Alfie Dale
- 2020 – Better by Michael J Ferns
- 2021 – Baba by Adam Ali and Sam Arbor
- 2022 – Queer Parivaar by Shiva Raichandani
- 2023 – F**ked by Sara Harrak
- 2024 – Sister Wives by Louisa Connolly–Burnham
- 2025 – Blackout by Chris Urch

=== Iris Prize Best Feature Award Winners ===
- 2008 – Dream Boy by James Bolton (USA)
- 2009 – Redwoods by David Lewis (USA)
- 2010 – My Friend from Faro by Nana Neul (Germany)
- 2011 – August by Eldar Rapaport (USA)
- 2012 – Sex of Angels by Xavier Vilaverde (Spain)
- 2013 – Cupcakes (Bananot) by Eytan Fox (Israel)
- 2014 – Boy Meets Girl by Eric Schaeffer (USA)
- 2015 – 4th Man Out by Andrew Nackman (USA)
- 2016 – Real Boy by Shaleece Haas (USA)
- 2017 – Prom King, 2010 by Christopher Schaap (USA)
- 2018 – 1985 by Yen Tan (USA)
- 2019 – And Then We Danced by Levan Akin (Sweden/Georgia)
- 2020 – Cocoon by Leonie Krippendorff (Germany)
- 2021 – Rebel Dykes by Harri Shanahan and Siân A. Williams (UK)
- 2022 – Metamorphosis by Jose Enrique Tiglao (Philippines)
- 2023 – Femme by Sam H Freeman and Ng Choon Ping (UK)
- 2024 – Young Hearts by Anthony Schatteman (Belgium/Netherlands)
- 2025 – Plainclothes by Carmen Emmi (USA)

=== Best Performance in a Male Role (Feature Films) ===
- 2011 – Murray Bartlett, August
- 2012 – Ohad Knoller, Yossi
- 2013 – Ryan Steele, Five Dances
- 2014 – Michael Welch, Boy Meets Girl
- 2015 – Davide Capone, Darker Than Midnight (Più buio di mezzanotte)
- 2016 – Thom Green, Downriver
- 2017 – Miles Szanto, Teenage Kicks
- 2018 – Félix Maritaud, Sauvage
- 2019 – Henry Golding, Monsoon
- 2020 – Leandro Faria Lelo, Dry Wind (Vento seco)
- 2021 – Udo Kier, Swan Song
- 2022 – Giancarlo Commare, Mascarpone
- 2023 – Hubert Mikowski, Norwegian dream
- 2024 – Lou Goossens, Young Hearts
- 2025 – Russell Tovey, Plainclothes

=== Best Performance in a Male Role (Best British Shorts) ===
- 2022 – Gary Fannin, Jim
- 2023 – Emma D'Arcy, The Talent
- 2024 – Richard Wilson, G Flat and Dennis Grindel, Fairview Park
- 2025 – Jay Newton, Sleazy Tiger

=== Best Performance in a Female Role (Feature Films) ===
- 2011 – Allison Lane, Going Down in LA–LA Land
- 2012 – Kristina Valada–Viars, Molly's Girl
- 2013 – Sabine Wolf, Two Mothers
- 2014 – Kate Trotter, Tru Love
- 2015 – Sigrid ten Napel, Summer (Zomer)
- 2016 – Kerry Fox, Downriver
- 2017 – Fawzia Mirza, Signature Move
- 2018 – Jamie Chung, 1985
- 2019 – Linda Caridi, Mom + Mom
- 2020 – Lena Urzendowsy, Cocoon
- 2021 – Senan Kara, Not Knowing
- 2022 – Lacey Oake, Before I Change My Mind
- 2023 – Amrit Kaur, The Queen of My Dreams
- 2024 – Lucia Grasso, Vera and the Pleasure of Others
- 2025 – Ronke Adekoluejo, Dreamers

=== Best Performance in a Female Role (Best British Shorts) ===
- 2022 – Claudia Jolly, Tommies
- 2023 – Meg Salter, Rosalind Eleazar, F**ked
- 2024 – Louisa Connolly–Burnham, Sister Wives
- 2025 – Kat Ronney, Hot Young Geek Seeks Blood–sucking Freak

=== Best Performance Beyond the Binary (Feature Films) ===
- 2022 – Gold Azeron, Metamorphosis
- 2023 – Bishop Black, Captain Faggotron Saves the Universe
- 2024 – not awarded
- 2025 – not awarded

=== Best Performance Beyond the Binary (Best British Shorts) ===
- 2023 – Son of a Tutu, Lemon
- 2024 – Ashley Goh, Divine Intervention
- 2025 – Leah Harvey, Solers United

=== Youth Jury Award ===
- 2013 – Straight With You, Daan Bol (Netherlands)
- 2014 – Bombshell, Erin Sanger (USA)
- 2015 – Closets, Lloyd Eyre–Morgan (UK)
- 2016 – Sign, Andrew Keenan–Bolger (USA)
- 2017 – Lily, Graham Cantwell (Ireland)
- 2018 – Mrs McCutcheon, John Sheedy (Australia)
- 2019 – My Brother is a Mermaid, Alfie Dale (UK)
- 2020 – Wings, Jamie Weston (UK)
- 2021 – S.A.M., Neil Ely and Lloyd Eyre Morgan (UK)
- 2022 – Breathe, Harm van der Sanden (Netherlands)
- 2023 – Realness With A Twist, Cass Kaur Virdee (UK)
- 2024 – Jia, Vee Shi
- 2025 – With Love, Lottie, Lily Drummond (Australia)

=== Diva Box Office Award ===
- 2019 – Greta, Sparkman Clark (USA)

=== Co–op Audience Award ===
- 2020 – Wings by Jamie Weston
- 2021 – Birthday Boy by Leo Lebeau & James Bell
- 2022 – Jim by Tom Young
- 2023 – Ted & Noel by Julia Alcamo
- 2024 – Sister Wives by Louisa Connolly–Burnham
- 2025 – Two Black Boys in Paradise by Baz Sells

=== Elders' Jury Award ===
- 2025 – While We Still Have Time, Ava Grimshaw–Hall

=== Community Awards ===
- 2022, Community Short: Want/Need, Niamh Buckland
- 2022, Education Short: The Bed, Thalia Kent–Egan
- 2022, Micro short: Hold Me Close Please, Max Roberts
- 2023, Community Short: Where's Danny, Amy Pennington
- 2023, Education Short: The Fight in the Dog, Pamela Jikiemi
- 2023, Micro short: Trickle–Down Economics, Sophie Ansell
- 2024, Community Short: Three Letters | La Mamma Morta, Michael Graham
- 2024, Education Short: Forbidden Reverie, Yisong Huang
- 2024, Micro Short: Façade, Sophia Vi
- 2025, Community Short: Dysgu Hedfan, Juliette Manon
- 2025, Education Short: After Everything, Olivia Phillips, Connie Beck
- 2025, Micro Short: The Gardener, Efa Blosse–Mason

== List of partner festivals ==
Each of the partner festivals listed below will select one film that will be automatically shortlisted for the Iris Prize.

- Inside Out Film and Video Festival, Toronto (CA)
- Outfest – Los Angeles Gay and Lesbian Film Festival (US)
- Frameline – San Francisco International LGBT Film Festival (US)
- Hong Kong Lesbian and Gay Film Festival (CN)
- Queer Screen – Sydney's Mardi Gras Film Festival (AU)
- NewFest – New York Lesbian, Gay, Bisexual, & Transgender Film Festival (US)
- QFest Philadelphia (US)
- ImageOut: The Rochester LGBT Film & Video Festival (US)
- KASHISH Mumbai International Queer Film Festival (IN)
- Queer Lisboa – International Queer Film Festival (PT)
- Mezipatra, Prague (CZ)
- Oslo Fusion International Film Festival (NO)
- GAZE, Dublin (IE)
- Cheries, Cheris – Paris (FR)
- Roze Filmdagen, Amsterdam (NL)
- MIX Copenhagen (DK)
- Festival MIX Brasil, São Paulo (BR)
- Hamburg International Queer Film Festival (DE)
- Shanghai Pride Film Festival, Shanghai (CN)
- aGLIFF, Austin (US)
- Melbourne Queer Film Festival (AU)
- Scilia Queer, Palermo (IT)
- TLVFest, Tel–Aviv (IL)
- British Urban Film Festival, London (GB)

== See also ==
- List of LGBT–related awards
- LGBTQ culture in Cardiff
