= The Wilding =

- Directed by: Grant Scicluna
- Written by: Grant Scicluna
- Produced by: Jannine Barnes
- Starring: Reef Ireland; Shannon Glowacki; Luke Mullins; Frank Sweet
- Cinematography: Franc Biffone
- Edited by: Anthony Cox
- Music by: Alison Cole; Dave Smith
- Production company: Happening Films
- Release dates: 9 February 2012 (Germany, Berlin International Film Festival); 18 July 2012 (Australia, Sydney Film Festival)
- Running time: 16 minutes
- Country: Australia
- Language: English

The Wilding is a 2012 Australian gay drama film written and directed by Grant Scicluna and funded through Springboard, an initiative of Screen Australia. The film stars Reef Ireland, Shannon Glowacki, Luke Mullins and Frank Sweet and had its world premiere in competition at the Berlin International Film Festival on 9 February 2012 and was nominated for the Teddy Award.

The film competed at number of film festivals including Sydney Film Festival, Show Me Shorts, Melbourne Queer Film Festival, Palm Springs International Film Festival and St Kilda Film Festival and earned good reviews before winning the prestigious Iris Prize in 2012.

== Premise ==
Malcolm, a hardened borstal inmate, is in love with his cellmate Tye. As Malcolm faces an opportunity for parole, a feud with other inmates escalates, with Tye being targeted as Malcolm's weak spot. Malcolm is forced to choose between his own freedom and protecting the one he loves.

== Cast ==
- Reef Ireland as Malcolm
- Luke Mullins as Adam
- Frank Sweet as Gavin
- Shannon Glowacki as Tye
- Richard Anastasios as Simmo
- Lachlan Ward as Bosey

== Reception ==
=== Critical response ===
The film received mainly positive reviews with Adrian Naik of big gay picture show praising Scicluna's direction and said "This is raw Australian filmmaking at its best. Combining the visceral brutality of Romper Stomper and the gritty terror of Chopper, The Wilding holds its own against films of this caliber, while still shocking those numb to their effects."

=== Accolades ===
Year	Festival	Award	Recipient	Result
2012	Iris Prize	The Iris Prize for Best Short Film	Grant Scicluna	Won
2012	Madrid Lesbian, Gay and Transsexual Film Festival	Best Short Film	Grant Scicluna	Won
2012	St Kilda Film Festival	SBS Television Award	Grant Scicluna	Won
2012	Melbourne Queer Film Festival	Winner City of Melbourne Emerging Filmmaker	Grant Scicluna	Won
2012	Melbourne Queer Film Festival	Best Australian Short Film	Grant Scicluna	Won
2012	Australian Screen Editors	Best Editing in a Short Film	Anthony Cox	Won
2012	Show Me Shorts	Best International Short Film	Grant Scicluna & Jannine Barnes	Won
2012	Australian Writers Guild	Best Short Film	Grant Scicluna	Nominated
2012	Berlin International Film Festival	Teddy Award	Grant Scicluna	Nominated
2012	Berlin International Film Festival	Crystal Bear	Grant Scicluna	Nominated
2012	Sydney Film Festival	Best Australian Short Film	Grant Scicluna	Nominated
2013	Queer Screen Mardi Gras Film Festival	Queer Perspective Award	Grant Scicluna & Jannine Barnes	Won

== Filming locations ==
The film was shot in Sunbury in Australia and its surrounding suburbs.

== Feature film ==
In 2014 Screen Australia and Film Victoria announced investment in a feature film based on the short film, titled Downriver and will feature Ireland in the lead role.

== See also ==
- Cinema of Australia
