= Jia (film) =

2023 Australian short film

- Film poster
- Directed by: Vee Shi
- Written by: Vee Shi
- Produced by: Vee Shi; Taysha McFarland; Nicholson Ren
- Starring: Sel Hiew; Tyler Jenkins; Peter Isaac Koh
- Cinematography: Nicholson Ren
- Edited by: Vee Shi; Shannon Michaelas
- Music by: Luna Pan
- Production company: Niu Studios
- Release date: 15 January 2023
- Running time: 15 minutes
- Country: Australia
- Languages: English; Mandarin
- Budget: $15,000

Jia is a 2023 Australian short film written, co-produced, directed, and edited by Vee Shi. It was co-produced by Nicholson Ren and Taysha McFarland, with Nicholson also serving as the film's cinematographer. The film premiered at Flickerfest in 2023, and was nominated for Best Short Film at the 13th AACTA Awards.

== Plot ==
A grieving Chinese mother travels to Australia and embarks on a road trip with Eric to remember her late son. Ming's conservative values are tested when she learns that Eric was her son's lover.

== Cast ==
- Sel Hiew as Ming Yu
- Tyler Jenkins as Eric Hughes
- Peter Isaac Koh as Yao Chen

== Production ==
Jia received a $15,000 grant from AACTA, through their Pitch: Focus program. This also provided the addition of loaned equipment from Sony. The film was inspired by the director's personal relationship with his mother and was shot in a week across various locations in Victoria, Australia.

== Accolades ==
Award	Category	Recipient(s)	Result	Ref.
AACTA Awards	Best Short Film	Jia	Nominated	
Screen Producers Australia Awards	Short Film Production of the Year	Jia	Won	
AWGIE Awards	Short Film	Vee Shi	Won	
Australian Directors' Guild Awards	Best Direction in a Student Film	Vee Shi	Tie	
Flickerfest Awards	Best Direction in an Australian Short Film	Vee Shi	Won	
Flickerfest Awards	Best Actor	Sel Hiew	Honoured	
Melbourne Queer Film Festival Awards	Best Australian Short Film	Vee Shi	Won	
St Kilda Short Film Festival	2024 Top Short Films	Jia	Honoured	
Iris Prize	Youth Jury Award	Jia	Won	
Stellar Short Film Festival	Best Performance	Sel Hiew	Won	
Heart of Gold International Short Film Festival	Best Australian Film	Jia	Won	
Sardinia Queer Film Short Film Festival	AGedO Special Award	Jia	Won	
Sony Catchlight Film Festival	Best Cinematography (Fiction)	Nicholson Ren	Finalist	
Canberra Short Film Festival	Best Cinematography	Nicholson Ren	Won	
Melbourne Multicultural Film Festival	Best Short Fiction Film	Jia	Honoured	
Melbourne Multicultural Film Festival	People's Choice	Jia	Won	
