= Wild Sky =

- Directed by: Rachid B.
- Written by: Rachid B. Florent Mangeot
- Produced by: Sylvie Randonneix
- Narrated by: Rachid B.
- Cinematography: Arthur Forjonel; Rachid B.
- Edited by: Florent Mangeot
- Music by: Fabien Bourdier
- Distributed by: Nord-Ouest Documentaires
- Release date: April 12, 2011 (Visions du réel Film Festival)
- Running time: 42 minutes
- Countries: France; Switzerland
- Language: French

Wild Sky (French: Le Ciel en bataille) is a 2011 French autobiographical documentary film and cinematic essay/poem directed by Rachid B. and co-written by Florent Mangeot.

== Plot ==
At his dying father's bedside, Rachid B. recalls his strongest memories from his childhood in Morocco to recollections of his homosexuality and rejection of Christianity, right up to his recent conversion to Islam.

The film tells the story of his life, which he never shared with his father, and critics have praised it as "a powerful exploration of desire and of ones own identity."

== Release ==
In April 2011, the film premiered at the Visions du Réel film festival.

== Awards and recognition ==
- Best Documentary Feature and Best Documentary Director, LesGaiCineMad, Madrid International LGTB Film Festival, Spain, 2011.
- Special mention, Salina Doc Fest, Italy, 2011.
- Mention (short film competition), Les Écrans Documentaires, Arcueil, France, 2011.
- Nominated for the Best Doc-LGTIB award, Barcelona International Gay & Lesbian Film Festival, Spain, 2011.
- Clermont-Ferrand International Short Film Festival, National Competition, France, 2012.
