= Melbourne Film Festival =

Melbourne Film Festival may refer to:

- Melbourne International Film Festival
- Melbourne Underground Film Festival
- Melbourne Queer Film Festival
