= Jay Newton =

Scottish actor

- Occupation: Actor
- Years active: 2005–present

Jay Newton is a Scottish actor who has appeared in Shetland, River City and Our Ladies. He is possibly best known for starring as Alan opposite Alan Cumming in the short film Sleazy Tiger which earned him the Best Actor accolade at the 2025 edition of the Iris Prize festival. The film premiered at the 2025 edition of the Edinburgh International Film Festival.

== Filmography ==
=== Film ===
Year	Title	Role	Notes
2019	Our Ladies	Malkie Murphy	
2020	Marionette	Young man at accident	Short Film
2023	Glasgow Town	Suspect	Short Film
2024	Eighty-Six	Danny	Short Film
2025	Sleazy Tiger	Alan	Short Film

=== Television ===
Year	Title	Role	Notes
2007	River City	Sean Anderson	1 Episode
2009	Half Moon Investigations	Callum	1 Episode
2017	Clique	Party Goer	1 episode
2023	Payback	PC Francis Hewitson	3 Episodes
2024	Shetland	Coastguard	1 Episode

== Awards and nominations ==
Year	Nominated Work	Awards	Category	Result
2025	Sleazy Tiger	Iris Prize	Best Performance in a Male Role (Best British)	Won
