= Downriver (film) =

- Directed by: Grant Scicluna
- Screenplay by: Grant Scicluna
- Produced by: Jannine Barnes
- Starring: Robert Taylor; Kerry Fox; Helen Morse; Reef Ireland
- Cinematography: László Baranyai
- Edited by: Anthony Cox
- Music by: Lawrence English
- Production company: Happening Films
- Distributed by: Rialto Distribution (Australia)
- Release date: 7 August 2015 (MIFF)
- Running time: 99 minutes
- Country: Australia
- Language: English

Downriver is a 2015 Australian film funded by Screen Australia, Film Victoria and Melbourne International Film Festival, produced by Happening Films. It is writer-director Grant Scicluna's feature debut. The main cast includes Robert Taylor, Kerry Fox, Helen Morse and Reef Ireland. It is described as a mystery drama in which a teenage killer returns to uncover dark truths in his quest to find a missing body.

== Plot ==
James is a young man who has epilepsy and has recently been granted parole from the juvenile detention centre in which he has spent the last eight years. When he was ten, he drowned a little boy, Chris McCarthy, in a river at a caravan park, although the body was never found. After being released, he returns to the caravan park in order to find and return the body to the grieving mother. He moves into the old cabin he used to live in with his mother and befriends Damien, the boy next door. James tells Damien that Chris had been his brother. He is eventually joined at the park by his mother Paige and her new boyfriend, Wayne. Paige tells Wayne that James is her nephew and that her son died.

Despite the fact that his family took out a restraining order against James, James is approached by his former friend Anthony. Anthony was with him when he killed Chris and gave evidence that convicted James, leading to animosity between them. Anthony has turned into a lazy, drug-addicted hustler. He tries to dissuade James from looking for the body, reasoning that the local wild dogs probably took it. James refuses and in retaliation, Anthony seduces Damien.

James and Damien visit Mary, a local woman who keeps several dogs, to ask her about the possibility of the wild dogs taking the body. She dismisses the idea and mentions that Anthony and another boy, Ray, killed one of her dogs a few years back. Wracked with guilt, Ray came to her to confess. James then visits Ray and asks him about the dog they killed. Ray admits that he and Anthony were playing in the tunnels under the bridge with the dog until Anthony tricked the dog into jumping into a hole from which it couldn't escape. This gives James the idea that Anthony hid Chris's body in the tunnels under the bridge.

James discusses his search with Paige. She reveals that after the drowning, James had an epileptic seizure and Anthony got him help, not leaving his side until many hours later. This leads James to realise that Anthony could not have hidden the body.

James organises a fishing trip with Damien's family and Wayne near the bridge. He sneaks off and explores the tunnels. Though he finds the hole Ray mentioned, it is filled with water and he is unable to search it further. When he returns to the others, Damien reveals that Chris didn't have any brothers and guesses that James was his killer. He tells him to stay away from his family. The stress causes James to have a seizure in the water and he nearly drowns. When they return to the park, Wayne reveals to Paige that he knows James is her son.

Finally James visits Amos, who owns the local shop and has been blackmailed by Anthony for many years. Amos reveals that Anthony and his brother Joe once had a younger sister, Bettina, who suddenly disappeared one day and the family never spoke of her again.

In the meantime, Damien goes to Anthony's house. Anthony is away so he talks to his father Gianni. His attempts at conversation, relating a story Anthony told him about a drowned baby, raise Gianni's suspicions. Gianni knocks Damien unconscious and Joe drives him away in the car. When Anthony returns home later, Gianni beats him and questions him about what he has been saying about his sister, someone Anthony clearly doesn't remember.

James returns home to Paige and tearfully reveals what happened the day of the drowning. Anthony, with vague recollections of Bettina, had asked James to 'steal him a sister'. They had selected Chris, lured him away from his family, and played with him on the riverbank until Anthony started abusing Chris and pressured James to drown the boy before they got in trouble for their 'theft'. Paige then remembers that although Anthony was there all evening, he did speak to Joe, giving Joe an opportunity to move the body.

Joe and Anthony then arrive and attempt to blackmail James into abandoning his search by beating Damien. This makes James even more determined to bring the family to justice. James and Damien escape to Mary's house, where they reconcile.

The next morning, James returns to the tunnels under the bridge with Damien and Mary, along with ropes and torches. James climbs down into the water filled hole and eventually finds Chris's body, along with an even more decomposed body of a little girl, presumably Bettina.

== Cast ==
- Reef Ireland as James – A young man recently paroled from detention for drowning a young boy as a child. He returns to the scene of the crime to locate the missing body.
- Thom Green as Anthony – James' amoral former friend who was with him when James drowned the young boy.
- Kerry Fox as Paige Levy – James' mother. She struggles with her grief by telling people that her son died and James is her nephew.
- Robert Taylor as Wayne – Paige's goodnatured, truck-driving new boyfriend.
- Charles Grounds as Damien – bad-tempered boy who lives in the cabin next to James. He struggles to decide whether to have a relationship with James or with Anthony.
- Helen Morse as Mary – reclusive woman who cares for several dogs, while baiting and killing the wild dogs.
- Steve Mouzakis as Gianni Depellegrini – Anthony's abusive father.
- Lester Ellis Jr. as Joe – Anthony's brutal older brother.
- Sebastian Robinson as Amos – owner of the local shop, Cowboy Coffee. He formerly had a relationship with Anthony and has been blackmailed ever since.
- Shannon Glowacki as Ray Lewis – mentally disturbed boy who is a victim of Anthony's manipulations.
- Lee Cormie as Trav – James' boyfriend in detention.
- Elena Mandalis as Rita – James' parole officer.
- Alicia Gardiner as Dana McCarthy – mother of the boy James drowned. She meets with James before he is paroled, pleading for the location of her son's body.
- Eddie Baroo as Gary

== Production ==
=== Filming ===
Filming began and completed in late 2014 in Warrandyte.

=== Short film ===
Downriver is an expansion of Scicluna's short film The Wilding, which won the Iris Prize in 2012; it was developed through Screen Australia's Springboard production funding and features Reef Ireland in the lead role.

== Release and reception ==
=== Premiere ===
The film had its premiere at the Melbourne International Film Festival (MIFF) on 7 August 2015 with much publicity. It sold out all three scheduled screenings, and the festival added a fourth screening to satisfy ticket demand. Downriver's international premiere was at the Toronto International Film Festival on 15 September 2015. It was released theatrically in Australia in 2016.

=== Critical response ===
Downriver received many positive reviews from critics on its Australian premiere. Ali Schnabel from The Age described it as "brutal, gritty and unflinching [...] populated with real characters". Laura Henderson from The Conversation said it was "a tangled, tense and mercurial work [...] a visually stunning piece, with superb performances and an utterly gripping story".

=== Accolades ===
Year	Festival	Award	Recipient(s)	Result
2015	Screen Producers Australia Awards	Best Feature Film Production	Happening Films	Nominated
2015	MiFo LGBT Film Festival	Best Feature Film (Jury Prize)	Grant Scicluna	Won
2015	Asia Pacific Screen Awards	Best Performance by an Actor	Reef Ireland	Nominated
2016	San Diego Out Film Festival	Best Feature Film	Happening Films	Won
2016	San Diego Out Film Festival	Best Director	Grant Scicluna	Won
2016	San Diego Out Film Festival	Best Supporting Actress	Kerry Fox	Won
2016	San Diego Out Film Festival	Best Breakout Performance	Reef Ireland	Won
2016	Iris Prize	Best Actress	Kerry Fox	Won
2016	Iris Prize	Best Actor	Thom Green	Won

== See also ==
- List of lesbian, gay, bisexual or transgender-related films of 2015
- Cinema of Australia
