= Of an Age =

2022 film by Goran Stolevski

- US release poster
- Directed by: Goran Stolevski
- Written by: Goran Stolevski
- Produced by: Kristina Ceyton; Samantha Jennings
- Starring: Elias Anton; Thom Green; Hattie Hook
- Cinematography: Matthew Chuang
- Edited by: Goran Stolevski
- Production companies: Screen Australia; VicScreen; Melbourne International Film Festival Premiere Fund; Headgear Films; Causeway Films
- Distributed by: Roadshow Films
- Release dates: 4 August 2022 (MIFF); 17 February 2023 (United States); 23 March 2023 (Australia)
- Running time: 100 minutes
- Country: Australia
- Language: English
- Box office: $775,781

Of an Age is a 2022 Australian romantic drama film written and directed by Goran Stolevski.

== Synopsis ==
The film stars Elias Anton as Kol, a Serbian immigrant in Australia who enters a brief but intense romance with Adam (Thom Green), the brother of his ballroom dance partner Ebony (Hattie Hook).

== Cast ==
- Elias Anton as Nikola 'Kol' Denic
- Thom Green as Adam Donegal
- Hattie Hook as Ebony Donegal
- Senuri Chandrani as Jaya
- Toby Derrick as Jacob
- Grace Graznak as Coral Birch
- Jessica Lu as Jenny
- Jack Kenny as Travis Mellor
- Kasuni Imbulana as Tari
- Verity Higgins as Fay Donegal
- Milijana Cancar as Kol's Mother

== Release ==
The film premiered on 4 August 2022 at the Melbourne International Film Festival. It was subsequently screened at CinefestOZ, where it was the winner of the Best Film Award. Of an Age was released in the United States by Focus Features on 17 February 2023, and later in Australia by Roadshow Films on 23 March 2023.

== Critical reception ==
On the review aggregator website Rotten Tomatoes, 88% of 74 critics' reviews are positive, with an average rating of 7.8/10. The website's consensus reads: "While it may not belong in the upper ranks of cinematic queer love stories, Of an Age is a moving romance elevated by powerhouse performances." Metacritic, which uses a weighted average, assigned the film a score of 69 out of 100, based on 18 critics, indicating "generally favorable" reviews.

Critic Manuel Betancourt of Variety wrote a glowing review of the film; he stated: "The Australian production is a warm-hearted gem, pulsating with lustful tenderness as it sketches what first love can feel like, and asking whether it can ever endure." Similarly, writing for The Guardian, Michael Sun also praised the story and its atmosphere, writing: "In other hands, Of an Age could have been gimmicky or indulgent but Stolevski imbues his characters with such lived-in specificity that we can’t help but be swept away." In the San Francisco Chronicle, David Lewis also praised the story, saying: "Sublimely capturing the enchantment and mental haze of first love — when everything around you seems to stand still — Of an Age is a lyrical romantic drama that never fails to captivate with its quiet power and surprisingly big heart." and concluding: "Nothing about Of an Age seems forced. The film delicately embraces grand sentiments without ever being sentimental. And throughout the journey, we can't help but be enthralled."

In the Chicago Reader, John Wilmes praised the atmosphere of the film, writing: "Of an Age opens with a sequence worthy of entry into The Cinema of Stress library", comparing the film to the likes of Uncut Gems and Dog Day Afternoon. He concluded with: "The dilemma of Goran Stolevski’s movie is classic, badly timed romance stuff, a real One Last Night affair.... It's as good as those things get—a memorable blast of humanity and nostalgia." In Slant Magazine, Richard Scott Larson said: "The ambivalence with which the film treats its main character’s revelation proves rich with complication and offers a new intervention into a genre we thought we’d fully internalized."
