= Eldar Rapaport =

American-Israeli film director

Eldar Rapaport (Hebrew: אלדר רפפורט) is an American-Israeli film director, screenwriter and producer, best known for his 2011 feature film August.

Originally from Tel Aviv, he moved to the United States in 1991 to attend Emerson College and the New York University Film School. He won the Iris Prize in 2009 for his third short film Steam.

He is currently based in New York, where he works as Chief Creative Officer for the digital media production firm Screenz. He has also served on the jury for the Iris Prize several times since his own award win.

== Films ==
- Tremor (2003)
- Postmortem (2005)
- Steam (2009)
- August (2011)
- Little Man (2012)
- The Last Survivor (2018)
