= Darci Shaw =

English actress (born 2002)

- Born: Darci Louise Shaw; 17 April 2002 (age 24); Liverpool, England
- Education: The Belvedere Academy
- Alma mater: Liverpool Institute for Performing Arts
- Occupation: Actress
- Years active: 2017–present

Darci Louise Shaw (born 17 April 2002) is an English actress. Her films include Judy (2019), The Colour Room (2021) and Midas Man (2024). On television, she is known for her roles in the Netflix series The Irregulars (2021), the Disney+ series A Thousand Blows (2025–present) and the BBC One series This City Is Ours (2025–present).

== Early life ==
Shaw was born to Peter and Louise Shaw in Liverpool. She grew up in the suburb of Mossley Hill, where she attended The Belvedere Academy. She took Saturday acting classes at the Liverpool Institute for Performing Arts (LIPA) from the age of 5 and then joined the Everyman and Playhouse Youth Theatre at the age of 14, participating weekly and appearing in the company's Fiddler on the Roof and Romeo and Juliet productions in 2017.

== Career ==
Shaw made her film debut in 2019, playing young Judy Garland in the award-winning film Judy alongside Renée Zellweger. Rolling Stone described Shaw's performance as "truly stellar".

Shaw played Holly Meredith in Morecambe-based ITV crime drama The Bay alongside Morven Christie and Chanel Cresswell. In 2021, Shaw began starring as Jessie in The Irregulars, a Netflix paranormal show based on the world of Sherlock Holmes.

Sky UK announced that Shaw would appear in a film about the British ceramic artist Clarice Cliff titled The Colour Room, alongside Phoebe Dynevor in the lead role, as well as Matthew Goode, David Morrissey, Kerry Fox and Luke Norris. The film premiered in 2021.

She portrays Cilla Black in the 2024 Brian Epstein biopic Midas Man. That year, she began filming BBC One crime drama This City Is Ours. She also had roles in Steven Knight's historical drama A Thousand Blows and alongside Catherine Zeta-Jones in Kill Jackie.

== Filmography ==
=== Film ===
| Year | Title | Role | Notes |
|---|---|---|---|
| 2019 | Judy | Teenage Judy Garland | |
| 2019 | Bitter Sky | Nia | Short film |
| 2021 | The Colour Room | Dot | Sky Cinema |
| 2024 | Midas Man | Cilla Black | |

=== Television ===
| Year | Title | Role | Notes |
|---|---|---|---|
| 2019 | The Bay | Holly Meredith | 4 episodes |
| 2021 | The Irregulars | Jessie | Main role; 8 episodes |
| 2022 | Brassic | Amy Croft | 1 episode |
| 2025–present | A Thousand Blows | Alice Diamond | |
| 2025–present | This City Is Ours | Melissa Sullivan | |
| 2026 | Kill Jackie | Gwen | |
