= Savage River (TV series) =

Australian TV series

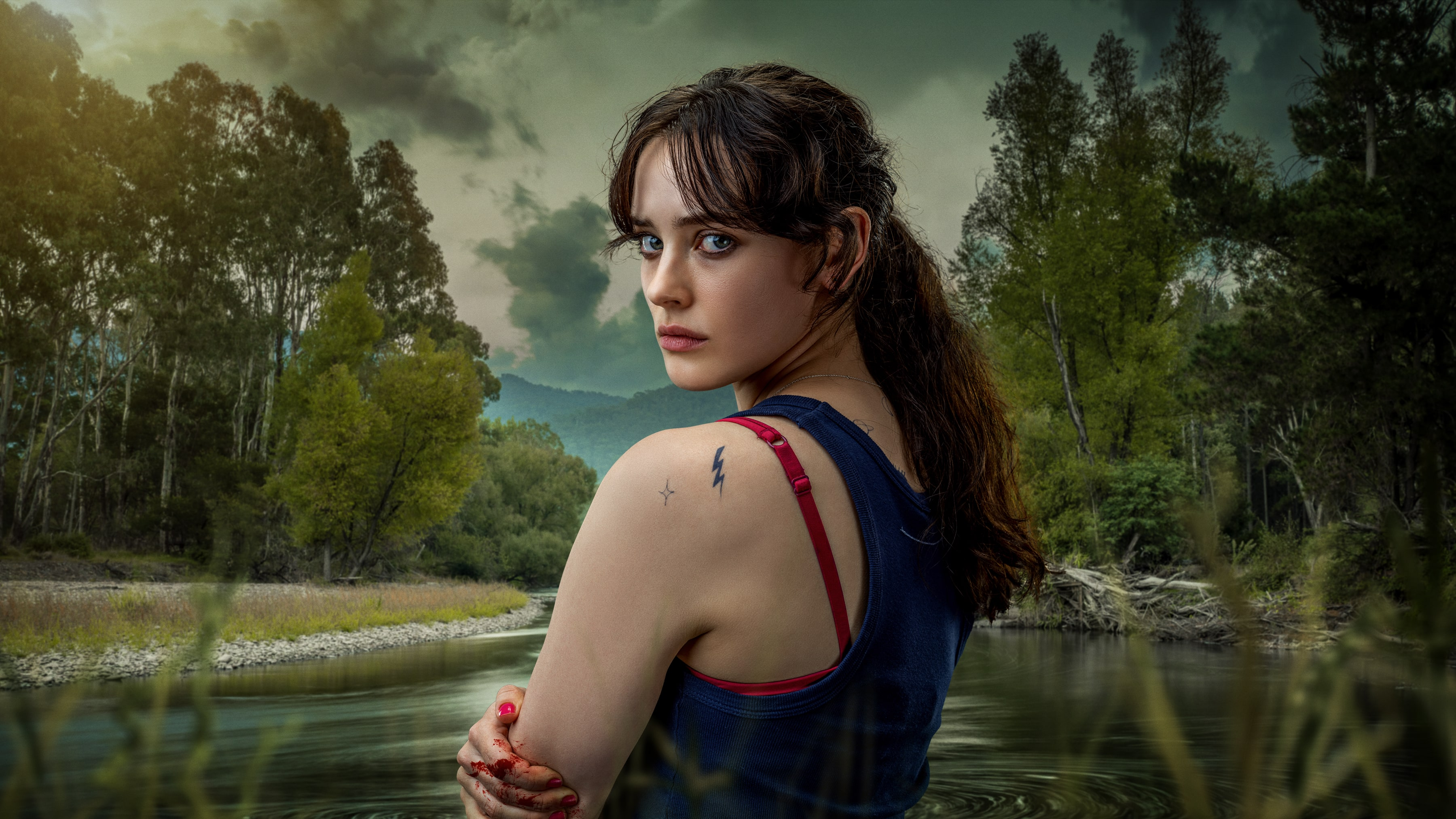
- Katherine Langford in a promotional image for the series.
- Genre: Crime drama
- Written by: Giula Sandler; Belinda Bradley; Franz Docherty
- Directed by: Jocelyn Moorhouse
- Starring: Katherine Langford; Virginia Gay; Jacqueline McKenzie
- Country of origin: Australia
- Original language: English
- No. of seasons: 1
- No. of episodes: 6 (list of episodes)

Production
- Producers: Angie Fielder; Polly Staniford
- Production location: Victoria, Australia
- Cinematography: Don McAlpine
- Production company: Aquarius Films

Original release
- Network: ABC TV iview
- Release: 4 September – 2 October 2022

Savage River is a six-part Australian crime drama, produced by Aquarius Films, which premiered on ABC TV and iview on 4 September 2022. Set in country Victoria, the series is led by director Jocelyn Moorhouse and cinematographer Don McAlpine, and stars Katherine Langford, Virginia Gay and Jacqueline McKenzie.

== Synopsis ==
Miki Anderson returns to her hometown in rural Victoria after ten years in prison, intending to get on with her life. However, after a murder is committed in the town and the townspeople suspect Miki, she must set out to prove her innocence.

== Cast ==
- Katherine Langford as Miki Anderson
- Mark Coles Smith as Joel Thorpe
- Robert Grubb as Senior Sgt Bill Kirby
- Cooper Van Grootel as Terry Anderson
- Nadine Garner as Lynne Anderson
- Jacqueline McKenzie as Colleen Lang
- Jack Kenny as Adam Lang
- Daniel Henshall as Kevin Pattison
- Bernard Curry as Connor Kirby
- James Mackay as Simon Englert
- Richard Piper as Max Englert
- Andrew Gilbert as Hugh Lang
- Leah Vandenberg as Deborah Cochrane
- Amesh Edireweera as Ranil Perera
- Osamah Sami as Salim Bayati
- Maia Abbas as Jamila Bayati
- Miranda Anwar as Chandra Pattison
- Rajan Velu as Sujan Nadesan
- Julian Weeks as Nick Healey
- Molly Grace as Jasmine Lang
- Ayesha Gibson as Taylah Russell
- Hattie Hook as Ivy Pattison
- Sally-Anne Upton as Dale O'Neil
- Benjamin Moore as Wayan Pattison
- Bev Killick as Brenda May
- Virginia Gay as Detective Sergeant Rachel Kennedy
- Hannah Bickerton as Ocean Anderson

== Episodes ==
No.	Title	Directed by	Written by	Original release date	Australia viewers (millions)
1	"Episode 1"	Jocelyn Moorhouse	Giula Sandler, Belinda Bradley, Franz Docherty	4 September 2022	814,000
After spending ten years in prison for the manslaughter of her best friend Jasmine Lang when they were both teens, Miki Anderson returns to her hometown in the Australian High Country and moves in with her brother Terry. As she explores the town and searches for work, many locals taunt or shun her. As a gesture of goodwill, she reveals to Jasmine's father Hugh Lang the location of a time capsule that she and Jasmine made. He screams at her to leave, but later finds the time capsule. Miki takes a job at Savage River's abattoir, where many other staff are refugees who are exploited by the owner Kevin Pattison who knows they have few other options to avoid deportation. One of the other staff, Jamila, is concerned about her sister Laila's extended absence, but Jamila's husband Salim believes Laila has run off with a lover. Hugh confronts Kevin about the labour conditions and they argue. Another abattoir worker, Nick, fakes friendliness and then locks Miki in a freezer with animal carcasses after her shift. She escapes hours later and the dead body of Hugh Lang falls on top of her, covering her in blood. She flees to her estranged mother's home.
2	"Episode 2"	Jocelyn Moorhouse	Giula Sandler, Belinda Bradley, Franz Docherty	11 September 2022	627,000
Miki's mother Lynne insists that Miki remain silent about Hugh Lang's death because of the likelihood she will be blamed. Miki returns to work and finds the murder scene scrubbed clean and no security footage. Hugh's family become worried and begin searching for him. His wife Colleen calls his brother in Melbourne and discovers that he lied about the reason for his recent trip there. Three local teens, including Kevin Pattison's daughter Ivy, get high and joyride in Hugh's abandoned car, then discover blood in the boot. Jamila asks Senior Sgt. Bill Kirby for help finding Laila, but is not taken seriously. Miki is persuaded to attend a town festival, where Colleen Lang blames her for Hugh's disappearance. During the fireworks, Hugh's body is found in the river. Detective Rachel Kennedy, Kevin's ex and Ivy's mother, returns to Savage River to investigate Hugh's murder, and informs Miki she is a suspect.
3	"Episode 3"	Jocelyn Moorhouse	Unknown	18 September 2022	708,000
Rachel begins interviewing residents of Savage River. Terry Anderson spends time with Kevin Pattison's wife Chandra and she accidentally reveals the family's intentions to sell the meatworks and move to Asia, then asks Terry to tell nobody. Jamila makes missing person posters featuring a photo of Laila and posts them around town. Rachel attempts to reconnect with Ivy, who is disdainful, but reveals the location of Hugh Lang's car to her mother. Papers found in his car allow Rachel to discover that he traveled to Melbourne with Laila, who had an appointment in the maternity ward of a women's hospital. Laila returns to Savage River on a bus late at night, apparently well.
4	"Episode 4"	Jocelyn Moorhouse	Unknown	25 September 2022	323,000
Rachel and Bill interview Salim. Laila returns to the home while the police are there, and reveals that Hugh took her to Melbourne for an abortion and that Nick was the father. Someone sends a text message to the police informing them that they should search the meatworks to find the knife used to murder Hugh Lang. Arriving at work, Miki finds the knife planted in her locker and hides it in her boot. Miki becomes ill and leaves work early, then deliberates with Lynne about what to do with the knife. Lynne offers to take it to the police, but changes her mind after hearing them talk about arresting Miki. Miki has flashbacks and remembers Jasmine telling her about her secret affair with an older man. Rumours spread about the potential sale of the meatworks ahead of a town hall meeting at which the two mayoral candidates will debate. The town hall meeting becomes rowdy as locals protest the sale. The police take the stage to ask for information about the murder weapon, and Miki hands it to them in front of everyone, causing a riot, and is arrested.
5	"Episode 5"	Jocelyn Moorhouse	Giula Sandler, Belinda Bradley, Franz Docherty	2 October 2022	323,000
Joel and Nick destroy Kevin Pattison's car in front of the investors, causing them to back out of the meatworks purchase. Lynne convinces Deborah Cochrane, a local solicitor and one of the two candidates for mayor, to act as Miki's legal representative. Deborah proposes to the townsfolk that they buy the meatworks and operate it as a collective, but her announcement is marred by people's displeasure that she is representing Miki, who they believe murdered Hugh Lang. Miki has an encounter with her former teacher Simon and reveals she believed he was the older man that Jasmine was involved with, but he emphatically denies it. Miki reads Jasmine's diary, finds that she referred to her lover as 'K', and suspects Kevin Pattison. Salim reveals to Miki and Joel that he has been stealing meat and selling it to supplement his illegally low wages, and that he saw Kevin loading 'something big' into Hugh Lang's car the night of the murder. Despite his fears of deportation, Salim tells the police what he saw. Rachel confronts Kevin at home and arrests him on suspicion of murder.
6	"Episode 6"	Jocelyn Moorhouse	Giula Sandler, Belinda Bradley, Franz Docherty	2 October 2022	323,000
In a flashback scene, Hugh Lang reads Jasmine's other diary which was inside the time capsule, then makes an angry phone call. Kevin confesses to the police that he is deeply in debt and disposed of Hugh's body to avoid drama at the meatworks during the sale arrangements but denies killing him. Miki tells Colleen about Jasmine's diaries and they conclude that Hugh was murdered by K to cover up K's molestation of Jasmine. Miki suspects that K is Connor Kirby, the local pharmacist, Deborah's husband and Jasmine's former employer. She visits Deborah and Connor's home and searches it while Deborah is in the shower, finding a container of the cleaning agent that was used to clean the murder weapon. Miki shows a photo of the container to Rachel, then texts Connor to meet her at the meatworks and tells Rachel to follow. Rachel is distracted by the revelation that Ivy is missing. Connor suggests to Ivy (his current teen employee) that they run away together and she agrees and gets in his car, but he drives to the meatworks to confront Miki. Bill Kirby reveals to Rachel that Connor has Ivy and that Bill has been covering for him because Connor is his son. Rachel arrives at the meatworks as Connor threatens both Miki and Ivy with a captive bolt pistol and Connor is accidentally killed during the struggle. Miki decides to leave Savage River, but as she waits for the bus, Rachel reveals that she found evidence implying that Jasmine was smothered and not drowned, and that Miki was probably not responsible for her death. Rachel offers to re-open the case and suggests to Miki that she should stay.

== Production ==
The six-part series was directed by Jocelyn Moorhouse and is co-created by writers Belinda Bradley, Franz Docherty and lead writer Giula Sandler.

It was filmed in Melbourne, Warburton in the Yarra Valley, and in Bright and Myrtleford in the High Country of Victoria. Cinematography was by Don McAlpine.

It was produced by Angie Fielder and Polly Staniford of Aquarius Films for ABC Television. Funding was provided by Screen Australia with support from VicScreen through production investment and the Regional Location Assistance Fund.

== Release ==
Savage River premiered on ABC TV and iview on 4 September 2022.

== Critical response ==
Travis Johnson, writing on Flicks, found the series too long to sustain interest. Emma Maguire found it a gripping example of the "Australian Gothic" genre: "When Miki gets a job at the abattoir we see a brutal reality: Savage River is a town built on blood and slaughter, a truth that references the colonial violence at the foundation of modern Australia".
