= Hattie Hook =

Australian actress

- Occupations: Actress; Dancer
- Years active: 2019–present
- Television: Ten Pound Poms

Hattie Hook is an Australian stage, film and television actress, and dancer. Her film credits include Of an Age (2022). Her television credits include Ten Pound Poms (2023-2025) and Kill Jackie (2026).

== Career ==
Hook grew up in Mount Eliza, Victoria, where she trained in dance. Appearing onstage, Hook had her first professional role in a production of Annie. Her early stage credits include productions of Mary Poppins and Gypsy. She was announced by the Casting Guild of Australia (CGA) as a Rising Star for 2022.

That year, Hook made her feature film debut as Ebony in 2022 Melbourne-set Australian romantic drama film Of an Age which opened the 2022 Melbourne International Film Festival. She described the character as "an absolute tornado of a person. Making that film was one of the best experiences of my life". Hook also appeared in television series Savage River (2022).

The following year, Hook played teen mother Pattie in two series of British-Australian historical drama series Ten Pound Poms (2023-2025) for Stan and BBC One. In preparation for the role, Hook lived with a robotic baby designed to mimic a newborn, including the need for regular nappy changes and random crying during the night. She returned for the second series in 2025. That year, she also appeared in television miniseries adaptation The Narrow Road to the Deep North (2025).

Hook appeared as Charlie alongside Catherine Zeta-Jones in Amazon Prime Video thriller series Kill Jackie (2026). Hook has an upcoming role in Carey and Chad Hayes film Train.

== Filmography ==
Key
†	Denotes works that have not yet been released

Year	Title	Role	Notes
2019	My Life Is Murder	Young Alexa	1 episode
2022	Of an Age	Ebony	Film
2022	Savage River	Ivy Pattinson	6 episodes
2023–2025	Ten Pound Poms	Pattie	12 episodes
2025	The Narrow Road to the Deep North	Joan	1 episode
2026	Kill Jackie	Charlie	
TBA	Train†		
