= Prom King, 2010 =

- Poster
- Directed by: Christopher Schaap
- Written by: Christopher Schaap
- Produced by: Isabella Jackson
- Starring: Christopher Schaap; Adam Lee Brown; Nicole Wood
- Cinematography: Aharon Rothschild; Aitor Mendilibar
- Edited by: Nikolai Metin
- Music by: Dylan T.E. Payne
- Production companies: Suzanne Charles Pictures; Plural Image Films
- Release date: March 3, 2017
- Running time: 96 minutes
- Country: United States
- Language: English

Prom King, 2010 is a 2017 LGBT coming-of-age drama film written and directed by Christopher Schaap, in his directorial debut. It stars Schaap with Adam Lee Brown and Nicole Wood.

== Plot ==
The film tells the story of a gay college student, Charlie, a lovable but naive young man trying to navigate the New York City dating scene with its endless online encounters, strange chats and cute freshman boys. He loves classic movies and yearns to meet "the one" in a kind of old-fashioned Hollywood fantasy. But he also wants a real connection with someone, not just dating apps and casual sex. Still hurting from his first relationship with a Mormon boy in high school, Charlie first falls for a guy who's already in a relationship and just wants sex, and then for a closeted freshman who soon decides he's not ready to come out. He also falls for his best friend, who loves him but just wants to stay friends. Eventually he begins to fear that his sexuality is actually preventing him from finding the love of his life.

== Cast ==
- Christopher Schaap as Charlie
- Julia Weldon as Jules
- Adam Lee Brown as Thomas
- Laura Dowling Shea as Aunt Val
- Frans Dam as Ford
- Matthew Brown as Ben
- Nicole Wood as Grace
- Richard Brundage as Dad
- Tyler Austin as Aaron
- Mark Lee as Finley
- Aaron Luis Profumo as Hank
- Rosanne Rubino as Mom

== Release ==
=== Film Festivals ===
- 3 March 2017, Cinequest Film Festival
- 25 April 2017, OUTshine Film Festival, Miami
- 26 May 2017, Seattle International Film Festival
- 31 May 2017, Inside Out Toronto LGBT Film Festival
- 9 June 2017, Tel Aviv International LGBT Film Festival
- 19 June 2017, Frameline Film Festival
- 9 July 2017, Outfest Los Angeles LGBT Film Festival

== Awards ==
Year	Festival	Recipient	Awards	Notes
2017	Iris Prize	Prom King, 2010	Best Feature	
2017	Rhode Island International Film Festival	Prom King, 2010	Alternative Spirit Award: Grand Prize	
2017	Cinequest Film Festival	Christopher Schaap	New Vision Award	
