= Kill Jackie =

British television series

- Genre: Thriller
- Created by: Tom Butterworth; Conor Keane; Peter Lawson; Damon Thomas
- Based on: The Price You Pay by Aidan Truhen
- Starring: Catherine Zeta-Jones; Daniel Ings; Darci Shaw; Sidse Babett Knudsen; Christine Adams; Julian Rhind-Tutt; Julian Barratt; Sebastian Armesto; Hattie Hook; Raff Law; Enzo Cilenti; Óscar Jaenada; Jonathan Cake; Bill Paterson; Ron Perlman
- Opening theme: "The Price You Pay" by Ladyhawke
- Composer: Matteo Zingales
- Country of origin: United Kingdom
- Original language: English
- No. of series: 1
- No. of episodes: 8

Production
- Executive producers: Catherine Zeta-Jones; Peter Lawson; Jose Augustin Valdes; Dante Di Loreto; Tom Butterworth; Damon Thomas; Rebecca Dundon; Jeffrey Levine
- Producer: José Luis Escolar
- Cinematography: Xavi Giménez; Jaime Feliu-Torres; Imanol Nabea
- Editors: Byron Smith; Fiona Starogarozki; Sadaf Nazari; Dan Gage; Jo Smyth
- Running time: 42–48 minutes
- Production companies: Fremantle; Steel Springs Pictures; Amazon MGM Studios

Original release
- Network: Amazon Prime Video
- Release: 2 October 2026 – present

Kill Jackie is a television series for Amazon Prime Video starring Catherine Zeta-Jones, adapted from the Nick Harkaway novel The Price You Pay under his pseudonym Aidan Truhen. It premiered on 2 October 2026.

== Premise ==
A wealthy art dealer with a secret past discovers she's the target of a lethal squad of hitmen known as The Seven Demons. Rather than fleeing, she uses her dark web connections and brutal ingenuity to hunt down the killers one by one.

== Cast ==
=== Main ===
- Catherine Zeta-Jones as Jackie Price
- Daniel Ings as Sam, Jackie's lawyer
- Darci Shaw as Gwen
- Sidse Babett Knudsen as Karenina
- Christine Adams as The Doc
- Julian Rhind-Tutt as Friedrich
- Julian Barratt as Tucker
- Sebastian Armesto as The Cuban
- Hattie Hook as Charlie
- Raff Law as Sean Harper / The Yank
- Enzo Cilenti as Don Markel
- Óscar Jaenada as Zigor
- Jonathan Cake as Mr. Linden
- Bill Paterson as Ewan
- Ron Perlman as Sean Senior

=== Supporting ===
- Kārlis Arnolds Avots as Akilles
- Set Sjöstrand as Tuukka
- Tadashi Ito as Li Dong
- Gavin Spokes as Billy
- Bamshad Abedi-Amin as Leo Baxter
- Andrew MacBean as Didi
- Peter Nikolas as The Albanian
- Keith Khan as The Indian
- Julia Fossi as Debbs
- Yago Sanzu as Don Markel Junior
- Bill Bekele as Ollie
- Levi Mattey as Tyler
- Paloma Montero as Mariella
- Ryan Nolan as Aled
- Rithvik Andugula as Colin
- Daniel Blasco as Dai
- Dermot Arrigan as Paley
- Sandra Yi as Ulla
- Andoni Lauzurica as Elka
- Oihan Carramiñana as Sushi Kid

== Episodes ==
No.	Title	Directed by	Written by	Original release date
1	"Burning Down The House"	Damon Thomas	Tom Butterworth; Conor Keane	2 October 2026
2	"Invaders Must Die"	Damon Thomas	Tom Butterworth; Conor Keane	2 October 2026
3	"She's Gone"	Damon Thomas	Tom Butterworth	2 October 2026
4	"Cocaine Blues"	Dawn Shadforth	Tom Butterworth	2 October 2026
5	"Here She Comes"	Damon Thomas	Conor Keane	2 October 2026
6	"Me and the Devil"	Dawn Shadforth	Tom Butterworth	2 October 2026
7	"The Mamas and the Papas"	Dawn Shadforth; Sophie Muller	Tom Butterworth; Conor Keane	2 October 2026
8	"Wind of Change"	Dawn Shadforth; Sophie Muller	Tom Butterworth	2 October 2026

== Production ==
The series is from Amazon Prime Video, starring Catherine Zeta-Jones. It is based on the novel The Price You Pay, written by author Nick Harkaway as his pseudonym Aidan Truhen. The eight-part series is adapted by Tom Butterworth and Conor Keane and directed by Damon Thomas. It is co-produced by Fremantle and Steel Springs Pictures. The executive producers are Peter Lawson and Jose Augustin Valdes for Steel Springs, Dante Di Loreto for Fremantle, Jeffrey Levine, Butterworth, Thomas and Zeta-Jones. Keane created and co-wrote the TV adaptation and is associate producer. José Luis Escolar's Deabru Kalea Filmeak is supervising production in Bizkaia.

The cast was expanded in April 2025 to include Daniel Ings, Darci Shaw, Raff Law, Julian Barratt, Christine Adams, and Bill Paterson as well as Sidse Babett Knudsen, Óscar Jaenada, Hattie Hook, Enzo Cilenti and Julian Rhind-Tutt.

Filming began in 2025. Filming locations include Bilbao, Lisbon, London and Swansea.

== Release ==
Kill Jackie premiered all eight episodes on Amazon Prime Video in the United Kingdom, Ireland, Netherlands, Turkey, Germany, Austria, Switzerland, Liechtenstein, Luxembourg and Canada on 2 October 2026.

In the United States, the series was acquired by AMC+. It premiered on 2 October 2026.

In Italy, the series was acquired by Sky Italia and will premiere in late 2026.

The series was acquired by Warner Bros. Discovery for HBO Max in Spain, Portugal, Sweden, Denmark, Norway, Finland, Iceland, France and Belgium and will premiere in late 2026.

In Australia, the series was acquired by Stan and premiered on 2 October, 2026.
