= The Colour Room =

2021 British biographical film of Clarice Cliff

- Official poster
- Directed by: Claire McCarthy
- Written by: Claire Peate
- Produced by: Thembisa Cochrane; Georgie Paget
- Starring: Phoebe Dynevor; Matthew Goode; Kerry Fox; David Morrissey; Darci Shaw; Luke Norris
- Music by: Nitin Sawhney
- Production company: Caspian Films
- Distributed by: Sky Cinema
- Release date: 12 November 2021
- Running time: 112 minutes
- Country: United Kingdom
- Language: English

The Colour Room is a 2021 British biographical drama film directed by Claire McCarthy and written by Claire Peate. The film stars Phoebe Dynevor – in her feature film debut, Matthew Goode, David Morrissey, Darci Shaw, Kerry Fox and Luke Norris. It is based on the life of 1920s/30s ceramic artist Clarice Cliff. It received positive reviews from critics.

== Synopsis ==
Despite resistance, Clarice Cliff persisted in suggesting her ideas while working on the factory floor in potteries. Instead of mastering one skill to improve her earnings, she started one apprenticeship as an enameller, and then another as a lithographer at another factory to learn different aspects of production. Although supporting her widowed mother and her sister, she risked destitution by changing jobs so often. All of the potteries still had Victorian perceptions of what women wanted in terms of design. Cliff then got a job at another pottery as an apprentice modeller, a role rarely taken by a woman, and became apprenticed to designer Fred Ridgeway. The factory owner, Colley Shorter, appreciated her talent. Because of the 1926 general strike, there was not enough material to make new ceramics. Cliff knew that there was a huge stock of undecorated sub-standard ceramics held in the pottery. She covered up the imperfections on them with bright Art Deco-style patterns, thereby creating her Bizarre range. The sceptical head salesman for the pottery took the ceramics to a shop in Oxford because it had a female buyer. The shop bought the entire stock. Shorter and Cliff subsequently carried out marketing aimed at women, with celebrity endorsements to make the range fashionable. During the Great Depression, the factory survived because of sales of pottery carrying Cliff's designs. She embarked on an affair with Shorter, and eventually they married after his wife's death in 1940.

== Cast ==
- Phoebe Dynevor as Clarice Cliff
- Matthew Goode as Colley Shorter
- Kerry Fox as Ann Cliff
- Darci Shaw as Dot Cliff
- Luke Norris as Guy Shorter
- Bronwyn James as Betty
- Rachel Shenton as Annie Shorter
- Doreene Blackstock as Vera
- Tony Pitts as Jack Walker
- Bill Paterson as Gordon Forsythe
- Adrian Rawlins as John
- David Morrissey as Fred Ridgeway
- Oliver Huntingdon as Reg

== Production ==
The film was developed by Caspian Films, Sky Cinema, and Creative England with Thembisa Cochrane and Georgie Paget producing and Neil Jones co-producing. Laura Grange of Sky, Paul Ashton of Creative England, and David Gilbery, Charlie Dorfman, and Marlon Vogelgesang of Media Finance Capital are executive producing. It is directed by Claire McCarthy and written by Claire Peate.

It was announced in March 2021 that Phoebe Dynevor would play Cliff with Matthew Goode starring alongside her as Colley Shorter. Also cast were Kerry Fox, David Morrissey, Darci Shaw, and Luke Norris.

Principal photography took place on location in Stoke-on-Trent, Birmingham and The Black Country. Local papers reported crew at the Gladstone Pottery Museum in Longton.

== Release ==
A screening was held in London on 28 October 2021. The film premiered on Sky Cinema and in cinemas on 12 November 2021.

== Critical reception ==
A review of the film in The Guardian described it as an "entertaining feelgood period drama, a bright and upbeat film that perhaps comes over as just a bit strenuously cheerful in places" and noted that Dynevor "brings a breezy mischief and stubborn defiance to Clarice," but considered that "the film-makers have softened the edges too much, not wanting to risk making us feel bad or uncomfortable."

On the review aggregator website Rotten Tomatoes, 100% of 7 critics' reviews are positive, with an average rating of 6.7/10.
