= Ten Pound Poms (TV series) =

British historical drama television series

- Stan promotional poster
- Genre: Historical drama
- Created by: Danny Brocklehurst
- Written by: Danny Brocklehurst; Ryan Griffen; Smita Bhide; Ava Pickett
- Directed by: Ana Kokkinos; Jamie Magnus Stone; Tom McKay
- Starring: Michelle Keegan; Faye Marsay; Warren Brown; Stephen Curry; David Field
- Composer: Jack Thorburn Matthias
- Countries of origin: United Kingdom; Australia
- Original language: English
- No. of series: 2
- No. of episodes: 12

Production
- Executive producers: Danny Brocklehurst; Joel Wilson; Jamie Campbell; Olivia Trench; Tommy Bulfin; Amanda Duthie; Cailah Scobie
- Production location: Australia
- Production companies: Eleven Film; Sony Pictures Television

Original release
- Network: BBC One (United Kingdom); Stan (Australia)
- Release: 14 May 2023 – 13 April 2025

Ten Pound Poms is an Australian-British historical drama television series created by Danny Brocklehurst for BBC One and Stan. The series stars Michelle Keegan, Faye Marsay and Warren Brown as Ten Pound Poms, British citizens who migrated to Australia after the Second World War in a subsidised migration scheme. The series premiered on 14 May 2023 on BBC One and Stan, with six episodes in the first season. The first episode attracted an overnight audience of 4.6 million viewers. The second and final series was released on 9 March 2025. The series was cancelled after two series.

== Premise ==
The story follows a group of Britons, often then referred to as Poms in Australia and New Zealand, departing post-war Britain in 1956 for Australia, having been promised a better house, better job prospects, and a better quality of life for just £10 (equivalent to £260.58 in 2025). The group soon learn that life in Australia is not as promised. Struggling with their new identity as immigrants, the series follows their triumphs and pitfalls as they adapt to life in a new country far from Britain and familiarity.

== Cast and characters ==
=== Main ===
- Michelle Keegan as Kate Thorne
- Warren Brown as Terry Roberts
- Faye Marsay as Annie Roberts
- Rob Collins as Ron Mohoney
- David Field as Dean Spender
- Stephen Curry as JJ Walker
- Leon Ford as Bill Anderson
- Emma Hamilton as Sheila Anderson
- Hugo Johnstone-Burt as Henry Broad
- Hattie Hook as Pattie Roberts
- Finn Treacy as Peter Roberts
- Nic English as Robbie Carter
- Nikki Shiels as Fran Robinson

=== Recurring ===
- Declan Coyle as Stevie Cartwright
- Travis McMahon as Ivan Cartwright
- David Field as Dean Spender
- Johnny Nasser as Bob Travers
- Penny Day as Sandra
- Toni Scanlan as Margie Thorne
- Trisha Morton-Thomas as Auntie May
- Cheree Cassidy as Marlene Chase
- Berynn Schwerdt as Arty Farthington
- Alastair Bradman as Michael Thorne
- Paiton Kwok as Birrani
- Waangenga Blanco as Yarran
- Sarah Furnari as Maria
- Miah Curran and Neve Curran as Elizabeth and Margaret Anderson
- Rose Chachko as Kylie
- Libby Fleming as Veronika Müller
- Alex Andreas as Nick
- Tara Morice as Ward Sister Mulligan
- Tina Bursill as Mrs Walker

=== Guests ===
- Bruce Spence as Father
- Jon Sivewright as Keith Buddin
- Luke Ford as Clive
- Michael Beckley as Head teacher
- Nicholas Hope as Stanley

== Episodes ==
=== Series overview ===
Series	Episodes	Originally released	
Series	Episodes	First released	Last released
1	6	14 May 2023	18 June 2023
2	6	9 March 2025	13 April 2025

=== Series 1 (2023) ===
No. overall	No. in series	Title	Directed by	Written by	Original release date	U.K. viewers (millions)
1	1	"Episode 1"	Jamie Magnus-Stone	Danny Brocklehurst	14 May 2023	6.35
In dreary postwar Manchester, Annie Roberts is at her wits' end when husband Terry spends all his wages down the pub. Desperate for a better life for her children, Annie responds to an emigration advert that promises Brits a prosperous new life in Australia for a tenner. Expecting whitewashed houses and sun-soaked adventures, the Roberts family arrive in Sydney to find life down under isn’t quite what they’ve been sold.
2	2	"Episode 2"	Jamie Magnus-Stone	Danny Brocklehurst	21 May 2023	4.90
A haunted Terry retraces his steps from the night before. Reassured that all is okay, he returns to his boisterous family. Meanwhile, Kate gets a lead on Michael’s whereabouts, and her next-door neighbour Bill goes to extreme lengths to get himself a bit of extra cash.
3	3	"Episode 3"	Jamie Magnus-Stone	Ryan Griffen	28 May 2023	4.46
Annie is furious when Terry stays out all night. To give him a taste of his own medicine, Annie leaves Terry home alone with the kids and bonds with Kate on a cross-country road trip. With their mum miles away and their dad preoccupied with his demons, Peter and Pattie run wild.
4	4	"Episode 4"	Ana Kokkinos	Smita Bhide	4 June 2023	4.19
Annie invites Terry to Marlene’s party in the hope that they can let their hair down. But seeing a carefree and integrated Annie only makes Terry feel like more of an outsider, and his PTSD spirals. With her parents out all night, Pattie tries to confront her problems head-on and ends up in a dangerous situation.
5	5	"Episode 5"	Ana Kokkinos	Ava Pickett	11 June 2023	4.33
Terry is forced to confide in Arty and Ron over a business venture. Annie ignores their problems by accepting an invitation from Nick. Back at the hostel, Stevie convinces Pattie to spend the day with him, and Kate leaves her hut behind in pursuit of a suburban address. With everyone preoccupied, Peter gets forgotten.
6	6	"Episode 6"	Ana Kokkinos	Danny Brocklehurst	18 June 2023	4.52
Annie is compelled to make a stand for migrants and stages a peaceful protest, but things get quickly out of hand, and Pattie is badly hurt. Kate returns amidst the carnage to find a surprise visitor waiting, and Sheila’s desperation spirals.

=== Series 2 (2025) ===
No. overall	No. in series	Title	Directed by	Written by	Original release date	U.K. viewers (millions)
7	1	"Episode 1"	Ana Kokkinos	Danny Brocklehurst	9 March 2025	N/A
8	2	"Episode 2"	Ana Kokkinos	Danny Brocklehurst	16 March 2025	N/A
9	3	"Episode 3"	Ana Kokkinos	Danny Brocklehurst & Smita Bhide	23 March 2025	N/A
10	4	"Episode 4"	Tom McKay	Danny Brocklehurst & Ryan Griffen	30 March 2025	N/A
11	5	"Episode 5"	Tom McKay	Danny Brocklehurst	6 April 2025	N/A
12	6	"Episode 6"	Tom McKay	Danny Brocklehurst	13 April 2025	N/A

== Production ==
=== Development ===
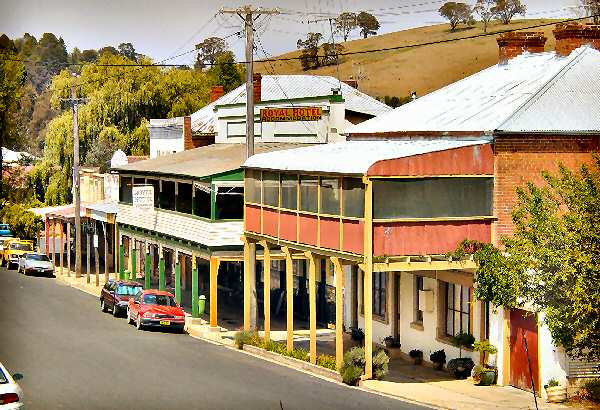
Carcoar in central New South Wales stood in as the fictional Corburn

In May 2022, the BBC announced that Ten Pound Poms had been commissioned by Piers Wenger, Director of BBC Drama. The show is a co-production between BBC and Stan, produced by Eleven and distributed by Sony Pictures Television for BBC One and BBC iPlayer in the UK and Stan in Australia. On 2 October 2025, it was revealed that the series was cancelled after two series.

=== Casting ===
The cast were confirmed in June 2022. Michelle Keegan, Faye Marsay and Warren Brown lead the cast alongside Australian actors Rob Collins, Leon Ford, Declan Coyle, David Field, Stephen Curry, Hattie Hook, Finn Treacy and Emma Hamilton.

=== Filming ===
Filming for the first series began in Australia in May 2022, taking place primarily in Scheyville National Park and Carcoar, with additional scenes in Sydney and Luton Hoo, Bedfordshire. Filming for the second season was reported to be underway as of April 2024.

== Release and reception ==
The series premiered on 14 May 2023 on BBC One and has six episodes. All episodes were made available on BBC iPlayer and Stan on the same date. One episode a week was broadcast on BBC One, each Sunday evening following the initial premiere.

The second series was released on Sunday 9 March 2025.

=== Ratings ===
Episode 1 attracted an overnight audience of 4.6 million, making Ten Pound Poms the most viewed BBC drama premiere since Vigil in 2021. It had a 34% viewership share at 21:00, making it the highest performing title of the day.

Series one of Ten Pound Poms was one of the UK’s biggest new dramas of 2023, launching to a 28-day figure of 7.7 million viewers.

=== Critical response ===
The series has received generally positive reviews. Anita Singh, reviewing for The Telegraph, described the series as a "solidly enjoyable Sunday night drama" in which writer Danny Brocklehurst "weaves his plots and characters with confidence". She awarded the series four stars.

Morgan Cormack from Radio Times called the series "an intriguing period piece that will definitely teach viewers a thing or two" and added that although the stories were written "so convincingly...you only hope they could have had the breathing room to be contemplated more". Cormack praised performances by Marsay and Brown, ultimately giving the series three stars.

Alex Moreland for National World awarded the show three stars too, while praising Marsay and Brown's performances, and commenting that the series "ultimately...makes for a strong addition to the Sunday night drama slot." They added that the series has "an engaging premise...brought to life by talented actors and a capable script."

The Guardian journalist Rebecca Nicholson also gave the series three stars, adding it was "nicely compelling, and a real education for those not familiar with the Ten Pound Poms story"; however, they criticised the series' overly broad approach tackling issues such as racism and sexism.

Camilla Long, in a TV round-up for The Times, described the series as a cross between Hi-de-Hi! and Crocodile Dundee, adding that it was "a hilariously watchable drama in which no Australian cliché was left unturned."

Dan Einav, in their two star review for Financial Times, criticised "laboured subplots", and noted that although the series has "some vaguely thrillerish stakes...ultimately Ten Pound Poms leaves the viewer feeling short-changed."

NME described the series as "an eye-opener", ranking it 10th place on its 10 Best Australian TV shows of 2023 list.

== Awards and nominations ==
Year	Award	Subject	Nominee	Result	Ref.
2023	Golden Nymph Awards – Monte-Carlo Television Festival	Fiction – Best Series	Ten Pound Poms	Won	
2023	Golden Nymph Awards – Monte-Carlo Television Festival	Fiction – Best Actor	Warren Brown	Won	
2023	Australian Screen Sound Guild Awards	Best Sound for a Television Series	Ten Pound Poms	Nominated	
2024	AACTA Awards	Best Costume Design	Xanthe Heubel	Nominated	
