= Emerald Falls =

2008 television film

- Genre: Mystery thriller
- Written by: Tim Pye; Cathy Strickland
- Directed by: Peter Andrikidis
- Starring: Georgie Parker; Vince Colosimo; Geoff Morrell; Catherine McClements; Thom Green; Andrew McFarlane
- Country of origin: Australia
- Original language: English

Original release
- Release: 2008

Emerald Falls (also known as The Falls) is a 2008 television film starring Georgie Parker, Vince Colosimo, Geoff Morrell, Catherine McClements, and in his television debut, Thom Green. Shot in Sydney at Mount Wilga House in Hornsby with exterior shots taken in the Blue Mountains, Emerald Falls was filmed in 2007. It was written by Tim Pye and Cathy Strickland, and directed by Peter Andrikidis.

== Plot ==
The recently divorced Joni Ferguson (Parker) and her 15-year-old son Zac (Green) relocate to the Blue Mountains, where Joni has bought a run-down house and decides to open a bed and breakfast. Six months on, the local doctor (McFarlane) is found dead in his home, and the police, along with precocious Zac, try to find out what happened to him. When the police start to question Joni about the murder, Zac tries to clear her name.

== Cast ==
- Joni Ferguson – Georgie Parker
- Zac Ferguson – Thom Green (listed as Tom Green in the movie credits)
- Ned Montoya – Vince Colosimo
- Jack Donnelly – Geoff Morrell
- Rosalie Bailey – Catherine McClements
- Blossom Piggot – Ella Scott Lynch
- Steve Landers – Oliver Ackland
- Dr. Henry Forbes – Andrew McFarlane
- Callum Peterson – Leon Ford
- Catherine Reid – Heather Mitchell
- Paul Ferguson – Rhys Muldoon
