= Christopher Schaap =

American actor, director and writer (born 1991)

- Born: October 30, 1991 (age 34); Glendora, California, U.S.
- Education: Seattle University
- Occupations: Actor, director, writer
- Years active: 2014-present
- Known for: Prom King, 2010

Christopher Schaap (born October 30, 1991) is an American actor, director and writer.

== Biography ==
Schaap was born in Glendora, California and raised in Seattle, Washington. He graduated from Seattle University. Schaap's debut feature film, Prom King, 2010, has been shown at Frameline Film Festival in San Francisco, Outshine Film Festival in Miami, TLVFest in Tel Aviv, InsideOut Toronto LGBT Film Festival Outfest in Los Angeles and Seattle International Film Festival. The film won Schaap a "New Vision Award" at San Jose's Cinequest 2017 Film Festival.

== Filmography ==
Year	Title	Roles	Notes
2019	Lavender	Actor, Set Dresser	Short film
2017	Prom King, 2010	Writer, Director, Lead Actor	Feature film
2014	Out of Print	Producer, Writer	

== Awards ==
Year	Festival	Film	Awards	Notes
2017	Iris Prize	Prom King, 2010	Best Feature	
2017	Rhode Island International Film Festival	Prom King, 2010	Alternative Spirit Award: Grand Prize	
2017	Cinequest Film Festival	Prom King, 2010	New Vision Award	
2014	National Film Festival for Talented Youth	Out of Print	Audience Choice Award	
