= Young Hearts (2024 film) =

2024 coming-of-age film

- Festival release poster
- Directed by: Anthony Schatteman
- Written by: Anthony Schatteman
- Produced by: Xavier Rombaut; Floor Onrust; Annabella Nezri
- Starring: Lou Goossens; Marius De Saeger
- Cinematography: Pieter Van Campe
- Edited by: Emiel Nuninga
- Music by: Ruben De Gheselle
- Production companies: Polar Bear; Family Affair Films; Kwassa Films
- Distributed by: Films Boutique; Kinepolis Film Distribution
- Release dates: February 17, 2024 (Berlinale); December 18, 2024 (Belgium)
- Running time: 97 minutes
- Countries: Belgium; Netherlands
- Languages: Dutch; French

Young Hearts is a 2024 Belgian-Dutch independent coming-of-age drama film written and directed by Anthony Schatteman in his feature directorial debut. The film tells the story of Elias, a boy who falls in love with his new neighbour, a boy of the same age named Alexander.

The Belgian-Dutch co-production was selected in the Generation Kplus section at the 74th Berlin International Film Festival, where it had its world premiere on February 17, 2024 and competed for Crystal Bear for the Best Film.

== Synopsis ==
Elias, a boy from the Belgian countryside, forms a friendship with his new neighbor, Alexander, a confident and headstrong boy from Brussels. As the two grow closer, Alexander reveals that he was in love with a boy and asks Elias if he has experienced true love, a question that lingers in his mind.

For the first time, Elias begins to understand the depth of his feelings as he starts to fall in love with Alexander. However, overwhelmed by fear of judgment and rejection, Elias denies his emotions, distancing himself from his friends, family, and Alexander to hide his truth. Consumed by loneliness and regret, Elias struggles with the weight of his decisions.

A heartfelt conversation with his grandfather, who shares a story of his enduring love for his late wife, inspires Elias to confront his fears. Realizing that love is too precious to let slip away, he gathers the courage to reconcile with Alexander, taking a brave step toward embracing his feelings and the possibility of love.

== Cast ==
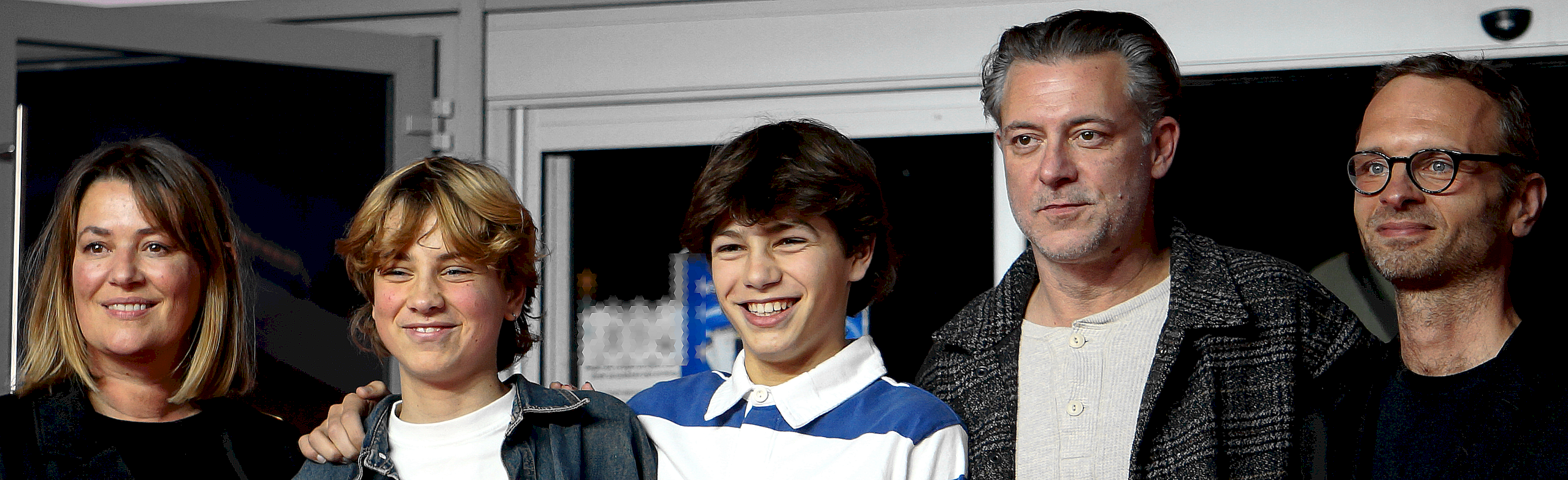

- Lou Goossens as Elias Montero
- Marius De Saeger as Alexander
- Geert Van Rampelberg as Luk Montero, Elias' father
- Emilie De Roo as Nathalie, Elias' mother
- Dirk Van Dijck as Fred, Elias' grandfather
- Saar Rogiers as Valerie, Alexander's friend and Elias' girlfriend/friend
- Jul Goossens as Maxime, Elias' older brother
- Ezra Van Dongen as Line, Maxime's girlfriend
- Wim Opbrouck as Uncle Tony, Alexander's uncle
- Florence Hebbelynck as Aunt Pia, Alexander's aunt
- Olivier Englebert as Marc, Alexander's father
- Olga De Saeger as Ella, Alexander's younger sister
- LaDiva Live as La Diva, a drag queen in Brussels
- Bert Dobbelaere as Professor Van Daelle, the school's French teacher
- Jill Malfroot as Lukas, one of Elias' classmates
- Cassie Alcendor as Lize, one of Elias' classmates
- Samba Thiam as Matteo, one of Elias' classmates
- Sam Michiels as Mieke, one of Elias' classmates
- Marie Gevaert as Lore, one of Elias' classmates
- Stephen Harrisson as the school's Physical Education teacher
- Johan Hallet as a street photographer who takes an instant picture of Elias and Alexander together during their trip to Brussels

Ester Dekoning, Hadassa Dekoning and Frank Bracquené play members of Luk Montero's band.

Staf De Neve, Briek Goorman, Olivier Debaere and Denise Bogers play a group of older school bullies who chase Elias and Alexander after Alexander knocks down their bicycles having previously been insulted.

== Production ==
Young Hearts is the debut directing feature film for Anthony Schatteman featuring Lou Goossens and Marius De Saeger in the main roles, with Geert Van Rampelberg, Emilie De Roo, and Dirk Van Dyck playing pivotal supporting roles. The film is produced by Polar Bear, in co-production with the Belgian Kwassa Films and the Dutch Family Affair Films.

The development of the film began in 2019 and spanned four years. Production of the film was first announced by Anthony Schatteman in a Facebook post on May 31, 2022. The production team spent six months scouting suitable filming locations. Open casting calls began on September 20, 2022, focusing on filling the main roles with boys aged 11 to 18. Director Anthony Schatteman, alongside his best friend and the film's Children's Coach, Oliver Roels, reviewed over 1,500 auditions. Marius De Saeger was the first actor cast, as his personality and personal life closely aligned with the character of Alexander. Lou Goossens was later selected for the role of Elias, chosen for his natural connection with De Saeger and the parallels between his personal life and that of the character.

During an interview with Amelia Stevenson for TresA Magazine on August 22, 2025, Goossens detailed the complex challenges he undertook to develop Elias' personality and intense inner struggles.

Filming commenced in August 2023 and was completed over a span of 28 days.

== Music ==
Ruben De Gheselle was hired to score the film. Young Hearts was his feature film debut. Ruben De Gheselle's original score for Young Hearts was released by MovieScore Media on December 18, 2024.

=== Track listing ===
All music is composed by Ruben De Gheselle, except where noted.

Young Hearts (Original Motion Picture Soundtrack)
No.	Title	Length
1.	"Elias"	1:13
2.	"The Fields"	1:04
3.	"Grandfather"	2:18
4.	"The Farmhouse"	1:11
5.	"The Abandoned Castle"	2:37
6.	"Elias Plays"	1:01
7.	"Valerie"	2:21
8.	"Running Away"	2:46
9.	"The Train"	1:00
10.	"The Ardennes"	2:06
11.	"The Lake"	1:35
12.	"Finally Together"	2:29
13.	"Friends"	1:12
14.	"Goodbye"	0:56
15.	"Compass" (Christian Sewald)	1:34
16.	"A First Love"	1:29
Total length:		24:52

== Release ==
=== Theatrical ===
Young Hearts had its world premiere on February 17, 2024, as part of the 74th Berlin International Film Festival, in Generation Kplus. It was also screened at the 50th Seattle International Film Festival in May 2024 and the 77th Cannes Film Festival in Cannes Écrans Juniors section on May 22, 2024. It had its Canadian premiere at the Inside Out Film and Video Festival on May 28, 2024 in Centrepiece Gala.

It also featured in the International Competition of Feature Films in the junior category on June 2, 2024 in the 64th edition of the Zlín Film Festival, also known as the International Film Festival for Children and Youth held in the Czech Republic. The film competed for Iris Prize Best Feature Award in Iris Prize and was screened on October 10, 2024.

The film was released in Belgian cinemas on December 18, 2024 by Kinepolis Film Distribution. The film was released in Dutch cinemas on December 19, 2024. The film premiered in the United States on March 14, 2025 at the IFC Center in New York.

The film was released in Mexican cinemas on July 17, 2025 by Cine Caníbal.

=== Home media ===
The film was released on Blu-ray and DVD in Germany on March 28, 2025 and July 3, 2025 respectively. The Blu-ray release features a Dutch audio track as well as Dutch and French subtitles while the DVD release features Dutch, French and German audio tracks and German subtitles.

It was released on DVD in the US by Strand Releasing on May 13, 2025. It was released on DVD in France by Epicentre Films Editions on June 17, 2025. This release features a Dutch audio track and French subtitles. Bonus features include an interview with Anthony Schatteman and Xavier Rombaut, Schatteman's 2012 short film Kus me zachtjes (Kiss Me Softly), Schatteman's biography and the film's official trailer.

A Collector's Edition was released on Blu-ray and DVD in the UK by Peccadillo Pictures on November 17, 2025. This release features a Flemish audio track and English subtitles. Bonus features include a director's commentary, deleted scenes, interviews with Anthony Schatteman, Lou Goossens and Marius De Saeger and a fan art gallery.

== Reception ==
On the review aggregator website Rotten Tomatoes, 92% of 25 critics' reviews are positive. Metacritic, which uses a weighted average, assigned the film a score of 69 out of 100, based on 4 critics, indicating "generally favorable" reviews.

Aurore Engelen reviewing the film at Berlinale for Cineuropa wrote, "Young Hearts is an authentic coming-of-age tale which enriches the existing body of family films with a wonderful queer love story."

Catherine Bray writing in Variety praised Lou Goossens, for being "naturalistic and able to convey subtle shades of inner turmoil, despite his young age." Praising director Anthony Schatteman for his direction wrote, "his direction feels calm and quietly confident in ways that is not always the case with a debut." Concluding her review she opined, "Young Hearts, while gentler and less obviously tear-jerking, benefits from a sincere and lived-in emotional honesty which serves its aims well."

Beatrice Loayza, writing in The New York Times wrote "Young Hearts is a more wholesome, and ultimately more cliché, endeavor. In the end, teenage brooding gives way to a sparkling fairy tale finale that shows that there was nothing for Elias to worry about, after all."

Sam Wachman, writing for Bright Lights Film Journal, wrote that Schatteman "allows Elias and Alexander to transcend the usual tropes and achieve complete, joyous humanity." He criticized one scene involving a drag queen's performance, writing that "Young Hearts is not the story of Elias's induction into a greater queer culture; it is the story of his love for Alexander." Ultimately, he praised Goossens' acting, writing "...Even when the story strikes a wrong note or takes a turn for the maudlin, Goossens rescues Young Hearts from itself with his stellar, precocious lead performance."

Gary M. Kramer, reviewing the film for Gay City News, lavished praise on the performances of Goossens and De Saeger, writing, "Goossens carries the film, effortlessly, and he is well matched by De Saeger, who is appropriately more relaxed and comfortable in his own skin as Alexander. De Saeger's responses to Elias' discomfort are real, and it creates a real investment for viewers to want the boys to end up together."

Diego Semerene, of Slant Magazine, awarded the film 3 out 4 stars, writing, "Tenderly observed, writer-director Anthony Schatteman's film offers the rare opportunity to indulge in a fantasy where the risks of queer love going public are anodyne, even negligible, while also leaving room for a casual critique of what we could perhaps call Nordic parenting, where children enjoy so much autonomy but are also left to their own devices."

Robert Daniels of RogerEbert.com also gave the film 3 out of 4 stars and praised Schatteman's direction, writing, "Schattenman trusts his young leads, often allowing his gentle lens to linger on their faces as new thoughts, feelings, and passions bubble to the surface."

G. Allen Johnson, writing in the San Francisco Chronicle, gave the film 3 out of 4 stars and praised the performance of Goossens as "astonishingly subtle". Writing about the film, he said, "'Young Hearts' is a film that doesn't traffic in big plot twists or dramatic reveals. It's a film that treasures fragile thoughts and feelings, rare in a film these days."

Danny King, reviewing the film for the British Film Institute, found that Elias and Alexander's "too-idyllic scenes together encapsulate both the charms and the limitations of Young Hearts – a movie about the startling power of first love that itself generates few surprises".

== Accolades ==
The film was selected in Generation Kplus at the 74th Berlin International Film Festival, thus it was nominated to compete for the Crystal Bear.

Award	Date	Category	Recipient	Result	Ref.
Berlin International Film Festival	February 25, 2024	Children's Jury Generation Kplus:Special Mention	Young Hearts	Won	
Berlin International Film Festival	February 25, 2024	Teddy Award for Best Feature Film	Young Hearts	Nominated	
Freiburg Gay Film Festival	May 8, 2024	2024 Audience Award	Young Hearts	Won	
Seattle International Film Festival	May 19, 2024	SIFF 2024 New Directors Competition: Special Jury Mention	Anthony Schatteman	Won	
Seattle International Film Festival	May 19, 2024	SIFF 2024 Futurewave Feature	Young Hearts	Nominated	
Cannes Film Festival	May 24, 2024	Cannes Écrans Juniors Award for Middle Schoolers	Young Hearts	Won	
Inside Out Film and Video Festival	June 1, 2024	Outstanding Performance	Lou Goossens	Won	
Zlín Film Festival	June 5, 2024	Golden Slippers Award for Best Feature Film for Teenagers	Young Hearts	Won	
Zlín Film Festival	June 5, 2024	Golden Apple Award for Audience's Choice	Young Hearts	Won	
Connecticut LGBTQ Film Festival	July 3, 2024	Director's Award	Anthony Schatteman	Won	
Les Ciné-Rencontres de Prades Festival	July 25, 2024	The Sólveig Anspach Audience Award	Young Hearts	Won	
Long Beach QFilm Festival	September 12, 2024	Best Feature	Young Hearts	Won	
Long Beach QFilm Festival	September 12, 2024	Best Performance	Lou Goossens	Won	
FilmOut San Diego	September 26, 2024	Best International Feature	Young Hearts	Won	
FilmOut San Diego	September 26, 2024	Outstanding Emerging Talent	Lou Goossens	Won	
Oslo/Fusion International Film Festival	September 30, 2024	Best Narrative Feature	Young Hearts	Won	
Out on Film	October 7, 2024	Jury Award Best Narrative Feature	Young Hearts	Won	
Out on Film	October 7, 2024	Jury Award Best First Feature	Young Hearts	Won	
Out on Film	October 7, 2024	Audience Award Best Feature	Young Hearts	Nominated	
Out on Film	October 7, 2024	Audience Award Best Feature Runner-Up	Young Hearts	Won	
OUT at the Movies International Film Festival	October 9, 2024	Audience Award Winner for Best Narrative Feature	Young Hearts	Won	
OUT at the Movies International Film Festival	October 9, 2024	Jury Award Winner for Best Narrative Feature	Young Hearts	Won	
OUT at the Movies International Film Festival	October 9, 2024	Jury Award Winner for Best Performance in a Leading Role	Lou Goossens	Won	
Junges Film Festival Köln/Cinepänz	October 12, 2024	Teen Jury for Best Film	Young Hearts	Won	
Iris Prize	October 19, 2024	Iris Prize Best Feature Award	Young Hearts	Won	
Iris Prize	October 19, 2024	Best Performance in a Male Role	Lou Goossens	Won	
Reeling: The Chicago LGBTQ+ International Film Festival	October 22, 2024	Jury Award for Best Narrative Feature	Young Hearts	Nominated	
Reeling: The Chicago LGBTQ+ International Film Festival	October 22, 2024	Audience Award for Best Narrative Feature	Young Hearts	Won	
New York Lesbian, Gay, Bisexual, & Transgender Film Festival	October 25, 2024	Best International Feature	Young Hearts	Nominated	
New York Lesbian, Gay, Bisexual, & Transgender Film Festival	October 25, 2024	Performance Special Mention	Lou Goossens	Won	
Montclair Film Festival	October 27, 2024	Audience Awards World Cinema	Young Hearts	Won	
Ale Kino! International Young Audience Film Festival	December 2, 2024	ECFA Award for the Best Feature-Length Film for Children	Young Hearts	Won	
Magritte Awards	February 22, 2025	Most Promising Actor	Lou Goossens	Nominated	
Magritte Awards	February 22, 2025	Best Flemish Film	Young Hearts	Nominated	
Luxembourg City Film Festival	March 16, 2025	Special Mention	Young Hearts	Won	
World Soundtrack Awards	October 15, 2025	Belgian Film Composer of the Year	Ruben De Gheselle	Won	
