= Lou Goossens =

Belgian child actor

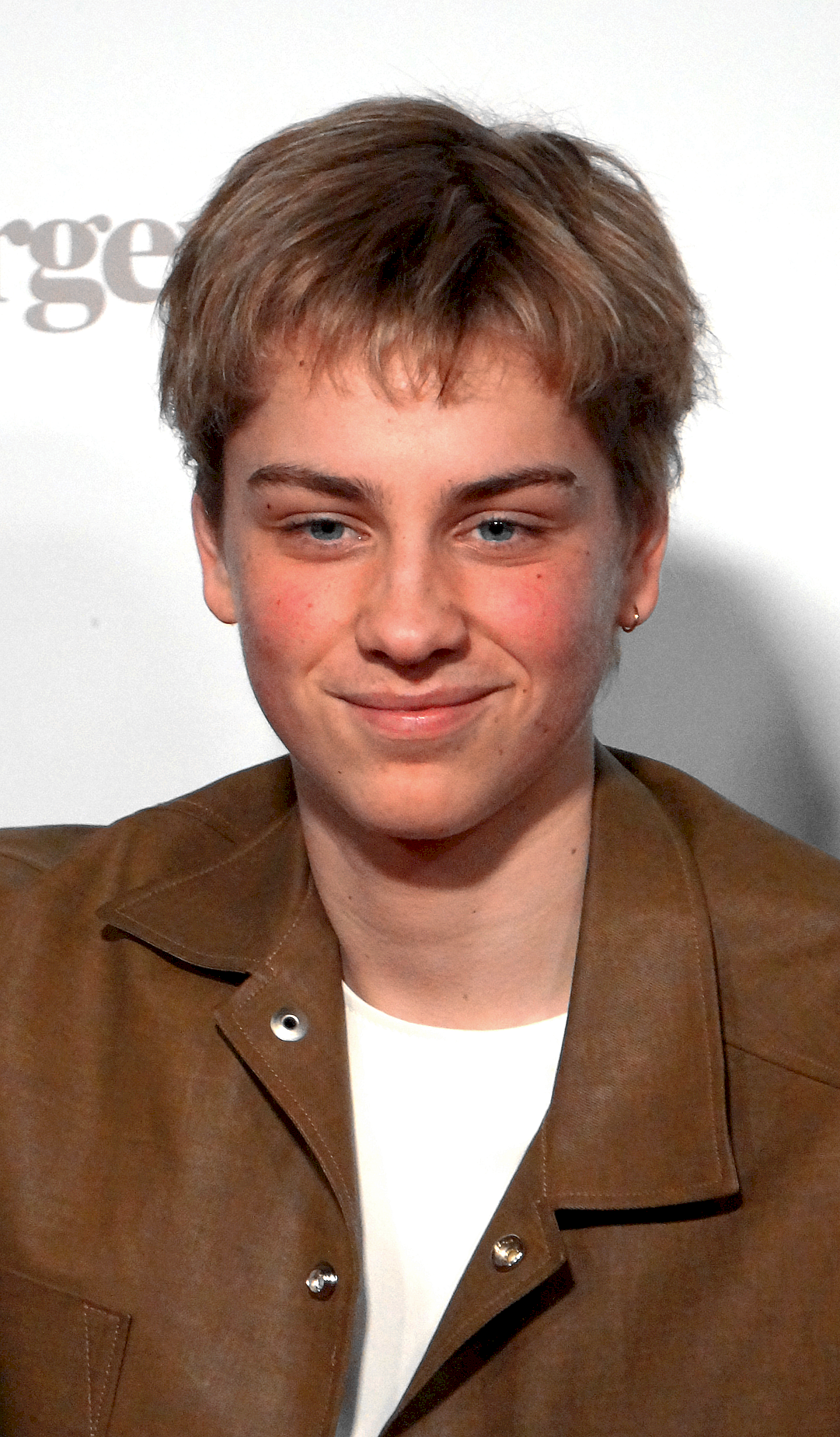
- Lou Goossens in 2026
- Born: 2009 (age 16–17); Opdorp, East Flanders, Belgium
- Years active: 2021–present
- Notable work: Young Hearts

Lou Goossens (born 2009) is a Belgian child actor. He is known primarily for his leading role in the coming-of-age drama film Young Hearts, written and directed by Anthony Schatteman.

== Life ==
Goossens made his acting debut at 13 in the Dutch-language short film Alleen Ik (Only me, me alone) as Flor. In 2023 he also played a small role as Dennis in the series Boomer

At 14, he played Elias Montero in the 2024 coming-of-age drama film Young Hearts.

Young Hearts was selected in the Generation Kplus section at the 74th Berlin International Film Festival, where it had its world premiere on 17 February and competed for the Crystal Bear for the Best Film.

In same year he also played in the TV series Moresnet as Young Ben Schotz.

In 2025 he had two small roles as Benjamin in the TV series Holly Sh!t! and young Horst in movie "Zondag De Negenste" as well as a main role in a short film called Shutterspeed for which he won award for Best Acting Performance in the Flemish Competition.

In 2026 he guest starred in the series Patience and played Frans Putseys in TV series Breendonk. In summer of 2026 he starred in next TV series Dochters by Anthony Schatteman that will have premiere next year.

Goossens will play Milo Verhaeghe, a mysterious boy who spends his days recording the world through an old camcorder, in the movie The Silverwood Academy that will premiere in 2028.

== Filmography ==
Key
†	Denotes films that have not yet been released

=== Film ===
Year	Title	Role	Notes
2022	Alleen Ik (Only me, me alone)	Flor	Debut short film by Jasper De Maeseneer
2024	Young Hearts	Elias Montero	Debut feature film by Anthony Schatteman
2025	Shutterspeed	Cas	Short film by Jasper De Maeseneer
2025	Sunday Ninth	12-year-old Horst	Feature film by Kat Steppe
2028	The Silverwood Academy	Milo Verhaeghe	Feature film

=== Television ===
Year of release	Title	Role	Notes
2023	Boomer	Dennis	Debut TV series
2024	Moresnet	Young Ben Schotz	TV series
2025	Holy Sh!t	Benjamin	TV series
2026	Patience	Teenager	Guest appearance in S. 2 EP. 7
2026	Breendonk	Frans Putseys	TV series
2027	Dochters	not known yet	TV series

== Awards and nominations ==
Year	Award	Category	Nominated work	Result	Ref.
2024	New York Lesbian, Gay, Bisexual, & Transgender Film Festival	Special Mention	Young Hearts	Won	
2024	FilmOut San Diego	Outstanding Emerging Talent	Young Hearts	Won	
2024	Inside Out Film and Video Festival	Outstanding Performance	Young Hearts	Won	
2024	Long Beach QFilm Festival	Best Performance	Young Hearts	Won	
2024	OUT at the Movies International Film Festival	Jury Award Winner for Best Performance in a Leading Role	Young Hearts	Won	
2024	Iris Prize	Best Performance in a Male Role	Young Hearts	Won	
2025	Magritte Awards	Most Promising Actor	Young Hearts	Nominated	
2025	Leuven International Short Film Festival	Best Acting Performance	Shutterspeed	Won	
2026	Ensor Award	Best Acting Performance Lead Role - Film	Young Hearts	Nominated	
