= August (2011 film) =

- Film poster
- Directed by: Eldar Rapaport
- Written by: Eldar Rapaport
- Starring: Murray Bartlett; Daniel Dugan; Adrian Gonzales
- Release date: June 9, 2011
- Running time: 99 minutes
- Country: United States
- Languages: English; Spanish

August is an LGBT American drama film, released in 2011. The full length directorial debut of Eldar Rapaport, the film stars Murray Bartlett as Troy, a man returning to Los Angeles five years after abandoning his long-term relationship with Jonathan (Daniel Dugan) to move to Spain. His return, however, poses problems for Jonathan, whose unresolved feelings and continued attraction to Troy threaten his relationship with his current partner Raul (Adrian Gonzalez).

The film is an expansion of Rapaport's 2005 short film Postmortem, which also starred Bartlett and Dugan.

== Cast ==
- Murray Bartlett as Troy
- Edward Conna as Firm Director (as Eddie Conna)
- Adrian Gonzalez as Raul
- Daniel Dugan as Jonathan
- Kevin McShane as Radio DJ / TV Skit
- Hank Ignacio as Baby
- Bernhard Forcher as Sean
- Maria Chung as Lynn
- Brad Standley as Devin
- Tyler Lee as Straight Couple Husband
- Angelica Lee as Straight Couple Wife
- Massimo Quagliano as Pick Up Guy 1
- Hillary Banks as Nina
- Brenda Lanie as Deli Cashier
- Amy Clites as Lisa / TV Skit / Radio DJ 2
- Brian Sloan as TV news
- Todd Gaebe as Gallery Waiter
- Samantha Manalang as Gallery Waitress
- Scott Romstadt as Pick Up Guy 2
- David LeBarron as Bob
- Tod Macofsky as Ken (as Tod H. Macofsky)
- Mike Vaughn as Nick
- Matt Chaney as Beach Boy 1
- Adam Neely as Beach Boy 2
- Richard Ettley as Repair Man
- Austin Musick as Bistro Hostess
- Matthew Manalang as Bistro Waiters
- Narineh Hacopian as Bistro Waiters
- Jamie Papish as Band Players
- Eduardo J. Torres as Band Players
- David Ben-Ami as Band Players
- David Martinelli as Band Players
- Devon Farr as Belly Dancer
