= Fouad Hajji =

Belgian actor (born 1982)

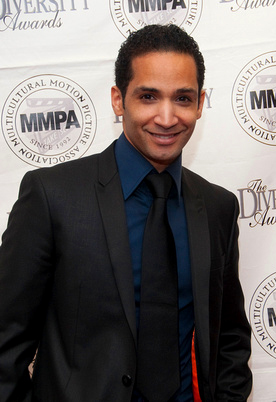
- Hajji at the 19thAnnual MMPA Oscar Week Luncheon and Awards in Beverly Hills, February 2012
- Born: 8 December 1982 (age 43); Vilvoorde, Belgium
- Occupation: Actor
- Years active: 2004–present
- Website: www.fouadhajji.com

Fouad Hajji (born 8 December 1982) is a Belgian actor. He is known for his guest appearances in various American television series, including NCIS: Los Angeles and Criminal Minds: Beyond Borders. He has also appeared in a number of independent films and short films, as well as worked as a dancer and stunt performer.

== Early life and education ==
Hajji was born in Vilvoorde, Belgium, to Moroccan immigrant parents. He is fluent in French, Arabic, Dutch and English. He studied breakdance and hip-hop and taught at several Belgian dance schools, including AS Dance, K-creation, Dasa, and Jazzmijn. He holds a bachelor's degree in information technology from Honim College and a master's degree in international business from Vlekho College in Brussels.

He later trained as an actor at the Parallax School of Actors and The Flanders Acting Studio, where he studied Method acting, the Meisner technique, and emotional preparation.

== Career ==
=== Dance and performance ===
In the early stages of his career, Hajji performed as a dancer and stunt artist. He appeared at the TMF Awards (Belgium) and collaborated with artists including Hadise, Sandrine Van Handenhoven, and RoxorLoops. He has also featured in music videos by Kamran & Hooman, Kate Ryan, and Sami Yusuf.

=== Acting ===
Hajji began appearing in short films and television series in the mid-2000s. In 2007, he played the role of Rachid in the short film Ou Quoi, directed by Cecilia Verheyden, which won Best Fiction Début at the International Short Film Festival Leuven. In 2011, he portrayed Javed in Odium, directed by Neale Hemrajani.

In 2010, Hajji signed with a U.S.-based talent agency and relocated to Los Angeles. He appeared in the feature film The Mummy Resurrected (2014) as Jafaar Atayeb, produced by Ray Haboush, and in False Colors (2016) as Ahmed, directed by William Norton.

He made his American network television debut in 2013 in the CBS crime drama NCIS: Los Angeles. In 2015, he guest-starred in Criminal Minds: Beyond Borders, appearing opposite Gary Sinise.

== Partial filmography ==
- Ou quoi (2007, Short) as Rachid
- Kidnap & Rescue (2011, TV Series) as Tariq
- The Faithful (2011, Short) as Alhasan
- Odium (2011, Short) as Javed
- Triggers: Weapons That Changed the World (2011-2012, TV Series documentary) as Rebel
- 1000 Ways To Die (2012, TV Series documentary) as Hadal
- Mike India Alpha (2013, Short) as Kinah
- NCIS: Los Angeles (2013, TV Series) as Shooter
- Deadly Wives (2014, TV Series) as Danny Attar
- The Mummy Resurrected (2014) as Jafaar Atayeb
- Waheed (2015, Short) as Sultan
- False Colors (2016) as Ahmed
- Criminal Minds: Beyond Borders (2016, TV Series) as Amajagh
- Madam Secretary (2017, TV Series) as Hassan Alsnany
- Animal Kingdom (2019, TV Series) as Clifton
- Magnum P.I. (2021, TV Series) as Dave/Lenny
- Rebel (2022) as Idriss
- BXL (2025) as Tarek
