= Thom Green =

Australian actor and dancer (born 1991)

- Born: 4 September 1991 (age 35); Australia
- Occupation: Actor
- Years active: 2007–present

Thom Green (born 4 September 1991) is an Australian actor and dancer who is best known for his role as Sammy in the ABC series Dance Academy, the lead role in Camp as Kip Wampler, and as Thomas Lasky in the Halo 4: Forward Unto Dawn web series. Green also starred in the 2015 film Downriver and 2022 film Of an Age.

== Early life ==
Green is one of ten children. After having eight biological children, his parents began fostering before then adopting. He grew up in Woonona, a suburb of Wollongong in New South Wales, and attended Holy Spirit College in Bellambi.

Green started dancing around the age of 11 or 12, training at the Joanne Grace School of Dance in Wollongong for about eight years in ballet, contemporary, jazz and modern. At the age of 12, he joined Kids Casting Agency, a drama group, where he trained for a year. Open auditions had him spending weekends travelling to Sydney to try out for roles in Pine O Cleen and Nescafé television commercials. From age 16, he also took Saturday hip hop classes at Urban Dance Centre in Sydney.

== Career ==
Beginning his professional career in 2007, at the age of 16, Green's first role was in the Network Ten telemovie Emerald Falls alongside actors Vince Colosimo, Georgie Parker and Catherine McClements. The film was originally intended as a television pilot, but was not picked up. That year, he also made his stage debut in 2007 playing Phillip in Lockie Leonard with the Merrigong Theatre Company.

In 2008, Green starred in two Australian short films, Vafadar and The Ground Beneath, after attending an open casting call for the latter. For his role as Kaden in The Ground Beneath, he received a nomination at the 2008 AFI Awards and won the Best Actor award in 2009 at the St Kilda Film Festival. Following this period, Green signed with a new agent.

At the age of 17, Green moved into a share house in Sydney, soon after which, in 2009, he landed a 19-episode role as Dexter Walker in Home and Away, a starring role in Voyeurnet, and a part in the feature film Beneath Hill 60, alongside Brendan Cowell and Gyton Grantley. He then began filming his role as Sammy on ABC television series Dance Academy on 13 July 2009, offering him the opportunity to revisit his love of dancing on-screen. That same year, he also performed in a theatre production of The Nargun and the Stars for the Perth International Arts Festival and the Sydney Festival. In 2012, he starred in the Robert Carter drama film, Thirst, alongside Hanna Mangan-Lawrence, Myles Pollard and Victoria Haralabidou.

Green relocated to Los Angeles at the age of 20, where he land a role in his first American production, Halo 4: Forward Unto Dawn, a web miniseries based on the video games. But after four and a half years, he failed to secure any further roles in the States, and headed back to Australia. He moved back in with his parents in Wollongong at the age of 27 and started working at a local Bonds retail store, while occasionally booking television advertisements.

Green then signed with the same agent as his former Dance Academy co-star, Dena Kaplan and eight months later, in 2020, secured a role in the third season of Stan black comedy miniseries Eden, his first acting job in five years.

In 2022, Green starred as Adam in Goran Stolevski's romantic drama film Of an Age, seeing him nominated for Best Actor at the Auscritic Awards, the FCCA Awards and the AACTA Awards. He then appeared as part of the ensemble cast of the 2024 Stan series Exposure. That same year, he played the recurring role of Rudi Janosi in drama series Ladies in Black, the second adaptation of the 1993 novel The Women in Black by Madeleine St John, after the 2018 film by Bruce Beresford.

In 2025, Green played the part of Lenny in the award-winning miniseries Apple Cider Vinegar, based on the real life story of convicted scammer and fraudulent wellness influencer Belle Gibson. In January 2025, Green was named in the cast for Tasmania-set murder mystery series The Survivors, a six-part adaptation of Jane Harper's 2020 novel of the same name. The series premiered on Netflix on 6 June 2025, with Green playing the role of Sean Gilroy, a character who lost his older brothers to a tragedy 15 years earlier.

== Filmography ==
=== Television ===
Year	Title	Role	Notes	Ref.
2008	Emerald Falls	Zac Ferguson	TV film	
2008	Too Far	Tom	TV pilot	
2009	Home and Away	Dexter Walker	19 episodes	
2010–2012	Dance Academy	Samuel Lieberman	Seasons 1-2, 52 episodes	
2011	East West 101	Seth Rawlins	1 episode	
2012	Jack Irish: Bad Debts	Francis	TV movie	
2012	Halo 4: Forward Unto Dawn	Thomas Lasky	Web series, 5 episodes	
2013	Camp	Kip Wampler	10 episodes	
2021	Eden	Bodie Palmer	Miniseries, 3 episodes	
2021	Mr Inbetween	Jason	1 episode	
2024	Exposure	Bronson	3 episodes	
2024	Ladies in Black	Rudi Janosi	5 episodes	
2025	Apple Cider Vinegar	Lenny	Miniseries, 2 episodes	
2025	The Survivors	Sean Gilroy	6 episodes	
2026	Wentworth: Halfway Home	Tom Cavendish	TV series	

=== Film ===
Year	Title	Role	Notes	Ref.
2008	Vafadar	Vafa	Short film	
2008	The Ground Beneath	Kaden	Short film	
2008	MyBWS	Son	Video	
2009	Voyeurnet	Trent	Short film	
2009	Beneath Hill 60	Warren Hutchings	Feature film	
2010	St George	Customer 4	Video	
2010	Smith	Smith	Short film	
2010	Woolworths	Son	Video	
2012	Thirst	Zac	Feature film	
2015	Downriver	Anthony	Feature film	
2022	Of an Age	Adam	Feature film	
2023	We Used to Own Houses	Tom	Short film	
2026	Kick On	Roman Petrenko	Feature film	

== Theatre ==
Year	Production	Role	Location	Ref.
2005	Lockie Leonard	Phillip	Merrigong Theatre Company, Wollongong	
2009	The Nargun and the Stars	Simon	Regal Theatre, Perth with Perth International Arts Festival, Sydney Festival	

== Awards and nominations ==
Year	Work	Award	Category	Result	Ref.
2008	The Ground Beneath	AFI Awards	Best Young Actor	Nominated	
2008	The Ground Beneath	Ourense Independent Film Festival	Best Actor	Won	
2009	The Ground Beneath	St Kilda Short Film Festival	Best Actor	Won	
2013	Halo 4: Forward Unto Dawn	Streamy Awards	Best Male Performance: Drama	Nominated	
2016		Cannes Film Festival Jury Prize	Best Performance in a Male Role in a Feature Film	Won	
2016	Downriver	Iris Prize	Best Actor	Won	
2023	Of An Age	Auscritic Awards	Best Actor	Nominated	
2023	Of An Age	FCCA Awards	Best Actor	Nominated	
2024	Of An Age	AACTA Awards	Best Lead Actor in Film	Nominated	
2025	The Survivors	Equity Ensemble Awards	Outstanding Performance by an Ensemble in a Miniseries or Telemovie	Nominated	
