= QueerCineMad =

LGBT film festival

- Location: Madrid, Spain
- Founded: 1996
- Language: International
- Website: http://www.lesgaicinemad.com

QueerCineMad, formerly LesGaiCineMad, Festival Internacional de Cine LGBT de Madrid (Madrid International Gay and Lesbian Film Festival) is an LGBT film festival held in Madrid, Spain, organized by the Fundación Triángulo and usually held in November.

== History ==
The inaugural event was held in 1996. Approximately 14,000 attendees were estimated to have attended the 2010 event.

In 2021, the festival introduced the "Dissident Cinema" category for films that fell outside prevailing norms of production.

== Resources ==
QueerCineMad has a digital catalogue of more than 3,000 independent movies and is considered to be a major archive of films on the subject of affective diversity in Spain and other Spanish-speaking countries.

QueerCineMad created and leads the CineLGBT Network. It involves more than 30 festivals from Latin America and Spain, which receive support and economic aid to organize their own activities.

== LesGaiCineMad Spanish Film Market (SFM) ==
LesGaiCineMad Spanish Film Market (SFM) was an event that ran in Spain until 2009 as part of LesGaiCineMad. SFM was a marketplace where producers and sales companies of the films in the SFM catalogue licensed films to distributors, as well as a booking place for international film festival programmers to find content for their own film festivals.

Additionally, SFM held training events for independent film production and distribution and served as a meeting point for members of the independent cinema community to have professional meetings, parties, and receptions.

It was not audience oriented; only accredited industry members were able to attend SFM events.

== Other projects ==
LesGaiCineMad has also launched other year-round projects, including a Lesbian film festival held in April since 2011, events held at Pride celebrations in Madrid, and collaborations with LGBTQ filmmakers in Latin America.

In 2019 they launched QueerCineLab, which offers resources such as mentoring to aspiring and emerging LGBTQ filmmakers.

== See also ==
- List of LGBT film festivals
