= Melbourne Queer Film Festival =

Annual LGBT film festival in Melbourne, Australia

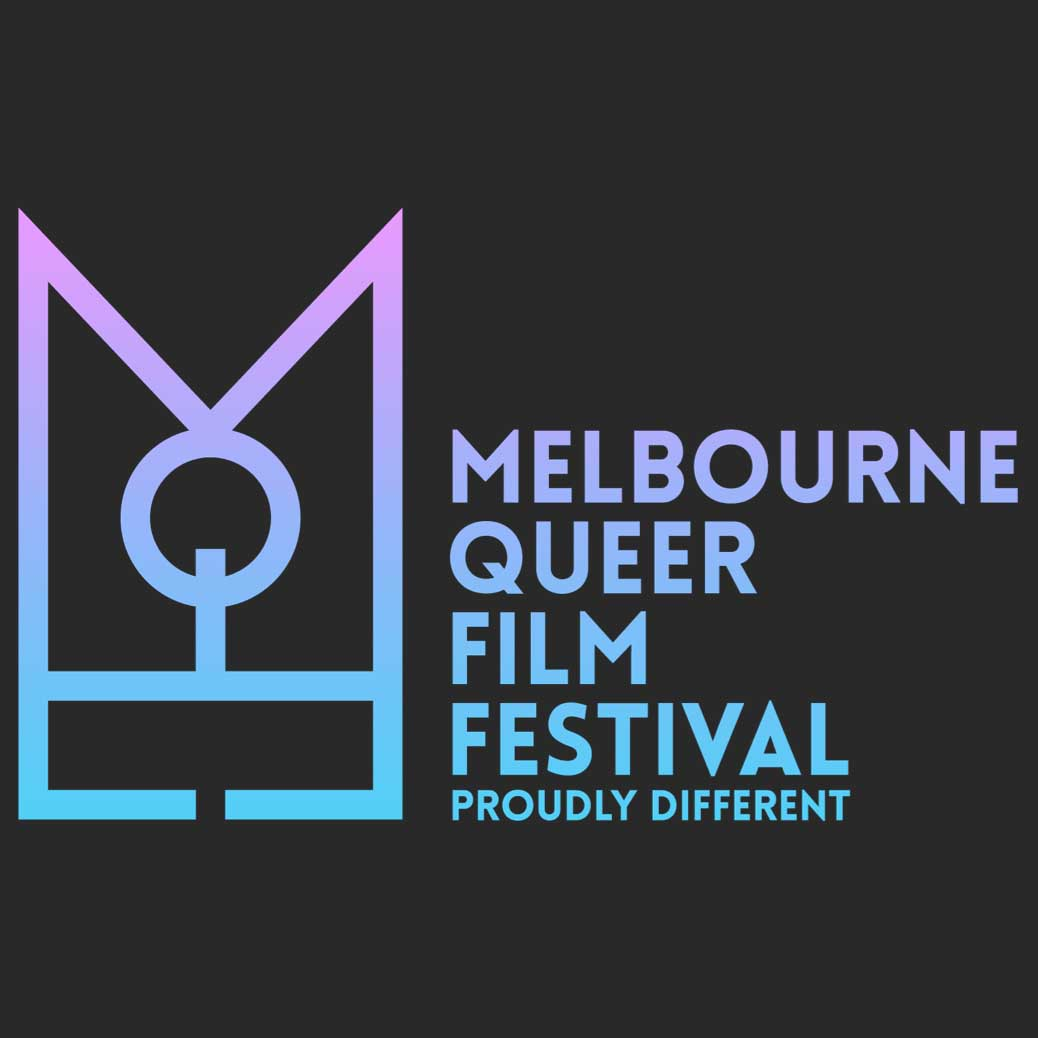
- Genre: LGBTIQ+ Film Festival
- Locations: Melbourne, Australia
- Founded: 1 February 1991; 35 years ago
- Attendance: 23,000 (2015)
- CEO: David Martin Harris
- Website: mqff.com.au

The Melbourne Queer Film Festival (MQFF) is an annual LGBT film festival held in Melbourne, Victoria, Australia in November. Founded in 1991, it is the largest and oldest queer film event in Australia. In 2015, the festival attracted around 23,000 attendees at key locations around Melbourne.

Melbourne Queer Film Festival showcases contemporary queer cinema from Australia and internationally, and includes feature films, documentaries, and short films, including world and Australian premieres. The film festival is hosted at the Australian Centre for the Moving Image (ACMI), Cinema Nova, and Village Cinemas.

== History ==
Melbourne Queer Film Festival sprang from the Melbourne International Lesbian & Gay Film Festival, which was first screened in 1991. The new Melbourne-born film festival was the initiative of Midsumma Festival as an attempt to present a community-based alternative to the several gay-themed but commercially intended film festivals that came to Melbourne each year around the time of the Sydney Mardi Gras. Most of these belonged to Sydney cinema chains and lengthy seasons of successful films often followed these film seasons.

The festival's opening night film in February 1991 was Longtime Companion at the Dendy Brighton Cinemas. The film was due for its commercial release shortly later and the festival is credited as being an important factor in the film's success in Melbourne. The film festival was organised with lesbian films on every night at 6pm and gay films on 9pm. Following opening night screenings took place at the National Theatre in St Kilda, also the home of the 1992 festival.

It was originally as part of the Midsumma Festival, which had started in 1989. The Midsumma board asked filmmaker Lawrence Johnston and lesbian bar owner Pat Longmore to be the first festival co-directors. It drew good audiences and was a marked success. The 1992 Festival also screened at the National Theatre and opened with the film adaptation of David Leavitt's novel The Lost Language of Cranes. In early 1992 the film festival took up residence at Hares & Hyenas bookshop in Commercial Road, South Yarra, which was founded by Crusader Hillis and Rowland Thomson a few months before in December 1991. The film festival was housed at the back of the bookshop until 1995. The three co-directors of the 1992 festival, Pat Longmore, Crusader Hillis and Helen Eisler, rebranded the Melbourne Lesbian & Gay Film & Video Festival in recognition of video's increasing prominence in film at the time. The 1992 festival was notable for its focus on films that broke with the tradition of coming out narratives, featuring BDSM, post punk films, including ones by Bruce LaBruce and films by emerging filmmakers of colour. Teenage Sadie Benning was a festival guest with their short films shot on the toy Fischer-Price PXL camera. Sadie went on to develop an important career in video, installation and as the founder of the feminist post-punk band, Le Tigre. The festival made a small loss and Midsumma abandoned plans for future iterations.

With a filing cabinet of filmmaker contacts still at Hares & Hyenas, in mid-1992, Crusader Hillis and Rowland Thomson of Hares & Hyenas set about conducting public meetings at the bookshop to attract new members to help steer the festival. In September 1992 they met with UK actor and writer Madeleine Swain, her partner of the time, Suzie Goodman, and film enthusiast Frances O'Connor. At the suggestion of Hillis and Thomson, the festival was renamed queer, and the day following the meeting, Hillis incorporated the festival as an association, the first festival in the world using Queer as its collectivising feature. It was moved to March under the name Melbourne Queer Film and Video Festival and screened at the State Film Theatre at Treasury Place. After two years with Swain as President and director, Tamara Jungwirth was recruited as Festival Director and a period of rapid expansion ensued. In 1995, the festival started Movies Under the Stars, screening classics in a picnic atmosphere at Fairfield amphitheatre.

In 1996, a touring program went to five interstate capitals including Hobart, where homosexual activity was still a crime. The festival played a part in the establishment of queer film festivals in Brisbane, Bendigo, Far North Queensland and in New South Wales.

In 1997, Claire Jackson became president. In 1998 City of Melbourne came on as supporter through their arts grants. Lisa Daniel joined as Festival Director for the 1999 festival and a period of rapid growth began.

In 2003 the name was changed to Melbourne Queer Film Festival and in 2004 the screenings moved to the new ACMI with opening nights at the Astor Theatre.

In 2010, screenings expanded to Greater Union on Russell Street. In 2011, MQFF headed to the Art Deco Sun Theatre in inner west Footscray with a satellite festival over a weekend in late August. Opening nights moved to ACMI in 2012.

== Description ==
The Melbourne Queer Film Festival, held in November each year, is the largest queer film event in the Southern Hemisphere. In 2015, it attracted around 23,000 attendees.

In 2019, MQFF screened at The Capitol, Cinema Nova in inner north Carlton, and Village Jam Factory in South Yarra. In 2021, it screened films at the Australian Centre for the Moving Image (ACMI), Cinema Nova, and Village Cinemas.
