= List of film festivals in Canada =

This is a list of film festivals that take place (or took place) in Canada. The list below notes when a festival is considered a qualifying festival for the purposes of the Canadian Screen Awards.

== Overview ==
A variety of genre-specific, regional and specialty film festivals take place throughout the year, with important festivals in this class including Toronto's Hot Docs, the Montreal International Documentary Festival and Vancouver's DOXA for documentary films, Toronto's Inside Out and Montreal's Image+Nation for LGBTQ-themed films, Montreal's Fantasia for horror, science fiction and thriller genre films, and the Ottawa International Animation Festival for animated films. In Saskatchewan, Regina International Film Festival, based in Regina, has been referred to as “The People’s Festival of Canada” for its emphasis on accessibility and community engagement.

The primary "festival season", comprising the largest and most important general-interest film festivals, takes place almost entirely in the months of September and October, including the largest and most prominent festival in Canada, Toronto International Film Festival (which, along with Berlin, Cannes, Venice, and Sundance, is one of the "Big Five" international film festivals), followed by the Vancouver International Film Festival, the Cinéfest Sudbury International Film Festival, the Calgary International Film Festival, the Festival du nouveau cinéma in Montreal and the Atlantic International Film Festival in Halifax. The final significant film festival of the year is the Whistler Film Festival in early December, whose Borsos Competition provides a significant platform for independent films by emerging Canadian filmmakers. Many, though not all, Canadian films will screen at one or more of these festivals before going into commercial release later in the fall or sometime in the following year.

== National ==
Name	City	Notes	CSA	Ref
Air Canada enRoute Film Festival	Toronto, Montreal, Vancouver and aboard domestic Air Canada flights	Short films		
Canadian Labour International Film Festival (CLiFF)	Locations throughout Canada	Established in 2009		
National Canadian Film Day	Locations throughout Canada			
Tournée Québec Cinéma	Locations throughout Canada	Francophone films	Yes	

== Alberta ==
Name	City	Notes	CSA	Ref
Artifact Small Format Film Festival	Calgary			
Banff Mountain Film Festival	Banff		Yes	
Banff World Media Festival	Banff		Yes	
Bleak Midwinter Film Festival	Calgary	Animation		
Calgary Independent Film Festival	Calgary		Yes	
Calgary International Film Festival	Calgary		Yes	
Calgary Underground Film Festival	Calgary		Yes	
Central Alberta Film Festival	Red Deer			
Dreamspeakers International Film Festival	Edmonton	Indigenous films	Yes	
Edmonton International Film Festival	Edmonton		Yes	
Edmonton Short Film Festival	Edmonton		Yes	
FAVA Fest	Edmonton		Yes	
Fairy Tales Queer Film Festival	Calgary	LGBT film	Yes	
Giant Incandescent Resonating Animation Festival	Calgary	Animated film		
Lethbridge International Film Festival	Lethbridge			
Marda Loop Justice Film Festival	Calgary	Documentary films	Yes	
Okotoks Film Festival	Okotoks			
The Mosquers Film Festival	Edmonton	Films by Muslim filmmakers		
Nordlys Film and Arts Festival	Camrose		Yes	
NorthWestFearFest	Edmonton	Horror and thriller films		
Northwestfest	Edmonton	Documentary films	Yes	
Rainbow Visions Film Festival	Edmonton	LGBT film	Yes	
Red Deer Justice Film Festival	Red Deer	Documentary films		
Reel Shorts Film Festival	Grande Prairie		Yes	

== British Columbia ==
Name	City	Notes	CSA	Ref
Abbotsford Film Festival	Abbotsford		Yes	
Chilliwack Independent Film Festival	Chilliwack		Yes	
Crazy8s	Vancouver			
DOXA Documentary Film Festival	Vancouver	Documentary films	Yes	
Fake Flesh Film Festival	Kamloops	Horror shorts		
Festival Cinéloops	Kamloops	Francophone films		
GEMFest	Vancouver	Formerly known as the Vancouver International Women in Film Festival	Yes	
Gender Equity in Media Festival	Vancouver		Yes	
Homeground Festival	Vancouver		Yes	
International South Asian Film Festival Canada	Vancouver		Yes	
Invermere Film Festival	Invermere		Yes	
Kamloops Black Film Festival	Kamloops			
Kamloops Film Festival	Kamloops		Yes	
Kamloops Independent Short Shorts Film Festival	Kamloops			
Ma Boli International Punjabi Film Festival	Surrey			
MENA film festival	Vancouver		Yes	
Powell River Film Festival	Powell River			
Reel 2 Real International Film Festival for Youth	Vancouver	Films catered towards youth audiences	Yes	
Rendez-Vous French Film Festival	Vancouver		Yes	
Run N Gun 48 Hour Film Festival	Vancouver			
Salt Spring Film Festival	Saltspring Island		Yes	
Short Circuit Pacific Rim Film Festival	Victoria		Yes	
Skoden Indigenous Film Festival	Vancouver	Indigenous films		
Spark Animation Festival	Vancouver	Animation festival	Yes	
Stseptékwles re Sk’elép (Coyote Stories) Indigenous Film Festival	Kamloops		Yes	
Sundar Prize Film Festival	Surrey			
Vancouver Asian Film Festival	Vancouver		Yes	
Vancouver Horror Show Film Festival	Vancouver		Yes	
Vancouver International Black Film Festival	Vancouver		Yes	
Vancouver International Film Festival	Vancouver		Yes	
Vancouver International Mountain Film Festival	Vancouver	Films about outdoor adventure, recreation and mountain culture	Yes	
Vancouver Latin American Film Festival	Vancouver		Yes	
Vancouver Queer Film & Video Festival	Vancouver	LGBT films		
Vancouver Short Film Festival	Vancouver	Short films	Yes	
Vancouver Web Fest	Vancouver		Yes	
Victoria Film Festival	Victoria		Yes	
Whistler Film Festival	Whistler		Yes	
Wild & Scenic Film Festival	Invermere			
World Community Film Festival	Courtenay and Kelowna	Documentary films		

== Manitoba ==
Name	City	Notes	CSA	Ref
African Movie Festival in Manitoba	Winnipeg		Yes	
Afro Prairie Film Festival	Winnipeg		Yes	
Canadian International Comedy Film Festival	Winnipeg		Yes	
Cinémental	Winnipeg	Francophone films	Yes	
Freeze Frame International Film Festival	Winnipeg		Yes	
Gimli Film Festival	Gimli		Yes	
Gimme Some Truth Documentary Festival	Winnipeg	Documentary films	Yes	
NSI Film Exchange Canadian Film Festival	Winnipeg	Defunct		
Riding Mountain National Park Film Festival	Wasagaming			
Reel Pride	Winnipeg	LGBT films	Yes	
University of Winnipeg Film Festival	Winnipeg	Presented by the University of Winnipeg		
Winnipeg Aboriginal Film Festival	Winnipeg	Indigenous films	Yes	
Winnipeg International Film Festival	Winnipeg	Defunct		
Winnipeg Jewish Film Festival	Winnipeg			
Winnipeg Real to Reel Film Festival	Winnipeg		Yes	
Winnipeg Underground Film Festival	Winnipeg			

== New Brunswick ==
Name	City	Notes	CSA	Ref
DocTalks Festival and Symposium	Fredericton	Documentary films	Yes	
Festival international du cinéma francophone en Acadie	Moncton	Francophone films	Yes	
Indigenous Film Festival	Fredericton	Indigenous films		
Pink Lobster Film Festival	Fredericton	LGBTQ films		
Saint John Jewish Film Festival	Saint John	Jewish films		
Silver Wave Film Festival	Fredericton		Yes	

== Newfoundland and Labrador ==
Name	City	Notes	CSA	Ref
Bonavista Film Festival	Bonavista			
Corner Brook Pride Film Festival	Corner Brook	LGBT films		
Nickel Film Festival	St. John's		Yes	
Smith Sound Film Festival	George's Brook-Milton			
St. John's International Women's Film Festival	St. John's		Yes	

== Northwest Territories ==
Name	City	Notes	CSA	Ref
Dead North Film Festival	Yellowknife	Horror, fantasy and science fiction films; defunct		
Yellowknife International Film Festival	Yellowknife		Yes	

== Nova Scotia ==
Name	City	Notes	CSA	Ref
Animation Festival of Halifax	Halifax	Animated films	Yes	
Atlantic International Film Festival	Halifax		Yes	
Atlantic Jewish Film Festival	Halifax	Jewish films		
Devour! The Food Film Fest	Wolfville		Yes	
Emerging Lens Film Festival	Halifax		Yes	
Halifax Black Film Festival	Halifax		Yes	
Halifax Independent Filmmakers Festival	Halifax		Yes	
Hellifax Horror Film Festival	Halifax		Yes	
Lunenburg Doc Fest	Lunenburg	Documentary films	Yes	
Nova Scotia Retro Film Festo	Halifax	Screens classic independent films by Nova Scotia directors		
OUTeast Film Festival	Halifax	LGBT films		

== Nunavut ==
Name	City	Notes	CSA	Ref
Alianait Arts Festival	Iqaluit	Film screenings as part of a larger music and arts festival	Yes	
Nunavut International Film Festival	Iqaluit	Free festival devoted to children's films; formerly called the Nunavut Children's Film Festival		

== Ontario ==
Name	City	Notes	CSA	Ref
Ageless Film Festival	Toronto	Films about senior citizen issues		
AGH Film Festival	Hamilton			
aluCine Latin Film and Media Arts Festival	Toronto	Latin American films		
Asinabka Film and Media Arts Festival	Ottawa	Indigenous films	Yes	
Barrie Film Festival	Barrie		Yes	
Belleville Downtown DocFest	Belleville	Documentary films		
Blood in the Snow Canadian Film Festival	Toronto		Yes	
Bloody Horror International Film Festival	Ottawa		Yes	
Blue Mountain Film Festival	Collingwood			
Breakthroughs Film Festival	Toronto	Devoted to short films by emerging women and non-binary filmmakers	Yes	
Breast Fest Film Festival	Toronto			
Buffer Festival	Toronto		Yes	
CFC Worldwide Short Film Festival	Toronto	Short films		
Canadian Film Festival	Toronto		Yes	
Canadian Sport Film Festival	Toronto	Films about the cultural, social and political context of sports		
CaribbeanTales International Film Festival	Toronto		Yes	
CineFAM Film Festival	Toronto	Films by BIPOC women	Yes	
Cinéfest Sudbury International Film Festival	Sudbury		Yes	
Cinéfranco	Toronto	Francophone films	Yes	
County Adaptation Film Festival	Picton	Festival devoted exclusively to film adaptations of literature		
European Union Film Festival	Toronto	European films; one film from each EU country screened free		
Female Eye Film Festival	Toronto		Yes	
Festival Objectif Cinéma Desjardins	Ottawa	Francophone films	Yes	
Festival of International Virtual & Augmented Reality Stories	Toronto			
Film North – Huntsville International Film Festival	Huntsville			
Forest City Film Festival	London		Yes	
Future of Film Showcase	Toronto	Short films	Yes	
Global Tourism Film Festival	North Bay	Films about tourism and travel		
Grand River Film Festival	Cambridge		Yes	
Guelph Film Festival	Guelph	Documentary films	Yes	
Hamilton Film Festival	Hamilton		Yes	
Hamilton Black Film Festival	Hamilton			
Hamilton Queer Film Festival	Hamilton	LGBTQ films		
Hollywood North Film Festival	Picton, Quinte West, Belleville	Independent films		
Hot Docs Canadian International Documentary Festival	Toronto	Documentary films; accredited by FIAPF.	Yes	
Images Festival	Toronto		Yes	
ImagineNATIVE Film + Media Arts Festival	Toronto	Indigenous films	Yes	
Indigenous Film Festival	Forest	Indigenous films		
Inside Out Ottawa Lesbian and Gay Film and Video Festival	Ottawa	LGBT films	Yes	
Inside Out Toronto Lesbian and Gay Film and Video Festival	Toronto	LGBT films	Yes	
International Film Festival of Ottawa	Ottawa	Launched in 2020	Yes	
International Film Festival of South Asia	Toronto	South Asian films	Yes	
Italian Contemporary Film Festival	Toronto	Italian and Italian-Canadian films	Yes	
Junction North International Documentary Film Festival	Sudbury	Documentary films	Yes	
Kingston Canadian Film Festival	Kingston	Canadian films	Yes	
Lambton Film and Food Festival	Forest			
Latin American Film Festival	Toronto	Latin American films	Yes	
London Lesbian Film Festival	London	LGBT films	Yes	
Lost Episode Festival Toronto	Toronto		Yes	
Making Scenes Film and Video Festival	Ottawa	LGBT films. Defunct 2005, replaced with Ottawa edition of Inside Out.		
Meaford International Film Festival	Meaford		Yes	
Milton Film Festival	Milton		Yes	
Mirror Mountain Film Festival	Ottawa	Independent, underground and alternative films	Yes	
Mosaic International South Asian Film Festival	Mississauga		Yes	
Mosaic Nights Film Festival	Alliston, Barrie	International films, centred on films from a different specific country each year		
Mulan International Film Festival	Toronto	Chinese films	Yes	
Muskoka Queer Film Festival	Bracebridge, Huntsville			
Muslim International Film Festival	Toronto			
North Bay Film Festival	North Bay			
North by Northeast	Toronto		Yes	
Northwest Film Fest	Thunder Bay			
Oakville Festivals of Film and Art	Oakville	Social issues festival - screens Canadian and international features, documentaries, shorts	Yes	
One World Film Festival	Ottawa	Documentary films		
Open Roof Festival	Toronto		Yes	
Ottawa Black Film Festival	Ottawa		Yes	
Ottawa Canadian Film Festival	Ottawa		Yes	
Ottawa International Animation Festival	Ottawa	Animated films	Yes	
Ottawa International Film Festival	Ottawa	Defunct		
Ottawa Film Festival	Ottawa	Program of short films screened at the University of Ottawa		
Pendance Film Festival	Toronto			
Planet in Focus	Toronto		Yes	
Punjabi International Film Festival	Toronto			
Queer North Film Festival	Sudbury	LGBT films	Yes	
Rainbow Reels Queer and Trans Film Festival	Kitchener-Waterloo	LGBT films	Yes	
Reel Stories	Barrie	Documentary films	Yes	
ReelAbilities Film Festival	Toronto	Films about physical and mental disability	Yes	
Reelout Queer Film Festival	Kingston	LGBT films	Yes	
Reelworld Film Festival	Toronto		Yes	
ReFrame Film Festival	Peterborough	Documentary films		
Regent Park Film Festival	Toronto		Yes	
Rendezvous with Madness	Toronto	Films about mental health		
Routes to Roots Film Festival	Norfolk County	Centres on films with local connections to the Haldimand-Norfolk region		
Sault Film Festival	Sault Ste. Marie	Independent films by Northern Ontario filmmakers		
Sex Workers' Film and Arts Festival	Hamilton	Films about sex work		
Shadows of the Mind Film Festival	Sault Ste. Marie	Films about mental health		
Shorts That Are Not Pants	Toronto	Short films		
South Western International Film Festival	Sarnia		Yes	
Stratford Film Festival	Stratford	Defunct		
Stratford Winter Film Festival	Stratford	New in 2024		
Sudbury Outdoor Adventure Reels (SOAR) Film Festival	Sudbury			
Sudbury's Tiny Underground Film Festival (STUFF)	Sudbury	One-day festival of underground and experimental films, launched 2022		
Take 21	Toronto	Defunct; student films		
TIFF Kids	Toronto	Children's films	Yes	
TIFF Next Wave	Toronto	Canadian and international feature films of youth interest and short films by amateur youth filmmakers		
Timmins Film Festival	Timmins			
Toronto After Dark Film Festival	Toronto		Yes	
Toronto Arab Film Festival	Toronto		Yes	
Toronto Black Film Festival	Toronto			
Toronto Food Film Festival	Toronto		Yes	
Toronto Independent Film Festival	Toronto		Yes	
Toronto International Film Festival	Toronto	One of the prestigious "Big Five" film festivals; accredited by FIAPF.	Yes	
Toronto International Nollywood Film Festival	Toronto		Yes	
Toronto International Teen Movie Festival	Toronto	Defunct		
Toronto Japanese Film Festival	Toronto		Yes	
Toronto Jewish Film Festival	Toronto	Jewish films	Yes	
Toronto Motorcycle Film Festival	Toronto	Stories told through the lens of motorcycling		
Toronto Palestine Film Festival	Toronto		Yes	
Toronto Queer Film Festival	Toronto	LGBTQ-themed experimental film	Yes	
Toronto Reel Asian International Film Festival	Toronto		Yes	
Toronto Short Film Festival	Toronto		Yes	
Toronto Tamil Film Festival	Toronto	Tamil films		
Toronto Urban Film Festival	Toronto			
T.O. Webfest	Toronto		Yes	
Toronto Youth Shorts Film Festival	Toronto			
Videodrunk Film Festival	Whitby	Underground film	Yes	
Vox Popular Media Arts Festival	Thunder Bay			
Waterloo Festival for Animated Cinema	Waterloo	Animated films		
Weengushk International Film Festival	Manitoulin Island	Indigenous films	Yes	
Willson Oakville Film Festival	Oakville		Yes	
Water Docs	Toronto	Documentary films about water and environmental protection		
Windsor International Film Festival	Windsor		Yes	
Windsor Jewish Film Festival	Windsor			
World of Comedy Film Festival	Toronto	Defunct		

== Prince Edward Island ==
Name	City	Notes	CSA	Ref
Anchor Fest	Charlottetown	Formerly the Charlottetown Film Festival	Yes	

== Quebec ==
Name	City	Notes	CSA	Ref
Abitibi-Témiscamingue International Film Festival	Rouyn-Noranda		Yes	
Animaze Montreal International Film Festival	Montreal	Animated films	Yes	
Canada China International Film Festival	Montreal		Yes	
Canadian Independent Film Festival	Montreal			
Canadian Student Film Festival	Montreal	First established in 1969 as a standalone event, later became a programming stream within the Montreal World Film Festival, Defunct.		
Carrousel international du film de Rimouski	Rimouski	Children's films	Yes	
Ciné-Sept	Sept-Îles		Yes	
Cinemania	Montreal		Yes	
Cinoche International Film Festival of Baie-Comeau	Baie-Comeau		Yes	
Comedia	Montreal	Program of comedy films screened as part of the Just for Laughs comedy festival		
Concordia Film Festival	Montreal	Festival of student films staged by Concordia University		
Courts d'un soir	Montreal	Short films	Yes	
Cuisine, Cinéma & Confidences	Baie-Saint-Paul	Festival of food-related films and culinary events	Yes	
Eat My Shorts	Montreal	Short comedy films screened in conjunction with Just for Laughs	Yes	
Fantasia Festival	Montreal		Yes	
Festival de films d'auteur de Val-Morin	Val-Morin			
Festival de films pour l'environnement	Saint-Casimir	Environmental films	Yes	
Festival du film de l'Outaouais	Gatineau		Yes	
Festival du nouveau cinéma	Montreal	Oldest still-running film festival in Canada; accredited by FIAPF.	Yes	
Festival Filministes	Montreal	Feminist films	Yes	
Festival Images en vues	Les Îles-de-la-Madeleine	Short films		
Festival Stop Motion Montreal	Montreal	Stop-motion animation	Yes	
First Peoples' Festival (Presence autochtone)	Montreal		Yes	
Hudson Festival of Canadian Film	Hudson		Yes	
IF3 International Freeski Film Festival	Montreal		Yes	
Image+Nation	Montreal	LGBT films	Yes	
International Festival of Films on Art	Montreal		Yes	
Knowlton Film Festival	Knowlton			
Korean Film Festival Canada	Montreal	Korean films	Yes	
Longue Vue sur le court	Montreal	Short films	Yes	
Massimadi Festival	Montreal	Canadian and international films about Black LGBTQ people and issues	Yes	
Montreal Critics' Week	Montreal	Launched in 2025		
Montreal International Black Film Festival	Montreal		Yes	
Montreal International Children's Film Festival	Montreal		Yes	
Montreal International Documentary Festival	Montreal	Documentary films	Yes	
Montreal Independent Film Festival	Montreal	Since 2020; for independent films		
Montreal International Film Festival	Montreal	Defunct		
Montreal Israeli Film Festival	Montreal	Jewish and Israeli films; formerly the Montreal Jewish Film Festival		
Montreal World Film Festival	Montreal	Defunct		
Les Percéides	Percé		Yes	
Plein(s) écran(s)	Montreal	Short films	Yes	
Pop Montreal	Montreal	Music-related films screened in conjunction with a music performance festival	Yes	
Quebec City Film Festival	Quebec City		Yes	
Regard – Saguenay International Short Film Festival	Saguenay	Short films	Yes	
Rendez-vous Québec Cinéma (Montreal)	Montreal		Yes	
Rendez-vous Québec Cinéma (Quebec City)	Quebec City		Yes	
Sherbrooke World Film Festival	Sherbrooke		Yes	
Social Impact Film and Art Festival	Montreal			
Sommets du cinéma d'animation	Montreal		Yes	
South Asian Film Festival of Montreal	Montreal	South Asian films	Yes	
Vues d'Afrique	Montreal		Yes	
Vues dans la tête de...	Rivière-du-Loup		Yes	
Urban Films Festival	Montreal	Qualifying event to select the Canadian submission to France's Urban Films Festival competition	Yes	
Wakefield Documentary Film Festival	Wakefield	Documentary films		
The YoungCuts Film Festival	Montreal			

== Saskatchewan ==
Name	City	Notes	CSA	Ref
Ācimowin Film Festival	Saskatoon	Indigenous films		
Cinergie	Saskatoon	Francophone films	Yes	
Living Skies Student Film Festival	Regina	Festival exhibiting films by University of Regina film students		
Mispon: A Celebration of Indigenous Filmmaking	Regina	Indigenous films	Yes	
Queer City Cinema	Saskatoon	LGBT films	Yes	
Regina International Film Festival	Regina		Yes	
Saskatchewan International Film Festival	Various locations			
Saskatoon Fantastic Film Festival	Saskatoon		Yes	
Reel Rave International Film Festival	Waskesiu Lake			
Yorkton Film Festival	Yorkton		Yes	

== Yukon ==
Name	City	Notes	CSA	Ref
Available Light Film Festival	Whitehorse		Yes	
Out North Queer Film Festival	Whitehorse	LGBT films	Yes	
Yellowknife International Film Festival	Yellowknife			

== The Largest Film Festivals in Each Canadian Province ==
	Province	Festival Name	Acronym	known for	Ref
1	Alberta	Calgary International Film Festival	CIFF	Western Canada’s largest film festival	
2	British Columbia	Vancouver International Film Festival	VIFF	Canada’s gateway to Asian cinema	
3	Manitoba	Gimli International Film Festival	GIFF	largest rural film festival in Canada	
4	New Brunswick	Silver Wave Film Festival	SWFF	New Brunswick’s premier film festival	
5	Newfoundland and Labrador	St. John’s International Women’s Film Festival	SJIWFF	Canada’s leading women-focused film festivals	
6	Nova Scotia	Atlantic International Film Festival	AIFF	The East Coast’s TIFF-equivalent	
7	Ontario	Toronto International Film Festival	TIFF	One of the "Big Five" film festivals in the world	
8	Prince Edward Island	Charlottetown Film Festival	CFF	PEI’s flagship film event	
9	Quebec	Fantasia Film Festival	FFF	The world’s largest genre film festival	
10	Saskatchewan	Regina International Film Festival and Awards	RIFFA	The People’s Festival of Canada	
11	Northwest Territories	Yellowknife International Film Festival	YIFF	The Arctic Screens Festival	

== See also ==
- List of film festivals
