= Mostafa Keshvari =

Iranian-born Canadian Filmmaker and Screenwriter

- مصطفی کشوری
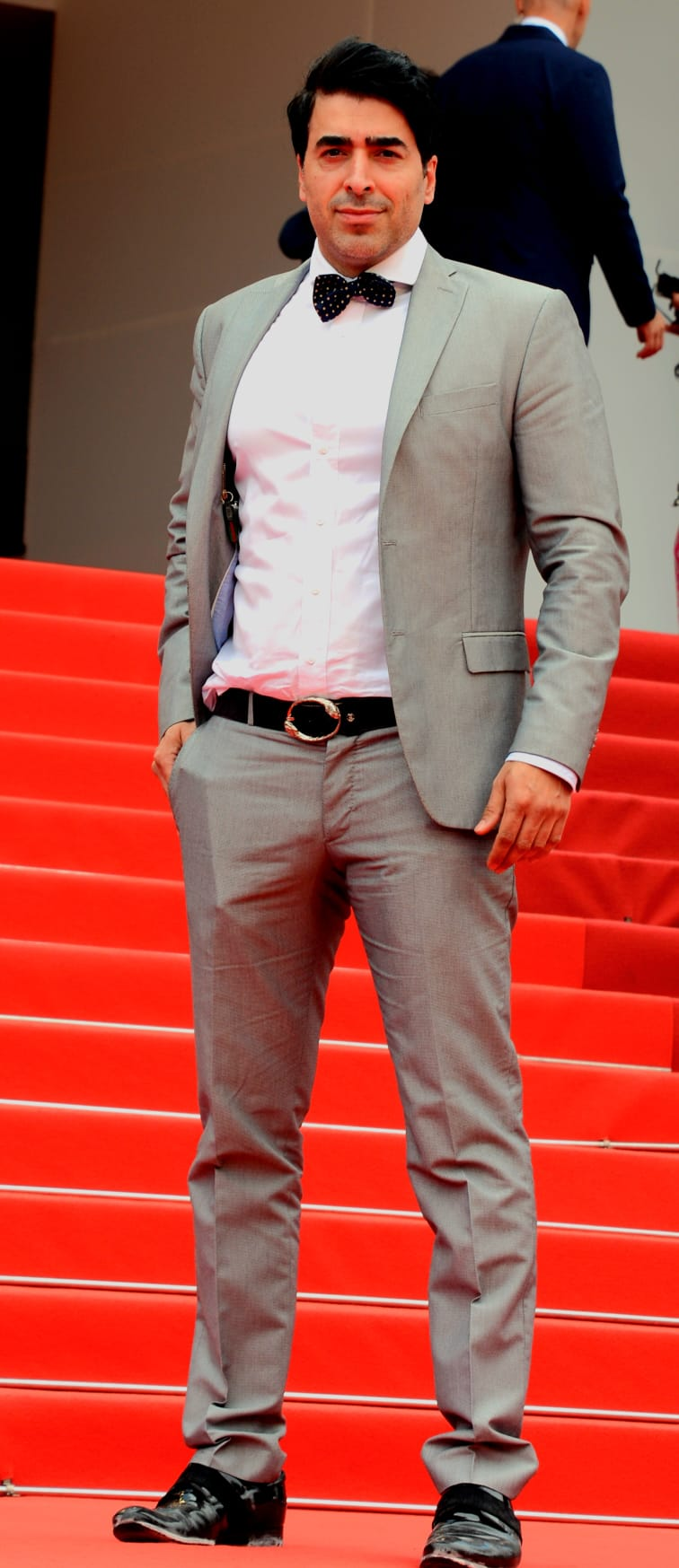
- Occupations: Filmmaker, screenwriter

Mostafa Keshvari (Persian: مصطفی کشوری) is an Iranian-born Canadian filmmaker and screenwriter. In 2022, he was listed as a finalist for the Top 25 Canadian Immigrant Awards.

== Career ==
Keshvari started his film directing career in 2015. His first featured film Unmasked won numerous awards at international film festivals. The film is about a young Muslim immigrant woman secretly joins an acting class. His debut short film I Ran was selected in 2015 Cannes Short Film Corner. Keshvari′s film, Child Bride was premiered at the 2019 Cannes Film Festival. Keshvari directed the film Corona during the COVID-19 pandemic. The film received international attention for reportedly being the first feature film about the COVID-19 pandemic. Keshvari directed Eternal Igloo, an animated short film, released in 2021. The film won Golden Sheaf Award for Best Multicultural Film at the Yorkton Film Festival in 2021. The film received Best Sound Award, Best Musical Score Award and was nominated for Best Art Direction award at the 2021 Leo Awards. It also won the Best International Short Film Awards at Oakville Festivals of Film and Art.

Mostafa's third feature film Colorblind world premiered at Montreal international Black Film festival and Whistler Film Festival in 2022 where it was nominated in 5 categories. The film screened at Toronto, Ottawa and Calgary black film festival where it was positively reviewed by the black community. The film was released by Gravitas Ventures on 4 April 2023. Mostafa Keshvari's film Colorblind garnered critical acclaim, with the Best Writer award and a nomination for Best Director at the Indie Film Awards, capturing the attention of critics. It was made in collaboration with color scientists to accurately represent colorblindness and metaphorically address racism.

Mostafa's latest drama feature film about Omar Khayyam is set to be shot in Bukhara, Uzbekistan.

Mostafa Keshvari is a member of the federation of Canadian Artists as a surreal painter. His oil on canvas paintings have been exhibited at various exhibitions across Canada.

Mostafa's short film For Her was shortlisted for the DGC Award for Best Short Film at the Directors Guild of Canada awards in 2023.

== Selected filmography ==
=== Director, writer and producer ===
- I Ran - 2015, short
- Dream of a Paper Plane - 2016, short
- Modern Monk - 2017, documentary
- One Journey - 2018, short
- Music Box - 2018
- Corona - 2020
- Child Bride - 2020, short
- The Will and the Wall - 2020, short
- Eternal Igloo - 2021
- Unveiled (Unmasked) - 2022
- For Her - 2023
- Colorblind - 2023 (Distributed by Gravitas Ventures)
- Khayyam - TBA
