= Being Black in Halifax =

2020 Canadian documentary film and television series

Being Black in Halifax is a Canadian documentary film and television series, which premiered in 2020 on CBC Television and CBC Gem. Created in conjunction with Fabienne Colas's Being Black in Canada foundation, the series selects several emerging filmmakers each year to create and produce short documentary films about Black Canadian life and experience in Halifax, Nova Scotia, which are screened at the Halifax Black Film Festival before being broadcast as an episode of the CBC's Absolutely Canadian series and streamed on CBC Gem.

The series is a companion to Being Black in Toronto, a similar collaboration between the CBC and Colas' Toronto Black Film Festival.

The four films in the 2020 series were Francesca Ekwuyasi's "Black + Belonging", Bradley Bright's "Normal", Latesha Auger's "The Journey of Self Love" and Harmony Adesola's "Youth Hiphop and Halifax". Four more films — "Farrin" by Lily Nottage, "The Search for Healing" by Tyler Simmonds, "A Passion Made New" by Dena Williams and "North Preston: The Untold Story" by Kardeisha Provo — were broadcast in 2021.

Four new films, Guyleigh Johnson's "Scratching the Surface", Deborah Castrilli's "Framework", Tyus McSween's "Washed Up" and Jodell Stundon's "Finding a Way Out", premiered at HBFF in 2022.

== Awards ==
At the 10th Canadian Screen Awards in 2022, the series received a Canadian Screen Award nomination for Best Documentary Program, and Nottage, Simmonds, Williams and Provo won for Best Direction in a Documentary Series. Johnson, Castrilli, McSween and Stundon were nominated for Best Direction in a Documentary Series at the 11th Canadian Screen Awards in 2023.
