= Richard Lett =

Canadian stand-up comedian, poet and actor

- Born: Richard Glen Lett; Camrose, Alberta, Canada

Comedy career
- Genres: black comedy; observational comedy
- Subjects: addiction; alcoholism; self-deprecation

Richard Glen Lett is a Canadian stand-up comedian, poet and actor. He is known for comedy focusing on drug and alcohol recovery and men's health.

== Career ==
=== Comedy ===
Lett began a career in stand-up comedy in the 1980s touring nationally for Yuk Yuk's. Lett has opened for Trailer Park Boys actors Robb Wells, John Paul Tremblay, and Mike Smith and singer Michael Bublé.

In his early career, Lett was often described as "Canada's George Carlin". He was known for his divisive, controversial, and sometimes obscene shows. In 2009, Lett was banned from comedy clubs across Canada due to his increasingly abusive behaviour fuelled by his alcohol and drug addiction. Lett was the focus of the biographical movie Never Be Done: The Richard Glen Lett Story, which follows Lett's journey from addiction to rehab to recovery. The film won Best Documentary Feature at the Hollywood South Film Festival.

In 2010, Lett began doing stand-up comedy in support of drug and alcohol recovery. He has since performed at over 100 recovery conventions, treatment centres and 12-step fundraisers. He received a "Word of Mouth" grant from the Ontario Arts Council in 2014, which supported his work on his solo show Sober But Never Clean. The autobiographical show "played to sold-out crowds". Lett's comedy show, One Nut Only, tells the story of his battle with testicular cancer. After surviving addiction, cancer and COVID-19, Richard wrote and performed Hard2Kill at the 2020 Vancouver Fringe Festival.

=== Poetry ===
In 2013, Lett entered the world of competitive slam poetry under the moniker "Optimus Rhyme". He won the 2013 Toronto Grand Slam Championship and led his Toronto Poetry Slam to win the 2013 Canadian Festival of Spoken Word. The team represented Canada in the 2013 National Poetry Slam in Boston, Massachusetts.

=== Acting ===
Lett has performed in a number of television roles including single episode roles in Dark Angel, Supernatural, and The Firm. He played the lead role in the web series Pay Up, which won six awards at the LAweb Fest.

He played the role of Dennis in the film All Joking Aside, about a young woman struggling to make it in stand-up comedy. His performance was described as a "delight". Lett played the role of "despicable Richard" in the movie Corona, a story about seven people trapped in an elevator who realize that one of them has COVID-19. Corona is thought to be the first film about the COVID-19 pandemic.
