= Queer North Film Festival =

LGBTQ film festival in Ontario, Canada

- Location: Sudbury, Canada
- Established: 2016
- Festival date: Opening: June 18, 2026; Closing: June 21, 2026
- Website: sudburyindiecinema.com

The Queer North Film Festival is an annual film festival in Sudbury, Ontario, which presents an annual program of LGBTQ film. Presented by the Sudbury Indie Cinema Co-op, the festival was staged for the first time in 2016. The same organization also stages the city's Junction North International Documentary Film Festival.

On two past occasions, the festival has presented retrospective screenings of 1990s documentary films about the LGBTQ community in Sudbury, Mum's the Word (Maman et Ève) in 2017 and The Pinco Triangle in 2018.

In 2026 the festival launched a new short film competition for LGBTQ amateur filmmakers from the Northern Ontario region, to be screened at the festival with a $300 prize for the film judged to be the best work in the competition.

The festival's executive director is Beth Mairs.

The event is a qualifying festival for the Canadian Screen Awards.

== Format ==
Spanning four days, the festival has three segments. The Northern Ontario Premier is a showcase for Northern Ontarian LGBTQ+ films made within a year prior to the event. The 2026 Pride Spotlight is screenings of classic LGBTQ+ films. This year, the films include The Birdcage, The Watermelon Woman, and No Pride in Genocide. Finally, the RT Collective Presents: Queer Shorts From The North is a short film and video contest for amateur Northern Ontario filmmakers. Shortlisted films will receive a $150 prize and be screened at the Queer North Film Festival. One outstanding work will also receive a $300 prize.

== Awards ==
The 2016 and 2018 editions of the festival presented various awards for the films in those years' programs but has not otherwise presented or announced awards in other years.

=== 2016 ===
- Audience Choice, Best of Show: Fire Song — Adam Garnet Jones
- Audience Choice, Best Women's Film: Suicide Kale — Carly Usdin
- Audience Choice, Best Men's Film: Those People — Joey Kuhn
- Audience Choice, Best Trans Film: The Pearl of Africa — Jonny von Wallström
- Audience Choice, Best Two-Spirit Film: Two Soft Things, Two Hard Things — Mark Kenneth Woods, Michael Yerxa
- Jury Award, Best Canadian Film: Fire Song — Adam Garnet Jones
- Jury Award, Best Narrative Short: Dawn — Rose McGowan
- Jury Award, Best Documentary Short: Handsome & Majestic — Jeff Petry, Nathan Drillot
- Jury Award, Best Northern Ontario Film: Shades of Reality
- Jury Award, Best Foreign Film: Dawn — Rose McGowan

=== 2018 ===
- Audience Choice, Best of Show: The Pinco Triangle — Patrick Crowe, Tristan R. Whiston
- Audience Choice, Best Women's Film: Chavela — Catherine Gund, Daresha Kyi
- Audience Choice, Best Trans Film: Transformer — Michael Del Monte
- Audience Choice, Best Men's Film: Call Me By Your Name — Luca Guadagnino
- Jury Award, Best Canadian Film: The Pinco Triangle — Patrick Crowe, Tristan R. Whiston
- Jury Award, Best Northern Ontario Film: The Pinco Triangle — Patrick Crowe, Tristan R. Whiston
- Jury Award, Best Narrative Short: Something About Alex — Reinout Hellenthal
- Jury Award, Best Documentary Short: Grey Violet – Odd One Out — Reetta Aalto

== See also ==
- List of LGBT film festivals
- List of film festivals in Canada
