= Balikbayan: From Victims to Survivors =

2020 Canadian documentary film

- Directed by: Jon Jon Rivero; Rob Hillstead
- Written by: Jon Jon Rivero
- Cinematography: Bernie Hernando; Rob Hillstead
- Edited by: Lindsey Canning; Bernie Hernando; Rob Hillstead
- Music by: John McMillan
- Production companies: Qi Creative; Echolands Creative Group; Dark Gems Media
- Release date: October 7, 2020; (EIFF)
- Running time: 84 minutes
- Country: Canada
- Language: English

Balikbayan: From Victims to Survivors is a 2020 Canadian documentary film directed by Rob Hillstead and Jon Jon Rivero.

The film documents Jon Jon Rivero's volunteer service in Tacloban from 2007 to 2019. Every 2 years, Jon Jon would bring his fellow Filipino Canadian occupational therapists to provide art centered therapy for street children in the city. The volunteer program was made possible with their long-term partnership with Streetlight Philippines and was founded by Norwegian volunteer Erlend Johannesen in 2004.
A major turning point in the documentary is the devastating effects of Typhoon Haiyan on the city of Tacloban last November 7, 2013. Jon Jon's team needed to adjust their therapy to the traumatic events of this natural disaster. The documentary highlights the lifelong impact of volunteerism on both its volunteers and beneficiaries.

Another important theme of the documentary is to represent story of second generation Filipino Canadians. Jon Jon Rivero's parents, Dr. Jose Zamora Rivero and Mrs. Gloria Rivero, immigrated from the Philippines to Regina, Saskatchewan, Canada in the 1970s. Both parents promoted Filipino Folk Dances & Music with the next generation of Filipino Canadians, their two sons Jon Jon and Joel. In turn, Jon Jon would share his knowledge and skill of Filipino dance to the children in Tacloban. When Jon Jon was 2 years old, his father was diagnosed with a brain tumor. This influenced him to take occupational therapy as he and his family grew up learning how to take care of his father. His father eventually passed on January 16, 2002. Dr. Jose Zamora Rivero wanted his children to visit his hometown of Tacloban. Jon Jon was able to fulfill this promise by touring the Philippines with Filipino-Canadian Saranay Association in 2006. He was filled with a sense of service that he returned in 2007 to begin the Balikbayan Project.

== Production ==
=== Background ===
In 2002, Dr. Rivero passed away and it was his dying wish for Jon Jon to experience the Philippines. Jon Jon was able to fulfill this promise in 2006. This trip made a big impression on Jon Jon and he returned a year later by conducting occupational therapy workshops for street children through the Streetlight Philippines Foundation.

Rivero started filming his experiences to show friends and family back home. The producer of WolfCop, Bernie Hernando, saw the footage and approached Rivero about doing a documentary. The two took several trips back and filmed in the late 2000s and early 2010s.

Jon Jon was inspired to film the documentary because of the raw footage style found in Exit Through the Gift Shop. At this point, he wasn't exactly confident about the final ending for the film.

On November 13, 2013, Typhoon Yolanda/Haiyan hit Tacloban City and had 6,352 fatalities. Jon Jon and his Qi Creative team returned in 2014 and revised their workshops to include the entire community. Their work shifted to building resilience for the residents after the traumatic events of the typhoon.

=== Shooting and editing ===
Rob Hillstead was brought on as a director/producer in 2014 to take over directing duties while Jon Jon conducted the "My Name is Trauma" workshops. Rob and Jon Jon teamed up to record and shoot a music video, entitled Rise Up! Tacloban, a song performed by members of Streetlight and the Balikbayan team chronicling their experiences with Typhoon Yolanda/Haiyan and the aftermath. It was released independently in 2015. Rob was in Tacloban for 3 weeks conducting interviews and filming alongside the Balikbayan team and Streetlight helping the kids work through their traumatic experiences. While Jon Jon captured his perspective through the use of a gopro and selfie stick, Rob artfully filmed timelapses of Tacloban and intimate candid portraits of those participating in Streetlight's recovery process.

Over the next several years, Rob, Bernie, Paula Rivero, and Jon Jon would shoot for another 6 days in Edmonton and Vancouver, conducting new interviews with all the Canadian participants and shooting interstitial b-roll. Due to the nature of a documentary with hundreds of hours of footage, the film went through multiple editors, to be finalized by Rob Hillstead in facilities provided by 24 Frames Digital Films in Vancouver and Dark Gems Media in Burnaby.

In 2019, with the birth of his daughter Lena, Jon Jon decided that her introduction closed the generational themes between him and his father represented in the film. As such, the team started finalizing the documentary to be released, enlisting composer Jon McMillan to score the film. The finished film was released in 2020.

== Release ==
The film made its worldwide premiere in the 2020 Edmonton International Film Festival held last October 7, 2020. For this festival, it won the Audience Choice Award for Feature Documentary. It was featured online in the Regina International Film Festival last August 2021.

It was chosen as 2021 Rosie Awards nominee for Best Documentary and Best Director by the Alberta Media Production Industries Association (AMPIA).

=== Critical reception ===
"Colin MacLean of the Gig City wrote,"Balikbayan is resolutely life-affirming and positive throughout...There are moments here that grip the heart."
