= Toronto Outdoor Picture Show =

Outdoor film festival in Toronto

- Location: Toronto, Ontario, Canada
- Founded: 28 August 2011; 14 years ago (as the Christie Pits Film Festival)
- Website: topictureshow.com

The Toronto Outdoor Picture Show (TOPS) is an annual outdoor film festival that takes place in Toronto, Ontario, Canada. Founded in 2011 as the Christie Pits Film Festival, the festival has since grown into a popular summer activity in the city, with screenings across three parks welcoming tens of thousands of attendees each summer. The festival is organized by a charitable organization and is funded through a combination of donations, sponsorships, and public funding.

== History ==
The Toronto Outdoor Picture Show was founded in 2011 by Emily Reid shortly after completing a Master of Arts in cinema studies at the University of Toronto. Originally called the Christie Pits Film Festival (CPFF) after the park it took place in, the festival began on August 28, 2011 with a screening of Steven Spielberg's Catch Me If You Can (2002).

In January 2015, the organization was registered as a not-for-profit and was re-branded as the Toronto Outdoor Picture Show. In February 2020, TOPS became a registered charitable organization.

The 2015 Christie Pits Film Festival was the first to expand to a full summer event, presenting seven screenings in July and August. In 2016, the festival held its first screening outside of Christie Pits with a showing of Nosferatu (1922) in Queensway Park, Etobicoke. TOPS also presented their first screening in Corktown Common that year. In 2017, TOPS brought summer-long programming to Corktown Common, Parkway Forest Park, and Christie Pits. In 2018 they expanded to also bring programming to Fort York. During the 2019 festival, TOPS committed $90,000 to funding nine Canadian Short Film productions in advance of their upcoming tenth season.

TOPS celebrated its tenth anniversary in August 2020, with ten consecutive nights of programming in Fort York. Each night they welcomed 100 socially distanced audience members to watch films from past festivals. They also welcomed members of the community to join by allowing them to play the audio through their home speakers and watch from their windows and balconies.

The 2021 festival, presented as "TOPS and Friends," included screenings that were curated by a variety of Toronto-based film festivals and arts organizations including Inside Out, Vector Festival, Toronto Palestine Film Festival, Regent Park Film Festival, Breakthroughs Film Festival, Goethe-Institut Toronto, Sou Sou, and Toronto Reel Asian International Film Festival.

== Programming ==
Since 2012, each year's festival has featured programming that follows a specific theme. For instance, the 2025 programme, entitled When we were young, consisted of coming of age films such as Richard Linklater's Dazed and Confused (1993) and Jane Schoenbrun's I Saw the TV Glow (2024).

TOPS programming usually includes a combination of classic and contemporary feature and short films, with each evening's screening generally consisting of a couple of short films followed by a feature. Many of the short films are made by Canadian filmmakers and are meant to highlight local talent.

== Organization and Funding ==
TOPS has been registered charity with the Canadian federal government since February 2020. In 2024, 44% of their revenue came from public funding including grants from the Canada Council for the Arts, the Ontario Arts Council, Telefilm Canada, and the City of Toronto. About 35% of their funding came from donations and gifts from other charities. TOPS also receives funding through sponsorships and advertising from organizations like Meridian Credit Union, Kanopy, and Fiesta Farms.

TOPS is operated by a board of 12 directors and trustees. They employ four full-time senior staff consisting of the Artistic & Executive Director Emily Reid who founded TOPS, Development Manager Shelby Leimert, Manager of Program Administration Isabella Brown, and Head of Production Gemma Bordonaro. TOPS also relies on volunteers over the course of the summer to facilitate the operations of the festival.
