= Mum's the Word (film) =

- French: Maman et Ève
- Directed by: Paul Carrière
- Produced by: Danièle Caloz; Jacques Ménard
- Cinematography: François Beauchemin; Martin Leclerc
- Edited by: Cathy Gulkin
- Music by: John Lang
- Production companies: Médiatique; National Film Board of Canada
- Release date: September 10, 1996 (MWFF)
- Running time: 54 minutes
- Country: Canada
- Language: French

Mum's the Word (French: Maman et Ève) is a Canadian documentary short film, directed by Paul Carrière and released on September 10, 1996. The film centres on Rachel, Suzanne, Jeannine and Paulette, four Franco-Ontarian women in their mid-40s in Sudbury, Ontario, who, after marrying and raising children, are in the process of coming out as lesbian.

The film won the Genie Award for Best Short Documentary Film at the 17th Genie Awards.

The film premiered at the Montreal World Film Festival in August 1996, and was screened at the 1996 Toronto International Film Festival and the Cinéfest Sudbury International Film Festival in September.

The film received a 20th anniversary screening at Sudbury's Queer North Film Festival in 2017. Paulette Gagnon, the development director of the city's Place des Arts project and the only one of the four women whose full name is known on the record, participated in media interviews to promote the screening; she also appeared in a smaller capacity in the 1999 documentary film The Pinco Triangle. Gagnon died in October 2017, several months after the film screening, and the film was screened again at the Junction North International Documentary Film Festival in November 2017 as a memorial tribute to Gagnon.
