= Carly Usdin =

American director, writer, and producer (born 1982)

- Born: 1982 (age 43–44)
- Education: University of Central Florida
- Occupations: Filmmaker, writer
- Years active: 2016–present
- Notable work: Suicide Kale; Heavy Vinyl
- Website: carlyusdin.com

Carly Usdin (born 1982) is an American director, writer, and producer. Usdin is best known for directing the 2016 film Suicide Kale and co-creating the comic book series Heavy Vinyl with Nina Vakueva. In 2019, they received the Jury Prize for Best Director for the short film Misdirection at the Los Angeles Diversity Film Festival.

== Early life and education ==
Usdin was raised in Monmouth County, New Jersey. They are Jewish. Usdin began to identify as a lesbian at age 16 and came out at age 20, but later said that their identity is constantly in flux. They attended the University of Central Florida and received their bachelor's degree in film.

== Career ==
=== Film ===
Usdin's feature film directorial debut, Suicide Kale, was released in 2016. Written by and starring Brittani Nichols, it also stars Jasika Nicole, Brianna Baker, and Lindsay Hicks. It received the Audience Award for Best First Dramatic Feature at 2016 Outfest.

In 2017, they were the showrunner and director for a digital web series called Threads, which was distributed through Verizon's Go90 platform. The show was an anthology series that dramatized stories inspired by real events. It was hosted by Milana Vayntrub and ran for 20 episodes.

They were accepted into the American Film Institute’s Directing Workshop for Women's class of 2019 cohort, through which they wrote, produced, and directed the short film Misdirection starring Vico Ortiz. The film tells the story of Cam, a college freshman struggling with obsessive-compulsive disorder (OCD) and a crush on their straight college roommate, who becomes interested in close-up magic. Usdin drew on their personal experience with OCD to portray the protagonist's symptoms of counting. It was accepted as a 2019 Official Short Film Selection at the Bentonville Film Festival.

In 2021 Usdin partnered with Reese Witherspoon's media company Hello Sunshine to produce a film sponsored by Baileys and Bumble. The short film, First Date, stars Shalita Grant and Shannon Woodward.

=== Comic books ===
Usdin co-created and wrote the comic book series Hi-Fi Fight Club in August 2017, published by Boom! Studios and illustrated by Nina Vakueva. The series centers on a queer teenage girl who begins working at a record store where the employees have a clandestine, all-female vigilante fight club. In November 2017, it was announced that the series' name had been changed to Heavy Vinyl. Thrillist named it one of the 25 best comic books of 2018; Syfy Wire selected Usdin as one of the 30 best writers for comics in September 2017 for their work on Heavy Vinyl. The series was nominated for a 2018 Prism Award for Best Comic from a Mainstream Publisher. A follow-up called Heavy Vinyl: Y-2KO was released in March 2020.

The first issue of Usdin's second comic book series, The Avant-Guards, was released in January 2019. The series had 12 issues in total. Written by Usdin and illustrated by Noah Hayes, it tells the story of a transfer student at an all-girls performing arts college who joins the school's fledgling basketball team.

== Personal life ==
In 2012, Usdin married photographer and producer Robin Roemer. Usdin is non-binary and uses they/them pronouns.

== Filmography ==
Year	Title	Credited as			Notes
Year	Title	Director	Writer	Producer	Notes
2016	Suicide Kale	Yes	No	Executive	
2017	Threads	Yes	No	Executive	Web series, directed 10 episodes
2019	Misdirection	Yes	Yes	Yes	Short film
2019	Wizard School Dropout	Yes	No	No	Web series
2021	First Date	Yes	Yes	No	Short film

== See also ==
- List of non-binary writers
