= Sudbury Indie Cinema Co-op =

The Sudbury Indie Cinema Co-op is an organization based in Sudbury, Ontario, which operates the city's first dedicated repertory and art film movie theatre.

The organization's founder and executive director is Beth Mairs, a filmmaker and former adventure tourism entrepreneur. She was also the New Democratic Party candidate for the Sudbury electoral district in the 2019 Canadian federal election.

== History ==
The organization was founded in 2013, as a project to take over and relaunch the movie theatres in the downtown Rainbow Centre Mall after the mall owners announced that they would be closed. Although the committee initially failed to reach a deal, they subsequently announced plans to launch their own theatre in the former gymnasium of the closed Saint-Louis-de-Gonzague elementary school on Mackenzie Street, concurrently with the school's planned redevelopment as a residential condominium.

As they worked to secure funding for the redevelopment of the Mackenzie Street venue, the committee began organizing screenings at various venues throughout the city, including Sudbury Secondary School, the Greater Sudbury Public Library, the Sudbury Theatre Centre and the Fraser Auditorium at Laurentian University. After Imagine Cinemas acquired and reopened the Rainbow Centre theatre as the Downtown Movie Lounge in 2016, the co-op also screened some films there, but continued to work toward opening the Mackenzie Street facility rather than relying on the Downtown Movie Lounge as its permanent venue.

The Mackenzie Street facility opened in February 2019, with its first public event being that year's edition of the Junction North International Documentary Film Festival, although the facility still only had temporary bleacher seating at the time as its permanent seats had not yet been installed. Once the installation of the permanent seating had been completed, an official opening ceremony followed in June with a ribbon-cutting ceremony presided over by Sudbury mayor Brian Bigger.

During the COVID-19 pandemic, the organization closed its theatre to public screenings, but partnered with the virtual cinema initiatives of Film Movement and Kino Lorber to continue operations. The theatre reopened in August 2020, with social distancing, capacity restrictions and masking policies in place. Around the same time, they also reached out to begin offering their theatre as a venue for fundraisers and special events for other arts and cultural organizations in the city. The theatre then underwent another brief COVID-related shutdown over the winter of 2021, before fully reopening in February; however, due to continued issues in the film distribution ecosystem, it operated only on a part-time schedule through the first half of 2021, until returning to full-time daily programming in August.

In October 2023, the co-op announced a sponsorship deal with the city's credit union, which will see the theatre renamed the Sudbury Credit Union Theatre.

In April 2024, the co-op revealed that the Mackenzie Street facility had been sold to new owners who declined to renew the theatre's lease past February 2025. In May, the board announced that they were reviewing opportunities to relocate to either the Thorneloe University building on the Laurentian University campus, or the Knox Hall performance venue on Larch Street. At Knox Hall, the organization would be able to remain downtown, but would have to reduce programming to only part of the week to share the venue with musical performances, and would not be able to run a full-size projector; at Thornloe, the organization could continue its current scheduling and programming models, but would have to relocate outside the downtown core. In June, the co-op revealed that the new landlord had decided to extend the deadline for three more years, giving the organization more time to plan for and undertake its eventual relocation.

In April 2026, the co-op announced that it will relocate to 30 Ste. Anne Rd, a former nun's residence operated by the Diocese of Sault Sainte Marie, Ontario until its closure, in 2027. The new location will again see the adaptive reuse of a gymnasium, although much of the organization's existing equipment and infrastructure can simply be moved from the existing Mackenzie facility just a short distance away.

Around the same time, Mairs announced her retirement from the leadership of the organization.

== Activities ==
In addition to screening a regular program of Canadian and international independent films, the organization coordinates several annual specialty film festivals, including Junction North for documentary films, the Queer North Film Festival for LGBTQ films, the Sudbury Outdoor Adventure Reels Film Festival for films about wilderness adventure and travel, Sudbury's Tiny Underground Film Festival (STUFF) for underground and experimental films, and the Sudbury Indie Creature Kon for horror films.

It also stages special events, such as a three-day Studio Ghibli festival in 2023, an annual National Canadian Film Day event, a festival of dance films, and a recurring Saturday Morning All-You-Can-Eat Cereal Cartoon Party featuring a compilation of classic retro children's cartoon programming presented with a selection of popular children's breakfast cereal for refreshments.

Regular screening series include Women in Film Wednesdays to highlight films directed by women, First Peoples Thursday to highlight indigenous film, and Samedi Cinema for French-language films.

In January 2023, the co-op celebrated its 10th anniversary by running a retrospective series of films that had originally been released in 2013, including The Hunt, Frances Ha, Stories We Tell and Drug War.

In October 2024 the theatre mounted its first full shadow cast screening of The Rocky Horror Picture Show, in conjunction with local theatre group Mooncrater Theatre.

At the time of the 2026 relocation announcement, the co-op revealed that its visitor statistics show that an overall average of nine per cent of cinemagoers visiting the facility are from out of town, rising to as much as 15 per cent during the specialty film festivals, and bringing an estimated CA$500,000 into the city's economy annually.
