= I Know a Place (film) =

- Directed by: Roy Mitchell
- Produced by: Jane Farrow
- Starring: Bob Goderre
- Release date: 1999
- Running time: 30 minutes
- Country: Canada
- Language: English

I Know a Place is a Canadian short documentary film, directed by Roy Mitchell and released in 1999. A reflection on gay life in Sault Ste. Marie, Ontario, the film profiles Bob Goderre, a retired steelworker who hosted regular parties for gay residents of the region in his home in the 1960s and 1970s.

The film has often been analyzed alongside The Pinco Triangle, a documentary film about LGBT life in Sudbury which was released in the same year.

The film premiered at the 1999 Inside Out Film and Video Festival, where it was the winner of the award for Best Documentary Film. In 2000, it was screened at Toronto's Cinecycle theatre as part of The Best of Everything, a program of Mitchell's short films that also included Christian Porn, Delta Dawn and Proud Drivers of Canada.

In 2006, it received its first-ever screening in Sault Ste. Marie, at an Algoma University College event called Queer Voices from the North.
