= London Lesbian Film Festival =

Lesbian film festival in Ontario, Canada

- Location: London, Ontario, Canada
- Founded: 1991
- Festival date: Opening: May 1, 2026; Ending: May 3, 2026
- Website: www.llff.ca

The London Lesbian Film Festival is an annual film festival in London, Ontario, which presents a program of lesbian-interest films. The only exclusively lesbian-oriented film festival in North America, the event has been staged by the Reeling Spinsters organization since 1991, making it the longest running lesbian film festival in North America.

== History ==
The festival was launched in 1991 by Reeling Spinsters, a volunteer-run organization led by a group of lesbian, bisexual and queer women. The history of the organization was documented in 2012 in a short film titled Bending The Lens: 20 Years of the London Lesbian Film Festival by Mary J Daniel.

In 2023, the festival celebrated 30 years with a celebration at Anderson Craft Ales.

== Films ==
In 2024, the festival screened 17 films:

- Betty and Jean. Director: Elinor Randle (UK)
- Chuck Chuck Baby. Director: Janis Pugh (UK)
- Come Correct. Director: Molly Coffee (USA)
- Dealing. Director: Kendall Alex Payne (USA)
- Dorothy Arzner, Pioneer, Queer, Feminist. Director: Clara and Julia Kuperberg (France)
- F**ked. Director: Sara Harrak (UK)
- Hex the Patriarchy. Director: Anne Brashier (USA)
- Janelle Niles: Inconvenient. Director: Cass Gardiner & Kelly Zemnickis (Canada)
- Longing. Director, Courteney Tan (UK)
- Mal de Amores. Director: Fiorella Vescovi (USA)
- Neo Nahda. Director, May Ziadé (UK)
- Not Quite That. Director: Ali Grant (Canada)
- Old Lesbians. Director: Meghan McDonough (USA)
- Summer Night’s Fantasy. Director: Guby Moon (Spain)
- Summer with Maria. Director: Joanna Ślesicka (Poland/Spain)
- Sweet Forty. Director: Annlin Chao (UK)
- There are Things to Do. Director: Mike Syers (USA)

== See also ==
- List of LGBT film festivals
- List of film festivals in Canada
- List of women's film festivals
