= Reel Pride =

Annual LGBT film festival in Winnipeg, Canada

Reel Pride is an annual gay, lesbian, bisexual, transgender and two-spirit film and video festival produced by the Winnipeg Gay and Lesbian Film Society in Winnipeg, Manitoba, Canada.

== History ==
The Winnipeg Gay and Lesbian Film Society, Inc. was registered as a non-profit incorporation under Manitoba statutes on September 20, 1985. Between 1985 and 1989 the group organized monthly film series, bringing to Manitoba audiences gay and lesbian films otherwise not seen in Winnipeg. These were advertised to Winnipeg's gay & lesbian community by mailouts.

The first film festival was produced in 1987 as a joint project of the Winnipeg Gay and Lesbian Film Society and Plug In, Inc. and named Counterparts. All of the festivals that followed have been produced by the Society. Since 2000, the festivals have been known by the name "Reel Pride".

== Festival list ==
As of 2013 there have been twenty festivals:

- Counterparts International Festival of Gay and Lesbian Films: April 25 - May 3, 1987
- Counterparts II: April 22–30, 1988
- Counterparts III Festival of Lesbian & Gay Films: October 17–21, 1989
- Counterparts IV: April 26 - May 3, 1991
- Counterparts V: October 16–23, 1992
- Counterparts 6: April 29 - May 3, 1994
- Reel Pride: June 12–18, 2000
- Reel Pride 2001: A Nuptial Odyssey: June 1–9, 2001
- Reel Pride 2002: Blurring The Lines: September 27 - October 3, 2002
- Reel Pride X: October 31 - November 2, 2003
- Reel Pride XI: November 24–28, 2004
- Reel Pride XII: November 15–20, 2005
- Reel Pride XIII: Queer-ited Energy: November 7–12, 2006
- Reel Pride XIV: October 16–21, 2007
- Reel Pride XV: October 14–19, 2008
- Reel Pride XVI: October 13–17, 2009.
- Reel Pride XVII: October 7–9 and 14–16, 2010.
- Reel Pride XVIII: October 6–8 and 13–15, 2011.
- Reel Pride XIX: October 9–14, 2012.
- Reel Pride XX: October 15–20, 2013.
- Reel Pride XXI: October 14–19, 2014.
- Reel Pride XXII: October 13–18, 2015.

In addition to film series and festivals, the Society has from time to time organized a variety of individual film-related events.

== See also ==
- List of LGBT film festivals
- List of film festivals in Canada
