= Toronto Youth Shorts Film Festival =

Canadian youth film festival

Toronto Youth Shorts
- 2011 Toronto Youth Shorts Film Festival campaign art
- Location: Toronto, Ontario, Canada; Innis College
- Founded: 2009 by Henry Wong
- Film titles: Short Films (20 Minutes and Under)
- Directors: Filmmakers aged 14–28 in the Greater Toronto Area
- Festival date: June, 2012
- Language: English
- Website: http://www.torontoyouthshorts.ca/

The Toronto Youth Shorts Film Festival is a showcase of short films, video art and new media projects held during the summer in Toronto, Ontario, Canada. All work is made by young people living in the Greater Toronto Area. While the festival used to be open to those aged 18–28, it has now opened its submission call to those aged 14–28.

As a festival that it only accepts work by artists residing in the Greater Toronto Area, it is a forum to spotlight the work of local emerging artists. Toronto is a city with many film festivals that highlights commercial and international work. The idea behind Toronto Youth Shorts is to highlight the locality of not only the people involved but also the content of the films. It is the only festival that restricts submissions to those residing in the Greater Toronto Area. Films screened include those made by current students and graduates of notable fine arts programs from Toronto Metropolitan University, OCAD, Humber College and York University. All films are under 20 minutes in length.

The festival events include screenings of work and occasionally a panel of industry guests to speak in relevant topics of the local film industry. At the end of the festival, there is an awards gala to celebrate the work of the filmmakers screened where a jury made up of industry professionals select their top picks screened at the festival and bestow upon them various awards and accolades.

Now Magazine calls it "a festival with an intriguing mandate and a sense of genuine discovery."

== History ==
The Toronto Youth Shorts Film Festival was founded in 2009 by Henry Wong, a graduate of the University of Toronto Scarborough where he coordinated screenings of student films. This festival started off as his final project for the Event Management postgraduate program at Centennial College and eventually evolved into a forum that showcases cinematic work by local young filmmakers and video artists. Positive feedback from festival goers and industry partners led to the making of a second festival with expanded program initiatives. Films are screened at Innis Town Hall.

The festival screens a wide range of films, with themes and topics that reflect the diversity of Toronto such as cultural clashes, LGBTQ issues, pressures of urban living, influence from media, and issues on immigration and the cultural diaspora all from a youth perspective. They also showcase dramatic short films, documentaries and experimental works. Some previous works include adaptions of high-profile literary works such as The Highwayman and An Encounter.

== T24 Project ==
One of the festival's unique initiatives is the T24 Project, a 24-hour film challenge. Unlike other challenges similar in nature where teams are given props, locations and random lines of dialogue, the filmmakers of the T24 Project are given an essay-like question about the Toronto experience and participants are tasked in creating a 7- to 10-minute short thesis film in a 24-hour time frame.

In 2012, the festival ran the 4th edition of the T24 Project, tasking teams of filmmakers to create films based on the idea of how cinematic narratives, genres and forms can expose the myths and ideologies of an evolving cityscape such as Toronto. Fifteen teams registered, with twelve having completed a film and seven in competition for the festival's Visual Thesis Award.

== Jury ==
Every year, a jury made up of those in the film industry, such as programmers, award-winning filmmakers and film critics, determine the annual award and accolades for the festival. Previous members of the jury determining the awards include:

- Peter Sander, director of Academy Award-nominated film, The Selfish Giant
- Norman Wilner, film critic at Now Magazine and Vice President of the Toronto Film Critics Association
- Adam Trozzolo, Programmer at Movieola
- Janice Lee, award-winning filmmaker (2012 Toronto Film Critics Association Deluxe Award)
- Matt Guerin, writer and producer of The Golden Pin, winner of the Best Canadian Short Film at the Inside Out Film and Video Festival
- Richard Fung, Manager of the Regent Park Film Festival
