= Fire Song =

- Directed by: Adam Garnet Jones
- Written by: Adam Garnet Jones
- Produced by: P.J. Thornton; Laura Miliken; Michelle Derosier
- Starring: Andrew Martin; Harley LeGarde-Beacham; Jennifer Podemski; Derek Miller; Brendt Thomas Diabo; Shirley McLean
- Cinematography: James Kinistino
- Edited by: Michael Pierro
- Music by: David Arcus
- Release date: September 13, 2015 (TIFF)
- Running time: 96 minutes
- Country: Canada
- Language: English

Fire Song is a 2015 Canadian drama film, written and directed by Adam Garnet Jones.

== Plot ==
The film stars Andrew Martin as Shane, a gay aboriginal teenager. When his sister, Destiny, commits suicide just weeks before he is scheduled to leave his community to attend university, he is forced to wrestle with the decision of whether to follow his dreams or stay home to help support his family.

== Screenings and awards ==
The film premiered at the 2015 Toronto International Film Festival, and was screened as the closing night gala at the 2015 ImagineNATIVE Film + Media Arts Festival, where it won the Air Canada Audience Choice award. It also received the audience choice award for Best Narrative Feature at the Reelout Queer Film Festival, where it was featured as the opening gala in 2016, and was named both Best Film and Best Canadian Film at the Queer North Film Festival in 2016.

== Cast ==
- Andrew Martin as Shane - "Two-spirited"
- Jennifer Podemski as Jackie
- Harley LeGarde-Beacham as David
- Mary Galloway as Tara
- Brent Thomas Diabo as Kyle - Nephew
- Ma-Nee Chacaby as Evie
- Alexis LeGarde as Ashley
- Krysten Flett as Debbie - Drug dealer - Aunt
- Misty Dore as Roberta
- Derek Miller as Glen
- Shirley McLean as Janice

== See also ==
- List of lesbian, gay, bisexual or transgender-related films of 2015
