= The Pinco Triangle =

- Directed by: Patrick Crowe; Tristan R. Whiston
- Written by: Patrick Crowe; Tristan R. Whiston
- Produced by: Keith Clarkson
- Starring: Michael Fitzgerald; Lorraine Segato
- Cinematography: Yves Simard
- Edited by: Cathy Gulkin
- Music by: Alan Moon
- Production company: Upper Canada Moving Picture Company
- Release date: 1999
- Country: Canada
- Language: English

The Pinco Triangle is a Canadian documentary film, directed by Patrick Crowe and Tristan R. Whiston and released in 1999. A profile of LGBT life in Sudbury, Ontario, the film mixes interviews with past and present LGBT residents of the city with vignettes depicting aspects of the directors' own childhoods in the city, acted by a cast including Michael "Bitch Diva" Fitzgerald and Lorraine Segato. The film takes its name from blending the pink triangle, a common LGBT symbol, with the INCO Triangle, the former employee magazine of INCO's mining operations in Sudbury.

The interviewees included Michael Boyuk, a performer now associated with The B-Girlz drag comedy troupe, and Paulette Gagnon, an arts administrator who was previously profiled in the documentary film Mum's the Word (Maman et Ève) in 1996. The film's climax is a drag production number staged in front of the Big Nickel.

The directors started making the film in 1992, while Crowe was working for the National Film Board of Canada; it began when Crowe made a "pinco triangle" to carry with him at that year's Toronto Pride Parade, and conducted "person on the street" interviews with former Sudburians he met while displaying the symbol. Due to limited financing, the film was not fully completed until 1998.

== Distribution ==
The film premiered at BFI Flare in 1999. It also screened at the Hot Docs Canadian International Documentary Festival and the Inside Out Film and Video Festival in Toronto, and was a nominated finalist for Best Cultural Documentary at Hot Docs.

It also screened at the Vancouver International Film Festival and the Victoria Film Festival, where it won the award for Best Short Documentary.

The film received an anniversary screening at Sudbury's Queer North Film Festival in 2018, its first time ever screened in the city. In press interviews to promote the screening, Crowe drew a contrast between 1999, when nobody ever asked him why the film was not screening in Sudbury because the answer was self-evident, and 2018, when the environment for LGBT people both in Sudbury and across Canada has changed so much that people now regularly ask him why it did not. It won the festival's awards for Best in Show, Best Canadian Film and Best Northern Ontario Film.

== Critical response ==
The film has faced some criticism for its failure to expand on the stories of "Mother Brown" and "Popeye", two pioneers of Sudbury's gay community who had been mentioned in I Know a Place, a contemporaneous documentary film about gay history in Sault Ste. Marie.
