= Queer City Cinema =

LGBTQ film festival in Saskatchewan, Canada

Queer City Cinema is an annual film festival in Regina, Saskatchewan, which presents a program of LGBTQ film. Established in 1996 by Gary Varro, the festival was presented every two years at first before becoming an annual event. In recent years, the main festival has been presented concurrently with Performatorium, a festival of LGBTQ performance art.

In addition to the main event in Regina, the festival also presents a touring LGBTQ film minifestival presented in selected other cities across Canada, including Victoria, Yellowknife, Saskatoon, Winnipeg and Thunder Bay. The touring minifestival was organized for the first time in 2001.

== Controversies ==
In 2000, the event faced some controversy when the Saskatchewan Party criticized a government grant to the festival, on the grounds that some of the festival's content was allegedly pornographic. Although an anti-gay lobby group led by Christian evangelist Bill Whatcott picketed the festival that year, the festival took place without major incident. The 2001 launch of the touring festival was criticized in the House of Commons of Canada by Saskatoon MP Jim Pankiw, but was also staged without incident.

== See also ==
- List of LGBT film festivals
- List of film festivals in Canada
