= Lisa Wegner =

Canadian actor and film producer

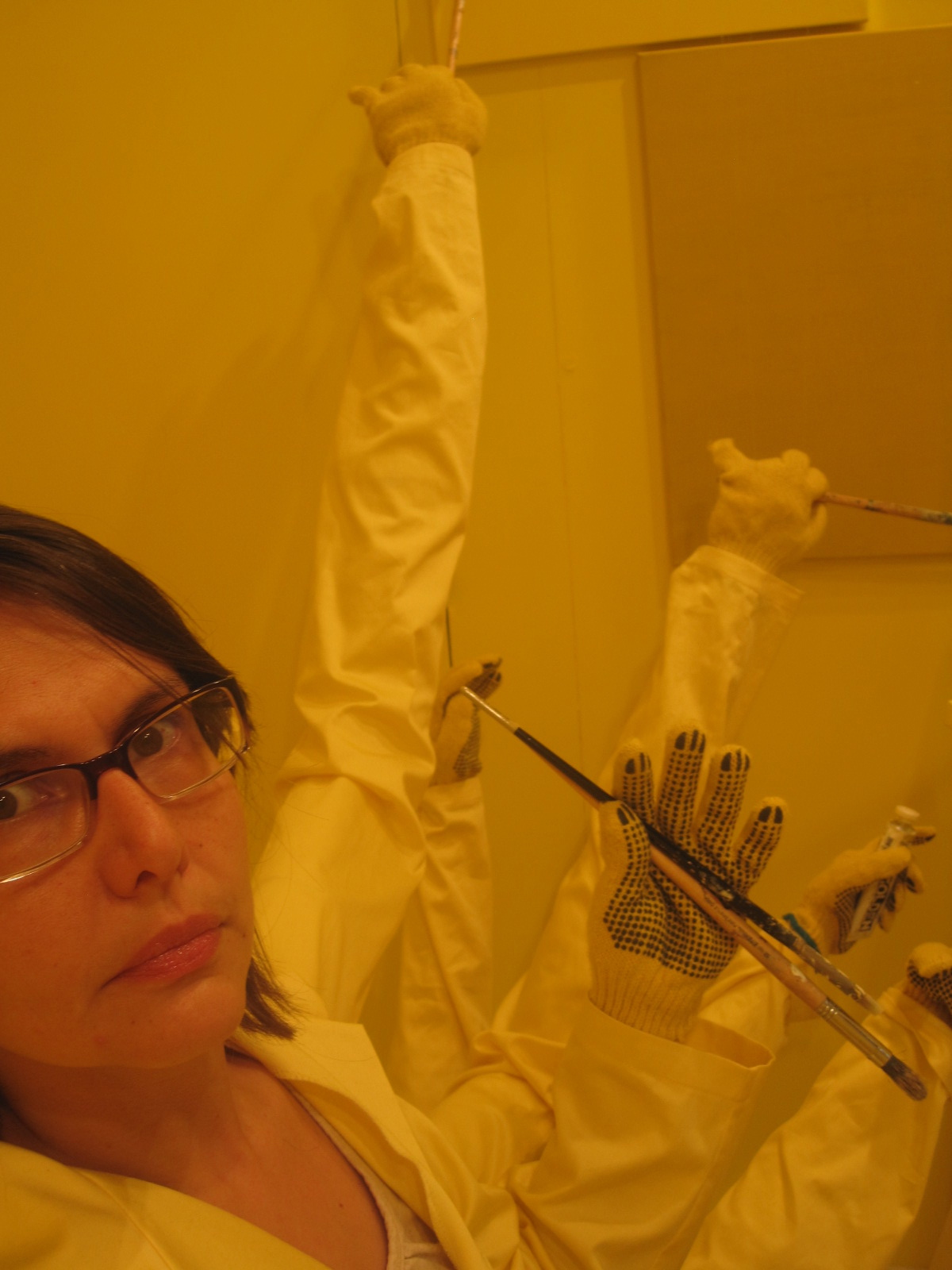
- Lisa Anita Wegner in Ken Monkman's The Art Game, 2011
- Born: Toronto, Ontario, Canada
- Other names: Lisa Anita Wegner
- Occupation: Filmmaker Artist Performer
- Website: www.mightybraveproductions.com

Lisa Wegner is a Canadian actress, filmmaker, performance artist, producer, film programmer and installation artist. She has been nominated twice for Canadian Comedy Awards for "best actress" in films she produced. Her film production company is Mighty Brave Productions. In 2005 she ran Zebra Pictures, a commercial production based in Toronto, Ontario. Since a brain injury in 2008 she has been working in installation art, curating for Gallery1313, programming for the Regent Park Film Festival and mentoring various interns in art and film. In 2014 Lisa played The Agent in Will Kwan's triptych film Hammer Nail, commissioned for Toronto Reel Asian International Film Festival.
