= OUTeast Film Festival =

LGBTQ film festival in Nova Scotia, Canada

The OUTEast Film Festival is an annual film festival in Halifax, Nova Scotia, which programs a lineup of LGBT-related films. Launched in 2012, the event is staged in June of each year at a variety of venues, including the Nova Scotia Museum of Natural History and the Halifax Central Library.

Andria Wilson, one of the founders of the festival, became director of the Inside Out Film and Video Festival in Toronto, Ontario, in 2016.

The last iteration of the festival happened from June 15th to June 17th, 2018.

== See also ==
- List of LGBT film festivals
- List of film festivals in Canada
