= Suicide Kale =

2016 film by Carly Usdin

- Official movie poster
- Directed by: Carly Usdin
- Written by: Brittani Nichols
- Produced by: Brittani Nichols; Jasika Nicole; Robin Roemer; Carly Usdin
- Starring: Brianna Baker; Lindsay Hicks; Brittani Nichols; Jasika Nicole
- Cinematography: Robin Roemer
- Edited by: Carly Usdin
- Production companies: Nichols and Dimes Entertainment; Scheme Machine Studios
- Release date: April 3, 2016
- Running time: 78 minutes
- Country: United States
- Language: English

Suicide Kale is a 2016 American dark comedy film, directed by Carly Usdin and written by Brittani Nichols. The film centers on Jasmine (Brittani Nichols) and Penn (Lindsay Hicks), a lesbian couple who unexpectedly find a hidden suicide note in the home of their friends Billie (Jasika Nicole) and Jordan (Brianna Baker). The film premiered at the Queer Hippo International LGBT Film Festival in Houston, Texas on April 3, 2016. Usdin won the Audience Award for Best First U.S. Dramatic Feature at 2016 Outfest.

== Synopsis ==
Jasmine (Brittani Nichols) and Penn (Lindsay Hicks), a couple who have been dating for a month, go to a dinner party hosted by their friends Billie (Jasika Nicole) and Jordan (Brianna Baker), who have been married for five years. When they arrive, they find that Billie and Jordan are having frequent disagreements and seem to be in the middle of some sort of conflict. At one point during dinner, Jasmine and Penn leave the room under the guise of using the bathroom and go into their hosts' bedroom to have sex. There they inadvertently find a note that seems to indicate that the writer is going to commit suicide. Jasmine and Penn are unsure of what to do and argue about how to handle the situation; they then return to the dinner table. The meal is later interrupted by the next door neighbor, Xo (Hayley Huntley) with whom Jordan had a brief affair, coming over to confront her. It comes to light that the neighbor wrote the note.

== Cast ==
- Brittani Nichols as Jasmine
- Lindsay Hicks as Penn
- Hayley Huntley as Xo
- Jasika Nicole as Billie
- Brianna Baker as Jordan

== Production ==
Nichols wrote the script for Suicide Kale, which was her first screenplay for a feature-length film. She and the film's director and editor, Usdin, had no budget for the film and had to use equipment that they owned. It was filmed over the course of a few days using natural light in co-star Brianna Baker's house. Robin Roemer, Usdin's wife, was the cinematographer and executive producer. Co-star Jasika Nicole was also an executive producer. The entire production team were queer women.

=== Release ===
Suicide Kale premiered at the Queer Hippo International LGBT Film Festival on April 3, 2016. The film screened at Outfest on July 15, 2016,

== Critical reception ==
The film received positive critical reviews. Writing for SBS, Glenn Dunks wrote, "Its characters are the kind that are rarely seen on screen, interacting in ways that more mainstream (and, let’s face it, straight) filmmakers wouldn’t ever allow. Its central mystery is resolved in a way that makes sense for this little world they’ve made and there is even a blooper reel at the end." Daniela Costa wrote in a review for AfterEllen, "It helps that all four characters have unique and interesting personalities that stand up on their own. You believe them as people and, in spite of their very obvious flaws, you like them."

== Accolades ==
- Outfest – Audience Award for Best First U.S. Dramatic Feature
- Queer North Film Festival – Best Women's Film
- NewFest – Audience Award for Outstanding Feature Film
- North Louisiana Gay & Lesbian Film Festival – Best Comedy
