= Out North Queer Film Festival =

LGBTQ film festival in Yukon, Canada

The Out North Queer Film Festival is an annual LGBT film festival in Whitehorse, Yukon. Launched in 2012 by the Yukon Queer Film Alliance, the festival presents an annual program of LGBT films each fall.

The event is staged at the Yukon Beringia Interpretive Centre.

In addition to the main film festival, selected films are also screened at other times during the year in Whitehorse, as well as Dawson City, Faro and Haines Junction.

== See also ==
- List of LGBT film festivals
- List of film festivals in Canada
