= Cinéfranco =

Film festival in Toronto, Ontario, Canada

Cinéfranco is an annual film festival in Toronto, Ontario, Canada, which presents a weeklong program of both Canadian and international French language films.

== History ==
The festival was established in 1997 by Marcelle Lean, a former chair of the Ontario Film Development Corporation, and was staged for the first time in February 1998. Lean remained the event's executive director as of 2015.

Unlike larger events such as the Toronto International Film Festival, all films throughout the week were screened in a single theatre venue. To establish broader audience appeal beyond the city's francophone community alone, all films were screened with English language subtitles.

Separately from the main festival, an annual youth program of films for children and teenagers is also staged each year. The separate youth program was launched for the first time in 2007.

The festival presented an annual award, the Radio-Canada Audience Award, to the film voted by festival attendees as the best film in that year's program. TFO also formerly sponsored an award for the most popular film in the youth program.

In 2015, Lean told L'Express de Toronto that the festival was in financial trouble and may be forced to cease operations if it could not renegotiate its operational support and sponsorship agreements. The main festival was initially cancelled in 2016, although the youth program was still staged; instead, Tournée Québec Cinéma, a program of Québec Cinéma which presents a touring minifestival of Quebec films in various locations across Canada, added an event in Toronto to its schedule. The event was later revived, however, with a smaller-scale Cinéfranco presented in October 2016 at the Alliance Française de Toronto.

== Audience Award ==
- 2009: Paris, Cédric Klapisch
- 2010: Female Agents (Les Femmes de l'ombre), Jean-Paul Salomé
- 2011: Bacon on the Side (Il reste du jambon?), Anne Depétrini
- 2012: Free Men (Les Hommes libres), Ismaël Ferroukhi
- 2013: What's in a Name? (Le Prénom), Matthieu Delaporte and Alexandre de La Patellière
- 2014: The Gilded Cage (La Cage dorée), Ruben Alves
- 2015: Once in a Lifetime (Les Héritiers), Marie-Castille Mention-Schaar
- 2016–2017: No award presented
- 2018: 1991, Ricardo Trogi
- 2019: Fahim, Pierre-François Martin-Laval
- 2020: Spread Your Wings (Donne-moi des ailes), Nicolas Vanier
- 2021: The Rose Maker (La Fine fleur), Pierre Pinaud
- 2022: Farewell Mr. Haffmann (Adieu monsieur Haffmann), Fred Cavayé
- 2023: The Book of Solutions (Le Livre des solutions), Michel Gondry
- 2024: Abbé Pierre: A Century of Devotion (L'Abbé Pierre – Une vie de combats), Frédéric Tellier

== Youth Film Award ==
- 2009: The Necessities of Life (Ce qu'il faut pour vivre), Benoît Pilon
- 2010: Little Nicholas (Le Petit Nicolas), Laurent Tirard
- 2011: Trouble at Timpetill (Les Enfants de Timpelbach), Nicolas Bary
- 2012: War of the Buttons (La Guerre des boutons), Yann Samuell
- 2013: The Day of the Crows (Le Jour des corneilles), Jean-Christophe Dessaint
- 2014: Belle and Sebastian (Belle et Sébastien), Nicolas Vanier
- 2015: The Nightingale (Le Promeneur d'oiseau), Philippe Muyl
- 2016: April and the Extraordinary World (Avril et le Monde truqué), Christian Desmares and Franck Ekinci
- 2017: The African Doctor (Bienvenue à Marly-Gomont), Julien Rambaldi
- 2018: The Big Bad Fox and Other Tales... (Le Grand Méchant Renard et autres contes...), Benjamin Renner and Patrick Imbert
- 2019: Dilili in Paris (Dilili à Paris), Michel Ocelot
- 2020: Remi, Nobody's Boy (Rémi sans famille), Antoine Blossier
- 2021: The Wolf and the Lion (Le Loup et le Lion), Gilles de Maistre
- 2022: King, David Moreau
- 2023: Belle and Sebastian: Next Generation (Belle et Sébastien: Nouvelle génération), Pierre Coré
