= Tournée Québec Cinéma =

Annual traveling film festival in Canada

The Tournée Québec Cinéma is an annual touring film festival, organized by Québec Cinéma to promote and distribute French language films from Quebec in cities in English Canada where such films would not ordinarily receive theatrical distribution.

In some cities the event is staged as a standalone festival, while in others the organization partners with an established local francophone or international film festival to present a selection of Quebec films within the other festival's program. Standalone events are currently staged in Kelowna, Nelson and Victoria, British Columbia; Caraquet and Moncton, New Brunswick; St. John's, Newfoundland and Labrador; Argyle, Church Point, Greenwood and Halifax, Nova Scotia; Iqaluit, Nunavut; and Charlottetown, North Rustico, Souris and Summerside, Prince Edward Island, while partnerships are in place with Cinéfranco in Toronto, the Festival Objectif Cinéma in Ottawa, Cinémental in Winnipeg, the Rendez-Vous French Film Festival in Vancouver and the Available Light Film Festival in Whitehorse.

The event is considered a qualifying festival for the Canadian Screen Awards.
