= Ottawa Black Film Festival =

The Ottawa Black Film Festival is an annual film festival in Ottawa, Ontario, which festival programs a selection of African, Caribbean, African American and Black Canadian films.

The festival was launched in 2021 as an outgrowth of the Montreal International Black Film Festival, which was created by actress and filmmaker Fabienne Colas. Due to the COVID-19 pandemic in Canada, the inaugural event was staged online.

Films screened at the inaugural event included The Special, Black Boys, John Ware Reclaimed, Stateless and Dope is Death.
