= Québec Cinéma =

Canadian organization based in Quebec

Québec Cinéma is a Canadian organization based in Quebec, whose mission is to promote and develop the Cinema of Quebec.

The organization's programs include the Prix Iris, the annual film awards for Quebec films; the Rendez-vous Québec Cinéma, an annual film festival; the Lab Québec Cinéma, which works with schools to facilitate the use of Quebec films in educational contexts; and Tournée Québec Cinéma, which presents an annual touring minifestival of Quebec films in English Canadian cities where French-language films from Quebec would not otherwise receive theatrical distribution. The organization is also a sponsor of the Prix collégial du cinéma québécois, an educational program which engages film studies students in the province's CEGEPs to present an annual film award.

In December 2018, the organization announced a partnership with Netflix to launch Talent Lab, a professional development program for people entering the film industry.
