= Yellowknife International Film Festival =

The Yellowknife International Film Festival is an annual film festival, which takes place in Yellowknife, Northwest Territories, Canada. The festival presents a lineup of Canadian and international films, with a special but not exclusive focus on films produced within the Northwest Territories.

In addition to film screenings, the festival also stages an annual pitch competition for aspiring film and television creators to seek funding for their projects. The 2020 competition was won by Curlfriends, a pilot for a comedy series about a curling team.
