= Sudbury Outdoor Adventure Reels Film Festival =

The Sudbury Outdoor Adventure Reels Film Festival is an annual film festival, launched in Greater Sudbury, Ontario in 2021. A partnership of the Sudbury Indie Cinema Co-op and Laurentian University's program in outdoor adventure leadership, the festival presents a selection of local and international films on outdoor and wilderness adventure and travel.

== History ==
The festival was launched after the Banff Mountain Film Festival, whose annual national touring circuit of films about outdoor sport and adventure had included a stop at Laurentian University for many years, cancelled its 2020 tour due to the COVID-19 pandemic in Canada. In response, ADVL coordinator Jim Little contacted the Sudbury Indie Cinema Coop to collaborate on launching their own new festival; Sudbury Indie Cinema director Beth Mairs had also previously been the owner of Wild Women Expeditions, an operator of outdoor adventure tourism programs for women.

The inaugural festival had originally been planned for early 2021, although its launch was ultimately delayed until October. Films screened at the inaugural edition included The Wall of Shadows, Home: The Outward Journey Inward, Cholitas, On Falling, North of Nightfall, Bear-Like and The Rescue, as well as a program of short films.
