= Brittani Nichols =

American comedian and actress

- Born: Chicago, Illinois, U.S.
- Education: Yale University (BA)
- Occupations: Actor, writer, producer
- Years active: 2012–present
- Notable work: Suicide Kale (2016)

Brittani Nichols (born June 20, 1988) is an American producer, actress, comedian, and writer. In 2016, Nichols wrote, produced, and starred in the film Suicide Kale, which won the Audience Award for Best U.S. Dramatic Feature at 2016 Outfest. She has written for the television programs A Black Lady Sketch Show, Take My Wife, Strangers, and Drop the Mic. Nichols is a writer and producer for Abbott Elementary and won the Outstanding Writing in a Comedy Series award at the 54th NAACP Image Awards for the episode "Student Transfer". As part of the producing team of Abbott Elementary, Nichols was nominated for an Emmy Award for Outstanding Comedy Series in 2023 and 2024.

== Career ==
=== Television and film ===
Nichols moved to Los Angeles after college and developed the web series Words With Girls (2012), which she later rewrote as a full-length pilot that was produced by Issa Rae and Deniese Davis's initiative ColorCreative.tv. The series centered a group of queer twenty-something roommates in LA and starred Nichols, Corbin Reid, Hannah Hart, Alex Sturman, and Lauren Neal.

In 2016, Nichols wrote, produced, and starred in Suicide Kale, a dark comedy with an all queer-woman cast. Nichols stated in an interview that she set out to make a lesbian movie that "wasn’t about coming out, sleeping with a man, or a character death at the end". Both Words with Girls and Suicide Kale draw on Nichols' own experiences as a lesbian, and she has stated repeatedly in interviews that she is committed to increasing LGBTQ and African-American representation in media. Suicide Kale won the Audience Award for Best U.S. Dramatic Feature at Outfest.

She has appeared in several television programs including A Black Lady Sketch Show, Take My Wife, and Transparent. Nichols was a writer for season one of the HBO series A Black Lady Sketch Show. She has also written for Strangers, Drop the Mic, and Take My Wife. She served as consulting producer for The Circle and Getting Curious with Jonathan Van Ness.

In 2020, it was announced that Nichols would produce a dramedy, Toothbrush, for Quibi through ColorCreative; however Quibi went out of business before the show was created.

She is a writer and producer for the ABC comedy Abbott Elementary. Nichols signed with CAA in 2022.

=== Other work ===
In 2016, she released a five-track EP, Brittani Nichols Likes You. Nichols previously co-hosted two podcasts, Brand New Podcast with Ariana Lenarsky, and Hamilton the Podcast with Khalehla Rixon. Nichols also is a Captain for Writers Guild of America West and spoke on behalf of members during the 2023 writers strike.

== Personal life ==
Nichols was born in Chicago. After attending Thornwood High School, she attended Yale University, where she played on the women's basketball team and women's rugby team.

She is gay and genderqueer. She supported Hugo Soto-Martinez and Eunisses Hernandez during the 2022 Los Angeles elections.

== Accolades ==
- 2024 – Out100, Storytellers

== Filmography ==
=== Acting ===
Year	Title	Role	Notes
2012	Words with Girls	Brittani	5 episodes
2013	Unicorn Plan-It	Random Sleeper	Episode: "Across the YOUniverse"
2015	Transparent	Nicol	3 episodes
2016	Suicide Kale	Jasmine Rawlings	Also writer
2016	The Fat One	Reese	Episode: "Not Hungry"
2017	Rad Lands	Farmer Knox	Episode: "Big"
2018	Take My Wife	Bethani	2 episodes
2019	A Black Lady Sketch Show	Barbecue Daddy #2 / Ex	2 episodes

=== Writer ===
Year	Title	Notes
2012	Words with Girls	6 episodes
2015	The Xperiment	26 episodes
2016	Suicide Kale	Also actress
2017	Drop the Mic	6 episodes
2018	Take My Wife	5 episodes
2018	Strangers	Episode: "First Skate"
2019	A Black Lady Sketch Show	6 episodes
2022-25	Abbott Elementary	5 episodes

== See also ==
- List of lesbian filmmakers
