= Cinémental =

Film festival in Winnipeg, Manitoba, Canada

Cinémental is a film festival, staged annually in Winnipeg, Manitoba.

The event, which presents an annual program of Canadian and international French language films for the Franco-Manitoban community, takes place primarily at the Franco-Manitoban Cultural Centre in the city's Saint Boniface district, although some screenings and events are also sometimes held at other venues in the city. In order to ensure that non-francophones are also welcome and able to attend, the festival presents the majority of its films in subtitled form.

Launched in 1991, the event is staged partially in collaboration with Tournée Québec Cinéma. In 2016, the festival was given a special tribute in honour of its 25th anniversary at the Rendez-vous Québec Cinéma festival in Montreal.

The 2020 festival proceeded normally despite the COVID-19 pandemic in Canada, although social distancing restrictions were maintained for audience safety. Earlier in the summer, the festival also collaborated with the Economic Development Council for Manitoba Bilingual Municipalities to present Cinéma sous les étoiles, an outdoor film screening series at the Saint Boniface Cathedral.
