= Montreal International Black Film Festival =

Canadian film festival

The Montreal International Black Film Festival is an annual film festival in Montreal, Quebec, Canada. Held in September each year, the festival programs a selection of African, Caribbean, African American and Black Canadian films.

The event was launched by Fabienne Colas in 2005 as the Haitian Film Festival, with a focus specifically on films from Haiti. It was renamed to the Montreal International Black Film Festival in 2010, expanding its focus to include international films from the entire African diaspora. In 2013, Colas also launched the sibling Toronto Black Film Festival in Toronto, Ontario, and she has since launched the Halifax Black Film Festival and the Ottawa Black Film Festival.

Due to the COVID-19 pandemic in Canada, the 2020 festival was presented entirely online. It attracted over 300,000 viewers during the course of the event, approximately 20 times the normal attendance of the in-person festival.
