= Junction North International Documentary Film Festival =

The Junction North International Documentary Film Festival is an annual documentary film festival in Greater Sudbury, Ontario. The event is staged by the Sudbury Indie Cinema Co-op, which also organizes the city's Queer North Film Festival.

The event was launched in 2013 as Best of Hot Docs, a satellite of the Hot Docs Canadian International Documentary Festival in Toronto. It was renamed to the Junction North International Documentary Film Festival in 2017, enabling it to establish an independent identity and to access arts grant funding. In 2019, the event was staged for the first time at the Sudbury Indie Cinema Coop's new permanent venue on Mackenzie Street.

The event is a qualifying festival for the Canadian Screen Awards.
