= Oakville Festivals of Film and Art =

Not-for-profit organization

The Oakville Festivals of Film and Art (OFFA) is a not-for-profit organization that runs the Oakville Film Festival, as well as special screening and Arts events such as an Annual Screening series and annual screening and performing event for International Women's Day. The festival celebrated its 12th year in 2025, and has been held the third week of June every year for over 12 years. The festival includes a juried award competition with senior members of the Canadian film and production communities, and Audience Choice Awards for the best feature and best short film. The festival uses Film Freeway for its submissions, which are open 1st November every year, and has a track record of programming over 70% of submissions from the platform. The festival screens its films at three primary venues in Oakville: Film.ca Cinemas, The Five Drive In, and the Oakville Centre for the Performing Arts. For 2025, OFFA expanded into Mississauga, hosting a full day of screenings at Cineplex Square One, Mississauga. For 2026, the festival will host a full day of programming in Burlington.

The festival is a Canadian Screen Award Qualifying Event. An Industry Summit for the Canadian Film Industry and local filmmakers is held every year in conjunction with the festival, but during the pandemic, this became a year-round event that features live and virtual industry workshops/panels, which provide professional development for the filmmaking community. To date, the festival has attracted over 25,000 event participants, screened almost 700 films, and attracted over 1000 industry guests.

For 2023, the festival hosted a hybrid festival that featured a full week of screenings with over 100 films, many of which were available live and virtually. In addition, thanks to a Trillium Resilient Communities fund grant, the festival was able to livestream all of its events, Q&As, and performances for its 2023 event. The 2023 festival launched on National Indigenous Peoples Day, June 21, 2023, with a special event at the Five-Drive In, partnering with Halton Organizations Grandmother’s Voice, the Five Drive In, and 101 Deweguns. This special event highlighted the local and national Indigenous communities featuring film, drumming, dancing, and a traditional Indigenous opening ceremony, as well as sports such as Lacrosse, and Beach Volleyball that attracted audiences from across the region of Halton/Peel. The event featured the Canadian Premiere of the Beehive, a sci-fi thriller written and directed by Vancouver-based, Red River Metis filmmaker, Alexander Lasheras. The event was attended by Alexander, actors Meadow Kingfisher (Rosemary), Kaydin Gibson (played Aaron) as well as producers Mike Johnston and Arun Fryer, originally from OFFA hometown Oakville. The Thursday night GALA featured a special evening which included the Eastern Canadian Theatrical Premiere of Rob Grabow’s 2022 hit film The Year of the Dog, (which has a 100% rating on Rotten Tomatoes) with Writer/Director and lead actor Rob (who plays Matt) in attendance, as well as Actor Allyson Groenig (who played Julie). As well to launch Pride Weekend, OFFA's 2023 popular Friday Canadian Gala featured the Canadian Theatrical Premiere of the Alberta 2023 film, Polarized, from Director/Writer Shamim Sarif, The event was attended by Sarif, Producer Hanan Kattan and actors Holly Deveaux and Maxine Denis. It was preceded with a performance by singer/songwriter Brooke Palsson, who wrote and performed much of the music for the film. The 2023 festival also featured the regional Premiere of the 2022 documentary, Lancaster, with a live, zoom Q&A with Directors David Fairfield and Ant Palmer, which along with four other screenings including Matt Johnson’s critically-acclaimed hit film, Blackberry, attended by writer Matt Miller, was sold out.

The Sheridan Alumni/Film.ca annual screening series featured many regional premieres of award-winning films, including the regional Premieres of North of Normal, a screening of the Canadian Screen award winner, I Like Movies with Writer/Director Chandler Levack in attendance, as well as an exclusive pre-release screening of Director Sarah Polley’s Academy-Award Winning film. Women Talking, attended by Canadian Actor Michelle McLeod (who plays Mejal in the film) plus several Sheridan Alumni who worked on the film. All screenings were attended by Sheridan alumni who worked on the films.

2022 marked a return to a hybrid festival following 2 fully virtual events due to the Covid 19 pandemic, with live events, and most films were available both live and on the festivals eventive platform. The festival hosted three gala events, including a Saturday night Fundraiser for Unite with Ukraine, that managed to raise thousands of dollars for the Ukrainian World Congress, while attracting films and filmmakers from around the world including Florida, England, Ireland, and British Columbia. In 2021, OFFA achieved a huge online presence, attracting over 5,000 people to its online screening platform, as well as live screenings at the local Indie cinema and Drive In Theatre, screening over 100 films from Canada and all over the world. As early as 2020, the festival has increased its reach to audiences and filmmakers substantially by doing hybrid digital/live screening events. The 2020 year featured the Canadian theatrical Premiere of The Cuban at The Five Drive In in Oakville, as well as many more Canadian and World Premieres. Over 70% of the films screened are Canadian and the festival has a reputation for screening the work of local filmmakers from the area, but also of attracting filmmakers from around the world to its June Festival. The 7th edition of the festival featured 21 feature films and documentaries, over 42 short films, 3 events, (including a screening of I’m Going to Break Your Heart and a special concert with Canadian Performers Chantal Kreviazuk and Raine Maida, as well as 2 days of interactive industry sessions. The event attracted a record number of filmmakers and industry guests and featured record audiences.

After being almost completely virtual during the pandemic, the festival returned to live events in 2022 with 21 feature films and documentaries, and 92 short films, most available both live at film.ca cinemas in Oakville as well as on a virtual screening platform. A highlight of the 2022 festival was An Evening to Celebrate Ukrainian Arts and Culture, featuring Chantal Kreviazuk in support of the Ukrainian World Foundation. The event featured dancers from the Mississauga-based Barvinok Dance School, as well as a screening of The Earth if Blue as an Orange by Ukrainian filmmaker Iryna Tsilyk.

The pre-pandemic 7th edition of the festival featured 21 feature films and documentaries, over 42 short films, 3 events, (including a screening of I'm Going to Break Your Heart and a special concert with Canadian performers Chantal Kreviazuk and Raine Maida. As well as 2 days of interactive industry sessions. The event attracted a record number of filmmakers and industry guests and featured record audiences.

== History ==
Founded in 2014 by Oakville residents Wendy Donnan, Judah Hernandez and Stephanie Colebrook, Oakville Festivals of Film and Art is going into its 8th year in 2021. OFFA and OFFA Online is a community-oriented festival. They aim to bring the best documentaries, features and short films to cinephiles in Southern Ontario. Each year, in late June, OFFA hosts the Oakville Film Festival which is Oakville's only independent film festival. The festival has grown in stature and length, having gone from a 3 day event in 2017 to a 7 day virtual event in 2021 and a 7 day hybrid event for 2022.

== General Information ==
The Oakville Film Festival, run by Oakville Festivals of Film and Art, presents feature films, shorts and documentaries of famous and award-winning auteurs, as well as the works of local Canadian filmmakers both new and experienced.

OFFA showcases feature-length productions, including documentaries, and short films, many coming from Oakville or surrounding communities. OFFA organizes special screening series to raise money, and awareness, for local organizations with which OFFA collaborates on programming.

OFFA works with other non-profit organizations for their events and presentations.

== Mission ==
OFFA aims to:

- Produce outstanding events and initiatives
- Present thought-provoking productions that explore relevant social issues
- Incentivize the development and growth of the local film and art industry
- Gather a enlightened, supportive and analytical audience where new artists may showcase their art

== Film competitions and awards ==
Film Awards (Jury and Audience Choice Awards)

- Best Canadian Feature Film
- Best Feature Film
- Best Documentary
- Best International Short film
- Best Canadian Short film
- Best Director
- Best Canadian Director
- Best Indigenous Film
- Best Student Film
- Honorable mentions for actors
- Audience Choice Awards for best Feature and best short film (Audience Vote)
