= Regina International Film Festival =

Annual Canadian film festival

- Founded: 2015
- Founded by: John Thimothy
- Language: International
- Website: riffa.ca

The Regina International Film Festival and Awards (RIFFA) is an annual Canadian film festival, staged in Regina, Saskatchewan. RIFFA is considered the largest film festival in Saskatchewan and has also been referred to as “The People's Festival of Canada”, a phrase highlighting its identity rooted in inclusivity, accessibility, and community wellbeing.

Founded by Indo-Canadian filmmaker John Thimothy, the event was launched in 2015, focused on short films in its first year. It was not held in 2016, with its second iteration taking place in 2017, but has been staged annually since then and has expanded to include feature films.

The festival also presents an annual program of awards to the films deemed to be the best in that year's festival.

In 2022, the festival was recognized as a Canadian Screen Award Qualifying Festival by the Academy of Canadian Cinema & Television, which allows films screened at the festival to be nominated for the Canadian Screen Awards.

== Festival format and programming ==
The festival typically takes place in August, with six days of online screenings followed by five days of in-person events, culminating in an awards ceremony. Screenings are held at venues such as the RCMP Heritage Centre, MacKenzie Art Gallery, and Darke Hall. RIFFA programs films across different categories, including:

- Canadian Feature
- International Feature
- Documentary Feature
- Indigenous Short Film
- Saskatchewan Short Film
- Animated and Student Shorts

In 2025, RIFFA received over 400 submissions from 74 countries, ultimately selecting 103 films. Since 2015, the festival has presented over 1,000 films in 187 languages, from 93 countries. This list includes 303 directorial debuts and works by 268 female directors, in addition to Indigenous, LGBTQ+ and immigrant filmmakers.

== Awards and recognition ==
RIFFA presents awards in multiple categories, recognizing storytelling and social impact. In 2018, the festival introduced a gender-neutral trophy and logo.

== Notable films and filmmakers ==
RIFFA has showcased a wide range of acclaimed films, including:

- The Strangers’ Case: a refugee drama that premiered at the Berlin International Film Festival and won the Amnesty International Award
- Analogue Revolution: How Feminist Media Changed the World – a Canadian documentary exploring feminist media history
- Look At Me and Daughter of the Sun: standout Canadian features from recent editions
- Short films like Still Here/Immerdar, Fear and Trembling, and Ninja Grandma also received critical acclaim and audience recognition.

== Community impact and initiatives ==
RIFFA is operated by the Regina International Film Festival and Wards Foundation Inc., a non-profit organization dedicated to promoting cinematic arts and social change. The festival supports mental health advocacy, youth education, and marginalized voices through initiatives such as:

- The LOOK Program: a creative platform for individuals living with mental health challenges to express themselves through filmmaking.
- RIFFA Academy: the educational component of the festival.
- RIFFA Foundation Gala: a fundraising and networking event supporting RIFFA foundations charitable & educational programming.
- RIFFA Industry and Network Series: professional development events for filmmakers and creatives.
- RIFFA Virtual Gateway Program.

RIFFA also plays a key role in nurturing Saskatchewan's film culture year-round.
