= Corona (film) =

2020 Canadian thriller drama film written and directed by Mostafa Keshvari

- Promotional release poster
- Directed by: Mostafa Keshvari
- Written by: Mostafa Keshvari
- Starring: Andrea Stefancikova; Emy Aneke; Andy Canete; Zarina Sterling; Josh Blacker; Richard Lett; Traei Tsai
- Distributed by: Level 33 Entertainment
- Release date: August 8, 2020 (Rhode Island Film Festival)
- Country: Canada
- Language: English

Corona, also known as Corona: Fear Is a Virus, is a 2020 Canadian thriller drama film about a group of people stuck in an elevator during the COVID-19 pandemic. The film was written and directed by Mostafa Keshvari, and made in part to address xenophobia and racism related to the COVID-19 pandemic.

Corona was filmed in one shot using a handheld camera.

== Premise ==
Corona follows six unlikely neighbors stranded in their building's elevator at the first stages of the COVID-19 crisis. They quickly suspect a seventh neighbor, a Chinese newcomer played by Traei Tsai, of having the coronavirus and likely to infect them after she also boards the elevator.

— The Hollywood Reporter

Fear and panic ensue when a woman coughs in an elevator during the COVID-19 pandemic.

== Cast ==
- Andrea Stefancikova
- Emy Aneke
- Andy Canete
- Zarina Sterling
- Josh Blacker
- Richard Lett
- Traei Tsai

== Development ==
Mostafa Keshvari came up with the idea to film Corona after reading headlines on the COVID-19 virus. The news reported that Asian communities in Canada were experiencing multiple xenophobic and racist incidents due to the association of COVID-19 with China. Keshvari has stated that at the time “nobody thought a white person could get it. But the virus doesn’t discriminate.” Keshvari wrote an informal script during a two-week period in January 2020. A space was rented and a set built, which took ten days. The cast and crew were people that Keshvari knew already or were hired through word of mouth. Actress Andrea Stefancikova, who also helped cast the movie, "wanted to cast diverse people who reflect how Vancouver looks".

Corona was shot in one shot using a handheld camera during early 2020 and the actors were allowed to improvise on the script. According to an interview with Vancouver Magazine, the film was shot twenty times before it was successfully completed. Filming was completed prior to Canada and other countries going on lockdown and Keshvari submitted the completed movie to film festivals, which were cancelled due to the shutdown.

== Release ==
Corona was initially intended to release to film festivals; this was unsuccessful due to festivals cancelling due to lockdown orders and concerns of spreading the coronavirus in their respective countries. News outlets such as The Hollywood Reporter reported on the film and its trailer prior to its release, crediting it as the "first COVID-19 movie". The Deseret News was critical of the trailer for the then unreleased movie, as they felt that it "looks a bit like it could have been made in iMovie, as it uses recognizable and somewhat amateur looking fonts." The Guardian's Charles Bramesco expressed concern about Corona and similar films utilizing the pandemic as a plot point, asking if it was too soon for filmmakers to do so.

The film premiered at the 2020 Rhode Island Film Festival, where it won the RIIFF Director's Choice Award.

== See also ==
- Impact of the COVID-19 pandemic on cinema
- Corona Zombies
- Coronavirus (india film)
- Songbird
