= Halifax Black Film Festival =

Film festival in Nova Scotia, Canada

The Halifax Black Film Festival is an annual film festival in Halifax, Nova Scotia. Held in late February or early March each year, the festival programs a selection of African, Caribbean, African American and Black Canadian films.

The festival was launched in 2017 by Fabienne Colas. Due to the COVID-19 pandemic the festival was staged online in 2021 and 2022, before returning to theatres in 2023.

The festival's projects have included Being Black in Halifax, a program which commissions short films by emerging black filmmakers from Halifax, screening them in a dedicated program at the festival before they are aired on CBC Television as a documentary series.
