= Fabienne Colas =

Haitian-Canadian actress, director and producer

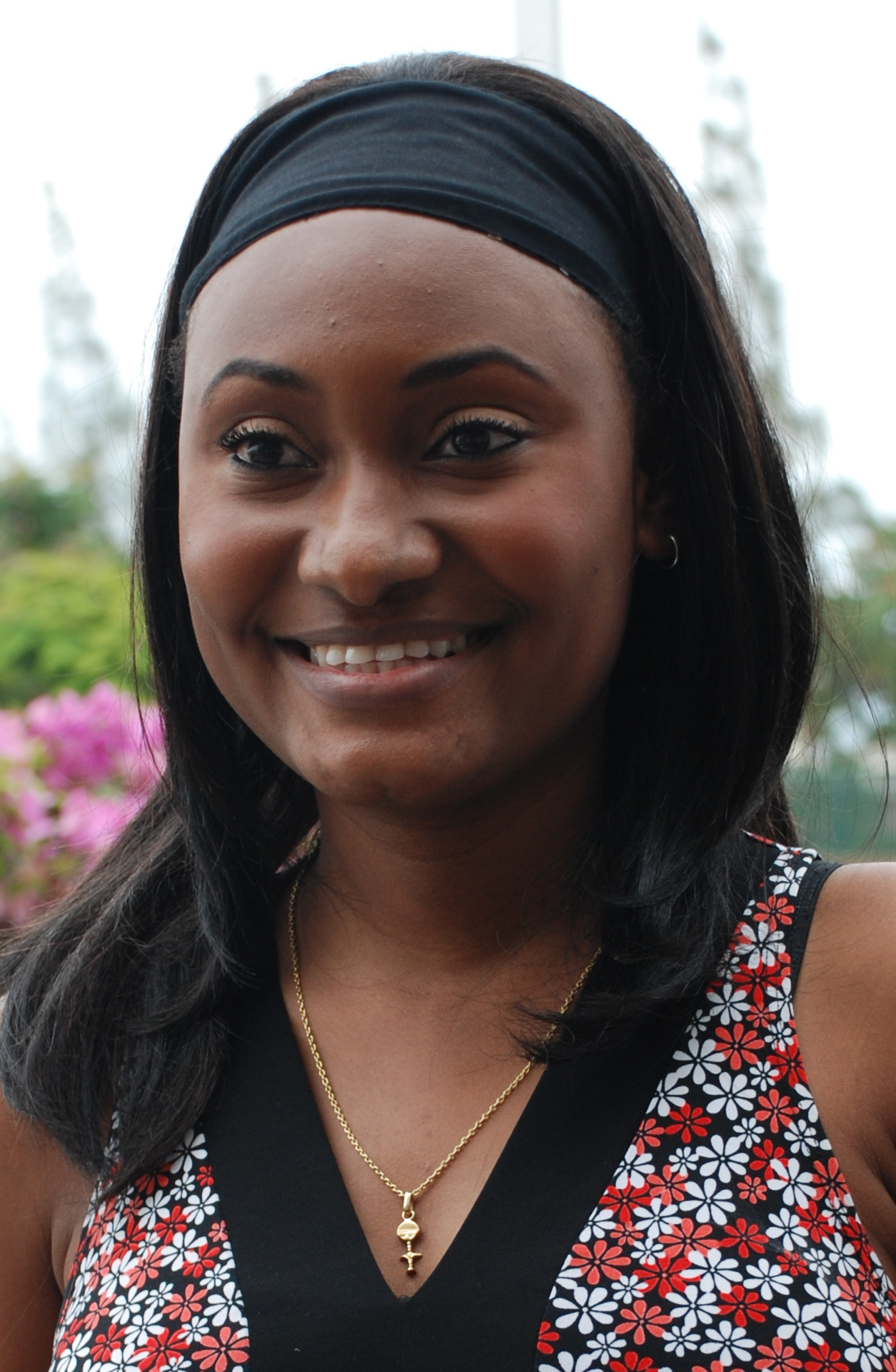
- Colas in 2009
- Born: Fabienne Colas Joseph; March 18, 1979 (age 47); Port-au-Prince, Haiti
- Occupations: Actress, director, and producer
- Years active: 2001-
- Notable work: Sortie 67 (2010), Minuit (2008), Amour mensonges et conséquences (2006)

Fabienne Colas Joseph, CM (born March 18, 1979), is a Haitian-Canadian actress, director and producer. She is head of the Fabienne Colas Foundation, which is dedicated to the promotion of film, art and culture as it organizes many festivals. Fabienne is also a recipient for the 2018 Canada's 40 under 40 award. She was appointed a Member of the Order of Canada in December 2024. She lives in Carignan, Quebec.

== Biography ==
Fabienne Colas was born in Port-au-Prince, Haiti. At a very young age, discovered her aptitude for theater, dance and a great sense of leadership. Standing at 5'8" tall, with a slender figure and waist, she became also a model at the age of 16 years. She started modeling with Academy Perfection, one of the largest schools of fashion modeling in Haiti, led by Magalie Racine.

Colas is an activist for cultural diversity upon her arrival in Canada, and she is the guest of many panel discussions, lectures, debates, interviews and consultations on issues of representation of diversity in the Quebec media and the labor force. She is among the businesswomen in Quebec and runs her own production company, Production Zaza. Colas, former model and Miss Haiti 2000 is fluent in Haitian Creole, French, English and Spanish and represented Haiti in several beauty contests abroad.

In 2003, she won the Golden Ticket Award for Best Actress for the film Barikad in Haiti (directed by Richard Senecal) and was nominated for the same film Haitian Entertainment Awards in Florida. She plays in several Quebec productions both big on the small screen (Watatatow, Auberge Black Dog, How to Conquer America in One Night, Trauma, Providence).

Colas, a member of the Union des artistes (UDA), the Alliance of Canadian Television and Radio Artists (ACTRA) and the ACCT, she participated in several prestigious juries Quebec artistic community, including the Canada Council and the Letters of Quebec. She created the Montreal International Black Film Festival, and later launched the Toronto Black Film Festival and the Halifax Black Film Festival.

In 2008, she signed her first film, Midnight, long fiction film about voodoo in which she plays a lead role. She is also the winner of Month Black History in 2010 in the category "cultural events".

Fabienne Colas holds two licenses since 2011, the Canadian Radio-television and the Telecommunications Commission (CRTC); for the creation of two television channels in French, Diversity TV 1 and TV Good Taste. It intends to offer more colors in television programs including Quebec.

== Festivals ==
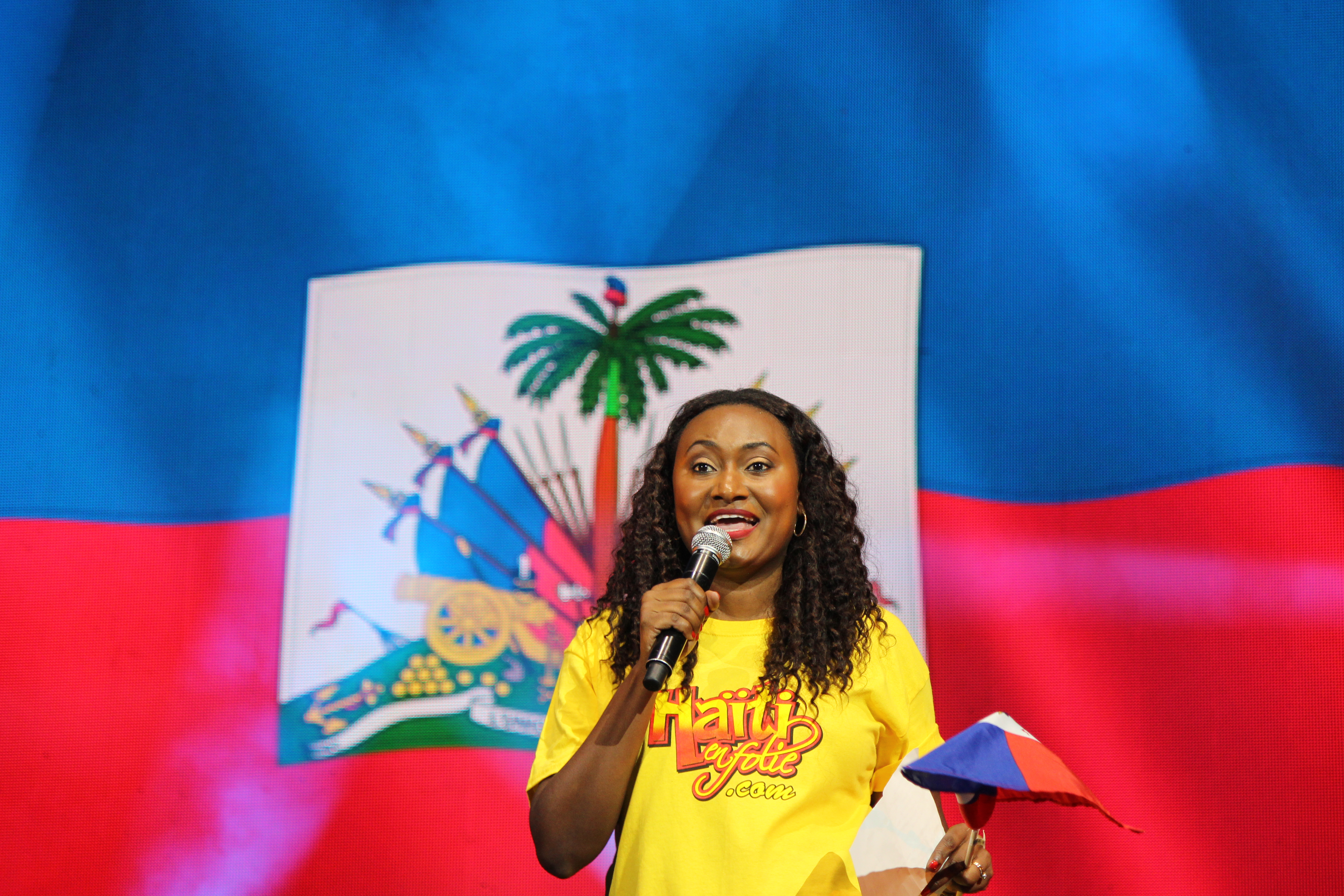
Fabienne Colas at the 2019 Haiti En Folie Festival in Montréal

- 2005 - International Black Film Festival of Montreal 2, which showcases films on the realities of Blacks from around the world
- 2007 - Haiti en Folie Festival in Montreal 3, multidisciplinary event dedicated to Haitian culture outside of Haiti.
- 2009 - Quebec Film Festival in Haiti, which aims to strengthen cultural relations between Quebec and Haiti.
- 2009 - Festival Dansomania - Dances of the World in 2009, which showcases dances from various cultural communities.
- 2009 - 2009 Festival Ririri intended to highlight over black comedians.
- 2012 - Fade to Black Event 4, which celebrates Month Black History.

== Filmography ==
=== Cinema ===
- Bouki nan Paradi - 2001
- Barikad - 2002
- Protège-moi - 2003
- Jack Paradise: Montreal by Night (Jack Paradise, les nuits de Montréal) - 2004
- How to Conquer America in One Night (Comment conquérir l'Amérique en une nuit) - 2004
- Convoitises - 2005
- Profonds regrets - 2005
- Amour mensonges et conséquences - 2006
- Minuit - 2008
- Exit 67 (Sortie 67) - 2010

== Television ==
- Providence (2011)
- Trauma I and Trauma II (2009 and 2010)
- Watatatow (2004-2005)
- Adéla (2004)
- L'Auberge du chien noir (2003)
- Pè Toma (2000 - 2001)
- Virginie (2002)
- Sorry (2004)
- Besoin de ça (2003)
