= Toronto Black Film Festival =

Annual Canadian film festival

The Toronto Black Film Festival is an annual film festival in Toronto, Ontario. Held in February each year as part of Black History Month, the festival programs a selection of African, Caribbean, African American and Black Canadian films.

The festival was launched in 2013 as an outgrowth of the Montreal International Black Film Festival, which was created by actress and filmmaker Fabienne Colas, and is sponsored by the Global Television Network and TD Canada Trust. The inaugural festival included the films Last Flight to Abuja, Phone Swap, Turning Point, Case départ, Fair Sex (Les Manèges humains) and War Witch (Rebelle).

Films are screened at a variety of venues in the city, including the Carlton Cinema, the Isabel Bader Theatre and the Art Gallery of Ontario's Jackman Hall.

Since 2015, the festival has presented an annual career achievement award to an important figure in African diaspora film. The festival honoured Fred Williamson in 2015, Alfre Woodard in 2016, Lou Gossett Jr. in 2017, Robi Reed in 2018, Tarana Burke in 2019, Spike Lee in 2020, and Taraji P. Henson and Clement Virgo in 2021.

Due to the COVID-19 pandemic in Canada, the 2021 festival was presented online. It opened with Youssef Delara's film Foster Boy, and closed with Mia Donovan's documentary film Dope Is Death.
