= Regent Park Film Festival =

Canadian film festival

- Location: Toronto, Ontario, Canada
- Founded: 2003
- Founded by: Chandra Siddan
- Website: Official website

Created in 2003 in Toronto, Ontario, Regent Park Film Festival (RPFF) is a non-profit cultural and educational media arts organization. It is Toronto's longest-running, FREE community film festival.

RPFF is dedicated to showcasing local and international independent works relevant to people from all walks of life. The key communities it serves are Black, Indigenous and People of Colour (BIPOC) communities, people with low-income, people who live in public housing, and Regent Park residents.

RPFF programs the most aesthetically interesting, educational, thought-provoking, and entertaining films from Toronto and around the world, placing emphasis on works that represent culturally diverse experiences. RPFF showcases films of all genres, (documentary, fiction, animation, experimental) on themes which reflect the communities its serves, such as urbanization, racial justice, community activism, immigrant experiences, experiences of working class, and cultural identity.

Since its inception in 2003, it has been vital to RPFF's mission to offer programming that is free and accessible to everyone, regardless of financial or social status. Removing barriers to participation is core to its mission and why they also provide free childcare, free film submissions, and pay all artists for their work and participation.

== History ==
In 2003, Chandra Siddan, a filmmaker and student in the York University's "Regent Park Community Education Program", founded the RPFF as an alternative educational setting for an assignment with support from her instructor Jeff Kugler, principal of Nelson Mandela Park Public School, who offered his school as the venue for the event, and Professor Harry Smaller who garnered broadly-based support from the University.

For seven years, the festival screened at Nelson Mandela Park Public School before moving to Lord Dufferin Public School in 2010 and 2011. On its tenth anniversary in 2012, RPFF and its offices moved into the Daniels Spectrum cultural hub and started delivering year-round programming, such as workshops and community screenings.

In addition to its annual film festival, RPFF hosts an outdoor summer film series, called Under the Stars, present year-round community screenings, panel discussions, filmmaking workshops, paid industry internships, and an annual School Programs all at no cost to attendees or participants.

In 2007, a year after RPFF incorporated, Siddan stepped down as Festival Director and was replaced by Karin Haze until 2010, Richard Fung in 2011, Ananya Ohri from 2012 to 2018, Tendisai Cromwell from 2018 to 2019, Angela Britto from 2019 to 2022 and, as of 2022, Kalpana Srinarayanadas.

== Programming and projects ==
In addition to the film festival, RPFF provides year round programming including:

- Live it to Learn it: paid-internship program
- Under the Stars: summer movie screenings
- Workshops

=== Home Made Visible project ===
In 2017, the RPFF embarked on a three-year project titled "Home Made Visible" after receiving funding from the Canadian Council for the Arts New Chapter. The three-part nationwide project:

- digitized home movies from the Indigenous and visible minority communities and donated a selection of clips for preservation at York University Libraries,
- commissioned six artist films,
- exhibited the artworks and selected home movie clips across Canada to encourage discussions around diverse histories and futures.

This project received nationwide media coverage.

In 2019, the project received Lieutenant Governor's Ontario Heritage Award for Excellence in Conservation from the Ontario Heritage Trust.

In 2020, the project was shortlisted for the Governor General Canada's History Award for Excellence in Community Programming.

== Notable filmmakers, curators, programmers, and guests ==
- Michelle Latimer
- Lisa Wegner
- Mehreen Jabbar
- Charuvi Agrawal
- Charles Officer
- Phillip Pike
- Mati Diop
- Lulu Wang
- Tasha Hubbard
- Ali Kazimi
